= List of defunct airlines of Kazakhstan =

This is a list of defunct airlines of Kazakhstan.

Airline	Image	IATA	ICAO	Callsign	Commenced operations	Ceased operations	Notes
7th Sky		7S	BYK	SUMKO	2013	2015	
Aeroservice Kazakhstan			AVZ		1991	2000	
Aerotur-KZ Airlines			RAI	DIASA	2006	2009	AOC revoked due to poor maintenance standards
Air Almaty			LMY		2005		
Air Kazakhstan		9Y	KZK	AIR KAZAKHSTAN	1996	2004	Went bankrupt
Air Kokshetau		0K	KRT	KOKTA	2002	2008	
Almaty Aviation		6T	LMT	ALMATY	2002	2010	
Aral Airlines			JAK		1991	2002	
Asia Continental Airlines			CID	ACID	2002	2010	AOC revoked
Asia Service Airlines					1994	1999	
Asia Wings		Y5	AWA		2010	2012	
Atyrau Airways		IP	JOL	EDIL	1996	2009	AOC revoked due to poor maintenance standards
Azamat Airlines							
Beibars							
Bek Air		Z9	BEK	BEKAIR	2011	2020	AOC revoked due to safety violations
Berkut Air			BEC		1999	2011	Rebranded as Bek Air
Berkut West							
BGB Air							
Burundaiavia			BRY	BURAIR	1946	2010	
Caspiy			TLG		2011	2014	
DETA Air		9D	DET	SAMAL	2006	2013	
Don Avia							
Eastern Express							
Euro-Asia International							
Excellent Glide			EGB		2007		
GST Aero							
International Jet Tour							
InvestAvia			TLG		2007		
Irbis							
Kazair West			KAW	KAZWEST	1996	2010	AOC revoked due to poor maintenance standards
Kazakhstan Airlines		K4	KZA; SAX	KAZAKH	1991	1996	Went bankrupt
Luk Aero							
MAK Air							
Mega Aircompany			MGK		2005	2013	
Miras Air							
Orient Eagle Airways		4R	OEG		1998	2002	
Samal Air							
SAN Air Company							
SAPSAN					2009	2013	
SAT Airlines							
Sayakhat Airlines			SAH	SAYAKHAT	1991	2012	
SBS Aircraft		XE	ALT	GREEN CRAFT		2001	
Semeyavia		E8	SMK		1991	2013	
SkyBus International Airlines		7S	BYK	SUMKO	2008	2017	
Skyjet							
Starline.kz		DZ	LMZ	ALUNK	2007	2009	AOC revoked due to poor maintenance standards
Tahmid Air			THM	THAMID	2008	2009	AOC revoked due to poor maintenance standards
Taraz Wings Aircompany							
Trans-Asia			TSX		1996	1999	
Trans Aviation Global Group							
Tulpar Air Service			TUX	TULPA	1998	2009	AOC revoked due to poor maintenance standards
Yuzhnaya Kazakhstan Airlines							

== See also ==
- List of airlines of Kazakhstan
- List of airports in Kazakhstan
