= List of airlines of Kazakhstan =

This is a list of aircraft operators which are currently licensed by the Kazakh civil aviation authorities.

== Scheduled airlines ==
Airline	Airline (in Kazakh)	Image	Founded	IATA	ICAO	Callsign
Air Astana	«Эйр Астана» әуекомпаниясы		2001	KC	KZR	ASTANALINE
FlyArystan	FlyArystan әуекомпаниясы		2018	FS	AYN	ARYSTAN
Qazaq Air	QAZAQ AIR әуекомпаниясы		2015	IQ	QAZ	SAMRUK
SCAT	«СКАТ» әуекомпаниясы		1997	DV	VSV	VLASTA

== Charter airlines ==
Airline	Image	Founded	IATA	ICAO	Callsign
Aerotrans		2000		ATG	
Avia Jaynar		2001	JN	SAP	TOBOL
Comlux KZ		2009		KAZ	KAZLUX
East Wing		2006		EWZ	
Euro-Asia Air		1997	5B	EAK	EAKAZ
Fly Jet KZ		2008		FJK	
Jet Airlines		2008		SOZ	
Kaz Air Jet		2008		KEJ	
Kazakhmys		2007			
Kazaviaspas		2003		KZS	SPAKAZ
Khozu Avia		2002		OZU	
Prime Aviation		2005		PKZ	
Sayat Air		2007		SYM	
Sky Service (Kazakhstan)		2004		KVR	KAVAIR
Sunday Airlines		2013	DV	VSV	VLASTA
Zhetysu		1994		JTU	KAVAIR
Sigma Airlines		2017		SGL	SIGAIR

== Cargo airlines ==
Airline	Image	Founded	IATA	ICAO	Callsign
Jupiter Jet		2016	IM	JPJ	JupiterJet

== See also ==
- List of airlines
- List of defunct airlines of Kazakhstan
- List of defunct airlines of Asia
- List of airports in Kazakhstan
