= Flight 1907 =

Flight 1907 may refer to:

Listed chronologically

- Kazakhstan Airlines Flight 1907, involved in a mid-air collision on 12 November 1996
- Gol Transportes Aéreos Flight 1907, involved in a mid-air collision on 29 September 2006
