= 2024 Darfur Ilyushin Il-76 shootdown =

Event in Darfur during the Sudanese civil war

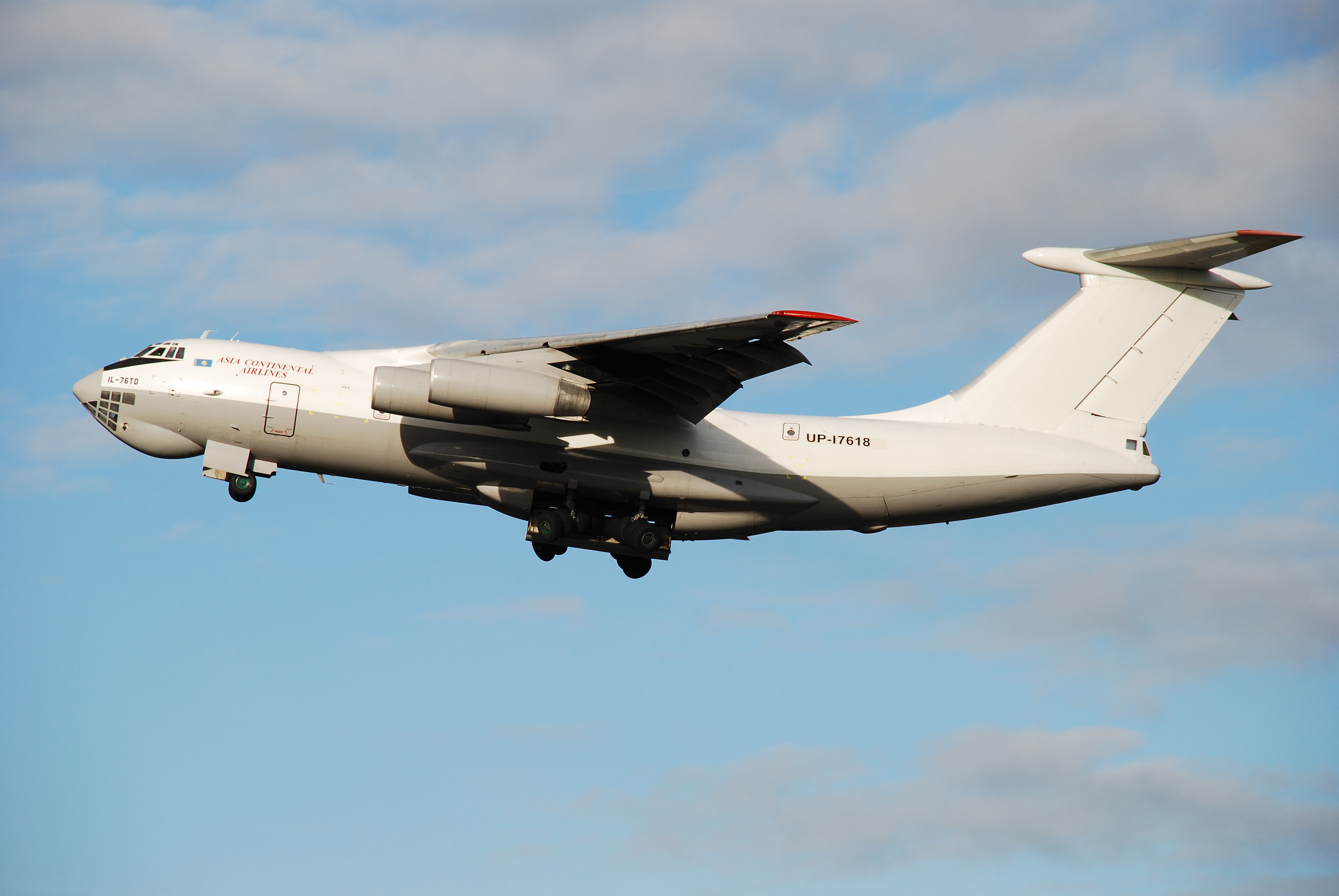
- ST-JAN, the Ilyushin Il-76T involved in the accident, pictured under a previous registration, while still in service with Asia Continental Airlines

Shootdown
- Date: 21 October 2024
- Summary: Shootdown
- Site: Al Mahla, Darfur, Sudan

Aircraft
- Aircraft type: Ilyushin Il-76T
- Operator: Sudanese Armed Forces
- Registration: ST-JAN
- Flight origin: Port Sudan New International Airport, Port Sudan, Sudan
- Destination: El Fasher Airport, Al Fashir, Sudan
- Occupants: 5
- Crew: 5
- Fatalities: 5
- Survivors: 0

On 21 October 2024, a cargo Ilyushin Il-76 was shot down over the Darfur region of western Sudan by the Rapid Support Forces (RSF) during the Sudanese civil war. All five people aboard were killed. The aircraft was operated by the Sudanese Armed Forces (SAF) on a mission to deliver equipment and medicine to the army-held city of Al-Fashir.

The aircraft involved was an Ilyushin Il-76 registered previously as EX-76011 with serial number 0013428831 operated by New Way Cargo Airlines registered in Kyrgyzstan. The aircraft was exported to Sudan on 12 January 2024 where it was re-registered ST-JAN; the initial report that it was EX-76011 was on account of a safety card bearing this registration being found in the wreckage. The plane was operating since December 2023 from Port Sudan. It previously have supplied the RSF but at the time of its shootdown was supplying the SAF.

== Background ==
=== Political situation ===
The territorial situation in Sudan in 2024

Since 15 April 2023, a civil war broke out in Sudan between the Sudanese Armed Forces (SAF) and the paramilitary Rapid Support Forces (RSF). At the time of the accident, the RSF controlled most of Darfur and Gezira State, along with parts of central Sudan, and an area near the border with Libya.

=== Aircraft and crew ===
The aircraft involved was an Ilyushin Il-76 registered as ST-JAN with serial number 0013428831. It was manufactured in 1981 and was previously operated by New Way Cargo Airlines. There were five crew members on board, two Russians and three Sudanese, according to RT, the pilot was Anton Selivanets. On the crash site were also found document belonging to Viktor Granov, a Russian pilot who owned the airlines Aircargo Services International and Grand Propeller. Although documents from Manas International Airport in Kyrgyzstan were found on the accident site, it appears that no employees of the airport were on the aircraft. A spokesperson for New Way Cargo, which is also based in Kyrgyzstan, said that its lease on the aircraft had expired at the end of 2023.

The aircraft was re-registered in Sudan in January 2024 as ST-JAN. Since December 2023, flight data has shown that it has flown to Port Sudan.

== Incident ==
The aircraft was reportedly hit by missiles fired by the RSF while it was flying over Darfur. Videos of the crash show the plane on fire diving towards the ground before crashing. The RSF claimed to have recovered the plane's black boxes and some documents it was carrying. A safety pamphlet and a Russian passport were found on the crash site. The RSF troops in Darfur might have been unaware of the flights that were flying over the region at the time, instead expecting attacks from the Sudanese Air Force.

== Aftermath ==
Initially, RSF Commander Ali Rizqallah claimed that they had just shot down an Antonov of the Egyptian Air Force that was carrying weapons or bombing Darfur.

An investigation by Reuters showed that flight tracking suggested that the transport plane that was shot down once supplied the RSF and had recently switched to serving the SAF. The RSF shared footage of its troops with the burning wreckage of the plane in Al Malha, north of Al Fashir. The RSF also shared pictures showing the identity documents of two Russians who they said were on board as well as three Sudanese Armed Forces personnel. A Reuters analysis of the documents indicated that one of the Russian crew was previously involved in arms trafficking. Russia's embassy in Sudan has stated that it was investigating the incident.

Among the photos of documents circulating online after the crash was a set of safety instructions showing the registration number EX-76011. EX-76011 was the registration of an IL-76 aircraft formerly operated by New Way Cargo, an airline based in Kyrgyzstan, which was reported to have supplied the RSF through Chad with support from the United Arab Emirates, according to a report by the Sudan Conflict Observatory. The UAE has denied reports of supporting the RSF. Kyrgyzstan's civil aviation agency stated that the plane was removed from its registry and transferred to Sudan on 12 January 2024.

Reuters analysis of flight tracking data and satellite imagery shows that EX-76011 flew routes toward Chad until November 2023. Data from December 2023 however indicate that the aircraft traveled to Port Sudan which is the headquarters of the Sudanese Armed Forces, indicating that the plane was supplying the SAF at the time of its shootdown.

== See also ==
- 2007 Mogadishu TransAVIAexport Airlines Il-76 crash - Another commercial cargo Il-76 shot down during a conflict in Africa.
- 2020 African Express Airways Brasilia crash - Another cargo plane shot down.
- List of airliner shootdown incidents
