= Kazakhstan Airlines =

First flag carrier of Kazakhstan

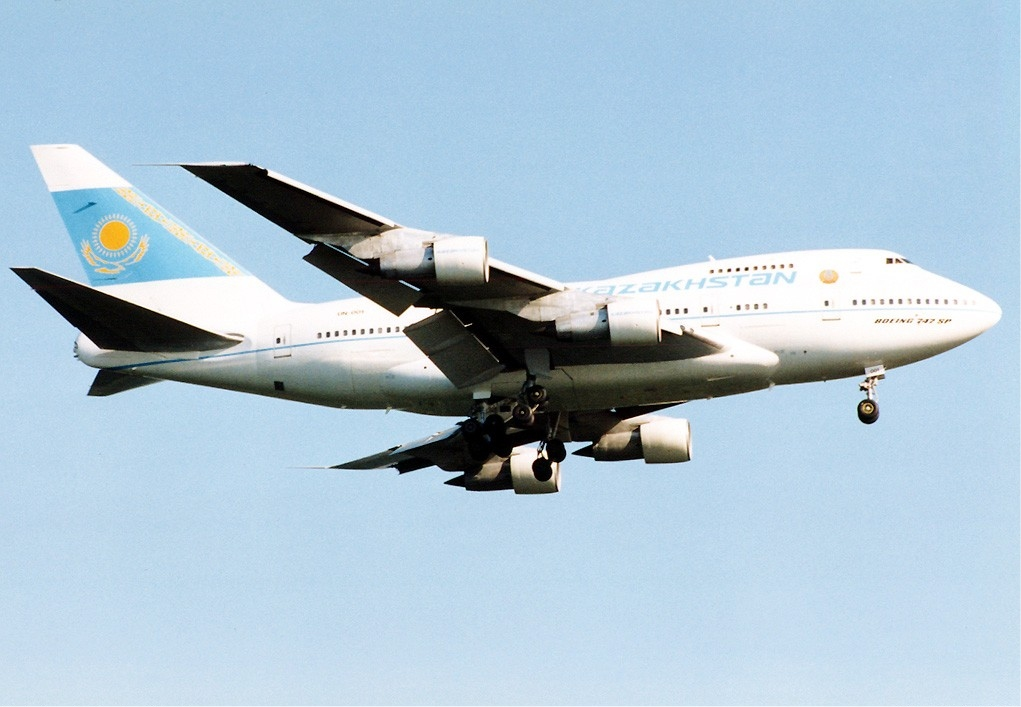
- A Boeing 747SP of Kazakhstan Airlines approaching Frankfurt Airport (1994).
IATA	ICAO	Call sign
KZ	KZA	KAZAKH
- Founded: 1991
- Commenced operations: 1992
- Ceased operations: 1996
- Hubs: Almaty International Airport
- Destinations: 80
- Headquarters: Almaty, Kazakhstan

Kazakhstan Airlines was an airline from Kazakhstan, serving as the first national flag carrier of the country from its independence in 1991 until 1996. Following the disaster of the Charkhi Dadri mid-air collision, Kazakhstan Airlines ceased operations, and its role as flag carrier was transferred to Air Kazakhstan.

== History ==
Following the Dissolution of the Soviet Union in 1991, the Kazakh division of the state-owned airline, Aeroflot, was transformed into Kazakhstan Airlines, with scheduled flights from its hub at Almaty International Airport being launched in 1992. In 1996, 4 years after Kazakhstan Airlines was started, their sales plummeted following the Charkhi Dadri mid-air collision.

== Fleet ==
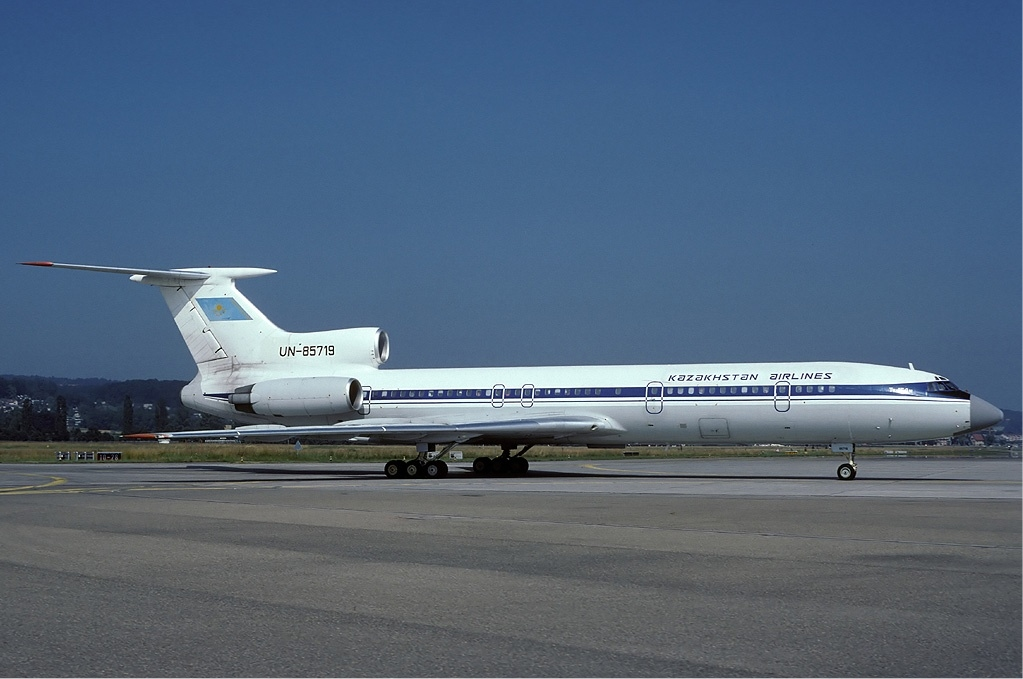
A Kazakhstan Airlines Tupolev Tu-154 at Zurich Airport (1994).

Kazakhstan Airlines inherited a fleet of the following aircraft types:

- Antonov An-24
- Antonov An-26
- Antonov An-30
- Boeing 747SP
- Boeing 757-200
- Ilyushin Il-18
- Ilyushin Il-76
- Ilyushin Il-86
- Tupolev Tu-134
- Tupolev Tu-154
- Yakovlev Yak-40
- Yakovlev Yak-42

== Accidents and incidents ==
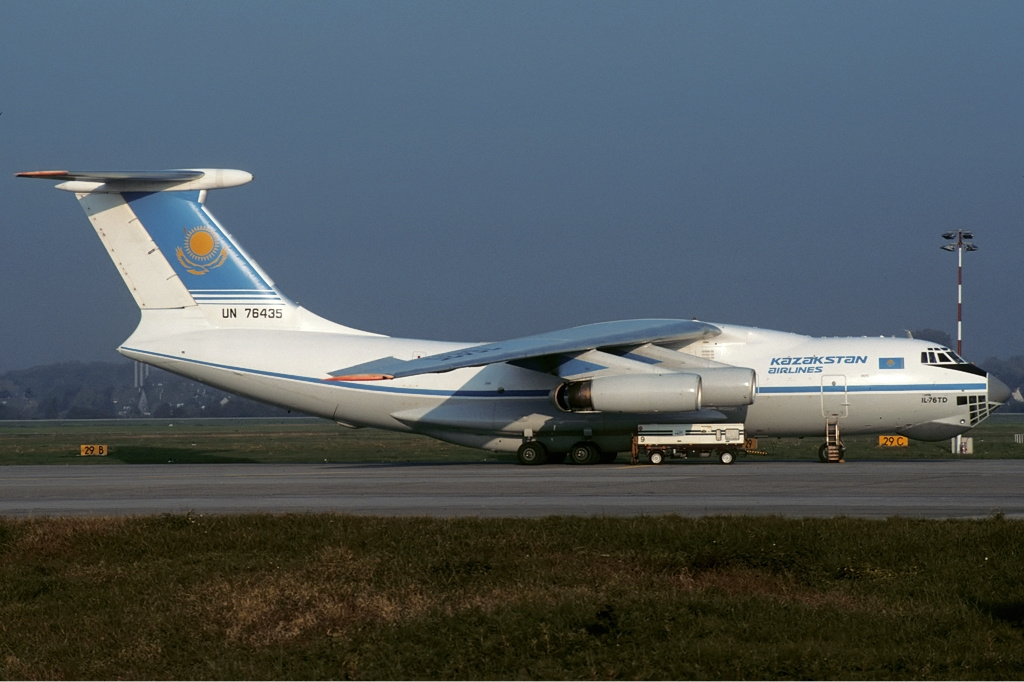
A Kazakhstan Airlines Ilyushin Il-76 in 1994. This aircraft was later destroyed in the Charkhi Dadri mid-air collision.

Kazakhstan Airlines was involved in the Charkhi Dadri mid-air collision, which occurred on 12 November 1996 and—with its 349 fatalities—marks one of the deadliest air disasters in history. A Kazakhstan Airlines Ilyushin Il-76, operating as Flight 1907, collided with a Boeing 747-100B of Saudi Arabian Airlines. Investigation into the accident revealed that the pilots of Flight 1907 had descended from their assigned altitude, which was attributed to poor training and non-sufficient English language skills. As a consequence, the government of Kazakhstan declared that Kazakhstan Airlines was bankrupt, transferring its assets to newly founded Air Kazakhstan.

There were another four accidents, none of which resulted in any reported fatalities, though one resulted in an aircraft of Kazakhstan Airlines being written-off:

- On 16 January 1993, an Antonov An-24 (registered UN-46478) with nineteen passengers and four crew crash-landed at Kostanay Airport. During approach of the airport, the left wing engine failed. The pilots did not manage to properly align the aircraft with the runway and failed to execute a go-around, resulting in the aircraft hitting the ground 162 meters short of the runway threshold.
- On 21 January 1995, a Tupolev Tu-154 (registered UN-85455) overshot the runway during a take-off attempt at Karachi International Airport. There were 105 passengers and five crew members on board, and the aircraft had an overload of six tons.
- A few months later, on 13 April 1995, a Yakovlev Yak-40 (registered UN-88181) veered off the runway at Taraz Airport during a crosswind landing. The aircraft with 28 passengers and 3 crew on board struck a concrete barrier.
- Still in 1995, on 1 November, an Antonov An-24 (registered UN-47710) crash landed on a field 1100 meters short of the runway threshold of Shymkent Airport in a failed landing attempt. The aircraft had been on a training flight with four crew on board.

== See also ==
- List of defunct airlines of Kazakhstan
