= AN50 =

AN50, AN-50, AN.50, AN 50, may refer to:

- Toyota AN50, a model of Toyota Fortuner SUV
- Antonov An-50, a cancelled Soviet jetliner
- USS Cinnamon (AN-50), a WWII U.S. Navy net-laying ship
