= Antonov An-24 =

Soviet turboprop airplane

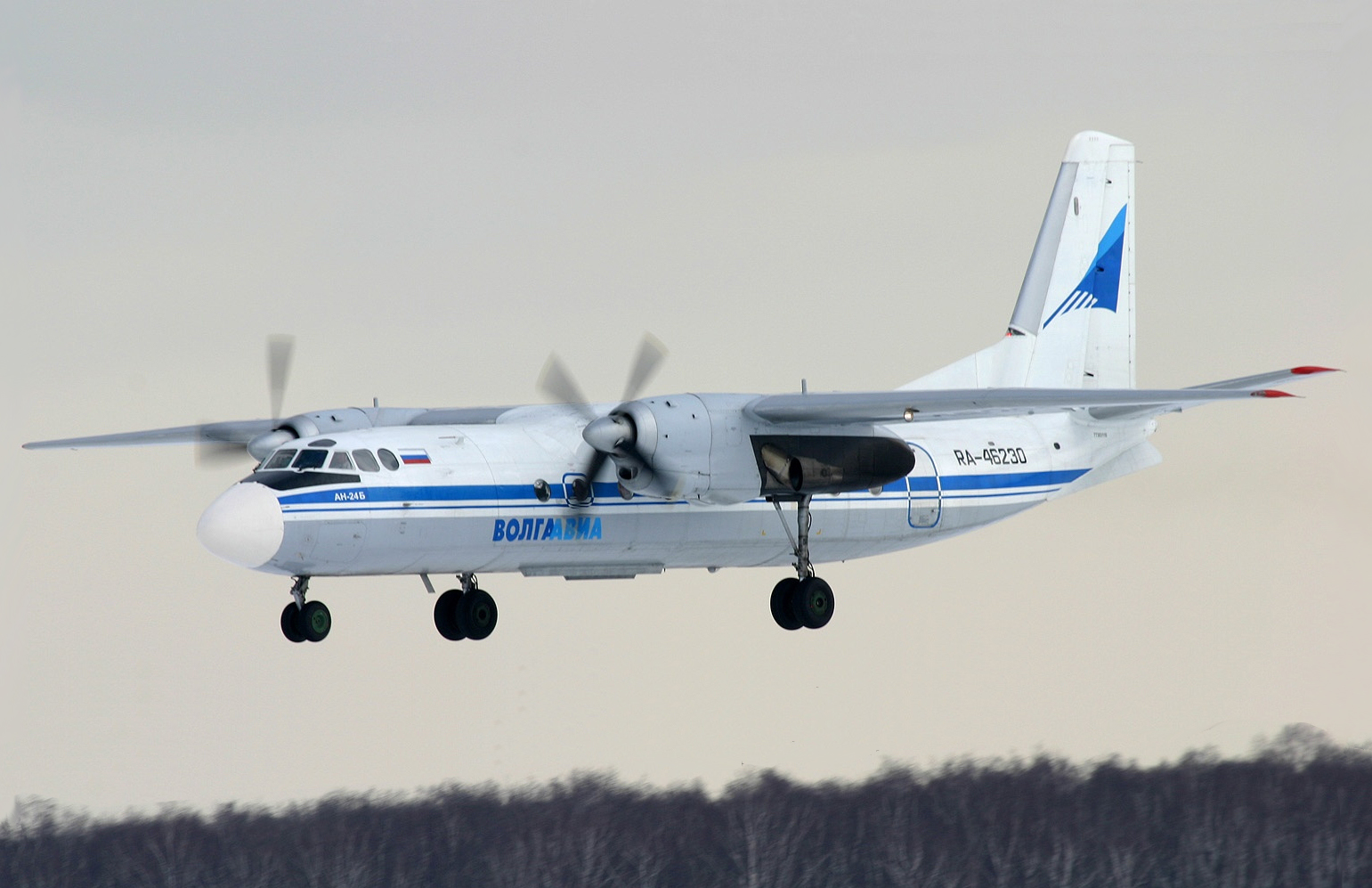
- Volga-Avia Antonov An-24

General information
- Type: Regional airliner / military transport
- National origin: Soviet Union
- Manufacturer: Antonov Serial Production Plant; Irkutsk Aviation Plant; Ulan-Ude Aviation Plant
- Designer: Antonov
- Status: In service
- Primary users: Aeroflot (former): IrAero; Utair; Polar Airlines
- Number built: >1,367

History
- Manufactured: 1959–1976
- Introduction date: 1962
- First flight: 29 October 1959
- Developed into: Antonov An-30; Antonov An-26; Antonov An-32; Xi'an Y-7; Antonov/Taqnia An-132

The Antonov An-24 (Russian/Ukrainian: Антонов Ан-24; NATO reporting name: Coke) is a 50-seat twin turboprop regional airliner designed in 1957 in the Soviet Union by the Antonov Design Bureau. Later variants saw other uses, such as military transport and aerial cartography. The aircraft was manufactured by the Kyiv, Irkutsk and Ulan-Ude Aviation Factories. It was license-produced in China as the early versions of the Xi'an Y-7.

The An-24 was the first of a future family of turboprops by Antonov. The first variant was the An-30, which came equipped with a cartographic configuration. It was then followed by the An-26, which was a more militarized version of the airliner. The final variant was the An-32, which was given more modernized equipment and powerful engines. The An-132 was the result of a joint venture between Antonov and Saudi Arabia's Taqnia to develop a modernized version of the An-24 family, but Taqnia left the project and the only prototype was destroyed, which led to the project being cancelled.

== Design and development ==
First flown in 1959, the An-24 is powered by two Ivchenko AI-24 turboprop engines, and was produced in some 1,000 units of various versions; in 2023, 93 were still in service worldwide, mostly in the Commonwealth of Independent States and Africa.

It was designed to replace the veteran piston Ilyushin Il-14 transport on short- to medium-haul trips, optimised for operating from rough strips and unprepared airports in remote locations. The high-wing layout protects engines and blades from debris, the power-to-weight ratio is higher than that of many comparable aircraft, and the machine is rugged, requiring minimal ground-support equipment.

Due to its rugged airframe and good performance, the An-24 was adapted to perform many secondary missions, such as ice reconnaissance and engine/propeller test bed, as well as further development to produce the An-26 tactical transport, An-30 photo-mapping/survey aircraft and An-32 tactical transport with more powerful engines. Various projects were envisaged such as a four-jet, short- and medium-haul airliner and various iterations of powerplant.

The main production line was at the Kyiv-Svyatoshino (later renamed "Aviant") aircraft production plant, which built 985, with 180 built at Ulan Ude, and a further 197 An-24T tactical transport/freighters at Irkutsk. Production in the USSR was shut down by 1978.

Production continued at China's Xi'an Aircraft Industrial Corporation, which made licensed, reverse-engineered, and redesigned aircraft as the Xian Y-7 and its derivatives. Manufacture of the Y-7, in civil form, has now been supplanted by the MA60 derivative with western engines and avionics, to improve performance and economy, and widen the export appeal.

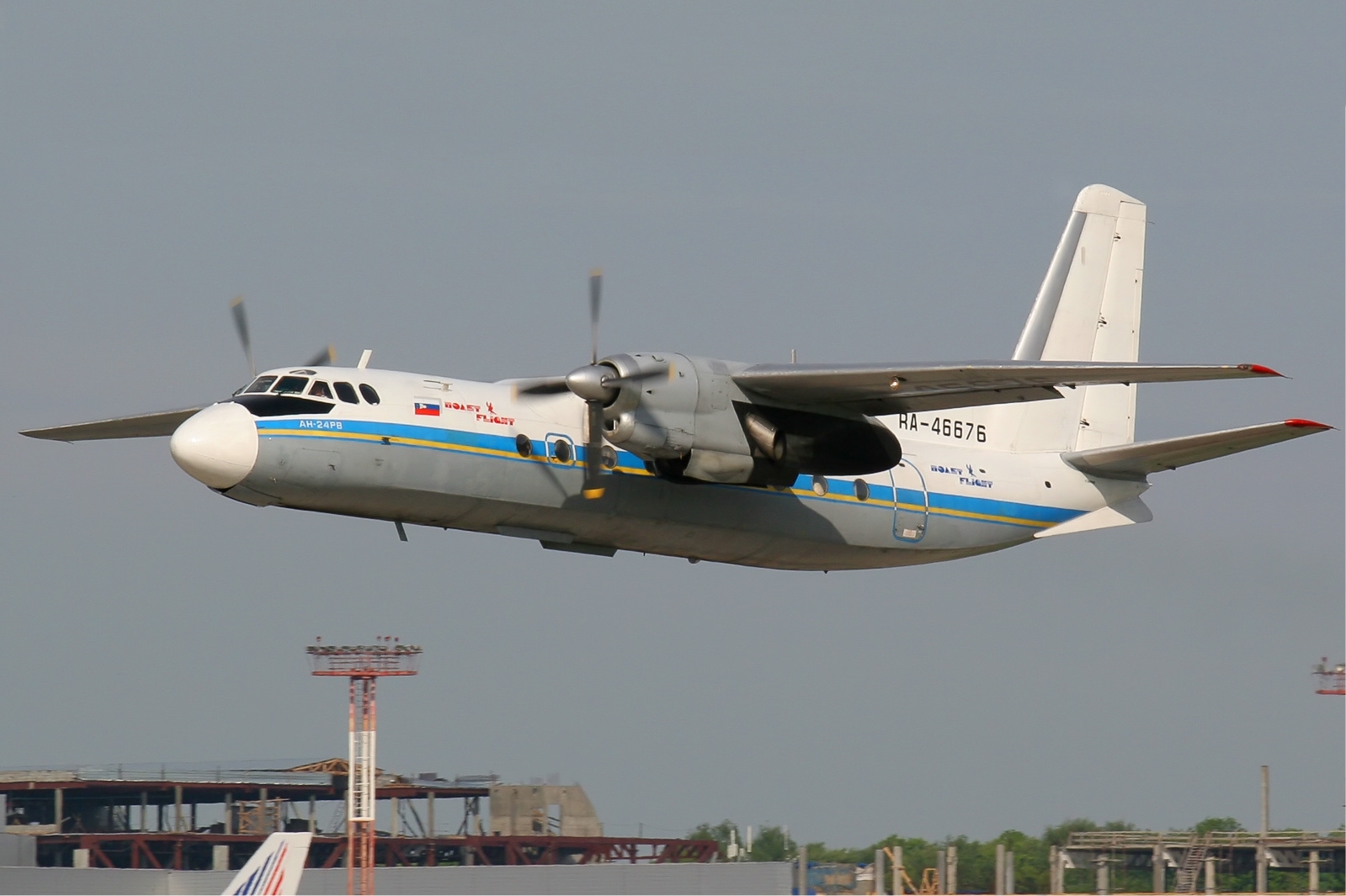
Polet Flight An-24RV

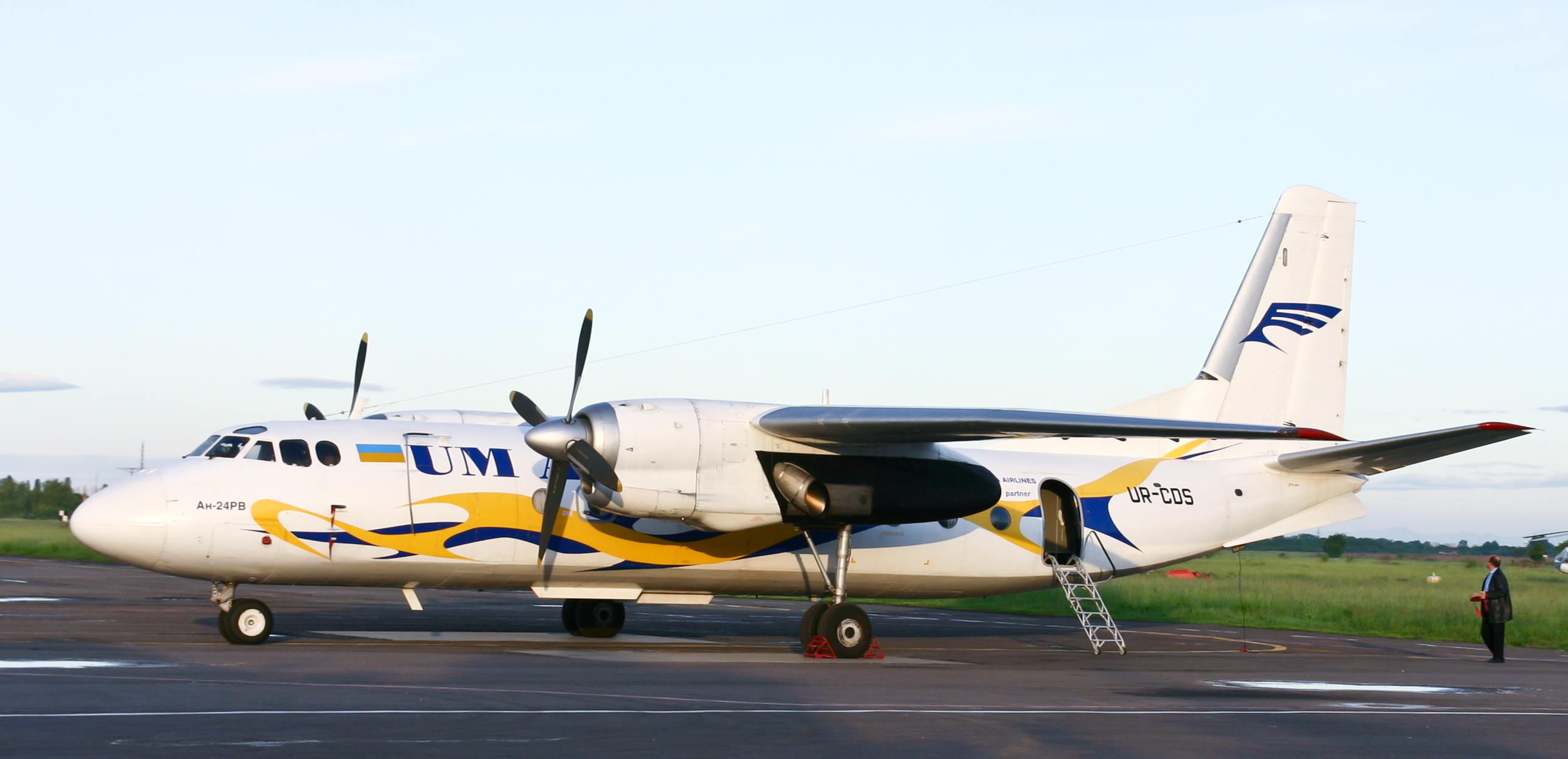
An-24 at Uzhhorod, Ukraine, on 21 May 2005

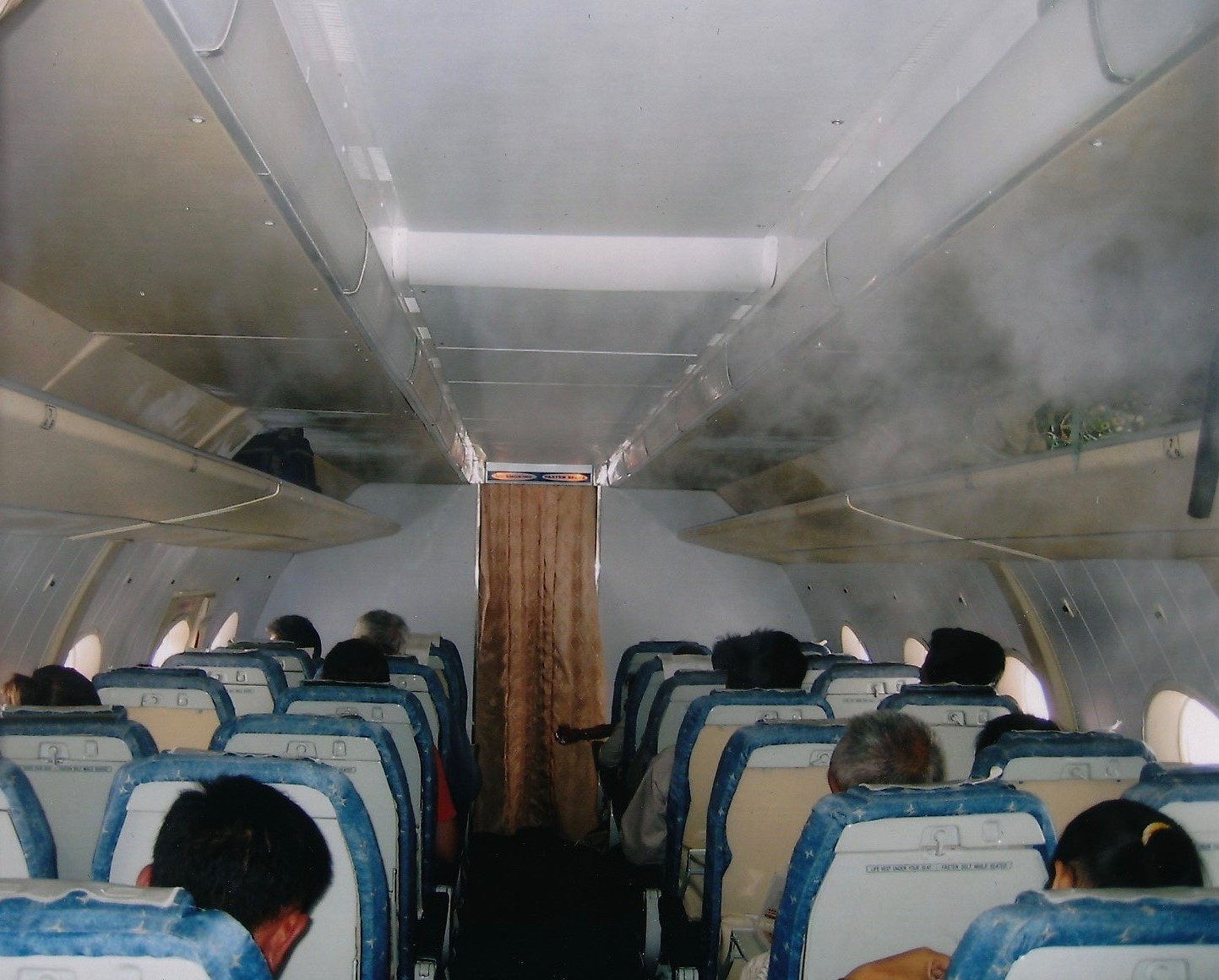
Interior of a Kampuchea Airlines Antonov An-24 from 1994

=== Total production ===
Total production (not including Chinese Y-7)	1979	1978	1977	1976	1975	1974	1973	1972	1971	1970	1969	1968	1967	1966	1965	1964	1963	1962	1961	1960	1959
1367	1	2	10	20	40	80	71	80	90	130	100	150	160	110	60	40	191	26	1	4	1

== Variants ==
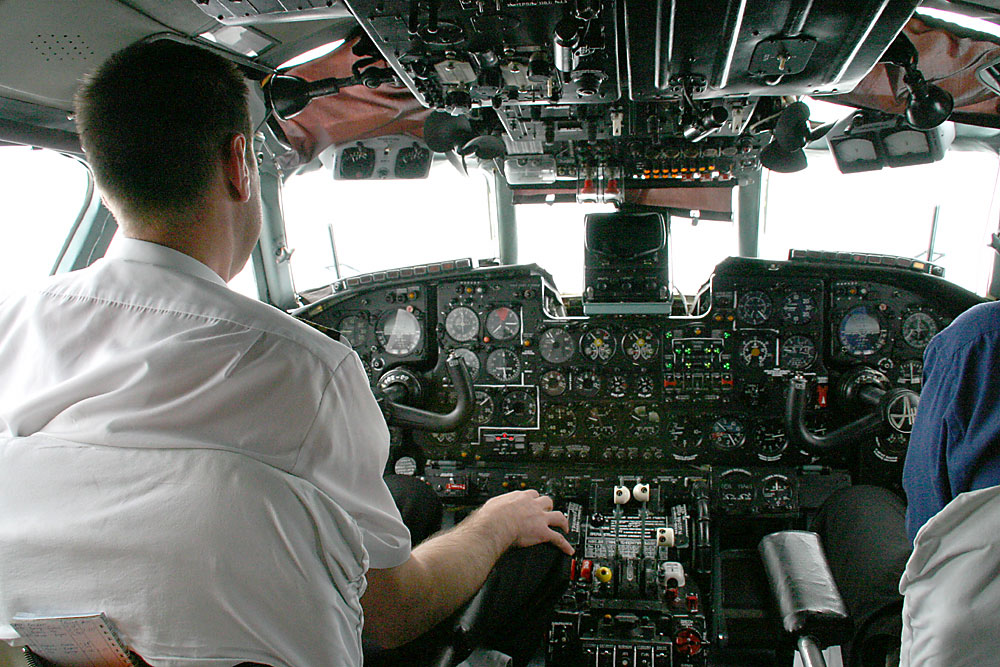
View of the cockpit

=== Prototype ===
An-24
These were the first production aircraft, with a total of six built between 1959 and 1961. They were primarily used for testing the aircraft's instruments and landing gear, and also for ground tests and de-icing tests.

=== Produced aircraft ===
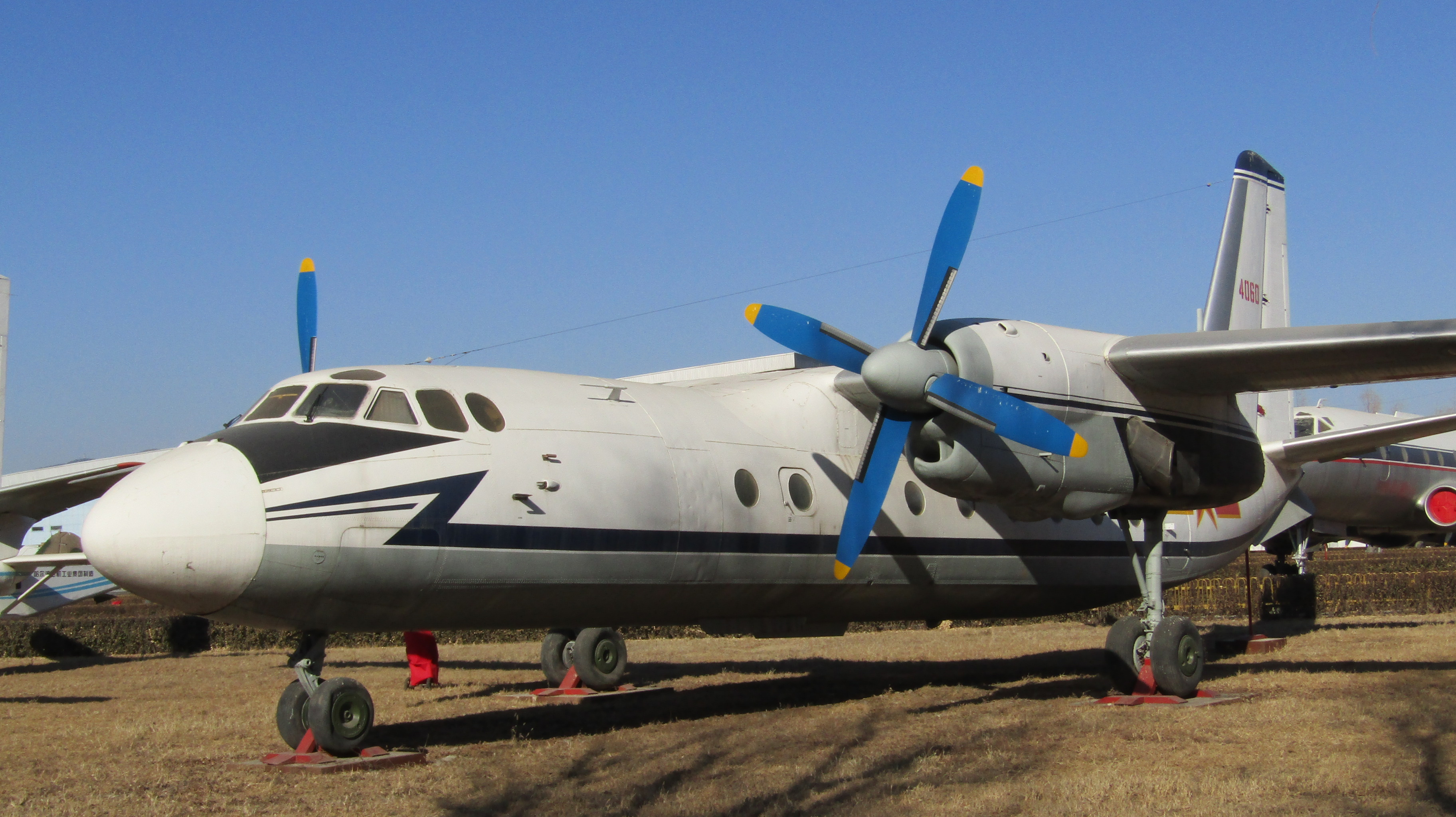
An-24RV of PLAAF at China Aviation Museum, Beijing

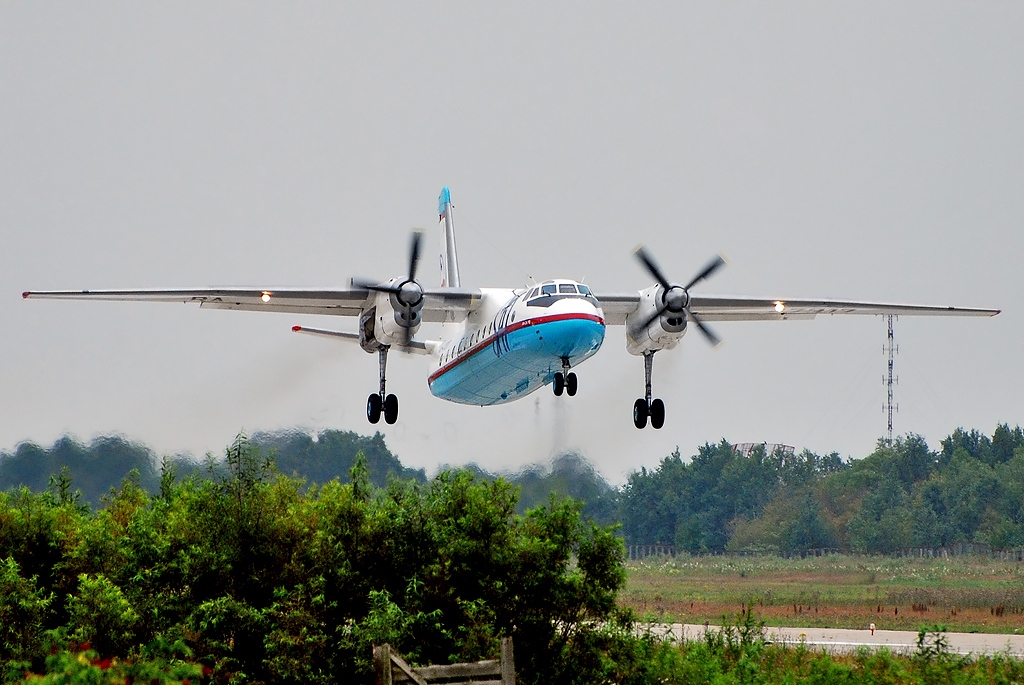
SAT Airlines' Antonov An-24RV

An-24
Seventeen were built. This was the first production model, separate from the prototypes built between 1959 and 1961. It was approved for production on 19 August 1961, and test engineering flights with passengers took place in September 1962. It entered service between Kiev and Kherson on 31 October 1962. Later, it was decided to replace them with improved models, and all of them were exported to Cuba and used as military transports by the Cuban Air Force. After being used as transports to replace the An-2, two were released to civilian airlines.
An-24A
200 were built (9 in 1962, 191 in 1963) of this improved version, delivered directly from the Kiev factory. It seated 44 passengers and had a larger interior volume. In addition, the APU exhaust was moved to the tip of the starboard nacelle. This was the second time the designation was used.
An-24B
400 aircraft were built in the second production version. A passenger version with seating for up to 52. Maximum takeoff weight was increased to 21 tonnes, a window was added on each side, the double slotted flaps were replaced with single slotted flaps, and the centre chord was extended to compensate for the poor performance of the flaps. Some aircraft were delivered with four additional fuel bladders in the centre wing. Production began in 1964.
An-24T (Transportnyy – transport)
This is the second time this name has been used for a tactical transport aircraft. It is equipped with a ventral loading hatch, a cargo winch, and an escape hatch behind the nose landing gear, and its mission is to transport airborne troops and infantry to frontline bases.
An-24RT (Reaktivnyy [Uskoritel'] Transportnyy – boosted transport)
Similar to the AN-24T, fitted with an auxiliary turbojet engine.
An-24PRT (Poiskovo-spasahtel'nyy Reaktivnyy [Uskoritel'] Transportnyy – SAR boosted transport)
The An-24RT was the basis for the search and rescue aircraft, of which 11 were manufactured, and was fitted with rescue equipment and exploration devices in the cabin. Both were considered important due to their ability to stay in the air.
An-24RV (Reaktivnyy [Uskoritel'] V – boosted V)
Turbojet boosted export version, similar to the An-24V but fitted with a 1,985-lb (8830 N) thrust auxiliary turbojet engine in the starboard nacelle.
An-24ShT (Shtabnoy Transportnyy – Staff/HQ transport)
A tactical Airborne Command Post for use by commanders, also capable of forming ground-based communications and HQ.
An-24TV (Transportnyy V – transport V)
The export cargo version of the An-24T.
An-24V
An export version of the An-24B, equipped with an AI-24T (SrsII) turboprop engine, available in early and late models. The early model has narrow in-chord wings, double slotted flaps, and a single ventral fin. The later model has a single slotted flap, twin ventral fins, and a modified interior to allow cargo to be carried in addition to passengers. Production began in 1964.
An-24VSR
A navigation trainer aircraft that was operated in 1965 by modifying a single An-24V aircraft and was intended to train pilots in radio communication.

=== Special mission aircraft ===
An-24ALK (Avtomatizeerovannaya [sistema] Lyotnovo Kontrolya – automatic flight check system)
A single retired passenger An-24A was converted into a satellite observation aircraft for use in navigation satellite calibration missions. It was renamed An-24LR "Toros" for air defense surveillance, but was later modified again and redesignated An-24ALK. The aircraft was equipped with a phototheodolite and a powerful light source for optical sensors.
An-24LL (Letyushchaya Laboratoriya – flying laboratory)
A single An-24A, decommissioned from passenger transport duty, was converted into an airborne experimental aircraft. The generic suffix LL can apply to any testbed, but in the case of the An-24, it stands for metrology (the science of measurement), which is used to test the airworthiness of production aircraft.
An-24LP (LesoPozharnyy – forest fire fighter)
Three An-24RV aircraft converted into fire bombers/cloud seeders by installing a tank in the cabin, optical smoke and flame detectors, provision for a thermal imager, racks for carrying flare dispensers and the ability to carry firefighters for para-dropping.
An-24LR-1 "Toros" (Ice Hummock)(Ledovyy Razvedchik – ice reconnaissance)
At least two An-24Bs converted to carry the "Toros" SLAR (sideways looking airborne radar) either side of the lower fuselage, for ice reconnaissance, guiding icebreakers, convoys and other shipping. (Note: The An-24 incident at Gambell, Alaska occurred 27 February 1974, when a Soviet Antonov An-24LR "Toros" (CCCP-47195) ice reconnaissance aircraft, low on fuel, carrying three crew members and twelve scientists, landed at Gambell Airport.)
An-24LR-2 "Nit" (Thread)
An observation aircraft type for surveying the natural resources of the earth and oceans of the world, modified from a single An-24B in 1978. Equipped with a large "Nit" SLAR pod on the side of the lower fuselage.
An-24PS (Poiskovo-Spasahtel'nyy – SAR)
A single An-24B aircraft converted for search and rescue duties, rejected after acceptance trials in favour of a derivative of the An-24RT.
An-24PRT
A search and rescue aircraft built from 12 modified An-24As. Some equipment was omitted to reduce production costs, but this did not hinder rescue operations.
An-24R
It was a prototype photo reconnaissance aircraft created by modifying a single An-24A, but since the An-30 was superior overall, it ended up serving as a test aircraft and was used to test the photographic cameras to be installed on the An-30.
An-24RR ([samolyot] Radiotsionnyy Razvedchik – radiation reconnaissance [aircraft])
Four aircraft converted as Nuclear, biological and chemical warfare reconnaissance versions of the An-24B, carrying RR8311-100 air sampling pods low on the forward fuselage and a sensor pod on a pylon on the port fuselage side.
An-24RT (Retranslyator – relay installation)
A few An-24T and An-24RT aircraft converted to Communications relay aircraft. Sometimes referred to as An-24Rt to differentiate from the An-24RT.
An-24T "Troyanda" (Ukrainian – rose)
An experimental aircraft created in 1968 by removing the winch and measuring equipment from an An-24T.From the 1960s the Soviet Union was faced with nuclear submarine threats that were virtually undetectable with the technology available. To assist in the development of advanced optical, chemical, sonic, infra-red and electromagnetic detection systems, several aircraft were built or modified as test-beds. One significant aircraft was the An-24T "Troyanda", which was built new, for the development of sonobuoy and infra-red detection systems. As well as equipment inside the cabin, sensors could be mounted in large teardrop fairings either side of the lower forward fuselage, and extra equipment could be carried in extended wing centre-section fairings.
An-24USh (Uchebno-Shturmanskiy (samolyot) – Navigator training aircraft)
Seven An-24Bs were converted to An-24USh navigator/air traffic controller trainers with five training stations and four standard rows of seats for trainees in waiting. Outwardly the USh was distinguishable by the bulged windows at each training station.
An-24AEW
In the early 1990s, North Korea installed N-019 Topaz pulse-Doppler radars on at least one of its An-24A aircraft in an attempt to achieve a rudimentary Airborne Early Warning capability.

=== Cancelled ===
An-24A
The aircraft was originally intended to be produced using the Kuznetsov NK-4 turboprop engine, but production was halted when the NK-4 was cancelled. The name was later reused for a production version using a different engine.
An-24D
A projected long-range airliner version of the An-24B with a single RU-19 booster jet engine in the starboard nacelle, stretched fuselage with seating for 60, strengthened structure and increased fuel capacity.
An-24K
An 18-seater civilian transport aircraft that was supposed to be operated by a private company's management design department, but it never reached the concept stage.
An-24AT
A 1962 project for a Tactical transport with rear loading ramp and powered by Isotov TV2-117DS coupled turboprops.
An-24AT-RD (RD – Reaktivnyye Dvigateli – jet engines)
The An-24AT tactical transport project with two turbojet boosters pod-mounted under the outer wings and a wider loading ramp.
An-24AT-U (Uskoriteli – boosters)
A projected Tactical transport from 1966 with three or five PRD-63 (Porokhovoy Raketnyy Dvigatel – gunpowder rocket engine) JATO bottles, wider cargo ramp and provision for up to three brake parachutes.
An-24T (Transportnyy – transport)
(first use) Tactical transport version, rejected due to poor field performance and range, together with inability to load or air-drop vehicles during acceptance testing.

=== Advanced ===
An-26
Tactical transport with cargo ramp.
An-30
Survey/photo-mapping aircraft.
An-32
Designed to withstand adverse weather conditions better than the standard An-26.
An-34
The initial designation of the An-24T production tactical transport.
An-44
Projected cargo aircraft developed from the An-24. Ice reconnaissance and transport versions were also planned.
An-50
A mid-1960s project for a jet-powered An-24, with four Ivchenko AI-25 turbofan engines in podded pairs, pylon mounted forward of the wings. Not proceeded with due to competition from the Yak-40.
Xian Y-7
The Y-7 is a Chinese built derivative of the An-24/An-26 family.
MA60
Upgraded and Westernised Y-7.

== Operators ==
=== Military operators ===
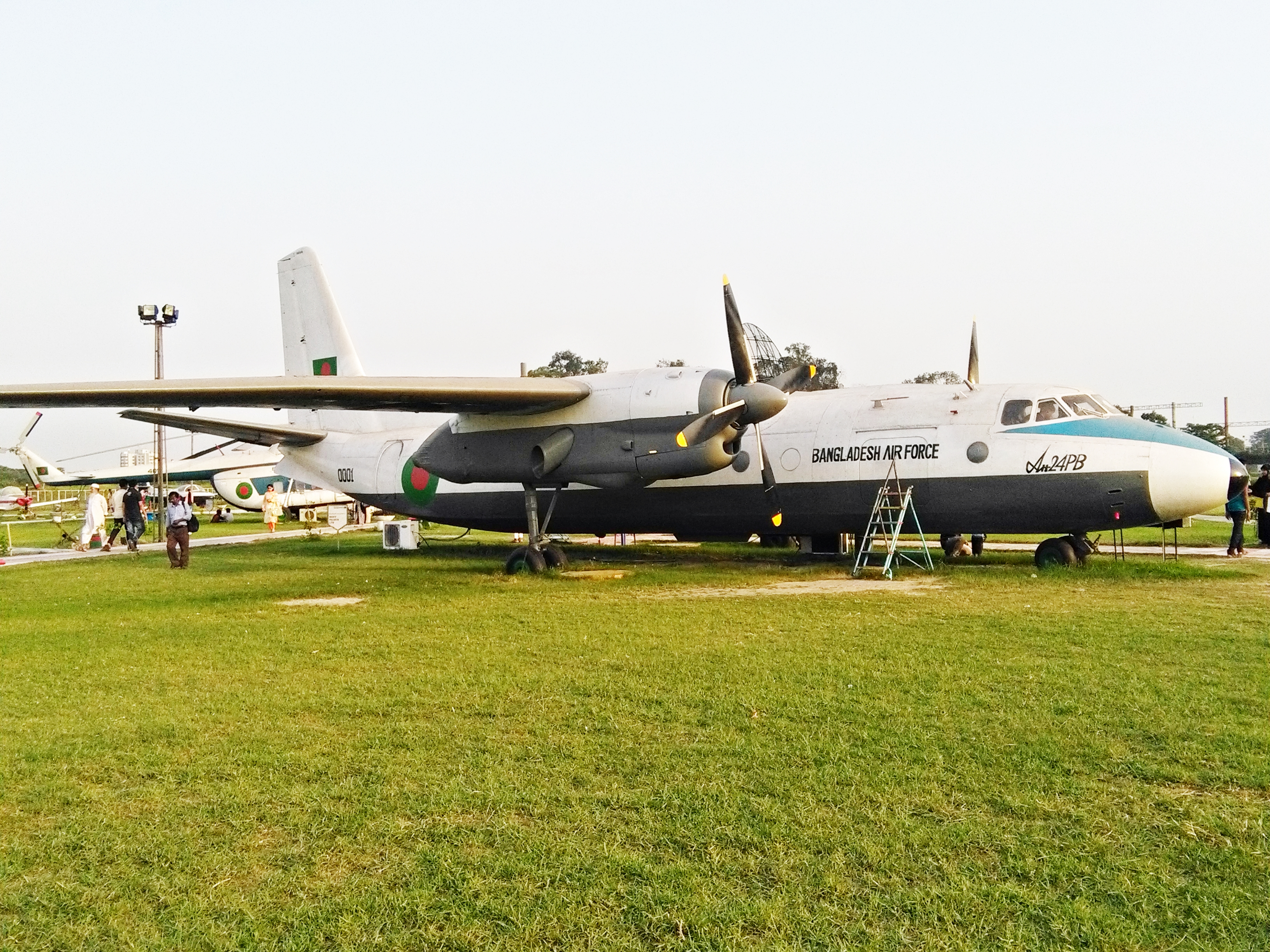
Antonov An 24PB of Bangladesh Air Force, displayed at Bangladesh Air Force museum

Cambodia
Royal Cambodian Air Force – 2
North Korea
Korean People's Army Air Force – 1 (converted to a rudimentary airborne early-warning aircraft)
Russia

- Russian Air Force
- Russian Naval Aviation

Ukraine

- Ukrainian Air Force

==== Former military operators ====
Afghanistan
The Afghan Air Force received six from 1975 (An-24TV)
Algeria
Algerian Air Force (Six An-24Vs)
Angola
People's Air and Air Defence Force of Angola (Six An-24Vs)
Armenia
Armenian Air Force (One An-24V)
Azerbaijan
Azerbaijan Air Force (One An-24V)
Bangladesh
Bangladesh Air Force (One An-24V)
Belarus
Belarus Air Force (2 An-24Bs)
Bulgaria
Bulgaria Air Force (One An-24V)
People's Republic of China

- People's Liberation Army Air Force; as Xian Y-7
- People's Liberation Army Navy Air Force

Republic of the Congo
Congolese Air Force
Cuba
Cuban Air Force – Twenty An-24RVs were ordered in 1962 and gradually introduced for transport purposes, but currently only three are deployed.
Czech Republic
Czech Air Force (before 2005)
Czechoslovakia
Czechoslovak Air Force – No longer in service
German Democratic Republic
Air Forces of the National People's Army
Egypt
Egyptian Air Force
Georgia
Georgian Air Force
Guinea
Military of Guinea
Guinea-Bissau
Military of Guinea-Bissau
Equatorial Guinea
Equatorial Guinea Air Force
Hungary
Hungarian Air Force, none in service, all retired in 1992
Iran
Iranian Air Force
Iraq
Iraqi Air Force
Kazakhstan
Military of Kazakhstan
Laos

- Pathet Lao
- Lao People's Liberation Army Air Force

Lithuania

- Lithuanian Air Force

Mali
Air Force of Mali – two
Moldova
Moldovan Air Force
Mozambique
Military of Mozambique
Nicaragua
Nicaraguan Air Force
North Yemen
Yemen Arab Republic Air Force: three bought in 1979
Poland
Polish Air Force – 6 operated from 1966 to 1977; replaced with An-26
Romania
Romanian Air Force – the last RoAF An-24 was retired in 2007.
Slovakia
Slovak Air Force – the last SAF An-24 was retired in 2006.
Somalia
Somali Air Corps
USSR

- Soviet Air Force
- Soviet Naval Aviation

Sudan
Sudanese Air Force – at least five An-24TVs purchased from the USSR in the late 1960s. Retired in the late 1990s.
Syria
Syrian Arab Air Force – 1 as of 2023. The Syrian government of Al-Assad fell to rebels in late 2024, and the Syrian Arab Air Force was dismantled. It was re-established as the Syrian Air Force, but the revolution, and the Israeli air strikes that followed it, wrecked havoc on the inventory of the Air Force. In late 2025, the World Air Forces publication by FlightGlobal, which tracks the aircraft inventories of world's air forces and publishes its counts annually, removed all Syrian Air Force's aircraft from their World Air Forces 2026 report. It is thus questionable if the Syrian Air Force has any flying aircraft in their inventory, and in particular, any An-24, as of December 2025.
Turkmenistan
Military of Turkmenistan
Uzbekistan
Military of Uzbekistan
Vietnam
Vietnam People's Air Force
Yemen
Yemen Air Force

=== Civil operators ===
As of July 2018, 86 An-24s were in airline service.

Following fatal incidents in July 2011 Russian President Dmitry Medvedev proposed the accelerated decommissioning of An-24s, which resulted in a ban for this type from scheduled flights inside Russia. However, later the ban was cancelled and, as of 2023, An-24 are still in limited commercial service in Russia.

Kazakhstan

- SCAT Airlines (7)

Moldova

- Air Moldova (6) Used on flights to CIS states and as charter aircraft

Russia

- Angara Airlines (5)
- Komiaviatrans (2)
- ALROSA (airline) (3)
- IrAero (11)
- KrasAvia (3)
- Khabarovsk Airlines (4)
- Polar Airlines (13) Largest passenger operator of An-24
- Yakutia Airlines (4)

Thailand

- Phetchabun Airlines (1)

Ukraine

- Motor Sich Airlines (3)

==== Former civil operators ====
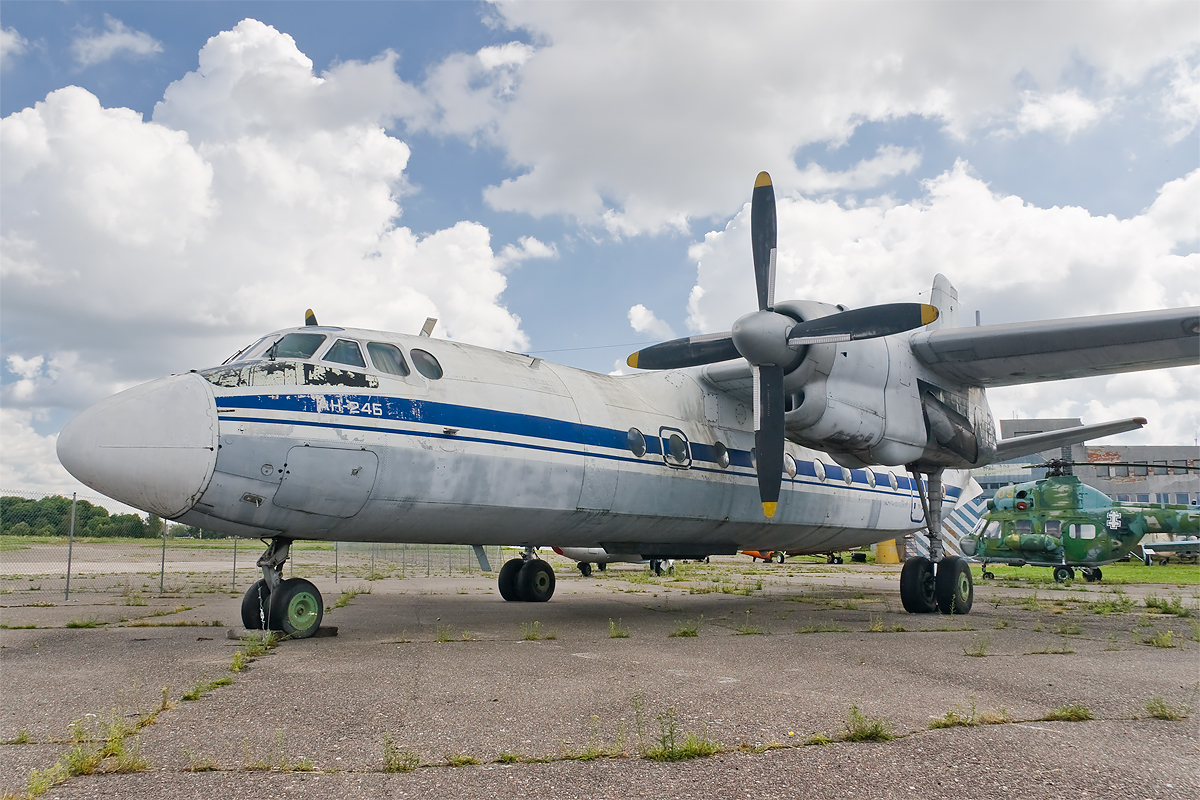
Preserved An-24 at S. Darius and S. Girėnas Airport, Lithuania

Civil operators have included:

Africa

- Pan African Air Services

Afghanistan

- Ariana Afghan Airlines
- Pamir Airways

Belarus

- Belavia

Bulgaria

- Balkan Bulgarian Airlines

Cambodia

- PMTair
- President Airlines
- Royal Khmer Airlines

People's Republic of China

- CAAC Airlines
- China Southern Airlines

Congo

- Lina Congo

Cuba

- Aero Caribbean – It operated one An-24B.
- Cubana – It operated the An-24B, An-24V and An-24RV. As of January 2025, five aircraft have been totally lost in crashes (CU-T875 (An-24V), CU-T1262 (AN-24RV), CU-T1295 (An-24RV), CU-T876 (An-24V), CU-T879 (An-24B)).

German Democratic Republic

- Interflug

Egypt

- Egyptair
- Misrair

Guinea

- Air Guinee
- Union des Transports Africains (West Coast Airways)

Iraq

- Iraqi Airways – An-24B, An-24V, An-24RV, An-24TV

Kazakhstan

- Air Kazakhstan

Kyrgyzstan

- Kyrgyzstan Air Company

Laos

- Lao Aviation

Lithuania

- Lithuanian Airlines, 1991–1996

Lebanon

- Lebanese Air Transport

Mali

- Air Mali (1960-1989)

Mongolia

- MIAT Mongolian Airlines
- Hangard Airlines

North Korea

- Air Koryo

Pakistan

- Askari Aviation

Philippines

- Mosphil Aero

Poland

- LOT Polish Airlines

Romania

- TAROM

Russia

- Aeroflot
- Novosibirsk Air Enterprise
- UT Air

Somalia

- Jubba Airways

USSR

- Aeroflot

Sri Lanka

- Lionair

Sudan

- Marsland Aviation

Turkmenistan

- Turkmenistan Airlines (22)

Ukraine

- Aerosvit

United Arab Emirates

- Daallo Airlines

Uzbekistan

- Uzbekistan Airways

An-24 operators within Aeroflot and post-Soviet countries
UGA – (Oopravleniye Grazhdahnskoy Aviahtsii – Civil Aviation Directorate)	OAO – (Otdel'nyy Aviaotryad – independent flight detachment)	LO – (Lyotnyy Otryad – flight squad) / (Aviaeskadril'ya – squadrons)	Home base	CIS (Commonwealth of Independent States) airline
Arkhangelsk	2nd Arkhangelsk	392nd	Arkhangelsk-Vaskovo	AVL Arkhangelsk Airlines
Azerbaijan	Baku	360th / 1st & 3rd squadrons	Baku-Bina	AZAL (no An-24s)
Belorussian	Gomel	105th / 1st squadron	Gomel	Gomelavia
	1st Minsk	353rd	Minsk-Loshitsa (Minsk-1)	Belavia;Minsk-Avia
	Mogilyov		Mogilev	Mogilev-Avia
Central Regions	Belgorod		Belgorod	Belgorod Air Enterprise (no An-24s)
	Bryansk		Bryansk	Bravia (Bryansk-Avia)
	Bykovo	61st	Moscow-Bykovo	Bykovo Avia
	Ivanovo		Ivanovo-Yuzhnyy (Zhukovka)	IGAP (Ivanovo State Air Enterprise)
	Kostroma		Kostroma	Kostroma Air Enterprise
	Kursk		Kursk	Kurskavia
	Ryazan		Ryazan	Ryazan aviatrans
	Tambov	169th	Tambov-Donskoye	Aviata (Avalinii Tambova)
	Tula	294th	Tula	Tula Air Enterprise
	Voronezh	243rd	Voronezh	Voronezhavia
	Vladimir		Vladimir	Vladimir Air Enterprise / Avialeso'okhrana
East Siberian	Bobaido		Bobaido	Bobaido Air Enterprise
	Chita	136th / 1st Squadron	Chita	Chita Avia
	Irkutsk	134th	Irkutsk-1	Baikal Airlines
	Ust-Ilimsk		Ust-Ilimsk	Ust-Ilimsk Air Enterprise
	Ust-Kut		Ust-Kut	Ust-Kut Air Enterprise
	Ulan-Ude	138th	Ulan-Ude / Mukhino	Buryatia Airlines
Far Eastern	Sakhalin CAPA / Yuzhno-Sakhalinsk UAD	147th / 1st Squadron	Yuzhno-Sakhalinsk / Khomutvo	Sakhalinskiye Aviatrassy
	1st Khabarovsk	289th	Khabarovsk	Dalavia Far East Airlines Khabarovsk
Kazakh	Chimkent	158th	Chimkent	Kazakhstan Airlines;Chimkent-Avia
	Guryev	156th	Guryev	Kazakhstan Airlines;Atyrau Air Ways
	Karaganda	14th	Karaganda	Kazakhstan Airlines
	Kostanay	155th	Kostanay	Kazakhstan Airlines
	Tselinograd	239th	Tselinograd	Kazakhstan Airlines;Air Astana
Kirghiz	(dissolved by 1987)			
Komi	Syktyvkar	366th	Syktyvkar	Komiavia;Komiinteravia
Krasnoyarsk	Abakan	130th	Abakan	Khakassia Airlines (Abakan A.E.)
Latvian	Riga	106th / 2nd Squadron	Riga-Spilve	Latavio
Leningrad	Pskov	320th / 2nd Squadron	Pskov	
Lithuanian	Vilnius	277th / 4th Squadron	Vilnius	Lithuanian Airlines
Magadan	Anadyr'		Anadyr'-Ugol'nyy	Chukotavia
	Chaunskoye	6th	Chaunskoye	Chaunskoye Air Enterprise
	1st Magadan	185th / (1st or 3rd Squadron)	Magadan-Sokol	Kolyma-Avia
Moldavian	Kishinyov	407th	Kishinyov	Air Moldova
North Caucasian	Astrakhan'	110th	Astrakhan'-Narimanovo	Astrakhan' Airlines
	Krasnodar	241st/ 3rd Squadron	Krasnodar	ALK Kuban Airlines
	Makhachkala	111th	Makhachkala	Daghestan Airlines
	Stavropol'		Stavropol'	SAAK (Stavropol' Joint Stock AL)
	Taganrog		Taganrog	Tavia
Tajik	Leninabad	292nd / 2nd Squadron	Leninabad	Tajikistan Airlines
Training Establishments Directorate	KVLUGA (Kirovograd Civil Aviation Higher Flying School)		Kirovograd	Ukraine State Flight Academy
Turkmen	Ashkhabad	165th / 1st Squadron	Ashkhabad	Turkmenistan Airlines/Akhal
	Krasnovodsk	360th / 1st Squadron	Krasnovodsk	Turkmenistan Airlines/Khazar
	Mary Composite Independent Air Squadron		Mary	
	Tashauz		Tashauz	
Tyumen'	Salekhard		Salekhard	Tyumen' Avia Trans
	Surgut	358th	Surgut	Surgut Avia
Ukrainian	Donetsk		Donetsk	Donbas – East Ukrainian Airlines
	Kyiv	86th / 2nd Squadron	Kyiv-Zhulyany	Air Ukraine / Avialinïi Ukraïny
	Kirovograd		Kirovograd-Khmelyovoye	Air URGA
	Lviv	88th	Lviv	Lviv Airlines
	Simferopol	84th	Simferopol	Aviakompaniya Krym / Crimea AL
	Voroshilovgrad		Voroshilovgrad	
Urals	Izhevsk		Izhevsk	Izhavia
	Kirov		Kirov	Kirov Air Enterprises (no An-24s)
	Magnitogorsk		Magnitogorsk	Magnitogorsk Air Enterprise
	1st Perm'		Perm'-Bolshoye Savino	Perm Airlines
	1st Sverdlovsk		Sverdlovsk-Kol'tsovo	Ural Airlines [Yekaterinburg]
Uzbek	Samarkand	163rd	Samarkand	Uzbekistan Airways
	Tashkent	160th	Tashkent-Yuzhnyy	Uzbekistan Airways
Volga	Cheboksary		Cheboksary	Cheboksary Air Enterprise
	Cheboksary	Nizhnekamsk Independent air Squadron	Nizhnekamsk	Nizhnekamsk Air Enterprise
	Gorky		Gorky-Strigino	Nizhegorodskie Airlines (sic)
	TatarCAPA / 1st Kazan	408th	Kazan	Tatarstan Airlines
	Orenburg	195th / 2nd Squadron	Orenburg-Tsentral'nyy	Orenburg Airlines
	Penza	396th	Penza	Penza Air Enterprise
	Saransk		Saransk	
	Saratov		Saratov	
	Ufa	415th	Ufa	BAL Bashkirian Airlines
	Yoshkar-Ola		Yoshkar-Ola	
West Siberian	Kemerovo	196th	Kemerovo	
	Kolpashevo		Kolpashevo	
	Novosibirsk	6th(?)	Novosibirsk-Severnyy	2nd Novosibirsk Air Enterprise
	Tolmachevo	448th	Novosibirsk-Tolmachevo	Sibir'
	Novokuznetsk	184th	Novokuznetsk	Aerokuznetsk
	Omsk	365th / 2nd Squadron	Omsk	Omsk-Avia
	Tomsk	119th	Tomsk	Tomsk Avia
Yakutian	Yakutsk	271st	Yakutsk	Sakha Avia
	Mirny		Mirny	Almazy Rossii – Sakha (Alrosa)
GosNII GVF ("state scientific test institute for civil air fleet")			Moscow – Sheremetyevo-1	

== Specifications (An-24V) ==

Data from Jane's All the World's Aircraft 1976–77

General characteristics

- Crew: 3
- Capacity: 50 passengers
- Length: 23.53 m (77 ft 2 in)
- Wingspan: 29.20 m (95 ft 10 in)
- Height: 8.32 m (27 ft 4 in)
- Wing area: 74.98 m^{2} (807.1 sq ft)
- Aspect ratio: 11.7:1
- Empty weight: 13,300 kg (29,321 lb)
- Max takeoff weight: 21,000 kg (46,297 lb)
- Fuel capacity: 5,550 L (1,470 US gal; 1,220 imp gal)
- Powerplant: 2 × Ivchenko AI-24A turboprop engines, 1,900 kW (2,550 shp) each (eshp)
- Propellers: 4-bladed AV-72 constant-speed propellers, 3.90 m (12 ft 10 in) diameter

Performance

- Maximum speed: 485 km/h (301 mph, 262 kn) at 6,000 m (20,000 ft)
- Cruise speed: 450 km/h (280 mph, 240 kn) at 6,000 m (20,000 ft)
- Range: 2,400 km (1,500 mi, 1,300 nmi) with maximum fuel; 550 km (340 mi; 300 nmi) with maximum payload
- Service ceiling: 8,400 m (27,600 ft)
- Time to altitude:
  - 17.5 min to 6,000 m (20,000 ft)
  - 45.2 min to 8,100 m (26,600 ft)

== See also ==
Related development

- Antonov An-26
- Antonov An-30
- Antonov An-32
- Antonov An-50
- Antonov/Taqnia An-132
- Xian MA60

Aircraft of comparable role, configuration, and era

- Fokker F27
- Hawker Siddeley HS 748
- Handley Page Dart Herald

Related lists

- List of civil aircraft
- List of military aircraft of the Soviet Union and the CIS
