= Skyservice =

Skyservice or sky service may refer to:

- Skyservice Airlines, a defunct chartered airline based in Toronto
- Skyservice Investments, Canadian operator and provider of business aviation services
  - Skyservice Business Aviation, FBO and business jet operator headquartered in Toronto, with bases in Montreal, Calgary and Ottawa
- Skyservice Air Ambulance, Air Ambulance operator headquartered in Montreal, with a base in Toronto
- Skyservice USA
- Sky Service (Belgium), a defunct Belgian airline
- Sky Service (Kazakhstan), chartered airline
- Sky Service Aviation, a defunct charter airline based in Madrid, Spain
