= EAK =

EAK may refer to:

- Euro-Asia Air
- Evangelical Working Group of the CDU/CSU
- Kenya, international vehicle registration codes

== See also ==
- Jewish Anti-Fascist Committee (Russian: Еврейский антифашистский комитет, ЕАК)
