= Chuvashia Airlines =

Airline based in Chuvashia, Russia

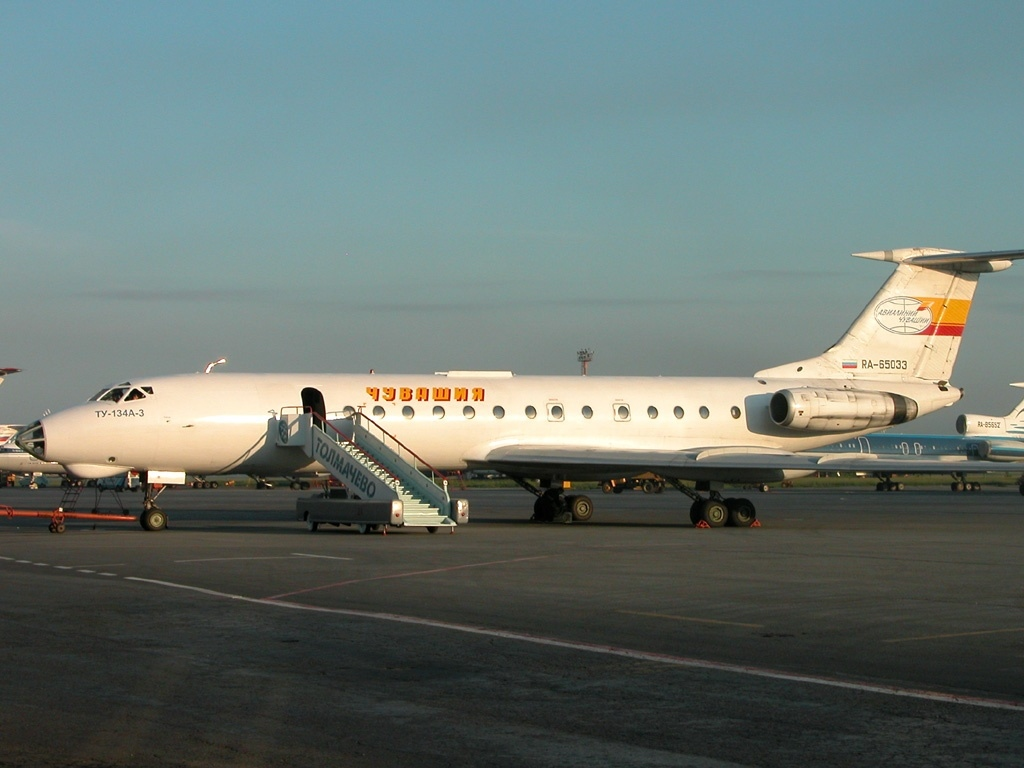
| IATA | ICAO | Call sign |
|---|---|---|
| — | CBK | — |
- Founded: 1993
- Ceased operations: 2009
- Operating bases: Cheboksary Airport
- Headquarters: Cheboksary, Chuvashia, Russia

Chuvashia Airlines was an airline based in Cheboksary, Chuvashia, Russia. It operated domestic passenger services and charters. Its main base was Cheboksary Airport. Operations ceased in 2009

== History ==
The airline was established in 1993 as Cheboksary Air Enterprise and was renamed Chuvashia Airlines in 2003.

== Fleet ==
The Chuvashia Airlines is believed to operate the following aircraft (at March 2007):

- 1 Antonov An-26
- small fleet of Tupolev Tu-134A aircraft

=== Previously operated ===
At January 2005 the airline also operated:

- 1 Antonov An-24B
- 1 Antonov An-24RV
