= Kirov Air Enterprise =

Russian regional airline

Kirov Airline
IATA	ICAO	Call sign
—	KTA	—
- Commenced operations: 1992
- Ceased operations: March 30, 2012
- Operating bases: Kirov Pobedilovo Airport
- Headquarters: Kirov, Kirov Oblast, Russia

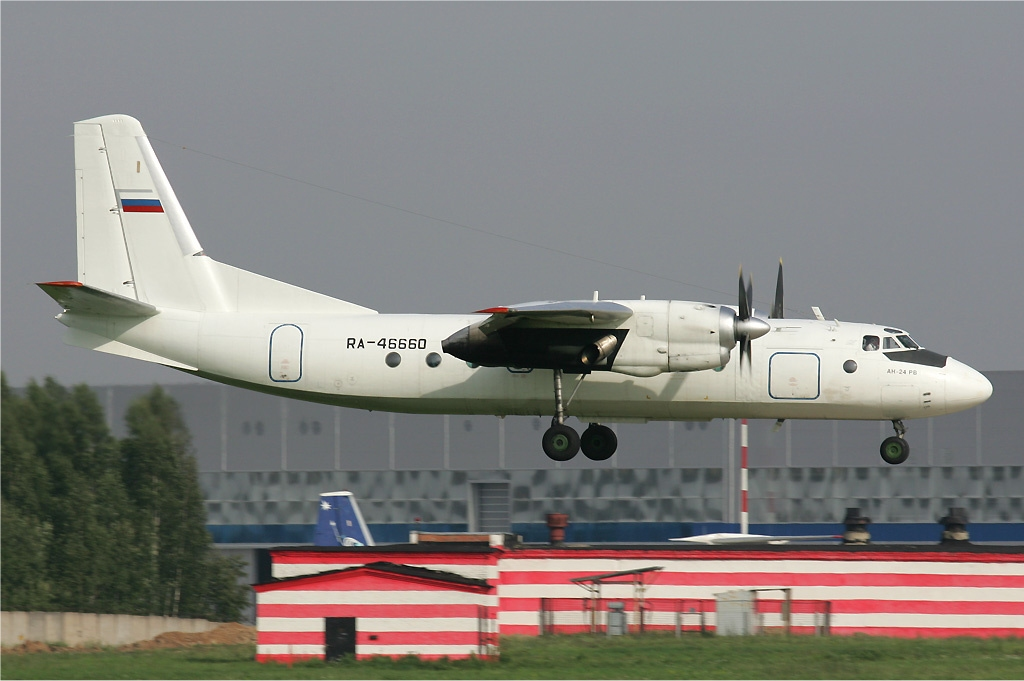
Kirov Air Enterprise Antonov An-24

Kirov Airline was an airline based in Kirov, Russia. It operated regional scheduled and charter passenger services within Russia and the Commonwealth of Independent States. Its main base was Kirov Pobedilovo Airport. Its license was revoked on 30 March 2012.

== Code data ==
- ICAO Code: KTA

== History ==
The airline was established in 1992 from the Aeroflot Kirov Division.
