= Irtysh Air =

Airline of Kazakhstan

Irtysh Air Иртыш-Аир
IATA	ICAO	Call sign
IH	MZA	AZAMAT
- Founded: 2007
- Commenced operations: 22 April 2009
- Ceased operations: 2013
- Operating bases: Pavlodar Airport
- Hubs: Almaty International Airport
- Fleet size: 3
- Destinations: 6
- Headquarters: Ekibastuz, Pavlodar Province, Kazakhstan
- Website: www.irtyshair.kz

Irtysh-Air (Kazakh: АО Авиакомпания "Иртыш-Аир", romanized: AO Avıakompanııa "Irtysh-Aır") was an airline headquartered in Ekibastuz, Pavlodar Province, Kazakhstan. Despite the airline being based at Pavlodar Airport, it operated a domestic network within that country from its hub in Almaty International Airport. Irtysh-Air ceased operations in 2013.

== History ==
Irtysh-Air started operations on 22 April 2009 with a Pavlodar–Moscow-Domodedovo service.

On May 11, 2010, following the results of a competition for domestic routes held by the Civil Aviation Committee of the Ministry of Transport and Communications of the Republic of Kazakhstan, Irtysh-Air Airlines received certificates for the following air routes:

- Almaty – Pavlodar, Almaty – Karaganda, Almaty – Oskemen, Almaty – Kyzylorda, Almaty – Kostanay

In July 2013, following the Ministry of Transport and Communications revoking the operator's certificate to three airlines, it was informed that Irtysh-Air could also lose its license.

On 18 October 2013, the AOC of Irtysh-Air was suspended for a further unspecified period.

Its certificate expired on 4 April 2014. As of 23 February 2025, Irtysh Air does not exist in the "List of operating airlines and operators of the Republic of Kazakhstan."

== Destinations ==
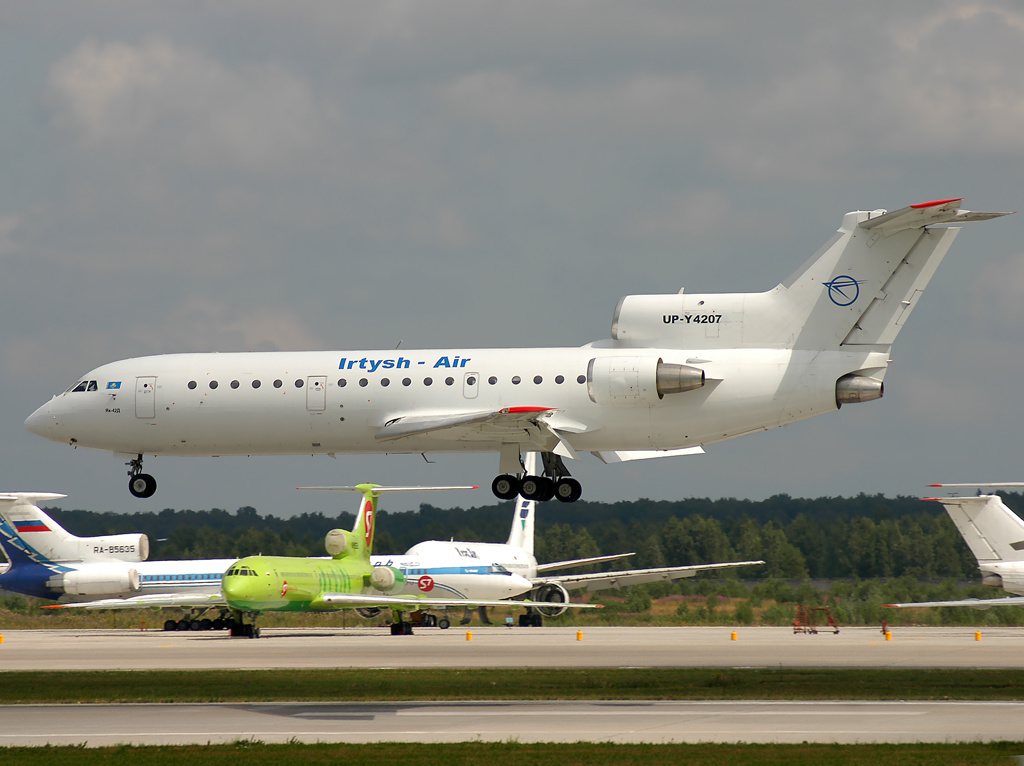
An Irtysh-Air Yakovlev Yak-42D at Domodedovo Airport (2009)

Before ceasing operations in 2013, the Airline served the following destinations:

=== Kazakhstan ===
- Almaty – Almaty International Airport
- Karaganda – Karaganda Airport
- Kostanay – Narimanovka Airport
- Kyzylorda – Kyzylorda Airport
- Oskemen – Oskemen Airport
- Pavlodar – Pavlodar Airport

=== Terminated destinations ===
==== Russia ====
- Moscow – Domodedovo International Airport

== Fleet ==
The Irtysh-Air fleet comprised the following aircraft:

Irtysh-Air fleet
Aircraft	In fleet	Orders	Passengers	Notes
CRJ-100	2	0	50	Leased from SAPSAN
Yak-42	1	0	104/120	

== See also ==
- List of airlines of Kazakhstan
- Transport in Kazakhstan
