= Mosphil Aero =

Airline closed in 2006

IATA	ICAO	Call sign
-	MPI	MOSPHIL
- Founded: 2005; 20 years ago
- Commenced operations: 2006
- Ceased operations: 2006
- Hubs: Zamboanga International Airport
- Fleet size: 1
- Destinations: 4
- Parent company: Mosphil Aero inc.
- Headquarters: Makati, Philippines
- Key people: Glenn Lamela

Mosphil Aero was an airline based in Makati, Manila, Philippines. It operated domestic passenger and cargo services around the southern Philippines, primarily from Zamboanga International Airport.

The airline has shown interest in focusing on the special region known as the BIMP-EAGA Region (Brunei, Indonesia, Malaysia, Philippines, East Asean Growth Area). There have been air pacts and agreements in this region, that Mosphil intended to take advantage of. Routes to and from Davao, Kota Kinabalu and Manado, Indonesia, were likely in the future, according to Lamela, the airline's sales and marketing director.

== History ==
Mosphil was founded in 2005 and the airline started operations in November 2006, backed by Russian interests. Mosphil Aero planned the start of a Zamboanga City-Sandakan-Kota Kinabalu route on 30 August 2006. Aircraft initially were operated by Russian crews while the Filipino pilots underwent training at the Antonov Training Center in Kyiv, Ukraine. Following a test flight in late August 2006, Mosphil Aero operated its first commercial flight from Zamboanga to Sandakan and back on 12 November 2006 using an Antonov An-24 aircraft with a Russian crew. Mosphil Aero's operation lasted slightly over two months.

== Destinations ==
Mosphil operated the following services (at November 2006):

- Zamboanga to Sandakan (3x a week)
- Zamboanga to Tawi-Tawi (2x a week)
- Zamboanga to Jolo (2x a week)

== Fleet ==
As of March 2009 the Mosphil Aero fleet included the following aircraft:

- 1 × Antonov An-24B
