= Orient Eagle Airways =

Airline of Kazakhstan

IATA	ICAO	Call sign
4R	OEG	—
- Founded: 1997
- Commenced operations: 1998
- Ceased operations: 2002
- Headquarters: Almaty

Orient Eagle Airways was an airline based in Kazakhstan, operating VIP charter flights for the Government of Kazakhstan.

== History ==
The airline was founded in late 1997 and acquired two aircraft: A Boeing 737-200 (which was written off in 1998, see below) and a larger Boeing 757-200. The latter was sold to Berkut Air in early 2002, marking the moment when Orient Eagle Airways was shut down.

== Accidents and incidents ==
- On 12 April 1998 at 08:48 UTC, the Boeing 737-200 of Orient Eagle Airways (registered P4-NEN) overran the runway at Almaty International Airport in a bad-weather landing. The right main landing gear collapsed, damaging the aircraft beyond repair. All 80 passengers and 8 crew members on board survived.
