= Atyrau Airways =

Airline of Kazakhstan

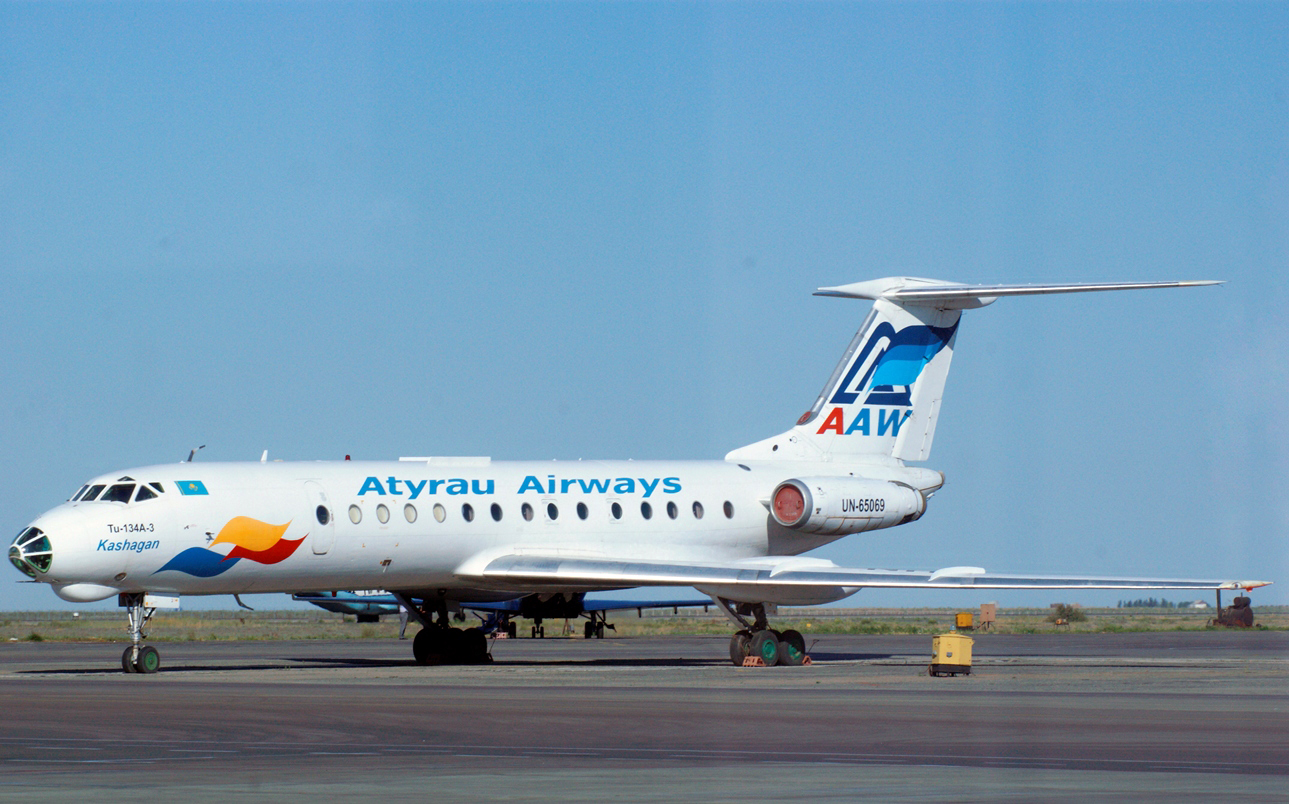
- A TU 134 of Atyrau Airways
IATA	ICAO	Call sign
IP	JOL	EDIL
- Founded: 1996
- Ceased operations: 2009
- Operating bases: Atyrau Airport
- Fleet size: 4 (upon closure)
- Parent company: Euro-Asia Air
- Headquarters: Atyrau, Kazakhstan

Atyrau Airways was an airline based in Atyrau, Kazakhstan. It operated scheduled and chartered passenger flights within the CIS and to destinations in Europe out of its base at Atyrau Airport, using a fleet of four Tupolev Tu-134A aircraft.

== History ==
Atyrau Airways was established in 1996 as an airline as well as the operating company of Atyrau Airport. It became part of the Air Kazakhstan Group (which also comprised Air Kazakhstan and Irtysh Avia) in December 1999. In November 2000, the ownership of Atyrau Airways and Airport was transferred to Euro-Asia Air, a subsidiary of state petroleum company KazTransOil. On 13 July 2009, Atyrau Airways was included in the List of air carriers banned in the European Union, along with all other Kazakh airlines with the exception of Air Astana due to the poor maintenance record of the country. Shortly thereafter (in October), its airline license was revoked.
