= Asia Continental Airlines =

Airline of Kazakhstan

IATA	ICAO	Call sign
—	CID; RRK	ACID
- Founded: 1999
- Ceased operations: 18 October 2010
- Hubs: Almaty International Airport
- Headquarters: Almaty, Kazakhstan

Asia Continental Airlines (or Asia Continental Avialines) was an airline based in Almaty, Kazakhstan, operating charter flights out of Almaty International Airport. The company was founded in 1999. On 18 October 2010, it had its airline license revoked.

== Fleet ==
Asia Continental Airlines operated the following aircraft types:

- Antonov An-24
- Antonov An-26
- Boeing 737-800
- Ilyushin Il-76
- Yakovlev Yak-40

== Accidents and incidents ==
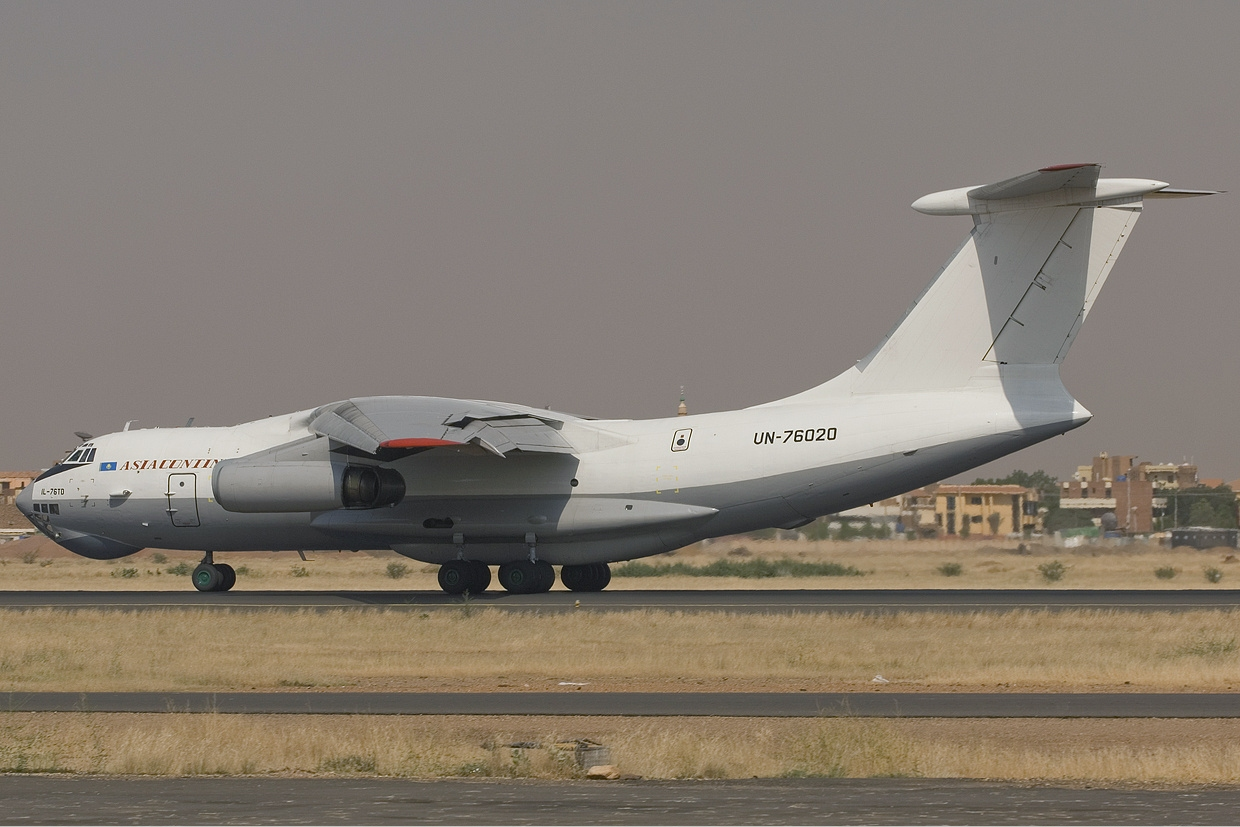
The Il-76 involved in the accident on 14 February 2008 is seen here at Khartoum International Airport in 2007.

- On 14 February 2008, an Asia Continental Airlines Ilyushin Il-76 (registered UN-76020) was damaged beyond repair in an engine fire at Kandahar Airport, Afghanistan.
