= Caspiy =

Airline of Kazakhstan

IATA	ICAO	Call sign
IV	TLG	-
- Founded: 2011
- Commenced operations: 2011
- Ceased operations: 2014
- Operating bases: Aktau Airport
- Fleet size: 4
- Headquarters: Aktau, Mangystau Province, Kazakhstan
- Website: http://www.caspiy.kz

Caspiy was an airline in Kazakhstan.

== Fleet ==
The Caspiy fleet consisted of the following aircraft:

Bek Air fleet
Aircraft	In fleet	Passengers	Notes
Fokker 100	4	98	
