= 1996 Charkhi Dadri mid-air collision =

1996 mid-air collision over India

1996 Charkhi Dadri mid-air collision Saudia Flight 763 · Kazakhstan Airlines Flight 1907
Accident
- Date: 12 November 1996
- Summary: Mid-air collision due to pilot error on the Il-76
- Site: Charkhi Dadri, Haryana, India; 28°33′38″N 76°18′15″E
- Total fatalities: 349
- Total survivors: 0

First aircraft
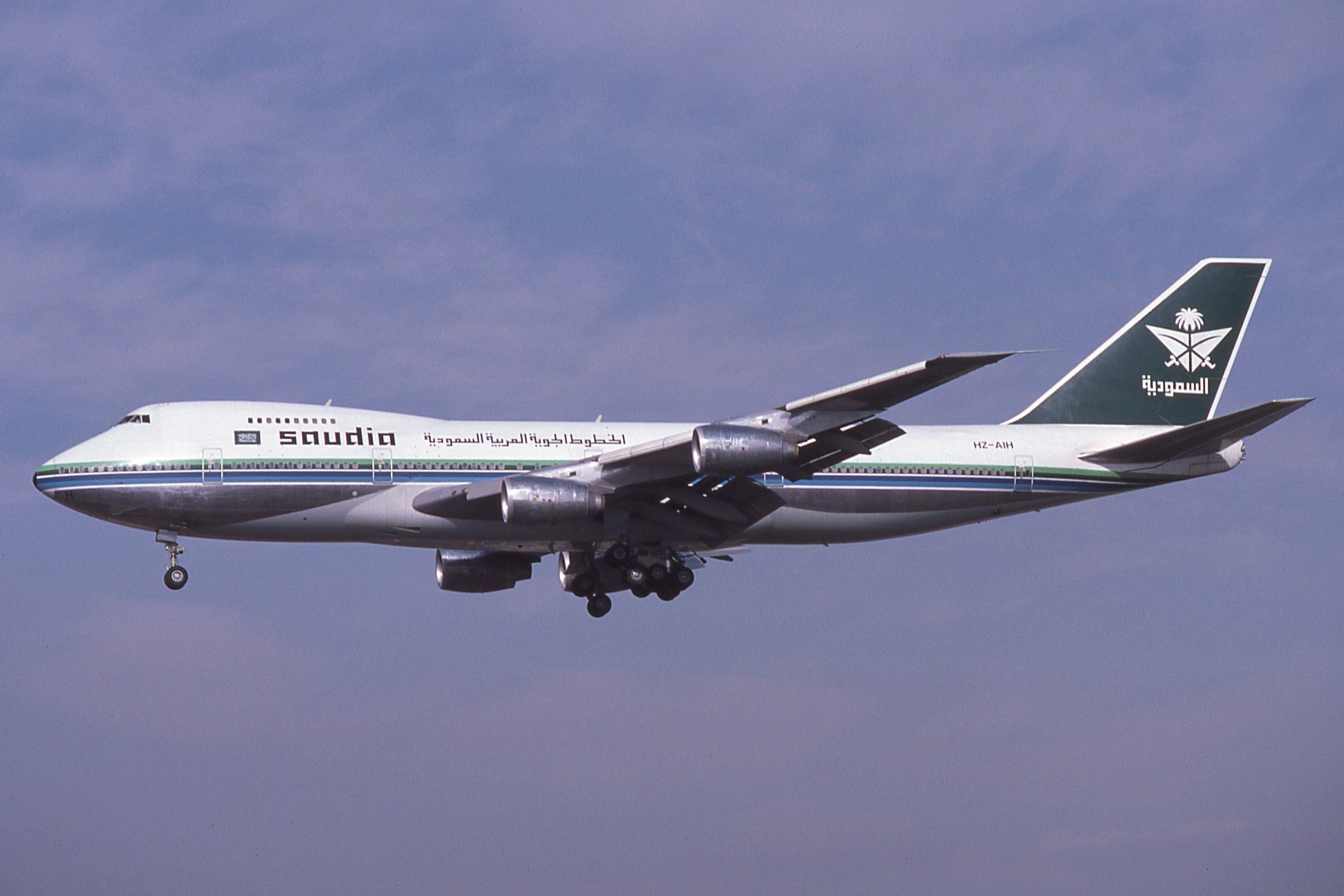
- HZ-AIH, the Boeing 747-168B involved in the collision, seen in 1986
- Type: Boeing 747-168B
- Operator: Saudia
- IATA flight No.: SV763
- ICAO flight No.: SVA763
- Call sign: SAUDIA 763
- Registration: HZ-AIH
- Flight origin: Indira Gandhi International Airport, Delhi, India
- Stopover: Dhahran International Airport, Dhahran, Saudi Arabia
- Destination: King Abdulaziz International Airport, Jeddah, Saudi Arabia
- Occupants: 312
- Passengers: 289
- Crew: 23
- Fatalities: 312
- Survivors: 0

Second aircraft
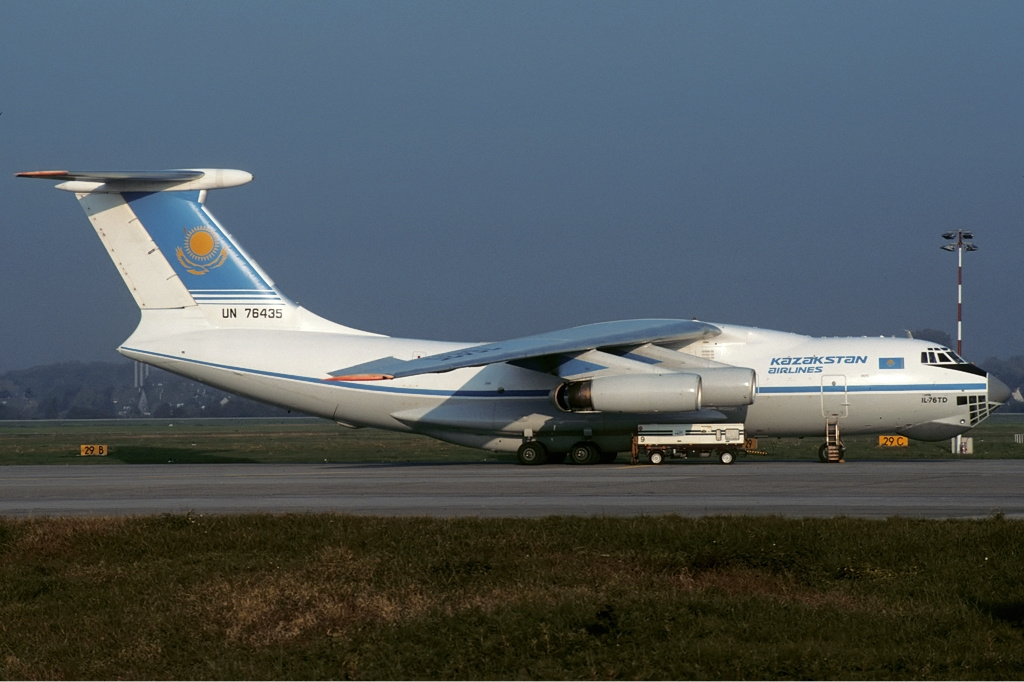
- UN-76435, the Ilyushin Il-76TD involved in the collision, seen in 1994
- Type: Ilyushin Il-76TD
- Operator: Kazakhstan Airlines
- IATA flight No.: KZ1907
- ICAO flight No.: KZA1907
- Call sign: KAZAKH 1907
- Registration: UN-76435
- Flight origin: Shymkent International Airport, Shymkent, Kazakhstan
- Destination: Indira Gandhi International Airport, Delhi, India
- Occupants: 37
- Passengers: 27
- Crew: 10
- Fatalities: 37
- Survivors: 0

On 12 November 1996, Saudia Flight 763, a Boeing 747-100B en route from Delhi, India to Jeddah with a stopover in Dhahran, Saudi Arabia, and Kazakhstan Airlines Flight 1907, an Ilyushin Il-76 en route from Shymkent, Kazakhstan to Delhi, collided over the city of Charkhi Dadri in the state of Haryana, around 100 kilometres (62 mi; 54 nmi) west of Delhi. The crash killed all 349 people on board both planes, making it the world's deadliest mid-air collision, the deadliest aviation accident without survivors, and the deadliest aviation accident in the Indian subcontinent.

The final report from the investigation revealed that the failure of Flight 1907's crew to maintain the correct altitude led to the collision. Contributing factors included the poor English language skills in the Il-76 cockpit, resulting in inadequate interpretation of directions provided by air traffic control, and three specific incidents of failures in crew resource management (CRM) by the Kazakh crew. The investigators noted the Indian airport lacked a secondary surveillance radar; the airport only had a primary radar, which produced readings of distance and bearing, but not altitude. The report also suggested technical enhancements (including ACAS and SSR) that would provide assistance in preventing a future crew's mistakes from being allowed to go unchecked in real time.

== Aircraft involved ==
=== Saudia Flight 763 ===
Saudia Flight 763 was a Boeing 747-168B, registration HZ-AIH, departing from Delhi as part of a scheduled international Delhi–Dhahran–Jeddah passenger service with 312 people on board. The crew on this flight consisted of Captain Khalid Al-Shubaily (aged 45), First Officer Nazir Khan (aged 37), and Flight Engineer Ahmed Edrees (aged 33). Al-Shubaily was a veteran pilot with 9,837 flying hours. Twelve of the crew members, including five anti-terrorism officials, were Saudi Arabian citizens.

Reports on the nationalities of the passengers of Flight 763 contain conflicting information. According to an article published in The New York Times on 13 November 1996, the passenger manifest included 17 people of other nationalities, including nine Nepalis, three Pakistanis, two Americans, one Bangladeshi, one British, and one Saudi. However, The New York Times followed up with another article, saying on 14 November 1996, claiming that the passenger manifest comprised 215 Indians (many of whom were working blue-collar jobs in Saudi Arabia), 40 Nepalis, and three Americans.

=== Kazakhstan Airlines Flight 1907 ===
Kazakhstan Airlines Flight 1907, an Ilyushin Il-76TD with registration UN-76435, was on a charter service from Shymkent International Airport to Delhi-Indira Gandhi. The crew consisted of Captain Alexander Robertovich Cherepanov (aged 44), First Officer Ermek Kozhahmetovich Dzhangirov (aged 37), Flight Engineer Alexander Alexanderovich Chuprov (aged 50), Navigator Zhahanbek Duisenovich Aripbaev (aged 51), and Radio Operator Egor Alekseevich Repp (aged 41). Cherepanov was highly experienced, with 9,229 flight hours.

A company from Kyrgyzstan chartered the flight, and the passenger manifest mostly included ethnic Russian Kyrgyz citizens planning to go shopping in India. Thirteen Kyrgyz traders boarded the flight.

== Accident ==
Saudia Flight 763 departed Delhi at 18:32 local time (13:02 UTC). Kazakhstan Airlines Flight 1907 was descending simultaneously to land at Delhi. Both flights were controlled by approach controller V.K. Dutta. Immediately after take-off, the Saudia flight was cleared to an initial altitude of 10,000 feet (3,050 m). At 18:34, Dutta cleared the Kazakh plane to descend to 15,000 feet (4,550 m) when it was 137 kilometres (74 nmi) from the beacon of the destination airport. Two minutes later, at 18:36, Dutta cleared the Saudia plane, travelling on the same airway but in the opposite direction, to climb to 14,000 feet (4,250 m). At 18:38, the Saudia crew reported reaching 14,000 feet and requested a higher level. Dutta told them to hold their altitude and standby, to which First Officer Khan replied, "Saudi 763 will maintain one four zero."

At 18:39, the Kazakh flight reported having reached its assigned altitude of 15,000 feet, but it was actually higher, at 16,348 feet (5,000 m), and still descending. At this time, Dutta advised the flight, "Identified traffic 12 O'Clock, reciprocal, Saudia Boeing 747 at ten miles, likely to cross in another five miles. Report, if in sight." Radio Operator Repp requested clarification, to which Dutta replied, "Traffic ... is at eight miles, level 140." Repp acknowledged the update, and signed off with, "Now looking 1907."

Less than a minute later, at 18:40, the crew of a United States Air Force cargo flight made a radio call saying they had seen "a big explosion" at their two o'clock position. Dutta attempted to contact the Saudia and Kazakh flights but received no response. The two aircraft had collided, with the left wing of the Kazakh flight slicing through the No. 1 and No. 2 engines of the Saudia 747 while the left horizontal stabilizer of the 747 sliced off the vertical stabilizer (including the horizontal stabilizer) of the Kazakh flight. The crippled Saudi Boeing immediately lost control and went into a rapidly descending spiral with fire trailing from the wing. The rear fuselage broke into several pieces, while the remaining engines also ripped away. The remains of the Saudia flight crashed into the ground at a nearly supersonic speed of 1,135 km/h (613 kn; 705 mph). With most of its left wing and vertical stabilizer gone, the Ilyushin went into a flat spin and crashed into a field at a flat attitude near the wreckage of the Saudia plane. All 312 people on board Saudia Flight 763 and all 37 people on Kazakhstan Airlines Flight 1907 were killed.

The recorder of the Saudi Arabian plane revealed the pilots said the Islamic Istighfar (forgiveness prayer) and recited the Shahada before impact with the ground.

The collision took place about 100 kilometres (60 mi) west of Delhi. The wreckage of the Saudi Arabian aircraft landed near Dhani village, Bhiwani district, Haryana. The wreckage of the Kazakh aircraft hit the ground near Birohar village, Rohtak district, Haryana.

== Investigation and final report ==
The crash was investigated by the Lahoti Commission, headed by then-Delhi High Court judge Ramesh Chandra Lahoti. Depositions were taken from the Air Traffic Controllers Guild and the two airlines. The flight data recorders (FDR) were decoded by Kazakhstan Airlines and Saudia under the supervision of air crash investigators in Moscow and Farnborough, England, respectively. The ultimate cause was held to be the failure of Flight 1907's pilots to follow ATC instructions, whether due to cloud turbulence or due to communication problems.

The commission determined that the accident had been the fault of the Il-76 crew, who (according to FDR evidence) had descended from the assigned altitude of 15,000 to 14,500 feet (4,550 to 4,400 m) and subsequently 14,000 feet (4,250 m) and even lower. The report ascribed the cause of this serious breach in operating procedure to the lack of English language skills on the part of the Kazakhstani pilots; they were relying entirely on Radio Operator Repp for communications with the ATC. As part of this, the report suggested that First Officer Dzhangirov (and possibly Captain Cherepanov) might have misunderstood Dutta's final radio call and assumed that Saudia 763's altitude (14,000 feet) was their own assigned altitude. Indian air controllers also complained that Kazakhstani pilots sometimes misunderstood instructions involving altitude and distance; they were accustomed to measuring them in metres and kilometres respectively, while the Indian controllers used the International aviation standard of feet and nautical miles. Moreover, Repp, whose station lacked an altimeter, had to look over the pilots' shoulders to get an altitude reading. This may have limited his own situational awareness, and made the possibility of a misreading more likely.

Kazakh officials claimed – from the Il-76's misleading flight data records – that the aircraft had descended while their pilots were battling turbulence inside a bank of cumulus clouds. Meteorological reports, the affidavits of a Lockheed C-141B Starlifter crew that observed the crash, and conclusive analysis by the investigators – showing that the specific flight data record the Kazakh officials focused on proved only that the record was based on faulty recording equipment on the plane – disproved the Kazakh theory that turbulence was to blame.

Furthermore, the investigation team noted that the Indira Gandhi International Airport did not have secondary surveillance radar, which provides extra information, such as the aircraft's identity and altitude, by reading transponder signals; instead, the airport had primary radar, which produces readings of distance and bearing, but not altitude. In addition, departures and arrivals both shared a single corridor within the civilian airspace around New Delhi. While most areas have separate corridors – one for departures and another one for arrivals – the airspace of Delhi in 1996 had only one civilian corridor for both departures and arrivals because much of the airspace was taken by the Indian Air Force. Moreover, neither plane was equipped with a traffic collision avoidance system, which could have alerted both flights crews to the danger.

Due to the crash, the accident report recommended changes to air traffic procedures and infrastructure in New Delhi's airspace:

- Separation of inbound and outbound aircraft through the creation of 'air corridors'
- Installation of a secondary air-traffic control radar for aircraft altitude data
- Mandatory collision avoidance equipment on commercial aircraft operating in Indian airspace
- Reduction of the airspace over New Delhi that was formerly under exclusive control of the Indian Air Force

== Aftermath ==
The Directorate General of Civil Aviation subsequently made it mandatory for all aircraft flying in and out of India to be equipped with an airborne collision avoidance system. This set a worldwide precedent for mandatory use of traffic collision avoidance systems.

As of 2021, there is an ongoing effort by the Charkhi Dadri district administration to develop a memorial honoring the victims of the mid-air collision. The proposed memorial, which would consist of names and other information of the victims, would be located at a to-be-built memorial park in the district. However, the district administration is waiting to get an approval for the project from the Government of Haryana, and plans to include the participation of the Ministry of Civil Aviation of India, Airports Authority of India, and the embassies of Saudi Arabia and Kazakhstan in the development of the memorial.

== Documentaries ==
Miditech, a company based in Gurugram, Haryana, produced a documentary about the disaster called Head On!, which aired on the National Geographic Channel.

The collision was also the subject of the 2009 episode "Sight Unseen", of the Canadian-made, internationally distributed documentary series Mayday.

== See also ==
- List of accidents and incidents involving airliners by airline
