= Tahmid Air =

Airline of Kazakhstan

Tahmid Air Тахмид
IATA	ICAO	Call sign
—	THM	THAMID
- Founded: 2008
- Ceased operations: 2009
- Operating bases: Almaty International Airport
- Fleet size: 2
- Headquarters: Almaty, Kazakhstan
- Website: tahmid.kz

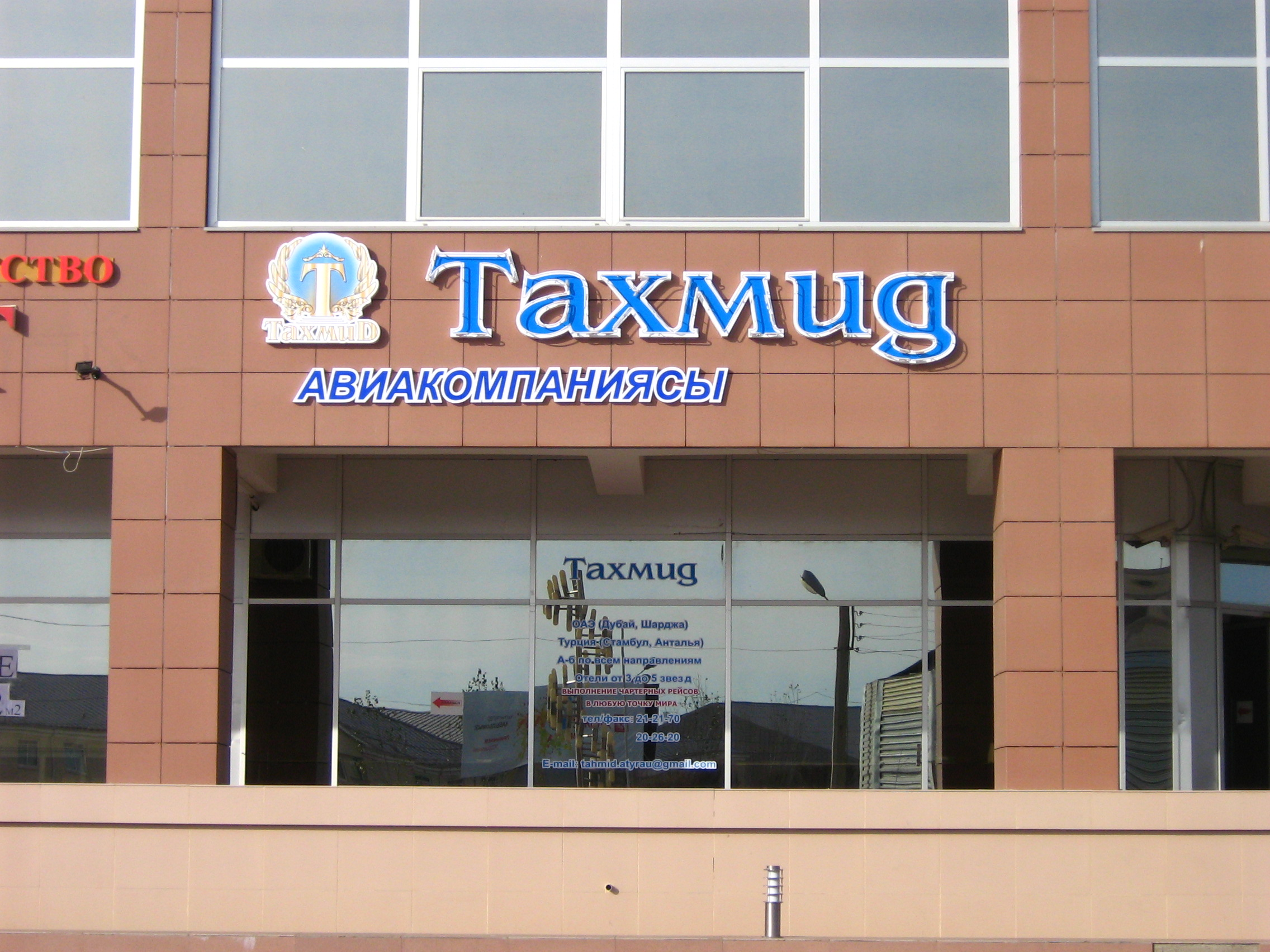
Tahmid Air's booking office in Atyrau, Kazakhstan (2008).

Tahmid Air (Russian: Компания "Тахмид") was a short-lived airline based in Almaty, Kazakhstan, which operated charter flights out of Almaty International Airport using a fleet of two Boeing 737-200 aircraft.

== History ==
Tahmid Air acquired its two aircraft in May and July 2008, marking the launch of the airline's business. On 1 April 2009, the airline license was withdrawn, shortly before the company appeared on the list of air carriers banned in the European Union. At that time, all commercial Kazakh airlines except Air Astana were included in this list because of the poor maintenance standards in the country.

== Gallery ==
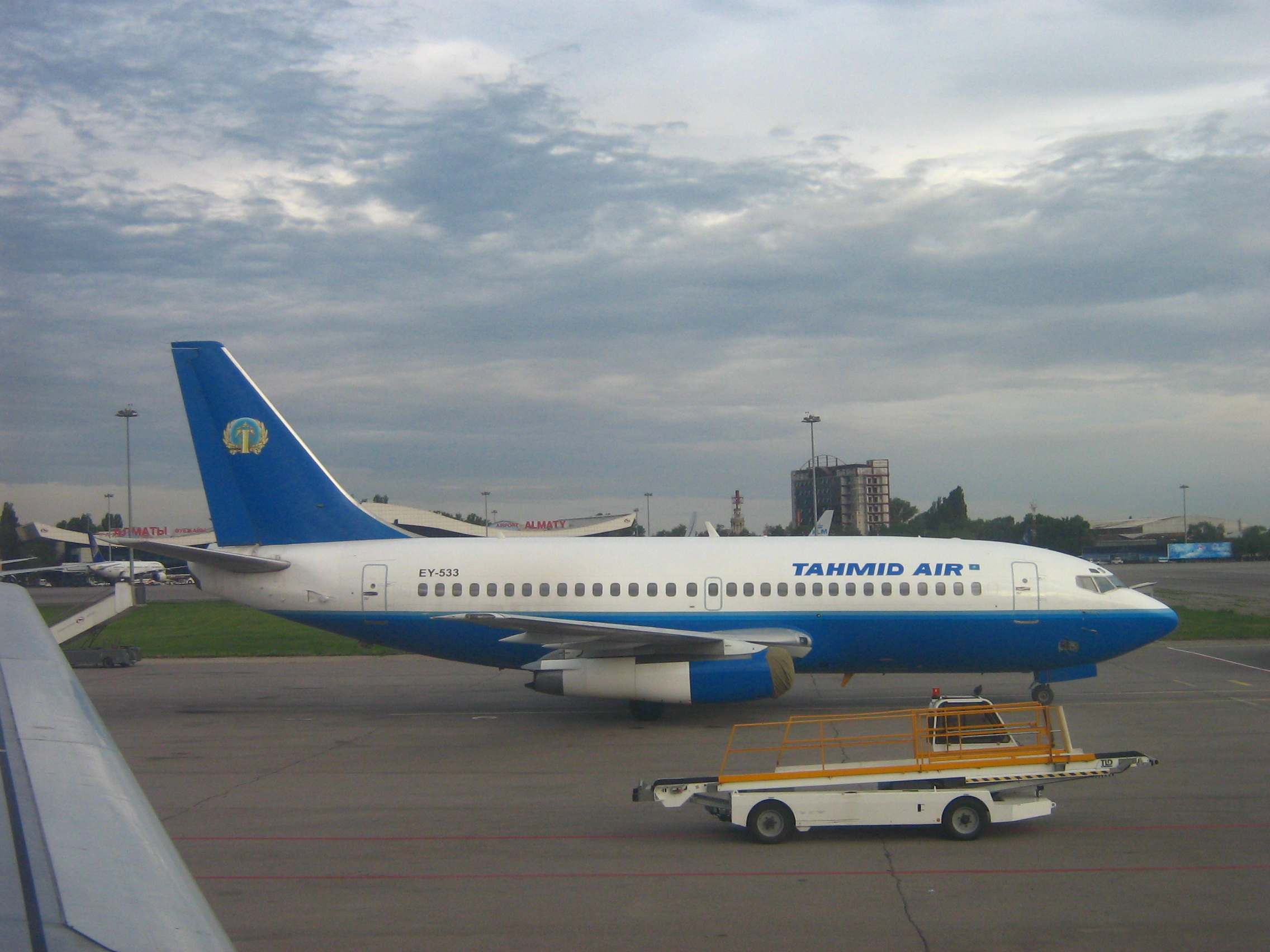
A Tahmid Air Boeing 737-200 at Almaty International Airport (2008).

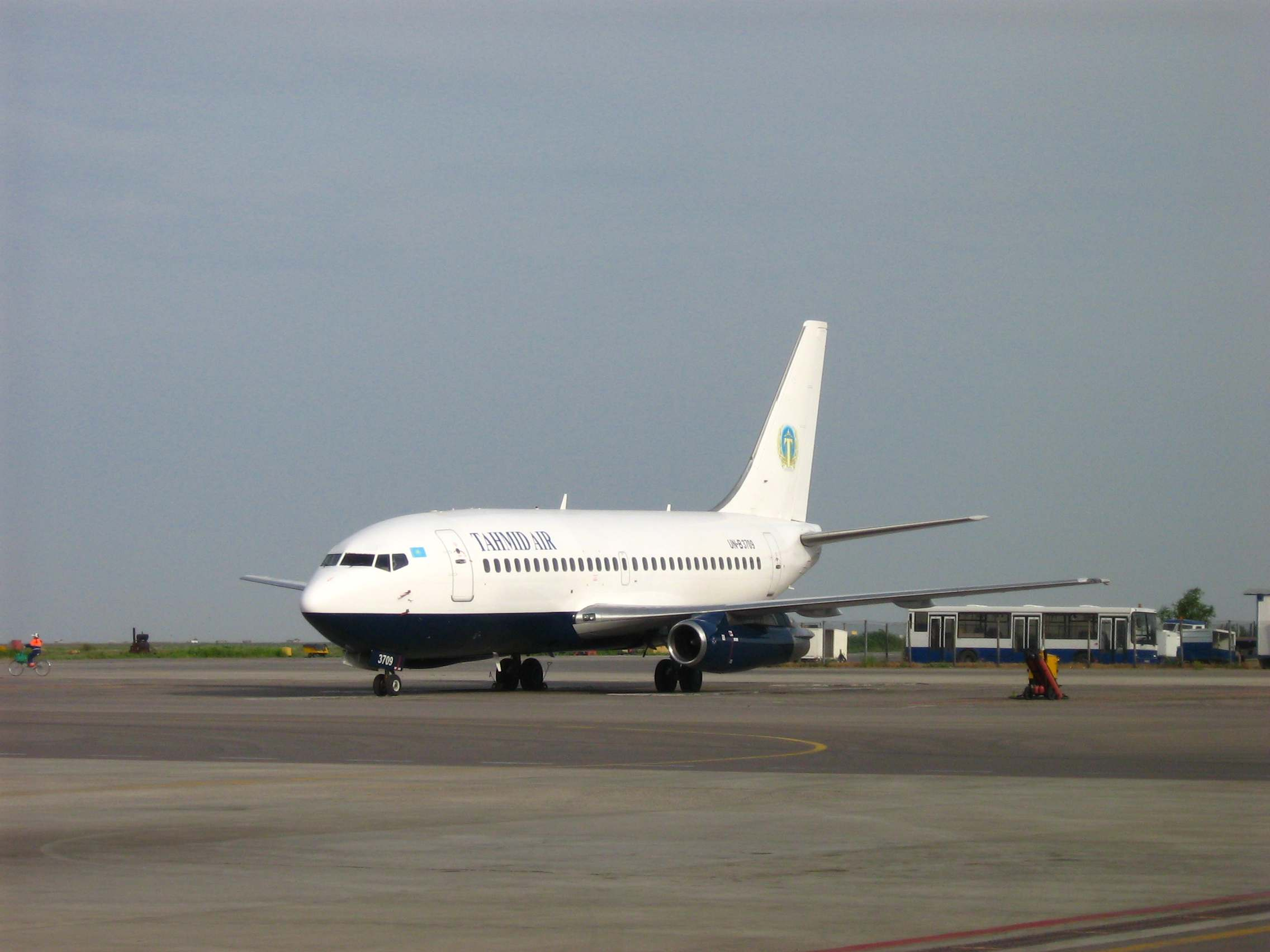
A Tahmid Air Boeing 737-200 at Atyrau Airport (2008).
