= Antonov An-50 =

Proposed airliner by Antonov

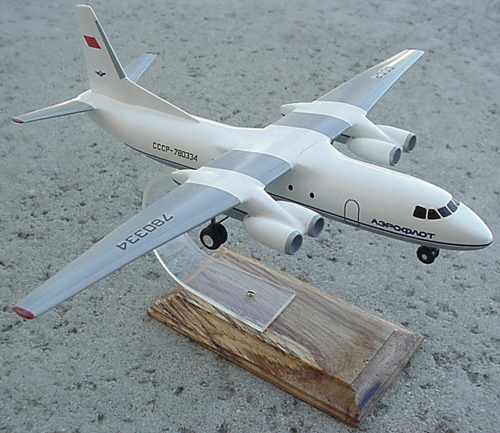
- An–50 plastic model

General information
- Type: Airliner
- National origin: Soviet Union
- Manufacturer: Antonov
- Status: Cancelled
- Number built: Not built

History
- Developed from: Antonov An-24

The Antonov An-50 was a planned Soviet airliner with four turbojets. It was planned by Antonov in the first part of the 1970s. The aircraft was never built.

Antonov made the plans based on the An-24R, but it would have had four turbojets with 14.7 kN thrust each, instead of the two turbojets used earlier. The turbojets were planned to be built together with the undercarriage, under the inner wings. There were no other major changes planned. The plans were complete in 1972, however no aircraft were built.

It was planned to weigh 24600 kg gross, and it would have had a 490 km/h speed at 9400 m altitude.
