= Asia Wings =

Kazakh airline

IATA	ICAO	Call sign
Y5	AWA	—
- Founded: 2010
- Commenced operations: 2010
- Ceased operations: 2012
- Hubs: Sary-Arka Airport, Almaty International Airport
- Fleet size: 3
- Destinations: 6
- Headquarters: Karaganda, Kazakhstan

Asia Wings was a Kazakh airline based in Karagandy, and operated 6 domestic services from Karaganda and Almaty. The airline ceased all operations in 2012.
