= Khozu Avia =

Private airline of Kazakhstan

- Commenced operations: 2002; 24 years ago
- Hubs: Almaty Airport
- Secondary hubs: Nur-Sultan Airport
- Fleet size: 1
- Headquarters: Almaty, Kazakhstan

Khozu Avia is a private airline established in 2002 and based in Almaty, Kazakhstan operating charter and business flights from its bases of Almaty Airport and Nur-Sultan Airport.

== Fleet ==
=== Current fleet ===
The Khozu Avia fleet includes the following aircraft (as of August 2018):

Khozu Avia fleet
Aircraft	In fleet	Orders	Passengers	Notes
Bombardier Challenger 850	1	0		

=== Former fleet ===
Khozu Avia formerly operated:

Khozu Avia retired fleet
Aircraft	Formerly operated
Bombardier Challenger 850	1
Yakovlev Yak-42	2 (Note: Registered UP-42641 and UP-42323)
