= Euro-Asia Air =

Airline of Kazakhstan

IATA	ICAO	Call sign
5B	EAK	EAKAZ
- Commenced operations: May 1997; 29 years ago November 2000; 25 years ago Atyrau Airways and Atyrau Airport added
- Hubs: Atyrau Airport
- Fleet size: 19
- Parent company: KazMunayGas
- Headquarters: Atyrau, Kazakhstan
- Website: eaa.kz

Euro-Asia Air is an airline based in Atyrau, Kazakhstan. It operates mainly charter passenger services to Russia, United Arab Emirates, Turkey and within the Asian republics. Its main base is Atyrau Airport.

== History ==
The airline started operations in May 1997. In November 2000, Atyrau Airways and Atyrau Airport were transferred to the ownership of Euro-Asia Air. The airline is now wholly owned by KazMunayGas and has 412 employees (at March 2017).

The main activities of the company are rendering services for air transportation to legal entities and individuals. Performing flights for the development and development of mineral deposits, servicing oil pipelines, gas pipelines and power lines "Euro-Asia Air" is the largest airline in Kazakhstan, specializing in helicopter operations and passenger transportation. Operating in accordance with international safety standards. The company operates a fleet of helicopter equipment of Russian and Western production and a fleet of passenger aircraft equipped with modern on-board equipment. The aircraft fleet consists of 19 aircraft, including: 11 Mi-8T helicopters (RF); 2 helicopters of model AS-365N3 (France); 2 Challenger-850 and Challenger-870 aircraft (Canada); 4 helicopters model Augusta Westland-139 (Italy).

== Fleet ==
=== Current fleet ===
The Euro-Asia Air fleet includes the following aircraft (as of August 2019):

Euro-Asia Air fleet
Aircraft	In fleet	Orders	Passengers	Notes
Bombardier CRJ700	1	0	70	

=== Former fleet ===
The airline fleet included the following aircraft as of November 2012:

Former Euro-Asia Air fleet
Aircraft	In fleet	Orders	Passengers	Notes
Bombardier CRJ700	1	0	70	
Bombardier Challenger 850	1	0	TBA	
AgustaWestland AW139	4	0	12	
Mil Mi-8	11	0	TBA	
Eurocopter AS365	2	0	TBA	
