= Berkut Air =

Airline of Kazakhstan

IATA	ICAO	Call sign
-	BEC	BERKUT
- Founded: 1999
- Ceased operations: 2011
- Operating bases: Nursultan Nazarbayev International Airport
- Fleet size: 3
- Headquarters: Astana, Kazakhstan

State Air Company Berkut, commonly known as Berkut Air, was an airline based in Astana, Kazakhstan, operated Government charter flights out of Nursultan Nazarbayev International Airport.

== History ==
Berkut Air was founded in 1999. Except all other commercial Kazakh airlines, it was not banned from entering EU airspace in April 2009, due to the high standards of technical maintenance.

== Fleet ==
=== Current fleet ===
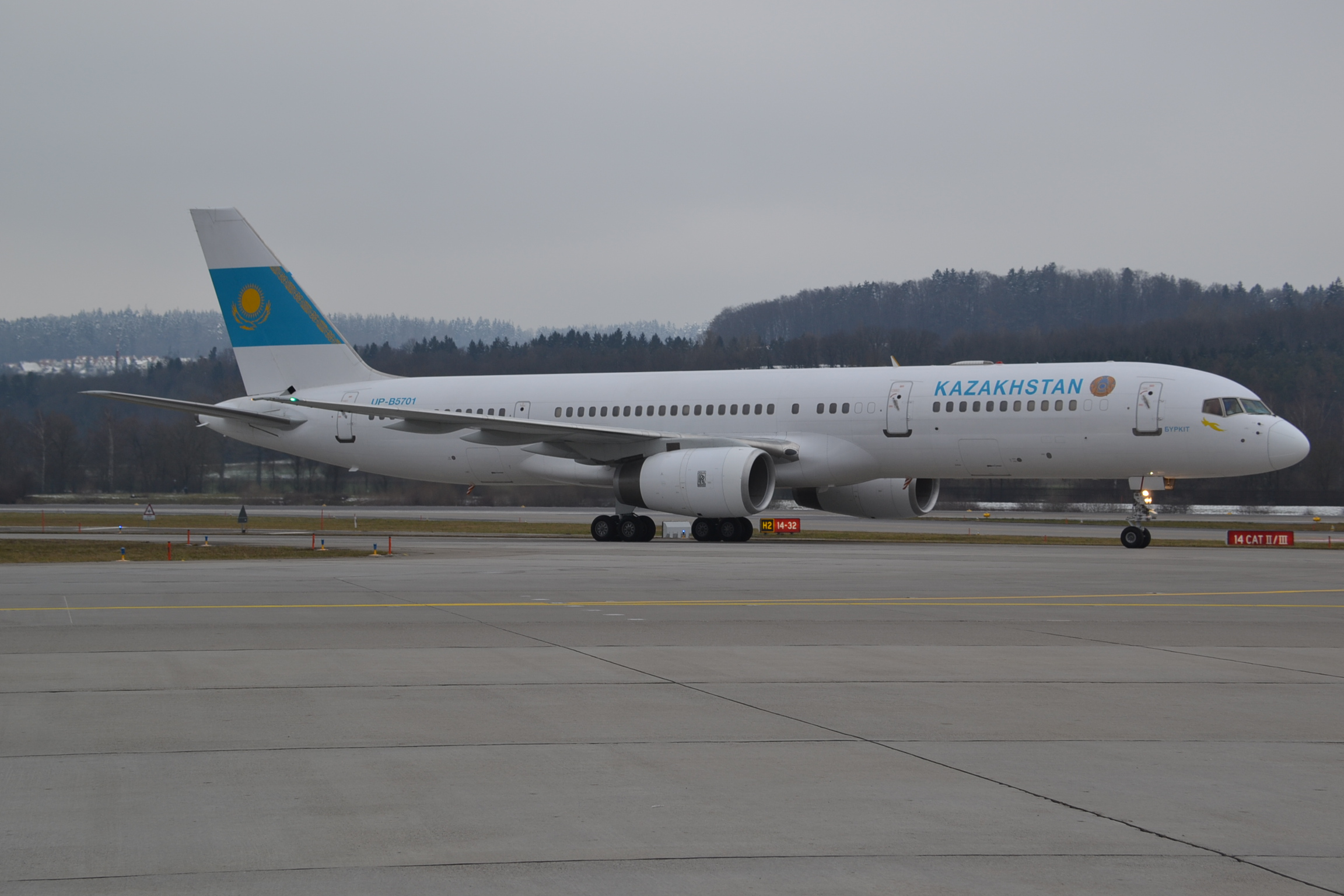
Boeing 757-200 of Berkut Air operated by the Government of Kazakhstan

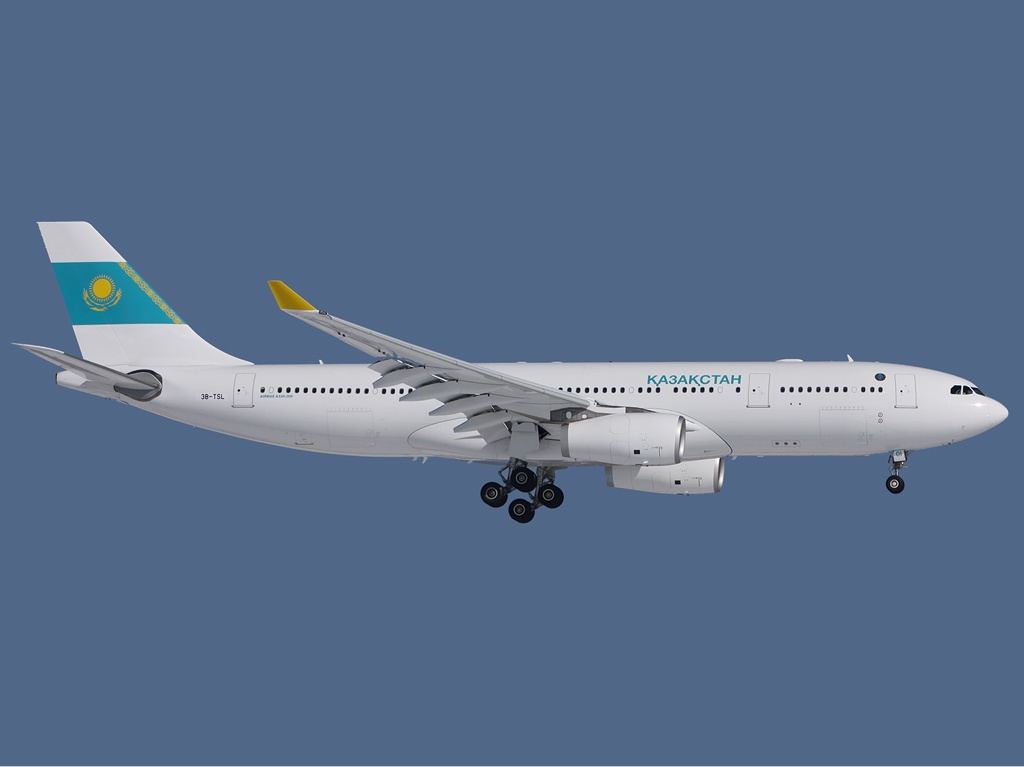
Kazakhstan Government Airbus A330-200

As of July 2026, Berkut Air operates the following aircraft:

Berkut Air fleet
Aircraft	In Service	Orders	Passengers	Notes
Boeing 757-200	1	—		
Ilyushin Il-76TD	1	—		
Tupolev Tu-134SH	1	—		
Total	3			

=== Former fleet ===
As of August 2025, Berkut Air operated 1 Boeing 757-200, 1 Ilyushin Il76 and 1 Tupolev Tu-134.

The airline also previously operated the following aircraft:

- 1 Airbus A320
- 1 Antonov An-12, UP-AN205, Cargo
- 1 Fokker 100, UP-F1004, Charter
- 1 Yakovlev Yak-40, UP-Y4023, Charter
- 1 Tupolev Tu-154M, UN-85713, Charter
- 1 Tupolev Tu-134AK
- 1 Boeing 747-200, 9G-MKS, Cargo
- 1 Bombardier Challenger 850
