= Sky Service (Kazakhstan) =

Kazakh charter airline

IATA	ICAO	Call sign
—	KVR	KAVAIR
- Founded: 2004; 22 years ago
- Hubs: Boraldai Airport
- Fleet size: 17
- Destinations: n/a
- Headquarters: Head office: Almaty, Kazakhstan
- Website: http://www.sky-service.com.kz/index.php

Sky Service is a charter airline, which operates several helicopters and smaller aircraft. The airline offers passenger transportation services, mostly sight-seeing flights, in the Almaty region.

== Fleet ==
The Sky Service fleet includes the following aircraft, as of May 2014;

Sky Service fleet
Aircraft	In fleet	Orders	Passengers	Notes
AS 350	1	0	4	UP-AS001
EC130	2	0	5	UP-EC008, UP-EC016
EC135	1	0	6	UP-EC506
Bell 206	5	0	4	UP-BL005, UP-BL009, UP-BL010, UP-BL012, UP-BL013
Cessna 208 Caravan	2	0	12	UP-CS102, UP-CS103
