= Air Kazakhstan =

Flag carrier of Kazakhstan from 1991 to 2004

IATA	ICAO	Call sign
9Y	KZK	AIR KAZAKHSTAN
- Founded: 1991 (as Kazakhstan Airways)
- Commenced operations: 1991
- Ceased operations: 29 February 2004
- Hubs: Almaty International Airport
- Destinations: 21
- Headquarters: Almaty, Kazakhstan
- Website: https://airkazakstan.com

Air Kazakhstan, stylised as Air Kazakstan (Kazakh: Эйр Қазақстан / Eir Qazaqstan), was a Kazakh airline and its national carrier. After its bankruptcy, the airline was shut down. It was headquartered in Almaty.

== History ==
The airline was established in 1991 as Kazakhstan Airways, but changed to Air Kazakhstan on 10 March 1997 (spelled as "Air Kazakhstan" until 2001). It ceased operations on 29 February 2004, after accumulating heavy debts, and was declared bankrupt in April 2004 by a court in Almaty.

Air Astana succeeded and replaced Air Kazakhstan as the country's flag carrier.

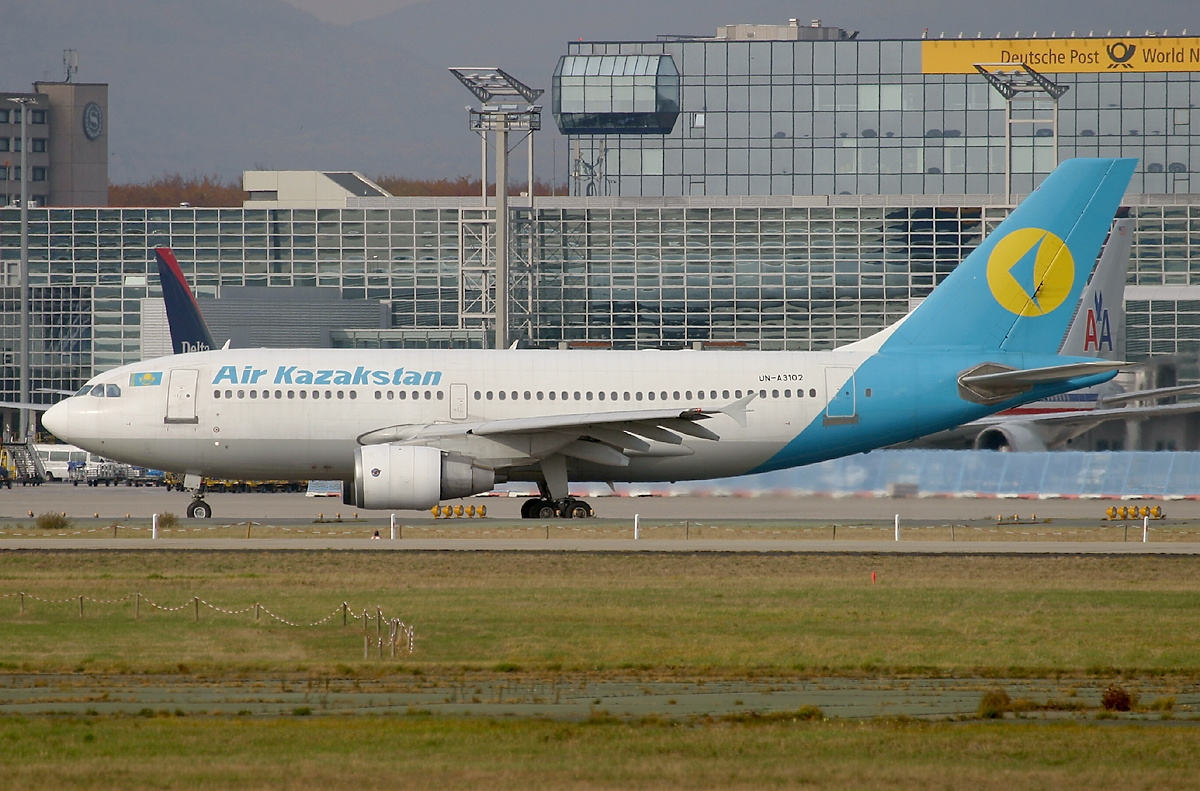
An Airbus A310-300 of Air Kazakhstan at 2 November 2003.
