= AiRUnion =

Russian airline alliance

- Launch date: 2005
- Full members: 5
- Destination airports: 134
- Destination countries: 13
- Annual passengers (M): 4
- Fleet size: 100
- Management: Boris Abramovich (CEO); Alexander Abramovich (President)
- Website: airunion.ru

AiRUnion was a Russian airline alliance. It was the first airline alliance ever established in Russia. Member airlines and their affiliates enjoyed a high degree of co-operation in scheduling, ticketing, code sharing, flight transfer operations, frequent flyer program benefits, shared airport lounges, reducing costs, and sharing best practices. The airline and member carriers have since gone bankrupt in 2008. With government sponsorship, the alliance was planned to be resurrected as Rossiya as of 2008. However, this never took place.

== History ==
This alliance was established as AirBridge. In October 2004 Russian airlines KrasAir and Domodedovo Airlines set up a joint management company called AirBridge. KrasAir is owned by the city government of Krasnoyarsk (51%) and AirBridge management (49%) (Boris Abramovich - CEO and his brother, Alexander Abramovich - deputy CEO, no relation to Roman Abramovich). While retaining separate legal identities the airlines were planning to integrate their networks and services, as they are largely complementary. In April 2007 AirBridge had purchased Malév airline from Hungarian government. Boris Abramovich is also a CEO of AirUnion alliance.

The Abramovich brothers' aggressive expansion campaign led to the creation of AiRUnion alliance in 2005, the first airline alliance in Russia. It included KrasAir, Domodedovo Airlines, Omskavia, Samara Airlines and Sibaviatrans. On May 3, 2007 the five members of the AirUnion alliance were rolled into a similarly named holding company, OAO AirUnion, in which the Russian government holds no less than 45% of the shares.

Although Malév was a Oneworld member, in early 2007 AiRUnion began a codeshare with Austrian Airlines and Lufthansa in its strategic expansion into European routes.

AiRUnion was competing with S7 Airlines to become the second largest domestic carrier in Russia in 2007, after Aeroflot. AiRUnion carried 4.9 million passengers in 2006 compared to 8.75 million for Aeroflot.

== Member airlines ==
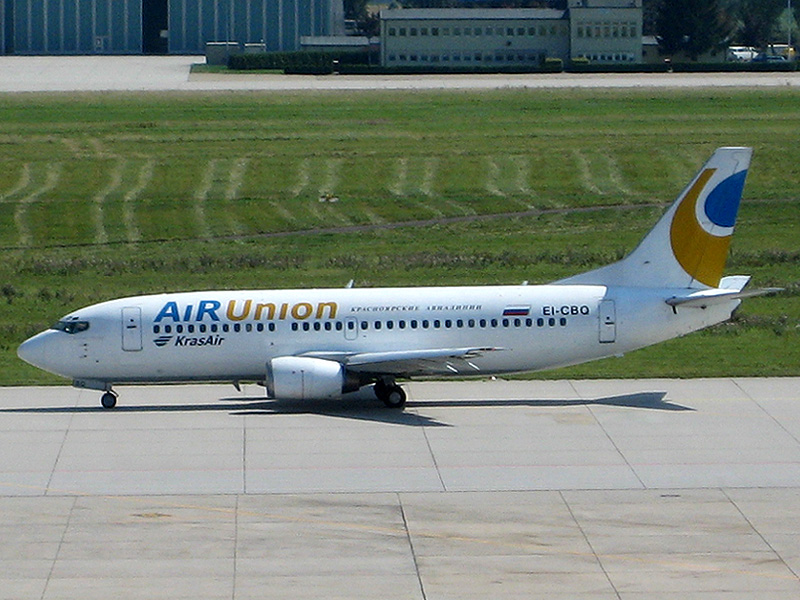
EI-CBQ Boeing 737

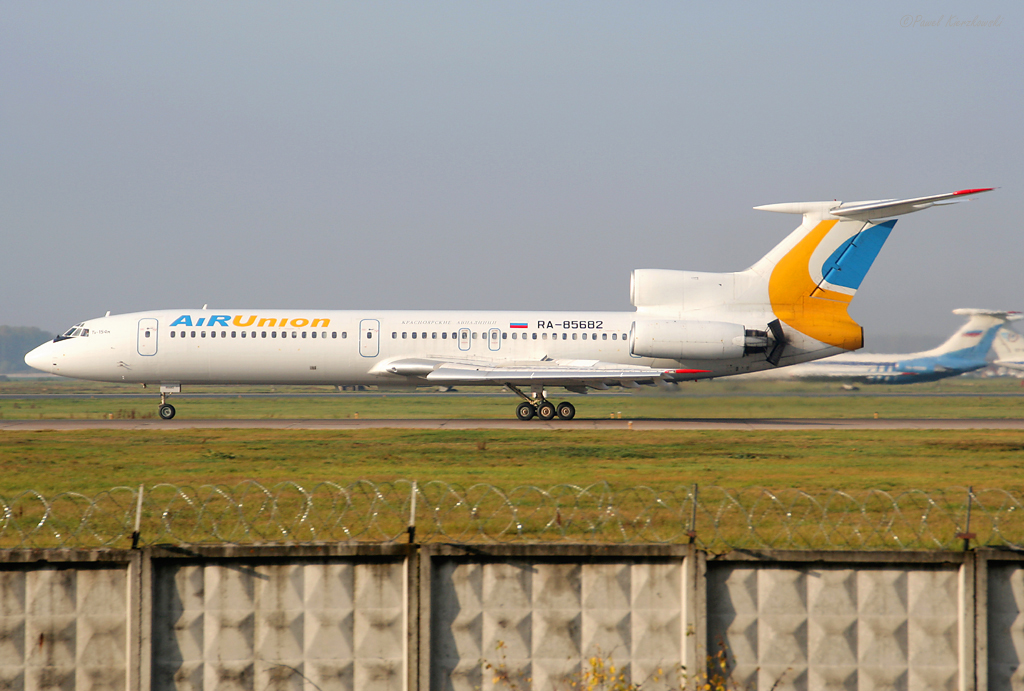
KrasAir Tupolev Tu-154M in AiRUnion colors

Airline
(Russia) Domodedovo Airlines
(Russia) KrasAir
(Russia) Omskavia
(Russia) Samara Airlines
(Russia) Sibaviatrans

== Premium status ==
AiRUnion had one premium level, Premium, based on a customer's tier status in a frequent flyer program. Each member and regional airline recognized AiRUnion Premium status, with only a few exceptions, mainly pertaining to airport lounge access. Status has no specific requirements; membership is based solely on the frequent flyer programs of individual member airlines. Benefits of AiRUnion Premium membership included free tickets, transportation of additional luggage and discounts of alliance program participants.

== Destinations ==
=== Russia ===
- Abakan
- Barnaul (Barnaul Airport)
- Baykit (Baykit Airport)
- Belgorod (Belgorod Airport)
- Blagoveshchensk (Ignatyevo Airport)
- Bodaybo
- Bratsk (Bratsk Airport)
- Chita (Kadala Airport)
- Chelyabinsk (Chelyabinsk Balandino Airport)
- Igarka (Igarka Airport)
- Irkutsk (Irkutsk International Airport)
- Kazan (Kazan Airport)
- Kemerovo (Kemerovo Airport)
- Khabarovsk (Khabarovsk Novy Airport)
- Komsomolsk-na-Amure
- Krasnodar (Pashkovsky Airport)
- Krasnoyarsk (Krasnoyarsk Yemelyanovo Airport)
- Mineralnye Vody (Mineralnye Vody Airport)
- Motygino
- Moscow (Domodedovo International Airport)
- Norilsk (Norilsk Alykel Airport)
- Nizhnevartovsk (Nizhnevartovsk Airport)
- Nizhny Novgorod (Nizhny Novgorod Strigino Airport)
- Novosibirsk (Novosibirsk Tolmachevo Airport)
- Novy Urengoy (Novy Urengoy)
- Omsk (Tsentralny Airport)
- Petropavlovsk-Kamchatsky (Petropavlovsk-Kamchatsky Airport)
- Bor (Podkamennaya Tunguska Airport)
- Rostov-on-Don (Rostov-on-Don Airport)
- Samara (Samara Kurumoch Airport)
- Severo-Yeniseysk
- Sochi (Adler-Sochi International Airport)
- Saint Petersburg (Pulkovo Airport)
- Surgut (Surgut Airport)
- Tomsk (Bogashevo Airport)
- Tura (Tura Airport)
- Turukhansk (Turukhansk Airport)
- Ulan-Ude (Ulan-Ude Airport)
- Ufa (Ufa Airport)
- Vladivostok (Vladivostok International Airport)
- Voronezh (Chertovitskoye Airport)
- Yakutsk (Yakutsk Airport)
- Yekaterinburg (Koltsovo International Airport)
- Yuzhno-Sakhalinsk (Yuzhno-Sakhalinsk Airport)

=== Asia ===
==== Central Asia ====
- Kazakhstan
  - Almaty (Almaty International Airport)
  - Karaganda
  - Kostanai
  - Shymkent
- Kyrgyzstan
  - Bishkek (Manas International Airport)
- Tajikistan
  - Dushanbe (Dushanbe Airport)
  - Khujand
- Uzbekistan
  - Bukhara (Bukhara Airport)
  - Samarkand
  - Tashkent (Yuzhny Airport)

==== East Asia ====
- China, People's Republic of
  - Beijing (Beijing Capital International Airport)
  - Tianjin (Tianjin Binhai International Airport)

==== Southeast Asia ====
- Thailand
  - Bangkok

==== Southwest Asia ====
- Armenia
  - Yerevan (Zvartnots International Airport)
- Azerbaijan
  - Baku (Heydar Aliyev International Airport)
  - Ganja
  - Nakhichevan City

=== Europe ===
- Germany
  - Cologne (Cologne Bonn Airport)
  - Frankfurt am Main (Frankfurt International Airport)
  - Hannover (Hanover/Langenhagen International Airport)
  - Stuttgart (Stuttgart Airport)
- Portugal
  - Lisbon (Portela Airport)
- Ukraine
  - Kyiv (Boryspil Airport)
