= Sibaviatrans =

Airline based in Krasnoyarsk, Russia

IATA	ICAO	Call sign
5M	SIB	Sibavia
- Founded: 23 February 1995
- Ceased operations: 2008
- Hubs: Yemelyanovo Airport
- Fleet size: 16
- Headquarters: Krasnoyarsk, Russia
- Website: http://www.siat.ru/

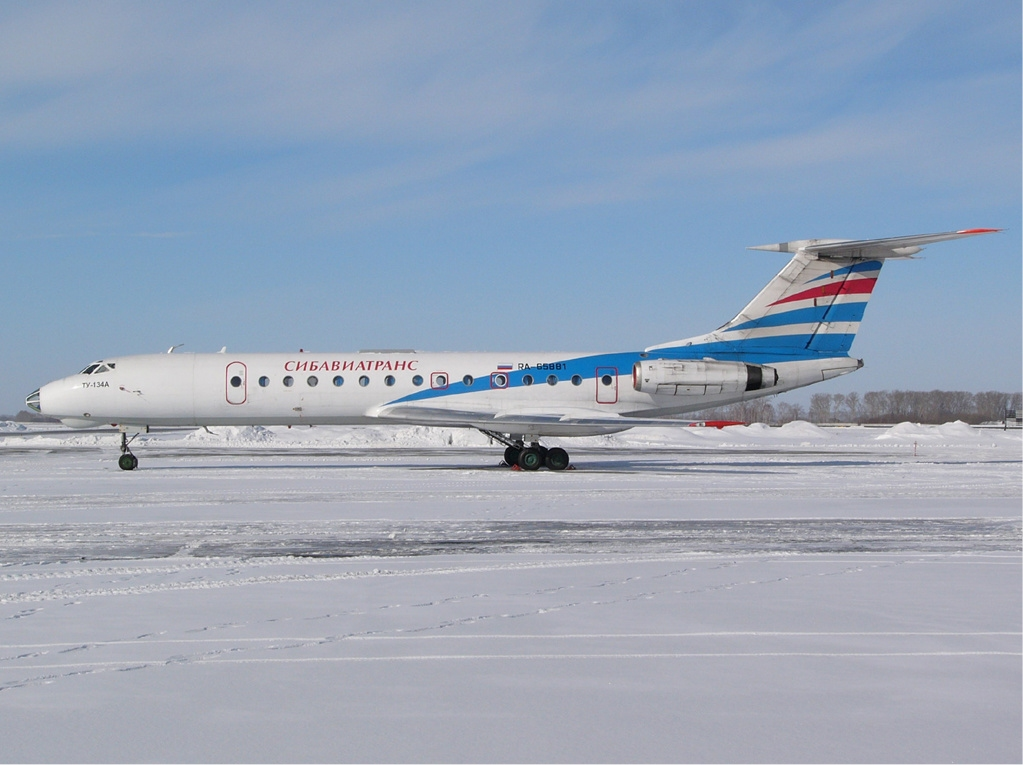
Sibaviatrans Tupolev Tu-134, Tolmachevo, 2007

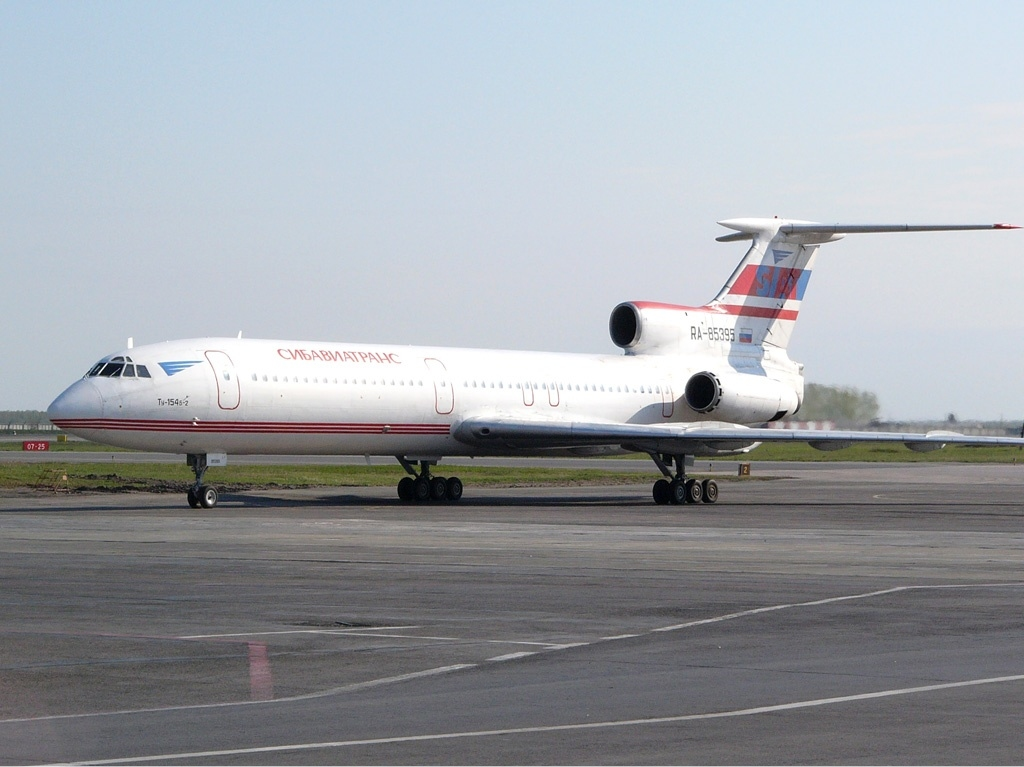
Sibaviatrans Tupolev Tu-154, Tolmachevo, 2005

Sibaviatrans (Joint Stock Company SIAT) was an airline based in Krasnoyarsk, Russia. It operated scheduled and charter passenger and cargo flights from various locations around Russia. It also provided helicopter services. It was a member of AiRUnion alliance.

== History ==
The airline was established and started operations on 23 February 1995. It employed 557 staff.

It suspended operations at the end of September 2008 due to the AiRUnion collapse.

== Destinations ==
Sibaviatrans operated services to the following domestic scheduled destinations (at September 2008):

- Abakan (Abakan International Airport)
- Barnaul (Barnaul Airport)
- Baykit (Baykit Airport)
- Belgorod (Belgorod International Airport)
- Bodaybo (Bodaybo Airport)
- Bratsk (Bratsk Airport)
- Chelyabinsk (Chelyabinsk Balandino Airport)
- Dikson (Dikson Airport)
- Igarka (Igarka Airport)
- Irkutsk (Irkutsk Airport)
- Kazan (Kazan International Airport)
- Kemerovo (Kemerovo International Airport)
- Krasnodar (Krasnodar International Airport)
- Krasnoyarsk (Yemelyanovo Airport) hub
- Motygino
- Norilsk (Alykel Airport) main hub
- Nizhnevartovsk (Nizhnevartovsk Airport)
- Nizhny Novgorod (Nizhny Novgorod International Airport)
- Novosibirsk (Tolmachevo Airport)
- Novy Urengoy (Novy Urengoy)
- Omsk (Tsentralny Airport)
- Bor (Podkamennaya Tunguska Airport)
- Severo-Yeniseysk (Severo-Eniseysk Airport)
- Surgut (Surgut Airport)
- Tura (Tura Airport)
- Turukhansk (Turukhansk Airport)
- Ufa (Ufa International Airport)
- Ulan-Ude (Ulan-Ude Airport)
- Voronezh (Voronezh International Airport)
- Yekaterinburg (Koltsovo Airport)

== Fleet ==
The Sibaviatrans fleet included the following aircraft (as of September 2008):

Aircraft	#	Seats	Notes
Antonov An-24	8	48	
Antonov An-32	1	48	
Tupolev Tu-154B-2	1	150-168	
Tupolev Tu-134	4	76	
Yakovlev Yak-40	2	32-34	
