= KrasAir =

Russian airline

KrasAir Красноярские авиалинии
IATA	ICAO	Call sign
7B	KJC	KRASNOYARSK AIR
- Founded: 1993
- Ceased operations: 2008
- Hubs: Krasnoyarsk-Krasnoyarsk Yemelyanovo Airport
- Secondary hubs: Moscow-Domodedovo International Airport
- Frequent-flyer program: AiRUnion Premium, AkademStar Premium (for students)
- Alliance: AiRUnion
- Fleet size: 36
- Destinations: 57
- Headquarters: Krasnoyarsk, Russia
- Key people: Boris Abramovich (CEO), Alexander Misharin (Chairman of the Board)
- Website: krasair.ru

KrasAir or Krasnoyarsk Airlines (Russian: Красноярские авиалинии) was a Russian airline with its head office on the grounds of Krasnoyarsk Yemelyanovo Airport in Krasnoyarsk. It operated scheduled regional and international passenger services, freight transport, cargo handling and charter services from the main base is Krasnoyarsk Yemelyanovo Airport, as part of AiRUnion alliance. In 2008 Krasair suffered a liquidity crisis, and after a string of operational shutdowns, administrative and strikes, the company ceased operations in October 2008.

== History ==
=== Privatization ===
The company traces its roots to the Krasnoyarsk-based Yenisey air wing, established by the Chief Directorate of the Northern Sea Route in May, 1934. The air wing eventually differentiated into traditional airline operations, and was as Krasnoyarsk Civil Aviation Directorate (1946–1982) and Krasnoyarsk Aviation Enterprize (1982–1993). In 1993 it was privatized with the state retaining 51% controlling share.

=== AiRUnion ===
KrasAir was managed by Boris Abramovich (CEO, no relation to Roman Abramovich) and his brother Alexander Abramovich (deputy CEO). The Abramovich brothers' aggressive expansion campaign led to the creation of AiRUnion alliance in 2005, the first airline alliance in Russia. It includes KrasAir, Domodedovo Airlines, Samara Airlines, Omskavia and Sibaviatrans and was the third largest domestic carrier in Russia. All of the member airlines were controlled by Krasair management.

In 2005 KrasAir attempted to expand internationally, placing a winning bid in Hungary's national carrier Malév privatisation tender. The tender results were initially annulled by Hungarian authorities before finally being sold in February 2007. During 2006 1,118,543 passengers were transported by KrasAir and AiRUnion transported 3,342,815 passengers

KrasAir managers were part of a venture together with the European Bank of Reconstruction and Development to create a new low-cost airline called Sky Express. This airline was to be based at Vnukovo Airport and fly initially to domestic routes, using as many as 44 Boeing 737-300/500s. The airline's airfares were to be 30-40% cheaper than other carriers.

=== 2008 crisis ===
In June and August 2008 Krasair and AiRUnion fleets were grounded as the fuel suppliers denied further credit fuel to debt-ridden airlines. In June, Krasair and its principal supplier, Krasnoyarsk-based Sibir Avia Service, reached an agreement to resume fuel supply on condition that Krasair debt did not exceed 100 million roubles. By the middle of August the debt rose to 223 million roubles, and on August 19 Sibir Avia stopped refuelling, leaving thousands of passengers stranded in airports. Krasair blamed the crisis on rising oil prices. In first six months of 2008, fuel accounted for 54% of Krasair costs. Flights were also grounded in Moscow and Omsk airports.

Analysts predicted that the fuel crisis would be resolved through intervention of Rostechhologii, a newly formed state conglomerate that controls substantial shares of AiRUnion companies, including Krasair; alternatively, the state may prefer to complete formal bankruptcy process and restructure AiRUnion assets under a new management. On August 24, Prime Minister Vladimir Putin specifically addressed the problem of the grounded airline, authorizing Sergey Ivanov to issue state funds and enable further operations.

On August 26, media reports appeared to indicate that bankruptcy was inevitable. Russian Technologies, the principal shareholder, refused to pay AiRUnion's bills and its fleet remained grounded. The same day, the Russian Ministry of Transportation negotiated with Aeroflot, Transaero, S7 Airlines and Rossiya about taking over the routes previously operated by Krasair.

On October 27, Krasair was unable to fly most of their aircraft due to a pilots' strike as a refusal by refuelling companies to extend credit to the airline. It was announced that Krasair would cease to exist on November 1, 2008.

== Destinations ==
Destinations as of August 2008
Country	City	Airport	Notes
Russia
Russia	Barnaul	Barnaul Airport	
	Blagoveshchensk	Ignatyevo Airport	
	Chita	Kadala Airport	
	Igarka	Igarka Airport	
	Irkutsk	Irkutsk Airport	
	Kemerovo	Kemerovo International Airport	
	Khabarovsk	Khabarovsk Novy Airport	
	Khatanga	Khatanga Airport	
	Komsomolsk-on-Amur	Komsomolsk-on-Amur Airport	
	Krasnodar	Krasnodar International Airport	
	Krasnoyarsk	Yemelyanovo Airport	Hub
	Kyzyl	Kyzyl Airport	
	Mineralnye Vody	Mineralnye Vody Airport	
	Moscow	Domodedovo International Airport	Hub
	Norilsk	Alykel Airport	
	Novosibirsk	Tolmachevo Airport	
	Omsk	Tsentralny Airport	
	Petropavlovsk-Kamchatsky	Petropavlovsk-Kamchatsky Airport	
	Rostov-on-Don	Rostov-on-Don Airport	
	Saint Petersburg	Pulkovo Airport	
	Samara	Kurumoch International Airport	
	Sochi	Sochi International Airport	
	Tomsk	Bogashevo Airport	
	Tura	Tura Airport	
	Ulan-Ude	Ulan-Ude Airport	
	Vladivostok	Vladivostok International Airport	
	Yakutsk	Yakutsk Airport	
	Yekaterinburg	Koltsovo International Airport	
	Yeniseysk	Yeniseysk Airport	
	Yuzhno-Sakhalinsk	Yuzhno-Sakhalinsk Airport	
Asia
Armenia	Yerevan	Zvartnots International Airport	
Azerbaijan	Baku	Heydar Aliyev International Airport	
China	Beijing	Beijing Capital International Airport	
Kazakhstan	Almaty	Almaty International Airport	
	Baikonur	Baikonur Krayniy Airport	
Kyrgyzstan	Bishkek	Manas International Airport	
Tajikistan	Dushanbe	Dushanbe Airport	
	Khujand	Khudzhand Airport	
Thailand	Bangkok	Suvarnabhumi Airport	
	Pattaya	U-Tapao International Airport	
United Arab Emirates	Dubai	Dubai International Airport	
Uzbekistan	Tashkent	Tashkent International Airport	
Europe
Austria	Salzburg	Salzburg Airport	
Germany	Frankfurt	Frankfurt Airport	
	Hannover	Hanover/Langenhagen International Airport	
Greece	Athens	Eleftherios Venizelos International Airport	
	Heraklion	Heraklion International Airport, "Nikos Kazantzakis" Seasonal	
	Thessaloniki	Thessaloniki International Airport	
Montenegro	Tivat	Tivat Airport	
Portugal	Lisbon	Portela Airport	

== Fleet ==
Throughout their history, KrasAir operated the following types of aircraft:

KrasAir fleet
Aircraft	Photo	Total
Antonov An-2		20
Antonov An-24		3
Antonov An-26		8
Boeing 737-300		6
Boeing 757-200		4
Boeing 767-200ER		5
Evektor EV-55 Outback		29 orders
Ilyushin Il-62		22
Ilyushin Il-76		16
Ilyushin Il-86		10
Ilyushin Il-96-300		5
McDonnell Douglas DC-10-30		2
Tupolev Tu-134		11
Tupolev Tu-154		42
Tupolev Tu-204		6
Tupolev Tu-214		1
Yakovlev Yak-40		13
Yakovlev Yak-42		5
