= Podkamennaya Tunguska (disambiguation) =

Podkamennaya Tunguska may refer to:

- Podkamennaya Tunguska ("Stony Tunguska", also: "Middle Tunguska"), tributary of the Yenisey in Krasnoyarsk Krai, Russia
- Podkamennaya Tunguska (rural locality), a rural locality (a village) in Krasnoyarsk Krai, Russia
- Podkamennaya Tunguska Airport, Krasnoyarsk Krai, Russia
