= Domodedovo =

Domodedovo may refer to:

- Domodedovo International Airport, an airport in Russia
- Domodedovo (town), a town in Moscow Oblast, Russia
- Domodedovo District, an administrative raion of Moscow Oblast, Russia
- Domodedovo Airlines, a defunct Russian airline
- Domodedovo Moscow, an association football club
