= Domodedovo Airlines =

Russian airline (1992–2008)

Domodedovo Airlines Домодедовские авиалинии
IATA	ICAO	Call sign
E3	DMO	DOMODEDOVO
- Founded: 1964 (as Aeroflot); 1992
- Ceased operations: 2008
- Hubs: Moscow-Domodedovo
- Frequent-flyer program: AiRUnion PREMIUM, AkademStar Premium (for students
- Alliance: AiRUnion
- Fleet size: 13
- Destinations: 19
- Headquarters: Domodedovo International Airport; Domodedovsky District, Moscow Oblast, Russia
- Key people: Sergey Borisovich Yanovoi (General Director)
- Website: akdal.ru/eng/live/default.asp

JSC Domodedovo Airlines (Russian: ОАО «Авиакомпания «Домодедовские авиалинии» OAO Aviakompaniya Domodedovskiye Avialinii) was an airline with its head office on the grounds of Domodedovo International Airport in Domodedovsky District, Moscow Oblast, Russia. It operated scheduled flights within Russia and the CIS, with a focus on flights to the Russian Far East. The airline also operated scheduled and ad hoc charter flights to P. R. China, Europe, Thailand, Maldives, Malaysia and Singapore.

== Destinations ==
As of October 2007, Domodedovo Airlines operated scheduled passenger flights to the following destinations:
Country	City	Airport	Notes
Russia
Russia	Anadyr	Ugolny Airport	
	Blagoveshchensk	Ignatyevo Airport	
	Khabarovsk	Khabarovsk Novy Airport	
	Krasnoyarsk	Krasnoyarsk Yemelyanovo Airport	
	Moscow	Domodedovo International Airport	Hub
	Petropavlovsk-Kamchatsky	Petropavlovsk-Kamchatsky Airport	
	Vladivostok	Vladivostok International Airport	
	Ulan-Ude (operated by Kras Air)	Ulan-Ude Airport	
	Yakutsk	Yakutsk Airport	
	Yekaterinburg	Koltsovo International Airport	
	Yuzhno-Sakhalinsk	Yuzhno-Sakhalinsk Airport	
Africa
Egypt	Hurghada	Hurghada International Airport	
Asia
Azerbaijan	Baku	Heydar Aliyev International Airport	
	Ganja	Ganja Airport	
China	Beijing	Beijing Capital International Airport	
Tajikistan	Dushanbe	Dushanbe Airport	
Uzbekistan	Bukhara	Bukhara Airport	
	Fergana	Fergana Airport	
	Samarkand	Samarkand Airport	
	Tashkent	Tashkent International Airport	

== Fleet ==
The Domodedovo Airlines fleet included the following aircraft (as of March 2007):

Domodedovo Airlines fleet
Aircraft	Photo	Total	Passengers	Notes
Ilyushin Il-96-300		5	252	
Tupolev Tu-154M		3	166	
Ilyushin Il-62M		5	174	
