= Perm Airlines =

Russian airline (1992–2009)

Federal State Unitary Enterprise "Perm Airlines" ФГУП «Пермские авиалинии»
IATA	ICAO	Call sign
9D	PGP	PERM AIR
- Founded: 1992
- Ceased operations: 2009
- Hubs: Perm-Bolshoye Savino
- Fleet size: 14
- Destinations: 4
- Parent company: Government owned
- Headquarters: Perm, Russia
- Key people: Vyacheslav Vasiliyevich Tekoyev (general director)
- Website: http://www.aviaperm.ru/

Perm Airlines (Russian: Пермские авиалинии) was an airline based in Perm, Russia. It operated domestic and international scheduled and charter services within Russia and the CIS. Its main base was Bolshoye Savino Airport, Perm.

== History ==
The airline was established and started operations in 1968. It was formed from the Aeroflot Perm Division (Ural RCAD). Throughout its operational history, Perm Airlines offered routes from Perm Bolshoye Savino airport to Moscow Sheremetyevo and Domodedovo airports, Ekaterinburg, Surgut, Baku, Novosibirsk and St. Petersburg (codeshare flight with St. Petersburg based Pulkovo Airlines). Furthermore, it operated charter flights to Adler/Sochi, Baikonur, Simferopol and Dubai. As a result of an agreement between Perm Airlines and Siberian Airlines (the current S7 Airlines), all regular Perm Airlines passenger flights were carried out by Sibir Airlines.

Perm Airlines had its license revoked on May 16, 2009.

== Fleet ==
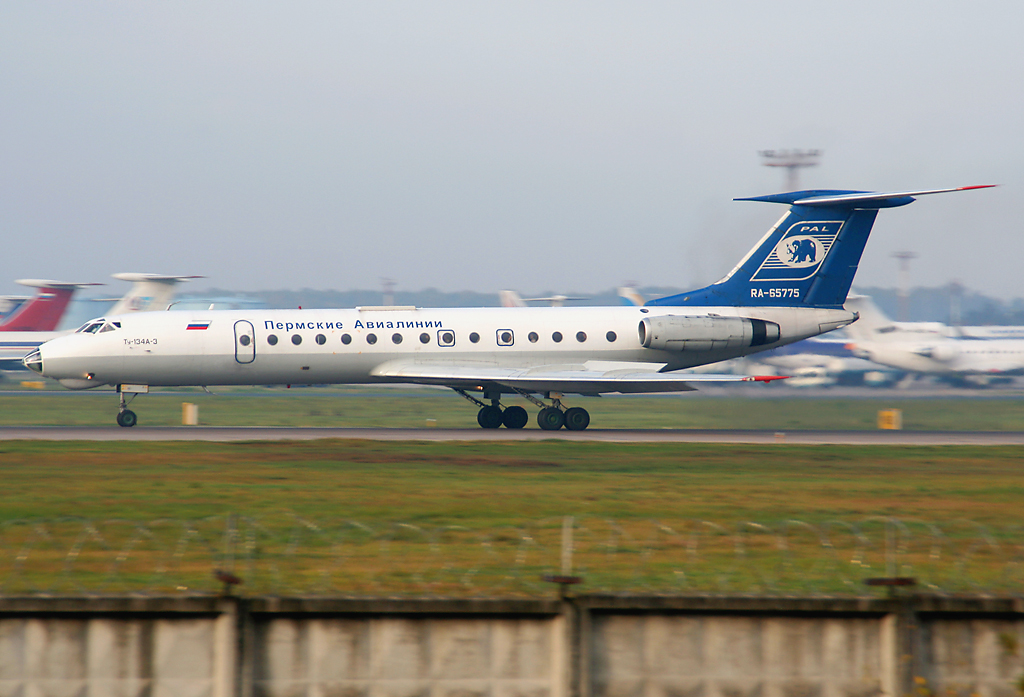
Tupolev Tu-134 of Perm Airlines

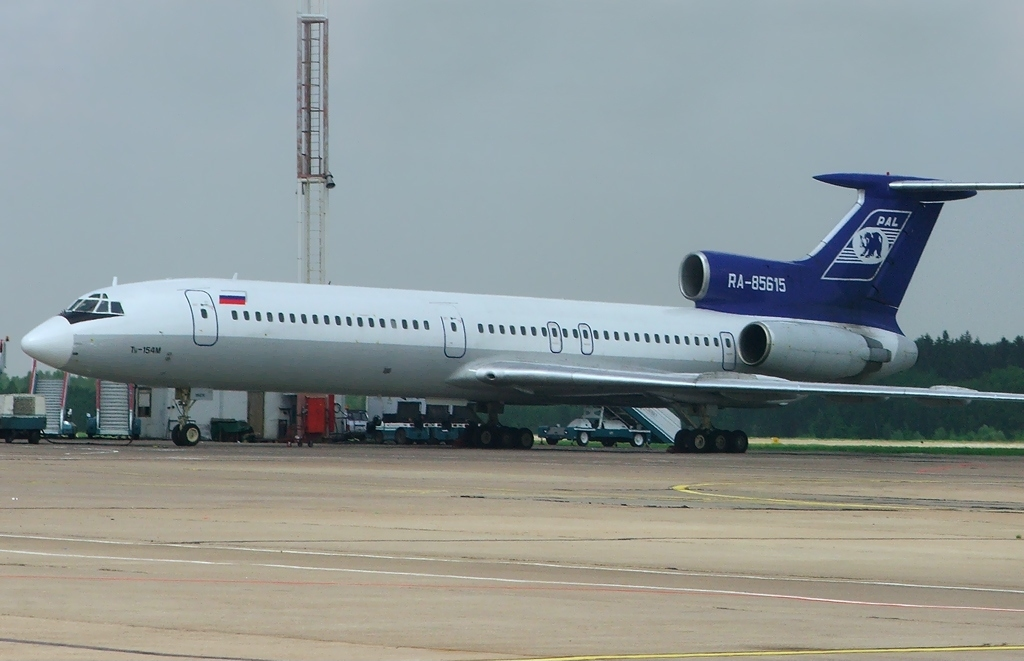
Tupolev Tu-154 of Perm Airlines

The Perm Airlines fleet includes the following aircraft (at May 2008):

- 1 Antonov An-24
- 2 Antonov An-26
- 3 Mil Mi-8T
- 4 Tupolev Tu-134A
- 2 Tupolev Tu-154B2
- 1 Tupolev Tu-154M
- 1 Yakovlev Yak-40

All three Tu-154 aircraft were leased by Sibir Airlines in 2006, to be phased out in 2008"Flying Bear: Perm Airlines".. Although the aircraft still stand at Perm Bolshoye Savino airport, the engines were removed and sold off in 2009.

== Accidents and incidents ==
- In October 2007, a 15-year-old boy snuck into the landing gear compartment of a Tupolev Tu-154 belonging to Perm Airlines and successfully flew to Moscow. He suffered from frostbite and had his fingers amputated. An employee of Perm Airlines was tried in the court because of his failure to inspect the plane carefully before departure.
