= Tupolev Tu-155 =

Soviet experimental aircraft

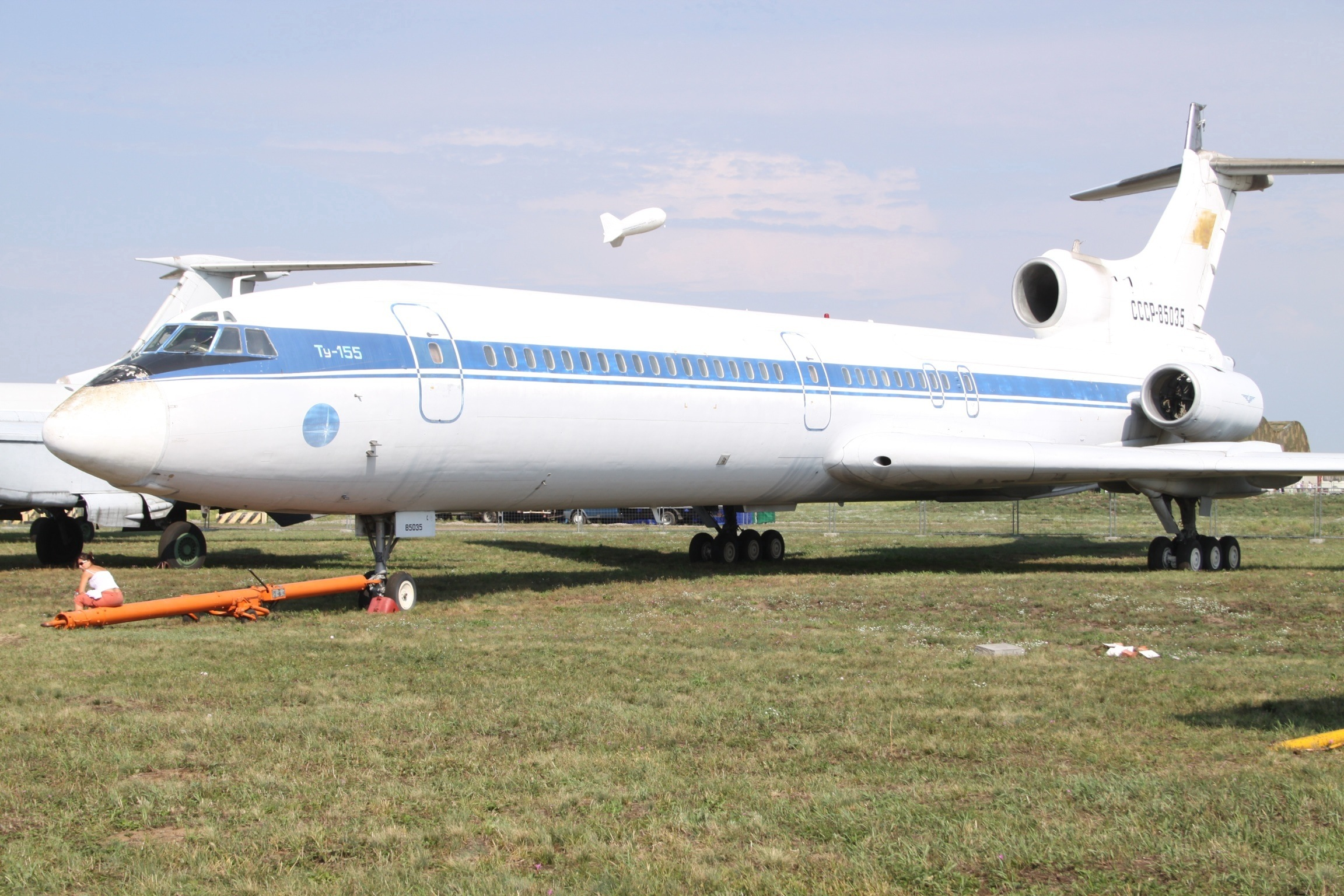
- СССР-85035

General information
- Type: Alternative fuel testbed aeroplane
- National origin: Soviet Union
- Manufacturer: Aviakor
- Status: Cancelled
- Primary user: Flight Testing Base of the Tupolev Design Bureau
- Number built: 1

History
- First flight: 15 April 1988
- Developed from: Tupolev Tu-154

The Tupolev Tu-155 is a modified Tupolev Tu-154 (СССР-85035) which was used as an alternative fuel testbed, and was the world's first experimental aircraft operating on hydrogen and later liquid natural gas. The similar Tu-156 was never built.

== Design and development ==
The Tu-155 first flew on 15 April 1988. It used first liquid hydrogen and later liquefied natural gas (LNG). It flew until the demise of the Soviet Union and it is currently stored at Ramenskoye Airport near Zhukovskiy. The Tu-156 was intended to fly circa 1997, but was cancelled due to the end of the Soviet Union. The aircraft used cryogenics to store fuel. The Tu-155 was a hybrid, only one of its three Kuznetsov NK-8 engines (they are now called NK-88) was actually powered by hydrogen. The fuel tank was located in the air-blown (or nitrogen) rear compartment. A distinctive feature of the aircraft is that the protrusion of the ventilation system is visible on the tail (near the no. 2 engine). The Tu-155 used Kuznetsov NK-88 engines. The Tu-156 was intended to use Kuznetsov NK-89 engines. The Tu-155 flew approximately 100 flights before it was placed in storage. However, only some flights were performed with hydrogen. From January 1989, Tupolev was mainly testing natural gas as a substitute for kerosene.

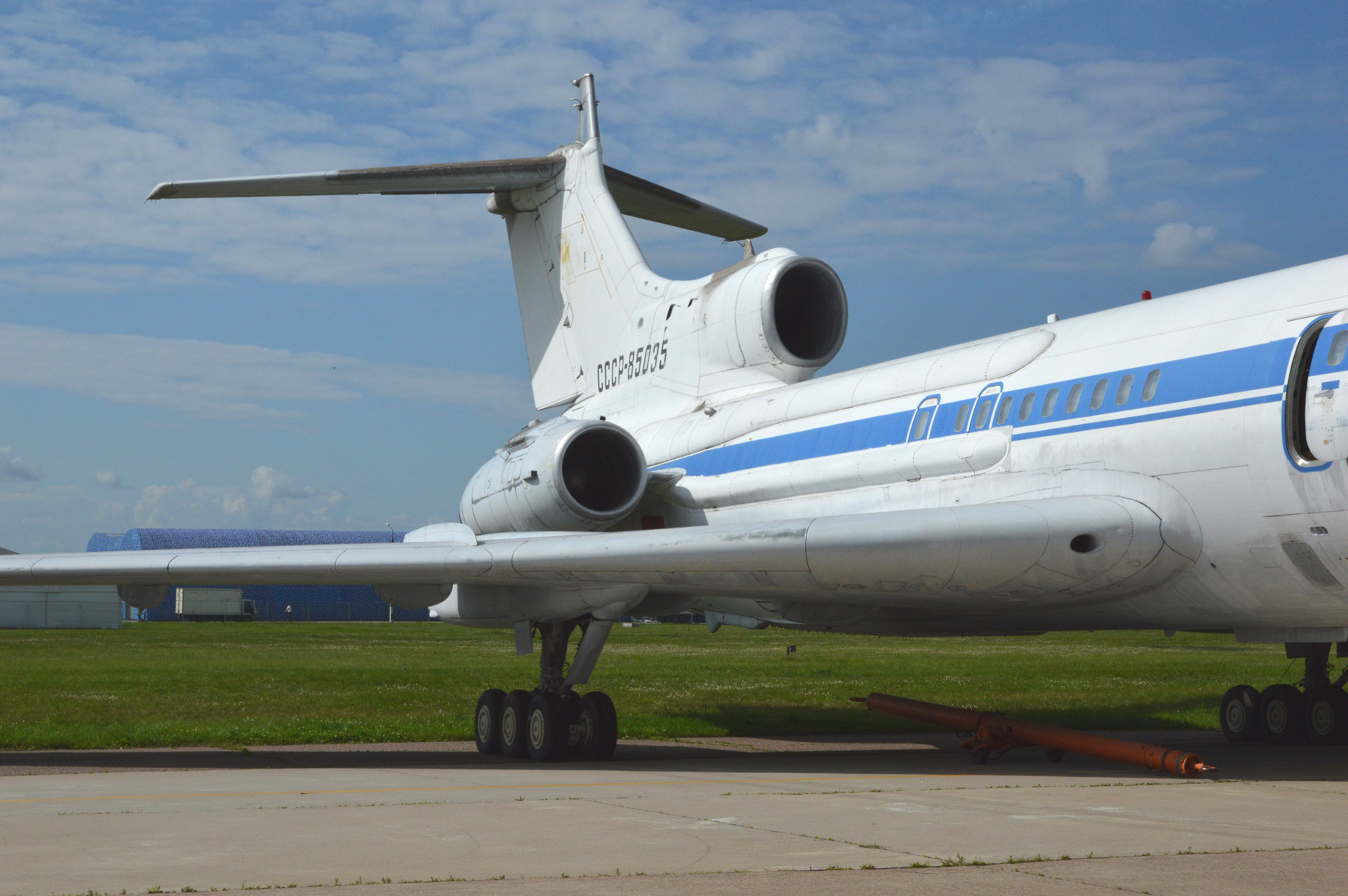
The alternative fuel Kuznetsov Engine

== See also ==
Related development

- Tupolev Tu-154

Related lists

- List of experimental aircraft
- Hydrogen-powered aircraft
