= Kuznetsov NK-89 =

1980s Soviet/Russian turbofan aircraft engine

NK-89
- Type: Turbofan
- National origin: Soviet Union
- Manufacturer: Kuznetsov Design Bureau
- First run: 1989
- Major applications: Tupolev Tu-155; Tupolev Tu-156
- Developed from: NK-88

The Kuznetsov NK-89 was an experimental alternative fuel turbofan engine, designed by the Kuznetsov Design Bureau.

== Development ==
The NK-89 was a modified version of the hydrogen-powered NK-88 and was designed to run on both liquified natural gas (LNG) and kerosene. It was intended for use on the proposed Tupolev Tu-156, a modified version of the Tupolev Tu-154B. This aircraft was to have cryogenic tanks in the rear of the cabin and forward baggage hold to store the LNG. Kerosene would be carried in the wing tanks. In January 1989, a test flight of a prototype of this engine was carried out onboard of the Tupolev Tu-155 flying laboratory where LNG was used as fuel.

By default, the engine would run on LNG, but kerosene could be used when flying out of airports where LNG is unavailable or in case of emergency. The switch from LNG to kerosene could be made in-flight in 5 seconds.

== Applications ==
- Tupolev Tu-155 (testbed)
- Tupolev Tu-156M (proposed)
- Tupolev Tu-156S (proposed)

== Specifications (NK-89) ==
Data from Otechestvennaya aviatsionno-kosmicheskaya tekhnika - SAMARSKIY NTK and janes.migavia.com

==== General characteristics ====
- Type: Two-spool alternative fuel turbofan
- Length:
- Diameter:
- Dry weight:

==== Components ====
- Compressor:
- Fuel type: LNG or kerosene

==== Performance ====
- Maximum thrust: 103 kN (23,000 lbf)
- Specific fuel consumption: 75.2 kg/(kN·h) in cruise on LNG

== See also ==
Comparable engines

- Kuznetsov NK-88
- Reaction Engines Scimitar

Related lists

- List of aircraft engines
