= Kuznetsov NK-88 =

1980s Soviet/Russian turbofan aircraft engine

NK-88
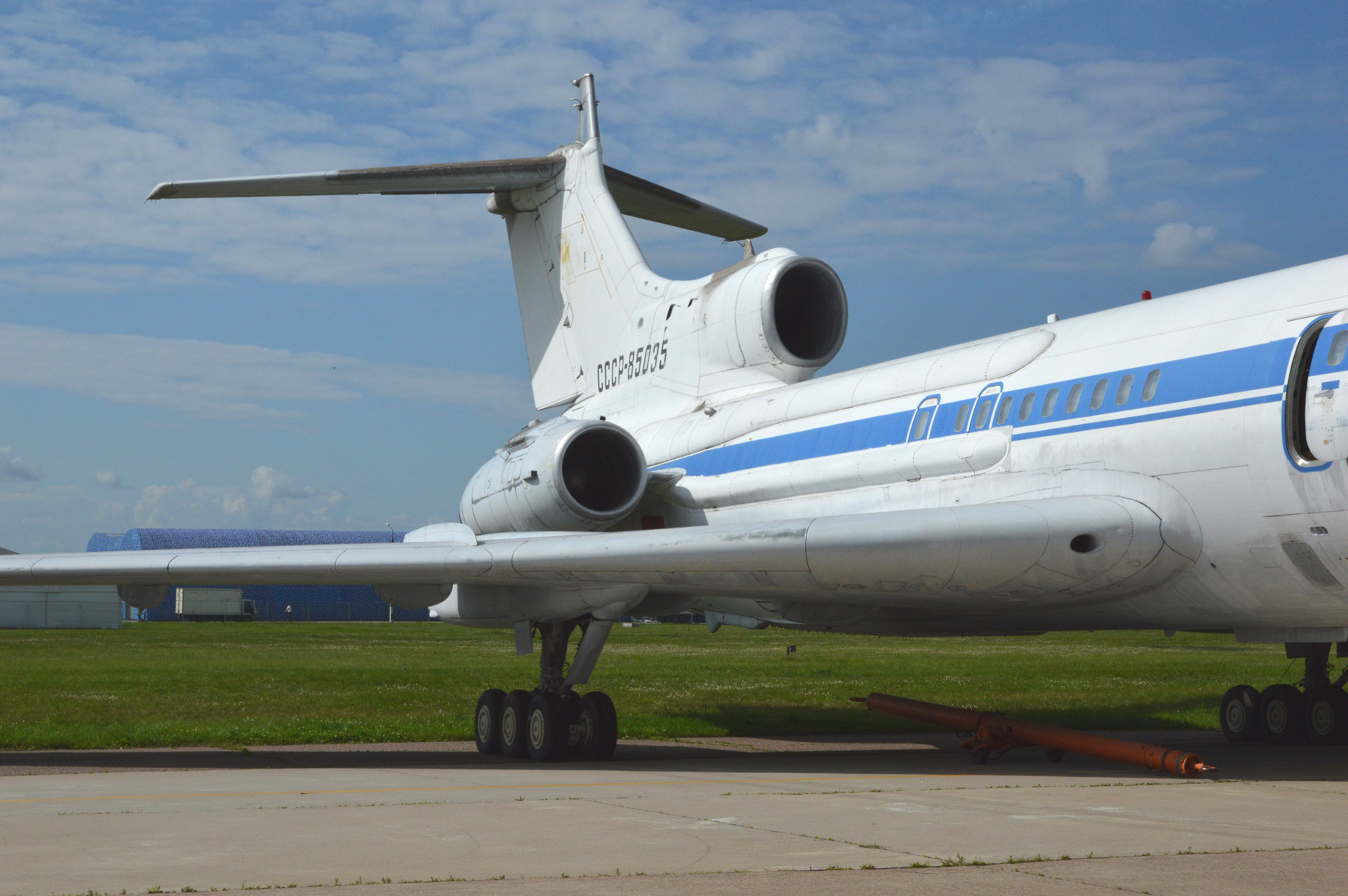
- One NK-88 engine was tested in flight in the starboard nacelle of this Tupolev Tu-155 (СССР-85035)
- Type: Turbofan
- National origin: Soviet Union
- Manufacturer: Kuznetsov Design Bureau
- First run: February 1980
- Major applications: Tupolev Tu-155
- Developed from: NK-8-2U
- Developed into: NK-89

The Kuznetsov NK-88 was an experimental alternative fuel turbofan engine, designed by the Kuznetsov Design Bureau.

== Development ==
Development of the NK-88 began in 1974 at the Kuznetsov Design Bureau. It was a modification of the NK-8-2U two-spool low-bypass turbofan and was designed to run on liquid hydrogen (LH_{2}). A further development of this engine, the NK-89, was designed to run on both liquified natural gas (LNG) and kerosene.

On April 15, 1988, one NK-88 running on cryogenically stored LH_{2} was tested in flight in the starboard nacelle of the Tupolev Tu-155 flying laboratory. The other two nacelles contained engines of the native NK-8-2 type and ran on kerosene.

== Applications ==
- Tupolev Tu-155 (testbed)

== Specifications (NK-88) ==
Data from Otechestvennaya aviatsionno-kosmicheskaya tekhnika - SAMARSKIY NTK and ram-home.com

==== General characteristics ====
- Type: Two-spool alternative fuel turbofan
- Length:
- Diameter:
- Dry weight: 2,300 kg (5,100 lb) (with heat exchanger and cryopump)

==== Components ====
- Compressor:
- Fuel type: LH_{2}

==== Performance ====
- Maximum thrust: 103 kN (23,000 lbf)
- Specific fuel consumption: 30 kg/(kN⋅h) in cruise on LH_{2}

== See also ==
Comparable engines

- Kuznetsov NK-89
- Reaction Engines Scimitar

Related lists

- List of aircraft engines
