= Omskavia =

Russian airline active from 1994 to 2008

IATA	ICAO	Call sign
N3	OMS	Omsk
- Founded: 1994
- Ceased operations: 2008
- Hubs: Tsentralny Airport
- Alliance: AiRUnion
- Headquarters: Omsk, Russia

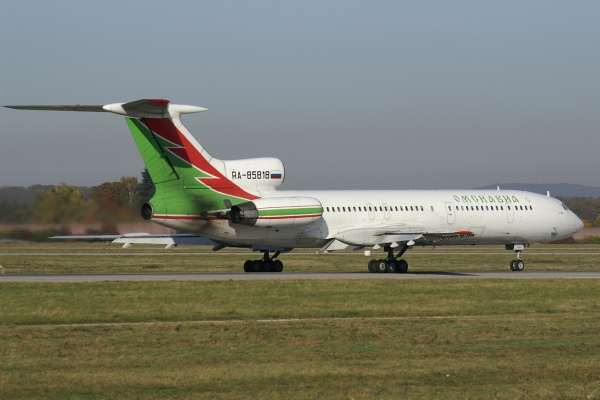
Omskavia Tupolev Tu-154M at Stuttgart Airport in Germany

Omskavia (Russian: ОмскА́виа) was an airline based in Omsk, Russia. It operated domestic and international scheduled and charter, passenger, cargo and mail services, as well as aircraft maintenance. Its main bases were Tsentralny Airport, Omsk, and Domodedovo International Airport, Moscow.

The airline joined the AirBridge alliance in 2004, which was restructured as AiRUnion in the summer of 2005. As of 17 October 2008 the Russian Aviation Authority suspended its flights.

== History ==
Omskavia was split off from Aeroflot in the early 1990s and was formed as a result of the separation of Omsk State Air Enterprise into airline and airport enterprises. It was established and started operations on 1 February 1994. The airline is owned by KrasAir (71%) and other shareholders (29%).

== Destinations ==
Omskavia has regular scheduled flights to Moscow, Nizhnevartovsk, Sochi in Russia, and Frankfurt, Hanover, Cologne in Germany. It also charters flights to the Mediterranean, Middle Eastern resorts and Thailand.

Since 1996, Omskavia has been leasing airplanes to Iranian airline Mahan Air. In 2006, four of Omskavia's Tu-154M are scheduled to fly in Iran.

== Fleet ==
The Omskavia fleet included the following aircraft (as of 3 June 2008):

- 3 Tupolev Tu-154M (which are operated for Kras Air)

On order: 4 Tupolev Tu-214
