= Podkamennaya Tunguska (rural locality) =

Podkamennaya Tunguska Подкаменная Тунгуска
- Village
- Interactive map of Podkamennaya Tunguska
- Location of Podkamennaya Tunguska Podkamennaya Tunguska (Krasnoyarsk Krai)
- Coordinates: 61°36′N 90°07′E
- Country: Russia
- Federal subject: Krasnoyarsk Krai
- Administrative district: Turukhansky District
- SelsovietSelsoviet: Borsky Selsoviet

Population (2010 Census)
  - Total: 41
  - Estimate (2010): 41 (0%)

Municipal status
  - Municipal district: Turukhansky Municipal District
  - Rural settlement: Borsky Rural Settlement
- Time zone: UTC+7 (MSK+4)
- Postal code: 663246
- OKTMO ID: 04654404111

Podkamennaya Tunguska (Russian: Подка́менная Тунгу́ска) is a rural locality (a village) in Borsky Selsoviet of Turukhansky District in Krasnoyarsk Krai, Russia, located at the confluence of the Podkamennaya Tunguska and Yenisei Rivers on the Yenisei River's side opposite to the settlement of Bor and the Podkamennaya Tunguska Airport. It had a population of 41 as of 2010.

Within the framework of municipal divisions, the village is a part of Borsky Rural Settlement in Turukhansky Municipal District.
