= Tupolev Tu-154 =

Soviet and Russian medium-range trijet airliner

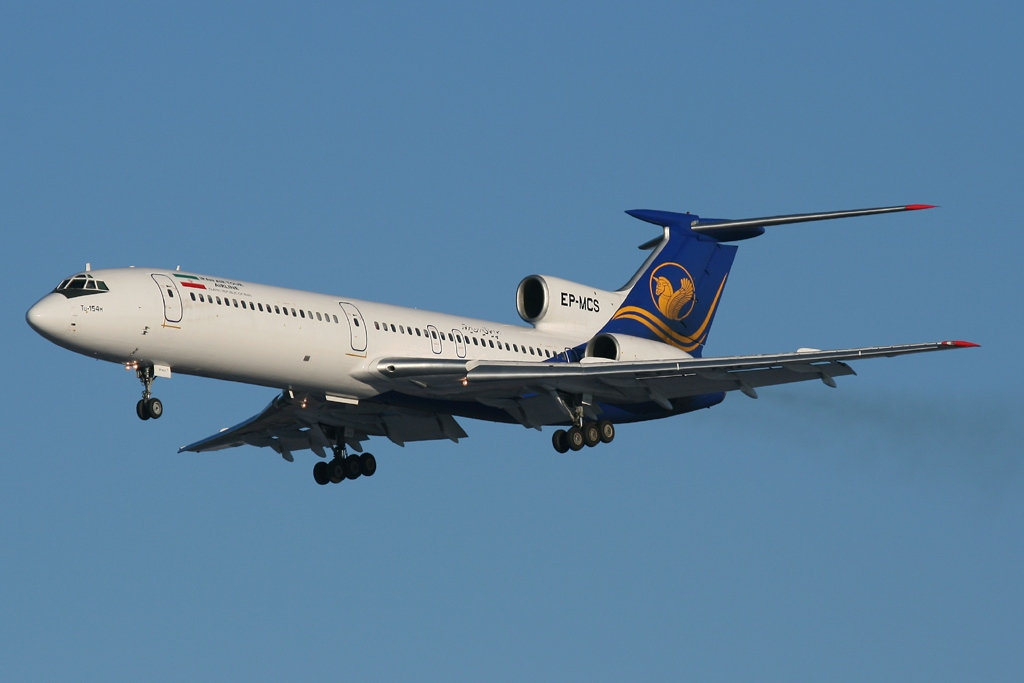
- An Iran Airtour Tu-154M

General information
- Type: Narrow-body jet airliner
- National origin: Soviet Union and Russian Federation
- Manufacturer: Aviakor
- Designer: Tupolev Design Bureau
- Status: In limited service
- Primary users: Russian Air Force People's Liberation Army Air Force; Air Koryo; Aeroflot (historical)
- Number built: 1,026

History
- Manufactured: 1968–1997 (last aircraft delivered in 2013)
- Introduction date: 7 February 1972 with Aeroflot
- First flight: 4 October 1968; 58 years ago
- Variant: Tupolev Tu-155

The Tupolev Tu-154 (Russian: Туполев Ту-154; NATO reporting name: "Careless") is a three-engined, medium-range, narrow-body airliner designed in the mid-1960s and manufactured by Tupolev. A workhorse of Soviet and (subsequently) Russian airlines for several decades, it carried half of all passengers flown by Aeroflot and its subsidiaries (137.5 million/year or 243.8 billion passenger-km in 1990), remaining the standard domestic-route airliner of Russia and former Soviet states until the mid-2000s. It was exported to 17 non-Russian airlines and used as a head-of-state transport by the air forces of several countries.

The aircraft has a cruising speed of 850 km/h (460 kn; 530 mph) and a range of 5,280 km (3,280 mi). Capable of operating from unpaved and gravel airfields with only basic facilities, it was widely used in the extreme Arctic conditions of Russia's northern/eastern regions, where other airliners were unable to operate. Originally designed for a 45,000-hour service life (18,000 cycles), but capable of 80,000 hours with upgrades, it was expected to continue in service until 2016, although newer noise regulations have restricted it from flying to Western Europe and other regions.

== Development ==
The Tu-154 was developed to meet Aeroflot's requirement to replace the jet-powered Tu-104 and the Antonov An-10 and Ilyushin Il-18 turboprops. The requirements called for either a payload capacity of 16–18 t (35,000–40,000 lb) with a range of 2,850–4,000 km (1,770–2,490 mi; 1,540–2,160 nmi) while cruising at 900 km/h (560 mph; 490 kn), or a payload of 5.8 t (13,000 lb) with a range of 5,800–7,000 km (3,600–4,300 mi; 3,100–3,800 nmi) while cruising at 850 km/h (530 mph; 460 kn). A take-off distance of 2,600 m (8,500 ft) at maximum takeoff weight was also stipulated as a requirement. Conceptually similar to the British Hawker Siddeley Trident, which first flew in 1962, and the American Boeing 727, which first flew in 1963, the medium-range Tu-154 was marketed by Tupolev at the same time as Ilyushin was marketing its long-range Ilyushin Il-62. The Soviet Ministry of Aircraft Industry chose the Tu-154, as it incorporated the latest in Soviet aircraft design and best met Aeroflot's anticipated requirements for the 1970s and 1980s.

The first project chief was Sergey Yeger; in 1964, Dmitryi S. Markov assumed that position. In 1975, the project lead role was turned over to Aleksandr S. Shengardt.

The Tu-154 first flew on 4 October 1968. The first deliveries to Aeroflot were in 1970 with freight (mail) services beginning in May 1971 and passenger services in February 1972. Limited production of the 154M model was still occurring as of January 2009, despite previous announcements of the end of production in 2006. In total, 1025 Tu-154s have been built, 214 of which were still in service as of 14 December 2009. The last serial Tu-154 was delivered to the Russian Defense Ministry on 19 February 2013 from the Aviakor factory, equipped with upgraded avionics, a VIP interior, and a communications suite. The factory has four unfinished airframes in its inventory, which can be completed if new orders are received.

== Design ==
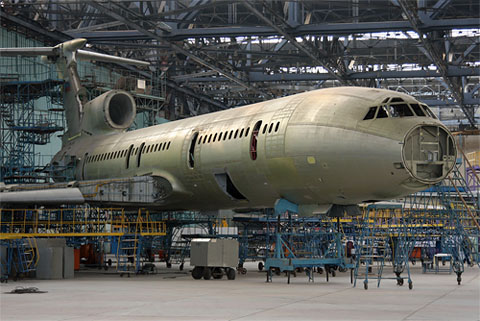
Tu-154 for Russian Ministry of Defence Manufacturing, Aviakor plant, 2009, one of several airframes built in the 1990s and left unsold

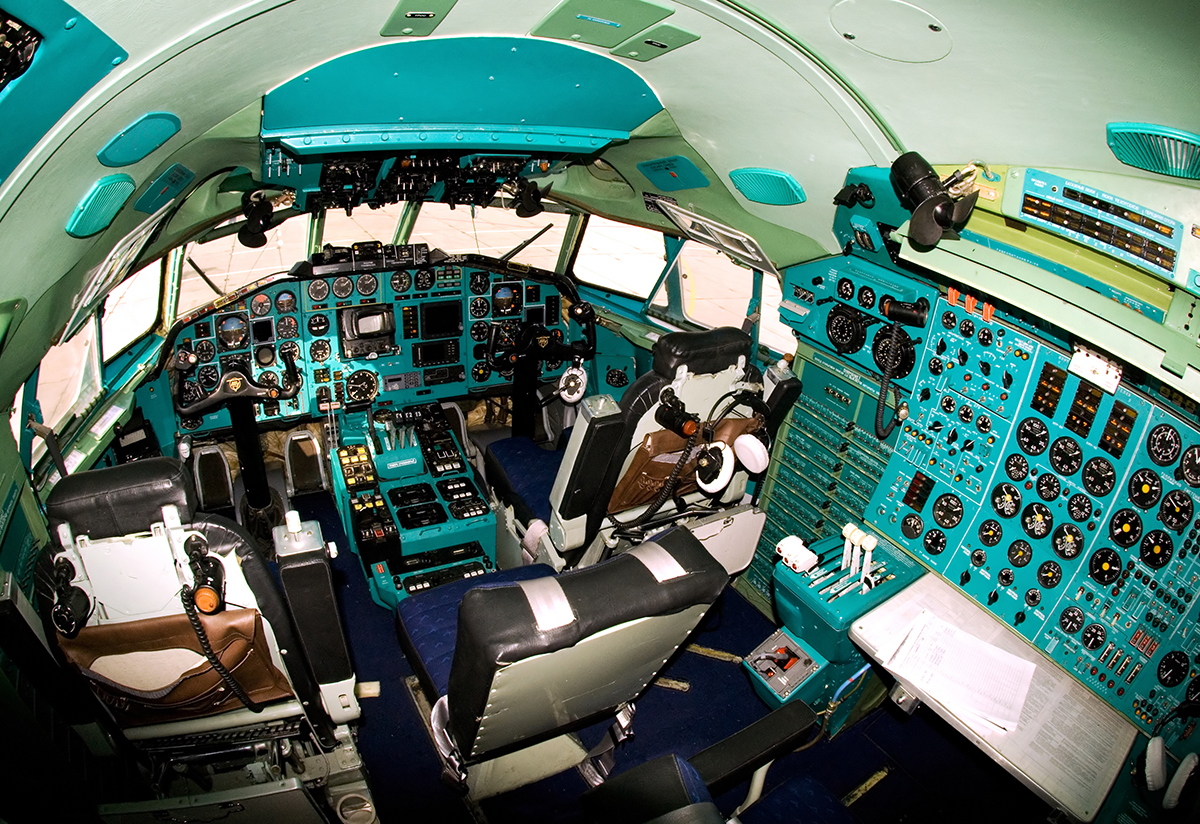
The cockpit of the Tupolev Tu-154

The Tu-154 is powered by three rear-mounted, low-bypass turbofan engines arranged similarly to those of the Boeing 727, but it is slightly larger than its American counterpart. Both the 727 and the Tu-154 use an S-duct for the middle (number-two) engine. The original model was equipped with Kuznetsov NK-8-2 engines, which were replaced with Soloviev D-30KU-154s in the Tu-154M. All Tu-154 aircraft models have a relatively high thrust-to-weight ratio, giving the type excellent performance, though at the expense of lower fuel efficiency. This became an important factor in later decades as fuel costs grew. The cockpit is fitted with conventional dual yoke control columns. Flight control surfaces are hydraulically operated.

The cabin of the Tu-154, although of the same six-abreast seating layout, gives the impression of an oval interior, with a lower ceiling than is common on Boeing and Airbus airliners. The passenger cabin accommodates 128 passengers in a two-class layout and 164 passengers in single-class layout, and up to 180 passengers in high-density layout. The layout can be modified to a winter version where some seats are taken out and a wardrobe is installed for passenger coats. The passenger doors are smaller than on its Boeing and Airbus counterparts. Luggage space in the overhead compartments is very limited.

Like the Tupolev Tu-134, the Tu-154 has a wing swept back at 35° at the quarter-chord line. The British Hawker Siddeley Trident has the same sweepback angle, while the Boeing 727 has a slightly smaller sweepback angle of 32°. The wing also has anhedral (downward sweep) which is a distinguishing feature of Russian low-wing airliners designed during this era. Most Western low-wing airliners such as the contemporary Boeing 727 have dihedral (upward sweep). The anhedral means that Russian airliners have less lateral stability compared to their Western counterparts, but also are more resistant to Dutch roll tendencies.

Considerably heavier than its predecessor Soviet-built airliner, the Ilyushin Il-18, the Tu-154 was equipped with an oversized landing gear to reduce ground load, enabling it to operate from the same runways, including limited gravel capability. The aircraft has two six-wheel main bogies fitted with large, low-pressure tires that retract into pods extending from the trailing edges of the wings (a common Tupolev feature), plus a two-wheel nose gear unit. Soft oleo struts (shock absorbers) provide a much smoother ride on bumpy airfields than most airliners, which very rarely operate on such poor surfaces.

The original requirement was to have a three-person flight crew – captain, first officer, and flight engineer – as opposed to a four- or five-person crew, as on other Soviet airliners. A fourth crew member, a navigator, was soon found to be still needed, and a seat was added on production aircraft, although that workstation was compromised due to the limitations of the original design. Navigators are no longer trained, and this profession is becoming obsolete with the retirement of the oldest Soviet-era planes.

The last variant (Tu-154M-100, introduced 1998) includes an NVU-B3 Doppler navigation system, a triple autopilot, which provides an automatic ILS approach according to ICAO category II weather minima, an autothrottle, a Doppler drift and speed measure system, and a "Kurs-MP" radio navigation suite. A stability and control augmentation system improves handling characteristics during manual flight. Modern upgrades normally include modernised TCAS, GPS, and other systems (mostly American- or EU-made).

Early versions of the Tu-154 cannot be modified to meet the current Stage III noise regulations, so are no longer allowed to fly into airspace where such regulations are enforced, such as the European Union, but the Tu-154M's D-30 engines can be fitted with hush kits, allowing them to meet noise regulations.

== Variants ==
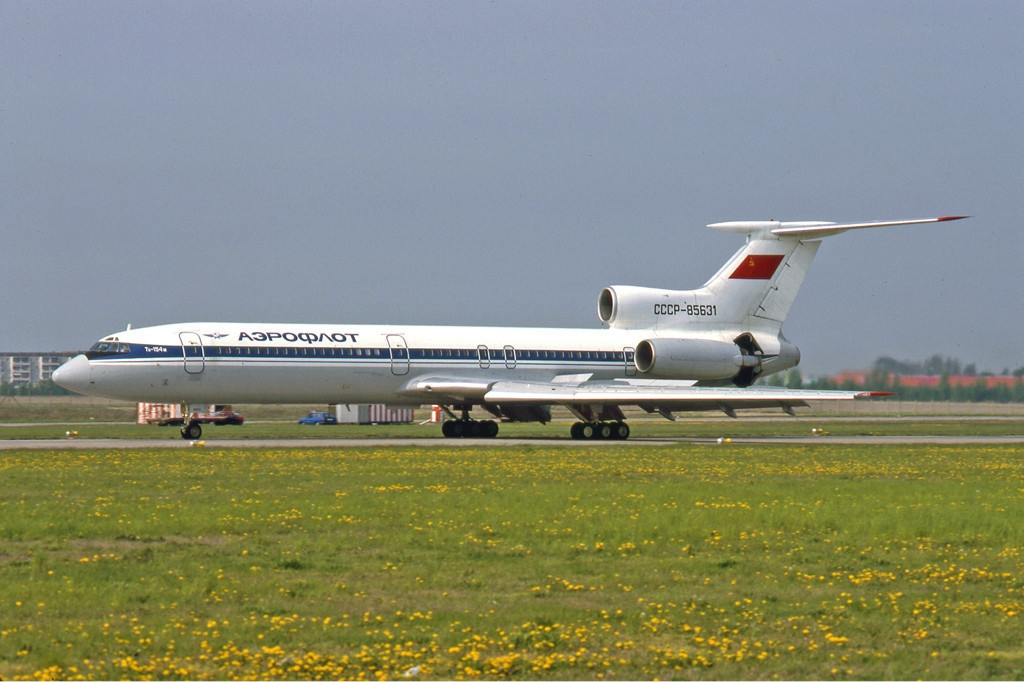
Aeroflot Tu-154

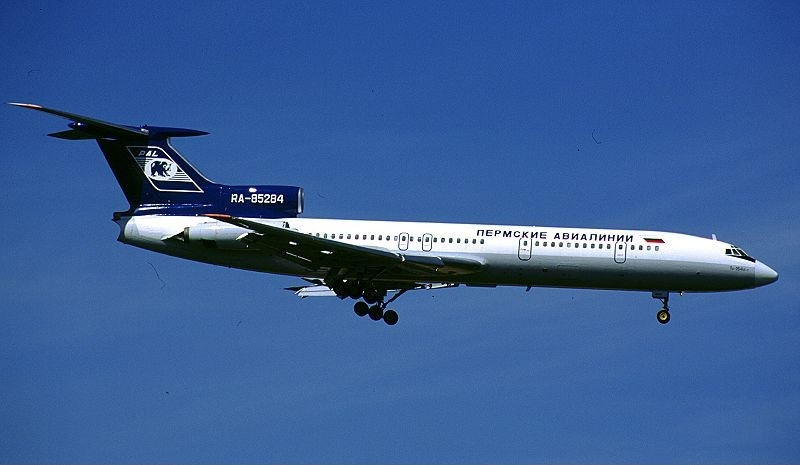
Perm Airlines Tu-154B-1

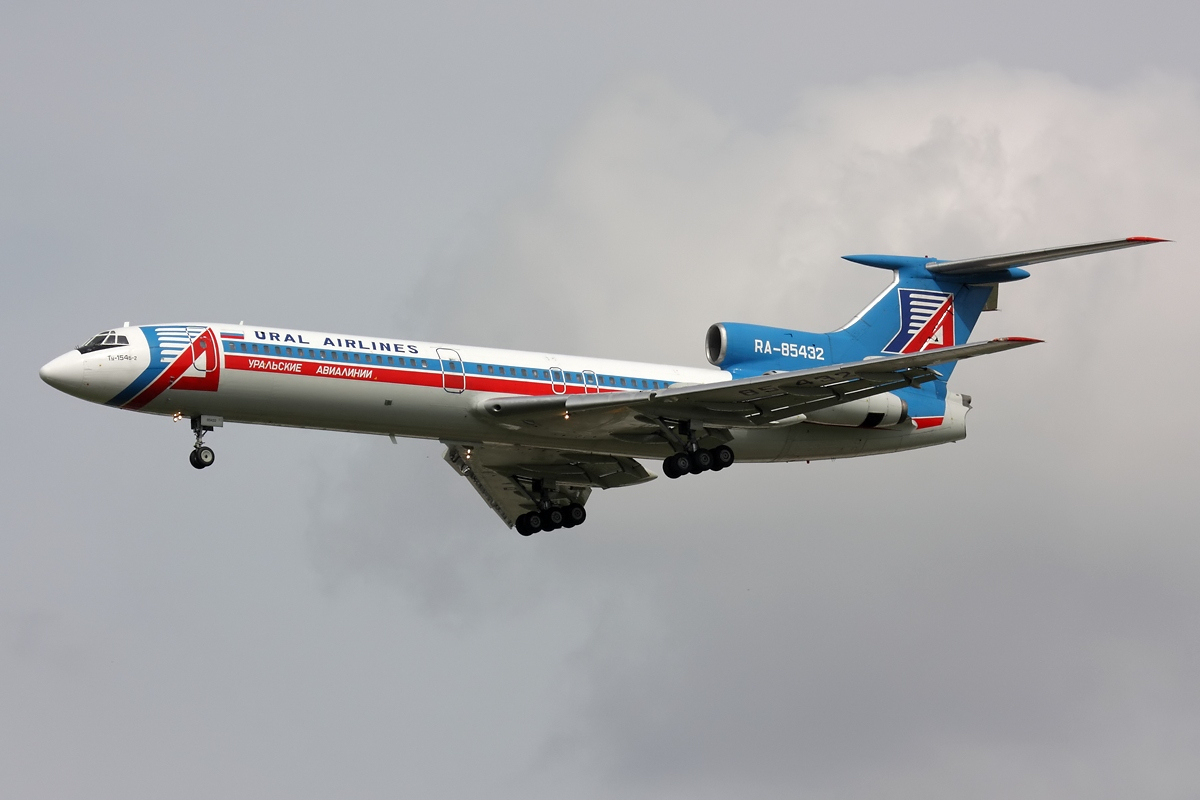
Ural Airlines Tu-154B-2

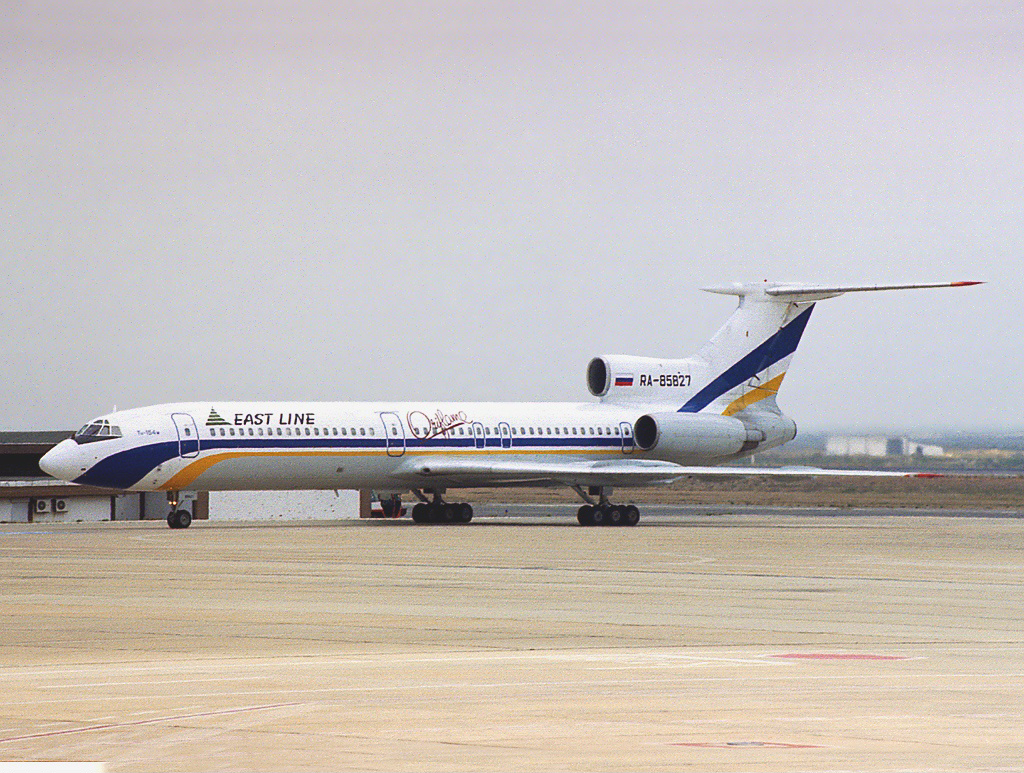
East Line Airlines Tu-154M

Many variants of this airliner have been built. Like its Western counterpart, the Boeing 727, many of the Tu-154s in service have been hush-kitted, and some converted to freighters.

Tu-154
Tu-154 production started in 1970, and the first passenger flight was performed on 9 February 1972. Powered by Kuznetsov NK-8-2 turbofans, it carried 164 passengers. About 42 were built.

Tu-154A
The first upgraded version of the original Tu-154, the A model, in production since 1974, added center-section fuel tanks and more emergency exits, while engines were upgraded to higher-thrust Kuznetsov NK-8-2U. Other upgrades include automatic flaps/slats and stabilizer controls and modified avionics. Max. takeoff weight – 94,000 kg (207,000 lb). There were 15 different interior layouts for the different domestic and international customers, seating between 144 and 152 passengers. To discern the A model from the base model note the spike at the junction of the fin and tail. This is a fat bullet on the A model, and a slender spike on the base model.

Tu-154B
As the original Tu-154 and Tu-154A suffered wing cracks after a few years in service, a version with a new, stronger wing, designated Tu-154B, went into production in 1975. It also had an additional fuselage fuel tank, additional emergency exits in the tail. Also, the maximum takeoff weight increased to 98,000 kg (216,000 lb). Important to Aeroflot was the increased passenger capacity, hence lower operating costs. With the NK-8-2U engines the only way to improve the economics of the airplane was to spread costs across more seats. The autopilot was certified for ICAO Category II automatic approaches. Most previously built Tu-154 and Tu-154A were also modified into this variant, with the replacement of the wing. Maximum takeoff weight increased to 96,000 kg (212,000 lb). 111 were built.

Tu-154B-1
Aeroflot wanted this version for increased revenue on domestic routes. It carried 160 passengers. This version also had some minor modifications to the fuel system, avionics, air conditioning, and landing gear. 64 were built from 1977 to 1978.

Tu-154B-2
A minor modernization of Tu-154B-1, equipped with navigation systems capable of cooperating with Western systems. Can be flown by a three-person crew – pilot, copilot and flight engineer –, due to the requirement of Malév (the Soviets insisted on keeping four or five person flight crews, while Malév deemed this economically inapprovable). The airplane was designed to be converted from the 160-passenger version to a 180-passenger version by removing the galley. The procedure took about 2 1/2 hours. Some of the earlier Tu-154Bs were modified to that standard. Maximum takeoff weight increased to 98,000 kg (216,000 lb), later to 100,000 kg (220,000 lb). Some 311 aircraft were built, including VIP versions. A few remain in service.

Tu-154S
The Tu-154S is an all-cargo or freighter version of the Tu-154B, using a strengthened floor, and adding a forward cargo door on the port side of the fuselage. The aircraft could carry nine Soviet PAV-3 pallets. Maximum payload – 20,000 kg (44,000 lb). There were plans for 20 aircraft, but only nine were converted, two from Tu-154 models and seven from Tu-154B models. Trials were held in the early 1980s and the aircraft was authorized regular operations in 1984. By 1997 all had been retired.

Tu-154M
The Tu-154M and Tu-154M Lux are the most highly upgraded versions, which first flew in 1982 and entered mass production in 1984. It uses more fuel-efficient Soloviev D-30KU-154 turbofans. Together with significant aerodynamic refinement, this led to much lower fuel consumption hence longer range, as well as lower operating costs. The aircraft has new double-slotted (instead of triple-slotted) flaps, with an extra 36-degree position (in addition to existing 15, 28 and 45-degree positions on older versions), which allows reduction of noise on approach. It also has a relocated auxiliary power unit and numerous other improvements. Maximum takeoff weight increased first to 100,000 kg (220,000 lb), then to 102,000 kg (225,000 lb). Some aircraft are certified to 104,000 kg (229,000 lb). About 320 were manufactured. Mass production ended in 2006, though limited manufacturing continued as of January 2009. No new airframes have been built since the early 1990s, and production since then involved assembling aircraft from components on hand. Chinese Tu-154MD electronic intelligence aircraft carry a large-size synthetic-aperture radar (SAR) under their mainframe.

Tu-154M Armita
Testbed with an offset RF-5 Tiger cockpit installed on the tailplane modified by the Iranian Aircraft Manufacturing Industry (registration EP-MCS, MSN 88A795) for launching indigenously-manufactured ejection seats safely away from the main fuselage when developing fighter projects.

Tu-154M-LK-1
Cosmonaut trainer. The forward baggage compartment was converted into a camera bay, as the aircraft was used to train cosmonauts in observation and photographic techniques. Later converted into Open Skies treaty observation aircraft.

Tu-154M-ON monitoring aircraft
Germany modified one of the Tu-154s it inherited from the former East German Air Force into an observation airplane. This aircraft was involved with the Open Skies inspection flights. It was converted at the Elbe Aircraft Plant (Elbe Flugzeugwerke) in Dresden, and flew in 1996. After 24 monitoring missions, it was lost in a mid-air collision in 1997.

The Russians also converted a Tu-154M to serve as an Open Skies monitoring aircraft. They used the Tu-154M-LK-1, and converted it to a Tu-154M-ON. When not flying over North America, it is used to ferry cosmonauts. China is believed to have converted one Tu-154 to an electronic countermeasures aircraft.

Tu-154M-100
Design of this variant started in 1994, but the first aircraft were not delivered until 1998. It is an upgraded version with Western avionics, including the Flight Management Computer, GPS, EGPWS, TCAS, and other modern systems. The airplane could carry up to 157 passengers. The cabin featured an automatic oxygen system and larger overhead bins. Three were produced, as payment of debts owed by Russia to Slovakia. Three aircraft were delivered in 1998 to Slovak Airlines, and sold back to Russia in 2003.

Tu-155
A Tu-154 converted into a testbed for alternative fuels. It first flew in 1988 and was used until the fall of the Soviet Union, when it was placed in storage.

== Proposed variants ==
Tu-156
Proposed conversions of three Tu-154s with Kuznetsov NK-89 turbofans running on liquid natural gas. Not proceeded with.

Tu-164
Initial designation of the Tu-154M.

Tu-174
Proposed stretched version of Tu-154.

Tu-194
Proposed shortened version of Tu-154.

== Operators ==
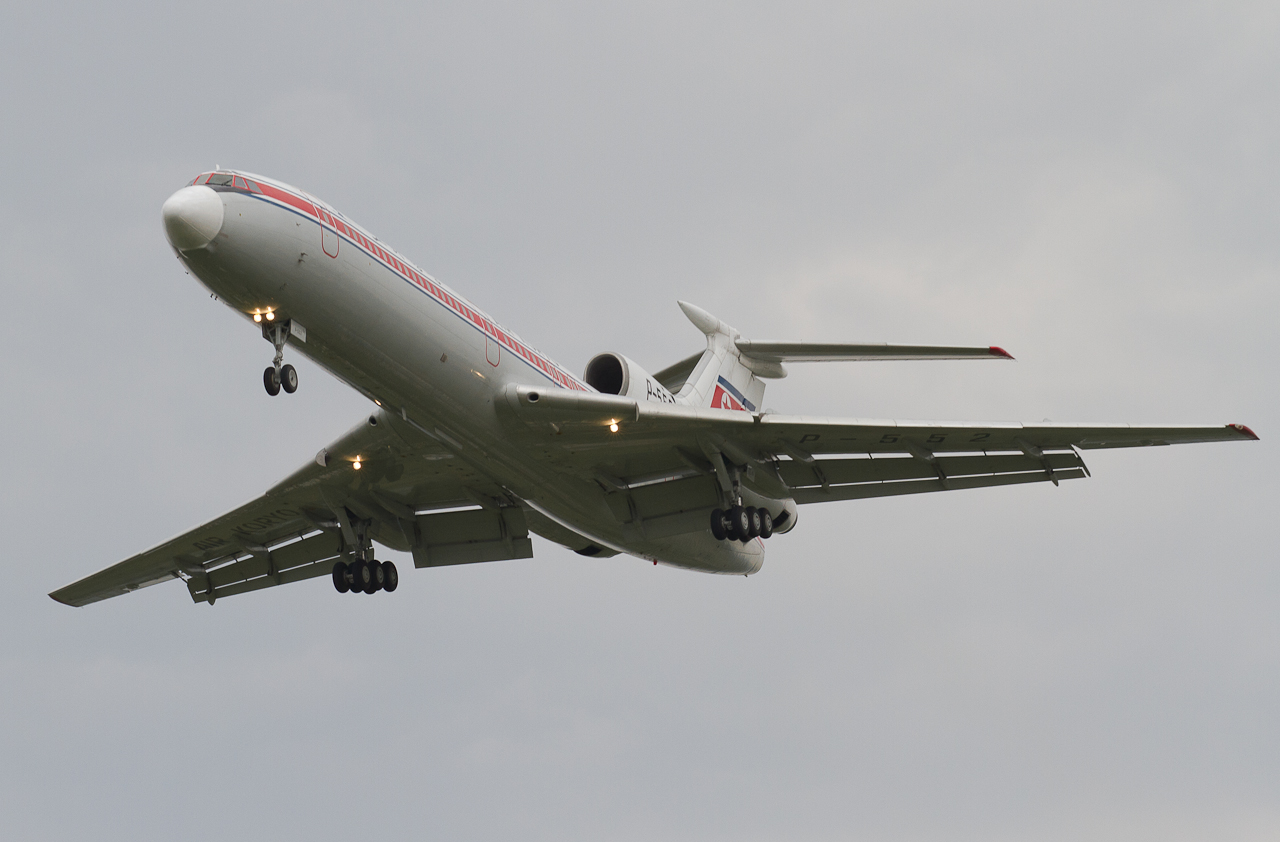
Air Koryo Tu-154B

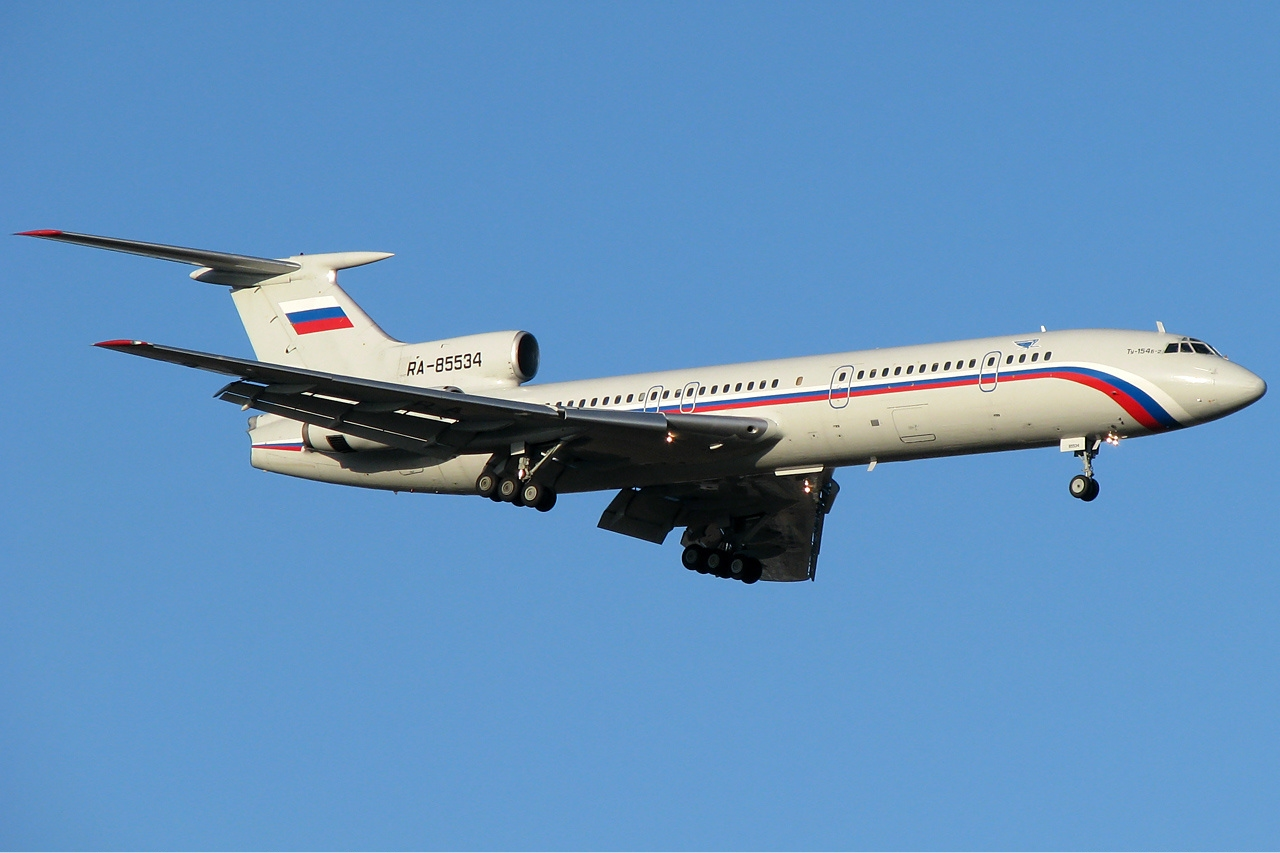
Russian Air Force Tu-154B-2

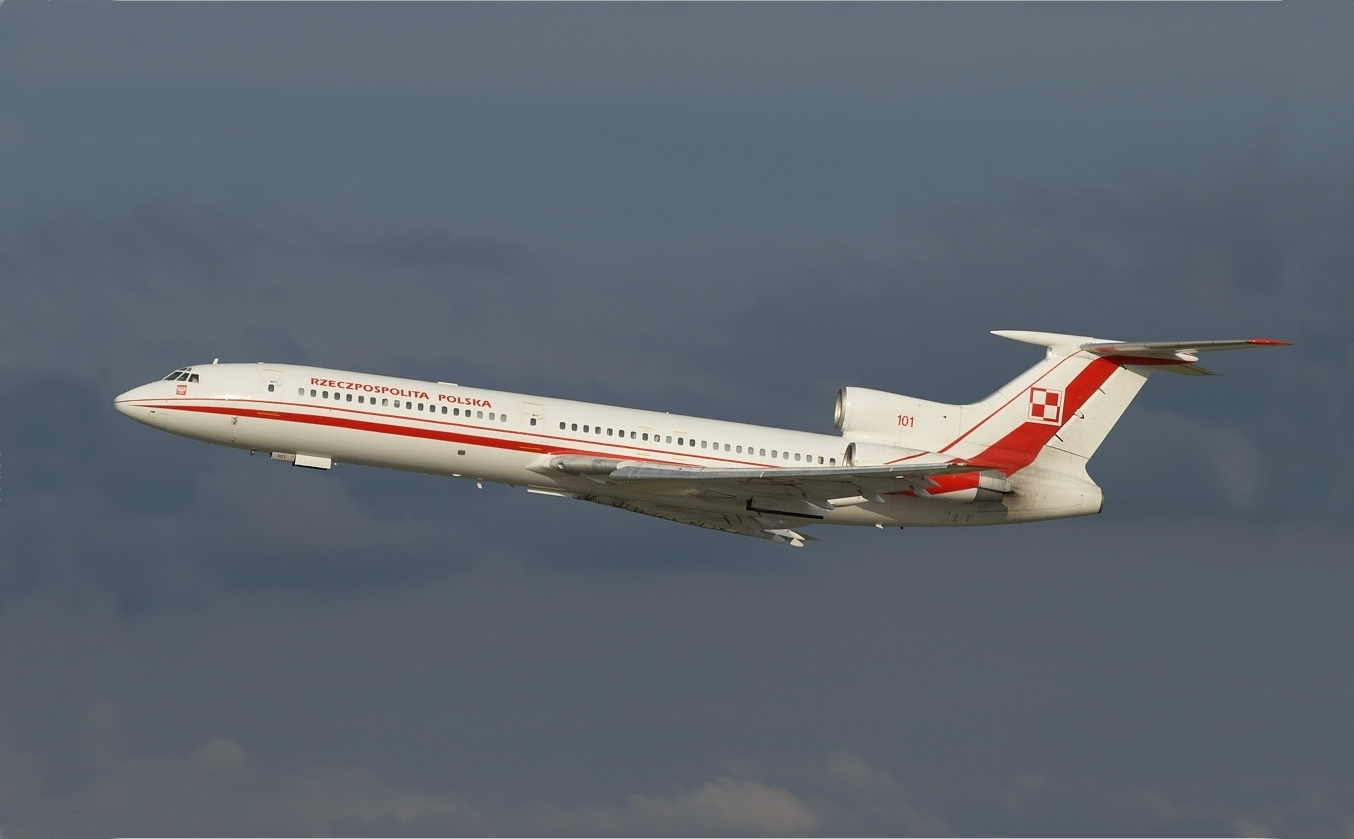
Polish military VIP transport Tu-154M Lux aircraft from the dissolved 36th Special Air Transport Regiment. This one crashed in heavy fog at Smolensk North Airport on 10 April 2010, killing all occupants, including the Polish President

=== Current operators and owners ===
As of August 2025, there were about 25 Tu-154 aircraft, of all variants still in government or military service, in up to five countries.

In June 2015, the operators were:

Airline	In service	Notes
(North Korea) Air Koryo	1	Only civil passenger operator as of 2015.
Armed Forces of the Republic of Kazakhstan	1	
(Russia) Federal Security Service	2	
Government of Kyrgyzstan	1	
(Russia) Gromov Flight Research Institute	1	
(China) People's Liberation Army Air Force	12	
(Russia) Russian Aerospace Forces	16	
Russian Ministry of Internal Affairs for the Government of Russia	4	
(Russia) Russian Navy	2	
(Russia) Siberian Aviation Research Institute	1	
(Russia) Yuri Gagarin Cosmonaut Training Center	1	
Total	42	

One Tupolev Tu-154 was sighted flying with Air Kyrgyzstan in 2017, but has never been listed by the airline as part of its fleet.

One aircraft is owned, but no longer operated by, the Polish Air Force. After the 2010 crash of Tu-154, serial no. 101, use of a surviving Tu-154, s/n 102, was suspended. The Polish government decided not to use or sell or dispose of 102 until an investigation into the crash of 101 was completed. 102 was put into secure storage at the Mińsk Mazowiecki airbase and the operating unit, the 36th Special Aviation Regiment, was disbanded. In 2020, it was reported, by an investigation team led by Antoni Macierewicz, that the aircraft had structural damage of some kind. As of June 2021, 102 was considered unlikely to return to service, since the Polish government had already replaced it with a fleet of brand-new, more fuel-efficient jets, like the Gulfstream G550 and the Boeing 737 NG.

=== Operational history ===
In January 2009 Russian flag carrier Aeroflot announced the retirement of its Tu-154 fleet after 40 years, with the last scheduled flight being Aeroflot Flight 736 from Yekaterinburg to Moscow on 31 December 2009. In December 2010, Uzbekistan Airways also declared that it was retiring its Tu-154s, replaced by the Airbus A320. In February 2011, all remaining Iranian Tu-154s were grounded after two incidents.

On 27 December 2016, the Russian Ministry of Defence announced that it had grounded all of its Tu-154s until the end of the investigation into the December 2016 crash of a 1983 Tupolev Tu-154. This was followed by the grounding of all Tu-154s in Russia. The Tu-154 had crashed into the Black Sea just after takeoff from Sochi, Russia, on 25 December 2016 killing all 92 people on board, including 64 members of the Alexandrov Ensemble, an official army choir of the Russian Armed Forces.

In October 2020 ALROSA, the last Russian passenger airline to operate this aircraft, retired its last remaining Tu-154.

=== Former operators ===
==== Former civil operators ====
Afghanistan

- Ariana Afghan Airlines
- Bakhtar Afghan Airlines

Albania

- Albanian Airlines

Armenia

- Armenian Airlines
- Arax Airways

Azerbaijan

- Azerbaijan Airlines
- Imair Airlines
- Turan Air

Belarus

- Belavia

Bulgaria

- Air Via
- Balkan Bulgarian Airlines
- BH Air
- Bulgarian Air Charter
- Government of Bulgaria
- Hemus Air

China

- CAAC Airlines
- China Northwest Airlines
- China Southwest Airlines
- China United Airlines
- China Xinjiang Airlines
- Sichuan Airlines

Central African Republic

- Centrafrican Airlines

Croatia

- Air Adriatic (never obtained)

Cuba

- Cubana

Czech Republic

- CSA Czech Airlines
- Smartwings

Czechoslovakia

- CSA Czechoslovak Airlines

Djibouti

- Daallo Airlines

East Germany

- Interflug

Egypt

- EgyptAir
- Cairo Charter & Cargo

Estonia

- ELK Airways

Georgia

- Air Georgia
- Transair Georgia

Germany

- Stuttgart Airport Authority

Guyana

- Guyana Airways

Hungary

- Malev Hungarian Airlines
- Pannon Airlines

Iran

- Bon Air
- Caspian Airlines
- HESA (Operating Armita Labs that are Tu-154 converted to flying laboratories)
- Iran Air Tours
- Kish Air
- Mahan Air
- Taban Air

Kazakhstan

- Air Kazakhstan
- Aeroservice Kazakhstan
- Atyrau Airways
- Kazakhstan Airlines
- Sayakhat Airlines

Kyrgyzstan

- Air Manas
- Kyrgyzstan Airlines

Laos

- Lao Aviation

Latvia

- Latavio
- Baltic Express Line

Libya

- Libyan Arab Airlines

North Macedonia

- Avioimpex
- Bosna Air
- Macedonian Air Service
- MAT Macedonian Airlines
- META Aviotransport
- Palair Macedonian

Moldova

- Aerocom
- Air Moldova

Mongolia

- MIAT Mongolian Airlines

Nicaragua

- Aeronica

Nigeria

- Oriental Airlines

Pakistan

- Pakistan International Airlines
- Shaheen Air

Poland

- LOT Polish Airlines

Romania

- TAROM

Russia

- Abakan-Avia
- Aeroflot
- Aero Rent
- Airlines 400
- ALAK (airline)
- ALROSA (airline)
- Aviaenergo
- Avial (airline)
- Aviaprad
- Baikal Airlines
- BAL Bashkirian Airlines
- Bural
- Chernomor Avia
- Continental Airways
- Dalavia
- Donavia
- Enkor
- Gazpromavia
- Jet-2000
- KD Avia
- Kogalymavia (Metrojet)
- KrasAir
- Kuban Airlines
- Mavial Magadan Airlines
- Nordavia
- Omskavia
- Orenair
- Perm Airlines
- Polet Flight
- Pulkovo Aviation Enterprise
- Rossiya
- Russian Sky Airlines
- Sayany Airlines
- S7 Airlines
- Sakha Avia
- Samara Airlines
- Sibaviatrans
- Tatarstan Airlines
- Ural Airlines
- UTair Aviation
- VIM Airlines
- Vladivostok Air
- Vnukovo Airlines
- Yakutia Airlines
- Yamal Airlines

Slovakia

- Slovak Airlines

Somalia

- Air Somalia

Syria

- Syrianair

Tajikistan

- Tajik Air

Turkey

- Active Air
- Greenair
- Sultan Air
- Holiday Airlines

Turkmenistan

- Turkmenistan Airlines

Ukraine

- Air Ukraine
- Odessa Airlines
- BSL Airline

Uzbekistan

- Uzbekistan Airways

Yemen

- Alyemda

==== Former military operators ====
Armenia
Armenian Air Force
Bulgaria
Bulgarian Air Force One 154B retired 1988; one 154M retired April 2010, replaced by A319 CFM
Cuba
Cuban Air Force
Czechoslovakia
Czechoslovak Air Force (passed on to successor states)
Czech Republic
Czech Air Force (replaced by Airbus A319CJ)
East Germany
East German Air Force (2, passed on to FRG in 1990)
Germany
German Air Force (both taken over from East Germany; one lost in 1997 Namibia mid-air collision, the other on display)
Mongolia
Mongolian Air Force
Poland
Polish Air Force – 1 Tu-154M was retired in 2011, 1 Tu-154M crashed in 2010.
Slovakia
Slovak Government Flying Service (replaced by Airbus A319CJ)
Soviet Union
Soviet Air Force (passed on to successor states)
Turkmenistan
Turkmen Air Force – two Tu-154B-2 retired
Ukraine
Ukrainian Air Force
Uzbekistan
Military of Uzbekistan

== Incidents and accidents ==
RA-85185, a Pulkovo Airlines Tu-154 at Heathrow Airport. This Tu-154 would later crash as flight 612 of that airline, killing all 170 people onboard.

Between 1970 and December 2016 there were 110 serious incidents involving the Tu-154, including 73 hull losses, with 2,911 fatalities. Of the fatal incidents, five resulted from terrorist or military terrorist action (two other wartime losses were non-fatal), several from poor runway conditions in winter (including one in which the airplane struck snow plows on the runway), cargo overloading in the lapse of post-Soviet federal safety standards, and mid-air collisions due to faulty air traffic control. Other incidents resulted from mechanical problems, running out of fuel on unscheduled routes, pilot errors (including inadequate flight training for new crews), and cargo fires; several accidents remain unexplained.

On 2 January 2011, Russia's Federal Transport Oversight Agency advised airlines to stop using remaining examples of the Tu-154 (B variant) until the fatal fire incident in Surgut had been investigated. Its operation in Iran ceased in February 2011 due to a number of crashes and incidents involving the type (almost 9% of all Tu-154 losses have occurred in Iran). This grounding compounded the effects of US embargo on civil aircraft parts, substantially decreasing the number of airworthy aircraft in the Iranian civil fleet. In 2010 there were two fatal losses of the Tu-154 due to pilot error and/or weather conditions (a Polish presidential jet attempting a rural airfield landing in heavy fog, the 2010 Polish Air Force Tu-154 crash, and a Russian-registered plane that suffered engine stall after a crew member accidentally de-activated a fuel transfer pump). Following these accidents, in March 2011 the Russian Federal Bureau of Aviation recommended a withdrawal of remaining Tu-154Ms from service.

On 27 December 2016, the Russian Defence Ministry grounded all Tu-154s in Russia pending investigation into the 25 December 2016 Tupolev Tu-154 crash which killed 64 members of the Alexandrov Ensemble, an official Red Army Choir of the Russian Armed Forces.

== Aircraft on display ==
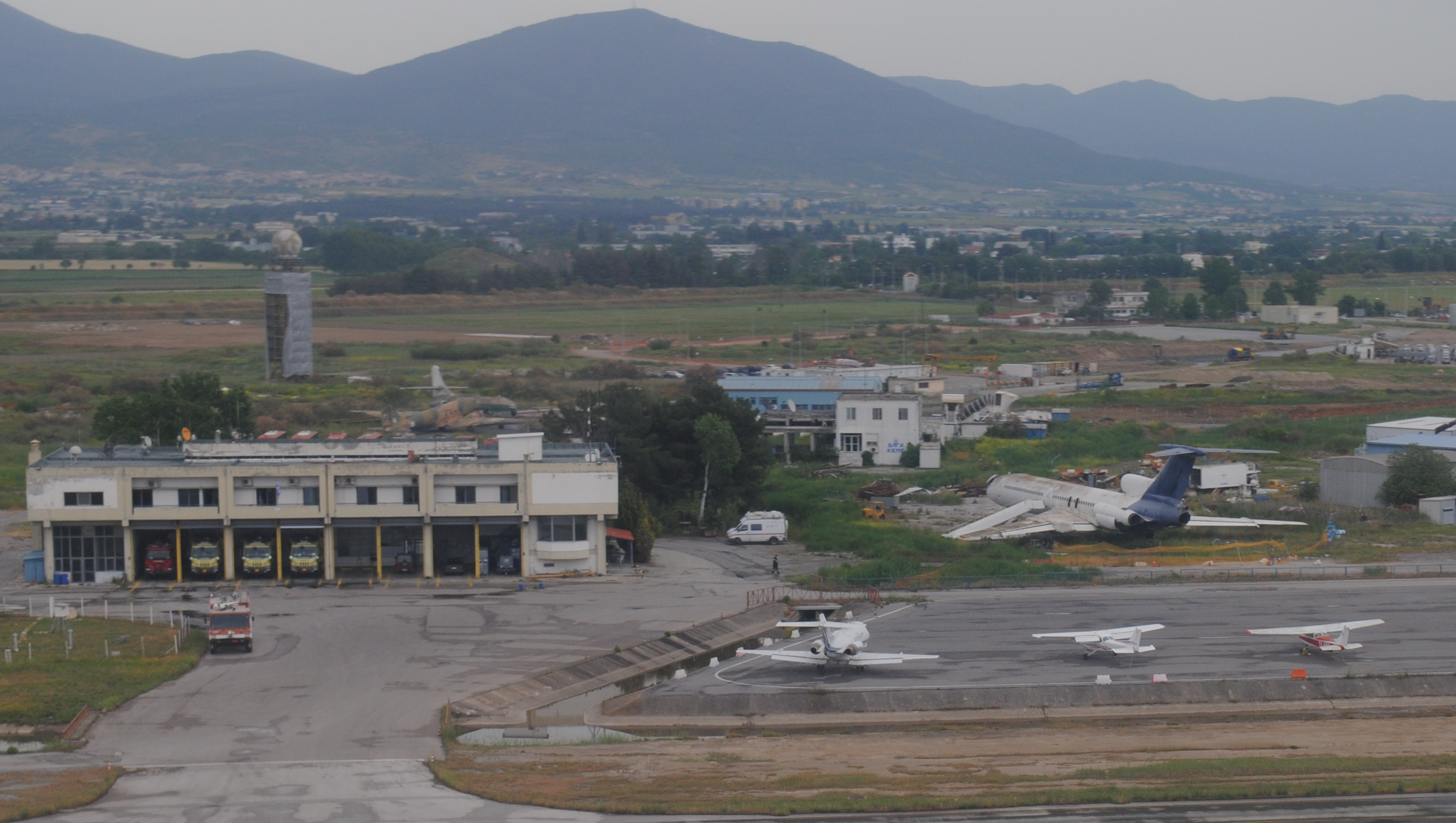
HA-LCR next to the airport fire station at Thessaloniki International Airport, in April 2018

=== Belarus ===
- Tu-154B-2, registration CCCP-85581 (cn 83A581), is permanently preserved and displayed in a retro Aeroflot livery as a gate guard monument at the entrance of Minsk National Airport. The aircraft was previously operated by Aeroflot under its current registration and later by Belavia under the registration EW-85581, before being restored to its current display identity.

=== Bulgaria ===
- Tu-154, registration LZ-BTU, is preserved and on display at the Aviomuseum Burgas in Burgas.

=== China ===
- Tu-154M, registration B-2622, formerly operated by China Northern Airlines, is preserved and on display at the China Science and Technology Museum in Beijing.

=== Czech Republic ===
- Tu-154M, registration OK-BYZ, a former Czech government VIP transport that famously flew the Czech ice hockey team home from their gold medal victory at the 1998 Nagano Winter Olympics, is preserved at the Aviation Museum Kunovice.
- Tu-154M, registration OK-BYA, another former Czech government VIP aircraft, is preserved split into open sections for visitors at the Air Park Zruč near Plzeň.

=== Germany ===
- Tu-154M, registration DDR-SFA, the very first Tu-154M delivered to Interflug, later operated by the German Air Force (Luftwaffe) as 11+02, is preserved and displayed at the Flugausstellung Hermeskeil.

=== Hungary ===
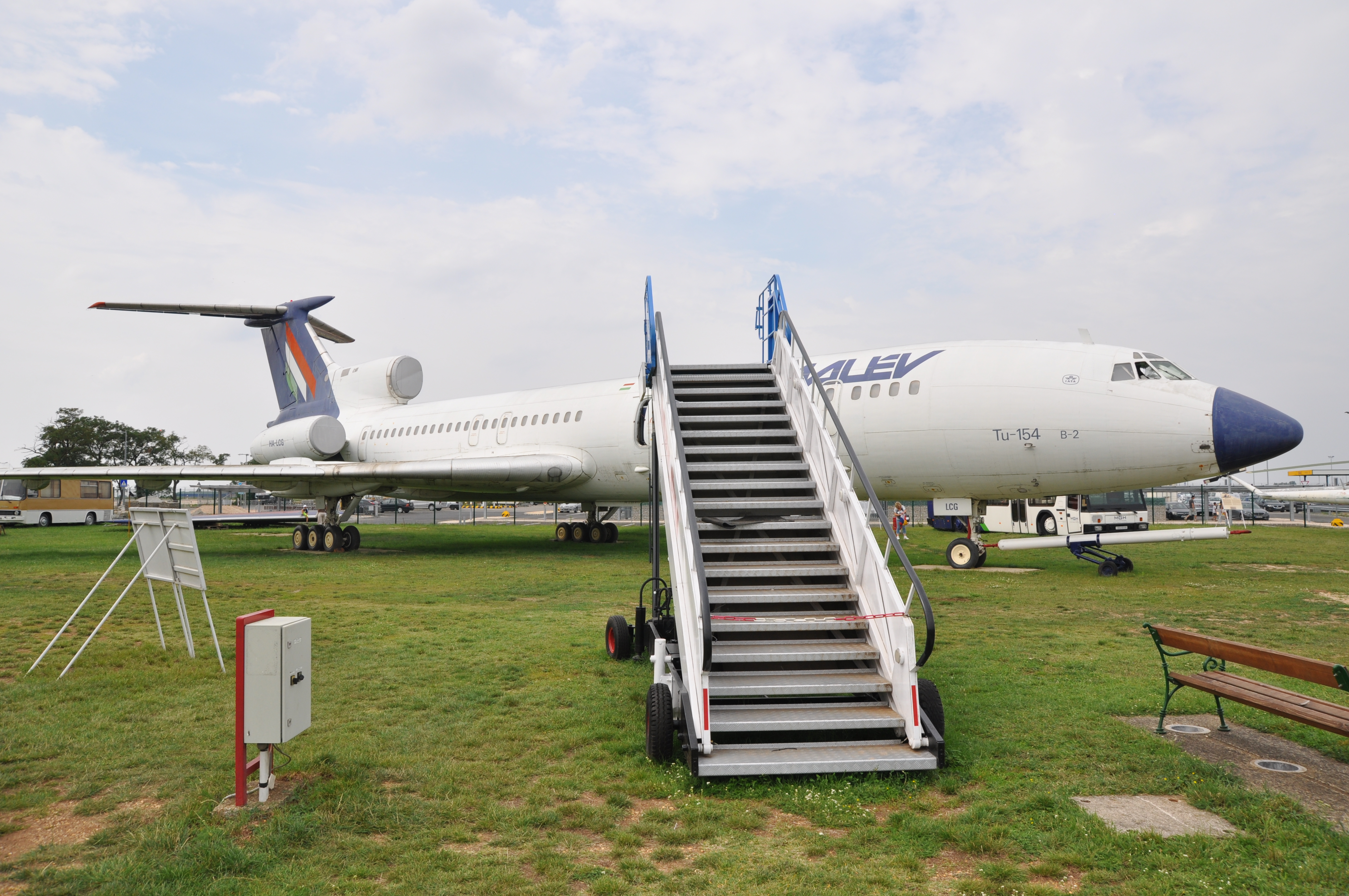
HA-LCG, formerly operated by Malév Hungarian Airlines, is preserved and displayed at the Aeropark museum in Budapest.

- Tu-154B-2, registration HA-LCG, formerly operated by Malév Hungarian Airlines, is preserved and displayed at the Aeropark museum in Budapest.

=== Iran ===
- Tu-154M, registration EP-MCT, formerly operated by Iran Airtour, is preserved and on display as a coastal tourist attraction on the beach of Kish Island.

=== Russia ===
- Tu-154B-2, registration RA-85330, formerly operated by Aeroflot, is preserved as a prominent aviation monument outside Roshchino International Airport in Tyumen.
- Tu-154M, registration RA-85684, the famous "Izhma plane" which made a miraculous emergency landing on an abandoned, overgrown runway in Izhma in 2010 after a total electrical failure, is preserved and on display at the Ulyanovsk Aircraft Museum.
- Tu-154, registration CCCP-85005, an extremely early production prototype version, was previously preserved as an educational aircraft monument inside the VDNKh exhibition center park in Moscow, but was controversially scrapped on site in September 2008.
- Tu-154B, registration RA-85193, is preserved and uniquely integrated as an exhibit inside the Chita Zoo Park in Chita.
- Tu-154M, registration RA-85757, formerly operated by Alrosa, is preserved as a static gate-guard monument outside Tolmachevo Airport in Novosibirsk.
- Tu-154M, registration RA-85119, is preserved as a ground instructional and technical trainer aircraft at the Moscow Aviation Institute.

=== Slovakia ===
- Tu-154M, registration OM-BYO, formerly operated by the Slovak Government Flying Service, is preserved and on display at the Museum of Aviation in Košice.

=== Ukraine ===
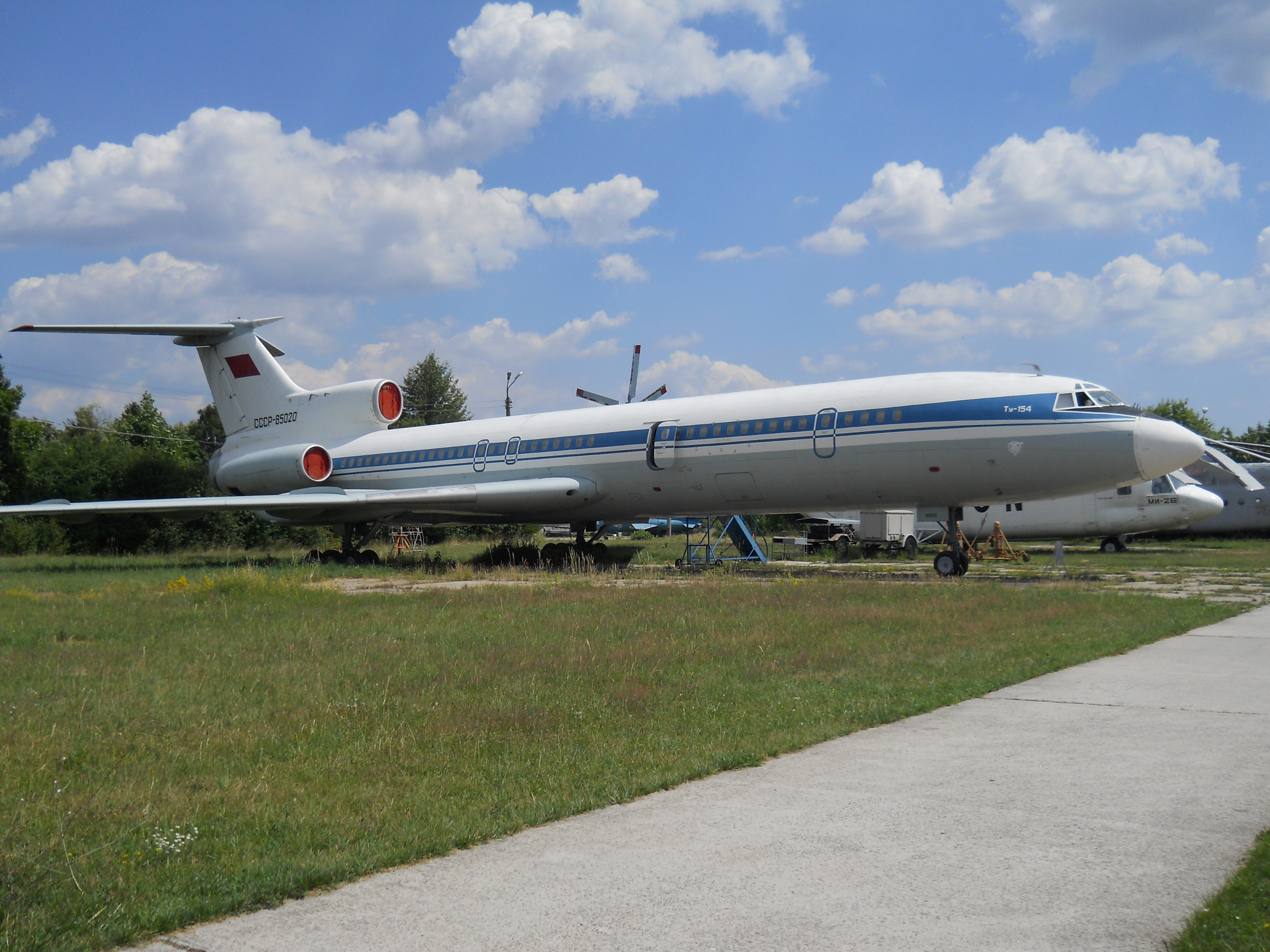
CCCP-85020, an early production model variant in historical retro Aeroflot livery, is preserved at the Ukraine State Aviation Museum.

- Tu-154, registration CCCP-85020, an early production model variant in historical retro Aeroflot livery, is preserved at the Ukraine State Aviation Museum.

== Specifications ==
Measurement	Tu-154B-2	Tu-154M
Cockpit crew	5(Tu-154B)-3(Tu-154M)	
Seating capacity	114–180	
Length	48.0 m (157 ft 6 in)	
Wingspan	37.55 m (123 ft 2 in)	
Wing area	201.45 m^{2} (2,168.4 sq ft)	202 m^{2} (2,170 sq ft)
Height	11.4 m (37 ft 5 in)	
Cabin width	3.58 m (11 ft 9 in)	
MTOW	98,000–100,000 kg (216,000–220,000 lb)	102,000–104,000 kg (225,000–229,000 lb)
Empty weight	50,700 kg (111,800 lb)	55,300 kg (121,900 lb)
Maximum speed	913 km/h (493 kn; 567 mph) (Mach 0.86)	
Range fully loaded	3,460 km (1,870 nmi; 2,150 mi)	3,900 km (2,100 nmi; 2,400 mi)
Range with max fuel	5,280 km (2,850 nmi; 3,280 mi)	6,600 km (3,600 nmi; 4,100 mi)
Service ceiling	12,100 m (39,700 ft)	
Engine (x 3)	Kuznetsov NK-8-2U	Soloviev D-30KU-154
Max. thrust (x 3)	90 kN (20,000 lbf) each	103 kN (23,000 lbf) each
Max. fuel capacity	47,000 L (12,000 US gal; 10,000 imp gal)	49,700 L (13,100 US gal; 10,900 imp gal)

== See also ==
Related development

- Tupolev Tu-155
- Tupolev Tu-204

Aircraft of comparable role, configuration, and era

- Boeing 727
- Hawker Siddeley Trident
- Yakovlev Yak-42

Related lists

- List of civil aircraft
- List of jet airliners
