= Samara Airlines =

Airline based in Samara, Russia

IATA	ICAO	Call sign
E5	BRZ	Beryoza
- Founded: 1961 (founded as Aeroflot, 1992 as Samara Airlines
- Ceased operations: 2008
- Hubs: Kurumoch International Airport
- Alliance: AiRUnion
- Fleet size: 24
- Destinations: 29
- Parent company: State Property Committee (51%)
- Headquarters: Samara, Russia
- Website: http://www.samara-airlines.ru/

Samara Airlines was an airline based in Samara, Russia. It operated scheduled and charter flights from Samara to destinations in Russia and other countries (mainly within the CIS) and charter flights to Austria, Cyprus, Greece, Israel, Spain, Turkey and United Arab Emirates. Its main base was at Kurumoch International Airport (KUF).

Samara Airlines was a member of the Russian AiRUnion alliance.

== History ==
The Kuybyshev Aviation Enterprise was established in 1961 and on this basis 65 Squadron was formed and later transformed into Kuybyshev Joint Aviation Squadron (KuAO), Kuybyshev being the Soviet name of Samara. The privatisation of KuAO in 1993 resulted in the establishment of the Joint Stock Company Samara Airlines. It is owned by the State Property Committee (51%) and private and corporate holdings (49%). The airline used the call-sign "beryoza" (birch tree).

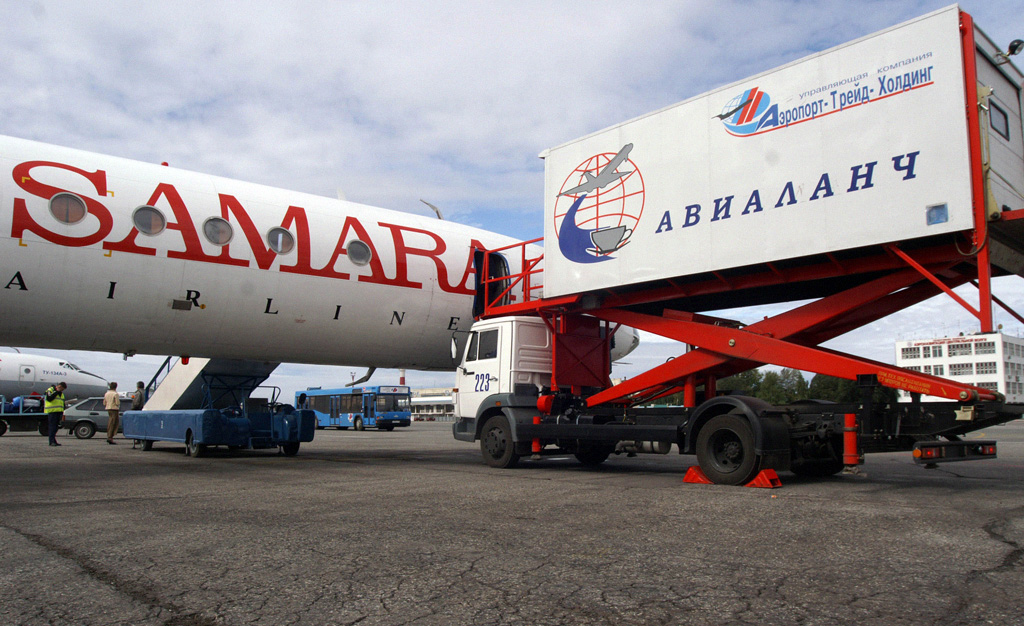
Loading food onto a TU-134A3 at Kurumoch airport in Samara.

It had suspended operations at the end of September 2008 due to the AiRUnion collapse.

== Services ==
As of September 2005, Samara Airlines operated the following services:

- Domestic scheduled destinations: Anapa, Arkhangelsk, Irkutsk, Kazan, Krasnodar, Krasnoyarsk, Mineralnye Vody, Moscow, Nadym, Nizhnevartovsk, Novosibirsk, Novy Urengoy, Noyabrsk, Samara, Sochi, Saint Petersburg and Ufa.
- International scheduled services: Almaty, Baku, Bukhara, Dushanbe, Gyumri, Khujand, Kyiv, Nakhichevan, Shymkent, Simferopol, Tashkent, Thessaloniki, Tianjin and Yerevan.

== Fleet ==
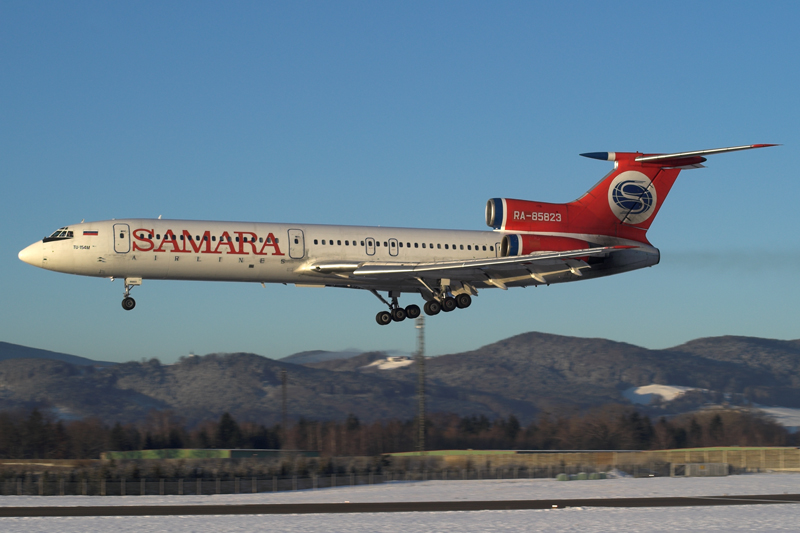
Samara Airlines Tu-154M

The Samara Airlines fleet included the following aircraft (as of May 2008):

Samara Airlines fleet
Aircraft	Total	Passengers	Notes
Ilyushin Il-76TD	2		
Tupolev Tu-134A	6		
Tupolev Tu-154B2	2		
Tupolev Tu-154M	10		
Yakovlev Yak-42	4		
Total	24		
