= Bor, Turukhansky District, Krasnoyarsk Krai =

Bor Бор
- Settlement
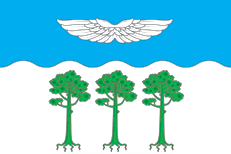
- Flag
- Interactive map of Bor
- Location of Bor Bor (Krasnoyarsk Krai)
- Coordinates: 61°36′N 90°01′E
- Country: Russia
- Federal subject: Krasnoyarsk Krai
- Administrative district: Turukhansky District

Population (2010 Census)
  - Total: 2,496
  - Estimate (2010): 2,496 (0%)
- Time zone: UTC+7 (MSK+4)
- Postal code: 663246
- Dialing code: +7 39110
- OKTMO ID: 04654404101

Bor (Russian: Бор) is a rural locality (a settlement) in Turukhansky District of Krasnoyarsk Krai, Russia, located on the Yenisei River just downstream of its confluence with the Podkamennaya Tunguska.

== Geography ==
Bor stands directly opposite the village of Podkamennaya Tunguska on the other side of the Yenisei River.

== Transportation ==
Bor is served by the Podkamennaya Tunguska Airport.

== Climate ==
Bor has a subarctic climate (Köppen climate classification Dfc). Winters are severely cold with average temperatures from −28.3 to −19.2 °C (−18.9 to −2.6 °F) in January, while summers are warm with average temperatures from +12.0 to +24.8 °C (53.6 to 76.6 °F) in July. Precipitation is moderate and is somewhat higher in summer and autumn than at other times of the year.

Climate data for Bor
Month	Jan	Feb	Mar	Apr	May	Jun	Jul	Aug	Sep	Oct	Nov	Dec	Year
Record high °C (°F)	1.6 (34.9)	4.4 (39.9)	14.5 (58.1)	24.9 (76.8)	33.6 (92.5)	35.0 (95.0)	36.4 (97.5)	33.5 (92.3)	29.4 (84.9)	21.6 (70.9)	7.2 (45.0)	3.6 (38.5)	36.4 (97.5)
Mean daily maximum °C (°F)	−18.9 (−2.0)	−13.8 (7.2)	−3.3 (26.1)	4.9 (40.8)	12.4 (54.3)	22.0 (71.6)	24.9 (76.8)	20.2 (68.4)	11.7 (53.1)	1.6 (34.9)	−10.9 (12.4)	−17.5 (0.5)	2.8 (37.0)
Daily mean °C (°F)	−23.3 (−9.9)	−19.2 (−2.6)	−9.6 (14.7)	−1.3 (29.7)	5.9 (42.6)	15.2 (59.4)	18.3 (64.9)	14.3 (57.7)	7.0 (44.6)	−1.6 (29.1)	−14.6 (5.7)	−21.5 (−6.7)	−2.5 (27.4)
Mean daily minimum °C (°F)	−27.6 (−17.7)	−24.1 (−11.4)	−15.5 (4.1)	−6.9 (19.6)	0.2 (32.4)	8.7 (47.7)	12.3 (54.1)	9.4 (48.9)	3.3 (37.9)	−4.4 (24.1)	−18.3 (−0.9)	−25.6 (−14.1)	−7.4 (18.7)
Record low °C (°F)	−56.0 (−68.8)	−52.9 (−63.2)	−45.1 (−49.2)	−36.6 (−33.9)	−22.5 (−8.5)	−7.0 (19.4)	0.7 (33.3)	−3.7 (25.3)	−11.8 (10.8)	−32.4 (−26.3)	−52.7 (−62.9)	−54.3 (−65.7)	−56.0 (−68.8)
Average precipitation mm (inches)	39 (1.5)	29 (1.1)	26 (1.0)	32 (1.3)	47 (1.9)	58 (2.3)	64 (2.5)	70 (2.8)	65 (2.6)	62 (2.4)	55 (2.2)	47 (1.9)	594 (23.5)
Average snowfall cm (inches)	75 (30)	86 (34)	89 (35)	68 (27)	12 (4.7)	0.1 (0.0)	0 (0)	0 (0)	1 (0.4)	5 (2.0)	29 (11)	54 (21)	419.1 (165.1)
Average rainy days	0.1	0.1	1	8	16	18	16	17	15	12	2	0.2	105.4
Average snowy days	26	23	19	11	3	0.1	0	0	1	13	24	27	147.1
Average relative humidity (%)	80	79	73	65	64	67	71	78	82	83	84	81	76
Mean monthly sunshine hours	26	83	152	201	225	269	299	207	108	55	32	11	1,668
Source 1: pogoda.ru.net
Source 2: NOAA (sun only, 1961-1990)
