= Baykit Airport =

Airport in Baykit, Krasnoyarsk Krai, Russia

Baykit Airport Аэропорт Байкит
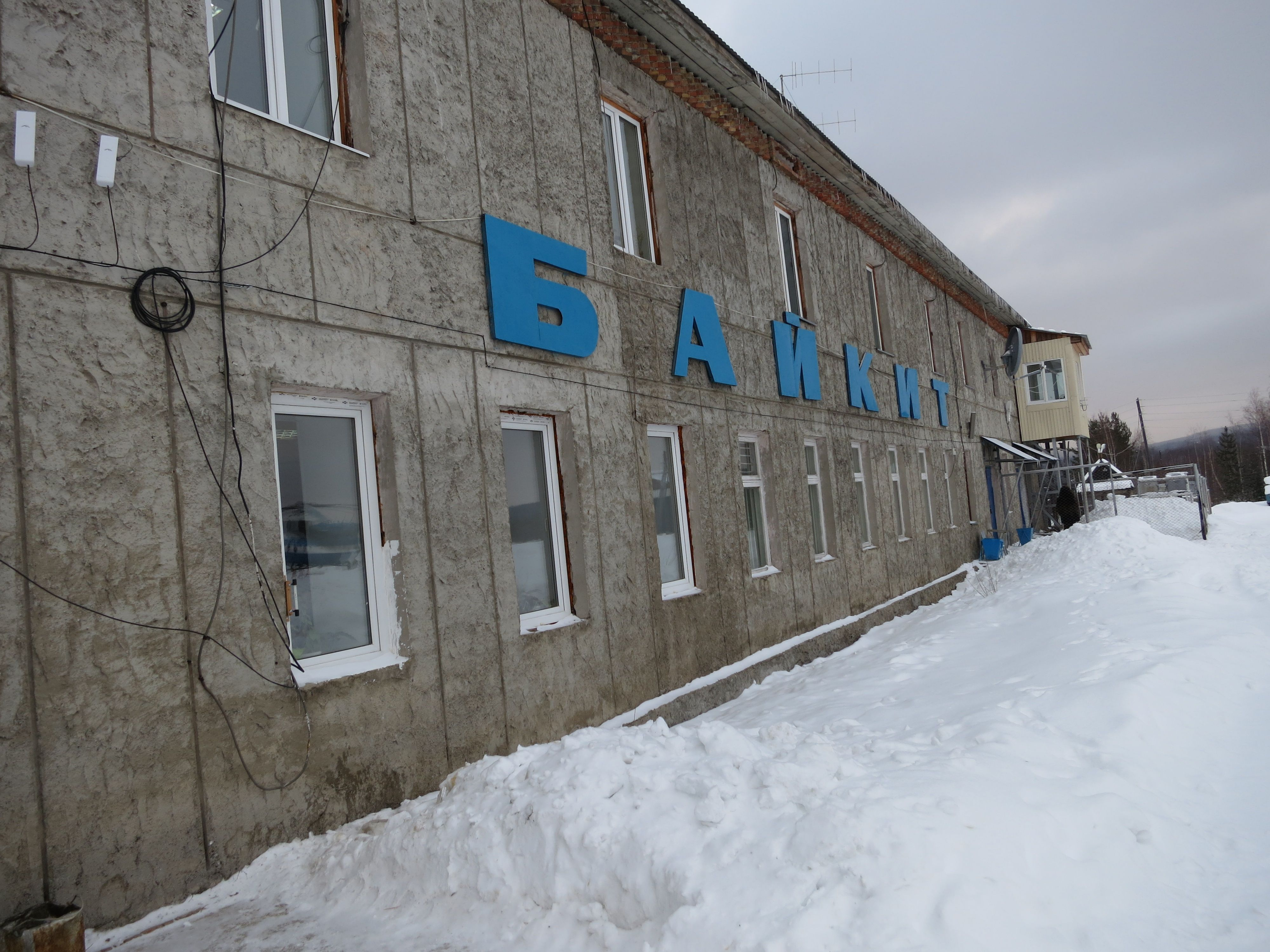
- IATA: BKA; ICAO: UNIB

Summary
- Airport type: Public
- Serves: Baykit
- Location: Baykit, Russia
- Elevation AMSL: 853 ft (260 m)
- Coordinates: 61°40′36″N 96°21′18″E
- Interactive map of Baykit Airport

Runways
Direction	Length		Surface
Direction	ft	m	Surface
07/25	5,381	1,640	Concrete

Baykit Airport (Russian: Аэропорт Байкит) (IATA: BKA, ICAO: UNIB) is an airport in Krasnoyarsk Krai, Russia located 1 km (0.62 mi) west of Baykit. It is a major utilitarian transport airfield.

== Airlines and destinations ==
Airlines	Destinations
IrAero	Irkutsk
KrasAvia	Novosibirsk
NordStar	Krasnoyarsk–Yemelyanovo

== See also ==
- List of airports in Russia
