= Domodedovsky District =

Coordinates: 55°26′N 37°45′E

Domodedovsky District in Moscow Oblast (2010)

Domodedovsky District (Russian: Домоде́довский райо́н) was an administrative district (raion) of Moscow Oblast, Russia, which was municipally incorporated as Domodedovo Urban Okrug. Its administrative center was the town of Domodedovo. District's population: 135,405 (2010 Census); 124,572 (2002 Census); 68,538 (1989 Soviet census). The population of Domodedovo accounted for 71.0% of the district's total population.

== History ==
The district was established on April 29, 1969, when its territory was split from Podolsky District. It was abolished on April 1, 2011, with its territory re-organized as the Domodedovo Town Under Oblast Jurisdiction; the municipal status as the urban okrug was unaffected.
