= Baykit =

Baykit Байкит
- Selo
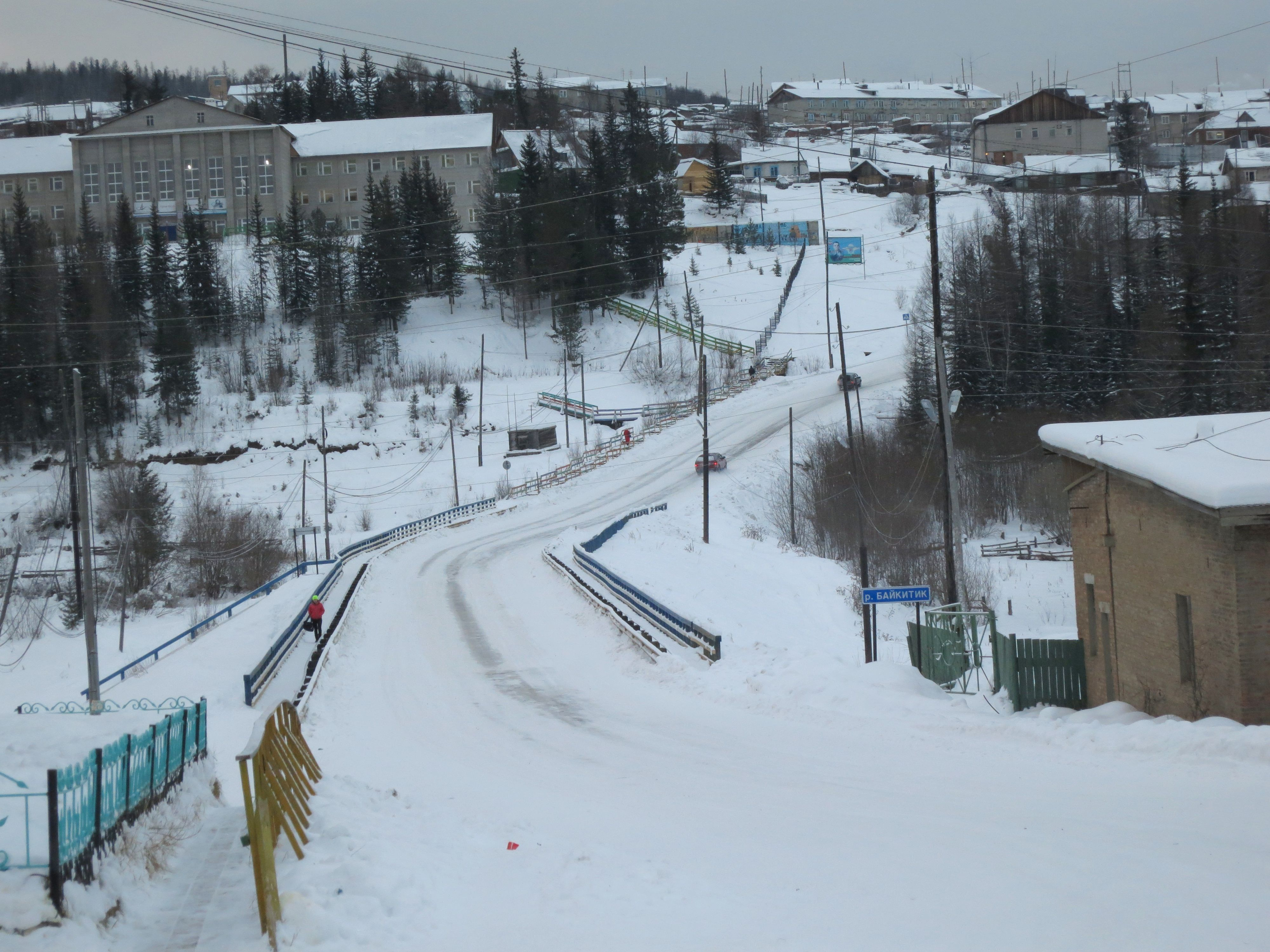
- Interactive map of Baykit
- Location of Baykit Baykit (Krasnoyarsk Krai)
- Coordinates: 61°40′N 96°22′E
- Country: Russia
- Federal subject: Krasnoyarsk Krai
- Administrative district: Evenkiysky District
- Founded: 1927
- Elevation: 167 m (548 ft)

Population (2010 Census)
  - Total: 3,513
  - Estimate (2025): 2,836 (−19.3%)
- Time zone: UTC+7 (MSK+4)
- Postal code: 648360
- OKTMO ID: 04650405101

Baykit (Russian: Байки́т) is a rural locality in Evenkiysky District of Krasnoyarsk Krai, Russia, located on the Podkamennaya Tunguska River. Population: 3,513 (2010 census); 4,018 (2002 census); 4,988 (1989 Soviet census).

== Local government ==
Baykit Rural Council of Deputies of the VI convocation

Date of election: 17/04/2022. Term of office: 5 years. Number of deputies: 10.

- Chairman of the Village Council of Deputies Artur Shmygov.

Faction	Number of deputies
United Russia	8
Liberal Democratic Party	1
Independent	1

Head of the village

- Inna Skrebtsova. Date of election: 11/04/2019. Term of office: 5 years.

Village leaders

- Lyudmila Todosko, head of administration from 2001 to 2005.
- Nikolay Bryukhanov, chairman of the village council from 2002 to 2018 and head of the village from 2005 to 2019.
- Evgeniy Chicherin, head of administration from 2005 to 2008.
- Natalya Bunits, head of administration from 2008 to 2015.
- Alexander Simbirtsev, head of administration from 2015 to 2018.
- Irina Lobanova, chairman of the village council from 2019 to 2022.

== Transportation ==
Baykit is served by the Baykit Airport.

== Climate ==
Baykit has a subarctic climate (Köppen climate classification Dfc) with bitterly cold winters and warm summers. Precipitation is moderate and is heavier in summer and fall than during other seasons.

Climate data for Baykit
Month	Jan	Feb	Mar	Apr	May	Jun	Jul	Aug	Sep	Oct	Nov	Dec	Year
Record high °C (°F)	.1 (32.2)	.8 (33.4)	12.3 (54.1)	21.4 (70.5)	32.1 (89.8)	36.4 (97.5)	36.3 (97.3)	33.4 (92.1)	26.7 (80.1)	19.4 (66.9)	5.5 (41.9)	3.7 (38.7)	36.4 (97.5)
Daily mean °C (°F)	−30.8 (−23.4)	−26.8 (−16.2)	−14.3 (6.3)	−4.5 (23.9)	3.8 (38.8)	12.6 (54.7)	17.0 (62.6)	12.7 (54.9)	5.4 (41.7)	−5.5 (22.1)	−18.9 (−2.0)	−28.2 (−18.8)	−6.5 (20.4)
Record low °C (°F)	−55.9 (−68.6)	−55.2 (−67.4)	−45.8 (−50.4)	−36.1 (−33.0)	−23.4 (−10.1)	−7.6 (18.3)	−2.1 (28.2)	−4.2 (24.4)	−14.1 (6.6)	−35.3 (−31.5)	−54.3 (−65.7)	−56.5 (−69.7)	−56.5 (−69.7)
Average precipitation mm (inches)	27.7 (1.09)	19.8 (0.78)	21.3 (0.84)	27.1 (1.07)	42.4 (1.67)	50.3 (1.98)	53.0 (2.09)	83.2 (3.28)	59.0 (2.32)	50.6 (1.99)	49.5 (1.95)	34.1 (1.34)	518 (20.4)
Average precipitation days (≥ 1.0 mm)	10.1	6.8	6.5	6.7	9.0	9.4	8.0	11.6	10.7	12.6	13.2	11.3	115.9
Mean monthly sunshine hours	32	96	166	215	236	266	289	186	115	66	44	15	1,726
Source 1: NOAA (1961-1990)
Source 2: records:
