= Motygino =

Motygino (Russian: Мотыгино) is the name of several inhabited localities in Russia.

Urban localities

- Motygino, Krasnoyarsk Krai, a work settlement in Motyginsky District of Krasnoyarsk Krai

Rural localities

- Motygino, Pskov Oblast, a village in Sebezhsky District of Pskov Oblast
- Motygino, Yaroslavl Oblast, a village in Yermakovsky Rural Okrug of Lyubimsky District of Yaroslavl Oblast
