= Turukhansk Airport =

Airport in Krasnoyarsk Krai, Russia

Turukhansk
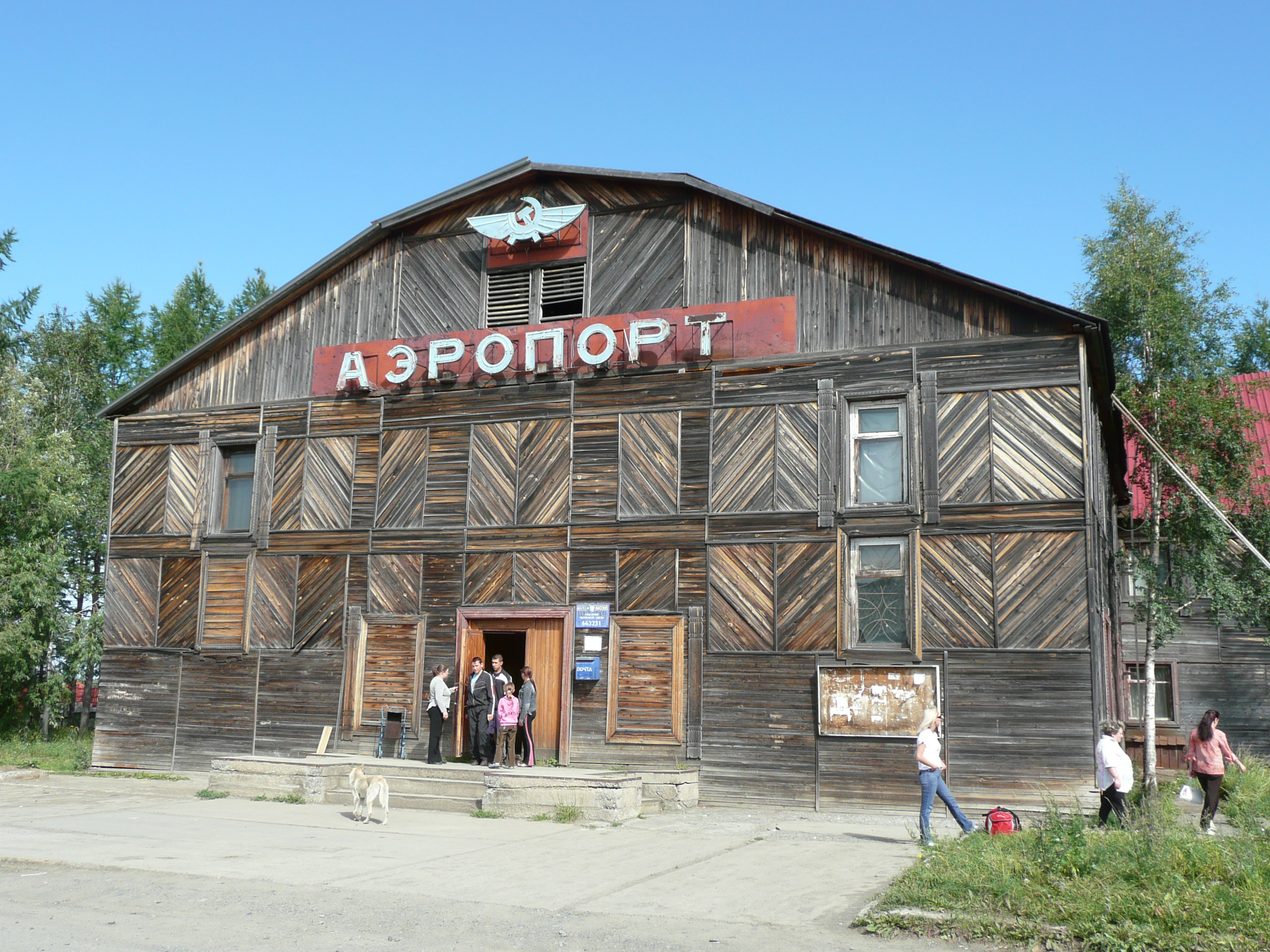
- The building of the airport before reconstruction in 2014
- IATA: THX; ICAO: UOTT

Summary
- Airport type: Public
- Serves: Turukhansk
- Location: Turukhansk, Russia
- Elevation AMSL: 128 ft / 39 m
- Coordinates: 65°48′0″N 87°55′48″E

Map
- Location of airport in Krasnoyarsk Krai

Runways
Direction	Length		Surface
Direction	ft	m	Surface
13/31	5,906	1,800	Concrete

Turukhansk Airport (IATA: THX, ICAO: UOTT) is an airport in Krasnoyarsk Krai, Russia located 2 km west of Turukhansk. It accommodates medium-size airliners. Reconstructed in 2014.

== Airlines and destinations ==
Airlines	Destinations
KrasAvia	Podkamennaya Tunguska
NordStar	Krasnoyarsk–Yemelyanovo
Utair	Igarka, Tyumen

== See also ==
- List of airports in Russia

== Sources ==
- RussianAirFields.com
