= Podkamennaya Tunguska Airport =

Airport in Krasnoyarsk Krai, Russia

Podkamennaya Tunguska Airport Aeroport "Podkamennaya Tunguska"
- IATA: TGP; ICAO: UNIP

Summary
- Airport type: public
- Serves: Bor
- Elevation AMSL: 213 ft / 65 m
- Coordinates: 61°35′24″N 89°58′24″E
- Interactive map of Podkamennaya Tunguska Airport

Runways
Direction	Length		Surface
Direction	ft	m	Surface
04/22	5,249	1,600	Concrete

Podkamennaya Tunguska Airport (Russian: Аэропорт Подкаменная Тунгуска) (IATA: TGP, ICAO: UNIP) is an airport serving the Podkamennaya Tunguska and Bor villages in Turukhansky District, Krasnoyarsk Krai, Russia.

== Airlines and destinations ==
Airlines	Destinations
KrasAvia	Krasnoyarsk–Cheremshanka, Turukhansk

== See also ==
- List of airports in Russia
