= List of defunct airlines of Russia =

This is a list of defunct airlines of Russia.

Airline	Image	IATA	ICAO	Callsign	Commenced operations	Ceased operations	Notes
2nd Sverdlovsk Air Enterprise			UKU	PYSHMA	1993	2011	
61 Vozdushnaya Armiya					1998	2009	Rebranded as Voyennaya Transportnaya Aviatsiya
Aviaprima		J5	PRL		1993	1999	Merged with Aerolat and Chernomor-Union to form Chernomor-Avia
Adygea Airlines			MKP		1997	2005	
Aero Rent		PC	NRO	AEROMASTER	1995	2011	
Aeroflot-Cargo		SU	RCF	AEROFLOT CARGO	2005	2009	Rolled back into Aeroflot
Aeroflot-Don		D9	DNV		2000	2009	Reverted to Donavia
Aeroflot-Nord		5N	AVL	DVINA	2004	2009	Rebranded as Nordavia
Aeroflot-Plus		P3	PLS	AEROPLUS	1992	2010	Rebranded as Jetalliance East
Aerofreight Airlines		RS	FRT		1997	2003	
Aerokuzbass			NKZ		1999	2006	Shut down after management was caught smuggling goods to Iran
Aerotex Airlines					1999	2013	Rebranded as RusLine
AeroVolga			VOG		1993	1999	Merged into Samara Airlines
Air Bashkortostan		ZU	BBT	AGYDAL	2006	2013	
Air Samara					2010	2014	
AiRUnion					2005	2008	
Air Volga		G6	WLG	GOUMRAK	2008	2010	Acquired by RusLine, name used for RusLine's regional flights
Airlines 400			VAZ		1999	2007	Rebranded as Red Wings Airlines
Airstars		PL	ASE	MOROZOV	1997	2011	
Airstan					1994	2002	
Ak Bars Aero		2B	BGM	BUGAVIA	2010	2015	
Artel Staratelei "Amur" Airlines							
AIS Airlines			AIS		1992	1999	
AJT Air International		E9	TRJ		1992	2003	
Ak Bars Aero		2B	BGM	BUGAVIA	2010	2015	
ALAK					1991	1999	
Alania Airlines		2D	OST	ALANIA	1996	2009	Acquired by VIM Airlines
Airlines of Kuban		GW	KIL		2004	2010	Rebranded as Kuban Airlines
Alliance Avia			NZP		2000	2006	
Alpha Airlines					2004	2006	
Alrosa-Avia			LRO	ALROSA	1993	2008	
Amur Airlines					2007	2010	
Angara Airlines		2G	477	AGU	2000	2025	
Arkhangelsk Airlines					1991	2004	Rebranded as Aeroflot-Nord
Astair		ZA	SUW		1998	2005	Rebranded as Interavia Airlines
Astrakhan Airlines		OB	ASZ	Air Astrakhan	1994	2005	
Atlant-Soyuz Airlines		7B	AYZ	ATLANT-SOYUZ	1993	2010	Rebranded as Moscow Airlines
Atruvera Aviation			AUV	Atruvera	1992	2006	
Aviaarktika					1930	1960	Absorbed into Aeroflot
Aviaenergo		7U	ERG	AVIAENERGO	1993	2011	
Aviaexpresscruise		E6	BKS		1993	2004	
Aviakultura					1922	1922	
Avial NV			NVI	NEW AVIAL	1991	2011	
Avianova		AO	NET	NOVA	2009	2011	
Aviapanh					1991	2011	
Aviaprad		WR	VID	AVIAPRAD	1996	2008	
Aviast Air					1992	2009	
Avis Amur					2004	2011	Operations suspended following crash
Baikal Airlines		X3	BKL		1992	2002	Absorbed into Siberia Airlines
BAL Bashkirian Airlines		V9	BTC	BASHKIRIAN	1991	2007	
Belgorod Air Enterprise			BED	BELGORYE	1995	2005	
Bugulma Air Enterprise			BGM		1995	2010	Rebranded as Ak Bars Aero
Bural		BU	BUN	BURAL	1993	2017	Shut down due to aircraft maintenance law violations
Bylina			BYL	BYLINA	1992	2014	
Bryansk Air Enterprise			BRK	Bravia			
Center-South		DF	CTS	CENTER-SOUTH	1993	2015	Shut down following failed inspection
Centre-Avia		J7	CVC	AVIACENTRE	1991	2010	
Chelyabinsk Air Enterprise		H6	CHB		1992	2004	Absorbed into S7 Airlines
Cheremshanka Airlines (Cherline)						1996	
Chernomor-Avia			CMK	Cheravia	1994	2005	
Chitaavia		X7	CHF	Chita	1991	2006	Acquired by VIM Airlines
Chuvashia Airlines			CBK		1993	2005	
Citrus		XT	CTU	CITY WINGS	2021	2022	Plans for the new airline suspended due to sanctions against Russia.
Continental Airways		PC	PVV	CONTAIR	1995	2011	
Continent		LK	CNE	CONTINENT	2009	2011	
Dagestan Airlines		N2	DAG	DAGAL	1994	2009	Rebranded as South East Airlines
Dalavia		H8	KHB	DALAVIA	1998	2008	
Dalstroy Aviation					1946	1957	Ceased operations in 1957 with the disbandment of Dalstroy
Dauria					1998	2011	
Deruluft					1922	1937	German-Soviet joint airline
Dobrolet Airlines		G2	DOB	DOBROLET	1992	2007	
Dobrolet		QD	DOB	DOBROLET	2013	2014	Shut down due to European Union sanctions in the wake of the shootdown of Malaysia Airlines Flight 17
Dobrolyot					1923	1930	
Domodedovo Airlines		E3	DMO	DOMODEDOVO	1992	2008	
Donavia		D9	DNV	DONAVIA	1993	2000	Rebranded as Aeroflot-Don
Donavia		D9	DNV	DONAVIA	2000	2016	Merged into Rossiya
East Line Airlines					1996	2004	Rebranded as Russian Sky Airlines
Elbrus-Avia			NLK		1998	2009	
Enkor		H6	ENK	Enkor	1997	2005	Merged into Siberia Airlines
Eurasia Air		UH	EUS		1997	2003	
Far East Avia		H8			1953	2008	Rebranded as Dalavia
Far Eastern Airline					2013	2013	Rebranded as Taiga Airline
Far Eastern Cargo Airlines			FEW		1993	2000	
Flight						2003	
Globus Airlines		GH	GLP	GLOBUS	2007	2019	Merged into S7 Airlines
Grizodubova Airline							
Gromov Air			GAI		1995	2006	Rebranded as Moskovia Airlines
Hamiata							Sino-Russian joint airline
Ilavia			ILV	Ilavia	1994	2006	
Ilin Air Company						2011	
Interavia Airlines		ZA	SUW	INTERAVIA	2005	2008	
Irkutskavia					2003	2011	Merged into Angara Airlines
Iron Dragonfly		F7	IDF		1993	2003	
IRS Aero		5R	LDF		1994	2003	Shut down following crash
Jet Air Group			JSI		2006	2009	Rebranded as PremierAvia
Junkers Luftverkehr Russia					1923	1924	
Kaliningradavia		KD	KNI	KALININGRAD AIR	1976	2005	Rebranded as KD Avia
KAPO Avia		G7	KAO	KAZAVIA	2001	2015	
Karat		V2	AKT	Aviakarat	1993	2007	
Katekavia		ZF	KTK	Katekavia	1995	2015	Rebranded as Azur Air
Kavminvodyavia (KMV Avia)		KV	MVD	AIR MINVODY	1995	2011	
KD Avia		KD	KNI	KALININGRAD AIR	2005	2009	
Khantyavia							
Khakasia Airlines			BKN		1993	2003	Merged into Vladivostok Air
Kirov Air Enterprise			KTA		1992	2012	
KNG Transavia			CGT		1994	2009	
Kolavia					1993	2012	Rebranded as Metrojet
Komiavia					1991	1997	
Komiinteravia		8J	KMV	KOMIINTER	1996	2006	Rebranded as UTair Express
Korsar					1991	1999	
Koryak Air Enterprise					1956	2010	Merged into Petropavlovsk-Kamchatsky Air Enterprise
KrasAir		7B	KJC	KRASNOYARSK AIR	1993	2008	
Krylo Airlines		K9	KRI	KRYLO	1991	2003	
Kuban Airlines		GW	KIL	AIR KUBAN	2010	2012	Went bankrupt
Magas			KCM		2007	2009	
MAVIAL Magadan Airlines		H5	MVL	MAVIAL	1992	2006	
Metrojet		7K	KGL	KOGALYM	2012	2015	Went bankrupt following the destruction of Metrojet Flight 9268
Mordovia Airlines					1992	2013	Shut down due to safety violations
Moscow Airlines		7B	MOA	MOSCOW AIRLINES	2010	2011	
Moscow Airways		M8	MSC	AIR MOSCOW	1991	1996	Ceased operations following crash
Moskovia Airlines		3R	GAI	GROMOV AIRLINE	2006	2014	
Murmansk Air Company						2009	
Murmansk Airlines			MNK		1993	2001	
Nefteyugansk United Airline Transportati				NFT	1975	2013	Rebranded as UTair Helicopter Services
Nikolaevsk-Na-Amure Air Enterprise					1992		
Northwest Air Base					1974	2014	
Novgorodavia					1994	2006	
Novosibirsk Air Enterprise			NBE	NAKAIR	1995	2011	
Omskavia		N3	OMS	OMSK	1994	2008	
Orel Avia		R6	UVL		1991	1997	Merged into Vnukovo Airlines
Orenair		R2	ORB	ORENBURG	2006	2016	Merged into Rossiya Airlines
Orenburg Airlines		R2	ORB		1993	2006	Rebranded as Orenair
Orient Avia		V6	ORT		1994	1997	
PANH		PA	PAN	PANH	2013	2016	Fall in demand
Perm Airlines		P9	PGP	PERM AIR	1995	2008	
Polet Flight		YQ	POT	POLET	1989	2014	
Polyarnya Aviatsiya					1932	1960	Absorbed into Aeroflot
Primair			PMM		1998	2005	
Pulkovo Aviation Enterprise		FV	PLK	Pulkovo	1995	2006	Merged into Rossiya Airlines
RDS Avia					1993	1994	
Region Avia		L3			2005	2011	
Remex					1997	2001	
Rosneft-Baltika					1997	2007	
Russ Air Transport Company					1999	2001	
Russian Post Airlines					2004	2006	
Russian Sky Airlines		P7	ESL	RADUGA	2004	2014	Went bankrupt
Ryazanaviatrans			RYZ	RYAZAN	1995	2011	
S-Air			RLS		1998	2009	AOC Revoked Following Crash
Sakha Avia		K7	IKT	SAKHAAVIA	1993	2003	Rebranded as Yakutia Airlines
Samara Airlines		E5	BRZ	BERYOZA	1993	2008	
Saravia		6W	SOV		1995	2013	Rebranded as Saratov Airlines
Saratov Airlines		6W	SOV	SARATOV AIR	2013	2018	AOC revoked following crash
SAT Airlines		HZ	SHU	SATAIR	1992	2013	Merged with Vladivostok Air to form Aurora
Saturn Aviakompania			RMO		2001	2009	
Sayany Airlines			NVI	UIIISYL	1998	2002	The airline was based in Irkutsk and Chita.
ShaNS Air			SNF		1993	2007	
Sibaviatrans		5M	SIB	Sibavia	1995	2008	
Siberian Airlines		S7	SBI		1992	1996	Rebranded as S7 Airlines
Siblyot							
Sirair							
Sir Aero			SRN		1995	2007	
Skol Airlines			CDV	SKOL	2000	2022	Went bankrupt
Sky Express		XW	SXR	SKYSTORM	2006	2011	Acquired by Kuban Airlines
Skynet					2010	2013	
South East Airlines		N2	DAG		2009	2011	AOC revoked following crash
Spark+					1998	2006	
Specavia Air Company					1997	2006	
Surgut Avia					1993	1994	Merged into Tyumenaviatrans Aviation
Stigl				STIGL	1992	1996	Flag carrier of the Chechen Republic of Ichkeria
Tambov-Avia					1993	2009	
Tatarstan Airlines		U9	TAK	TATARSTAN	2000	2013	AOC revoked following crash
Tatneftaero					1997	2010	
TESIS Aviation Enterprise		UZ	TIS	TESIS	1992	2008	
Titan Cargo			TIT		1995	2000	
Tomsk Avia			TSK	TOMSK-AVIA	1992	2015	
Touch and Go Airlines		EC	TUG		1993	1995	
Trans-Charter Airlines		FZ	TCH		1994	1999	
Transaero		UN	TSO	TRANSOVIET	1991	2015	Went bankrupt
Transair-Gyraintiee			KTS	KOTAIR	1996	2010	
Transaviatsiya					1930	1932	
Transeuropean Airlines		UE	TEP	TRANSEURLINE	1996	2001	
Tretyakovo Air Transport			TKO		1997	2002	
Tulpar Air			TUL		1991	2014	Grounded following failed inspection
Tuva Airlines				AIR TYVA	1992	2016	Went bankrupt
Tyumenaviatrans Aviation		7M	TYM		1992	2003	Rebranded as UTair Aviation
Uraiavia			URV	URAI	1993	2011	
Uralinteravia		U3	URA		1992	1996	
UTair Aviation		UT	UTA	UTAIR	1991	2017	Rebranded as Utair
UTair Express		UR	UTX		2006	2015	
VASO Airlines		2Z	VSO		1993	2007	
VIM Airlines		NN	MOV	MOV AIR	2000	2017	
VIM-Aviaservice					2004	2008	
Vladikavkaz Air Enterprise			OSV		1995	1999	
Vladivostok Air		XF	VLK	VLADAIR	1994	2014	Merged with SAT Airlines to form Aurora
Vnukovo Airlines		V5	VKO	VNUKOVO	1994	2001	Merged into Siberian Airlines
Volga-Aviaexpress		G6	WLG		1992	2008	Rebranded as Air Volga
Voronezhavia		ZT	VRN	VORONEZHAVIA	1994	2009	Taken over by Polet Flight
Vyborg			VBG		2002	2010	Rebranded as Solaris Airlines
Yak-Service			AKY	YAK-SERVICE	1993	2011	AOC revoked following crash
Yakutsk Airlines			KUT		1999	2003	Merged into Yakutia Airlines
Zapolyariye Airlines			PZY	ZAPOLOYAR	2007	2010	
Zonalnoye Air Enterprise		DF			1992	2017	

== See also ==
- List of airlines of Russia
- List of airports in Russia
