= Arkaim (airline) =

Russian airline

IATA	ICAO	Call sign
-	-	-
- Founded: 2010
- Commenced operations: 2016
- Headquarters: Ufa, Bashkortostan, Russia

Arkaim, LLC (Russian: ООО "Аркаим", Bashkir: "Арҡайым" ЯCЙ) is a regional Russian airline based in Ufa, Bashkortostan. As of July 2010, it operates passenger flights from Ufa to Ekaterinburg (Koltsovo Airport), Nizhniy Novgorod (Strigino Airport) and Sibay, a town in SE Bashkortostan. In the future, the airline plans to operate a flight to Neftekamsk, also in Bashkortostan.

It plans to lease or purchase 7 Boeing or Airbus aircraft.

== History ==
The company, named after Arkaim, an ancient settlement in the South Urals, was registered on 19 April 2009 by former deputy general director of Ufa International Airport Nikolay Ogedov with registered capital of 10 thousand rubles. Until 2002, Ogedov was general director of BAL Bashkirian Airlines, but was forced to resign in the aftermath of the midair collision of a BAL Tu-154 over Germany. A decree on the development of the air transport industry for 2009 –2020 signed by the President of Bashkortostan in May 2009 allocated some 30 billion rubles for investment in the industry, with 5 billion rubles being earmarked for the creation of the airline, which according to Salavat Kutushev, the General Director of Ufa International Airport, will create 700 jobs.

The company which was incorporated on 19 April 2009 is intended to take over as the national airline of Bashkortostan from BAL Bashkirian Airlines, which was liquidated in 2005, and will operate routes flown by the former airline, in particular from Ufa International Airport to Moscow. After the liquidation of BAL, the government of Bashkortostan was to take a 26% stake in Air Bashkortostan, but the deal never eventuated due to the lack of funds in the local budget. Air Bashkortostan, which is now 100% owned by VIM Airlines, has not operated flights from Ufa since 2008, instead its four Boeing 757s operate in Iran and on charter flights for its parent company. Expected to begin operations by the end of 2009, the airline also expects to add flights on local routes from Ufa to Neftekamsk and Sibay, possibly utilising Let L-410 Turbolet-sized aircraft.

According to Kommersant, industry experts and competitors do not give the airline a chance at success, due to intensive competition on trunk routes, and the lack of a regional air travel market in Bashkortostan. Andrei Martirosov, the general director of UTair Aviation, does not believe that there is available US$500 million in Russia with which to build a network airline and also stated that he is not afraid of competition from the potential start-up airline. Sources of Kommersant at Ufa International Airport believe that the airline would not stand much of a chance on the Moscow sector due to competition from incumbent airlines. Boris Rybak, the general director of Infomost believes that regional aviation in Bashkortostan is still in its infancy, and passenger traffic from Ufa is small.
