= Continental Airways =

Passenger charter airline based in Moscow, Russia

IATA	ICAO	Call sign
PC	PVV	CONTAIR
- Founded: 1995
- Ceased operations: July 29, 2011
- Hubs: Sheremetyevo International Airport
- Fleet size: 10
- Destinations: 27
- Headquarters: Moscow, Russia

Continental Airways was a passenger charter airline based in Moscow, Russia. It was established in 1995 and operated out of Sheremetyevo International Airport.

== History ==
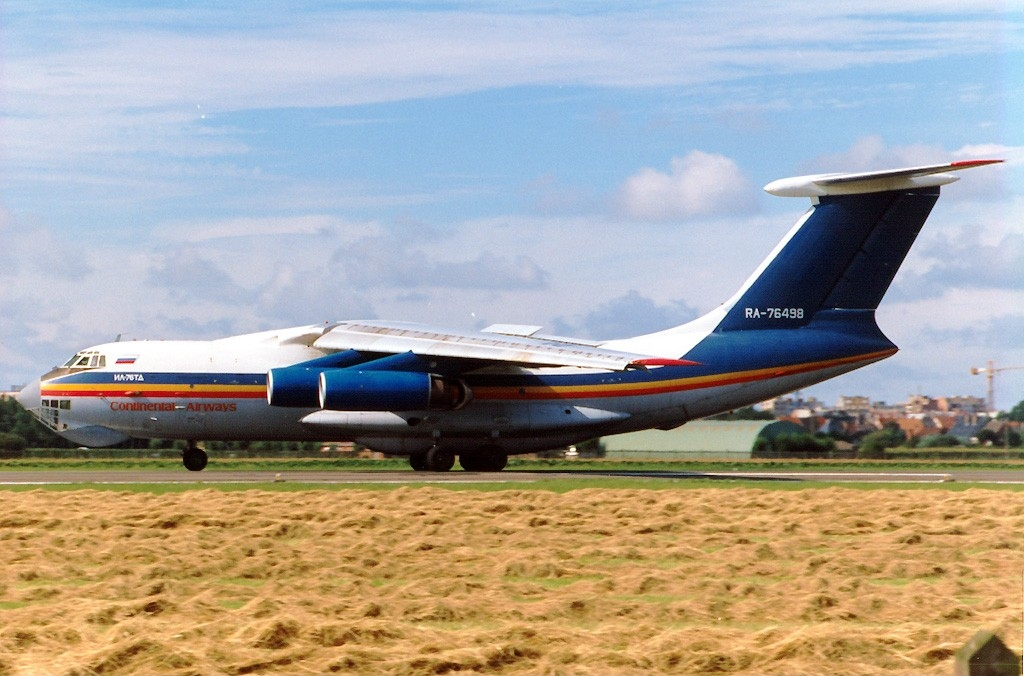
A Continental Ilyushin Il-76TD at Ostend–Bruges International Airport in 1997

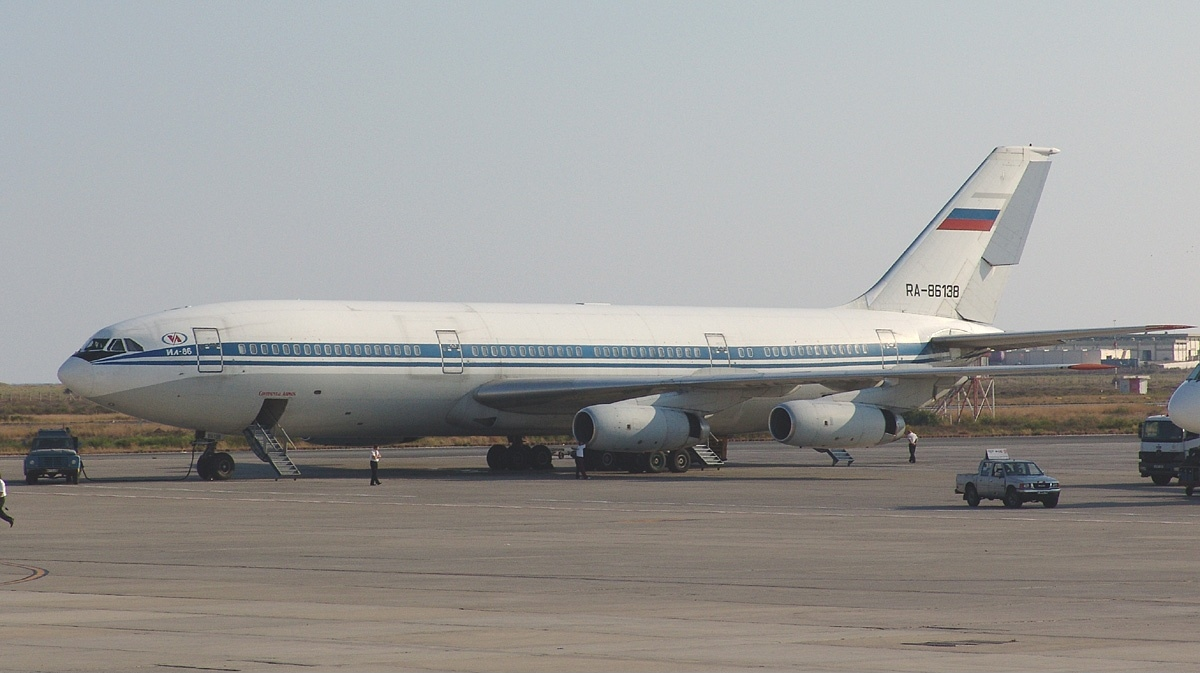
A Continental Ilyushin Il-86 parked at Larnaca International Airport in 2004

The airline was founded in 1995 as a cargo airline operating three Tupolev Tu-154s. Its initial base was Vnukovo International Airport. In 2000, it acquired three Ilyushin Il-76TDs to increase the number of routes it flew and add more destinations. In 2004, they acquired an additional four Tu-154s to start their passenger service, which would make its first flight in 2005.

After facing financial problems for two years, selling several Il-76s and suspending most of their destinations, the Rosaviatsiya revoked Continental's permission to fly on July 29, 2011. The next day, the airline declared bankruptcy, thus ceasing all its operations.

== Destinations ==
Continental Airways served the following scheduled destinations: Abakan, Anapa, Barnaul, Bratsk, Blagoveshchensk, Cheliabinsk, Gelendzhik, Irkutsk, Kazan, Kemerovo, Komsomolsk-on-Amur, Krasnodar, Krasnoyarsk, Moscow, Murmansk, Nizhni Novgorod, Norilsk, Novokuznetsk, Petropavl, Rostov-on-Don, Samara, Sochi, Ufa, Vladivostok, Yakutsk, Yekaterinburg, and Yuzhno-Sakhalinsk.

== Fleet ==
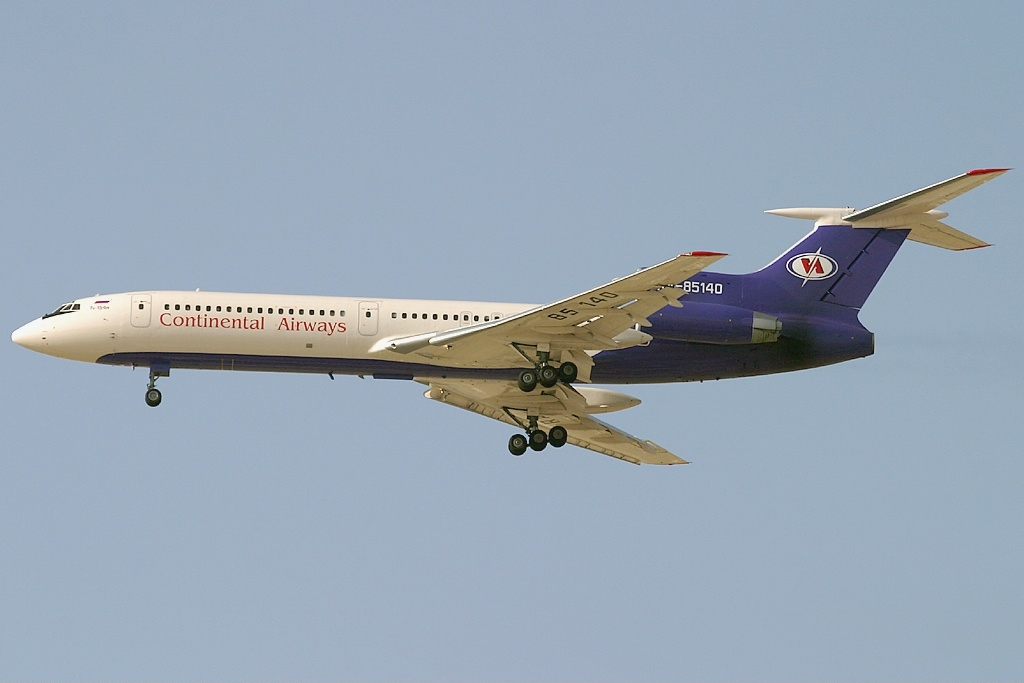
A Continental Tupolev Tu-154M at Dubai International Airport in 2005

Continental Airways operated the following aircraft:

Continental Airways fleet
Aircraft	Total	Introduced	Retired	Notes
Tupolev Tu-154M	10	2004	2007	
Ilyushin Il-76TD	5	1997	2011	
Ilyushin Il-86	2	1996	2006	Leased from Atlant-Soyuz Airlines

== See also ==
- List of defunct airlines of Russia
