= Skynet Airlines =

Irish airline

Skynet
IATA	ICAO	Call sign
SI	SIH	BLUEJET
- Founded: 2001
- Ceased operations: 2004

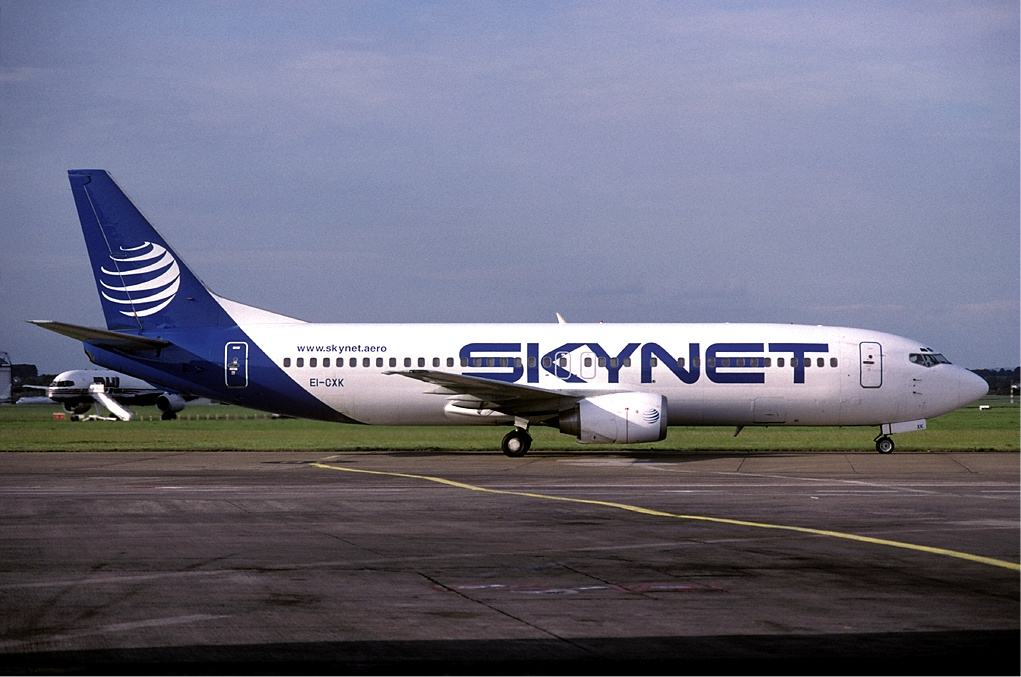
An Irish SkyNet Airlines Boeing 737-400

Skynet Airlines was an airline operating from Ireland to Russia via Amsterdam, that was operational between 2001 and 2004.

== History ==
Skynet began operations from Shannon Airport to Amsterdam, with onward connections to Moscow, Russia, using Boeing 737 aircraft. Skynet rented unused routes and airport slots from and operated code shared routes with Aeroflot.

In May 2004 the aircraft leasing company impounded Skynet's two Boeing 737 aircraft at Shannon amid a rent dispute, and the airline was forced to cancel all flights indefinitely. In June 2004 the airline announced it was in talks with Pulkovo Aviation Enterprise of St. Petersburg, but as of October 2004 no flights had taken place. A further plan to resume flights in May 2005 between Shannon, St Petersburg, Moscow and New York has also failed to occur.

After the company became defunct, its website was acquired by the Russian airline of the same name.
