= Dauria (disambiguation) =

Dauria, literally "Land of Daurs", may have the following meanings:

- Transbaikal, an area of Russia
- Dauriya, the land of the Daurs more generally, including areas of Inner Mongolia in China
- Dauria, an airline
- Dauria, a 1971 film from the Soviet Union

== See also ==
- Daurian (disambiguation)
