= Air Bashkortostan =

Russian airline (2006–2013)

Air Bashkortostan Авиакомпания «Башкортостан»

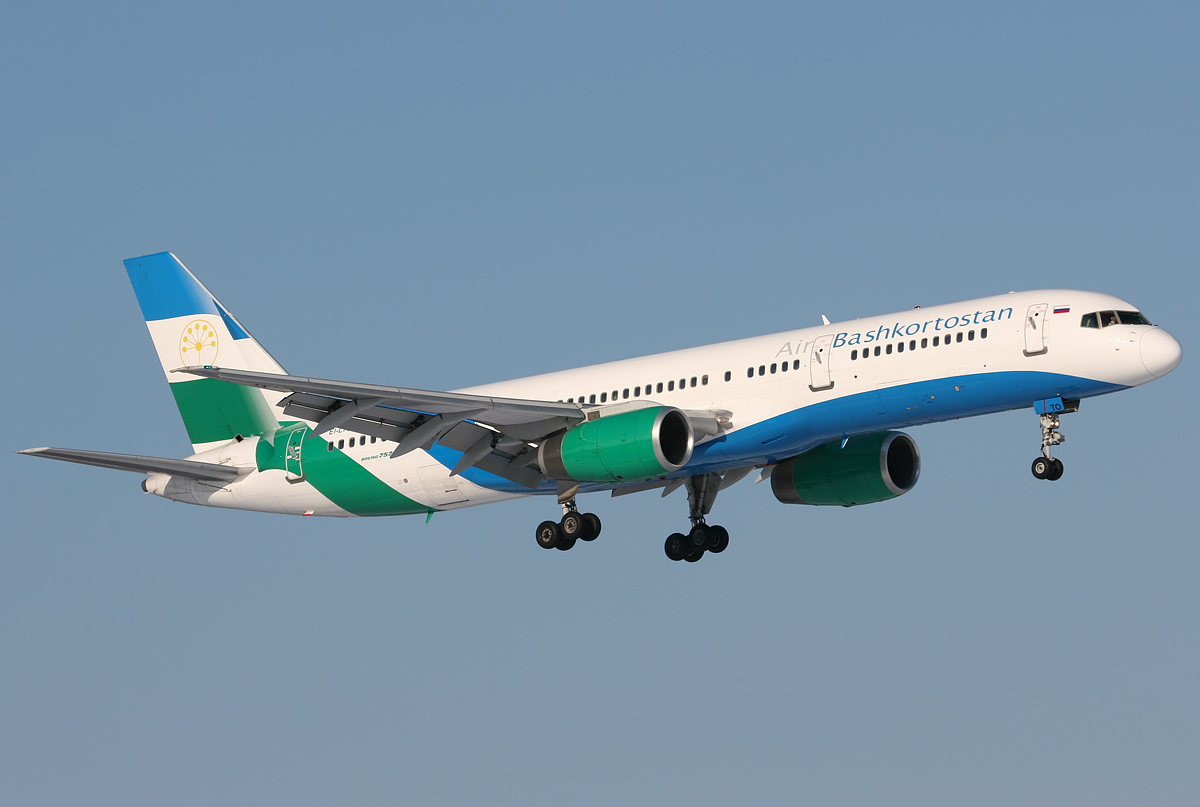
- A Boeing 757-200 on short final to Domodedovo International Airport in 2007.
IATA	ICAO	Call sign
ZU	BBT	AGYDAL
- Founded: August 2005
- Commenced operations: April 10, 2006
- Ceased operations: October 9, 2013
- Hubs: Ufa International Airport
- Secondary hubs: Moscow Domodedovo Airport
- Fleet size: 5
- Parent company: VIM Airlines (74%); Government of Bashkortostan (26%)
- Headquarters: Ufa, Russia
- Employees: 101 (March 2007)
- Website: airbashkortostan.ru

Air Bashkortostan, LLC (Russian: ООО «Авиакомпания «Башкортостан») was an airline based in Ufa, Bashkortostan, Russia. It operated scheduled flights and charters between its base at Ufa International Airport and Moscow Domodedovo Airport on flights operated by VIM Airlines with their aircraft.

== History ==
Air Bashkortostan started operations on April 10, 2006, as a successor to the now defunct BAL Bashkirian Airlines.

In 2010, the airline decided to venture into aerial imaging and put into operation one Diamond DA-42 specially equipped for this purpose.

In August 2011, the Government of Bashkortostan filed claims against the airline over the use of the name "Bashkortostan", arguing that the airline is not a solid enterprise and that this undermined the image of the republic. The airline's management refused to consider changing the name, as they are sure that its use was not a violation of current legislation.

On October 1, 2013, the airline stopped carrying out passenger traffic, with its remaining Boeing 757-200 being transferred back to VIM Airlines. Eight days later, Air Bashkortostan was closed down by VIM ahead of the airline's fleet renewal program. Rosaviatsiya revoked its operator's certificate on January 10, 2014.

== Fleet ==
Air Bashkortostan included the following aircraft (as of December 2013):

Aircraft	Total	Passengers	Notes
Boeing 757-200	4	220	Leased from VIM Airlines
Diamond DA42 NG	1	3	Aerial works, equipped with specialist imaging devices

== See also ==
- List of defunct airlines of Russia
