= Daurian =

Daurian may refer to:

- Daurs, an ethnic group in the People's Republic of China
- Daurian language
- Dauriya, historical and geographical region spanning modern Buryatia, Zabaykalsky Krai and the Amur Region.
- Transbaikal, a region in Russia, also known as Dauriya

== See also ==
- Dauria (disambiguation)
