= Moskovia Airlines Flight 9675 =

2008 An-12 crash

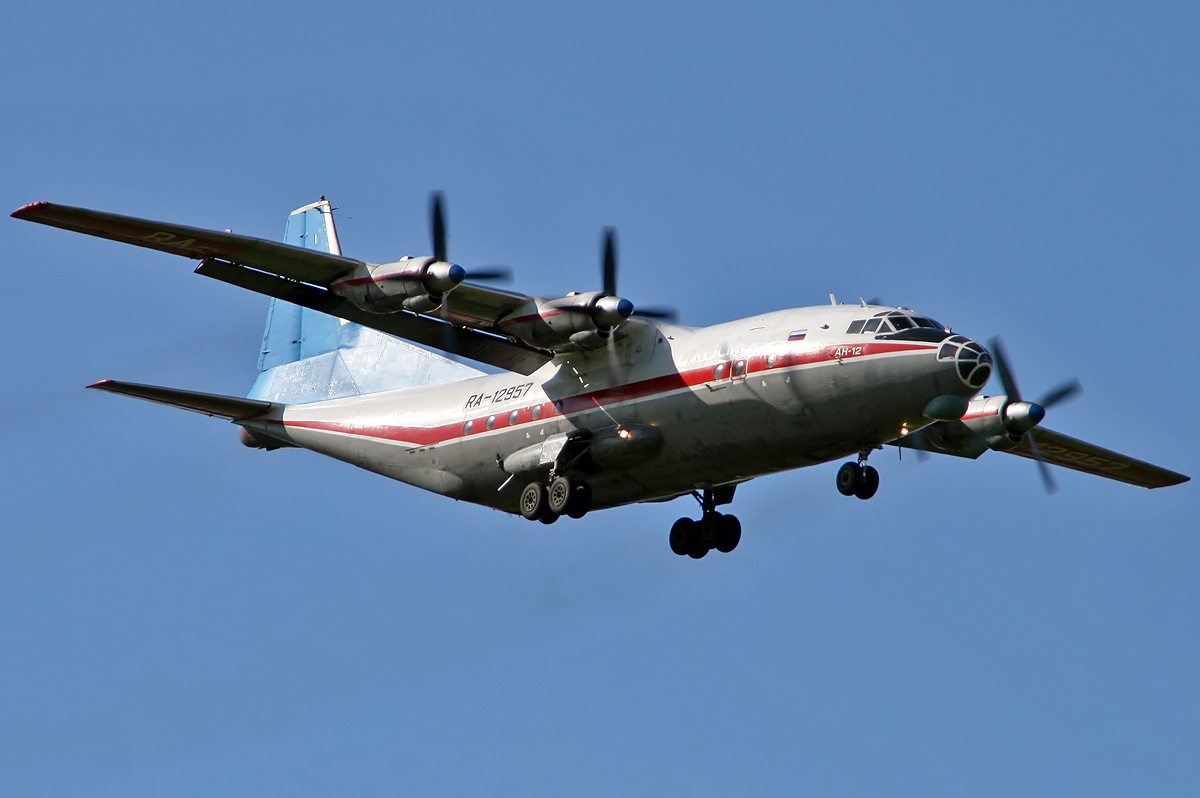
- RA-12957, the aircraft involved in the accident, seen 4 days before the accident

Accident
- Date: 26 May 2008
- Summary: In-flight fire leading to the destruction on aileron wiring that led to aileron failure
- Site: Chelyabinsk Balandino Airport; 55°18′47.0″N 61°19′00.6″E

Aircraft
- Aircraft type: Antonov An-12BP
- Operator: Moskovia Airlines
- IATA flight No.: 3R9675
- ICAO flight No.: GAI9675
- Registration: RA-12957
- Flight origin: Chelyabinsk Airport, Chelyabinsk, Russia
- Destination: Perm Airport, Perm, Russia
- Occupants: 9
- Crew: 9
- Fatalities: 9
- Survivors: 0

On 26 May 2008, Moskovia Airlines Flight 9675, a Moskovia Airlines An-12 cargo aircraft crashed near Chelyabinsk, Russia. After taking off for a flight to Perm, it turned back due to a fire on board and crashed 11 kilometres (6.8 mi; 5.9 nmi) from the airport, killing all nine crew members.

== Background ==
The aircraft, registered RA-12957 (cn 88345508), was built in 1968. After transporting a cargo of cash from Moscow to Chelyabinsk, it was operating as an empty flight numbered GAI9675 to Perm.

== Flight ==
During the pre-takeoff checklist, the crew noted warnings about a power supply failure in engines 1 and 2, but ignored them, as recorded by the CVR:

- Flight radio operator: "Sanya." (name of the engineer)
- Flight engineer: "Yes?"
- Flight radio operator: "Number two failed"
- Instructor pilot: "And number one too"
- Flight radio operator: "Alternator"
- A crew member: "Screw it"
- Flight radio operator: "Here we go"

The investigation team concluded that "here we go" probably referred to successful reactivation of the alternators by the radio operator.

The flight took off at 14:03 from Runway 09. At 14:03:55, the captain asked "What's the matter?". The flight engineer responded "doors open". It is unclear whether he was referring to the cargo doors or chassis doors, but the final report states that it was probably the chassis doors. The investigation found that the doors were closed at the time of the crash, and the false alarm was one of the first signs of problems in the power lines in the aircraft.

Another warning sounded 6 seconds later: "Too low, gear". This was erroneous, as the aircraft was climbing, and this warning can be triggered only during descent.

At 14:04:09, other crew members in the cabin advised the pilots about the fire.

- Captain: "Come on, have a quick look... take a look what's going on there"
- Flight radio operator: "Let's land maybe, or... OK, requesting"
- Captain: "Wait, wait"
- First officer: "My attitude indicator failed"
- Captain: "Got it, taking control"

At this point, the aircraft was at 470 metres (1,540 ft) altitude and turning left. At 14:04:28, the captain decided to turn back to Chelyabinsk. The crew contacted ATC and requested priority landing due to smoke in the cockpit.

The weather was cloudy, ceiling 90–100 metres (300–330 ft), visibility 1,100 metres (3,600 ft). CVR recordings showed that the pilots discussed further failures of multiple systems, as well as multiple false failure alarms. They also stated that the source of fire was in the cargo section, and considered depressurizing the cabin. A trim failure warning was triggered at 14:07:15, and at 14:08, engine dislodging indicators were also triggered. The flight engineer warned the crew to operate the throttle slowly.

At 14:09:13, while the aircraft was turning left, engine 2 became unstable. Moments later, multiple fuses went off. At 14:09:54, engines 1 and 2 stopped due to fuel starvation. The cockpit voice recorder then stopped working, and the flight data recorder began to malfunction.

At 14:10:21, the captain started turning for the final approach. With only two engines operating, the plane's speed fell to 280 kilometres per hour (150 kn; 170 mph), the minimum permitted without flaps. Engine 3 was operating at 20%, and engine 4 was throttled back to 85%.

Beginning at 14:10:40, the aircraft began to bank heavily left (to 32°). It began descending at 14:10:48. At 14:10:43, the crew contacted the control tower and reported, "Gromov 9675, on landi... turning to final, 400, approaching, continuing approach". This was the crew's final transmission.

At 31 m above the ground, the aircraft clipped a high-voltage power line with its left wing. The aircraft then crashed in a field at 14:10:56, 11 kilometres (6.8 mi; 5.9 nmi) from Runway 09. Vertical speed at the time of impact was 5,000 feet per minute (25 m/s).

== Investigation ==
An investigation concluded that during the last fifteen seconds of flight, the crew was unable to effectively operate the ailerons. Medical experts ruled out incapacitation due to smoke inhalation, meaning that the pilots could not operate the ailerons because of mechanical failure caused by the fire.

A fire also broke out after the crash. Because of the fire on the crash site, the investigation could not determine the exact location of the fire in the electrical system that caused the accident. The flight recorders were found severely damaged, but usable.

The final report states the following reasons for the accident:

The aviation incident with An-12 aircraft registered RA-12957 occurred as a result of impact with ground caused by lost control over the aircraft due to the destruction of aileron control wires during an emergency approach for landing because of smoke in the cabin.

[...] Aileron control wires were destroyed most probably due to significant heating of nearby steel wires and subsequent breaking under operating load.

The heating may have been caused by an in-flight fire of nearby power lines, which is evidenced by smoke in the cabin, unexpected triggering of multiple warnings, equipment failures, and the failure of two engines.

== Crew ==
The captain had 14,928 hours of flying experience, and the navigator had 11,021 hours. Both of them had no prior incidents.

== See also ==
- Air Moorea Flight 1121
- Caspian Airlines Flight 7908
- Propair Flight 420, another in flight fire that led to the failure of a wing.
