= Koryak Air Enterprise =

Koryakavia
- Founded: October 1, 1956
- Ceased operations: 2010
- Hubs: Kamchatka, Russia
- Fleet size: 6
- Headquarters: Kamchatka, Russia

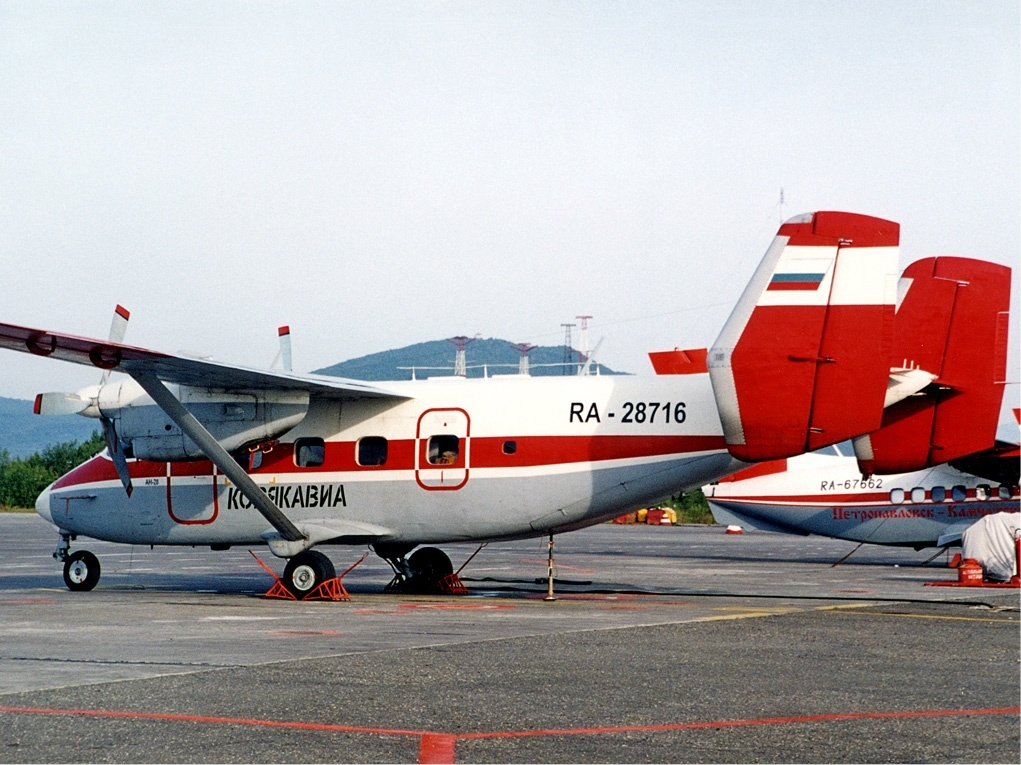
Antonov An-28

Koryak Air Enterprise was a Russian passenger and cargo airline based in Kamchatka, Russia. Starting in 2006, it was government-subsidised. It merged with Petropavlovsk-Kamchatsky Air Enterprise in 2010.

== Fleet ==
Aircraft type	Active	Notes
Mil Mi-8	4	(RA-25195, RA-25388, RA-25617, RA-25618)
Antonov An-28	2	(RA-28714, RA-28715) [scheduled]

== Incidents ==
A Mil Mi-8T (RA-24209) cargo flight was at an altitude of 850 meters when the crew made an emergency landing in a mountainous area in the upper reaches of the river Zhgachka, during which the helicopter collided with the ground and partially collapsed. The co-pilot and flight engineer were wounded. The captain phoned for help and, after assisting the wounded, went back into the helicopter where he was later found dead - from suicide by hanging. According to preliminary information, the reason for a forced landing was either an ice buildup or overloading of the helicopter. Subsequent investigation revealed ice to be the cause of stalling with the helicopter's altitude too low for it to regain height on restarting.
