= Polet Flight =

Russian cargo and passenger airline

CJSC Aircompany "Polet" ЗАО «Авиакомпания „Полёт“»
IATA	ICAO	Call sign
YQ	POT	POLET
- Founded: 9 August 1988
- Ceased operations: December 2014
- Hubs: Ulyanovsk (cargo); Voronezh (passenger)
- Focus cities: Moscow
- Fleet size: 28
- Destinations: 11
- Parent company: Anatoly Karpov (100%)
- Headquarters: Voronezh, Russia
- Key people: Anatoly Karpov (CEO)
- Website: www.polet.ru (defunct)

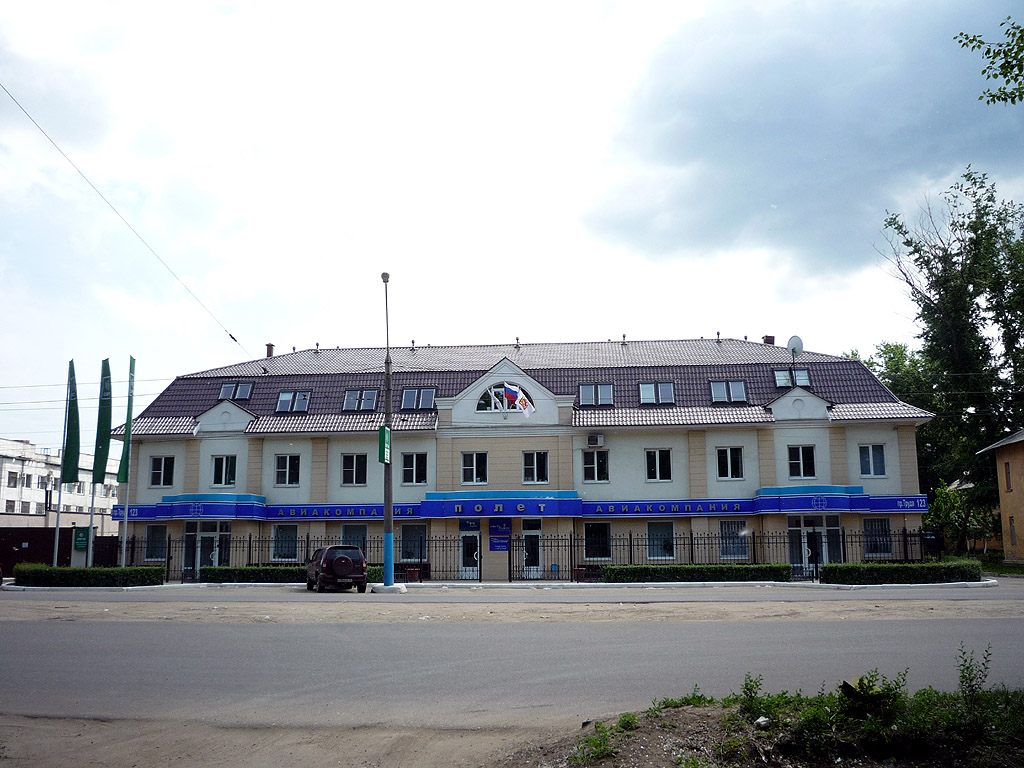
Polet head office

CJSC «Polet Flight» (Russian: ЗАО «Авиакомпания „Полёт“», ZAO «Aviakompániya "Polyót"») was an airline based in Voronezh, Russia. It operated a worldwide cargo and domestic passenger charter services from Voronezh, as well as regional passenger and cargo services from Sokol. It was one of two airlines which flew the Antonov An-124 Ruslan, the world's highest gross weight cargo airplane which specialises in oversized freight. Its collapse, over lease payments for these massive aircraft, left only the Volga-Dnepr Airlines/Antonov Airlines joint partnership in this market. Its main base was Chertovitskoye Airport, Voronezh. Polet is the Russian word for flight.

== History ==
The airline was established and started operations in 1988. In 2002 Polet began serving the agricultural, aeromedical and aerial photography markets. The airline was wholly owned by Anatoly S Karpov (Chief Executive and General Director) and had a 19.5% holding in Voronezhavia.

In December 2013, the carrier announced that it was evaluating the acquisition of five mid size jets for charter operations out of Voronezh.

Polet was sued by Alexander Lebedev, who claimed that it owned US$8 million in lease payments for An-124 aircraft.

Polet suspended both passenger and cargo operations on 24 November 2014 after which a Moscow Arbitration Court on 28 November placed the carrier into administration. Rosaviatsia cancelled Polet's AOC in April 2015.

== Destinations ==
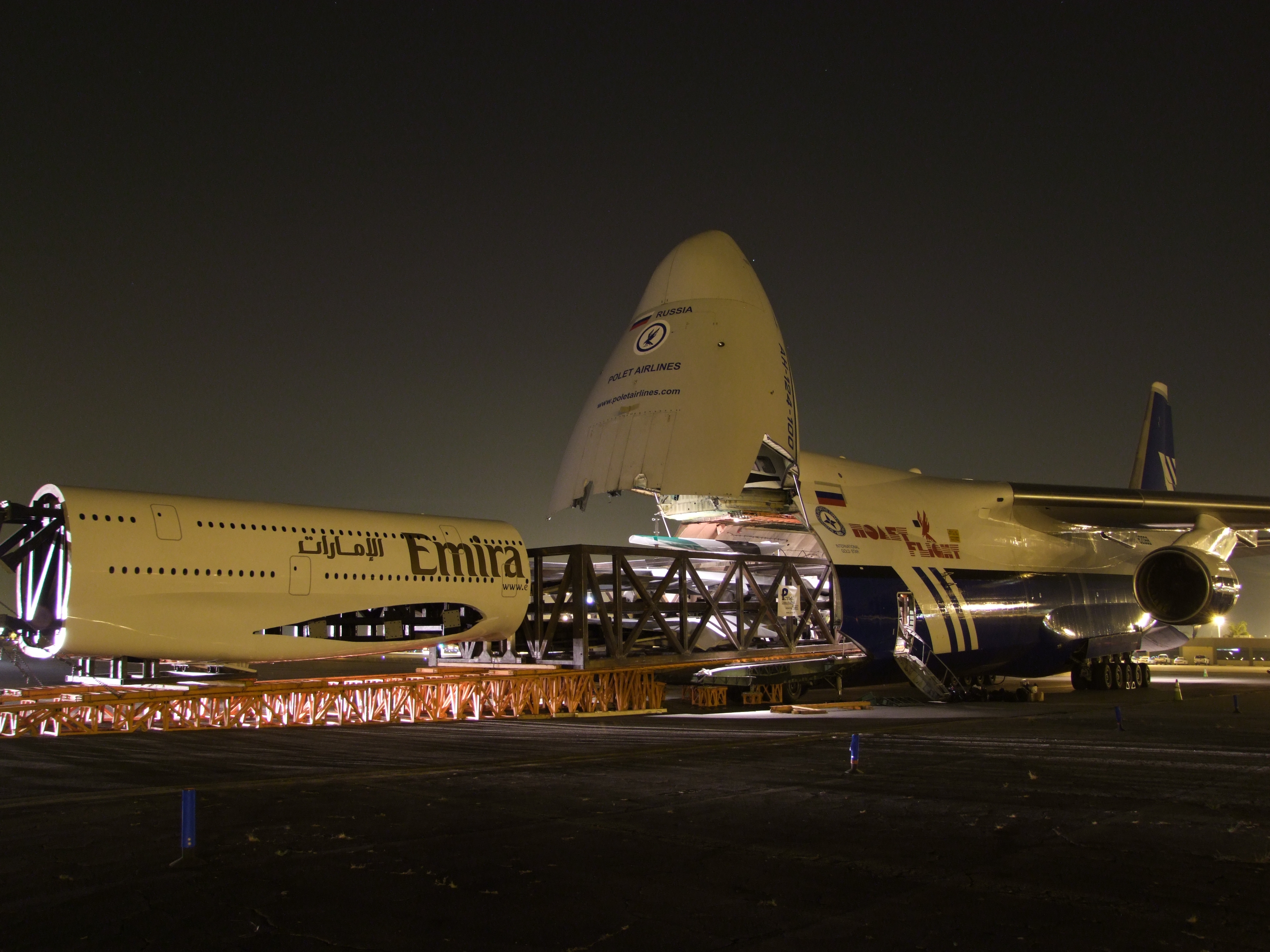
Part of an Emirates Airbus A380 mock-up being loaded on an Antonov An-124.

As of October 2013, Polet Airlines operated scheduled passenger flights to the following destinations:

=== Europe ===
- Czech Republic
  - Prague – Prague Václav Havel Airport
- France
  - Châlons-en-Champagne - Châlons Vatry Airport
- Germany
  - Munich – Munich Airport
- Greece
  - Heraklion – Heraklion International Airport (Seasonal)
  - Rhodes – Rhodes International Airport (Seasonal)
- Latvia
  - Riga - Riga International Airport
- Lithuania
  - Vilnius - Vilnius International Airport
- Russia
  - Anapa – Anapa Airport
  - Belgorod – Belgorod International Airport
  - Lipetsk – Lipetsk Airport
  - Moscow – Domodedovo Airport
  - Saint Petersburg – Pulkovo Airport
  - Simferopol – Simferopol International Airport
  - Sochi – Sochi Airport
  - Ulyanovsk – Ulyanovsk Vostochny Airport
  - Voronezh – Voronezh International Airport (Hub)

=== Western Asia ===
- Armenia
  - Yerevan – Zvartnots International Airport
- Turkey
  - Antalya – Antalya Airport (Charter)
- United Arab Emirates
  - Dubai – Dubai International Airport (Charter)(Cargo Only)

== Fleet ==
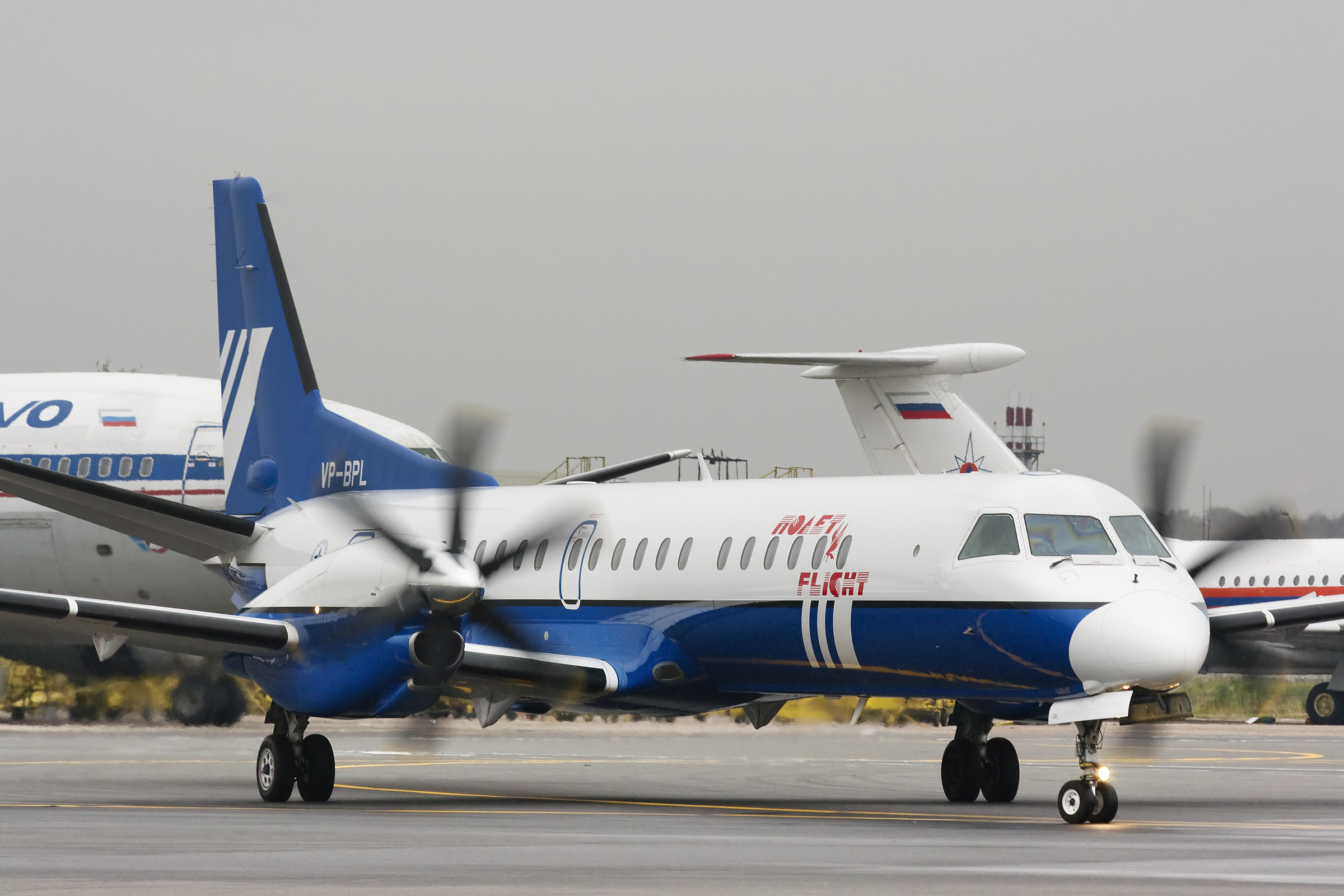
Polet Airlines Saab 2000 at Domodedovo International Airport

The Polet Airlines fleet included the following aircraft (as of December 2013):

Aircraft	In fleet	Orders	Passengers			Age (By years)	Notes
Aircraft	In fleet	Orders	C	Y	Total	Age (By years)	Notes
Antonov An-30A	2	—	Cartography			35.7	
Antonov An-124-100	4	5	Cargo			16	
Antonov An-148	2	8	TBA				
BAe 125-800	5	—	8	—	8	Unknown	
Ilyushin Il-76TD	1	—	Cargo			Unknown	Sold to Zet Avia
Ilyushin Il-96T	3	—	Cargo			1.9	Stored
Saab 340B	5	20	—	34	34	19.6	
Saab 2000	5	2	8	42	50	12.7	
Tupolev Tu-134A	1	—	TBA			31	
Total	18	24					
