= Chitaavia =

Russian airline

| IATA | ICAO | Call sign |
|---|---|---|
| — | CHF | Chita |
- Founded: 1991
- Commenced operations: 2004 (acquired by VIM Airlines)
- Operating bases: Kadala Airport
- Headquarters: Chita, Russia

Chitaavia was an airline based in Chita, Russia. It operated scheduled passenger and cargo services, as well as aerial work, out of its base at Kadala Airport unsing a single aircraft, a Tupolev Tu-154B-2. Founded in 1991, the company was acquired by VIM Airlines in 2004.

== History ==
At the end of 2004, VIM Airlines acquired Chitaavia.
