= Aviapanh =

AviaPANH
IATA	ICAO	Call sign
ЦЦ	—	—
- Founded: 1991
- Ceased operations: 2011
- Operating bases: Ivanovo Yuzhny Airport
- Headquarters: Ivanovo
- Key people: Alekhine Alex D. (CEO)

AviaPANH was a Russian charter helicopter operator based in Ivanovo. Its licence was revoked in October 2011.

== Fleet ==
Aircraft type	Active	Notes
Mil Mi-2	2	
