= KD Avia =

Russian airline (1945–2019)

IATA	ICAO	Call sign
KD	KNI	KALININGRAD AIR
- Founded: 8 October 1945 (as part of Aeroflot; 1992 (became independent)
- Ceased operations: 8 September 2009
- Hubs: Khrabrovo Airport
- Headquarters: Kaliningrad, Russia
- Key people: Valery Mikhailov (General Director); Leonid Itskov (Executive Director)

KD Avia, sometimes called Kaliningrad Avia, was an airline based in Kaliningrad, Russia. It operated scheduled services within Russia, CIS and Europe. Its main base was Khrabrovo Airport, Kaliningrad.

== History ==
The airline was established on 8 October 1945 and started operations in 1946. It launched international services in 2004 and announced on 27 May 2005 that it was to change its name from Kaliningrad Avia to KD Avia, to differentiate itself from the state-owned company of the same name which operates from Khrabrovo Airport.

In 2005, the airline started a fleet renovation project and removed from operation its Tupolev Tu-134 and Tupolev Tu-154 aircraft, replacing them with Boeing 737-300s, acquired from a wide variety of other airlines. The first Boeing 737-300 was delivered to the airline in February 2005, and by the end of the year, six were in operation. During 2005, the airline operated scheduled flights from Kaliningrad to Moscow and St. Petersburg, as well as charter flights from Moscow, Kaliningrad and other Russian cities to destinations in Turkey, Egypt and Europe.

The airline was investing into building a new modern passenger terminal in Khrabrovo airport which would be the main transit hub in a hub-and-spoke system of routes, which the airline was planning to introduce on 15 June 2007. In the first stage, up to 13 cities of the Russian Federation would be connected with 13–15 cities of Europe by transit flights via Kaliningrad.

The concept of the airline was to connect Russia and other CIS countries with Europe.

On 4 September 2009, it was announced KD Avia would have its operating certificate revoked on 14 September 2009, with ceasure of all flights.

On 8 September 2009, KD Avia suspended its flights.

On 2 December 2009, the company's owner Sergei Grishchenko and executive director Leonid Itskov were charged with abuse of power and intentional bankruptcy. According to the prosecution, Grischenko and Itskov conducted a lot of deals with companies affiliated personally with Grishchenko that made no financial sense for KD Avia and led to company insolvency.

== Former destinations ==
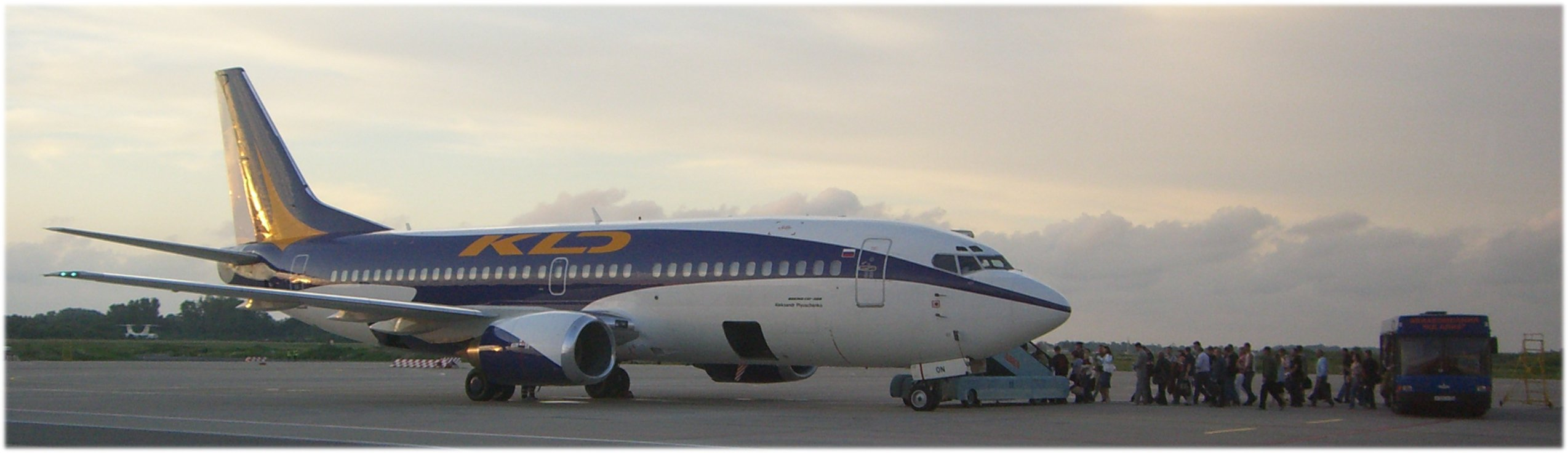
A KD Avia Boeing 737-300 at Khrabrovo Airport, Russia (2007)

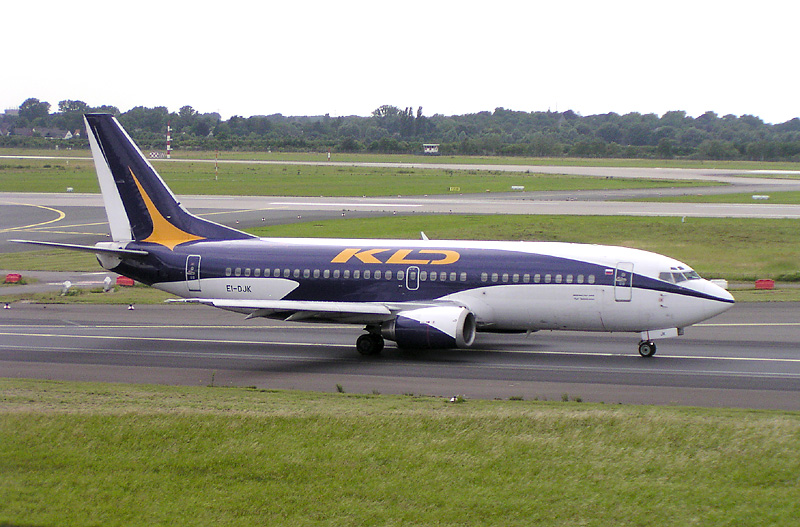
A KD Avia Boeing 737-300 taxiing at Düsseldorf Airport, Germany (2007)

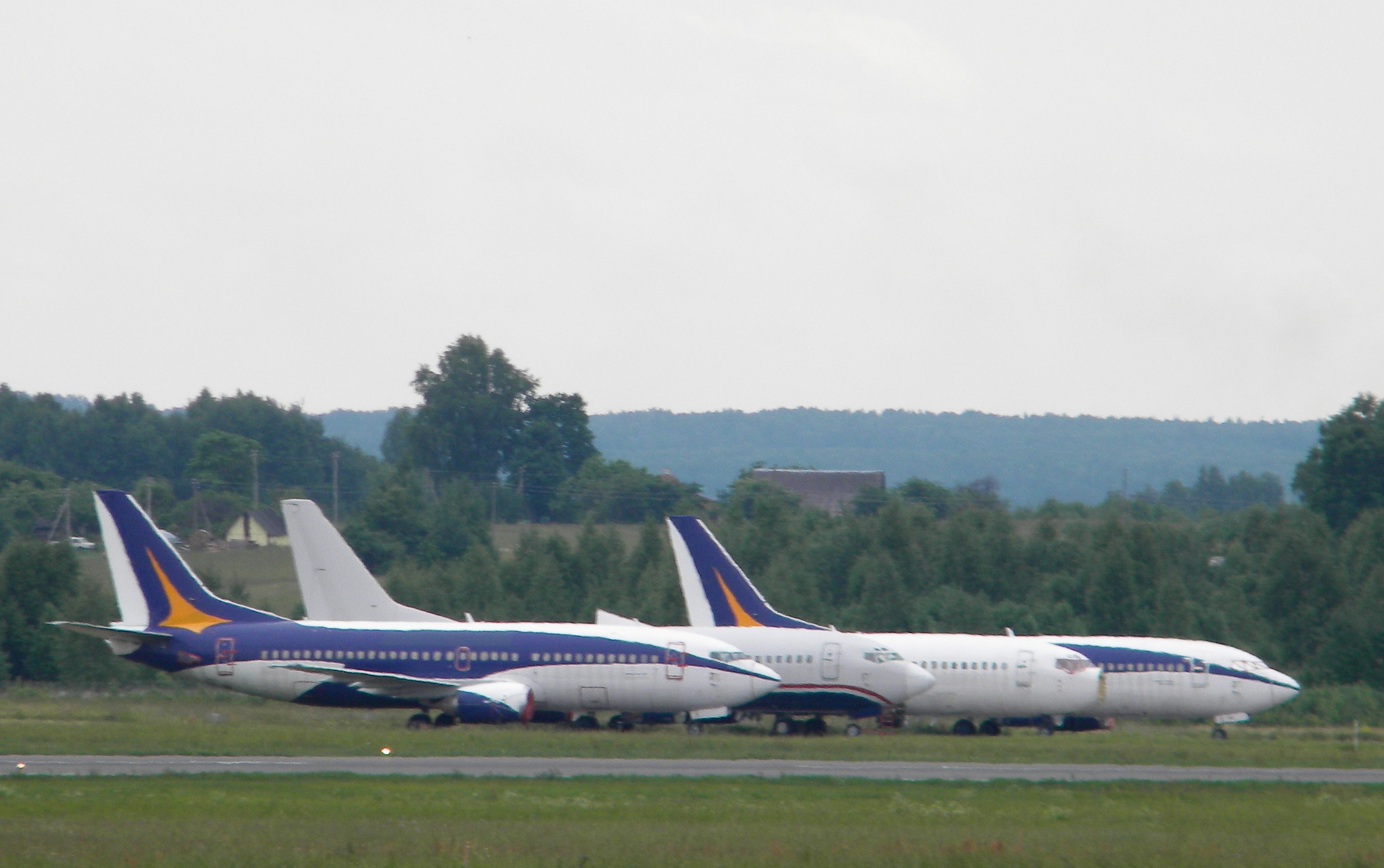
Former KD Avia Boeing 737s rusting at the Vilnius International Airport (2011)

Asia

- Kazakhstan
  - Astana (Nursultan Nazarbayev International Airport)
- Israel
  - Tel Aviv (Ben Gurion International Airport)

Europe

- Czech Republic
  - Prague (Ruzyně International Airport)
- France
  - Paris (Charles de Gaulle Airport)
- Germany
  - Berlin (Berlin Tegel Airport)
  - Düsseldorf (Düsseldorf Airport)
  - Hamburg (Hamburg Airport)
  - Hanover (Hannover Airport)
  - Munich (Munich Airport)
- Italy
  - Milan (Malpensa International Airport)
- Russia
  - Chelyabinsk (Chelyabinsk Balandino Airport)
  - Kaliningrad (Khrabrovo Airport), hub
  - Kazan (Kazan International Airport)
  - Moscow
    - Domodedovo International Airport
    - Sheremetyevo International Airport
  - Omsk (Tsentralny Airport)
  - Perm (Bolshoye Savino Airport)
  - Rostov-on-Don (Rostov-on-Don Airport)
  - Saint Petersburg (Pulkovo Airport)
  - Samara (Samara Kurumoch Airport)
  - Ufa (Ufa International Airport)
  - Yekaterinburg (Koltsovo Airport)
- Spain
  - Barcelona (Barcelona International Airport)
- Netherlands
  - Amsterdam (Amsterdam Airport Schiphol)
- Ukraine
  - Kyiv (Boryspil International Airport)
- United Kingdom
  - London (London Gatwick Airport)

== Fleet ==
The KD Avia fleet consisted of the following aircraft (at September 2009):

KD Avia fleet
Aircraft	In fleet	Passengers
Boeing 737-300	19	148
Total	19	

On 29 May 2008, KD Avia placed a commitment with Airbus for the purchase of 25 A319-100s to replace the ageing 737-300s. None were delivered.

== Incidents and accidents ==
- On 1 October 2008, Flight 794 from Barcelona to Kaliningrad, operated by a Boeing 737-300 (registered EI-DON), made a wheels-up landing resulting in severe damage to the aircraft. On their second approach after a go-around, the crew forgot to lower the gear while manually switching off the related alarm and performed the wheels-up landing on its second approach to Kaliningrad. None of the 138 passengers and six crew on board were injured.
