= Tambov-Avia =

Tambov Avia
- Founded: 1993
- Ceased operations: 2009
- Hubs: Tambov Donskoye Airport, Tambov
- Fleet size: 5
- Headquarters: Tambov
- Key people: Aristov Anatoly (General Manager)

Tambov Avia was a passenger charter airline based in Tambov, Russia.

== Fleet ==
| Aircraft type | Active | Notes |
|---|---|---|
| Antonov An-2 | 5 | |

== Legal proceedings ==
The general manager, Anatoly Aristov, was suspected (in 2009) of illegally receiving over 4 million roubles. Criminal proceedings were launched against him at the request of the three co-founders of the airline.

== Bankruptcy ==
Tambov Avia was declared bankrupt and its license revoked in 2009.
