= Voronezhavia =

- Operating bases: Voronezh

Voronezhavia was an airline based in Voronezh, Russia. Its flight operations had been taken over by Polet Flight, Voronezhavia itself manages Voronezh Airport.

== Code data ==
- IATA Code: ZT
- ICAO Code: VRN
- Callsign: Voronezhavia

== Destinations ==
=== Domestic destinations ===
- Anapa
- Chelyabinsk
- Yekaterinburg
- Kazan
- Moscow
- Norilsk
- Perm
- Saint Petersburg
- Samara
- Sochi
- Ufa
- Voronezh

=== International destinations ===
- Turkey
  - Adana
- Azerbaijan
  - Baku
- Moldova
  - Chişinău
- Ukraine
  - Dnipro
  - Kyiv
- Belarus
  - Minsk
- Armenia
  - Yerevan
