= Interavia Airlines =

Russian domestic airline

INTERAVIA Airlines Авиакомпания Интеравиа
IATA	ICAO	Call sign
ZA	SUW	INTERAVIA
- Founded: 1998
- Ceased operations: 2008
- Hubs: Domodedovo International Airport
- Focus cities: Sochi, Mineralnye Vody, Anapa, Magadan
- Fleet size: 7
- Destinations: 7
- Headquarters: Moscow, Russia
- Key people: Gen. Director Vladimir N. Gloshkin
- Website: www.inter-avia.ru

Interavia Airlines (Russian: Авиакомпания Интеравиа) was an airline based in Moscow, Russia. It operated scheduled and charter passenger services. Its main base was Domodedovo International Airport, Moscow. The Russian aviation authority suspended their flights from 17 October 2008.

== History ==
The airline was established as Astair Airlines in 1998 and became Interavia Airlines on 18 May 2005. It started regular services from Moscow in July 2005. Interavia Airlines was registered as a corporation with publicly traded stock, with no shares owned by the Russian Government.

Because of financial difficulties, the airline suspended operations on October 9, 2008 and shortly thereafter lost its operating licence. Astair only flew with a few (or one) Yakovlev Yak-42.

== Destinations ==
As at October 2008, Interavia Airlines operated flights to:

- Russia
  - Adler/Sochi (Sochi International Airport)
  - Anapa (Anapa Airport)
  - Arkhangelsk (Talagi Airport)
  - Blagoveshchensk (Ignatyevo Airport)
  - Irkutsk (Irkutsk Airport)
  - Magadan (Sokol Airport)
  - Makhachkala (Uytash Airport)
  - Mineralnye Vody (Mineralnye Vody Airport)
  - Moscow (Domodedovo Airport)

== Fleet ==
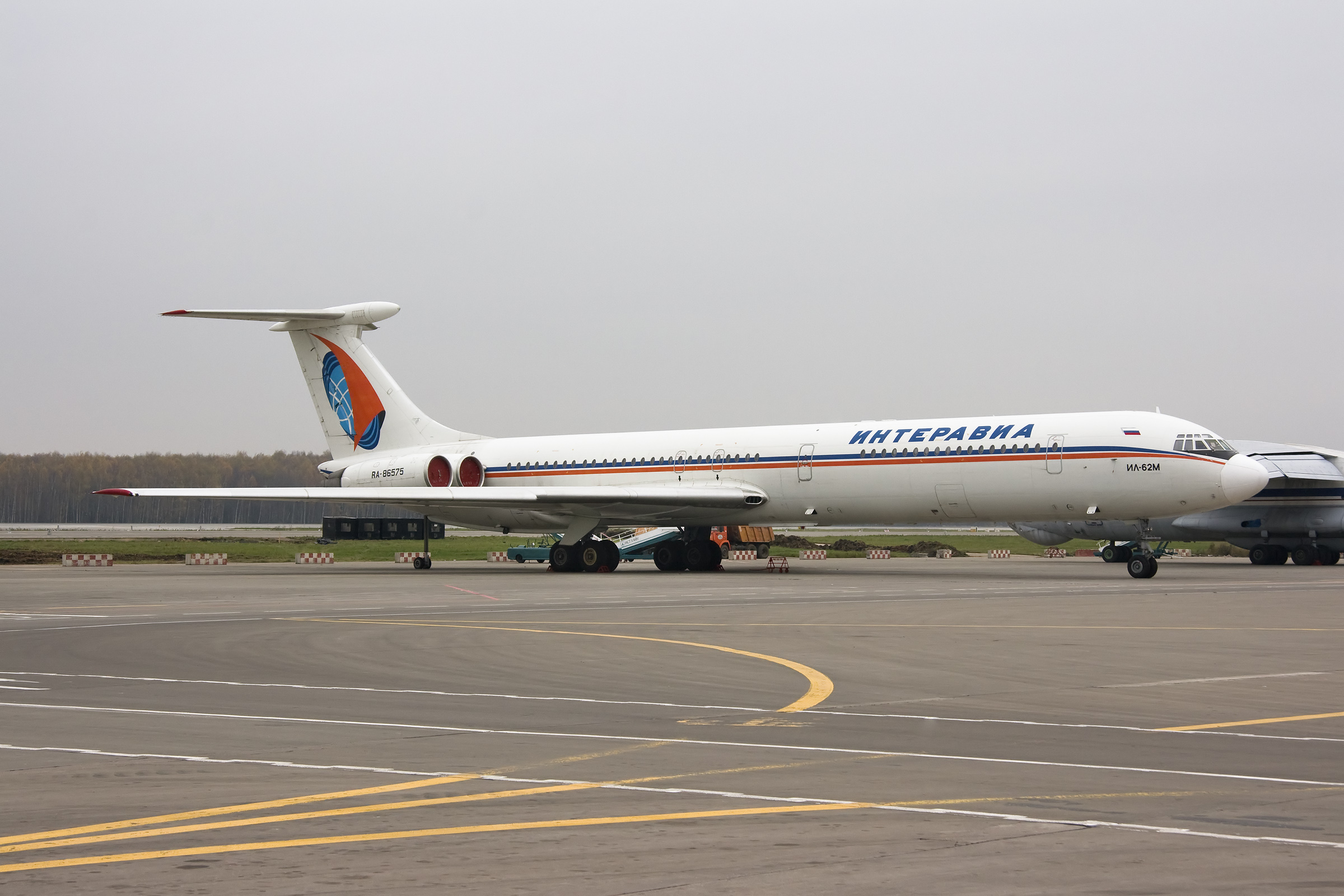
Ilyushin Il-62M at Domodedovo airport

The Interavia Airlines fleet included the following aircraft (as of 6 October 2008):

Interavia fleet
Aircraft	Total
Tupolev Tu-154M	2
Yakovlev Yak-42	1
Ilyushin Il-62	4
Total	7

The corporation planned to buy several Italian ATR-42 40-50-seat turboprops and some Boeing aircraft.
