= Aviaprad =

Russian airline

Aviaprad Авиапрад
IATA	ICAO	Call sign
WR	VID	AVIAPRAD
- Founded: 1996
- Ceased operations: February 5, 2008
- Hubs: Koltsovo International Airport
- Fleet size: 10
- Destinations: 27
- Headquarters: Yekaterinburg, Russia
- Website: https://www.aviaprad.ru

CJSC, Aviaprad (Russian: ЗАО «Авиапрад») was an airline based in Yekaterinburg, Russia. It operated domestic and international cargo charters from Yekaterinburg to destinations within the CIS, Western Europe, China and the United Arab Emirates. Its main base was Koltsovo International Airport, Yekaterinburg.

== History ==
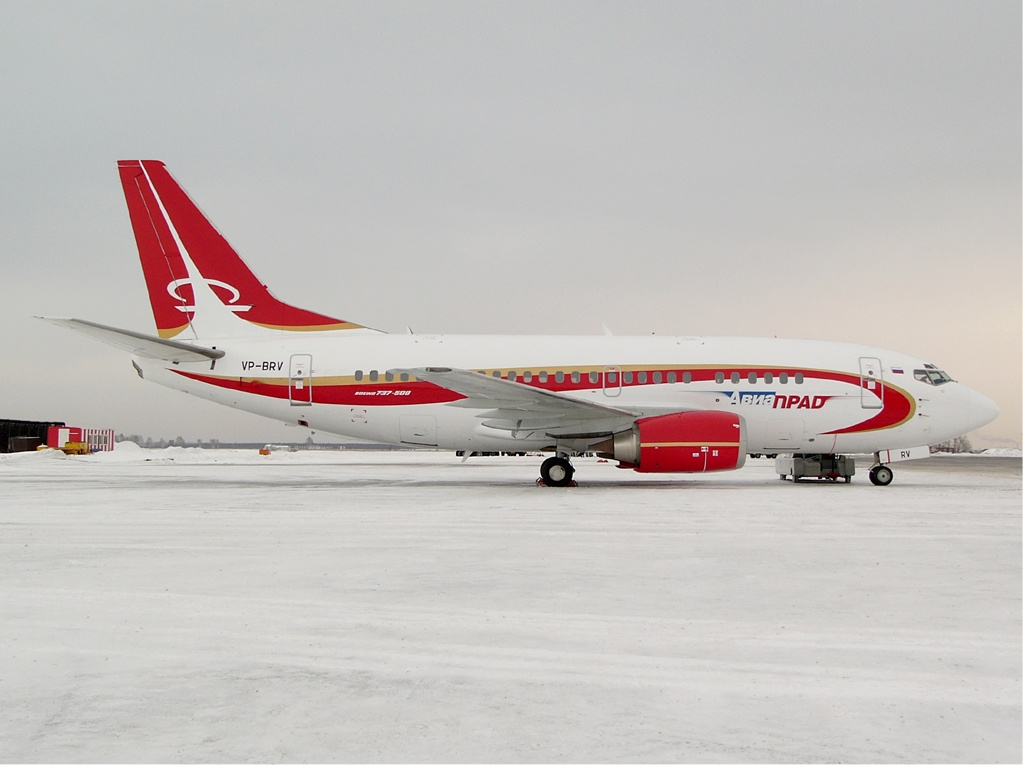
Aviaprad Boeing 737-500 in 2006.

The airline was established in 1996. It is wholly owned by Ural Civil Aviation Works. On 9 November 2006, services started between Yekaterinburg and Moscow using a newly acquired Boeing 757-200 wet leased from VIM Airlines. More aircraft later joined the fleet and more destinations were added.

But in February 2008, all bookings were suddenly suspended with the flights transferred to other airlines. Despite still being an officially registered company, all operations were ceased. The employees were laid off and the aircraft returned to the lessors or offered for sale.

In 2019, information appeared that the company plans to resume freight traffic with new owners and receive a new certificate of the operator.

== Destinations ==
By the end of 2007, the company served the following destinations:

- Russia
  - Anapa
  - Beloyarskiy
  - Chelyabinsk (hub)
  - Irkutsk
  - Khanty-Mansiysk
  - Krasnodar
  - Bokhtar
  - Magnitogorsk
  - Mirny
  - Mineralnye Vody
  - Moscow-Domodedovo
  - Norilsk
  - Novosibirsk
  - Novy Urengoy
  - Nyagan
  - Nizhnevartovsk
  - Saint Petersburg
  - Samara
  - Sochi
  - Sovetskiy
  - Surgut
  - Ufa
  - Ust-Kamenogorsk
  - Yekaterinburg (hub)
- Germany
  - Frankfurt
  - Hannover
- United Arab Emirates
  - Dubai

== Fleet ==
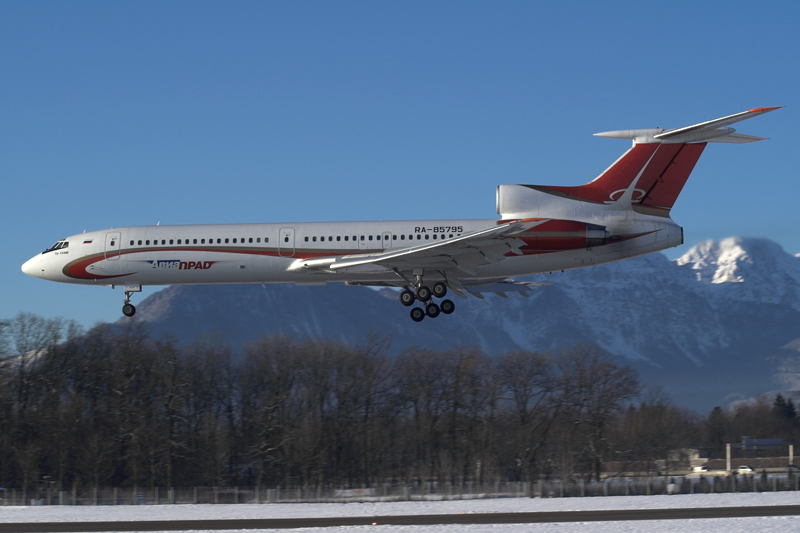
Aviaprad Tupolev Tu-154M

The Aviaprad fleet consisted of the following aircraft (in June 2007):

- 2 Boeing 737-500
- 4 Yakovlev Yak-42 (All leased to Saratov Airlines)
- 2 Antonov An-28 (code shared with "Region-Avia")
- 2 Tupolev Tu-154M (All leased to VIM Airlines)

In mid-2007, Aviaprad introduced two former Kuban Airlines Tupolev Tu-154M aircraft (RA-85795 and RA-85123) to its fleet to operate charter services to Europe.

=== Previously operated ===
- 1 Ilyushin Il-76TD
