= Moskovia Airlines =

Russian airline (1995–2014)

IATA	ICAO	Call sign
3R	GAI	GROMOV AIRLINE
- Founded: 4 October 1995 (as Gromov Air)
- Ceased operations: August 2014
- Operating bases: Moscow Domodedovo Airport; Moscow Zhukovsky Airport
- Fleet size: 15
- Headquarters: Zhukovsky, Moscow, Russia
- Key people: Mikhail Alexeev (CEO)
- Website: www.moskovia.aero

Moskovia Airlines (Russian: Авиакомпания Московия, romanized: Aviakompaniya Moskoviya) was an airline based in Zhukovsky, Moscow, Russia. It operated domestic and international passenger and cargo charters. Its main base was Domodedovo Airport.

== History ==
=== Development ===
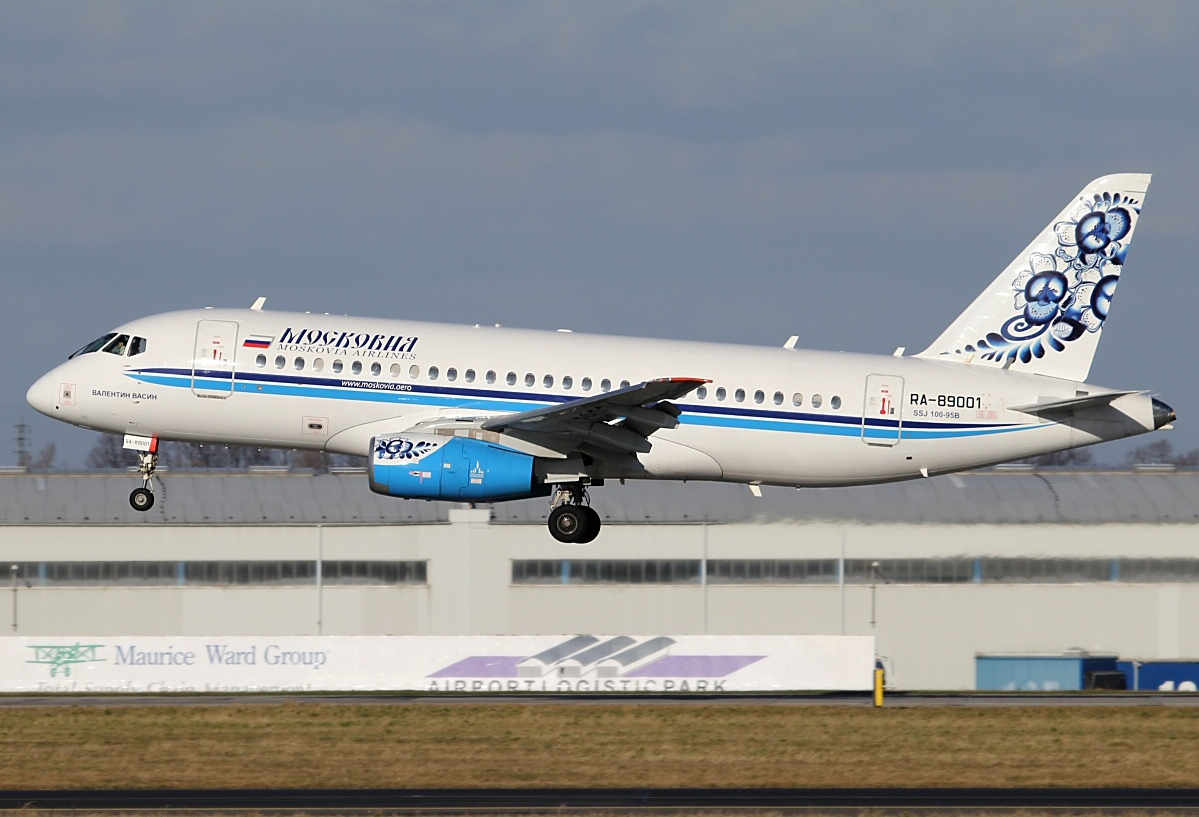
A Moskovia Airlines Sukhoi Superjet 100 at Prague Ruzyne Airport in 2014. Moskovia introduced the type in 2013. At least one aircraft of the type that had been operated by Moskovia entered serviced with Red Wings Airlines.

The airline was established on 4 October 1995 as a wholly owned commercial subsidiary of the Gromov Flight Research Institute and named Gromov Air, which was registered on 10 October the same year. In its beginnings the carrier operated cargo flights only; regular scheduled passenger services commenced in 2000. The airline was renamed Moskovia Airlines in 2006. Russian-manufactured aircraft (An-12s, An-24s, Tupolev Tu-134s, Tu-154s and Yak-40s) made up the fleet until 2009, when leased Boeing 737s were phased in. The Sukhoi Superjet 100 was incorporated into the fleet in 2013.

=== Grounding ===
Moskovia Airlines filed for bankruptcy in February 2014 but planned to continue its operations. Delays with flights returning passengers from the Montenegrin resort of Tivat and also with services from Astrakhan to Turkey were revealed in mid-July 2014; at this time, it was informed the airline was unable to pay for the fuel. An inspection that came after these delays resulted in the Russia's Federal Air Transport Agency Rosaviatsia suspending the commercialisation of tickets and the airline shrinking its operations to serve just the Moscow–Tivat route. That month, it was reported that the company would apparently continue its operations as a charter airline.

In August 2014, Rosaviatsia suspended the Moskovias's air operator's certificate (AOC) following the carrier's CEO stating the carrier could no longer operate due to financial difficulties. One of the causes for the suspension of the AOC responded to the fact that Moskovia did not meet the Russian regulations for the minimum number of aircraft to operate scheduled passenger services. After three months of suspension, the AOC was finally cancelled in December 2014.

== Destinations ==
This is a list of destinations served by Moscovia Airlines (as of December 2013):

=== Asia ===
Armenia

- Yerevan – Zvartnots International Airport

Azerbaijan

- Ganja – Ganja International Airport

Turkey

- Antalya – Antalya Airport

Uzbekistan

- Bukhara – Bukhara International Airport
- Fergana – Fergana Airport
- Karshi – Karshi Airport
- Namangan – Namangan Airport
- Navoiy – Navoiy International Airport
- Samarkand – Samarkand International Airport

=== Europe ===
Bosnia and Herzegovina

- Sarajevo – Sarajevo International Airport

Czech Republic

- Prague – Prague Václav Havel Airport

Germany

- Berlin – Berlin-Tegel Airport
- Munich – Munich International Airport

Montenegro

- Tivat – Tivat Airport

Russia

- Belgorod – Belgorod Airport
- Moscow – Domodedovo Airport Base
- Stavropol – Shpakovskoye Airport

== Fleet ==
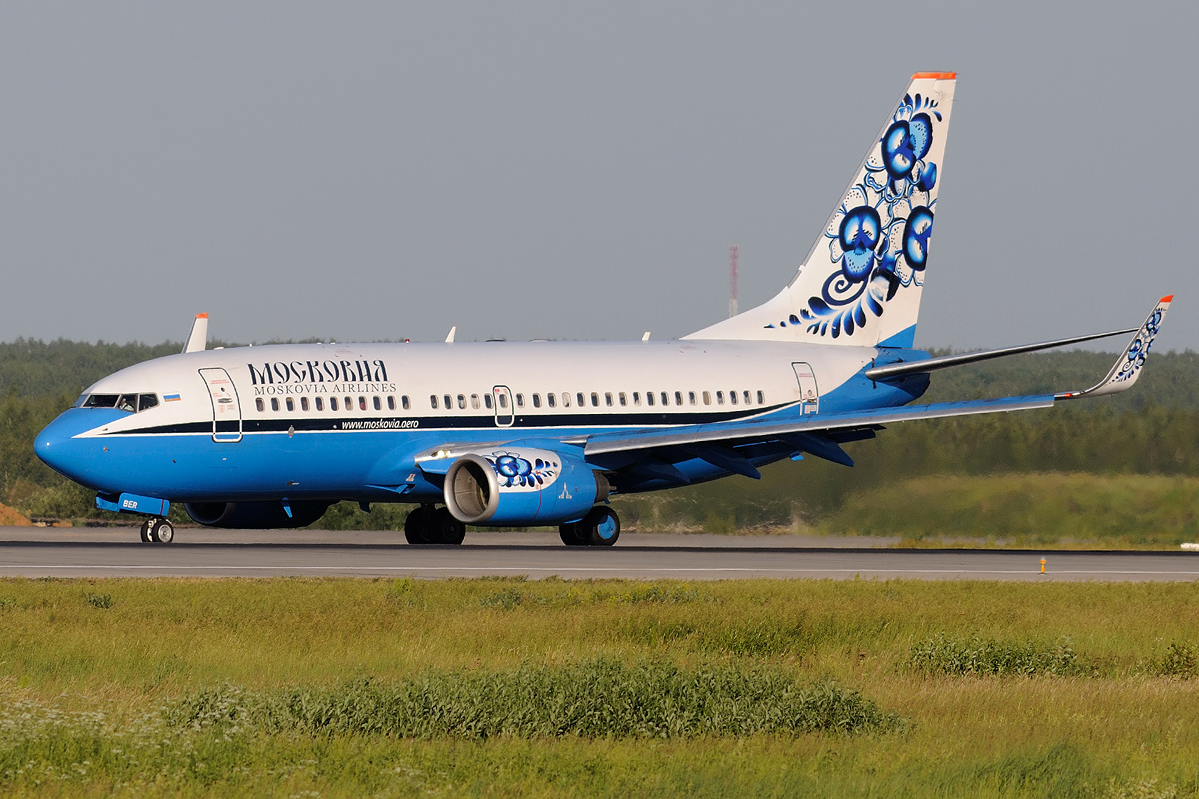
A Moskovia Airlines Boeing 737-700 at Domodedovo Airport in 2011. At July 2014, the airline had two aircraft of the type in its fleet.

The Moskovia Airlines fleet includes the following (as of January 2014):

Moskovia Airlines Fleet
Aircraft	In Fleet	Orders	Notes
Antonov An-12BK	3	0	
Antonov An-148B	0	3	
Boeing 737-700	2	0	
Sukhoi Superjet 100	2	2	Two options. Two ready to enter in service.
Total	5	6	

The airline also used to operate three Boeing 737-800, but they were returned to lessors in March 2011.

== Incidents and accidents ==
- On 26 May 2008, a Moscovia Airlines An-12 cargo aircraft crashed near Chelyabinsk, Russia, killing all nine crew members.

== See also ==
- Transport in Russia
