= Ryazanaviatrans =

Russian airline

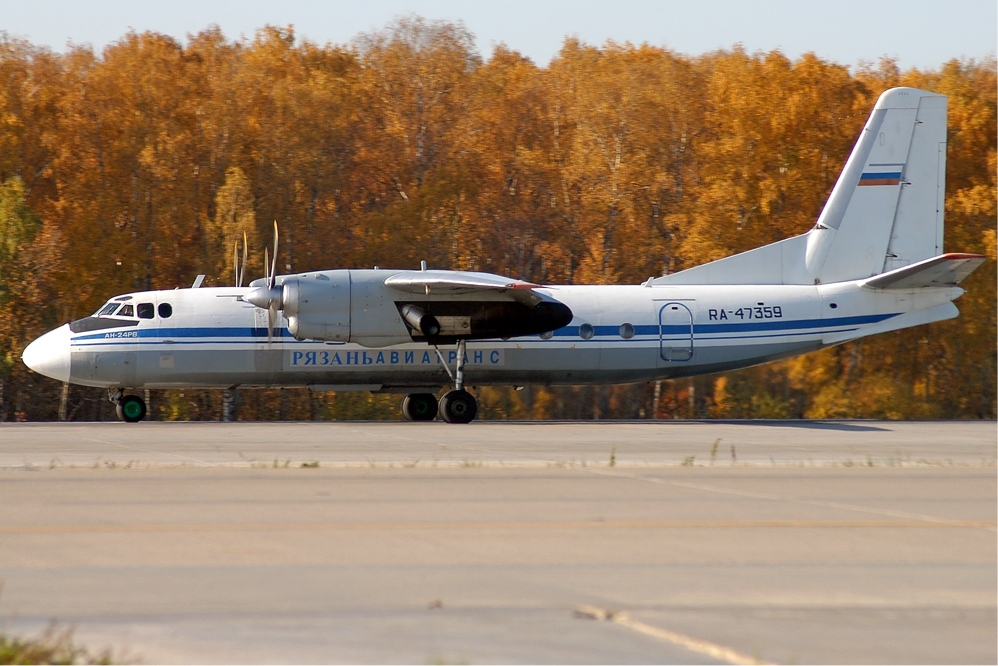
- Ryazanaviatrans Antonov An-24
IATA	ICAO	Call sign
-	RYX	Ryazan
- Commenced operations: 1992
- Ceased operations: October 31, 2012
- Operating bases: Turlatovo Airport
- Fleet size: 2 Antonov An-24

Ryazanaviatrans was an airline based in Turlatovo, Ryazan, Russia. It operated scheduled and charter regional feeder flights.

== Code data ==
- ICAO Code: RYZ
- Callsign: Ryazan

== History ==
The airline was established in 1992. On 31 October 2012, it was ordered to cease operations due to increased safety regulations. At that time, its aircraft fleet consisted of two Antonov An-24.
