= Atlant-Soyuz Airlines =

Russian airline (1993–2011)

IATA	ICAO	Call sign
7B	~~AYZ~~; MOA	~~ATLANT-SOYUZ~~; MOSCOW AIRLINES
- Founded: 1993
- Ceased operations: 2011
- Hubs: Vnukovo International Airport
- Fleet size: 15 (upon closure)
- Destinations: 12 (upon closure)
- Headquarters: Moscow, Russia
- Key people: Valery Evgenevich Menitsky (Chairman of the Board); Vladimir Vasilievich Davidov (General Director)
- Employees: 726
- Website: www.flymoscow.ru (defunct)

Atlant-Soyuz Airlines (Russian: Авиакомпания Атлант-Союз), known as Moscow Airlines (Russian: Авиакомпания Москва) during 2010–2011, was an airline based in Moscow, Russia, that operated domestic and international passenger flights out of Vnukovo International Airport from 1993 to 2011.

== History ==
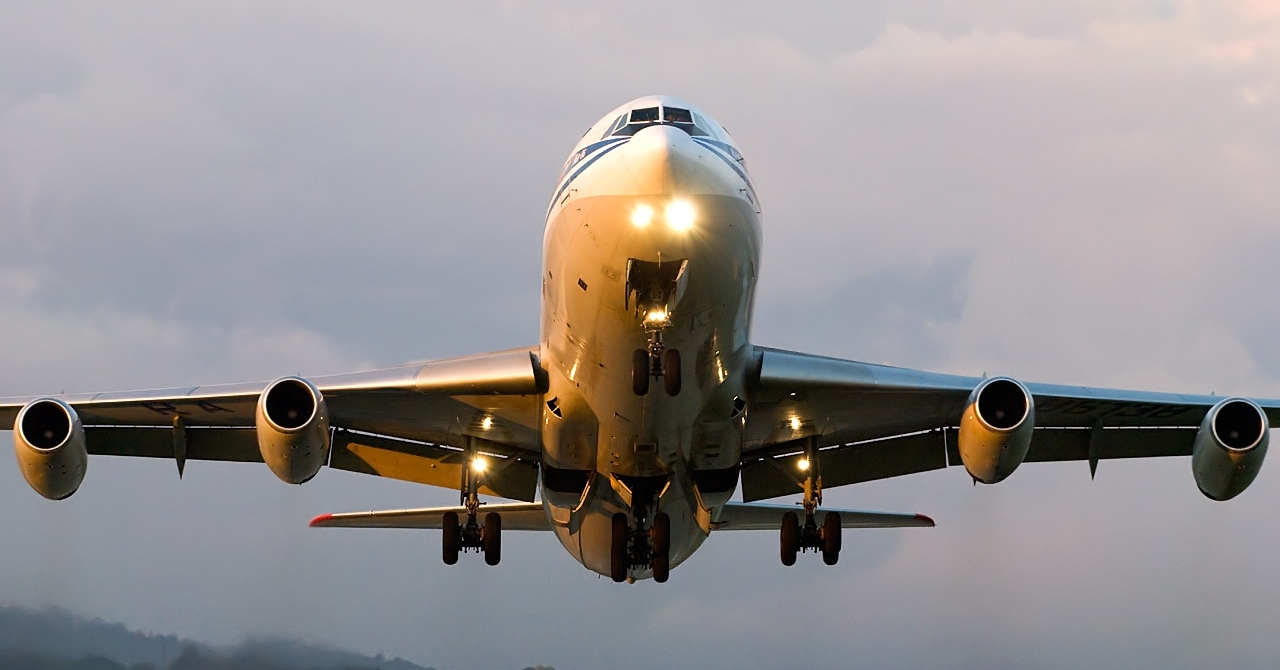
An Atlant-Soyuz Ilyushin Il-86 at Sochi International Airport in 2010.

OJSC Atlant-Soyuz Airlines was founded and started operations in June 1993, offering passenger and cargo flights using Soviet-build aircraft. The first Boeing airplane was added to the fleet in 2006. In 2007, the company was owned by private investors (75 percent) and the City of Moscow (25 percent) and had 726 employees. Initial plans for a joint-venture with US-based cargo airline Evergreen International Airlines were brought forth in 2007, but never materialized.

The short-lived Moscow Airlines logo.

On 17 September 2010, the airline was rebranded as Moscow Airlines. Following this step, all Ilyushin Il-76 cargo aircraft were removed from the fleet, marking the end of dedicated cargo flights. On 17 January 2011, Moscow Airlines discontinued all flight activities, and the company went into liquidation.

== Destinations ==
In December 2010, Moscow Airlines served the following scheduled destinations:

- Azerbaijan
  - Ganja - Ganja Airport
  - Nakhchivan - Nakhchivan Airport
- Czech Republic
  - Brno - Brno-Tuřany Airport
- Russia
  - Gelendzhik - Gelendzhik Airport
  - Moscow - Vnukovo International Airport hub
  - Sochi - Sochi International Airport
- Tajikistan
  - Dushanbe - Dushanbe Airport
- Uzbekistan
  - Bukhara - Bukhara International Airport
  - Fergana - Fergana Airport
  - Samarkand - Samarkand Airport
  - Tashkent - Tashkent International Airport

== Fleet ==
Moscow Airlines operated the following aircraft:

Moscow Airlines fleet
Aircraft	Total	Orders	Passengers			
Aircraft	Total	Orders	C	Y+	Y	Total
Ilyushin Il-86	5	—	0	0	350	350
Tupolev Tu-154M	2	—	8; 0	0; 0	150; 176	158; 176

== Aircraft gallery ==
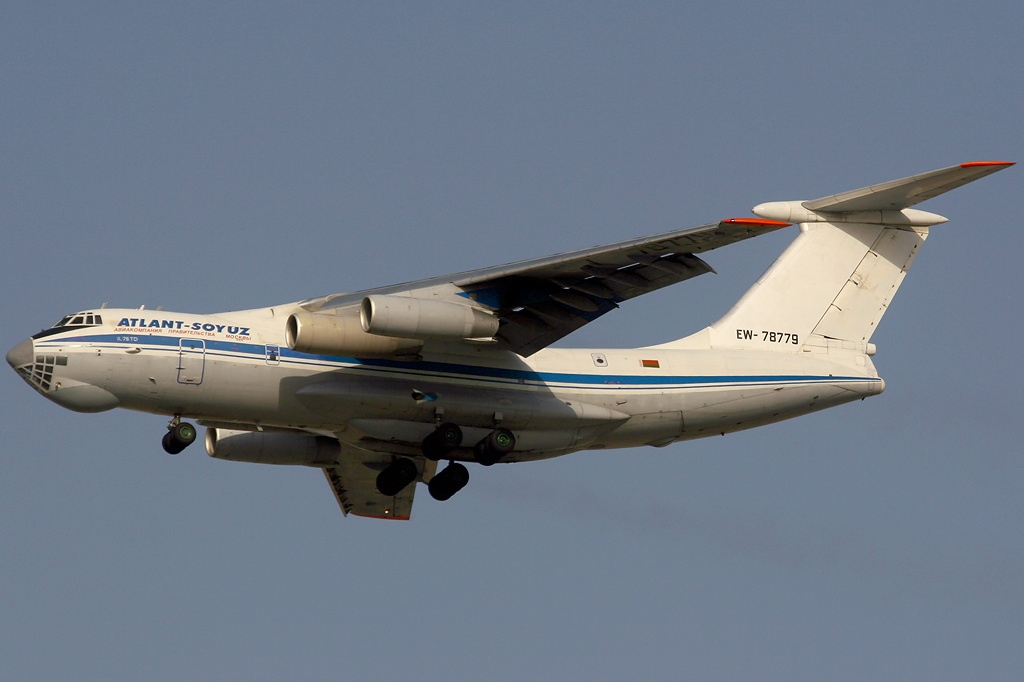
An Ilyushin Il-76 approaching Dubai International Airport in 2007, painted in the original colors of Atlant-Soyuz.

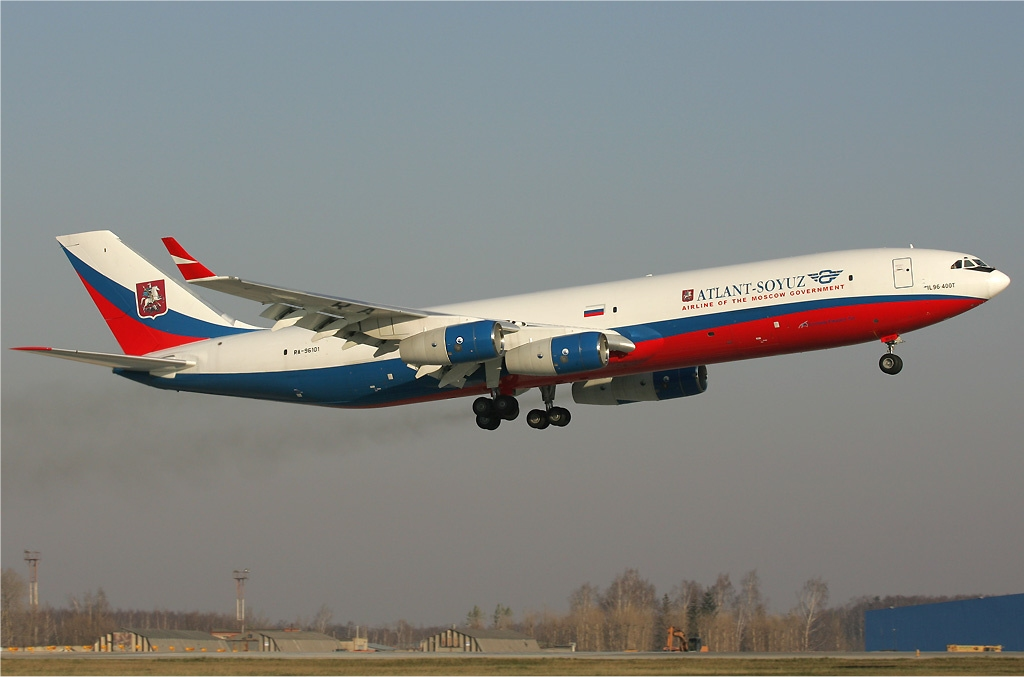
An Ilyushin Il-96 landing at Domodedovo International Airport in 2008, featuring the latest livery variant.

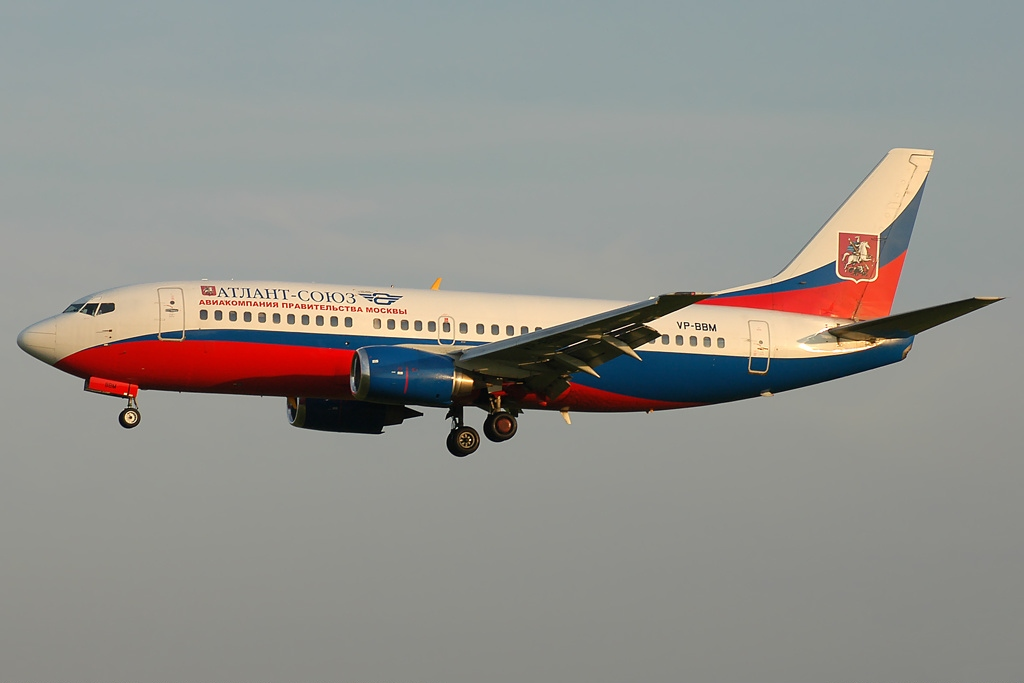
A Boeing 737-300 approaching Moscow-Vnukovo Airport in 2009.

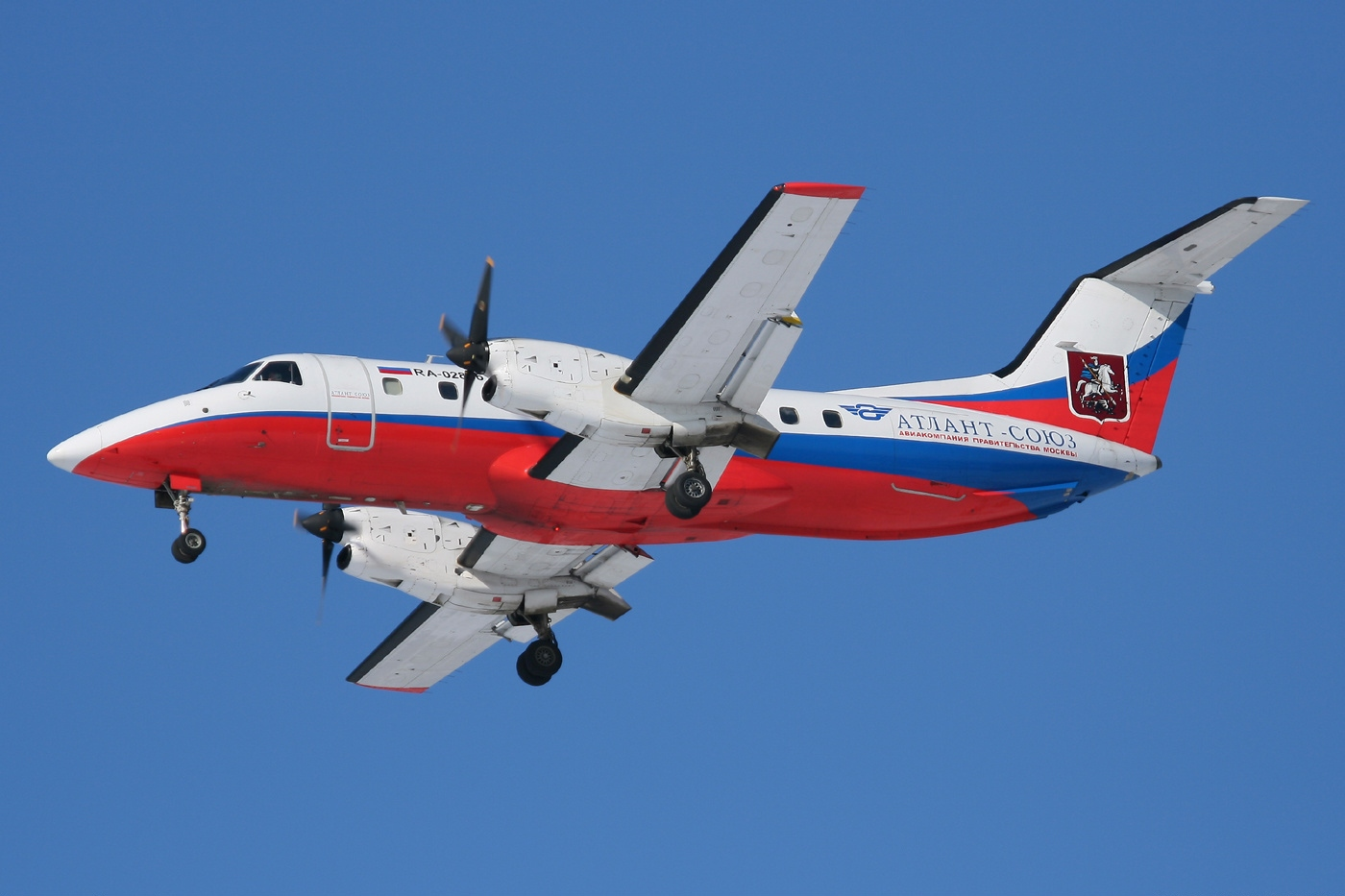
An Embraer EMB 120 Brasilia at Vnukovo Airport in 2009.

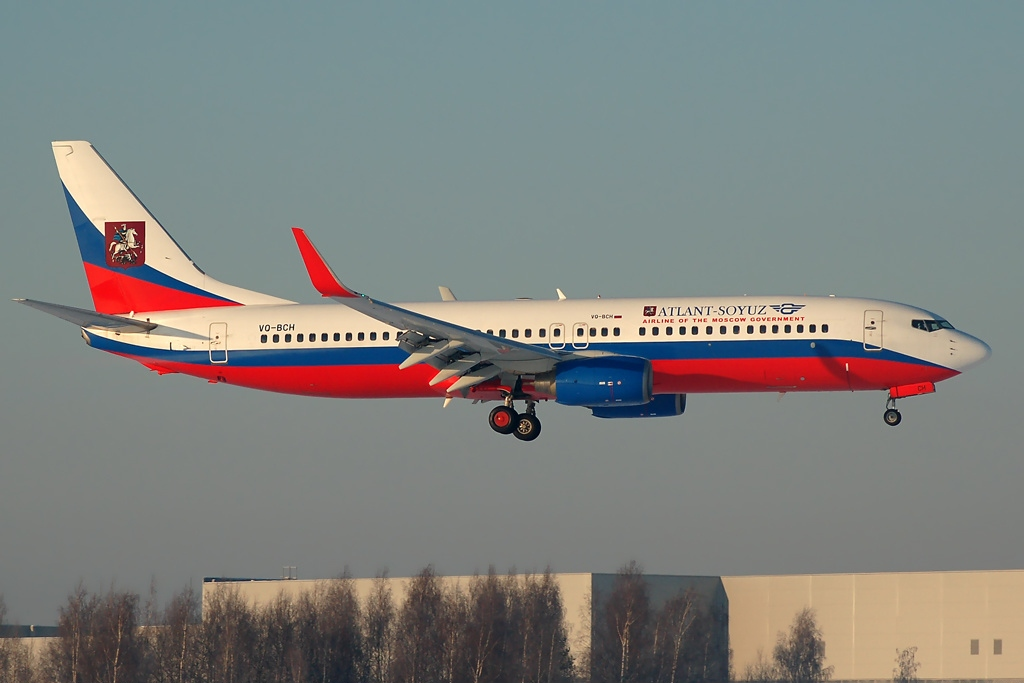
A Boeing 737-800 approaching Vnukovo Airport in 2010.

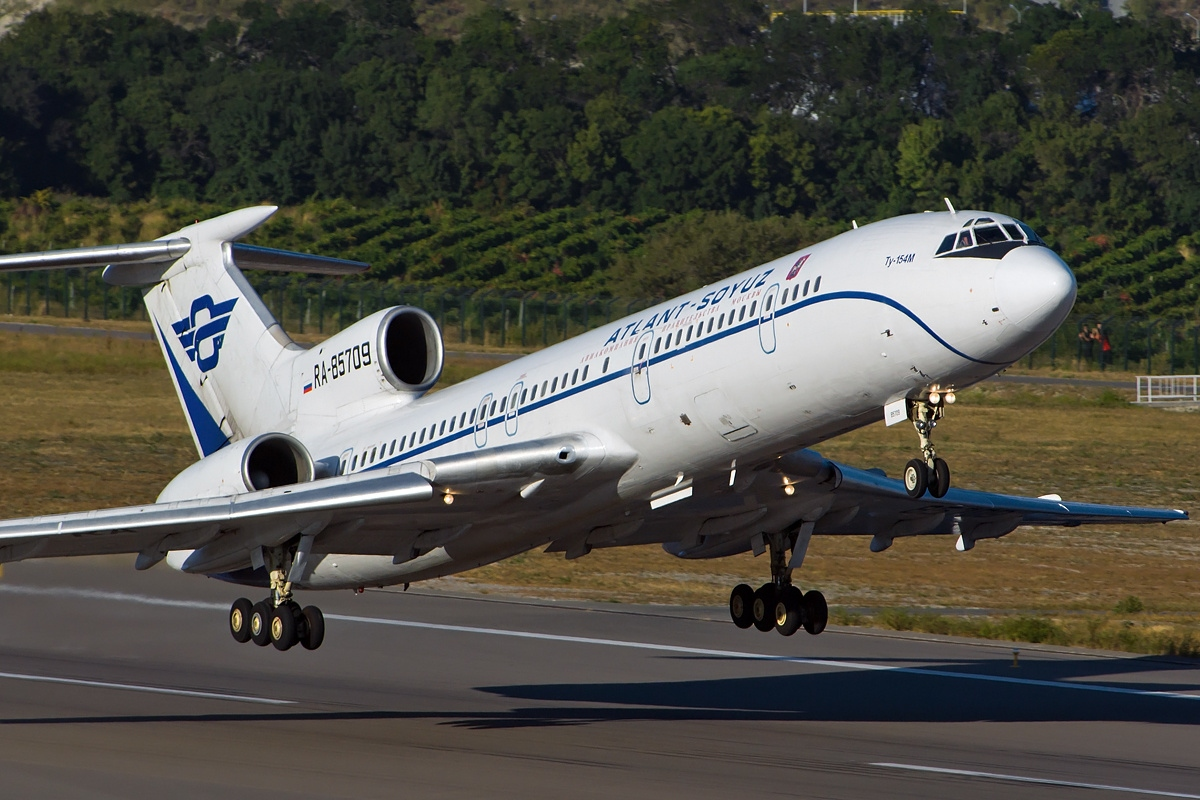
A Tupolev Tu-154 at Gelendzhik Airport in 2010.
