= Dauria (airline) =

Russian regional airline

- Founded: 1997; 29 years ago
- Ceased operations: 2010; 16 years ago
- Hubs: Chita, Russia
- Fleet size: 2
- Destinations: 3
- Headquarters: Chita, Russia

Dauria was a Russian regional airline based in Chita which also carried out aerial work and aircraft maintenance. It went bankrupt in 2010 with debts of over 31 million roubles.

== Destinations ==
Before bankruptcy, Dauria flew to:

- Irkutsk
- Chara
- Chita (Kadala Airport)

== Fleet ==
Aircraft type	Active	Notes
Antonov An-2	2	Sold in attempt to recover debt, 2008
Antonov An-24	2	Sold by bailiffs, 2010

Six partially dismantled Antonov An-2 aircraft were sold at auction in 2008 with the remaining two Antonov An-24 aircraft sold by the bailiffs in 2010.

The airline had previously operated Antonov An-26 aircraft.
