= BAL Bashkirian Airlines =

Russian airline (1991–2007)

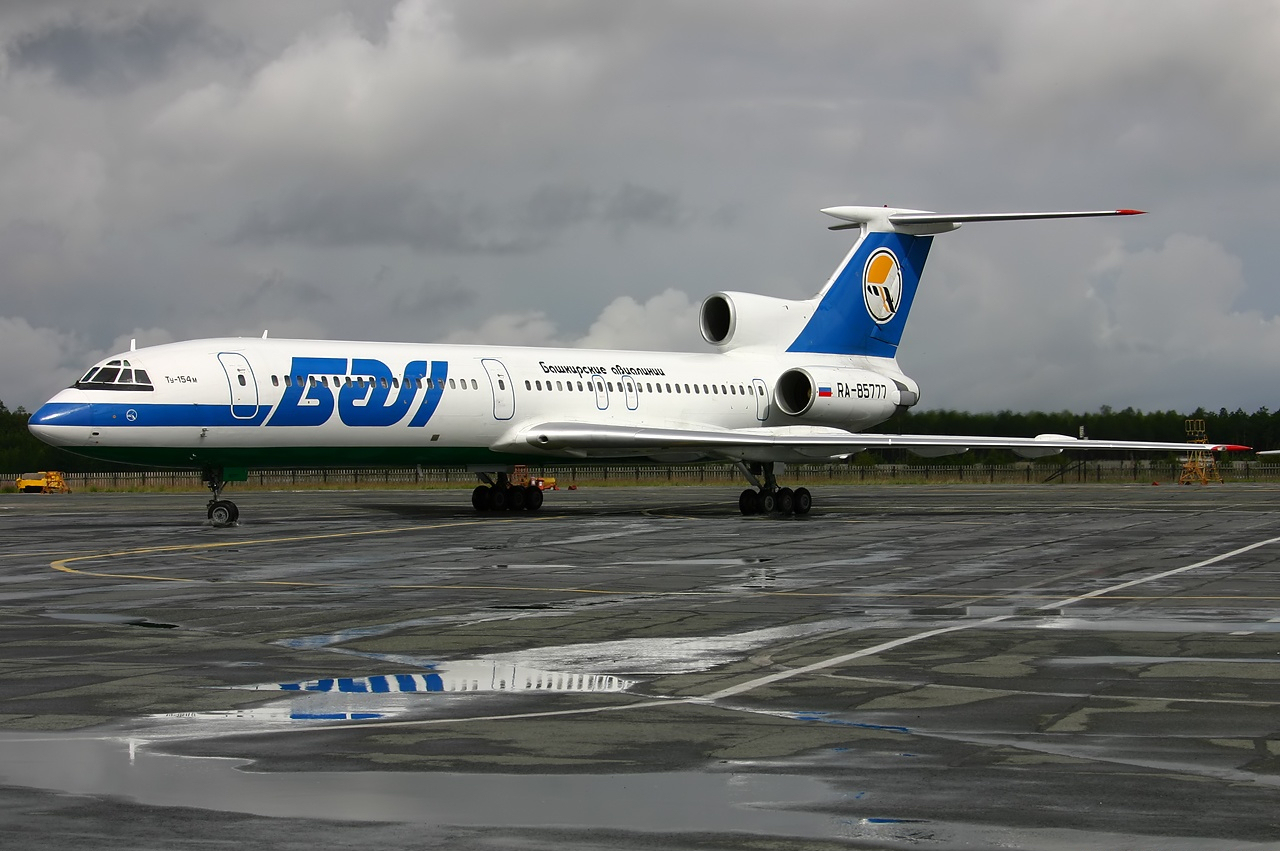
IATA	ICAO	Call sign
V9	BTC	BASHKIRIAN
- Founded: 1991
- Ceased operations: April 2007
- Hubs: Ufa International Airport
- Focus cities: Moscow Domodedovo Airport
- Frequent-flyer program: BAL+
- Destinations: 19
- Parent company: Government of Bashkortostan (100%)
- Headquarters: Ufa International Airport, Ufa, Russia
- Website: bal.ufanet.ru

BAL Bashkirian Airlines (Russian: «Башкирские авиалинии»; Bashkir: БАЛ Башҡортостан авиалиниялары, romanized: BAL Başqortostan Avialiniyaları) was an airline which operated at its head office at Ufa International Airport in Ufa, Bashkortostan, Russia. It operated regional and trunk routes within Russia, as well as charter services to Europe, Asia and North Africa. The company was founded in 1991 and liquidated in 2007.

== History ==
The airline was founded in 1991, originally set up as an Aeroflot division and was formerly part of the Samara-based Aerovolga. It began to make permanent domestic and foreign connections and charter flights to Cairo, Tunis and Barcelona.

In October 2006, the airline lost its air operator's certificate after intense security renovations with the Ministry of Transport. In April 2007, Bashkirian Airlines filed for bankruptcy and ceased operations. It had 1,513 employees at the time of its dissolution.

== Destinations ==
Bashkirian Airlines operated the following services:

Country	City	Airport	Notes
Armenia	Yerevan	Zvartnots International Airport	Charter
Azerbaijan	Baku	Heydar Aliyev International Airport	
Egypt	Cairo	Cairo International Airport	Charter
Egypt	Hurghada	Hurghada International Airport	Charter
Egypt	Sharm El Sheikh	Sharm El Sheikh International Airport	Charter
France	Paris	Charles de Gaulle Airport	
Netherlands	Amsterdam	Amsterdam Airport Schiphol	
Russia	Moscow	Moscow Domodedovo Airport	Focus city
Russia	Nadym	Nadym Airport	
Russia	Nizhnevartovsk	Nizhnevartovsk Airport	
Russia	Novy Urengoy	Novy Urengoy Airport	
Russia	Saint Petersburg	Pulkovo Airport	
Russia	Samara	Kurumoch International Airport	
Russia	Surgut	Surgut International Airport	
Russia	Ufa	Ufa International Airport	Hub
Spain	Barcelona	Josep Tarradellas Barcelona–El Prat Airport	
Tajikistan	Dushanbe	Dushanbe International Airport	
Tunisia	Tunis	Tunis–Carthage International Airport	Charter
Turkey	Istanbul	Istanbul Atatürk Airport	

== Fleet ==
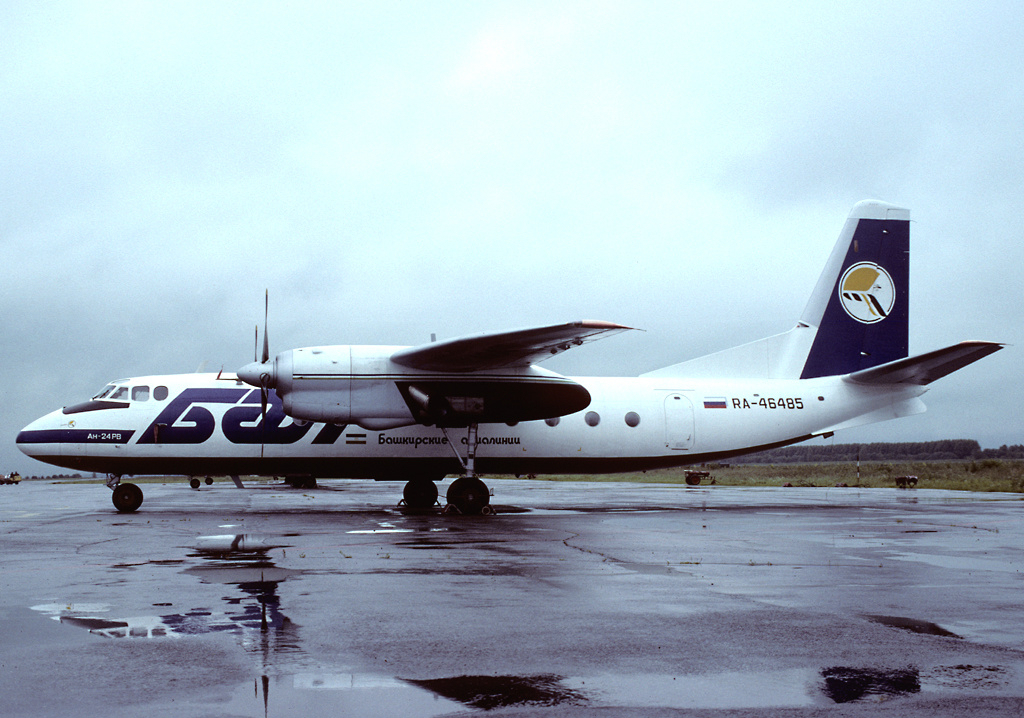
A Bashkirian Antonov An-24 parked at Ufa International Airport in 1994

Bashkirian Airlines consisted of the following aircraft:

Aircraft	Total	Introduced	Retired	Notes
Antonov An-2TP	1	1992	1999	
Antonov An-24B	6	1993	2001	
Antonov An-24RV	4	1994	2001	
Antonov An-28	6	1992	1997	
Antonov An-74	5	1997	2005	
Mil Mi-8T	1	Unknown	Unknown	
Mil Mi-34	1	Unknown	Unknown	
Tupolev Tu-134A	10	1993	2005	
Tupolev Tu-154B	10	1994	2007	
Tupolev Tu-154M	13	1994	2007	One crashed as Flight 2937

== Accident ==
On July 1, 2002, Bashkirian Airlines Flight 2937, a Tupolev Tu-154M (registered as RA-85816) was on a charter flight from Moscow, Russia, to Barcelona, Spain. The plane was flying over southern Germany when it collided with a DHL International Boeing 757-200PF, flying from Bergamo, Italy, to Brussels, Belgium, over the city of Überlingen near the German-Swiss border. The DHL plane’s tail slammed into the fuselage of the Tupolev Tu-154. The collision killed the 2 crew members on board the Boeing 757, and all 69 passengers and crew on the Tupolev, mostly Russian schoolchildren from Bashkortostan on a vacation, organized by the local UNESCO committee, to the Costa Dorada region of Spain.

== See also ==
- List of defunct airlines of Russia
