= VIM Airlines =

Russian airline (2000–2017)

IATA	ICAO	Call sign
NN	MOV	MOV AIR
- Founded: 2000
- Ceased operations: 16 October 2017
- Hubs: Domodedovo International Airport; Vnukovo International Airport
- Fleet size: 28
- Destinations: 50
- Headquarters: Moscow, Russia
- Key people: Alexander Kochnev (Director General); Rashid Mursekaev (President, owner)
- Website: vim-avia.com

VIM Airlines (legally VIM Avia) was a Russian charter airline headquartered in Moscow based at Domodedovo International Airport. It offered international scheduled and charter operations for both passengers and cargo as well as wet lease services. Its licence was revoked by 4 November 2017 after its operations were suspended a few weeks earlier.

== History ==
VIM Airlines was established by Viktor Ivanovich Merkulov (hence the name of the company) and started operations in 2000, with an Ilyushin Il-62M. At the end of 2004, the company acquired Chitaavia and Aerobratsk, followed by Russian Sky Airlines in 2005.

On 28 September 2017, CEO Alexander Cochnev and Chief Accountant Yekaterina Panteleyeva were arrested after an embezzlement case against the employers of the company.

In late September 2017, VIM Airlines' aircraft were seized at foreign airports and several routes were cancelled, including all operations from its home base Moscow-Domodedovo. The airline's aircraft were seized by lessors in Turkey following ongoing investigations by the Russian authorities. The airline suspended all charter operations in September 2017 and suspended all scheduled operations on 15 October 2017. On 4 November 2017, the airline's license was revoked by Russian authorities as the airline was unable to resume flights.

== Fleet ==
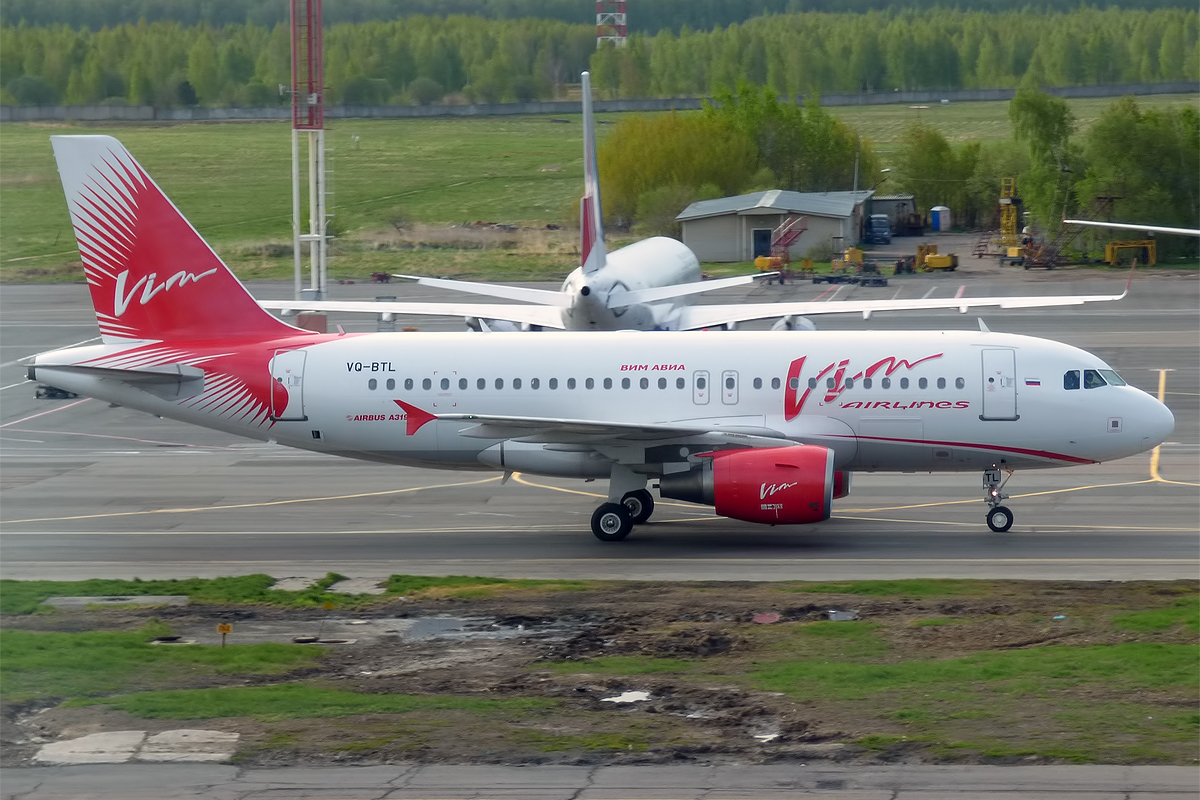
VIM Airlines Airbus A319-100

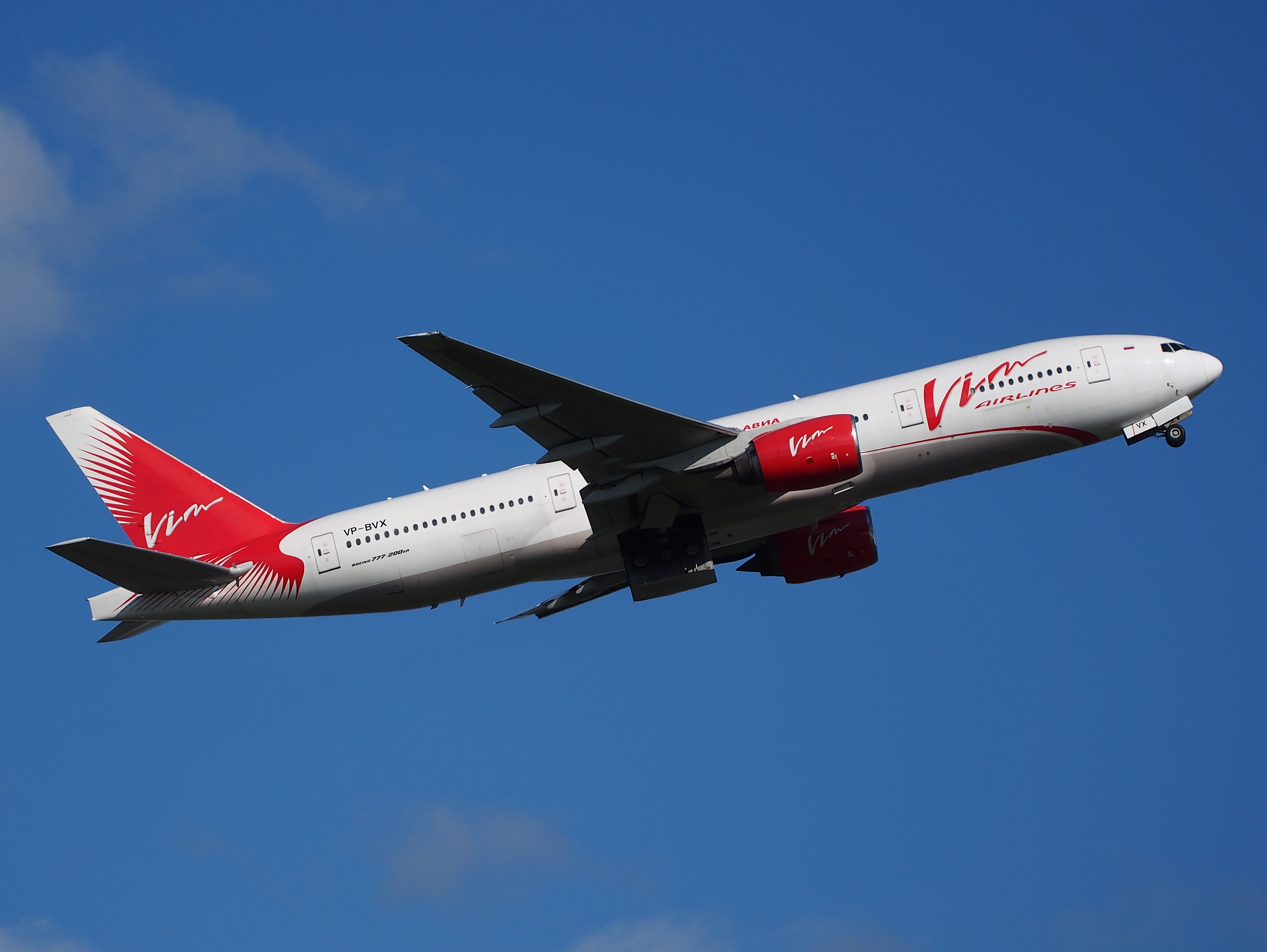
VIM Airlines Boeing 777-200ER

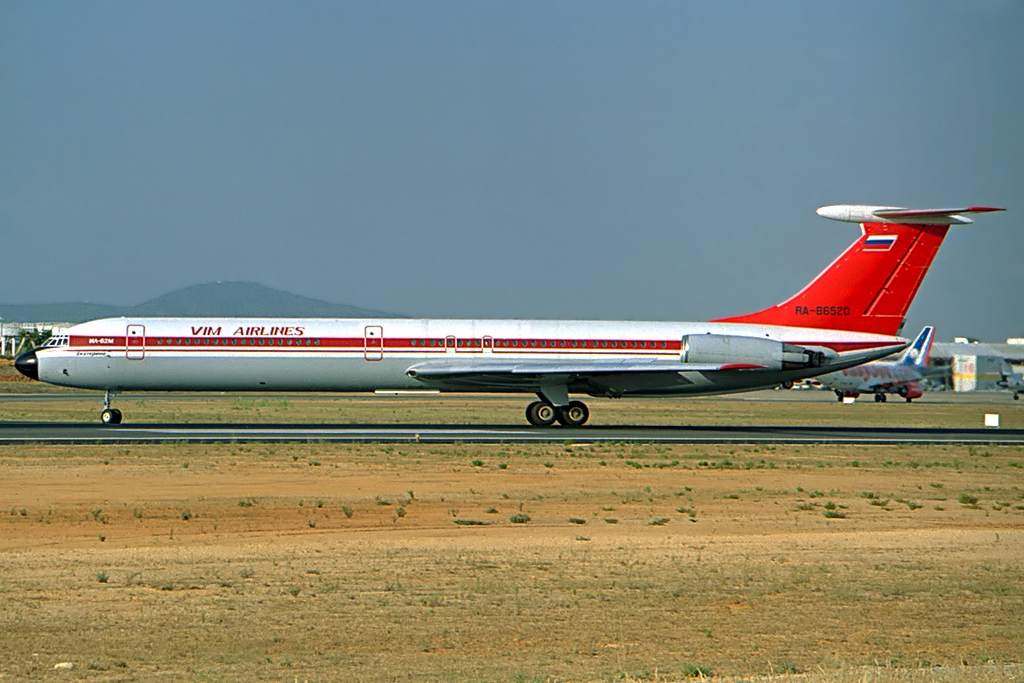
A now-retired Ilyushin Il-62M, VIM Airlines' first aircraft

=== Former fleet ===
As of 23 September 2017, the VIM Airlines fleet consisted of the following aircraft:

VIM Airlines fleet
Aircraft	In service	Orders	Passengers			Notes
Aircraft	In service	Orders	C	Y	Total	Notes
Airbus A319-100	4	—	–	150	150	
Airbus A330-200	2	—	24	228	252	
Boeing 757-200	3	—	–	220	220	
Boeing 767-300ER	2	—	12	259	271	
Boeing 777-200ER	10	—	35	247	282	
Boeing 777-200ER	10	—	30	293	323	
Boeing 777-300ER	2	—	42	386	428	
Total	23	—				

=== Retired fleet ===
VIM Airlines previously operated the following aircraft:

- Ilyushin Il-62M
- Tupolev Tu-154 (leased from Aviaprad)
- Yakovlev Yak-42 (leased from KrasAir)

== See also ==
- List of defunct airlines of Russia
