= Skynet (airline) =

Skynet.Aero
- Founded: 2008; 18 years ago
- Hubs: Krasnoyarsk Airport
- Fleet size: 5
- Destinations: 14
- Headquarters: Krasnoyarsk, Russia
- Website: http://www.skynet.aero/

Skynet.Aero (Russian: Авиакомпания «Скайнет» – Aviakompaniya “Skaynet”) is a regional airline based at the Krasnoyarsk Airport. The airline makes regular flights to Norilsk, Abakan, Novosibirsk, Irkutsk, Khabarovsk, Petropavlovsk-Kamchatsky, Magadan and Anadyr. In April 2011 it opened flights from Norilsk to Ufa and Kazan.

== History ==
Skynet Airline was founded in April 2010, as rebranded Krasnoyarsk transport company, which has been known since 2006 as an operator of charter flights, flying Ilyushin Il-76, Antonov An-74 and Yakovlev Yak-42D within Russia and abroad.

== Destinations ==
During the 2011 summer season Skynet was flying to the following destinations:

- Abakan
- Chita
- Irkutsk
- Kazan
- Khabarovsk
- Krasnoyarsk
- Magadan
- Norilsk
- Novosibirsk
- Petropavlovsk-Kamchatsky
- Ufa

== Fleet ==
As of April 15, 2011, Skynet operates the following aircraft types:

| Aircraft | In fleet | Passengers | Notes |
|---|---|---|---|
Passenger
| Antonov An-74 | | 52 | |
| Antonov An-148 | 2 orders | TBA | |
| Yakovlev Yak-42D | 5 | 120 | |
Cargo
| Ilyushin Il-76 | | N/A | 50T cargo |
