= Babyflot =

Airline created from the 1994 breakup of the Soviet flag carrier Aeroflot

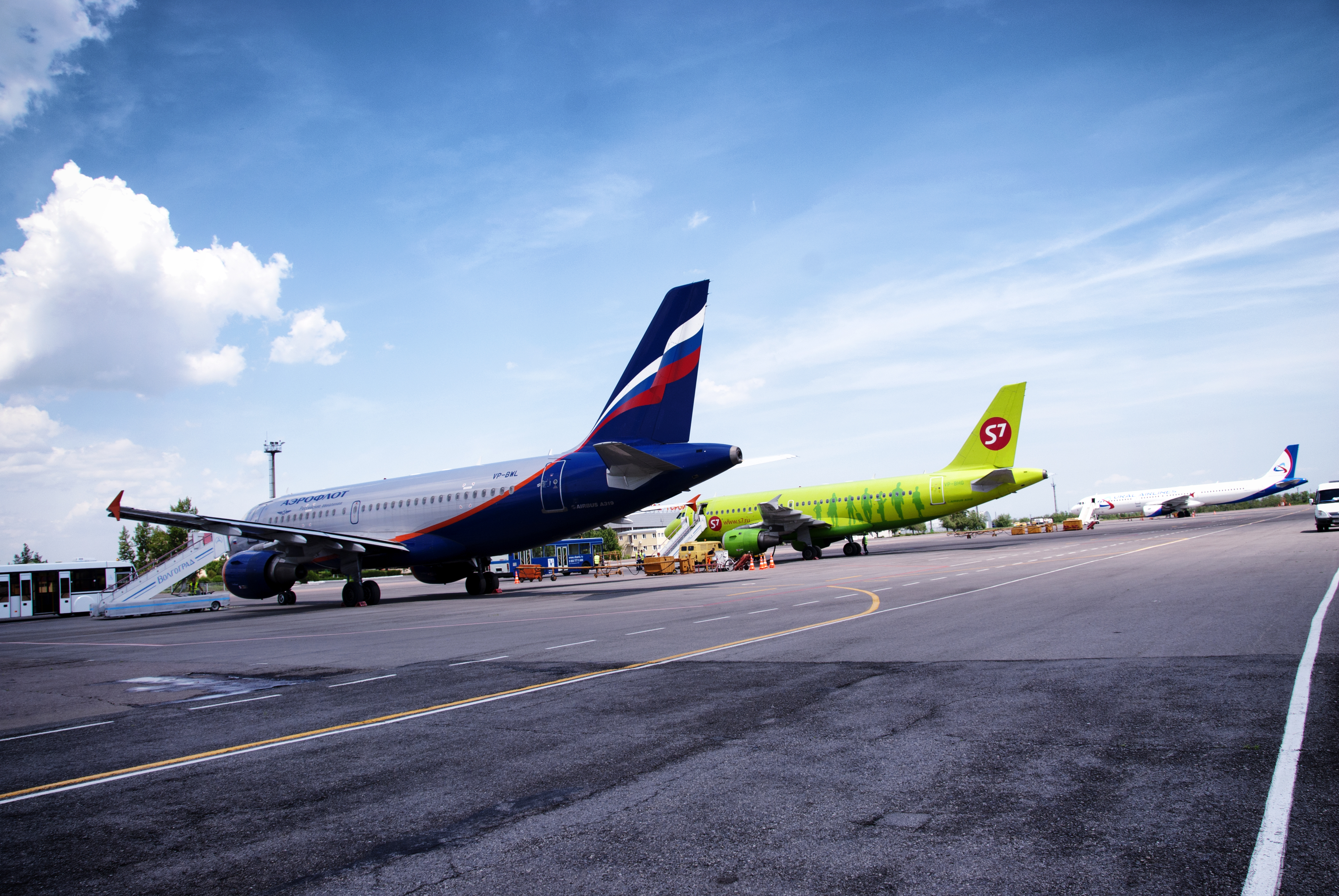
Besides the contemporary Aeroflot, S7 Airlines and Ural Airlines are major "Babyflots" or their major reorganizations that are still existing in Russia.

Babyflot is the informal name given to any airline in the former Soviet Union created in the early 1990s from the dissolution of Aeroflot as part of the breakup of the Soviet Union. The word is a portmanteau of baby and Aeroflot (compare Baby Bells).

There were between 300 and 800 Babyflots, with many being single-plane operations, while international routes were operated separately as Aeroflot—Russian International Airlines (ARIA). By 1994, many Babyflots were bankrupt, hampered by a lack of capital and a poor economy, which in turn led to abysmal safety records. These safety issues had become so endemic to the "Babyflot" airlines that in 1994 the International Air Transport Association took the unusual step of recommending trains for people traveling the former Soviet Union, as it was considered the least life-threatening form of conveyance.

In 1998, Russia had 315 airlines but expected the number to drop to 8 federal air carriers and 40 to 45 regional airlines by 2000 as the government began restricting licensing and certification and bring air-safety standards into compliance with international standards.

== List of notable Babyflots ==
Some Babyflots are now flag carriers of former Soviet countries, such as Uzbekistan Airlines.

Name	Original Aeroflot Subdivision and Home Airport	Status as of 2025	Comment
2nd Arkhangelsk United Aviation Division	2nd Arkhangelsk UAD of Arkhangelsk ACA, Vaskovo	Active	
2nd Sverdlovsk Air Enterprise	2nd Sverdlovsk UAD of Ural ACA, Ukrus	Defunct (2011)	
Abakan Avia	Abakan UAD of Krasnoyarsk ACA, Abakan	Defunct (2024)	Rebranded as Royal Flight in 2014
Abkhazian Airlines	Sukhumi UAD of Georgian ACA, Babushara	Active	
Aeroflot	Central Administration of International Air Traffic, Sheremetyevo	Active	
Air Kharkov	Kharkov UAD of Ukrainian ACA, Kharkiv	Defunct (2018)	
Air Moldova	Various UADs of Moldavian ACA	Defunct (2023)	
Air Ukraine	Various UADs of Ukrainian ACA	Defunct (2004)	
Air Volga	Volgograd UAD of North Caucasian ACA, Gumrak	Defunct (2010)	Also known as VolgaAviaExpress. Acquired by RusLine in 2010 with RusLine adopting Air Volga branding.
Airzena	Tbilisi UAD of Georgian ACA, Tbilisi	Active	Rebranded as Georgian Airways in 2004
Arkhangelsk Airlines	1st Arkhangelsk UAD of Arkhangelsk ACA, Talagi	Active	Was a subsidiary of Aeroflot under name "Aeroflot-Nord" in 2004–2009, renamed Nordavia in 2009, rebranded as Smartavia in 2019
Armenian Airlines	1st and 2nd Yerevan UADs of Armenian ACA, Zvartnots	Defunct (2004)	Not to be confused with active company with same name operating since 2022
ARP 410 Airlines	Kiev Aviation Industrial Association "50 years of October" of Ministry of Aviation Industry, Sviatoshyn	Defunct (2007)	
ATRAN	Moscow Air Enterprise of Ministry of Aviation Industry, Zakharkovo, Myachkovo, Zhukovsky, Domodedovo	Active	
Azerbaijan Airlines	Various UADs of Azerbaijan ACA	Active	
Baikal Airlines	Irkutsk UAD of East-Siberian ACA	Defunct (2001)	Acquired by Siberia Airlines in 2001
BAL Bashkirian Airlines	Ufa UAD of Privolzhye ACA, Ufa	Defunct (2007)	
Belavia	Various UADs of Belarusian ACA	Active	
Belgorod Air Enterprise	Belgorod UAD of ACA of Central regions, Belgorod	Defunct (2005)	
Bravia (Bryansk Air Enterprise)	Bryansk UAD of ACA of Central regions, Bryansk	Defunct (2006)	
Bugulma Air Enterprise	Bugulma UAC of Privolzhye ACA, Bugulma	Defunct (2015)	Rebranded as Ak Bars Aero in 2010
Buryatia Airlines (Bural)	Ulan-Ude UAD of East Siberian ACA, Ulan-Ude	Defunct (2016)	
ChitaAvia	Chita UAD of East Siberian ACA, Kadala	Defunct (2004)	Acquired by VIM Airlines in 2004
Dagestan Airlines	Makhachkala UAD of North Caucasian ACA, Uytash	Defunct (2011)	Rebranded as South East Airlines in 2010
Dalavia	Khabarovsk UAD, Far Eastern ACA, Khabarovsk-Novy	Defunct (2008)	
Domodedovo Airlines	Domodedovo Production association of Civil Aviation, Domodedovo	Defunct (2008)	Was part of AiRUnion alliance, which went bankrupt in 2008
Donavia	Rostov-on-Don UAC or North Caucasian ACA, Rostov-on-Don	Defunct (2016)	Purchased by Aeroflot in 2000, was branded as Aeroflot-Don in 2000–2009. Merged into Rossiya Airlines in 2016.
Estonian Air	Various UADs of Estonian ACA	Defunct (2015)	
FlyLAL-Lithuanian Airlines	Vilnius UAD of Lithuanian ACA, Vilnius	Defunct (2009)	
Gomelavia	Gomel UAD of Belarusian ACA, Gomel	Defunct (2011)	
Izhavia	Izhevsk UAD of Ural ACA, Izhevsk	Active	
Kavminvodyavia	Mineralnye Vody Production Association of Civil Aviation, Mineralnye Vody	Defunct (2011)	
Kazakhstan Airlines	Various UADs of Kazakh ACA	Defunct (1996)	Was declared bankrupt in 1996, with its assets transferred to newly founded Air Kazakhstan
Kazan Air Enterprise	2nd Kazan UAD of Privolzhye ACA, Kazan	Active	
Kemerovo Aviation Enterprise	Kemerovo UAD of West Siberian ACA, Kemerovo	Defunct (1997)	
Khakassia	Abakan UAD of Krasnoyarsk ACA, Abakan	Defunct (2003)	Acquired by Vladivostok Air in 2003
KomiAvia	Syktyvkar UAD of Komi ACA, Syktyvkar	Defunct (1998)	After bankruptcy in 1998, reorganized into Komiaviatrans
Kostroma Air Enterprise	Kostroma UAD of ACA of Central regions, Kostroma	Active	
KrasAir	Various UADs of Krasnoyarsk ACA	Defunct (2009)	Was part of AiRUnion alliance, which went bankrupt in 2008
Kuban Airlines	Krasnodar UAD of North Caucasian ACA, Pashkovsky	Defunct (2013)	
Kyrgyzstan Airlines	Various UADs of Kyrgyz ACA	Defunct (2005)	After bankruptcy in 2005 acquired by Altyn Air, which was rebranded as Kyrgyzstan Air Company in 2006
Latavio	Various UADs of Latvian ACA, including 1st Riga UAD at Skulte and 2nd Riga UAD at Spilve	Defunct (1996)	
Mavial Magadan Airlines	Magadan UAD of Magadan ACA, Sokol	Defunct (2007)	
Moldaeroservice	Beltsy UAD of Moldavian ACA, Bălți	Active	
Mirny Air Enterprise	Mirny UAD of Yakutian ACA, Mirny	Active	Rebranded as Alrosa in 1995
Murmansk Airlines	Murmansk UAD of Leningrad (Northern) ACA, Murmashi	Defunct (2018)	After bankruptcy in 1999 sold to Norilsk Nickel and reorganized as Murmansk Aviation Company, which only performed helicopter operations; rebranded as "Arktika" in 2015, ceased operations in 2018
Nefteyugansk Air Enterprise	Nefteyugansk UAD of Tyumen ACA, Nefteyugansk	Active	
Nikolaevsk-na-Amure Air Enterprise	Nikolaevsk-na-Amure UAD, Far Eastern ACA, Nikolayevsk-on-Amur	Defunct (2004)	
Nizhny Novgorod Airlines	Gorky UAD of Privolzhye ACA, Strigino	Defunct (2002)	
Norilsk Air Enterprise	Norilsk UAD of Krasnoyarsk ACA, Alykel	Defunct (2002)	After bankruptcy in 2002 split into multiple companies, including airlines Taymyr (later rebranded NordStar, active) and Zapolyariye (defunct in 2010)
Novosibirsk Air Enterprise	Novisibirsk UAD of West Siberian ACA, Novisibirsk-Severny	Defunct (2011)	
Omskavia	Omsk UAD of West Siberian ACA, Omsk-Central	Defunct (2009)	Was part of AiRUnion alliance, which went bankrupt in 2008
Orenair	Orenburg UAD of Privolzhye ACA, Orenburg-Central	Defunct (2016)	Acquired by Rossiya Airlines in 2016
Perm Airlines	Perm UAD of Ural ACA, Bolshoye Savino	Defunct (2009)	
Petropavlovsk-Kamchatsky Air Enterprise	Kamchatka UAD of Far Eastern ACA, Yelizovo	Active	
Pskovavia	Pskov UAD of Leningrad (Northern) ACA, Pskov	Defunct (2019)	
Pulkovo Airlines	Leningrad UAD, Leningrad (Northern) ACA, Pulkovo	Defunct (2006)	In 2006, reorganized into state transport company "Rossiya", which became Rossiya Airlines in 2011
Sakha Avia	Various UADs of Yakutian ACA	Defunct (2002)	Merged with Yakutian Airlines to form Air Company Yakutia.
Samara Airlines	Kuybyshev UAD of Privolzhye ACA, Kurumoch	Defunct (2009)	Was part of AiRUnion alliance, which went bankrupt in 2008
Saransk Air Enterprise	Saransk UAD of Privolzhye ACA, Saransk	Defunct (2013)	After bankruptcy in 2006, reorganized into Mordovia Airlines, which ceased operations in 2013
Saravia	Saratov UAD of Privolzhye ACA, Saratov-Central	Defunct (2018)	Later operated under names Ivolga, Saratov Airlines
SAT Airlines	Sakhalin UAD of Far Eastern ACA, Khomutovo	Defunct (2013)	Merged with Vladivostok Air to form Aurora, with Aurora inheriting ICAO code of SAT Airlines (SHU)
Siberia Airlines	Tolmachevo UAD of West Siberian ACA, Tolmachevo	Active	Rebranded as S7 Airlines in 2005
Stigl	Grozny UAD of North Caucasian ACA, Grozny	Defunct (1995)	Formed by separatist government of Chechen Republic of Ichkeria. Never obtained official registration from Russian or international aviation authorities, performed flights from Grozny to Turkey and Arab countries. Most aircraft were destroyed on 01.12.1994 by Russian airstrikes during First Chechen war.
Tajik Air	Various UADs of Tajik ACA	Active	
Tomskavia	Tomsk UAD of West Siberian ACA, Bogashovo	Defunct (2015)	
TyumenAviaTrans	Various UADs of Tyumen ACA	Active	Rebranded as UTair Aviation in 1999
Ural Airlines	1st Sverdlovsk UAD of Ural ACA, Koltsovo	Active	
Uzbekistan Airways	Various UADs of Uzbek ACA	Active	
Vladivostok Air	Vladivostok UAD of Far Eastern ACA, Knevichi	Defunct (2013)	Merged with SAT Airlines to form Aurora
Vnukovo Airlines	Vnukovo Production association of Civil Aviation, Vnukovo	Defunct (2001)	After bankruptcy acquired by Siberia Airlines
Vologda Aviation Enterprise	Vologda UAD of Leningrad (Northern) ACA, Vologda	Active	
Voronezhavia	Voronezh UAD of ACA of Central regions, Chertovitskoye	Defunct (2003)	

== See also ==
- Breakup of CAAC into government authority CAAC, Air China as flag carrier and international routes, and other 6 regional airlines, 1985-1990
