= USRN =

USRN may stand for:

- United Stations Radio Networks
- Unique Street Reference Number
- Nefteyugansk Airport, whose ICAO airport code is USRN
