= KMW =

KMW may refer to:

- Krauss-Maffei Wegmann, a German heavy equipment manufacturing company
- Klosterneuburger Mostwaage, a scale for must weight in winemaking primarily used in Austria, and originally the name of a piece of equipment for doing the actual measurement
- Karlstads Mekaniska Werkstad (Kamewa) (1860-1986), a former Swedish machinery company, now part of Rolls-Royce
- KMW, IATA code for Kostroma Airport in Russia
