= Belgorod Air Enterprise =

IATA	ICAO	Call sign
—	BED	Belogorye
- Founded: 1995
- Ceased operations: 2005
- Fleet size: See Fleet below
- Headquarters: Belgorod, Russia

OJSC "Belgorod Air Enterprise" (Russian: ОАО «Белгородское авиапредприятие») was a company based in Belgorod, Russia. It was founded in 1995 out of Central Districts Airlines and the Aeroflot Belgorod Division (as a so-called Babyflot). From 1995 to 2005, it operated domestic charter and scheduled passenger services in central Russia.

== History ==
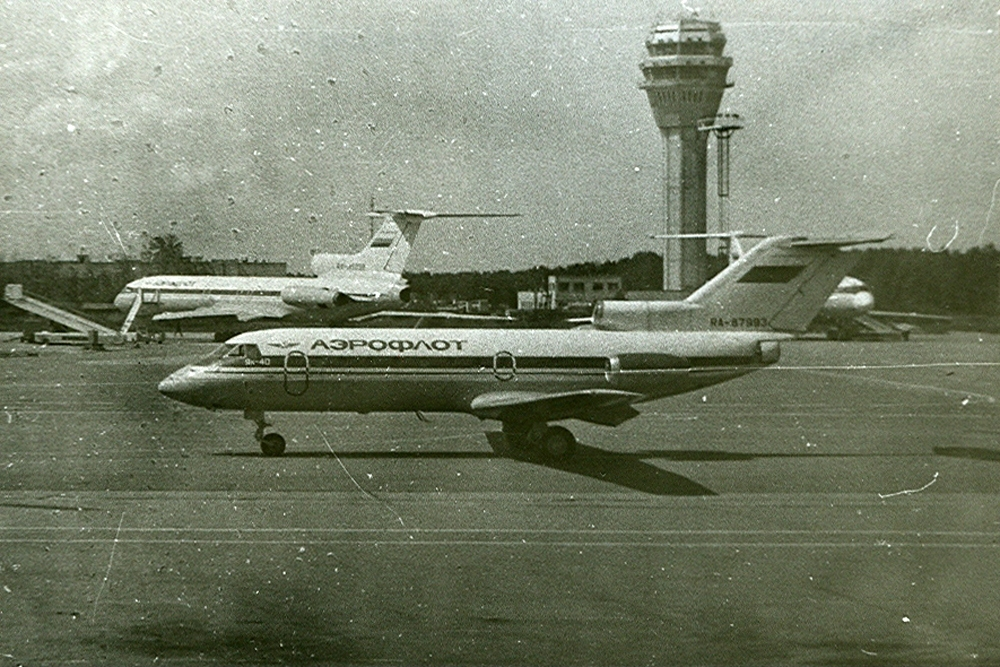
Yak-40 RA-87993 of Belgorod Air Squad in Pulkovo, 1993

In 1954, with establishment of Belgorod Oblast, the airfield near village of Yachnev Kolodez (nowadays Yachnevo district of Belgorod) was transformed into V-class airport Belgorod. Subsequently, an air unit of 1st air squadron, 170th united air squad from Kursk, consisting of 3 Polikarpov Po-2 aircraft, was dislocated to the new airport. In 1955 it was transformed into Belgorod air squadron of 170th air squad. In 1957, the squadron received airplanes of type Yakovlev Yak-12, and in 1959 - Antonov An-2. In 1968, it was transformed into Belgorod United Air Squad. It started using Kamov Ka-26 helicopters in 1976, Let L-410 turboprops in 1977 and Yakovlev Yak-40 trijets in 1981.

Upon the breakup of the Soviet Union and dissolution of Soviet Aeroflot, in 1994 Belgorod United Air Squad was reorganized into state-owned unitary company “Belgorod State Air Enterprise”, in 2002 into public joint-stock company “Belgorod Air Enterprise”. The flights were performed on Yak-40 aircraft.

In 2005, its own flying division was liquidated, but the company continued to operate Belgorod International Airport and provide ground services for aircraft that flew there. In 2010, the ownership was transferred from federal government of Russia to government of Belgorod oblast.

In March 2017 OJSC "Belgorod Air Enterprise" was declared bankrupt. In 2018, it was liquidated.

== Code data ==
- ICAO Code: BED
- Callsign: Belogorye

== Fleet ==
As of August 2006 the Belgorod Air Enterprise fleet included six Yakovlev Yak-40 aircraft.

Aircraft type	Introduced	Retired
Antonov An-2	1959	1996
Kamov Ka-26	1976	1986
Let L-410	1977	1989
Polikarpov Po-2	1954	no data
Yakovlev Yak-12	1957	no data
Yakovlev Yak-40	1981	2005
