= Stigl =

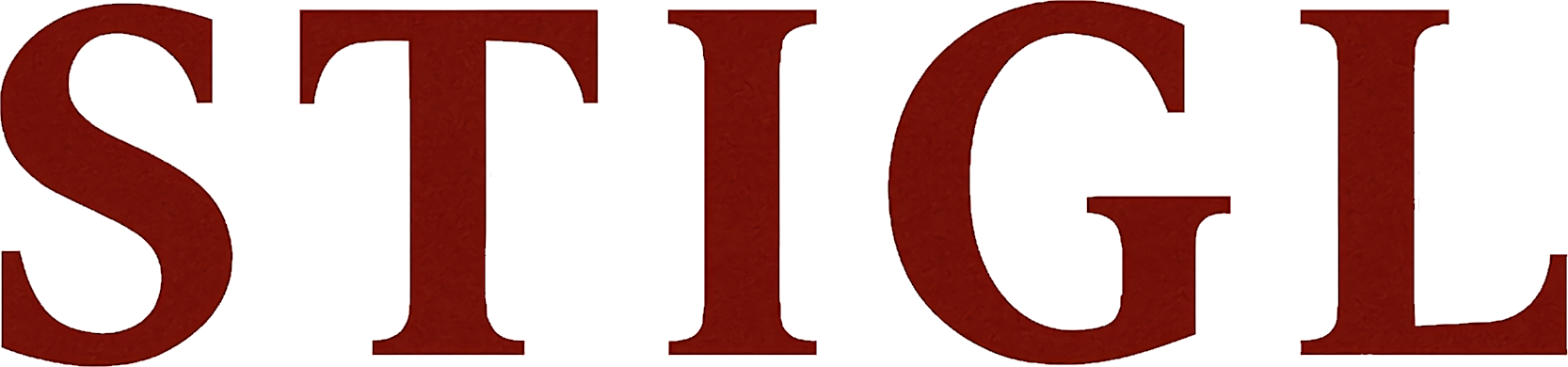

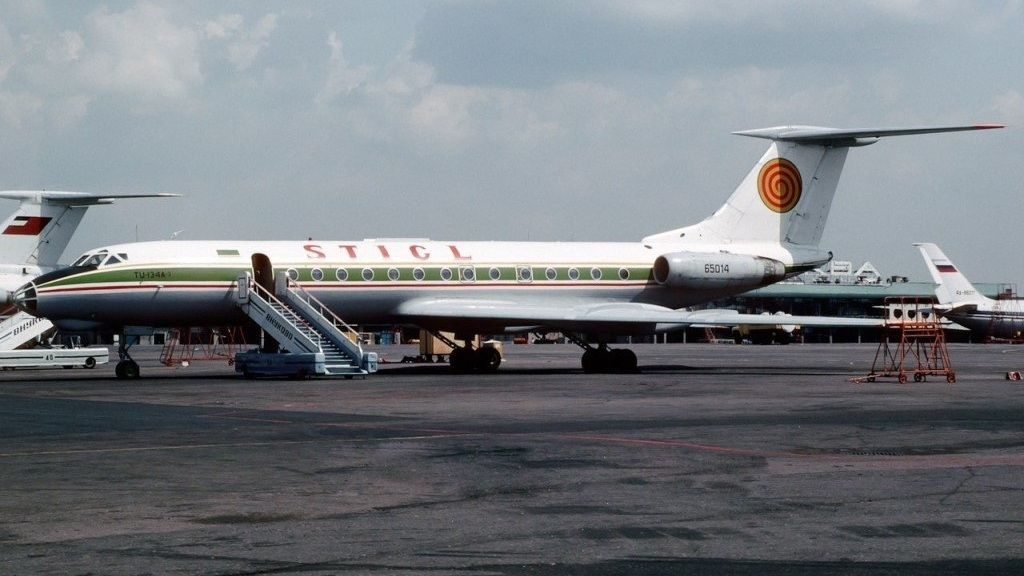
IATA	ICAO	Call sign
—	—	STIGL
- Founded: 1992
- Ceased operations: December 1, 1994
- Operating bases: Grozny Sheikh Mansur Airport
- Fleet size: 6
- Parent company: Government of Ichkeria
- Headquarters: Grozny

Stigl was an airline created in 1992 by separatist government of unrecognized Chechen Republic of Ichkeria using aircraft and assets of Grozny UAD of Soviet Aeroflot. The airline never obtained official registration from either Russian or international aviation authorities. The flights were performed from Grozny to airports of Turkey and some Arab countries. Most aircraft of Stigl were destroyed during Russian airstrikes on Chechen aerodromes on 1 December 1994, in the beginning of First Chechen War.

== History ==
Grozny division of Aeroflot was created in 1934. Throughout decades, it performed flights to destinations in Checheno-Ingush ASSR and other cities of Soviet Union. By the time of Soviet breakup, Grozny United Aviation Division, part of North Caucasian Administration of Civil Aviation, operated a few Tu-134 and An-2. In 1991, Soviet Air Forces major general and Chechen nationalist Dzhokhar Dudayev was elected president of Chechnya and shortly after that declared independence of Chechen Republic of Ichkeria from Russia, however, this was not recognized by any country. A period of civil unrest and armed struggle between Dudayev supporters and Chechen opposition backed by Russia continued until late 1994, when first Chechen War broke out as a result of Russian troops entering Chechnya in December 1994.

In 1992, Grozny UAD was renamed into air company Stigl (the name was coming from Chechen word stigal meaning "sky"). The airline was not registered with any Russian or international civil aviation authorities, and thus did not receive a valid air operator's certificate or any official codes. Flights were performed from Grozny airport, which was called Grozny-North during Soviet times and was renamed "Sheikh Mansur airport" by Ichkeria government.

Between 1992 and 1994, Stigl performed charter flights to Arabic countries and Turkey, contributing to shuttle trade. Lots of goods were imported into Chechnya and then sold in other regions of Russia without paying any Russian import tax, thus giving advantage to Chechen merchants and being one of income sources for Dudayev's government. According to Andrei Babitsky, these flights could also be used to deliver weapons for Dudayev's army.

One of the aircraft was used as a personal plane for Dudayev. In September 1992, Dudayev's aircraft was detained in Bosnia by French peacekeepers from United Nations Protection Force, possibly in relation to weapons smuggling, however, it was soon released.

On December 1, 1994, Russian air force conducted a massive attack Chechen aerodromes, including Grozny airport. As a result, most of Stigl aircraft were destroyed.

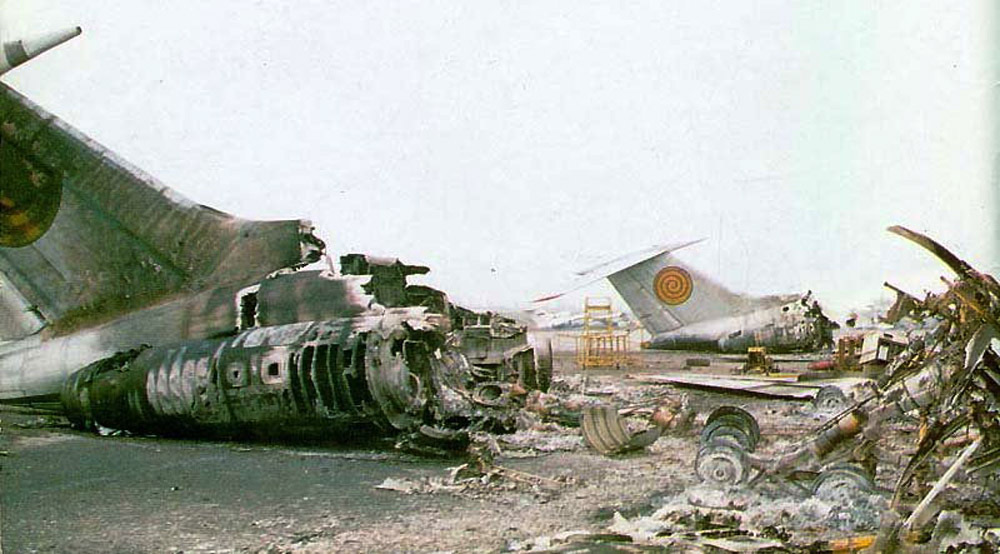
Wreckage of planes after the bombing by the Russian Air Force on Sheikh Mansur Airport.

== Fleet ==
Airline's fleet consisted of 6 Tu-134A airliners, inherited from Grozny United Aviation Division. At least 2 of them (65014 and 65075) were painted into Stigl's own livery, others remained in 1973 Soviet Aeroflot livery with markings replaced. Aircraft preserved Soviet registration numbers, although country prefix was removed. Most aircraft were destroyed by Russian airstrike on Grozny airport on 1 December 1994. The only aircraft that remained intact was 65039 (possibly due to not being in Chechnya on that day). The further usage history of it was unknown, but in 2002 it was abandoned in Khartoum airport in Sudan. As of 2017, it remains stored there, severely stripped of many parts.

Aircraft type	Quantity	Entered service	Service Ended	Tail numbers
Tupolev Tu-134A	2	1992	1994	65896, 65039
Tupolev Tu-134A-3	4	1992	1994	65858, 65014, 65030, 65075

== Destinations ==
Flights were performing charter flights into Turkey and Arabic countries. There are photos available on various spotting sites that depict Stigl airplanes in Munich in November 1994 and Vnukovo in July 1994.

== See also ==
- Babyflot
- Chechen–Russian conflict
- Chechen Republic of Ichkeria
