= Kadyrov Grozny International Airport =

Airport serving Grozny, Chechen Republic, Russia

Grozny Airport Соьлжа-ГӀалан Дуьненаюкъара Аэропорт Междунаро́дный Аэропорт «Грозный»
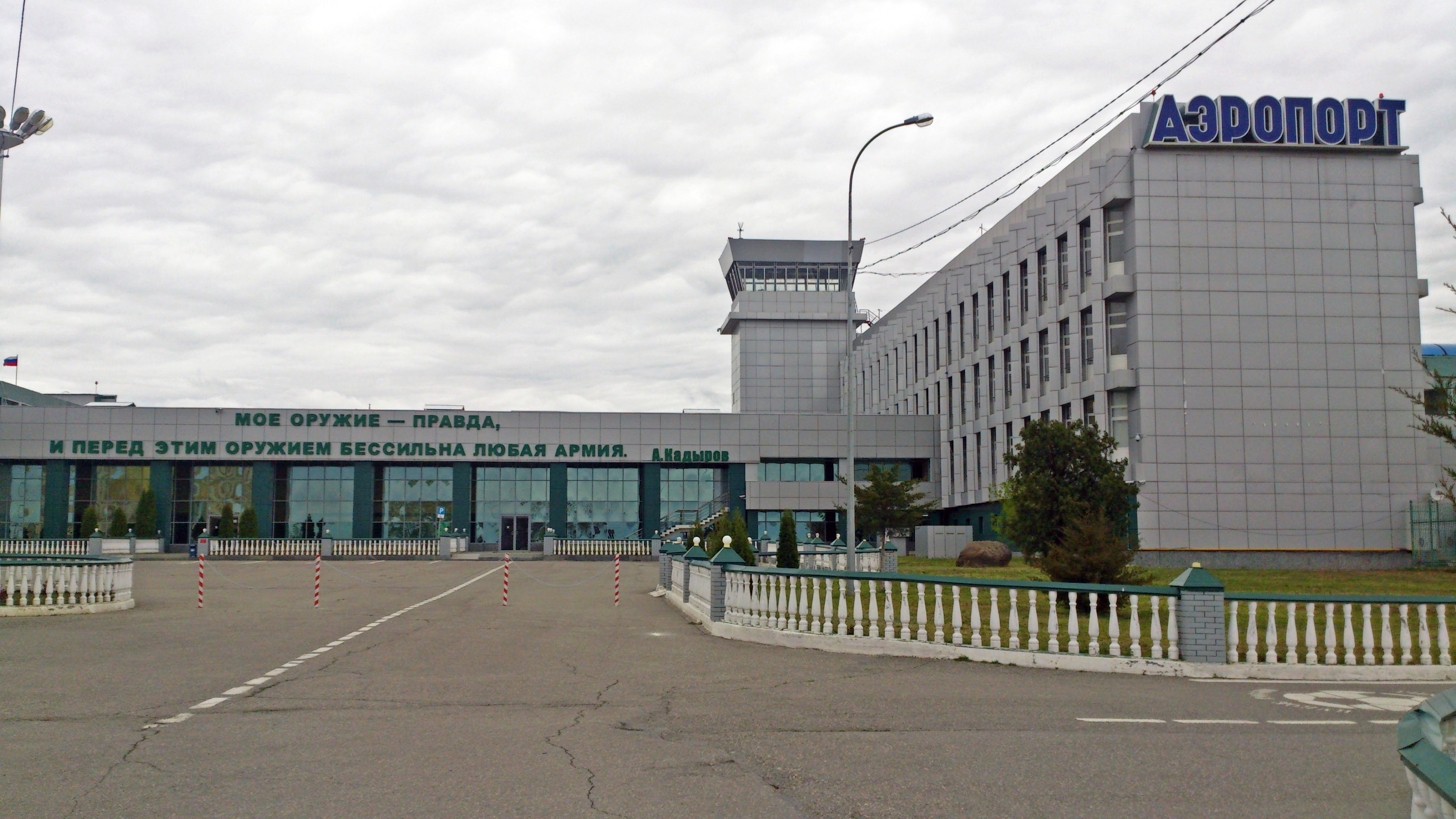
- IATA: GRV; ICAO: URMG

Summary
- Airport type: Public
- Owner: Government of the Chechen Republic
- Operator: Vainakhavia JSC
- Serves: Grozny
- Elevation AMSL: 167 m (548 ft)
- Coordinates: 43°23′17.52″N 45°41′58.86″E
- Website: airport-grozny.ru

Map
- Location of airport in Chechnya

Runways
Direction	Length		Surface
Direction	m	ft	Surface
08/26	2,500	8,202	Concrete

Akhmat Kadyrov Grozny International Airport (IATA: GRV, ICAO: URMG) (Chechen: Соьлжа-ГӀалин Дуьненаюкъара Аэропорт; Russian: Междунаро́дный Аэропорт «Грозный»), also known as Severny International Airport, is an international airport in Chechnya, Russia, located 7.5 km north of Grozny, the capital of the Chechen Republic.

== History ==
First Grozny Airport began its work in 1938, when the aircraft P-5 and U-2 started to be the first postal transportation and sanitary flights. After a while, it started to fly for agriculture. Until 1977, Grozny airport had only a dirt runway, which could accommodate only such aircraft as the Li-2, IL-14, An-24, and An-10.

In 1977, the new airport complex was introduced with an artificial runway and basing speed passenger aircraft Tu-134, which was stationed in the Chechen Republic with the regions of the USSR. The new airport was named "Airport North."

Between the years 1990 and 2000, the airport name was changed several times:

- 1990 - Sheikh Mansour Airport
- 1995 - Airport "North"
- 1996 - Sheikh Mansour Airport
- 2000 - Airport "North"

The infrastructure of Grozny airport was significantly damaged during combat operations against Chechen fighters, who seized the airport on September 8, 1991, and held it until 30 September 1994. After the end of the war and the beginning of a relatively peaceful life in the country, the airport gradually recovered. In 2000, the FSI "Directorate for Recovery of Grozny Airport" North "under the leadership of Adnan Gakayeva Vakhidovich, in respect of which on 1 December 2005, the investigation department of the FSB for the Chechen Republic was prosecuted for embezzlement of funds, in particular, large-scale, aimed at restoring the airport.

During 1999–2006, in the process of rebuilding the airport, the runway was expanded and extended. The airport complex capable of receiving the Tu-154 and IL-62 was rebuilt. The 6 March 2002 Russian Ministry of Transport Decree number AT-76-P launched a full-scale rebuilding of the airport. In 2005, North Airport was renamed Grozny Airport.

On 19 February 2007, the order of FATA number AIO-19 issued a certificate of state registration to the Grozny Airport (North). The airport was assigned to class B to gain admission to the reception of Tu-134 aircraft and helicopters of all types, day and night, all year round. On November 29, 2007, Grozny airport was authorized to receive the Tu-154.

The first regular passenger flight to Grozny, which had been suspended for six years, resumed on March 8, 2007. The inaugural flight landed at Chechnya's main airport and marked the restart of civilian air service between the city and Moscow.

On 11 June 2009, the Interstate Aviation Committee (IAC) issued an international aerodrome certificate, the aerodrome was accepted as suitable for international flight service.

On June 13, 2023, Russian President Vladimir Putin signed a decree on the transfer of ownership from the Federal Government of Russia to the Government of the Chechen Republic.

== Expansion project ==
In June 2020, the Russian Government announced a 4.7 billion ruble expansion and modernization plan, including a new terminal, a second runway, an emergency rescue station, and other major facilities to boost the airport's capacity to 2.5 million passengers annually. The new terminal will have a striking crescent shape and will cover around 40000 square meters. The new runway will be 3200 meters long and can accommodate large-sized aircraft like the Boeing 747 or Airbus A380. The completion of the project is expected to be around 2026-2027. As of February 2026, about 63% of the construction has been completed.

In November 2025, a new air control tower was completed for 2.2 billion rubles as part of the reconstruction project.

== Airlines and destinations ==
Airlines	Destinations
Aeroflot	Moscow–Sheremetyevo
Centrum Air	Tashkent
FlyOne	Medina, Tashkent
Jazeera Airways	Seasonal charter: Medina
Red Wings Airlines	Yekaterinburg
Rossiya Airlines	Saint Petersburg
Tailwind Airlines	Seasonal charter: Antalya
Ural Airlines	Moscow–Domodedovo
Utair	Dubai-Al Maktoum, Istanbul, Moscow–Vnukovo, Surgut
UVT Aero	Kazan
Uzbekistan Airlines	Tashkent

=== Historical airlines ===
- Stigl – the former national airline of the Chechen Republic of Ichkeria, operated from Grozny Sheikh Mansur Airport between 1992 and 1994.

== Accidents and incidents ==
On 14 October 2024, a Mahan Air Avro RJ-100 mistakenly landed on a 1600-meter section of the runway under construction after misidentifying during approach. No injuries or damages have been reported.

On 25 December 2024, Azerbaijan Airlines Flight 8243 was suspected to have been struck by anti-aircraft weapons amid a suspected Ukrainian drone attack on approach to Grozny Airport, leading it to crash in Kazakhstan, killing 38 of the 67 people on board.

== See also ==
- List of airports in Russia
- List of the busiest airports in the former Soviet Union
