= Nefteyugansk United Airline Transportation Company =

Russian airline

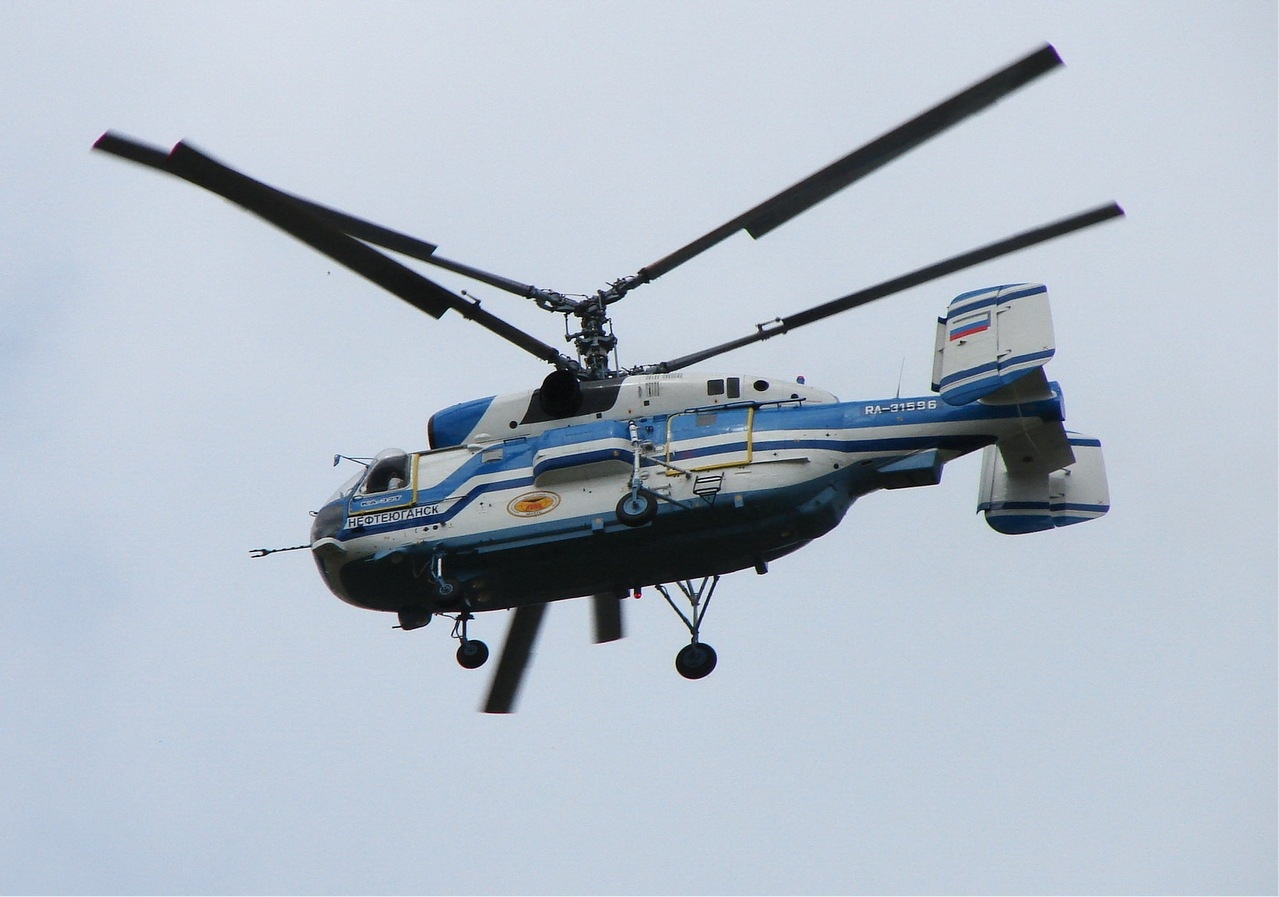
- Nefteyugansk United Airline Transportation Company Kamov Ka-32
- Native name: Нефтеюганская объединенная авиатранспортная компания
- Formerly: Nefteyugansk United Aviation Squadron
- Company type: JTC
- Industry: Charter flights
- Founded: 1975
- Fate: Renamed
- Successor: UTair Helicopter Services
- Headquarters: Nefteyugansk Airport, Khanty-Mansi Autonomous Okrug, Russia

Nefteyugansk United Airline Transportation Company
IATA	ICAO	Call sign
—	NFT	Nefteavia
- Fleet size: 25

Nefteyugansk United Airline Transportation Company is an airline based in Nefteyugansk, Khanty–Mansi Autonomous Okrug, Russia. Its main base is Nefteyugansk Airport.

== Code data ==
- ICAO Code: NFT
- Callsign: Nefteavia

== History ==
The airline was established and started operations in 1975. It was formerly named Nefteyugansk United Aviation Squadron.

== Fleet ==
The Nefteyugansk Air Enterprise fleet includes the following aircraft (at March 2007):

- 5 Kamov Ka-32T
- 12 Mil Mi-8T
- 8 Mil Mi-17
