= Uktus Airport =

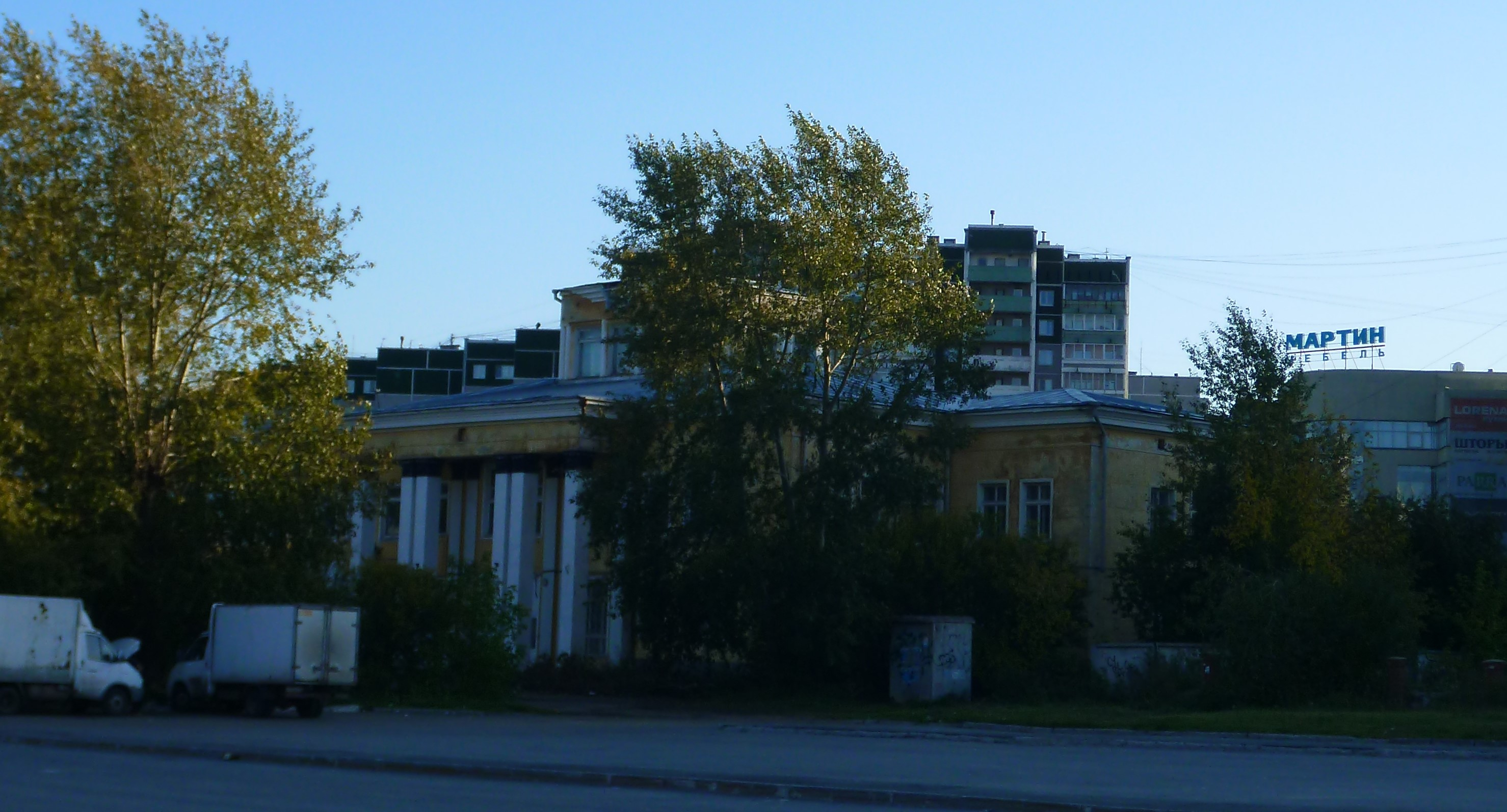
- IATA: none; ICAO: USSK

Summary
- Airport type: Public
- Operator: JSC 2nd Sverdlovsk Air Enterprise
- Location: Yekaterinburg
- Elevation AMSL: 643 ft (196 m)
- Coordinates: 56°42′6″N 60°47′24″E
- Interactive map of Uktus Airport

Runways
Direction	Length		Surface
Direction	ft	m	Surface
08/26	5,906	1,800	Asphalt

Uktus Airport (Russian: Аэропорт Уктус) (ICAO: USSK) is an airport in Russia located 20 km southeast of Yekaterinburg, on the site of the former Aramil military base. It is a small airfield 5 km south of the larger Koltsovo Airport. Google Earth images shows dozens of general aviation prop planes and five helicopters.

== History ==
The construction of the airport building was completed in 1937.

The building was declared an emergency, it was demolished on November 26, 2021.

== Airlines and destinations ==
Airlines	Destinations
Gazpromavia	Moscow–Vnukovo

== See also ==
- List of airports in Russia
