= Kostroma Air Enterprise =

Kostroma Air Enterprise Костромское Авиапредприятие
IATA	ICAO	Call sign
KB	KMW	—
- Founded: 1944
- Hubs: Kostroma Airport
- Destinations: 3
- Headquarters: Kostroma, Russia
- Website: www.kostroma-avia.ru

Kostroma Air Enterprise is the regional airline, operating regular flights in Central Russia, as well as Charter flights. Airline is based in Kostroma Airport. Kostroma Air Enterprise is 100% owned by the government of Kostroma Oblast. It is currently banned from flying in the EU.

== Fleet ==
As February 2022 Kostroma Air Enterprise operates following fleet:

Kostroma Air Enterprise fleet
Aircraft	In service	Orders	Passengers	Notes
Antonov An-2P	1	—	12	Stored at Kostroma Airport
Antonov An-26-100	1	—	43	
Antonov An-26B	1	—		Stored at Kostroma Airport
Antonov An-26B-100	2	—		
Mil Mi-2	1	—	8	

== Destinations ==
As of January 2025 Kostroma Air Enterprise operates regular flights to the following destinations:

Kostroma Oblast

- Kostroma - Kostroma Airport Base

Nizhny Novgorod Oblast

- Nizhny Novgorod - Strigino Airport Begins 1 March 2025

Saint Petersburg / Leningrad Oblast

- Saint Petersburg - Pulkovo Airport

Tatarstan

- Kazan - Ğabdulla Tuqay Kazan International Airport Seasonal

== Photos ==
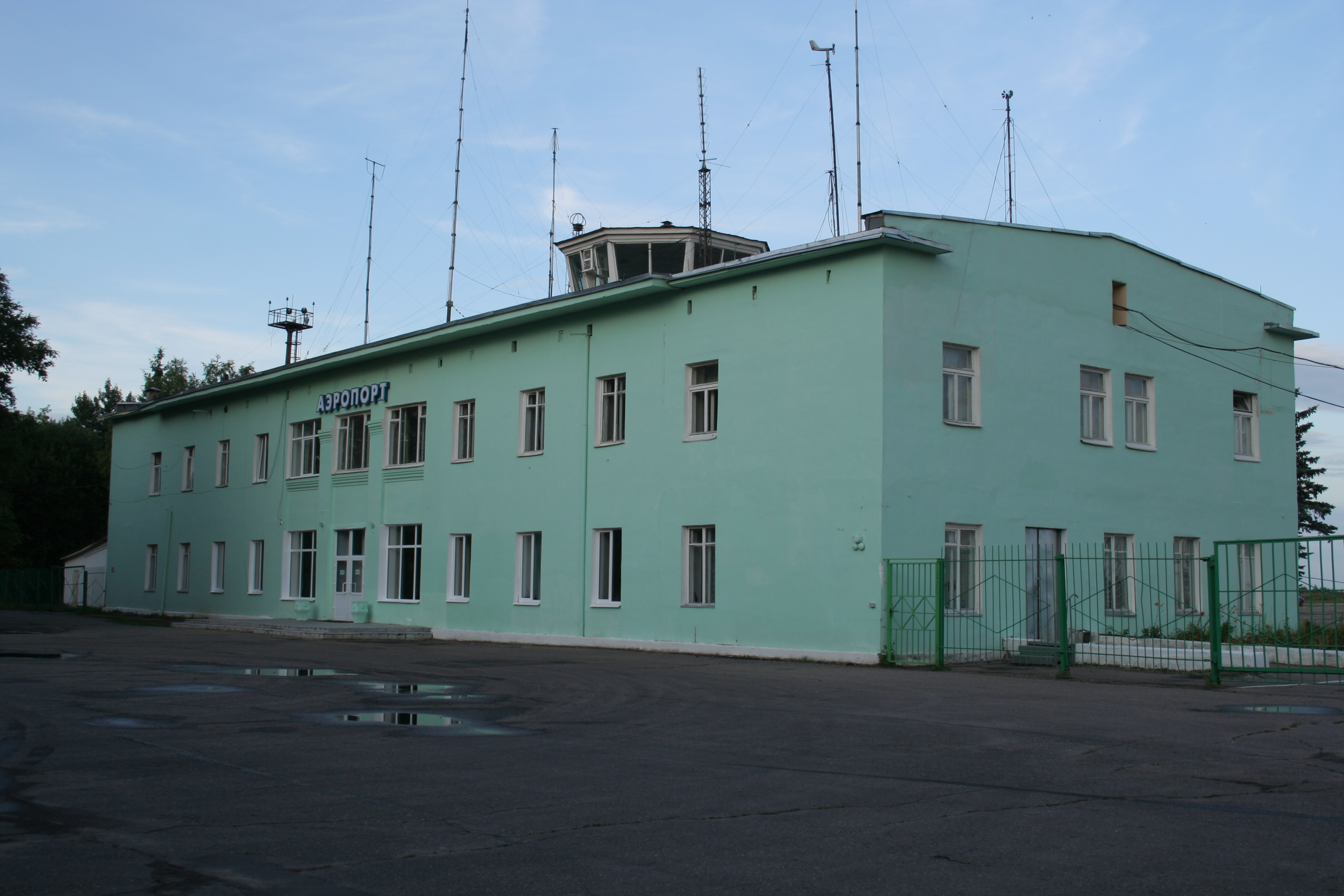
Kostroma Airport

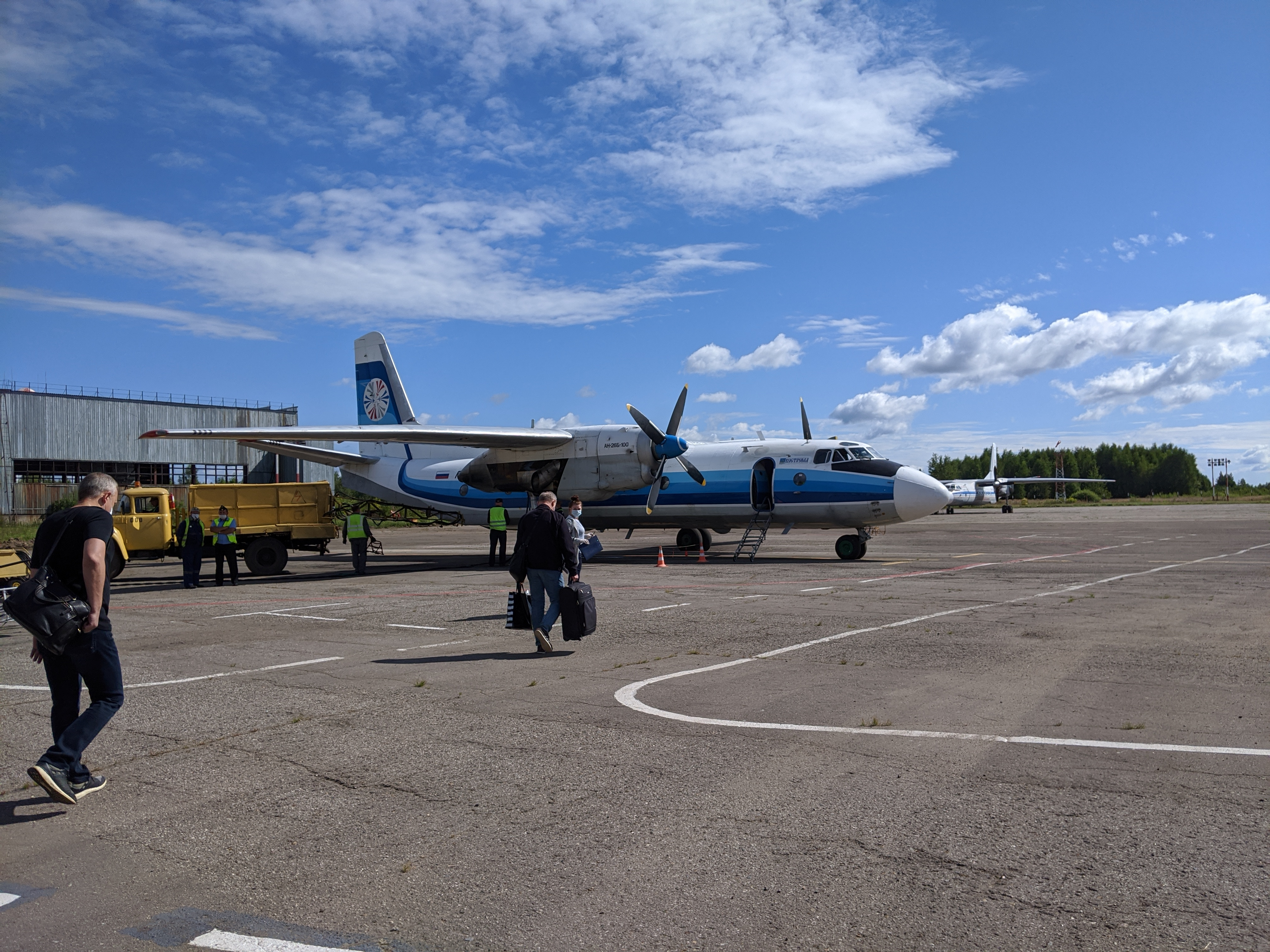
An-26B

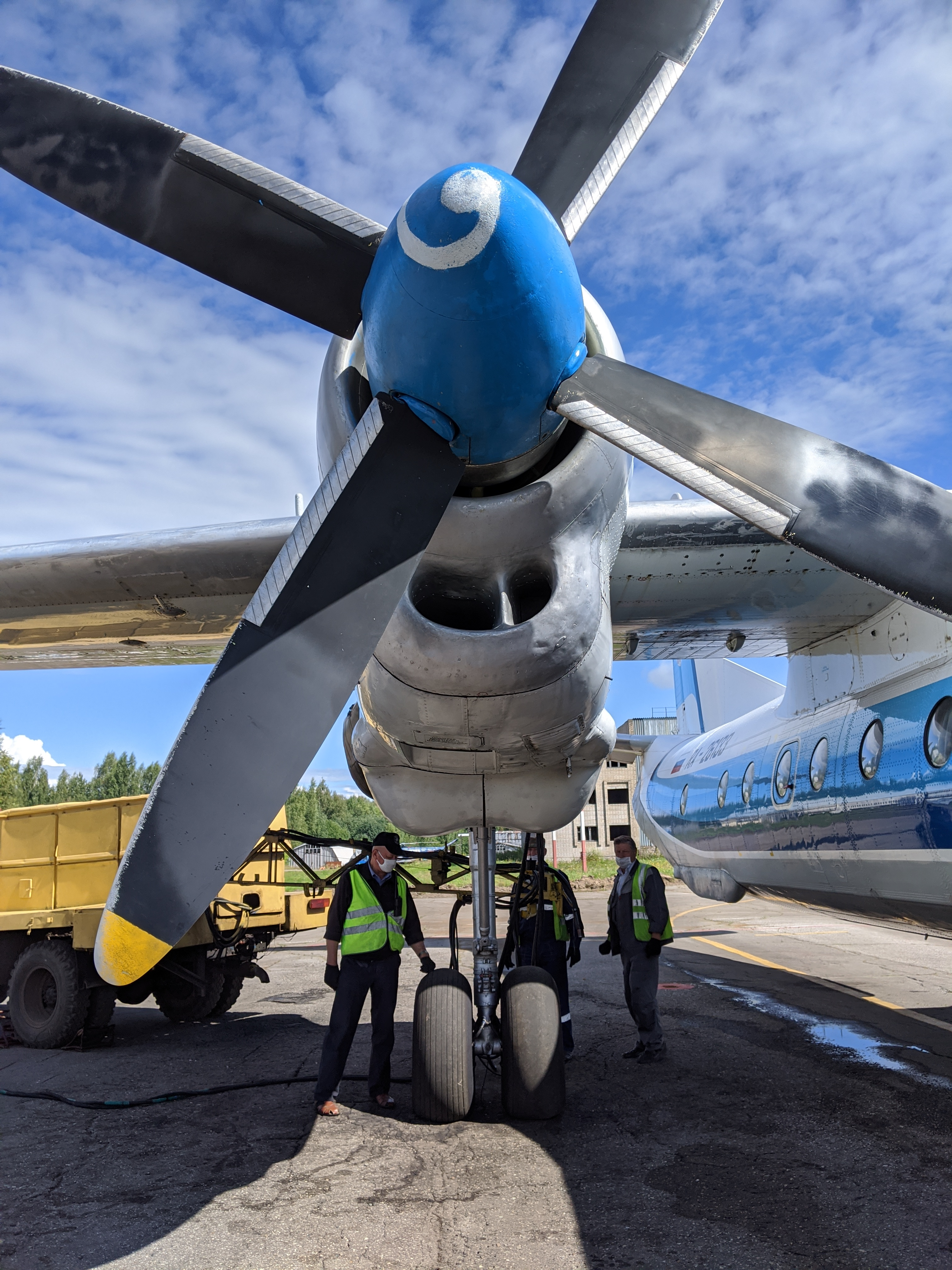
An-26B engines

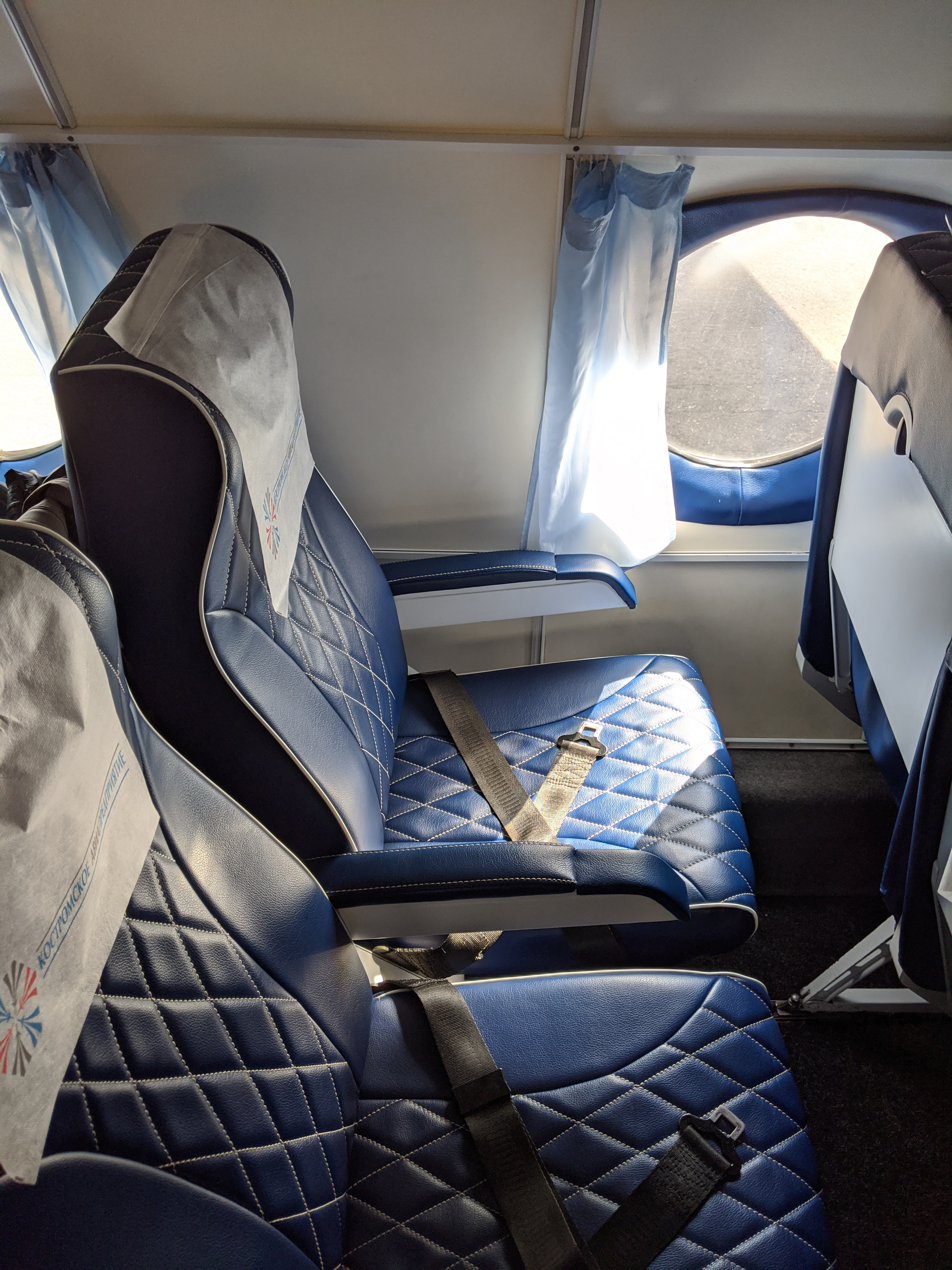
An-26B interior

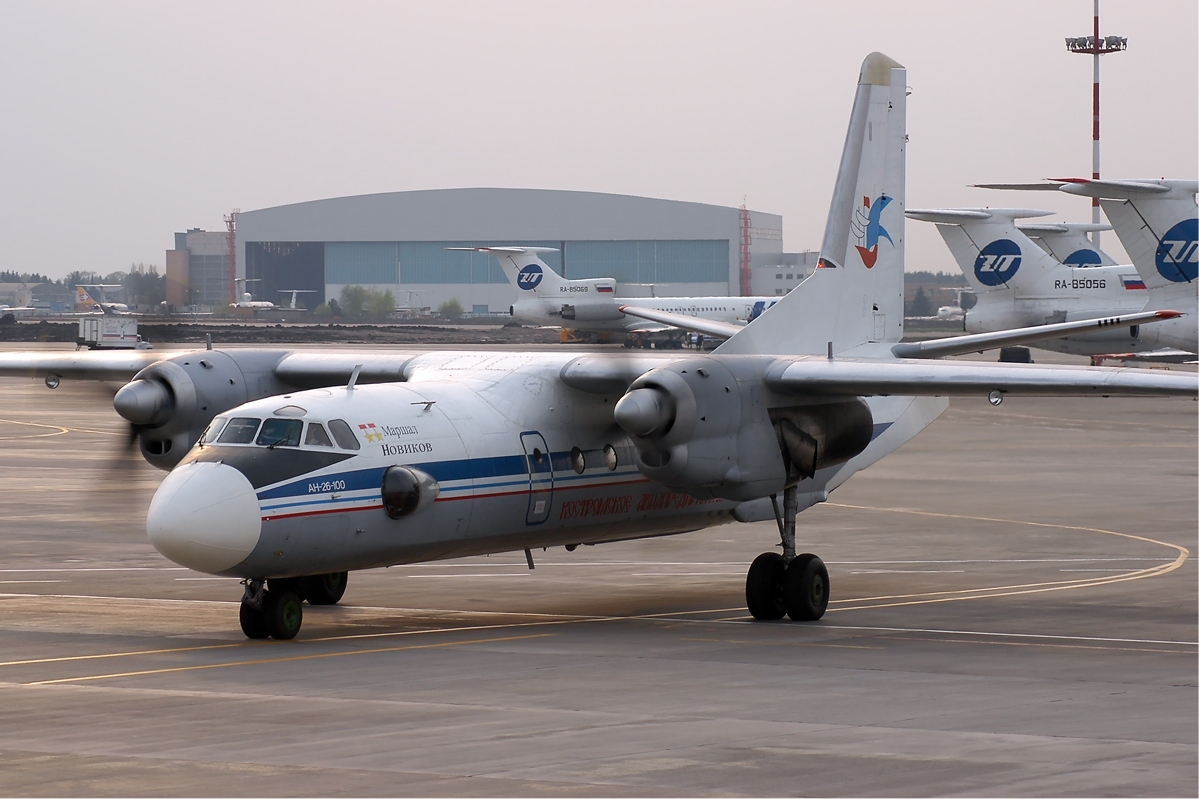
In Moscow, Vnukovo Airport

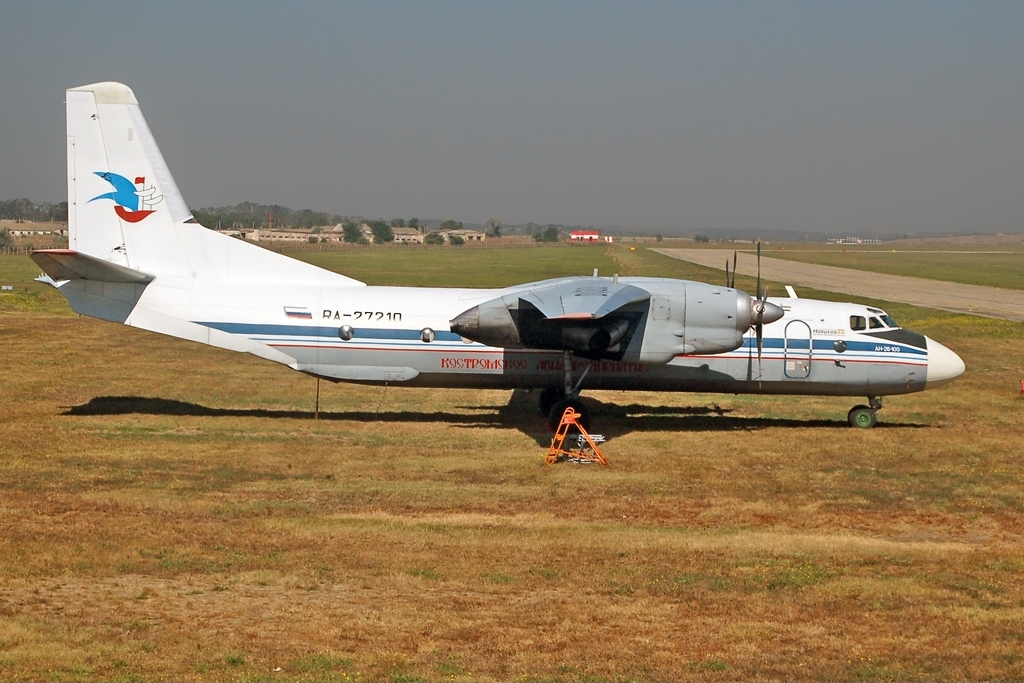
In Anapa, Vityazevo Airport

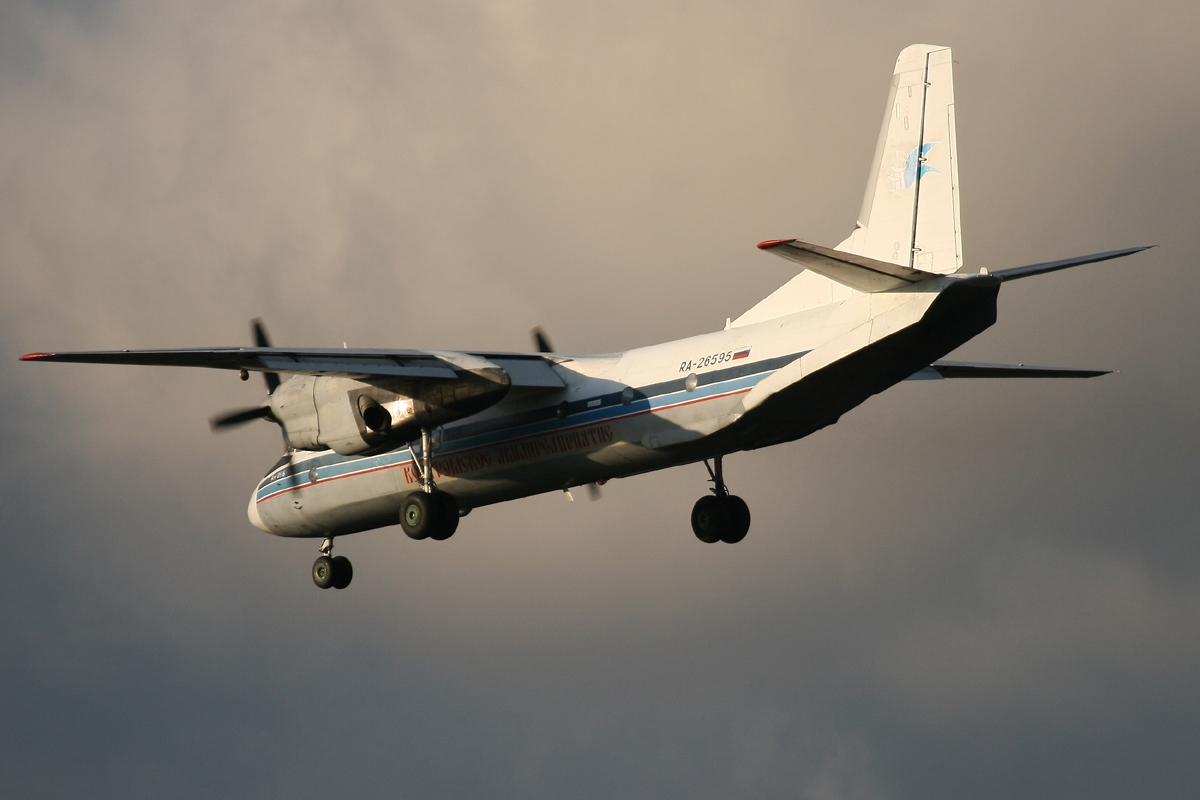
Lading in Moscow, Sheremetyevo Airport

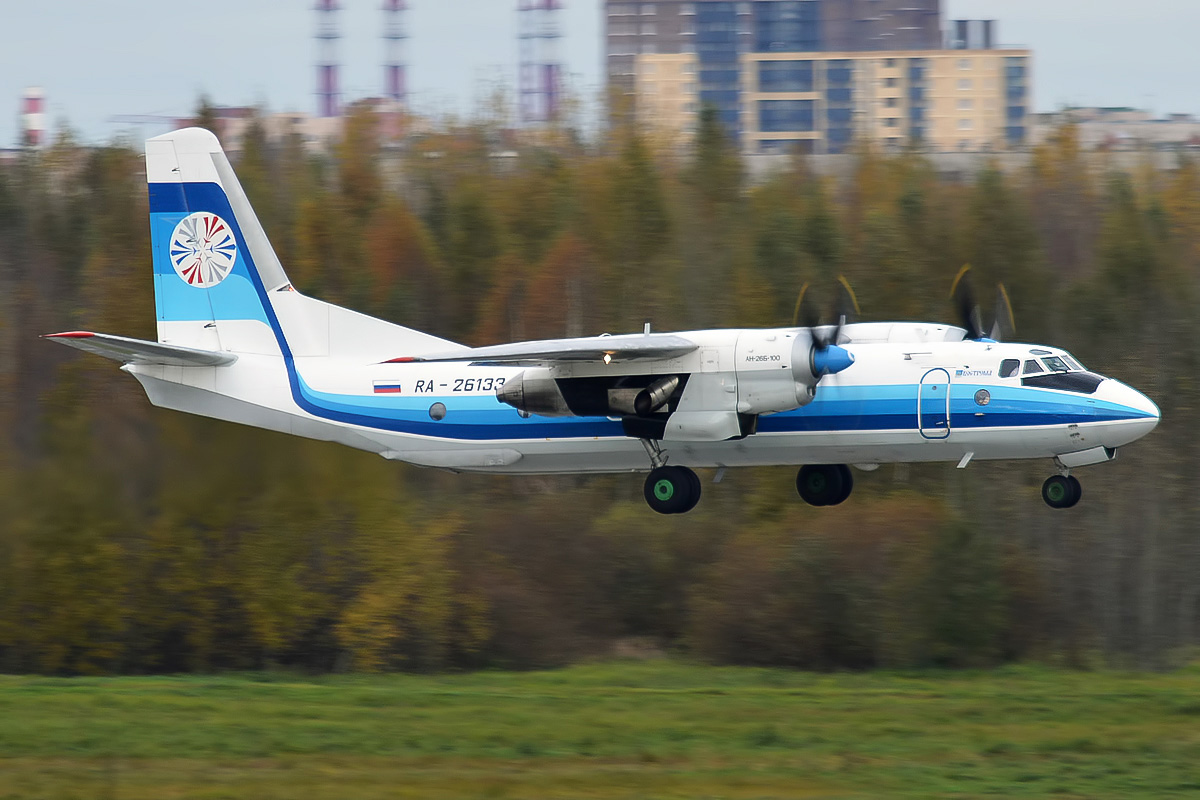
Landing in St Petersburg, Pulkovo Airport
