= Kazan Air Enterprise =

Russian airline

| IATA | ICAO | Call sign |
|---|---|---|
| — | KKA | — |
- Founded: January 1, 1994
- Hubs: Kazan International Airport, Kurkachi Airport
- Fleet size: 6 (in 2011)
- Headquarters: Kazan, Russia

Kazan Air Enterprise is an airline based in Kazan, Tatarstan, Russia. It operates air taxi services and aerial work. Its main base is Kazan International Airport. It is currently banned from flying into the EU.

== History ==
The airline was formerly known as Kazan 2nd Aviation Enterprise.

== Fleet ==
As of March 2011 the Kazan Air Enterprise fleet includes:

| Aircraft | In service |
|---|---|
| Bell 407 | 1 |
| Robinson 44 | 1 |
| Mil Mi-8 | 2 |
| Let L-410 UVP-E | 2 |
