= Ural Airlines =

Airline of Russia

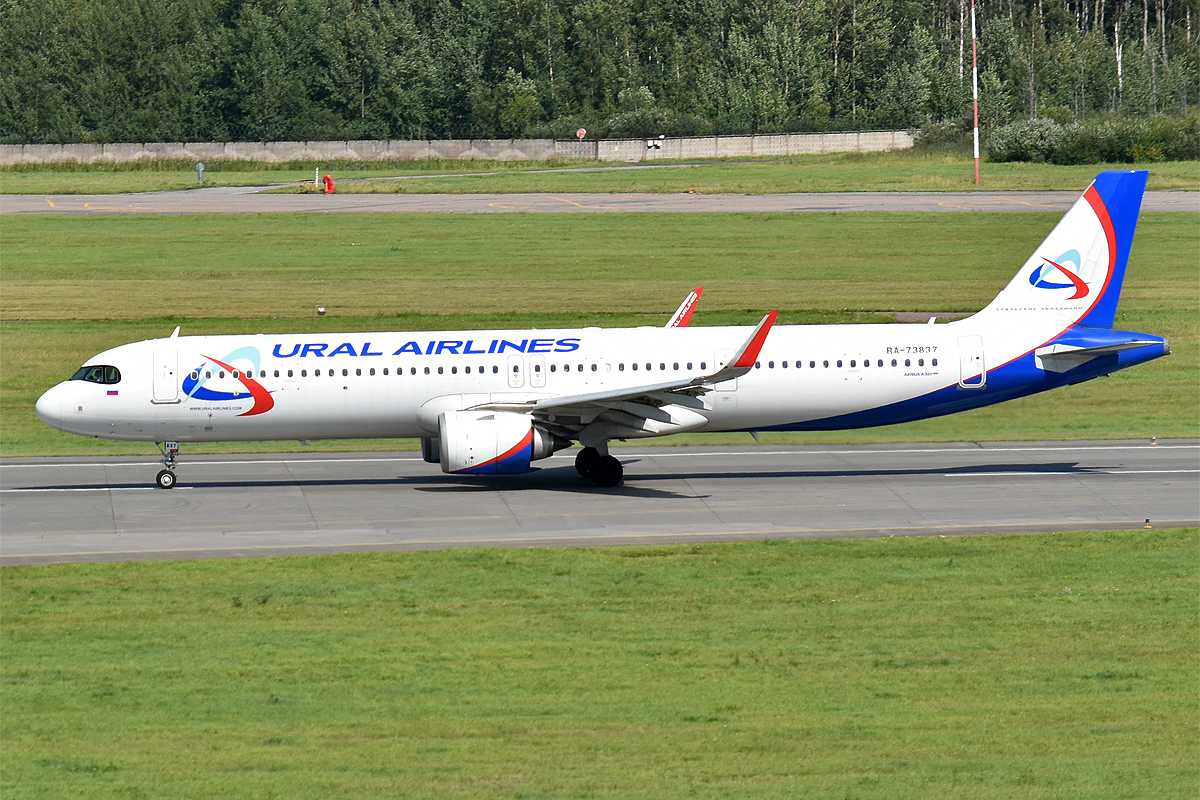
- Ural Airlines Airbus A321neo
IATA	ICAO	Call sign
U6	SVR	SVERDLOVSK AIR
- Founded: 1943; 83 years ago (as part of Aeroflot)
- Commenced operations: 1993
- Hubs: Moscow–Domodedovo; Yekaterinburg-Koltsovo
- Secondary hubs: Moscow–Zhukovsky; Saint Petersburg
- Focus cities: Chelyabinsk; Irkutsk; Krasnodar; Mineralnye Vody; Samara; Novosibirsk-Tolmachevo; Ufa
- Frequent-flyer program: Wings
- Fleet size: 51
- Destinations: 52
- Headquarters: Yekaterinburg, Sverdlovsk Oblast, Russia
- Key people: Kirill Skuratov (General Director)
- Website: uralairlines.ru

Ural Airlines (Russian: Ура́льские авиали́нии, Ural’skiye avialinii) is an airline based in Yekaterinburg, Sverdlovsk Oblast, Russia, that operates scheduled and chartered domestic and international flights out of Koltsovo International Airport. In 2018, the company transported nine million passengers.

== Overview ==
The airline was founded in 1943 as Sverdlovsk State Air Enterprises, and later became part of Aeroflot, the Soviet state airline, being in charge of Yekaterinburg Airport. Following the split-up of Aeroflot, Ural Airlines became a joint stock company incorporated under the laws of the Russian Federation on 28 December 1993, and the airline business was separated from the airport.

In 2010, Ural Airlines retired all of its Antonov An-24s, Ilyushin Il-86s and Tupolev Tu-154B-2s. The airline's Tupolev Tu-154M, in 164-seat two-class configuration, was retired on October 16, 2011.

Ural Airlines has 3348 employees.

As of 2012, the airline also planned to buy a training complex for the Airbus A330-300.

In 2017, Skytrax gave Ural Airlines three stars, which made it the fourth airline with three stars in Russia and CIS after S7 Airlines, Uzbekistan Airlines and Air Moldova.

Currently, the main hubs of Ural Airlines are Moscow-Domodedovo and Yekaterinburg. Ural Airlines has plans to increase its number of hubs, by developing hubs at Moscow-Sheremetyevo and Moscow-Zhukovsky.

In 2020, flights commenced to Russian-controlled Crimea.

In 2022, Ural Airlines was added to the European Union's sanctions list for transporting military personnel during the Russian invasion of Ukraine.

== Corporate affairs ==
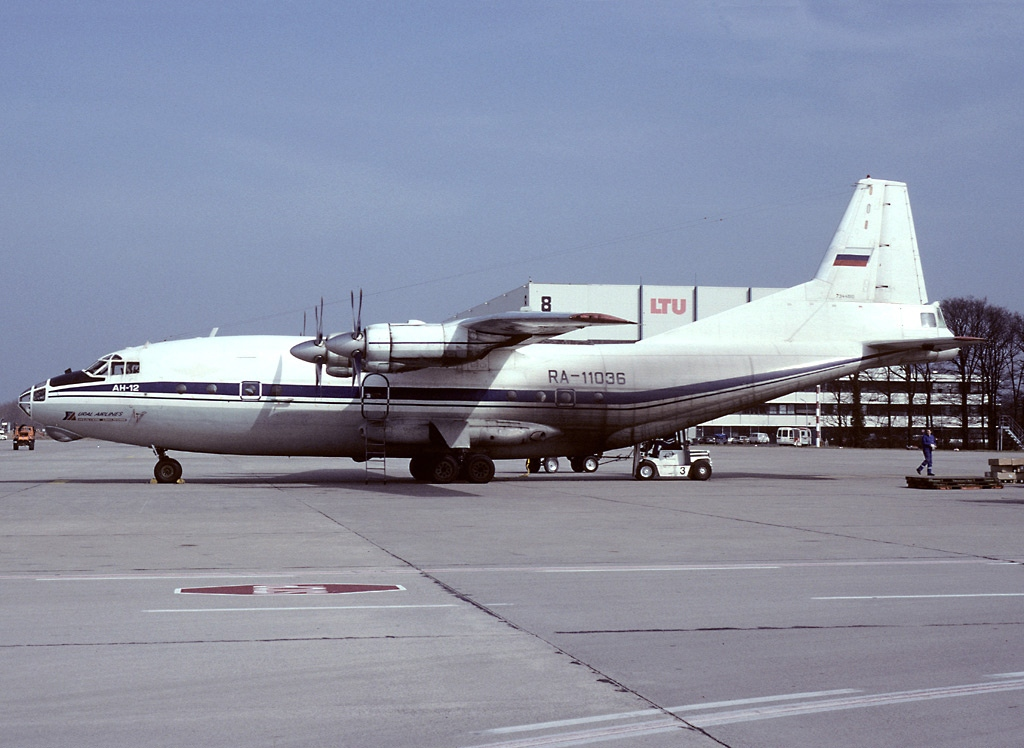
A former Ural Airlines Antonov An-12, the airline's first aircraft type after their independence from Aeroflot

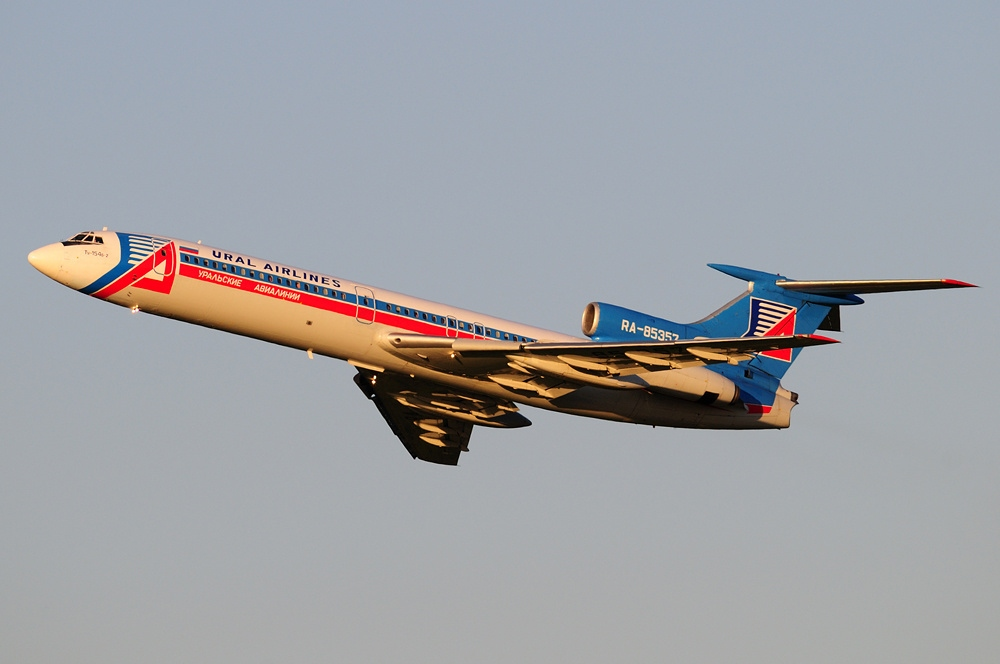
A former Ural Airlines Tupolev Tu-154B-2

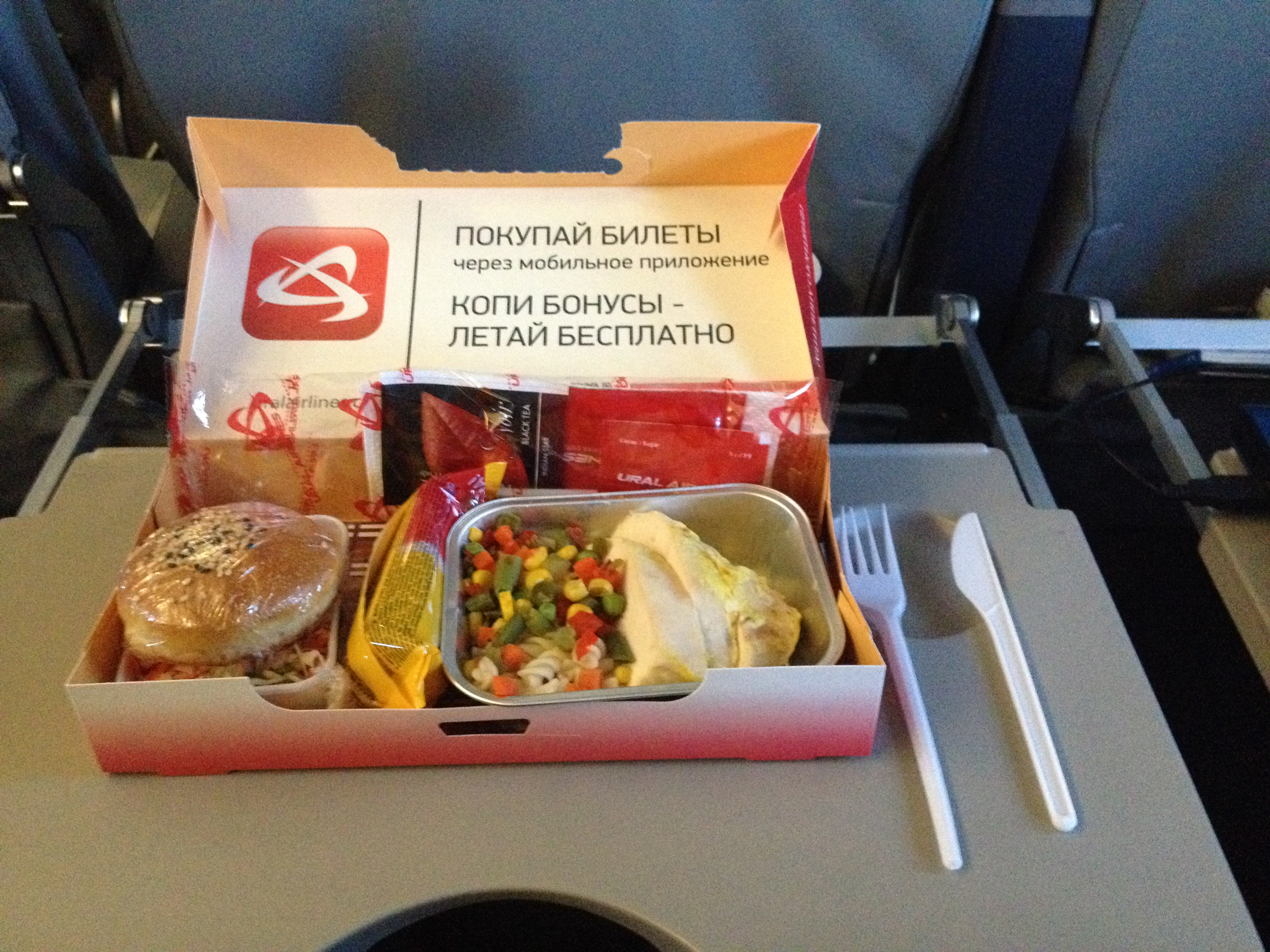
A meal aboard Ural Airlines

A million passengers per year was first achieved in 2006. Since then, the airline and its passenger numbers have both grown. In 2013, the airline transported 4.419 million passengers, the sixth most in Russia that year.

Passengers transported
Year	Amount
2018	9.001 million (+13%)
2017	8.000 million (+24%)
2016	6.467 million (+19%)
2015	5.445 million (+6%)
2014	5.161 million (+17%)
2013	4.419 million (+25%)
2012	3.525 million (+40%)
2011	2.513 million (+40%)
2010	1.792 million (+12%)
2009	1.497 million (+3%)
2008	1.450 million (+19%)
2007	1.217 million (+20%)
2006	1.011 million (+11%)
2005	0.909 million

Financial performance
Year	Revenue	Net profit
2024	₽143,4 billion (+29.2%)	
2023	₽110,9 billion (+24.2%)	₽17,1 billion (+26.9%)
2022	₽89,3 billion	₽13,4 billion
2015	₽43,843 million (+19%)	₽285 million (-49%)
2014	₽36,666 million (+25%)	₽559 million (+171%)
2013	₽29,199 million (+26%)	₽206 million (+42%)
2012	₽23,102 million (+33%)	₽145 million (+1%)
2011	₽17,329 million (+32%)	₽143 million (+376%)
2010	₽13,061 million (+23%)	₽30 million (+101%)
2009	₽10,573 million (-8%)	₽-758 million (-346%)
2008	₽11,528 million (+59%)	₽307 million (+103%)
2007	₽7,240 million (+16%)	₽-138 million (-611%)
2006	₽6,241 million	₽27 million

== Destinations ==
As of November 2023, the airline serves 11 countries on 138 routes.

=== Codeshare agreements ===
Ural Airlines has codeshare agreements with the following airlines:

- Red Wings Airlines
- Uzbekistan Airways

== Fleet ==
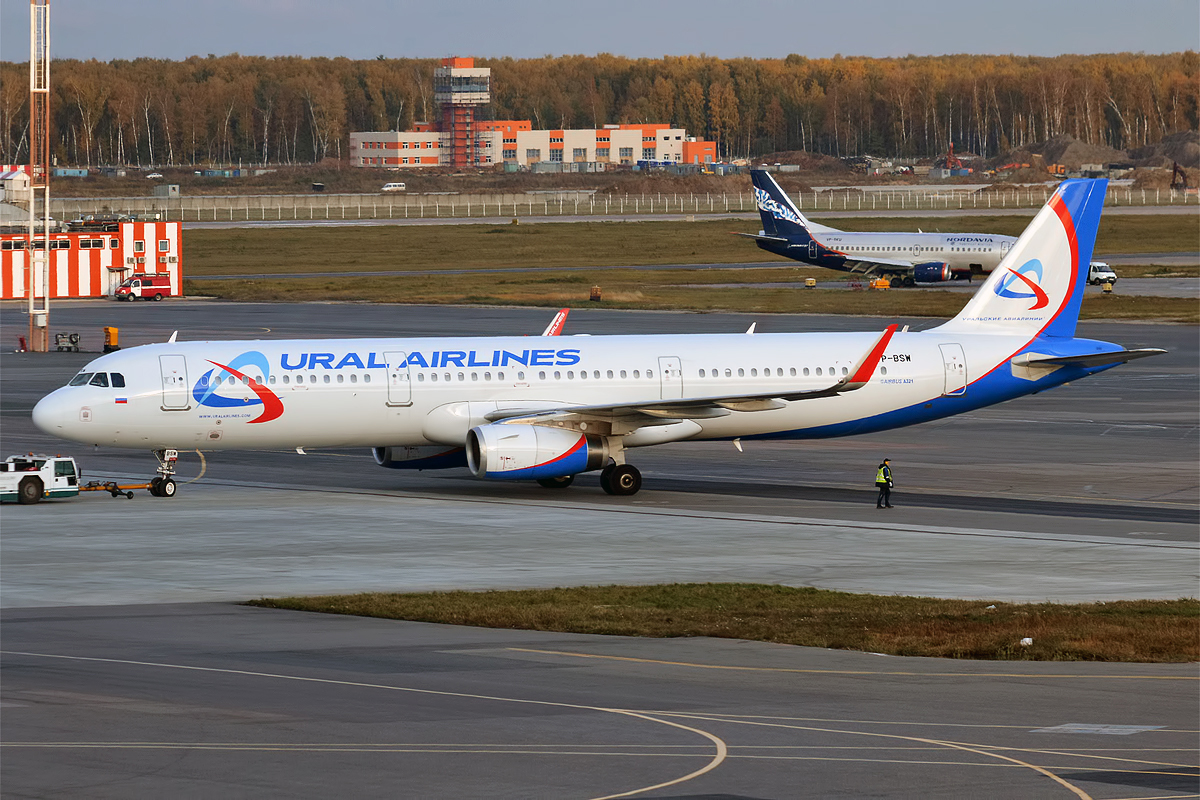
Ural Airlines Airbus A321-200

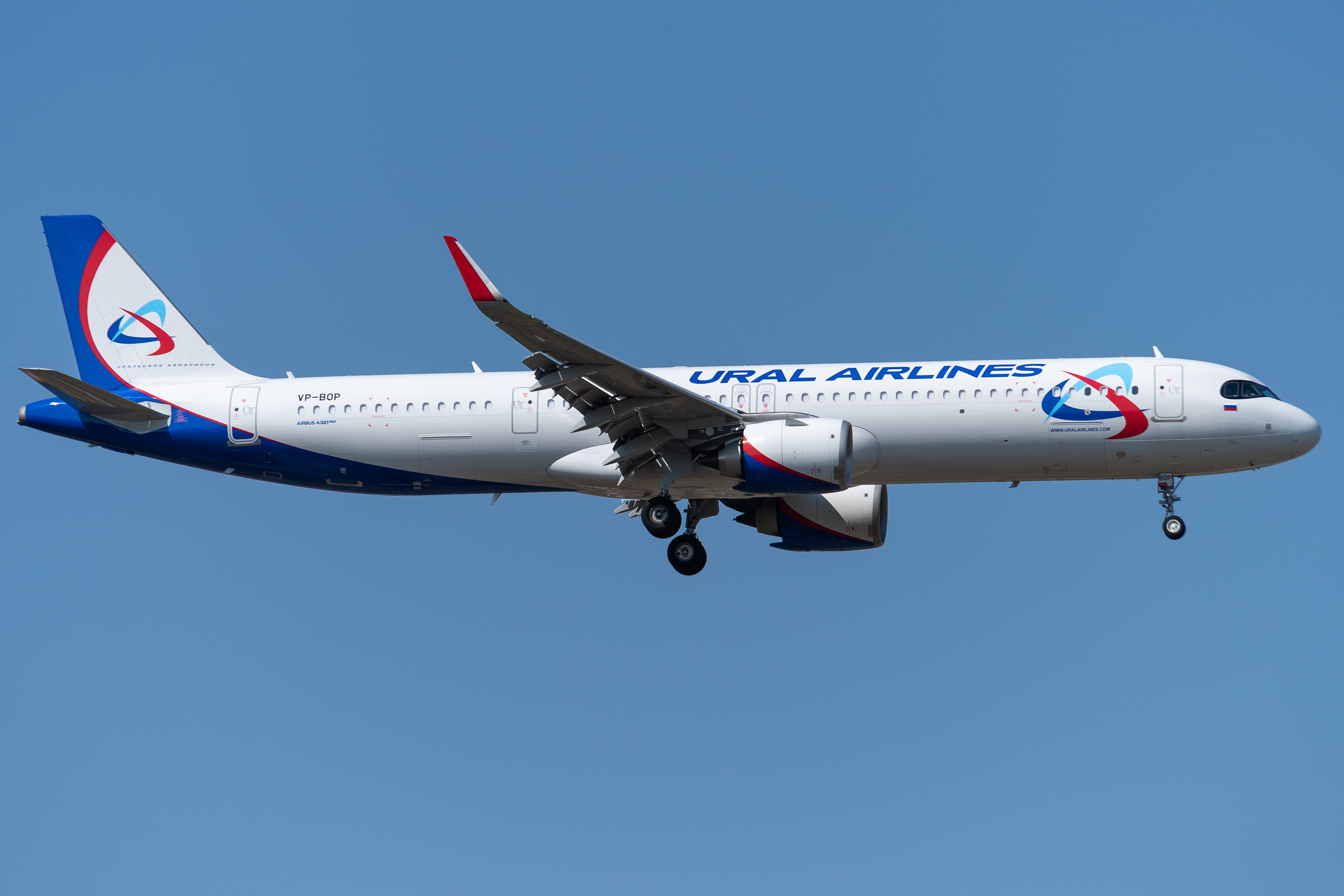
Ural Airlines Airbus A321neo

=== Current fleet ===
As of August 2025, Ural Airlines operates an all-Airbus A320 family fleet composed of the following aircraft:

Ural Airlines fleet
Aircraft	In service	Orders	Passengers			Notes
Aircraft	In service	Orders	J	Y	Total	Notes
Airbus A319-100	4	—	8	132	140	
Airbus A320-200	22	—	12	144	156	
Airbus A320-200	22	—	12	150	162	
Airbus A320neo	3	—	8	168	176	
Airbus A321-200	14	—	—	215	215	
Airbus A321-200	14	—	—	220	220	
Airbus A321neo	8	—	—	236	236	
Total	51	—				

=== Fleet development ===
Ural Airlines also started considering updating its fleet with newer Airbus A320neo family or Boeing 737 Next Generation narrow-body aircraft and is still considering purchasing Airbus A330 wide-body aircraft. It took delivery of its first Airbus A320neo in August 2019. The airline also considered purchasing Irkut MC-21s, but the plans were probably withdrawn. In 2022, Air Lease Corporation are seeking to recover one A320neo and one A321ceo, as the lease payments are not being made. In December 2023 an agreement was reached with leasing company AerCap to buy 19 Airbus planes, with help from the Russian National Wealth Fund.

== Accidents and incidents ==
- On 15 August 2019, Ural Airlines Flight 178, an Airbus A321 registered as VQ-BOZ, was scheduled to fly from Zhukovsky International Airport to Simferopol. 226 passengers and 7 crew were on board. The aircraft suffered a bird strike shortly after takeoff and made an emergency landing in a cornfield less than 3 nautical miles (5.6 km; 3.5 mi) from the runway with its landing gear up. Although 74 passengers sought medical treatment, only one major injury occurred, and all passengers survived.
- On 12 September 2023, Ural Airlines Flight 1383, an Airbus A320 registered as RA-73805, was scheduled to fly from Sochi International Airport to Omsk Tsentralny Airport. 159 passengers were on board. On approach into Omsk a hydraulic failure was reported. The aircraft successfully landed in a field near Kamenka Village in Ubinsky District, 180 km from Novosibirsk. No injuries or fatalities were reported.

== Passenger fraud incidents ==
In August 2023, a scandal broke out when wider public learned that one of the airline employees of Tatar ethnicity was for several years extorting money from passengers. The employee had used various excuses, particularly that passengers had to pay extra for luggage that was nevertheless undersize and underweight. He did not commit the fraud only against passengers from Tatarstan and North Caucasus regions as he had stated on his social media accounts.

== See also ==
- Babyflot
