= 2nd Sverdlovsk Air Enterprise =

Second level airline based in Yekaterinburg, Russia

2nd Sverdlovsk Air Enterprise Второе Свердловское авиапредприятие
| IATA | ICAO | Call sign |
|---|---|---|
| - | UKU | PYSHMA |
- Founded: 1993
- Ceased operations: 2011
- Hubs: Yekaterinburg Uktus Airport
- Fleet size: 30
- Destinations: 14
- Parent company: Rosimushchestvo
- Headquarters: Yekaterinburg, Russia
- Key people: Aleksandr Aleksandrovich Tyutin (Director)
- Website: http://www.uktus-avia.ru

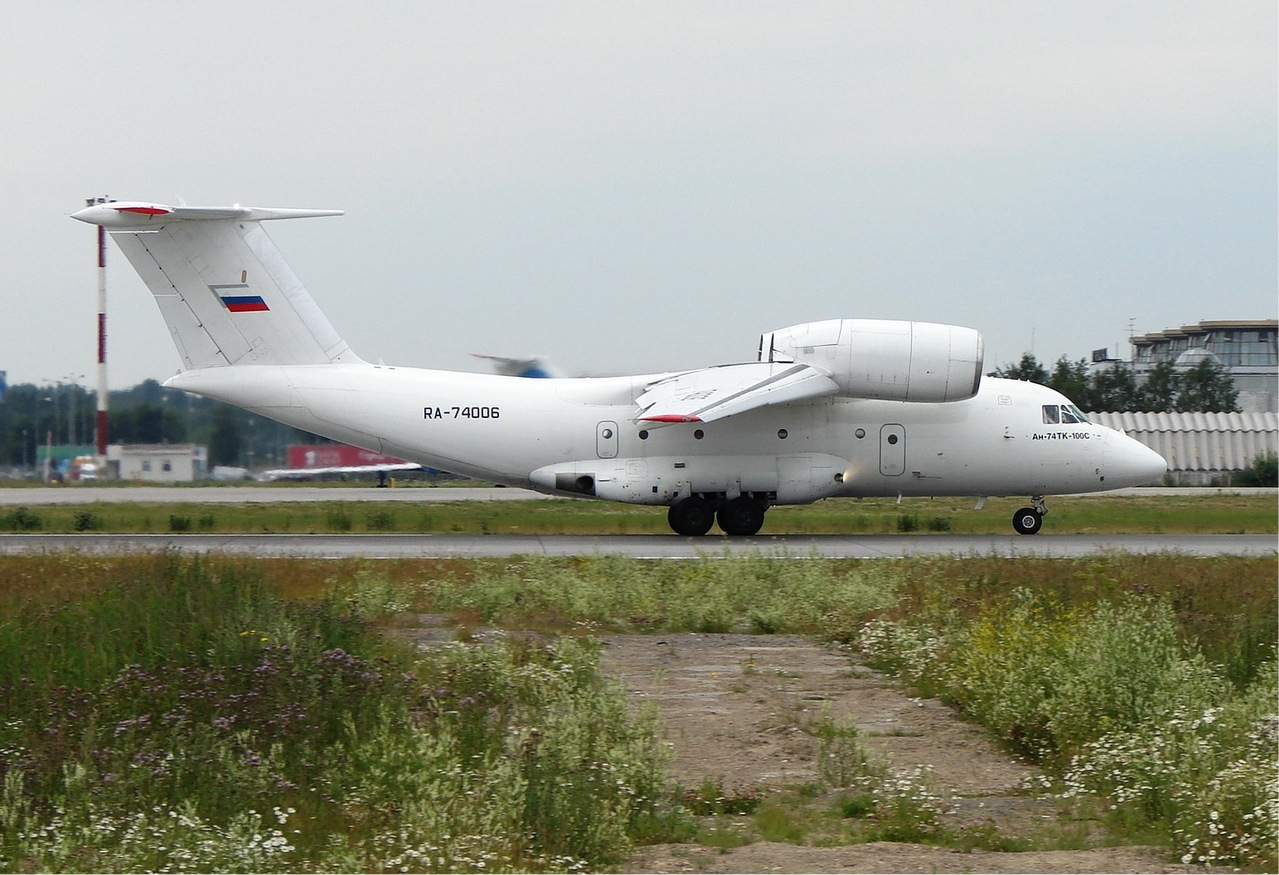
An-74

JSC "2nd Sverdlovsk Air Enterprise"(Russian: ОАО «Второе Свердловское авиапредприятие») was a second level airline based in Yekaterinburg, Russia. It was founded in 1993 and continued to operate for 18 years until closing down in 2011.

== Fleet ==
the 2nd Sverdlovsk Air Enterprise fleet included.

2nd Sverdlovsk Air Enterprise fleet
| Aircraft | Total | Passengers (Business*/Economy) | Notes |
|---|---|---|---|
| Antonov An-2 | 10 | | |
| Antonov An-74TK | 1 | | |
| Mil Mi-2 | 3 | | |
| Mil Mi-8 | 10 | | |
| Yakovlev Yak-40 | 6 | | |
| Pilatus PC-12 | 1 | | RA-01509 |
