= Gomelavia =

Airline from Belarus

Gomelavia Гомельавія

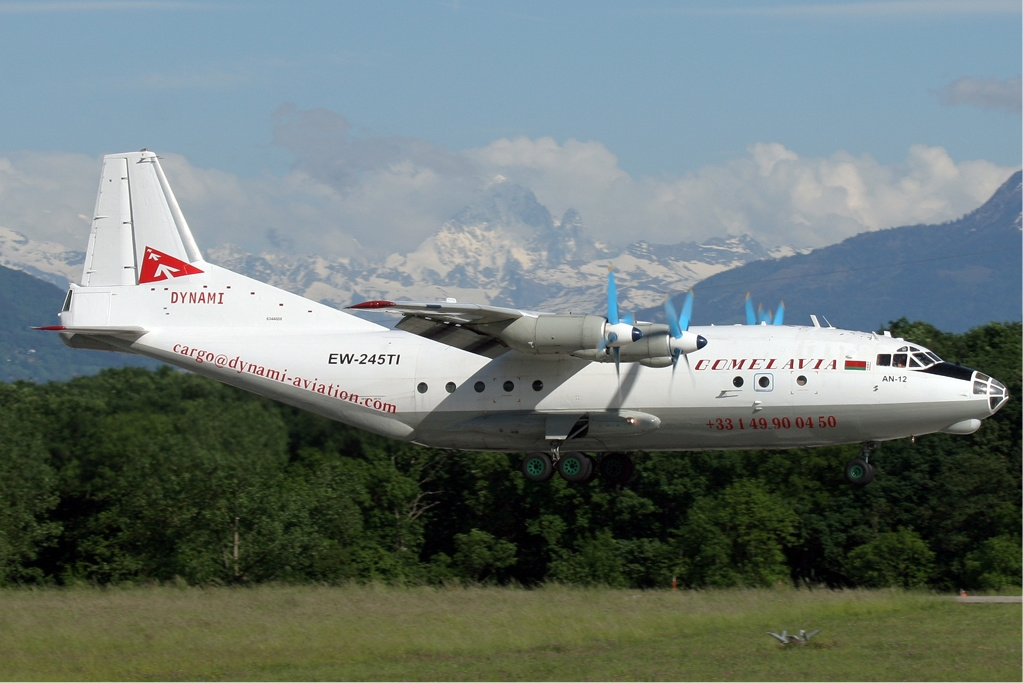
- Antonov An-12
IATA	ICAO	Call sign
YD	GOM	GOMEL
- Founded: 1996
- Ceased operations: February 22, 2011
- Hubs: Gomel Airport
- Fleet size: 3 (upon closure)
- Headquarters: Gomel, Belarus
- Website: gomelavia.com at the Wayback Archive

Gomelavia (Belarusian: Авіякампанія Гомельавія; Russian: Авиакомпания Гомельавиа) was an airline based in Gomel, Belarus.

== History ==
The airline was established in 1996 and operated domestic and regional, scheduled and chartered services, as well as aerial work using fixed-wing aircraft and helicopters. Its main base was Gomel Airport. The state-owned company ceased operations on 22 February 2011.

== Destinations ==
At the time of its closure, Gomelavia served Minsk, Kaliningrad and Moscow from its base at Gomel.

== Fleet ==
=== Last fleet ===
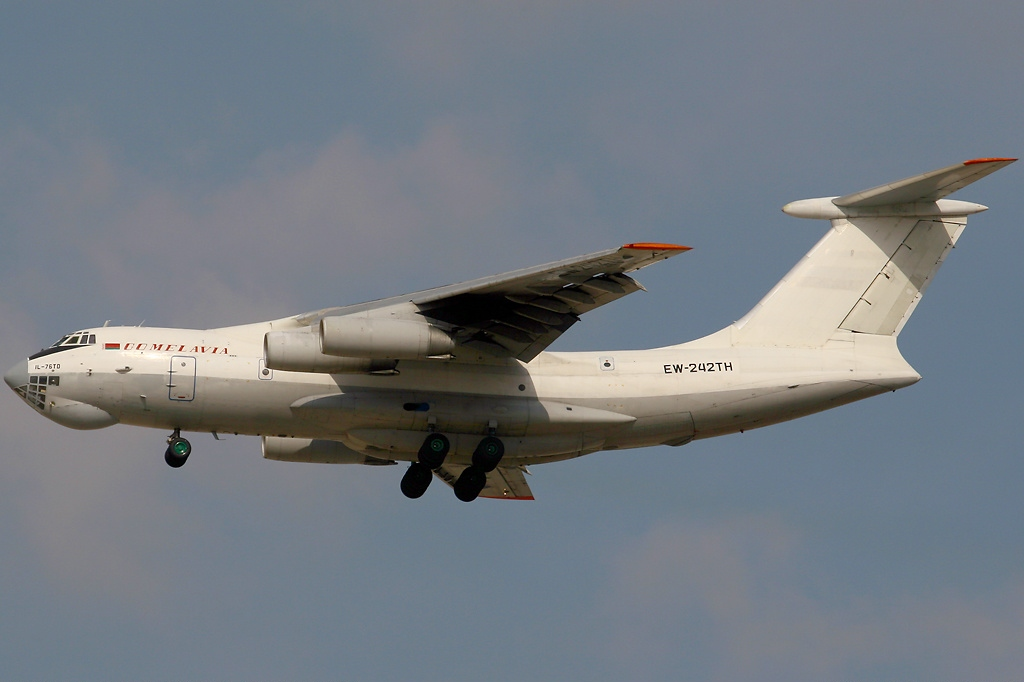
Ilyushin Il-76TD

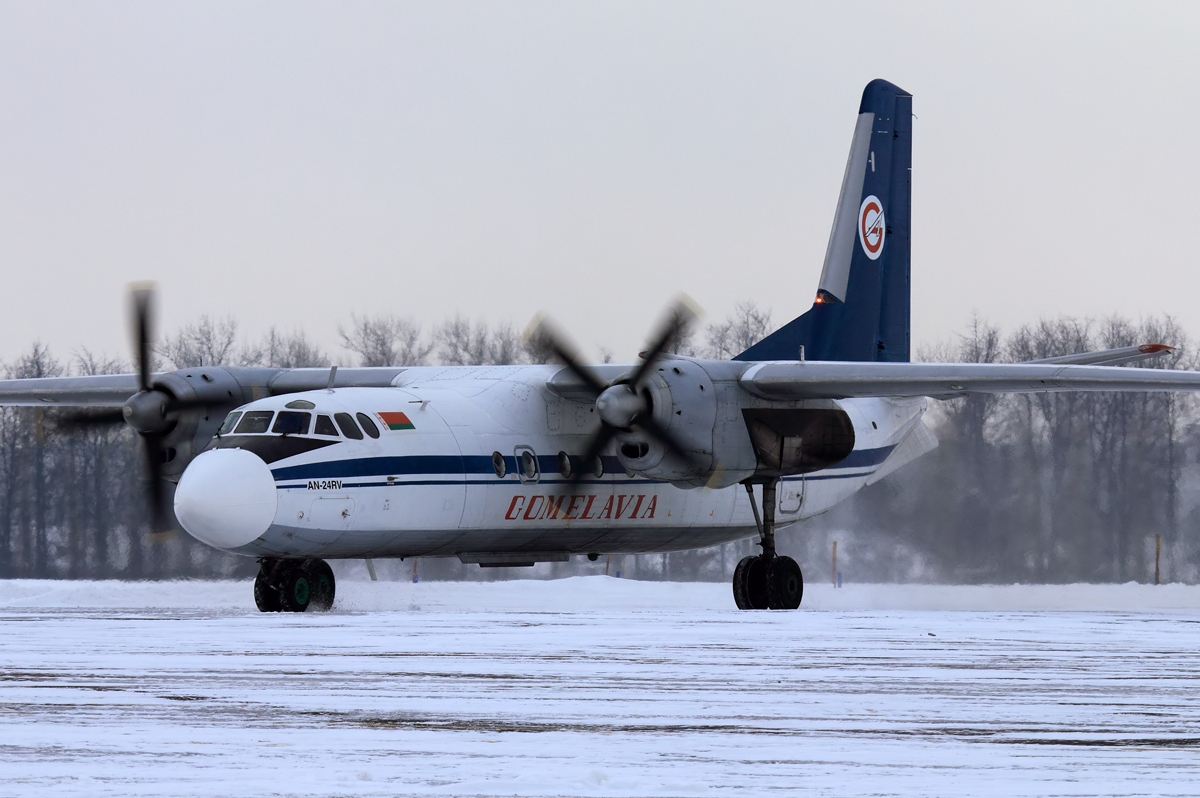
Antonov An-24

When it was shut down in 2011, Gomelavia operated the following aircraft:

- 3 Antonov An-24

=== Historic fleet ===
In 2007, the fleet had included the following aircraft:

- 1 Antonov An-12BP
- 1 Antonov An-12PS
- 4 Ilyushin Il-76TD
- 3 Ilyushin Il-76
- 1 Tupolev Tu-134A-3
