= Belgorod International Airport =

Airport in Belgorod, Russia

Belgorod International Airport Международный Аэропорт Белгород

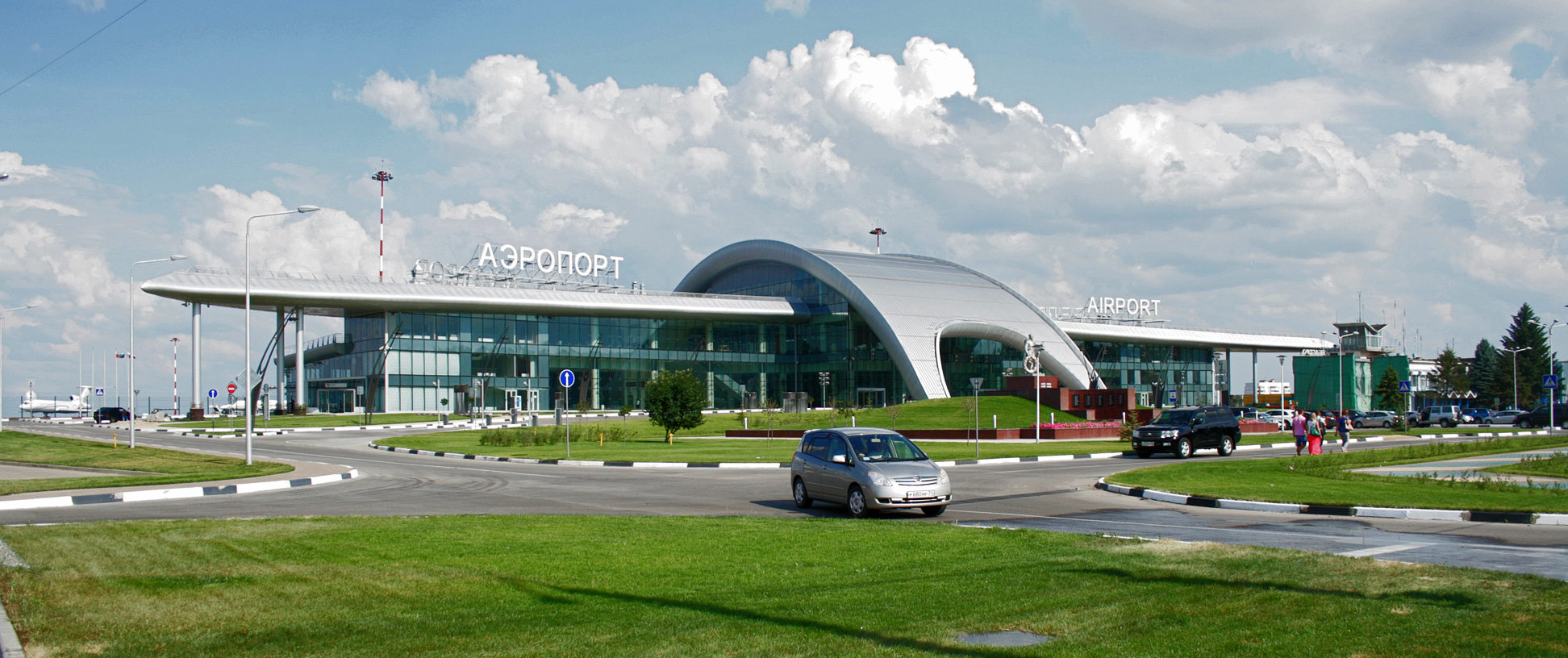
- IATA: EGO; ICAO: UUOB

Summary
- Airport type: Public
- Operator: JSC "Belgorod Air Enterprise"
- Serves: Belgorod
- Location: Belgorod, Russia
- Opened: 1954
- Passenger services ceased: February 24, 2022
- Elevation AMSL: 224 m (735 ft)
- Coordinates: 50°38′36″N 36°35′24″E
- Website: belgorodavia.ru/en/

Map
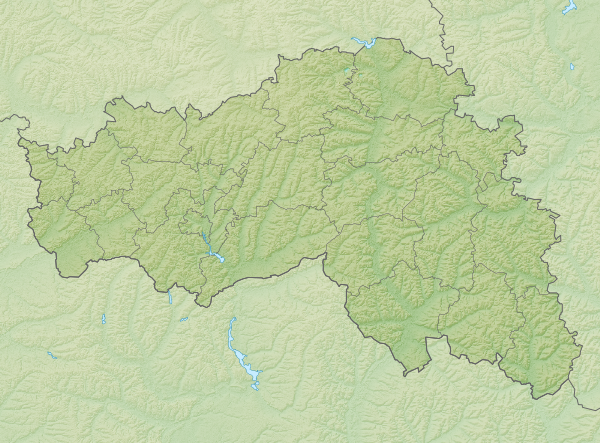
- Location of the airport in Belgorod Oblast Location of the airport in Russia Location of the airport in Europe

Runways
Direction	Length		Surface
Direction	m	ft	Surface
11/29	2,500	8,202	Asphalt concrete
12/30	2,417	7,930	Grass

Statistics (2021)
- Number of passengers: ▲582.531

Belgorod International Airport (Russian: Международный Аэропорт Белгород) (IATA: EGO, ICAO: UUOB) is an airport in Russia located 4 km north of Belgorod. It services narrow-body airliners (such as the Tupolev Tu-154, Tupolev Tu-204, Ilyushin Il-76, Boeing 737, Airbus A320, Boeing 757 etc.) and wide-body airliner Boeing 767. It conducts 24-hour flight operations. The airport was founded in 1954.

== History ==
The establishment date of the airport is considered to be 30 August 1954, when the order was issued by the Deputy Chief of Air Fleet under the Council of Ministers of the USSR and Belgorod landing pad began its transformation into a class IV Airport.

In 1954, the Kursk squadron relocated to the northern outskirts of Belgorod. These aircraft carried cargo and mail transportation, medical staff in the newly created districts of the Belgorod Oblast. The staff (technicians, drivers) did not exceed 20-30 people then.

In 1957, Yak-12 came into operation, capable of carrying 4 passengers or 350 kilograms of cargo. Aircraft used for flight on the territory of the region. In the years 1959–1968, made fleet capacity by AN-2 and Yak-12.

In 1969, the runway was put into operation. It began receiving short-haul aircraft: Yak-40, L-410, An-24. To fly to Moscow, Sochi, Anapa, Simferopol, Poltava, Donetsk. Created by air traffic control, 170 people work at the plant. Since 1970, flights operated to Rostov-on-Don, Voronezh, Krasnodar and Lipetsk.

In 1975, the airport admitted to reception of the Tupolev Tu-134. New lines opened up to new directions in Murmansk, Yekaterinburg, Astrakhan, Tyumen, Smolensk, Saratov and Mariupol.

In 1976–1989, years of the expansion of the geography of flights and an increase in the intensity of flights. 1981 saw the reconstruction of the runway. In the years 1985–1994 passenger flights were performed to Khabarovsk, Novosibirsk, Surgut, Tyumen, Murmansk, Arkhangelsk, Leningrad, Riga, Minsk, Kyiv, Lviv, Yerevan, Sochi, Odesa, Simferopol, Kaliningrad, Chelyabinsk and Baku.

In 1995, the airport was given the status of international airport. Along with the implementation of domestic flights, international flights started to operate to Turkey, Bulgaria, Israel, Hungary. Accepted cargo planes from India, China, the Netherlands, the United Arab Emirates.

In 1998–1999 following an economic meltdown, which resulted in a sharp decline in demand for passenger air travel and the reduction of the amount of work, number of flights reduced.

In 2000–2001, scheduled passenger transport resumed, including international with opening of new flights to Salekhard, Tyumen, Surgut, Norilsk, Yekaterinburg, Anapa, Murmansk, Sochi, Novy Urengoy, Soviet, Naryan-Mar, Arkhangelsk, Israel, Hungary, Cyprus and Bulgaria using Tu-134, Tu-154, Yak- 42, with a capacity of 70–160 passengers.

In April 2002, "the airline Belgorod" transformed into a Federal State Unitary Enterprise "Belgorod State Aviation Enterprise", and in December of the same year transformed into Open Joint Stock Company "Belgorod Airlines".

In February 2022, all civilian air traffic was indefinitely suspended in connection with the 2022 Russian invasion of Ukraine.

== Airlines and destinations ==
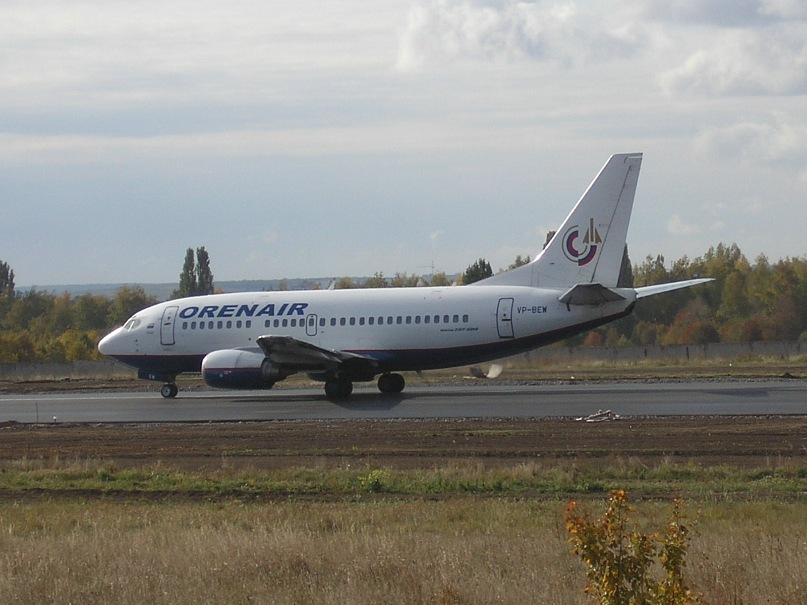
Orenair Boeing 737-500 at Belgorod Airport.

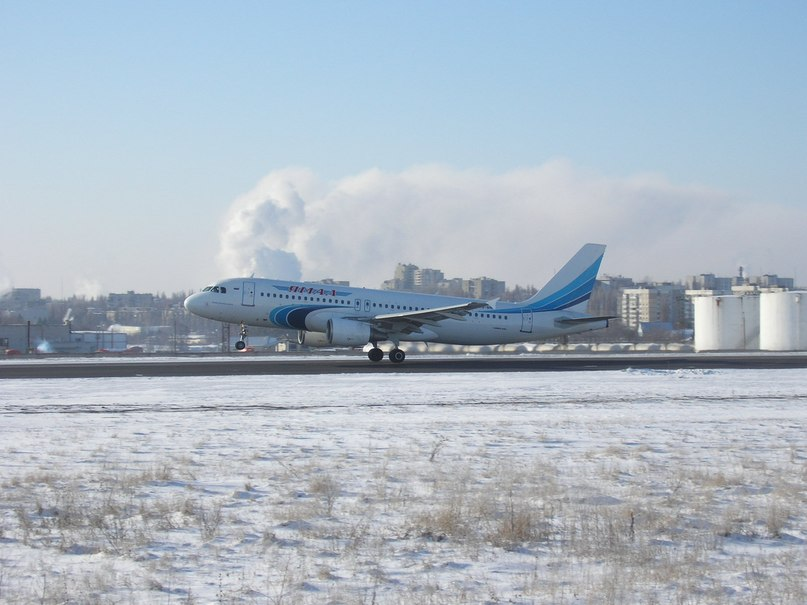
Yamal Airlines Airbus A320 taking off at Belgorod Airport.

Airlines	Destinations
Aeroflot	Moscow–Sheremeteyevo
Azimuth	Krasnodar, Mineralnye Vody
Azur Air	Seasonal charter: Enfidha
Ikar	Saint Petersburg
Nordstar Airlines	Seasonal: Nizhny Novgorod, Norilsk
Nordwind Airlines	Moscow–Sheremeteyevo, Saint Petersburg, Simferopol, Sochi, Yerevan; Seasonal charter: Antalya
Red Wings Airlines	Moscow–Domodedovo, Yekaterinburg
Rossiya	Moscow–Sheremeteyevo
RusLine	Kaliningrad
S7 Airlines	Moscow–Domodedovo
Smartavia	Seasonal: Simferopol, Sochi
Utair	Moscow–Vnukovo; Seasonal: Surgut

== Traffic statistics ==
Busiest domestic routes from Belgorod Int. Airport (2014)
Rank	City	Region	PAX	Flights
1	Moscow	City of Moscow; Moscow Oblast	161,605	2,022
2	Simferopol^{*}	Republic of Crimea^{*}	14,347	77
3	Novy Urengoy	Tyumen Oblast; Yamalo-Nenets Autonomous Okrug	12,848	58
4	Saint Petersburg	City of St Petersburg; Leningrad Oblast	9,406	139
5	Nyagan	Tyumen Oblast; Khanty–Mansi Autonomous Okrug	9,165	32
6	Kaliningrad	Kaliningrad Oblast	8,366	125
7	Krasnodar	Krasnodar Krai	8,343	98
8	Kazan	Tatarstan	6,300	127
9	Norilsk	Krasnoyarsk Krai	4,957	27
10	Yamburg	Tyumen Oblast; Yamalo-Nenets Autonomous Okrug	3,406	12

^* – Status of Crimea as Russian region disputed by Ukraine. See annexation of Crimea by the Russian Federation.

Busiest international routes from Belgorod Int. Airport (2014)
Rank	City	Country	PAX	Flights
1	Antalya	Turkey	76,182	203
2	Sharm el-Sheikh	Egypt	19,881	51
3	Hurghada	Egypt	19,391	50
4	Barcelona	Spain	7,801	24
5	Heraklion	Greece	4,939	15
6	Rhodes	Greece	3,114	12
7	Bishkek	Kyrgyzstan	2,916	17
8	Kos	Greece	2,634	9
9	Cam Ranh	Vietnam	2,322	7
10	Dabolim	India	2,192	6

== See also ==
- List of the busiest airports in Russia
- List of the busiest airports in Europe
- List of the busiest airports in the former USSR
- Belgorod Air Enterprise
