= Gomel Airport =

Airport in Gomel, Belarus

Gomel Airport Аэрапорт Гомель
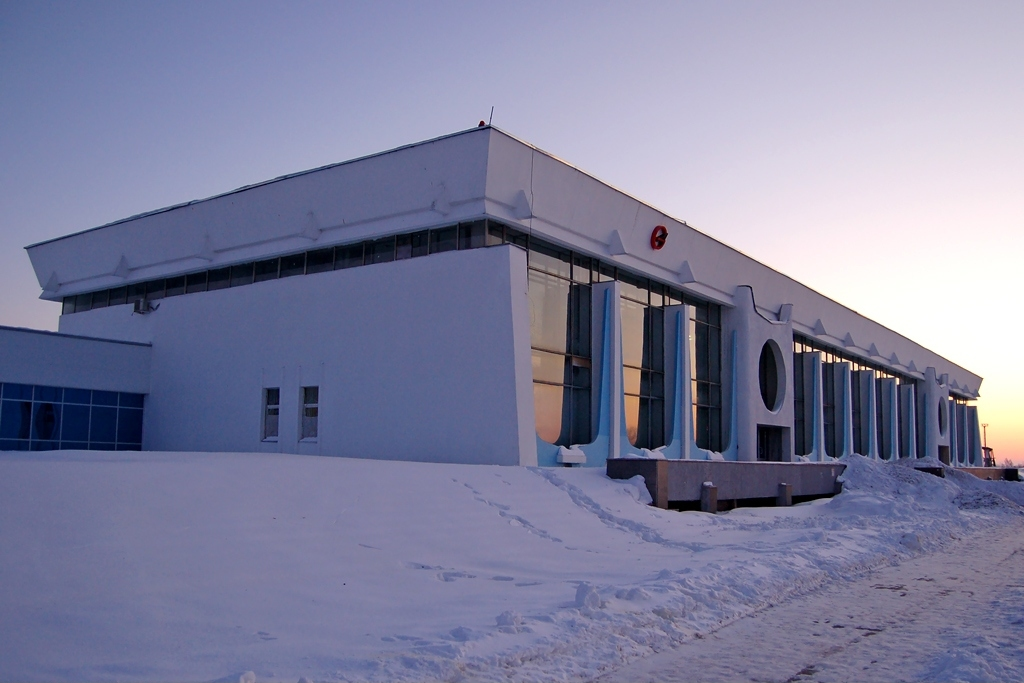
- IATA: GME; ICAO: UMGG

Summary
- Airport type: Public
- Serves: Gomel
- Location: Gomel District
- Elevation AMSL: 472 ft (144 m)
- Coordinates: 52°31′37″N 31°01′00″E
- Website: airportgme.ban.by

Map
- Location of airport in Belarus

Runways
Direction	Length		Surface
Direction	ft	m	Surface
11/29	8,431	2,570	Asphalt

Gomel Airport (IATA: GME, ICAO: UMGG) is an airport located 3 km north-east from Gomel, the second-largest city in Belarus. It was opened in 1968.

== History ==
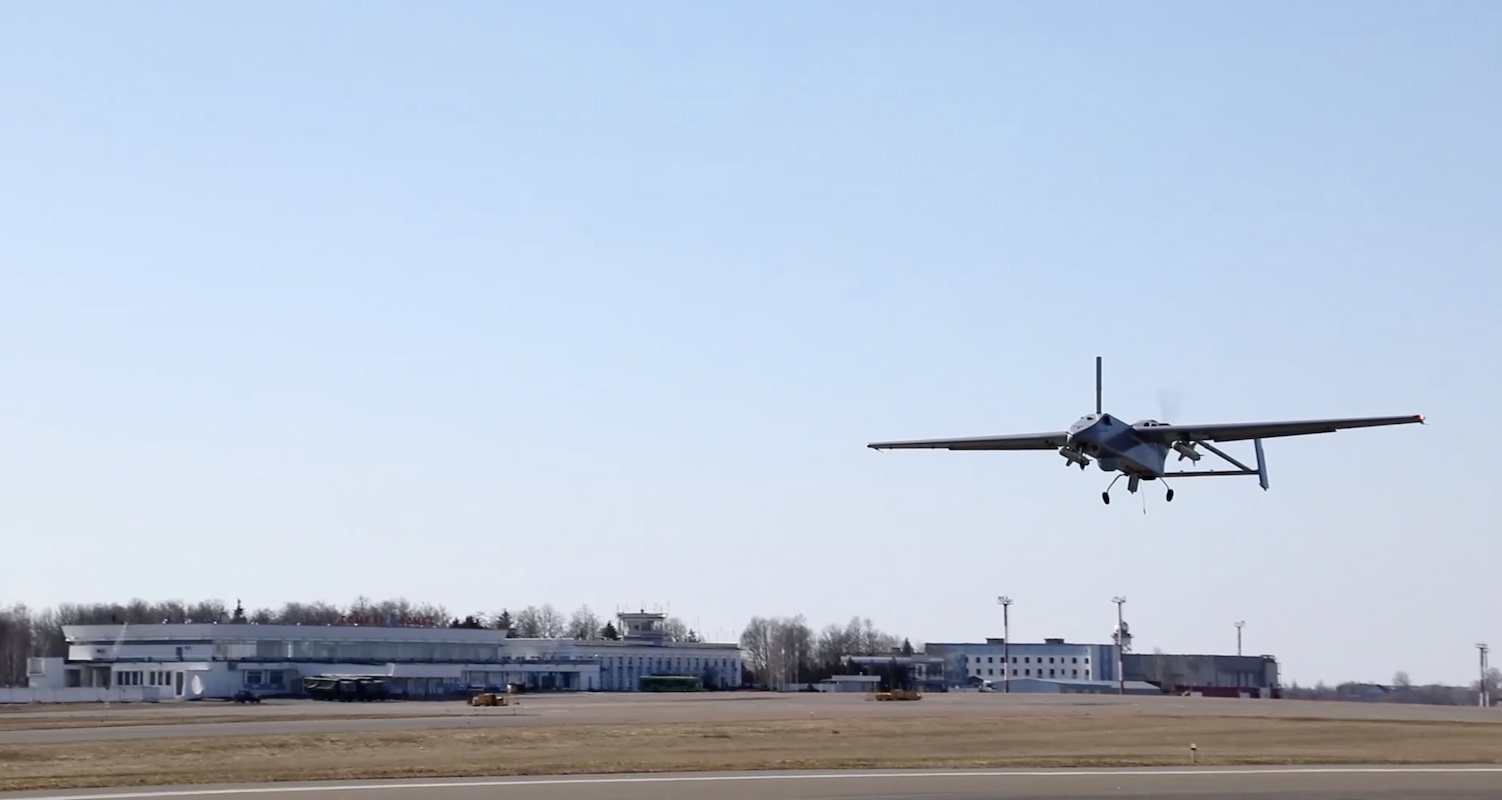
A Russian MoD video screenshot showing a UAV taking off from the Gomel Airport runway during the March 2022 airstrikes in Ukraine.

Since the mid-1950s, regular flights to Minsk and Kiev from the old Gomel airport to remote regional centers of the region, and sanitary and agricultural aviation were also based here. In 1968, the current airport was built with a concrete runway, to which An-24 was the first to land.

Gomel airport was a hub of Gomelavia Airlines, which ceased operations on 22 February 2011 due to bankruptcy.

From 25 July 2011 Belarusian flag carrier, Belavia, started serving flights from Gomel to Kaliningrad during summer seasons once again.

Besides Belarusian air companies, Latvian flag carrier AirBaltic had served flights between Gomel and Riga in 2006, but this destination has been defunct ever since.

In summer 2014, Belavia started to carry out new charter flights from Gomel to Thessaloniki and Burgas. Flights to Kaliningrad since summer 2014 have a stopover at Minsk National Airport.

During the 2022 Russian invasion of Ukraine, the Gomel Airport was used by the Russian military for military purposes, including launching air strikes against Ukraine, as evidenced by a video released by the Russian Ministry of Defence.

== Airlines and destinations ==
Airlines	Destinations
Belavia	Moscow–Sheremetyevo, Moscow–Vnukovo, Saint Petersburg; Seasonal charter: Antalya, Hurghada (begins 27 October 2026), Sharm El Sheikh

== Ground transport ==
Suburban bus route from airport to Gomel central bus station goes once a day in both directions.
