= Kostroma Airport =

Airport in Russia

Kostroma Airport Аэропорт Кострома
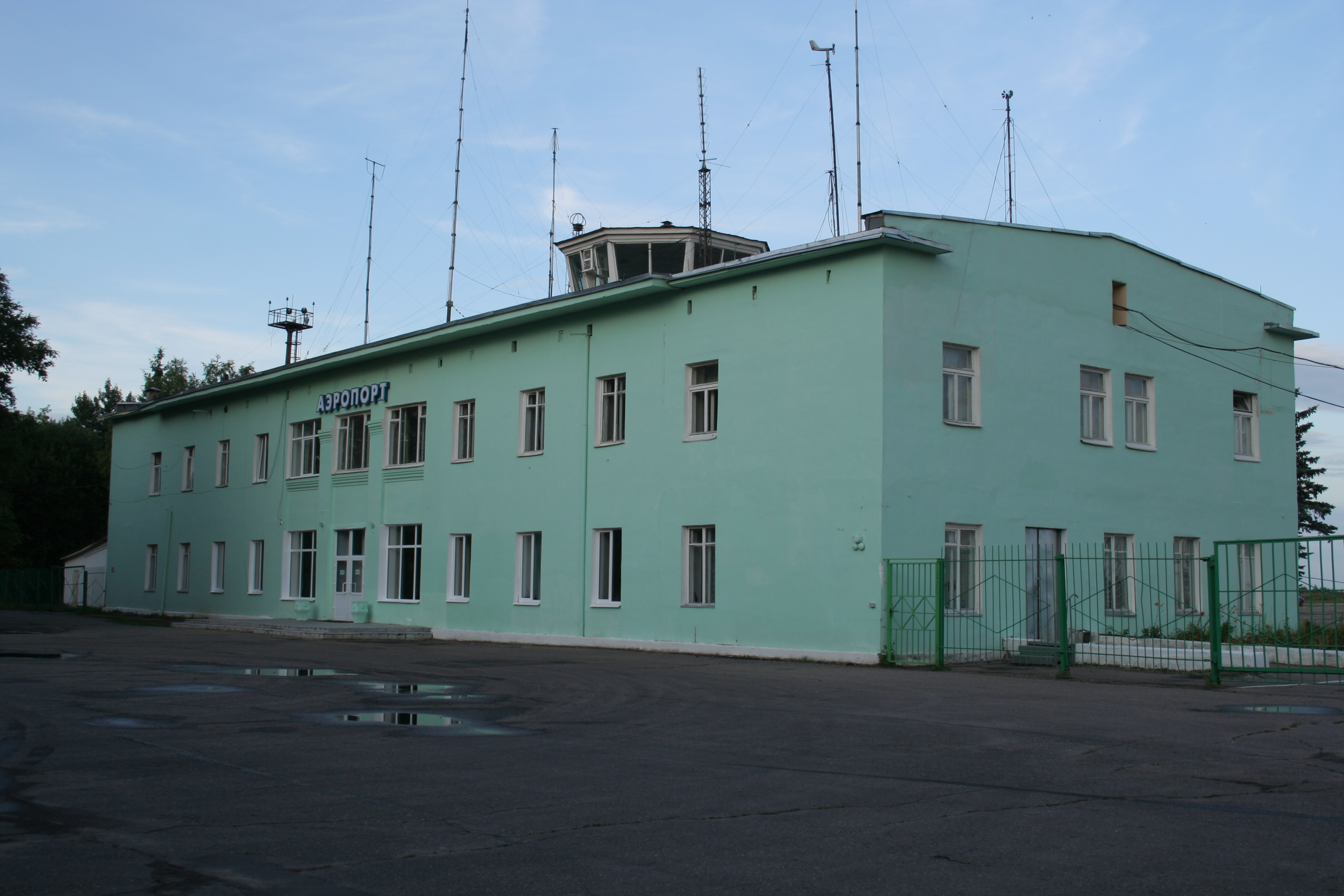
- IATA: KMW; ICAO: UUBA

Summary
- Airport type: Public
- Operator: JSC Kostroma Air Enterprise
- Location: Kostroma
- Elevation AMSL: 446 ft (136 m)
- Coordinates: 57°47′48″N 41°1′12″E
- Website: kostroma-avia.ru
- Interactive map of Kostroma Airport; Аэропорт Кострома

Runways
Direction	Length		Surface
Direction	ft	m	Surface
14/32	5,381	1,640	Asphalt

Kostroma Airport (Russian: Аэропорт Кострома) (IATA: KMW, ICAO: UUBA) is an airport in Russia located 6 km northeast of Kostroma. It services propeller-driven transports.

== Airlines and destinations ==
Airlines	Destinations
Kostroma Air Enterprise	Nizhny Novgorod, Saint Petersburg Seasonal: Kazan

== See also ==
- List of airports in Russia
