= Nefteyugansk Airport =

Airport in Nefteyugansk, Russia

- IATA: NFG; ICAO: USRN

Summary
- Airport type: Public
- Operator: JSC "Nefteyugansk United Airline Transport Company"
- Location: Nefteyugansk
- Elevation AMSL: 115 ft / 35 m
- Coordinates: 61°6′30″N 72°39′0″E
- Interactive map of Nefteyugansk Airport

Runways
Direction	Length		Surface
Direction	ft	m	Surface
14/32	8,860	2,700	Asphalt

Nefteyugansk Airport (Russian: Аэропорт Нефтеюганск) (IATA: NFG, ICAO: USRN) was an airport in Khanty–Mansi Autonomous Okrug, Russia, located four km (2.5 mi) northeast of Nefteyugansk. Serving central Siberia, it features a long asphalt runway, and it serviced airline traffic until it was closed in 2005.

== See also ==
- List of airports in Russia
