= List of Ural Airlines destinations =

Ural Airlines serves the following destinations:

== List ==
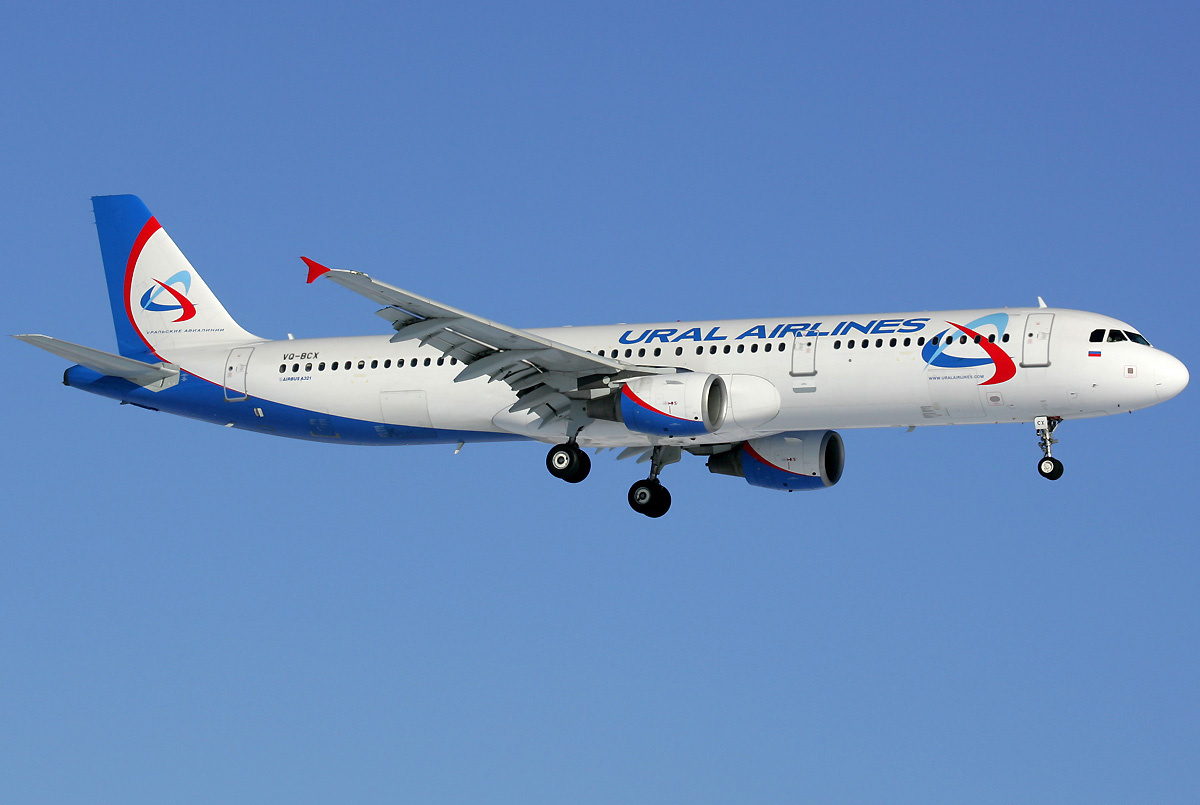
Ural Airlines Airbus A321-200

Country	City	Airport	Notes	Ref.
Albania	Tirana	Tirana International Airport Nënë Tereza	Terminated	
Armenia	Gyumri	Shirak Airport	Terminated	
Armenia	Yerevan	Zvartnots International Airport		
Azerbaijan	Baku	Heydar Aliyev International Airport		
Azerbaijan	Ganja	Ganja International Airport	Terminated	
Azerbaijan	Qabala	Qabala International Airport	Terminated	
Bahrain	Manama	Bahrain International Airport	Terminated	
Bulgaria	Burgas	Burgas Airport	Terminated	
Bulgaria	Varna	Varna Airport	Terminated	
China	Beijing	Beijing Capital International Airport	Terminated	
China	Beijing	Beijing Daxing International Airport		
China	Changchun	Changchun Longjia International Airport	Terminated	
China	Chengdu	Chengdu Shuangliu International Airport	Terminated	
China	Guangzhou	Guangzhou Baiyun International Airport	Terminated	
China	Harbin	Harbin Taiping International Airport	Resumes 29 March 2026	
China	Hefei	Hefei Xinqiao International Airport	Terminated	
China	Ordos	Ordos Ejin Horo Airport	Terminated	
China	Sanya	Sanya Phoenix International Airport	Seasonal charter	
China	Shanghai	Shanghai Pudong International Airport	Terminated	
China	Xi'an	Xi'an Xianyang International Airport	Terminated	
Croatia	Pula	Pula Airport	Terminated	
Croatia	Split	Split Airport	Terminated	
Cyprus	Larnaca	Larnaca International Airport	Terminated	
Czech Republic	Karlovy Vary	Karlovy Vary Airport	Terminated	
Czech Republic	Prague	Václav Havel Airport Prague	Terminated	
Egypt	Hurghada	Hurghada International Airport	Seasonal charter	
Egypt	Sharm El Sheikh	Sharm El Sheikh International Airport	Seasonal charter	
Egypt	Cairo	Cairo International Airport	Terminated	
Finland	Helsinki	Helsinki Airport	Terminated	
France	Bordeaux	Bordeaux–Mérignac Airport	Terminated	
France	Montpellier	Montpellier–Méditerranée Airport	Terminated	
France	Paris	Charles de Gaulle Airport	Terminated	
Georgia	Batumi	Alexander Kartveli Batumi International Airport	Terminated	
Georgia	Kutaisi	David the Builder Kutaisi International Airport	Terminated	
Georgia	Tbilisi	Shota Rustaveli Tbilisi International Airport	Terminated	
Germany	Frankfurt	Frankfurt Airport	Terminated	
Germany	Munich	Munich Airport	Terminated	
Germany	Stuttgart	Stuttgart Airport	Terminated	
Greece	Athens	Athens International Airport	Terminated	
Greece	Heraklion	Heraklion International Airport	Terminated	
Hungary	Budapest	Budapest Ferenc Liszt International Airport	Terminated	
India	Delhi	Indira Gandhi International Airport	Begins 27 October 2026	
India	Mumbai	Chhatrapati Shivaji Maharaj International Airport	Terminated	
Indonesia	Batam	Hang Nadim Airport	Terminated	
Israel	Eilat	Ovda Airport	Terminated	
Israel	Eilat	Ramon Airport	Terminated	
Israel	Tel Aviv	Ben Gurion Airport	Terminated	
Italy	Bologna	Bologna Guglielmo Marconi Airport	Terminated	
Italy	Catania	Catania–Fontanarossa Airport	Terminated	
Italy	Milan	Milan Malpensa Airport	Terminated	
Italy	Rimini	Federico Fellini International Airport	Terminated	
Italy	Rome	Leonardo da Vinci–Fiumicino Airport	Terminated	
Italy	Venice	Venice Marco Polo Airport	Terminated	
Japan	Sapporo	New Chitose Airport	Terminated	
Kazakhstan	Almaty	Almaty International Airport	Terminated	
Kazakhstan	Astana	Nursultan Nazarbayev International Airport	Terminated	
Kyrgyzstan	Bishkek	Manas International Airport		
Kyrgyzstan	Osh	Osh Airport		
Laos	Vientiane	Wattay International Airport	Terminated	
Moldova	Chișinău	Chișinău International Airport	Terminated	
Mongolia	Ulaanbaatar	Buyant-Ukhaa International Airport	Terminated	
Montenegro	Podgorica	Podgorica Airport	Terminated	
Montenegro	Tivat	Tivat Airport	Terminated	
Poland	Warsaw	Warsaw Chopin Airport	Terminated	
Portugal	Lisbon	Lisbon Airport	Terminated	
Qatar	Doha	Hamad International Airport	Begins 19 March 2026	
Russia	Anapa	Anapa Airport	Terminated	
Russia	Barnaul	Barnaul Airport		
Russia	Blagoveshchensk	Ignatyevo Airport		
Russia	Chelyabinsk	Balandino Airport		
Russia	Chita	Kadala Airport		
Russia	Gelendzhik	Gelendzhik Airport	Seasonal	
Russia	Irkutsk	International Airport Irkutsk		
Russia	Kaliningrad	Khrabrovo Airport		
Russia	Kaluga	Grabtsevo Airport	Terminated	
Russia	Kazan	Ğabdulla Tuqay Kazan International Airport		
Russia	Kemerovo	Alexei Leonov Kemerovo International Airport	Seasonal	
Russia	Krasnodar	Krasnodar International Airport		
Russia	Krasnoyarsk	Yemelyanovo International Airport		
Russia	Magadan	Sokol Airport		
Russia	Makhachkala	Uytash Airport		
Russia	Mineralnye Vody	Mineralnye Vody Airport		
Russia	Moscow	Moscow Domodedovo Airport	Hub	
Russia	Moscow	Sheremetyevo International Airport	Terminated	
Russia	Moscow	Zhukovsky International Airport	Secondary hub	
Russia	Nadym	Nadym Airport	Terminated	
Russia	Nizhnekamsk	Begishevo Airport	Terminated	
Russia	Nizhnevartovsk	Nizhnevartovsk Airport		
Russia	Nizhny Novgorod	Strigino Airport	Seasonal charter	
Russia	Novosibirsk	Tolmachevo Airport	Terminated	
Russia	Novy Urengoy	Novy Urengoy Airport	Terminated	
Russia	Noyabrsk	Noyabrsk Airport		
Russia	Perm	Bolshoye Savino Airport	Terminated	
Russia	Petropavlovsk-Kamchatsky	Petropavlovsk-Kamchatsky Airport	Terminated	
Russia	Rostov-on-Don	Platov International Airport	Terminated	
Russia	Rostov-on-Don	Rostov-on-Don Airport	Terminated	
Russia	Saint Petersburg	Pulkovo Airport	Secondary hub	
Russia	Salekhard	Salekhard Airport	Terminated	
Russia	Samara	Kurumoch International Airport		
Russia	Sochi	Sochi International Airport		
Russia	Surgut	Surgut International Airport	Terminated	
Russia	Tyumen	Roshchino International Airport	Terminated	
Russia	Ufa	Mustai Karim Ufa International Airport		
Russia	Ulan-Ude	Baikal International Airport	Terminated	
Russia	Vladikavkaz	Beslan Airport	Seasonal charter	
Russia	Vladivostok	Vladivostok International Airport		
Russia	Volgograd	Gumrak Airport		
Russia	Yakutsk	Yakutsk Airport	Terminated	
Russia	Yekaterinburg	Koltsovo International Airport	Hub	
Occupied Ukraine (Note: Disputed. See Annexation of Crimea by the Russian Federation.)	Simferopol	Simferopol International Airport	Terminated	
Serbia	Belgrade	Belgrade Nikola Tesla Airport	Terminated	
Spain	Barcelona	Barcelona–El Prat Airport	Terminated	
Spain	Girona	Girona–Costa Brava Airport	Terminated	
Switzerland	Geneva	Geneva Airport	Terminated	
Tajikistan	Dushanbe	Dushanbe International Airport		
Tajikistan	Khujand	Khujand Airport		
Tajikistan	Kulob	Kulob Airport		
Thailand	Bangkok	Suvarnabhumi Airport	Terminated	
Thailand	Krabi	Krabi International Airport	Terminated	
Thailand	Pattaya	U-Tapao International Airport	Terminated	
Tunisia	Enfidha	Enfidha-Hammamet International Airport	Terminated	
Turkey	Antalya	Antalya Airport	Seasonal charter	
Turkey	Dalaman	Dalaman Airport	Seasonal charter	
Turkey	Istanbul	Istanbul Airport		
Ukraine	Kharkiv	Kharkiv International Airport	Terminated	
Ukraine	Kyiv	Boryspil International Airport	Terminated	
Ukraine	Kyiv	Kyiv International Airport (Zhuliany)	Terminated	
Ukraine	Odesa	Odesa International Airport	Terminated	
United Arab Emirates	Dubai	Al Maktoum International Airport		
United Arab Emirates	Dubai	Dubai International Airport	Terminated	
United Arab Emirates	Ras Al Khaimah	Ras Al Khaimah International Airport	Terminated	
United Arab Emirates	Sharjah	Sharjah International Airport	Seasonal charter	
United Kingdom	London	London Stansted Airport	Terminated	
Uzbekistan	Bukhara	Bukhara International Airport	Terminated	
Uzbekistan	Fergana	Fergana International Airport		
Uzbekistan	Namangan	Namangan Airport		
Uzbekistan	Nukus	Nukus Airport	Terminated	
Uzbekistan	Qarshi	Qarshi Airport		
Uzbekistan	Samarqand	Samarqand International Airport		
Uzbekistan	Tashkent	Islam Karimov Tashkent International Airport		
