= Narimanovo Airport =

Airport in Astrakhan, Russia

Narimanovo Airport Аэропорт Нариманово

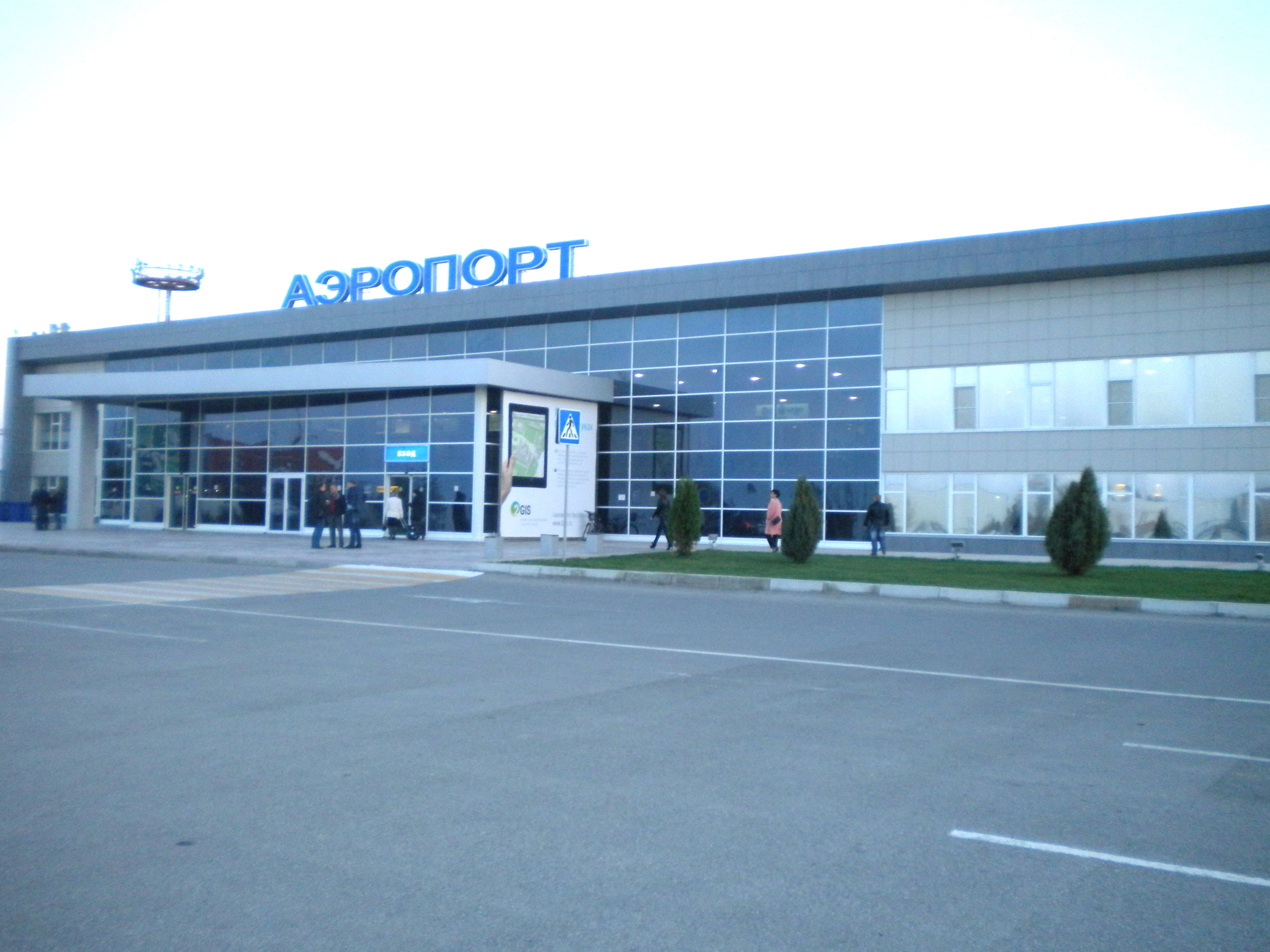
- IATA: ASF; ICAO: URWA

Summary
- Airport type: Public
- Operator: JSC "Aeroport Astrakhan"
- Serves: Astrakhan
- Location: Astrakhan, Russia
- Elevation AMSL: −65 ft (−20 m)
- Coordinates: 46°17′00″N 48°00′22.60″E
- Website: www.airport.astrakhan.ru

Map
- Location of airport in Astrakhan Oblast

Runways
Direction	Length		Surface
Direction	ft	m	Surface
09/27	10,499	3,200	Concrete
11/29	5,090	1,551	Dirt

Narimanovo Airport, officially Astrakhan Boris M. Kustodiev International Airport, (Russian: Аэропорт Нариманово) (IATA: ASF, ICAO: URWA) is an international airport in Astrakhan, a city in southern Russia near the Caspian Sea. It is operated by JSC "Aeroport Astrakhan". In 2018 the airport was renamed in honor of painter Boris Kustodiev.

== Airlines and destinations ==
Airlines	Destinations
Aeroflot	Moscow–Sheremetyevo
Azerbaijan Airlines	Baku
azimuth	Baku, Mineralnye Vody, Sochi, Ufa
Ikar	Seasonal: Kazan
IrAero	Seasonal: Sochi
Pobeda	Moscow–Sheremetyevo, Moscow-Vnukovo, St. Petersburg
Pouya Air	Seasonal: Rasht
Red Wings Airlines	Yekaterinburg
Rossiya Airlines	Moscow–Sheremetyevo
Tailwind Airlines	Seasonal charter: Antalya

== See also ==
- List of airports in Russia
