= Stavropol Shpakovskoye Airport =

Airport in Russia

Stavropol Shpakovskoye Airport Аэропорт Ставрополь-Шпаковское
- Satellite imagery of Stavropol Shpakovskoye Airport

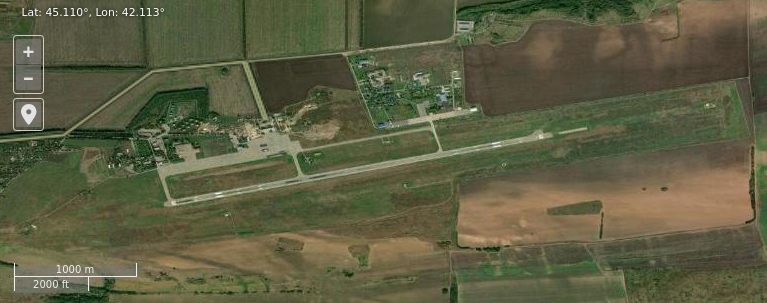
- IATA: STW; ICAO: URMT

Summary
- Airport type: Public
- Operator: JSC, Airport Stavropol
- Serves: Stavropol
- Location: Stavropol, Russia
- Elevation AMSL: 1,486 ft / 453 m
- Coordinates: 45°6′36″N 42°6′48″E
- Website: stavavia.ru

Map
- Location of airport in Stavropol Krai

Runways
Direction	Length		Surface
Direction	ft	m	Surface
07/25	8,631	2,631	Asphalt

Stavropol Shpakovskoye Airport (IATA: STW, ICAO: URMT) (sometimes appearing as Mikhaylovskoye) is an airport in Stavropol Krai, Russia, located 13 km northeast of Stavropol.

It serves medium-sized airliners with 14 parking spaces.

== History ==
In 1934, in the city of Pyatigorsk, the 220th civil aviation detachment was created to transport passengers, cargo and mail throughout the region; this event is the beginning of the history of the Stavropol aviation enterprise.

In 1937, the 220th aviation detachment was transferred to Voroshilovsk (now Stavropol). The airfield was located in an open area east of the railway station (area of the Elektroavtomatika plant).

With the German Operation Barbarossa, the entire personnel of the 220th aviation squadron went to the front. During the war years, many of the Stavropol air squad were awarded military orders, and the pilot B.T. Kalinkin (ru:Калинкин, Борис Тихонович) became a Hero of the Soviet Union for saving Josip Broz Tito during the siege of the Yugoslav capital Belgrade.

It was also a small military training base, previously home to the Stavropol Higher Military Aviation School of Pilots and Navigators PVO im. Marshal of Aviation V.A. Sudts (SVVAULSh), and 163rd Separate Training Aviation Squadron (OUAE) flying the Mil Mi-8. The school was formed on 1 November 1969 and controlled four training aviation regiments (at Salsk, Khankala, Tikhoretsk, and Kholodnogorsk). In 1993, the school was renamed the Stavropol Higher Aviation Engineering Institute, with schools at Stavropol, Daugavpils and Lomonosov.

The Institute was disestablished in 2009-10.

== Airlines and destinations ==
Airlines	Destinations
Aeroflot	Moscow–Sheremetyevo
Azimuth	Sochi
Pobeda	Moscow–Sheremetyevo, Saint Petersburg
Red Wings Airlines	Yekaterinburg
Utair	Surgut

== See also ==
- List of airports in Russia
- List of military airbases in Russia
