= Kurgan Airport =

Airport in Kurgan, Russia

Kurgan Airport Аэропорт Курган

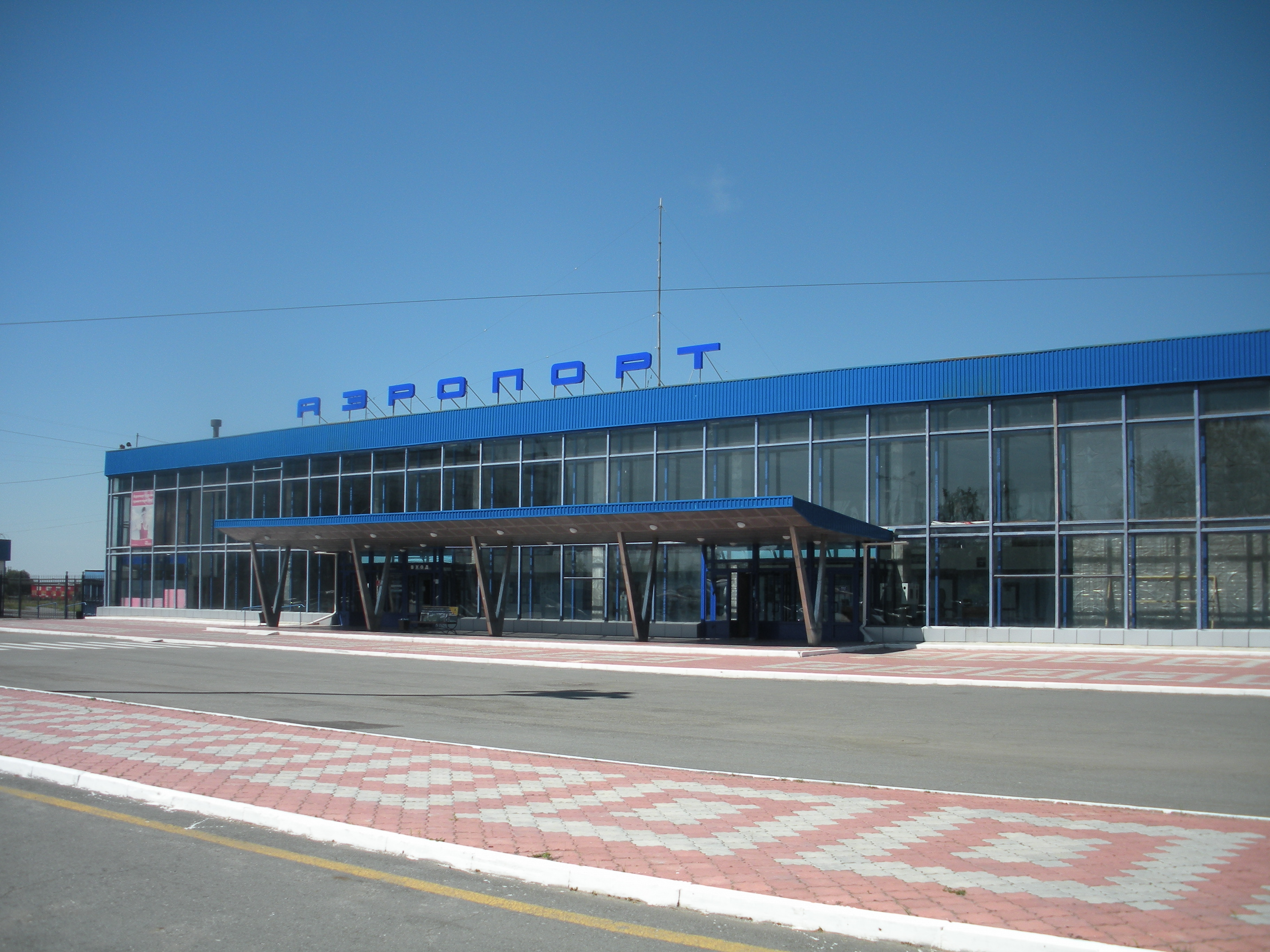
- IATA: KRO; ICAO: USUU

Summary
- Airport type: Public
- Operator: JSC Kurgan Airport
- Serves: Kurgan
- Location: Kurgan, Kurgan Oblast, Russia
- Opened: September 11, 1923
- Hub for: Sibia
- Elevation AMSL: 239 ft / 73 m
- Coordinates: 55°28′30″N 65°25′0″E
- Website: airkurgan.ru/

Map
- Location of airport in Kurgan Oblast

Runways
Direction	Length		Surface
Direction	ft	m	Surface
02/20	8,533	2,601	Asphalt

Statistics (2014)
- Passengers: 81,541
- Passenger change 13–14: ▲20.6%
- Aircraft movements: 842
- Movements change 13–14: ▲6.4%

Kurgan Airport (Russian: Аэропорт Курган) (IATA: KRO, ICAO: USUU) is an airport in Russia located 6 km northeast of Kurgan. It handles medium-sized airliners.

== Airlines and destinations ==
As of May 2026 airport serves following destinations:

Airlines	Destinations
Ikar	Saint Petersburg, Sochi
NordStar	Moscow–Domodedovo
Utair	Seasonal: Surgut

== See also ==
- List of airports in Russia
- List of the busiest airports in Russia
- List of the busiest airports in the former USSR
