= KVX =

KVX may refer to:

- Pobedilovo Airport, IATA code KVX
- Kosovo national futsal team, FIFA code KVX
