= Maksimovka Airport =

- IATA: none; ICAO: UWUM

Summary
- Airport type: Public
- Location: Ufa
- Elevation AMSL: 325 ft (99 m)
- Coordinates: 54°49′48″N 056°10′6″E
- Interactive map of Maksimovka Airport

Runways
Direction	Length		Surface
Direction	ft	m	Surface
01/19	6,562	2,000	Asphalt

Maksimovka Airport (Bashkir: Максимовка Аэропорты) (ICAO: UWUM) is an airport in Bashkortostan, Russia located in the northeast part of Ufa. Services small transport aircraft. It is secondary to the larger Ufa Airport southwest of the city.
