= Omsk Central Airport =

Airport in Russia

Central Airport Аэропорт Центральный
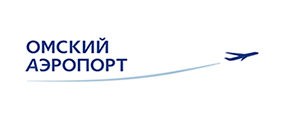

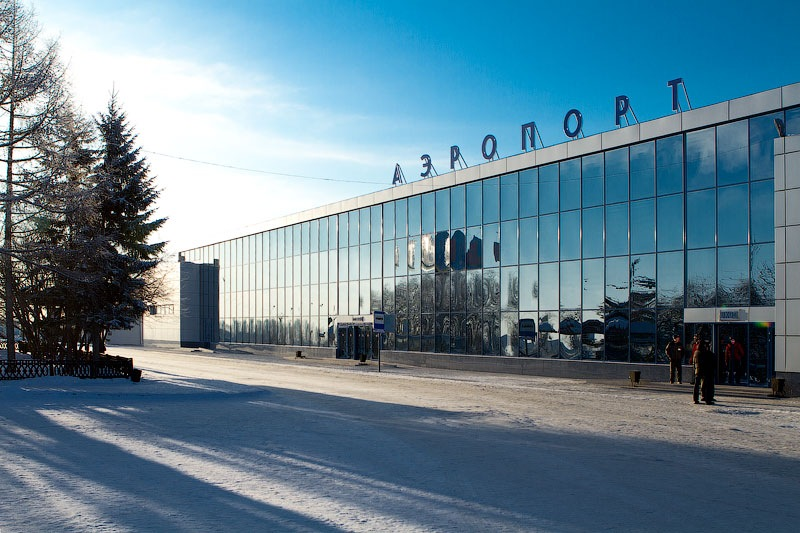
- IATA: OMS; ICAO: UNOO

Summary
- Airport type: Public
- Operator: JSC "Omsk Airport"
- Serves: Omsk
- Location: Omsk, Russia
- Hub for: Red Wings Airlines
- Elevation AMSL: 312 ft (95 m)
- Coordinates: 54°58′0″N 73°18′30″E
- Website: aeroomsk.ru

Map
- Location of airport in Omsk Oblast OMS (Russia)

Runways
Direction	Length		Surface
Direction	m	ft	Surface
06/24	2,876	9,435	Grass
07/25	2,500	8,202	Asphalt
15/33	725	2,380	Grass

Statistics (2018)
- Passengers: 1,088,926
- Sources: Russian Federal Air Transport Agency (see also provisional 2018 statistics)

Central Airport (Russian: Аэропорт Центральный (IATA: OMS, ICAO: UNOO)) is an airport in Omsk Oblast, Russia, located 5 km southwest of Omsk. It is capable of handling wide-bodied aircraft. 975,000 passengers passed through the airport in 2013.

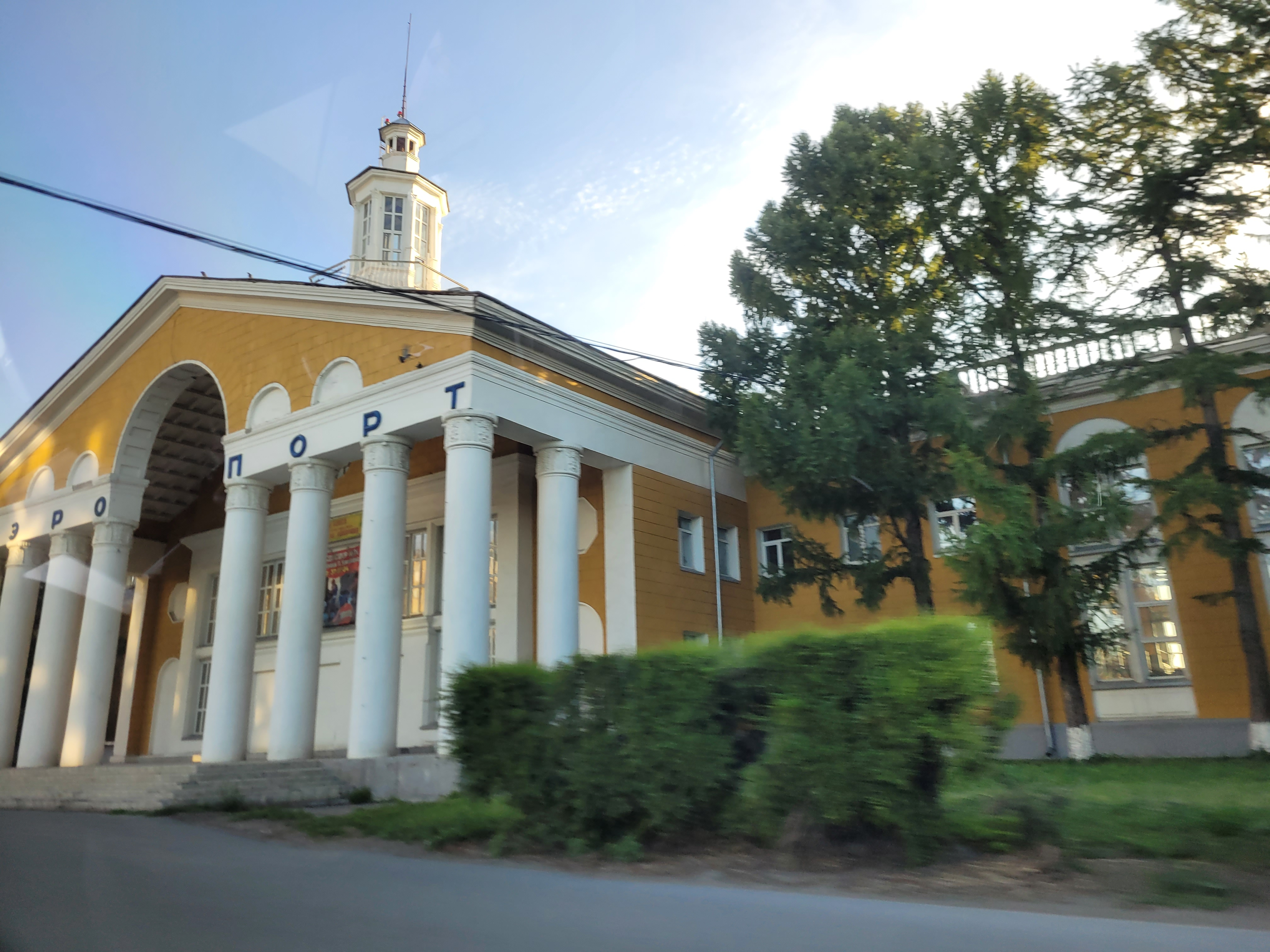
Disused 1957 terminal building

== Airlines and destinations ==
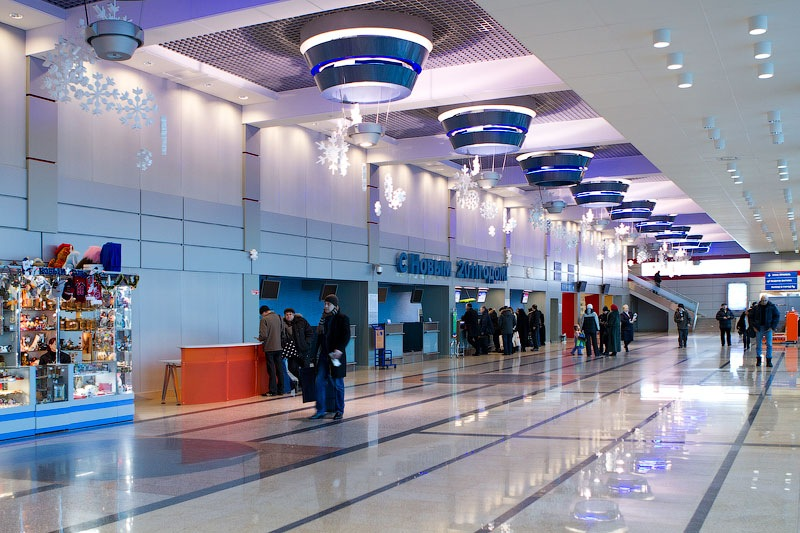
Inside Omsk Airport main terminal.

Airlines	Destinations
Aeroflot	Moscow–Sheremetyevo
Azimuth	Mineralnye Vody, Ufa
Azur Air	Seasonal charter: Phuket
Centrum Air	Tashkent
Ikar	Sochi
Nordstar Airlines	Krasnodar
Nordwind Airlines	Kazan, Saint Petersburg, Sochi
Pobeda	Moscow–Sheremetyevo, Moscow–Vnukovo
Red Wings Airlines	Yekaterinburg; Seasonal: Ulan-Ude
Rossiya	Krasnoyarsk–International, Saint Petersburg
S7 Airlines	Irkutsk, Moscow–Domodedovo, Novosibirsk
Sky Vision Airlines	Seasonal charter: Sharm El Sheikh
Ural Airlines	Moscow–Domodedovo
Utair	Khanty-Mansiysk, Nizhnevartovsk, Surgut
UVT Aero	Kazan, Novosibirsk, Tobolsk, Ufa
Uzbekistan Airlines	Namangan
Vietjet Qazaqstan	Astana
Yamal Airlines	Nadym, Novy Urengoy, Noyabrsk, Salekhard

== Accidents and incidents ==
- On 11 October 1984, a Tupolev Tu-154B-1 operating as Aeroflot Flight 3352 crashed into maintenance vehicles occupying the runway at Omsk. 174 of the 179 people on board were killed, along with 4 of the maintenance crew. The ground controller on duty had allowed maintenance work to be done on the runway (against regulations) and promptly fallen asleep, while the pilots were unable to see the vehicles in time due to poor weather conditions. 178 people died in all, making this the Soviet Union's deadliest airplane crash until that date.
- 2001 Antonov An-70 Crash
- After Russian government critic Alexei Navalny fell ill on 20 August 2020 after being allegedly poisoned at the Tomsk airport before his flight to Moscow, the plane was diverted to Omsk.

== See also ==
- List of airports in Russia
- List of the busiest airports in the former USSR
