= I-Fly =

Russian airline

| IATA | ICAO | Call sign |
|---|---|---|
| F7 | RSY | RUSSIAN SKY |
- Founded: 2009; 17 years ago
- Hubs: Vnukovo International Airport
- Fleet size: 6
- Destinations: 33
- Headquarters: Moscow, Russia
- Key people: Kirill Romanovsky, CEO
- Employees: 586 (2025)
- Website: iflyltd.ru

I-Fly is a Russian wet lease airline, which used to operate as a charter airline on behalf of Russian tour operator Tez Tour until 2023. It is based in Moscow operating mainly out of Vnukovo International Airport.

Airline was established in 2009, founded and as of 2026 is majority owned by Alexander Burtin, who is also a co-founder and co-owner of the Tez Tour travel company.

It is currently banned from flying in the European Union airspace.

== Destinations ==
I-Fly destinations:

| Country | City | Airport | Notes | Refs |
|---|---|---|---|---|
| Austria | Salzburg | Salzburg Airport | Terminated | |
| Bulgaria | Burgas | Burgas Airport | Terminated | |
| China | Haikou | Haikou Meilan International Airport | Terminated | |
| China | Hangzhou | Hangzhou Xiaoshan International Airport | Terminated | |
| China | Jinan | Jinan Yaoqiang International Airport | Terminated | |
| China | Nanjing | Nanjing Lukou International Airport | Terminated | |
| China | Sanya | Sanya Phoenix International Airport | Terminated | |
| China | Shenyang | Shenyang Taoxian International Airport | Terminated | |
| China | Shenzhen | Shenzhen Bao'an International Airport | Terminated | |
| China | Taiyuan | Taiyuan Wusu International Airport | Terminated | |
| China | Tianjin | Tianjin Binhai International Airport | Terminated | |
| China | Wuhan | Wuhan Tianhe International Airport | Terminated | |
| China | Xi'an | Xi'an Xianyang International Airport | Terminated | |
| China | Zhengzhou | Zhengzhou Xinzheng International Airport | Terminated | |
| Cyprus | Larnaca | Larnaca International Airport | Terminated | |
| Dominican Republic | Punta Cana | Punta Cana International Airport | Terminated | |
| Greece | Heraklion | Heraklion International Airport | Terminated | |
| Iran | Isfahan | Isfahan International Airport | Terminated | |
| Iran | Tehran | Imam Khomeini International Airport | Terminated | |
| Italy | Cagliari | Cagliari Elmas Airport | Terminated | |
| Italy | Lamezia Terme | Lamezia Terme International Airport | Terminated | |
| Italy | Rimini | Federico Fellini International Airport | Terminated | |
| Italy | Turin | Turin Airport | Terminated | |
| Italy | Verona | Verona Villafranca Airport | Terminated | |
| Montenegro | Podgorica | Podgorica Airport | Terminated | |
| Montenegro | Tivat | Tivat Airport | Terminated | |
| Russia | Blagoveshchensk | Ignatyevo Airport | | |
| Russia | Chita | Kadala Airport | | |
| Russia | Kaliningrad | Khrabrovo Airport | Terminated | |
| Russia | Moscow | Vnukovo International Airport | Hub | |
| Russia | Novosibirsk | Tolmachevo Airport | | |
| Russia | Omsk | Omsk Tsentralny Airport | | |
| Russia | Sochi | Adler-Sochi International Airport | Terminated | |
| Russia | Yakutsk | Yakutsk Airport | | |
| Spain | Barcelona | Barcelona–El Prat Airport | Terminated | |
| Spain | Tenerife | Tenerife South Airport | Terminated | |
| Thailand | Bangkok | Suvarnabhumi Airport | Terminated | |
| Thailand | Phuket | Phuket International Airport | Terminated | |
| Turkey | Antalya | Antalya Airport | Terminated | |
| Turkey | Bodrum | Milas–Bodrum Airport | Terminated | |
| United Arab Emirates | Dubai | Al Maktoum International Airport | Terminated | |

== Fleet ==
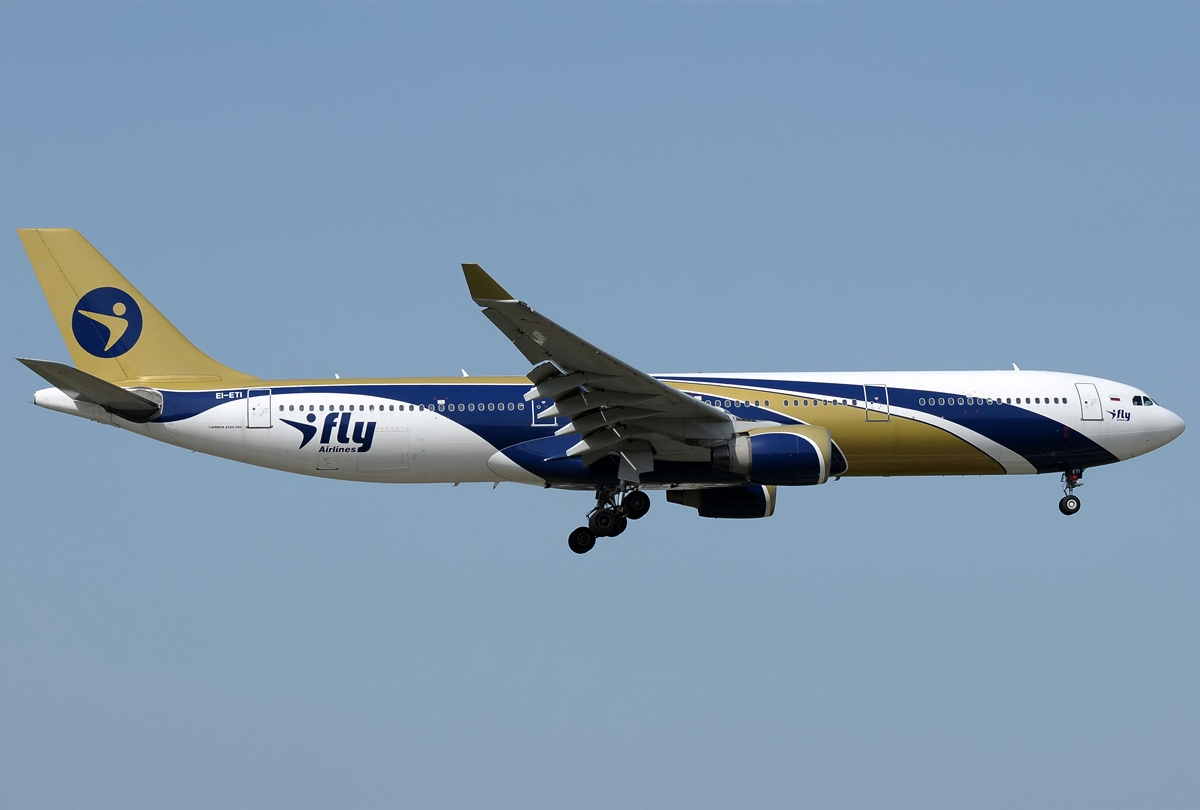
I-Fly Airbus A330-300

As of August 2025, I-Fly operates the following aircraft:

I-Fly fleet
| Aircraft | In service | Orders | Passengers | Notes |
|---|---|---|---|---|
| Airbus A330-200 | 3 | — | | |
| Airbus A330-300 | 3 | — | | |
| Total | 6 | — | | |

Air Lease Corporation are seeking to recover four Airbus A330s, as the lease payments are not being made.

The airline fleet previously included the following aircraft:

- 2 Airbus A319-100
- 1 Boeing 757-200 (as of November 2015)
