= Farman Salmanov Surgut Airport =

Airport in Khanty-Mansi Autonomous Okrug, Russia

Farman Salmanov Surgut Airport Аэропорт Сургут имени Фармана Салманова

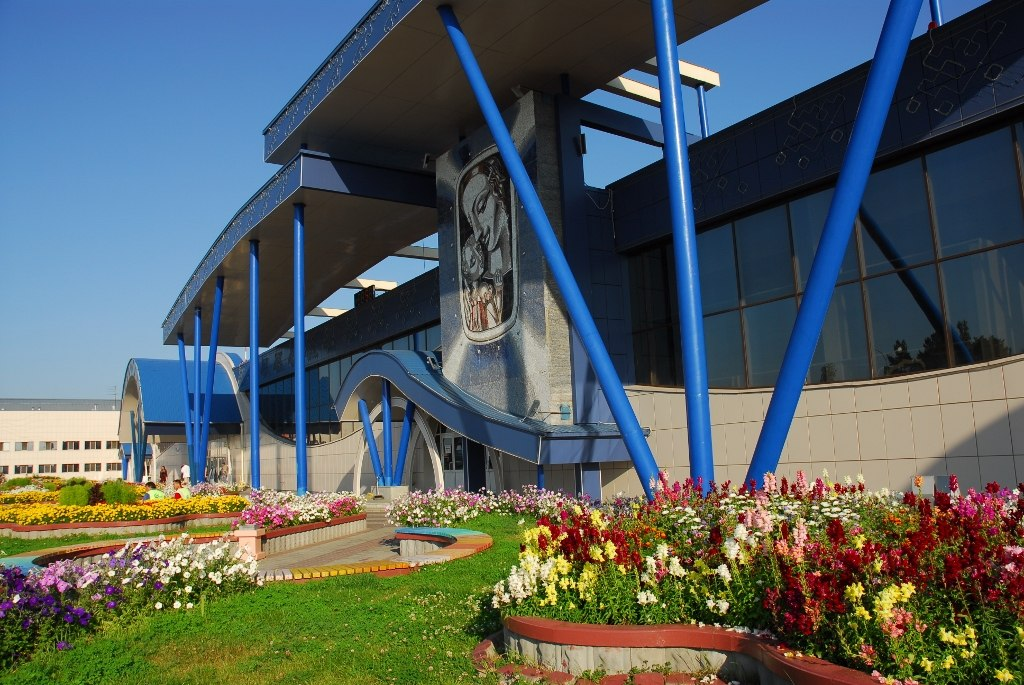
- IATA: SGC; ICAO: USRR

Summary
- Airport type: Public
- Serves: Surgut
- Location: Surgut, Russia
- Hub for: Utair
- Elevation AMSL: 200 ft (61 m)
- Coordinates: 61°20′36″N 73°24′12″E
- Website: www.airport-surgut.ru

Map
- Location of airport in Khanty-Mansi Autonomous Okrug

Runways
Direction	Length		Surface
Direction	m	ft	Surface
07/25	2,790	9,153	Asphalt

Statistics (2018)
- Passenger Traffic: ▲1,758,310
- Aircraft Traffic: ▲3,324
- Time Zone: UTC +5
- Source: DAFIF

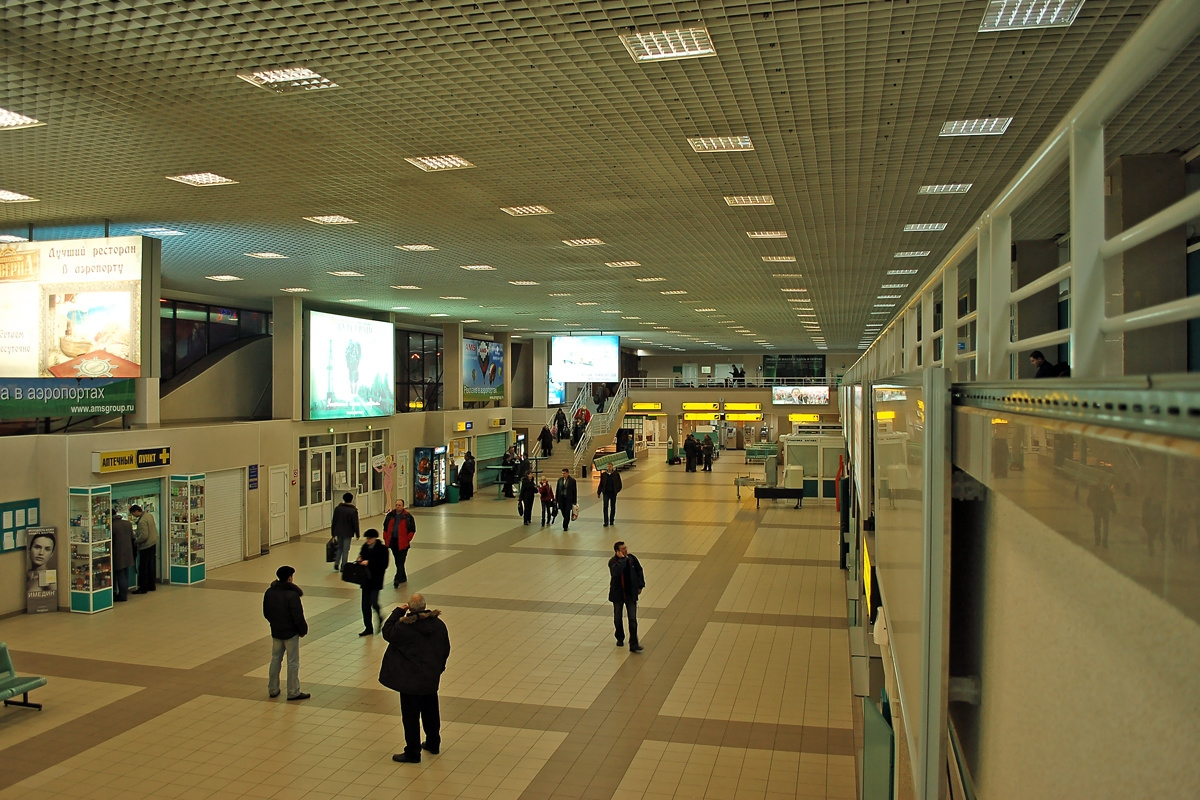
Inside the terminal of Surgut Airport

Farman Salmanov Surgut Airport (IATA: SGC, ICAO: USRR), also listed as Surgut North Airport, is an airport in Khanty-Mansi Autonomous Okrug, Russia, located 10 km (6 mi) north of Surgut. It services medium-sized airliners. In 2018, Surgut Airport handled 1,758,310 passengers. In May 2019, the airport was named after Farman Salmanov, a renowned Azerbaijani geologist.

== Characteristics ==
Surgut International Airport has a runway that can accommodate modern aircraft, such as the Boeing-737, Boeing 757, Boeing 767, Airbus A319, Airbus A320, Airbus A321, Airbus A330, as well as helicopters of all types.

The airport's capacity is 660 passengers per hour for domestic flights and 200 passengers per hour for international flights.

In the terminal building, there are VIP lounges as well as shops, cafes, and pharmacies. Wi-Fi access is also provided.

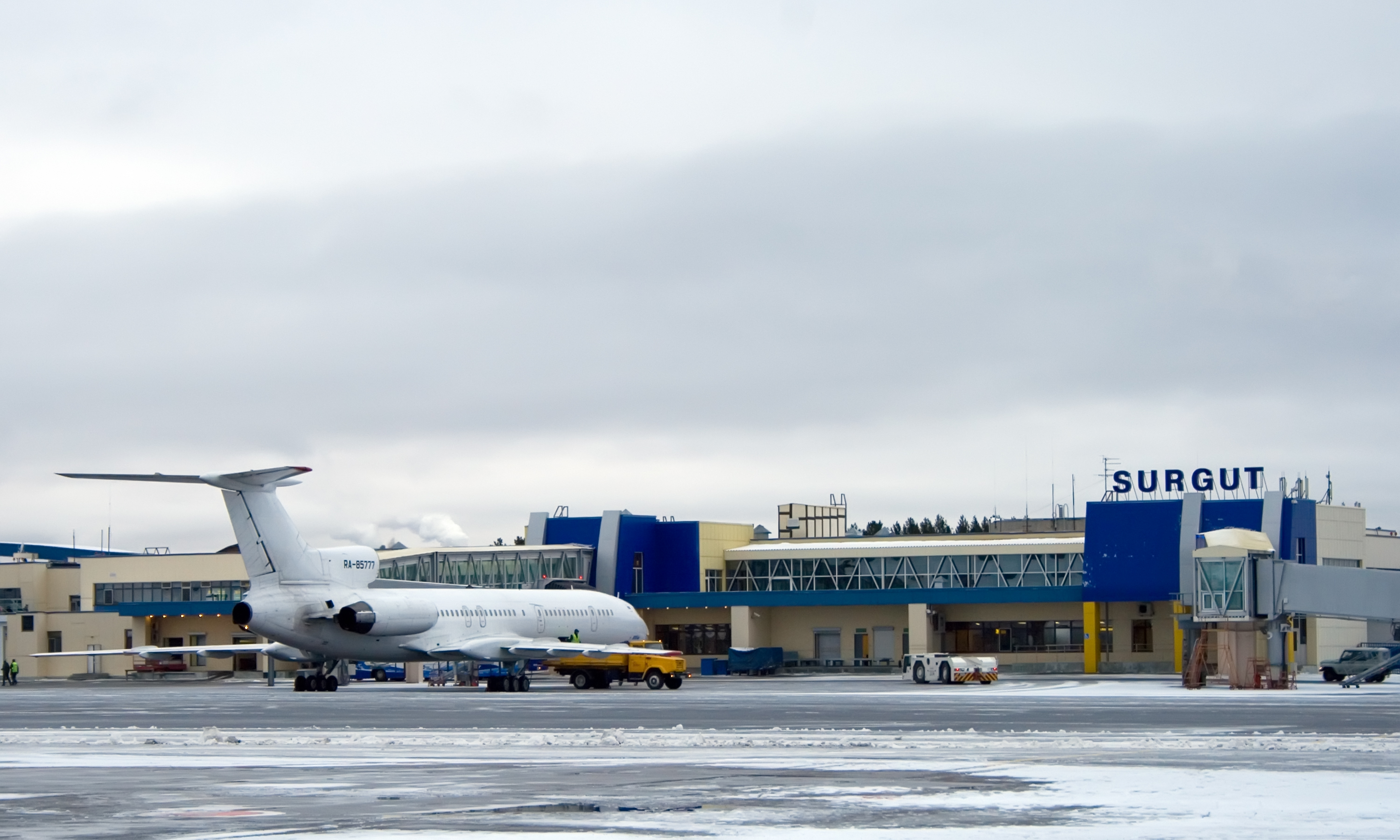
The main terminal of Surgut Airport

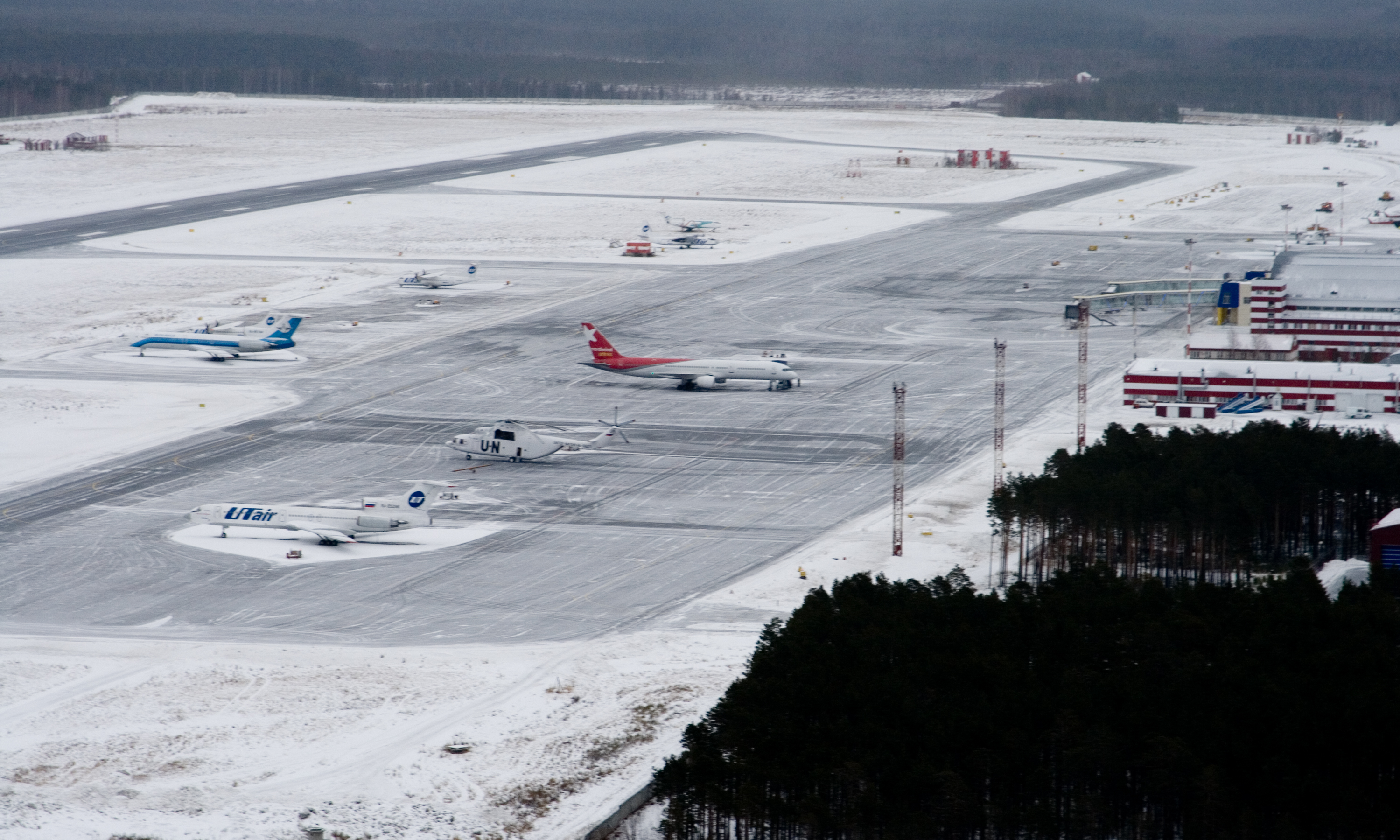
Aircraft parked at Surgut Airport

== History ==
=== 1931–2001 ===
In 1931, arrival of the first aircraft to the village of Surgut.

In 1937, the first building of the Surgut airport was built and put into operation.

In 1964, Surgut United Air Squadron was established.

In 1970, the State Commission commissioned the runway of the new city airport.

In 1972, first regular flight Surgut-Moscow performed by Tupolev Tu-134 airplane.

In 1975, commissioning of a new terminal building at the Surgut airport.

In 1979, installation, on the facade of the terminal, a mosaic panel - to a woman with a child in the window of the porthole "Surgut Madonna".

In 1998, Airport Surgut was awarded a certificate of honor as the result of the contest "The Best Airport in 1998 in CIS countries".

In 2000, Airport Surgut is recognized as the winner in the contest "The best airport of the year of the CIS countries" in the nomination "Intensively developing airport".

=== 2001–present ===
In 2001, Surgut Airport is open for international flights. The first flight was made by the airline "Utair" UT 777 - Kyiv (Boryspil).

In 2003, overhaul of the runway.

In 2004, full commissioning of the airport complex of the Surgut airport.

In 2007, opening of the telescopic ladder "Thyssen Krupp Airport Systems", putting into operation an automated vehicle access control system to the station square.

In 2008, Surgut airport for the first time congratulated the millionth passenger serviced during the year.

In 2009, creation and beginning of production activity of branches. Formed five branches: Berezovsky, Cape Kamensky, Noyabrsk, Tazovsky, Nefteyugansk.

In 2011, the hall of the waiting area for passengers of the international sector was built and put into operation. The duty-free shop "Duty-Free" opened in the international sector of the terminal.

In 2012, Airport Surgut started servicing domestic and international long-haul wide-body aircraft such as the Boeing 767-200 and the Boeing 767-300.

According to the results of work in 2015, the passenger traffic of Surgut Airport (including branches of the company) amounted to 1,976,389 people, exceeding the total of 2014 by 3.8%.

== Airlines and destinations ==
Airlines	Destinations
Aeroflot	Moscow–Sheremetyevo
Aero Nomad Airlines	Bishkek, Osh
Azimuth	Cheboksary, Mineralnye Vody
Azur Air	Seasonal charter: Antalya, Phuket
Ikar	Kazan; Seasonal: Sochi
Nordwind Airlines	Seasonal: Makhachkala, Sochi
Pobeda	Kazan, Makhachkala
Red Wings Airlines	Nizhnekamsk, Volgograd, Yekaterinburg
Rossiya Airlines	Krasnoyarsk–International, Saint Petersburg
S7 Airlines	Novosibirsk
Somon Air	Khujand
Utair	Baku, Barnaul, Beloyarsk, Bishkek, Chelyabinsk, Dubai–Al Maktoum, Fergana, Gorno-Altaysk, Grozny, Khujand, Krasnodar, Mineralnye Vody, Moscow–Vnukovo, Novosibirsk, Omsk, Perm, Saint Petersburg, Samara, Sochi, Stavropol, Tashkent, Tomsk, Tyumen, Ufa, Uray, Yekaterinburg, Yerevan; Seasonal: Antalya, Gelendzik, Kurgan, Volgograd
UVT Aero	Bugulma, Kazan

== Statistics ==
Busiest airlines operating in Surgut International Airport (by number of passengers) 2024
Rank	Airline	Country	Number of passengers	Share of Total
1	Utair	Russia	1,336,101	60.2%
2	Aeroflot	Russia	291,769	13.1%
3	Pobeda	Russia	221,263	10.0%

Busiest domestic routes at Surgut International Airport (by number of passengers) 2015
Rank	City	Region	Airports	Airlines	Number of passengers
1	Moscow	Moscow; Moscow Oblast	Sheremetyevo, Vnukovo	Aeroflot, Pobeda, Utair	525,461
2	St Petersburg	(Saint Petersburg) St Petersburg; Leningrad Oblast	Pulkovo	Utair	96,626
3	Ufa	Bashkortostan	Ufa International Airport	S7 Airlines, UTair Aviation, Yamal Airlines	90,470
4	Samara	Samara Oblast	Kurumoch	S7 Airlines, Utair	63,688
5	Tyumen	Tyumen Oblast	Roshchino	Utair	48,453

Busiest CIS routes at Surgut International Airport (by number of passengers) 2015
Rank	City	Country	Airports	Airlines	Number of passengers
1	Khujand	Tajikistan	Khujand Airport	Tajik Air, Utair	26,973
2	Bishkek	Kyrgyzstan	Manas	Air Bishkek, Avia Traffic Company	25,145
3	Osh	Kyrgyzstan	Osh Airport	Avia Traffic Company	22,396
4	Baku	Azerbaijan	Heydar Aliyev International Airport	Utair	11,030
5	Kyiv	Ukraine	Boryspil International Airport	Utair	2,669

Busiest international routes at Surgut International Airport (by number of passengers) 2015
Rank	City	Country	Airports	Airlines	Number of passengers
1	Antalya	Turkey	Antalya Airport	Pegas Fly	32,095
2	Hurghada	Egypt	Hurghada International Airport	Pegas Fly	17,800
3	Cam Ranh	Vietnam	Cam Ranh International Airport	Pegas Fly	12,221
5	Sharm el-Sheikh	Egypt	Sharm el-Sheikh International Airport	Pegas Fly	8,623
5	Phuket	Thailand	Phuket Airport	Nordwind Airlines	6,101

== Accidents and incidents ==
On 1 January 2011, Kolavia Flight 348 suffered an explosion and fire at Surgut. The aircraft was taxiing before departing Surgut on a flight to Domodedovo International Airport, Moscow when the fire started and quickly engulfed the entire plane, which then burned to the ground. Despite a quick evacuation, 3 persons were killed.

== See also ==
- List of the busiest airports in Russia
- List of the busiest airports in the former USSR
