= Pobedilovo Airport =

Airport in Kirov, Russia

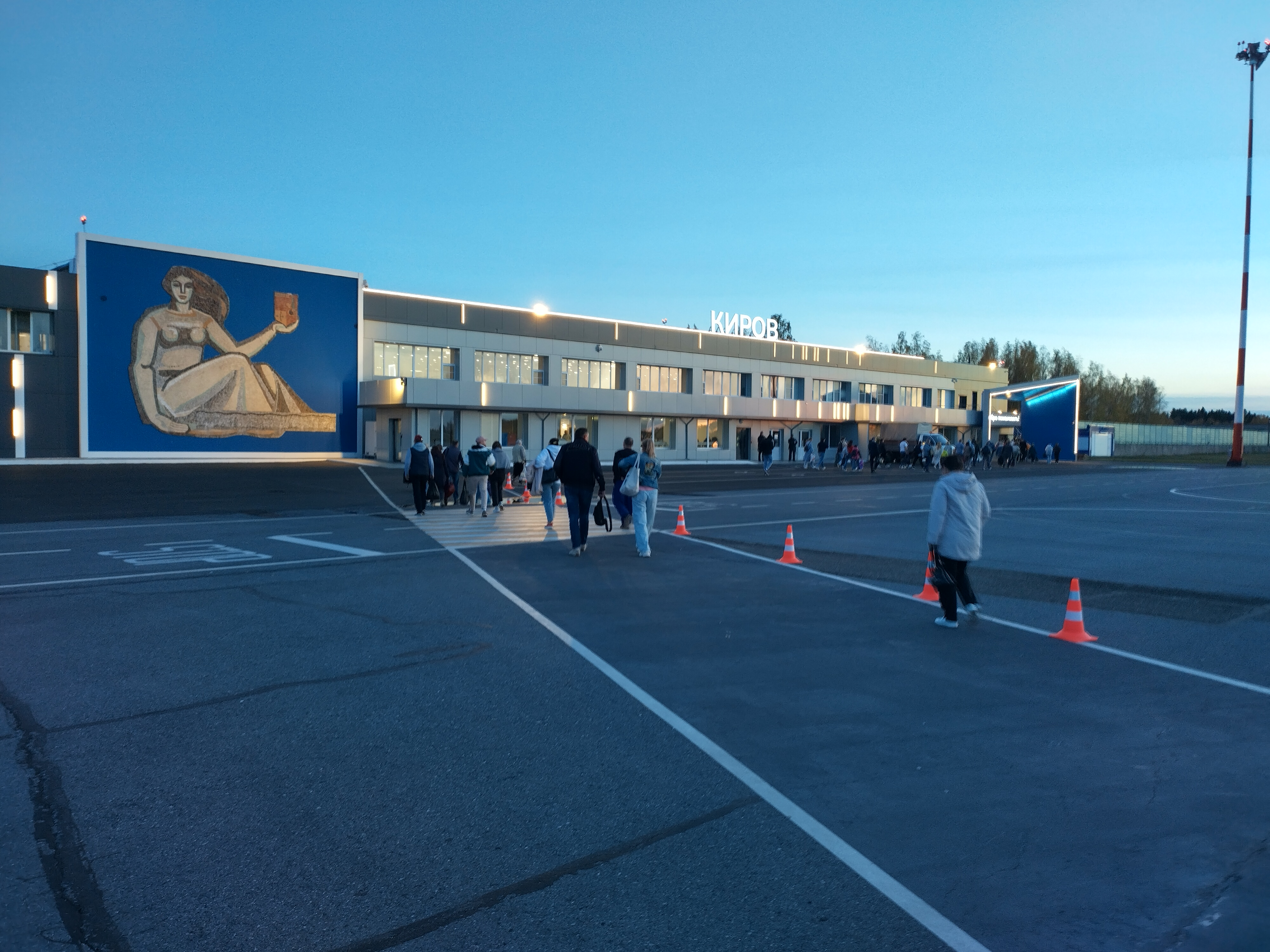
- IATA: KVX; ICAO: USKK

Summary
- Airport type: Public
- Owner: Government of Kirov Oblast
- Operator: JSC «Aeroport Pobedilovo»
- Serves: Kirov
- Location: Kirov, Russia
- Elevation AMSL: 486 ft (148 m)
- Coordinates: 58°30′12″N 49°20′54″E
- Website: pobedilovo43.ru

Map
- Location of airport in Kirov Oblast

Runways
Direction	Length		Surface
Direction	ft	m	Surface
03/21	8,868	2,703	Asphalt
06/24	2,217	675	Asphalt

Statistics (2024)
- Passengers: 490,175
- Time zone: UTC +3

Pobedilovo Airport (Russian: Аэропорт Победилово) (IATA: KVX, ICAO: USKK) is an airport in Russia located 22 km southwest of Kirov. It serves regional flights in Russia. It has the status of a federal airport of significance.

== History ==
The airfield in Pobedilovo was established in 1941 and was used as a military reserve. In 1964, this site was deemed suitable for the construction of a new civilian airport.

In 1969, the existing Pobedilovo Airport was built. The airport got its name from the village near which it is located.

In the 90s, the state of local aviation deteriorated significantly, as a result of a significant increase in prices. This was the reason for the termination of flights on local passenger airlines in 1992, and intercity communication was also under threat. In the mid-2000s, regular flights to Moscow and St. Petersburg, Anapa, Sochi, and Simferopol resumed.

In 2006, the reconstruction of the runway to Class B began. In 2013, all work on the reconstruction of the runway was completed. After the technical flight in 2014, the strip was put into operation.

On the eve of the 650th anniversary of the Kirov, a large-scale reconstruction of the airport began in 2023. It is planned to upgrade the premises, the facade of the building, and increase parking spaces. The recreation area will also be increased, another inspection point will be opened, a mother and child room, toilets, and a cafe. The second floor of the airport, which has been mothballed for a long time, will be opened. The construction of the second terminal is planned.

== Airlines and destinations ==
Airlines	Destinations
azimuth	Mineralnye Vody
Ikar	Seasonal: Kaliningrad, Makahchkala, Sochi
Nordwind Airlines	Seasonal: Sochi
Pobeda	Moscow–Sheremetyevo, Saint Petersburg; Seasonal: Sochi
RusLine	Naryan-Mar
UVT Aero	Kazan

== Statistics ==
=== Passenger statistics ===
Annual passenger traffic
Year	Passengers	% change
2014	74,16	5.2%
2015	124,5	▲67.8%
2016	198,3	▲59.2%
2017	166,2	▼16.1%
2018	128,3	▼22.8%
2019	240,8	▲87.6%
2020	209,2	▼13.1%
2021	336,6	▲60.8%
2022	374	▲11.1%
2023	426,6	▲14%
2024	490,1	▲14.8%

== Transport links with Kirov ==
Regular passenger transportation between Kirov and the airport is carried out by buses No. 116. The route operates at half-hour intervals from 05:55 to 20:20. The fare is 30 rubles. The travel time is from 40 minutes. The bus also stops near Kirov Train Station.

== Gallery ==
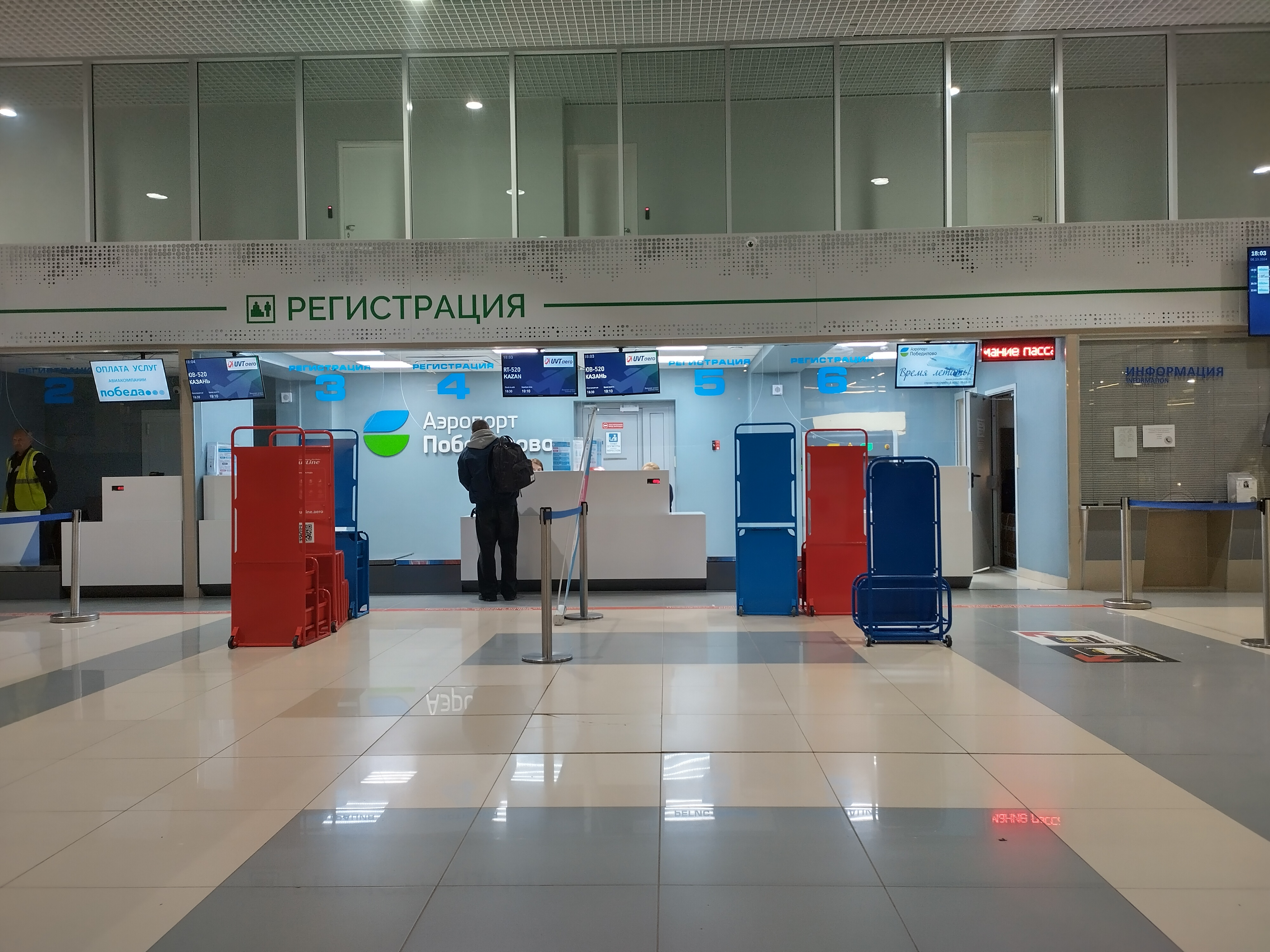

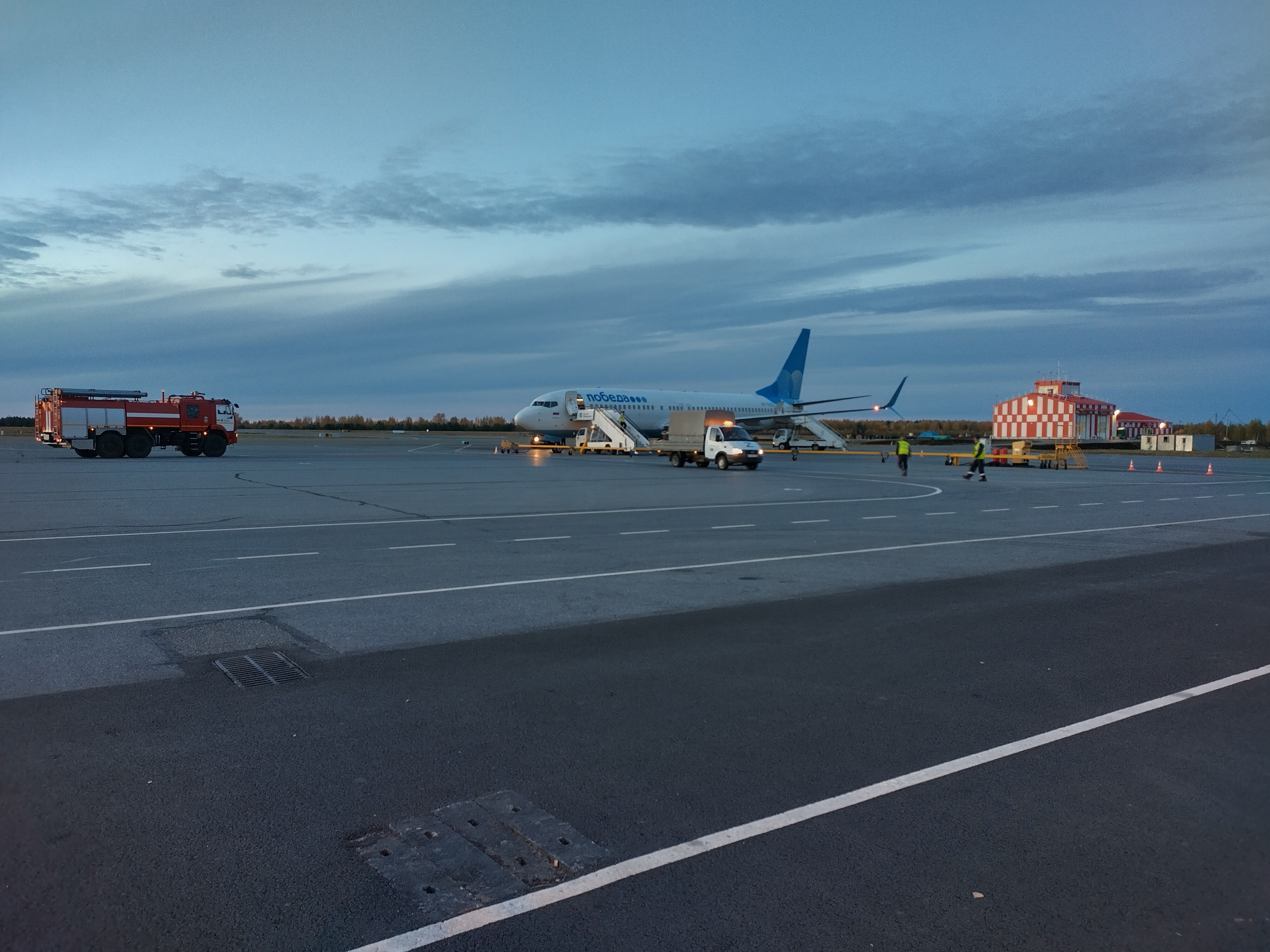

== See also ==
- List of airports in Russia
