= Stavropol Higher Military Aviation School of Pilots and Navigators PVO =

The Stavropol Higher Military Aviation School of Pilots and Navigators of the Air Defence Forces (Note: Russian: Ставропольское высшее военно-авиационное училище лётчиков и штурманов, romanized: Stavropolskoye vyssheye voyenno-aviatsionnoye uchilishche lyotchikov i shturmanov) was an aviation school located in the city of Stavropol (at Stavropol Shpakovskoye Airport), which trained flight personnel (pilots and navigators) for the Soviet Air Defence Forces and Air Forces.

The school was formed on 1 November 1969, Created on and controlled four training aviation regiments (at Salsk, Khankala, Tikhoretsk, and Kholodnogorsk). A directive was issued on September 15, 1969 on the basis of orders of the Minister of Defence of the USSR No. 0022 and No. 080 of 1969 and directive of the General Staff of the Armed Forces of the USSR No. org / 8/87704 of July 18, 1969 on the basis of the branch of the Armavir Higher Military Aviation School of Air Defence located in Stavropol.

In 1993 the school was renamed the Stavropol Higher Aviation Engineering Institute, with schools at Stavropol, Daugavpils and Lomonosov.

The directive of the Ministry of Defence of the Russian Federation dated July 1, 2010 ceased the existence of the Stavropol Higher Military Aviation Engineering School named after Air Marshal V.A. Sudets. Since 2011, the Presidential Cadet Corps of the North Caucasian Federal District has been located on its territory.
