= Mineralnye Vody Airport =

Airport in Stavropol Krai, Russia

- IATA: MRV; ICAO: URMM

Summary
- Airport type: Public
- Operator: Novaport
- Serves: Cherkessk, Kislovodsk, Mineralnye Vody, Pyatigorsk, Yessentuki
- Hub for: Rossiya azimuth
- Elevation AMSL: 321 m (1,053 ft)
- Coordinates: 44°13′30″N 043°04′55″E
- Website: mvairport.ru/

Map
- Location of the airport in Stavropol Krai Location of the airport in Russia Location of the airport in Europe

Runways
Direction	Length		Surface
Direction	m	ft	Surface
12/30	3,900	12,795	Concrete

Statistics (2018)
- Passengers: 2 408 000
- Sources: Russian Federal Air Transport Agency (see also provisional 2018 statistics)

Mineralnye Vody Airport (Russian: Аэропорт Минеральные Воды) (IATA: MRV, ICAO: URMM) (also written as Mineralnyye Vody Airport, which "Mineralnye Vody" literally translates to Mineral Waters) is an airport in Stavropol Krai, Russia, located 4 kilometres (2.5 mi) west of Mineralnye Vody. It features a civilian terminal area on its west side with 41 parking spots. The airfield houses a Tupolev Tu-154 maintenance facility on the east side.

== History ==
On 22 June 2014, Transaero Airlines began operating the Boeing 747-400 from Moscow. The airline operated the aircraft into the airport during the peak holiday seasons on Sundays, with the aircraft carrying a maximum of 522 passengers. To that date, the 747-400 is the largest aircraft to have operated into the airport.

In July 2016, Novaport bought the Mineralnye Vody Airport from Aeroinvest.

Mineralnye Vody has experienced rapid growth in recent years. It reached almost 5 million passengers in 2024, making it the 93rd busiest airport in Europe and the 9th busiest in Russia. On May 14, 2025, a new terminal with five airbridges was opened. It is intended solely for domestic flights, while the older terminal has since been dedicated exclusively to international operations.

== Airlines and destinations ==
Airlines	Destinations
Aeroflot	Antalya, Istanbul, Moscow–Sheremetyevo, Saint Petersburg, Yerevan
AlMasria Universal Airlines	Seasonal charter: Sharm El Sheikh
azimuth	Almaty, Antalya, Astrakhan, Batumi, Bukhara, Cheboksary, Chelyabinsk, Dubai–Al Maktoum, Istanbul, Ivanovo, Jeddah, Kaliningrad, Kaluga (suspended until 23 March 2027), Khanty-Mansiysk, Kirov, Magnitogorsk, Makhachkala, Minsk, Nizhnekamsk, Nizhnevartovsk, Omsk, Orenburg, Penza, Perm, Pskov, Samara, Samarqand, Saransk, Saratov, Sharm El Sheikh, Sochi, Surgut, Syktyvkar, Tashkent, Tbilisi, Tel Aviv, Tyumen, Ufa, Ulyanovsk-Barartayevka, Yaroslval, Yerevan
Azur Air	Seasonal charter: Antalya, Hambantota–Mattala, Phuket
Centrum Air	Tashkent
flydubai	Dubai–International
FlyOne	Tashkent
Ikar	Nizhny Novgorod, Orenburg
NordStar	Moscow–Domodedovo, Norilsk
Nordwind Airlines	Kazan, Nizhny Novgorod
Pobeda	Moscow–Sheremetyevo, Moscow–Vnukovo
Red Wings Airlines	Astana, Batumi, Istanbul, Tbilisi, Tel Aviv, Yerevan; Seasonal: Bodrum, Omsk, Ulan-Ude; Seasonal charter: Hurghada, Sharm El Sheikh
Rossiya	Krasnoyarsk–International, Moscow–Sheremetyevo, Saint Petersburg, Yekaterinburg
S7 Airlines	Moscow–Domodedovo, Novosibirsk
Severstal Air Company	Cherepovets, Petrozavodsk
Smartavia	Saint Petersburg
Southwind Airlines	Seasonal charter: Antalya
Ural Airlines	Dushanbe, Khujand, Moscow–Domodedovo, Osh, Yekaterinburg; Seasonal charter: Antalya, Sharm El Sheikh
Utair	Moscow–Vnukovo, Noyabrsk, Surgut, Tyumen; Seasonal: Ufa
Uzbekistan Airways	Tashkent
Yakutia Airlines	Moscow–Vnukovo, Yakutsk
Yamal Airlines	Novy Urengoy, Salekhard, Tyumen; Seasonal: Noyabrsk

== Statistics ==
=== Annual traffic ===
Annual passenger traffic
Year	Passengers	% change
2010	888,000	Steady
2011	966,562	▲8.8%
2012	1,279,539	▲32.4%
2013	1,473,446	▲15.2%
2014	1,921,669	▲30.4%
2015	1,966,492	▲2.3%
2016	1,731,558	▼11.9%
2017	2,180,178	▲25.9%

== Accidents and incidents ==
- On 21 October 1953, Aeroflot Flight 525, a Lisunov Li-2, crashed in bad weather.
- On 31 December 1961, an Aeroflot-Armenia Il-18V crashed while attempting a go-around during a charter flight, killing 32 of 119 on board. The aircraft was one of two sent to pick up people who had been stranded at Tbilisi due to bad weather.
- On 27 February 1972, an Aeroflot Antonov 24B lost control and crashed on approach, after an unintentional application of the thrust reversers.
- On 15 February 1977, Aeroflot Flight 5003 crashed during the initial climb phase of the flight, killing 77 of the 98 people aboard the aircraft.

== See also ==
- List of the busiest airports in Russia
- List of the busiest airports in Europe
- List of the busiest airports in the former USSR
