= Nadym Airport =

Airport in Yamalia, Russia

- IATA: NYM; ICAO: USMM

Summary
- Airport type: Public
- Serves: Nadym, Yamalo-Nenets Autonomous Okrug, Russia
- Elevation AMSL: 15 m / 49 ft
- Coordinates: 65°28′48″N 72°42′12″E
- Website: www.avianadym.ru

Maps
- Yamalo-Nenets Autonomous Okrug in Russia

- Location of the airport in Yamalo-Nenets

Runways
Direction	Length		Surface
Direction	m	ft	Surface
14/32	2,548	8,360	Concrete
- Sources: GCM, STV

Nadym Airport (IATA: NYM, ICAO: USMM) is an airport in Yamalo-Nenets Autonomous Okrug, Russia, located 9 km (5.6 mi) southeast of Nadym. It handles large airliners (including Ilyushin Il-62 and Ilyushin Il-86 aircraft). 186,769 passengers traveled to and from this airport in 2018.

== Airlines and destinations ==
Airlines	Destinations
Gazpromavia	Charter: Moscow–Vnukovo, Sovetsky
S7 Airlines	Moscow–Domodedovo, Novosibirsk
Yamal Airlines	Moscow–Domodedovo, Omsk, Saint Petersburg, Tyumen, Ufa, Yekaterinburg; Seasonal: Mineralnye Vody, Sochi

== See also ==
- List of airports in Russia
