= Sky Vision Airlines =

Egyptian private airline

IATA	ICAO	Call sign
SE	SVI	—
- Founded: 18 December 2022
- Focus cities: Sharm El Sheikh
- Fleet size: 7
- Website: skyvisionairline.com

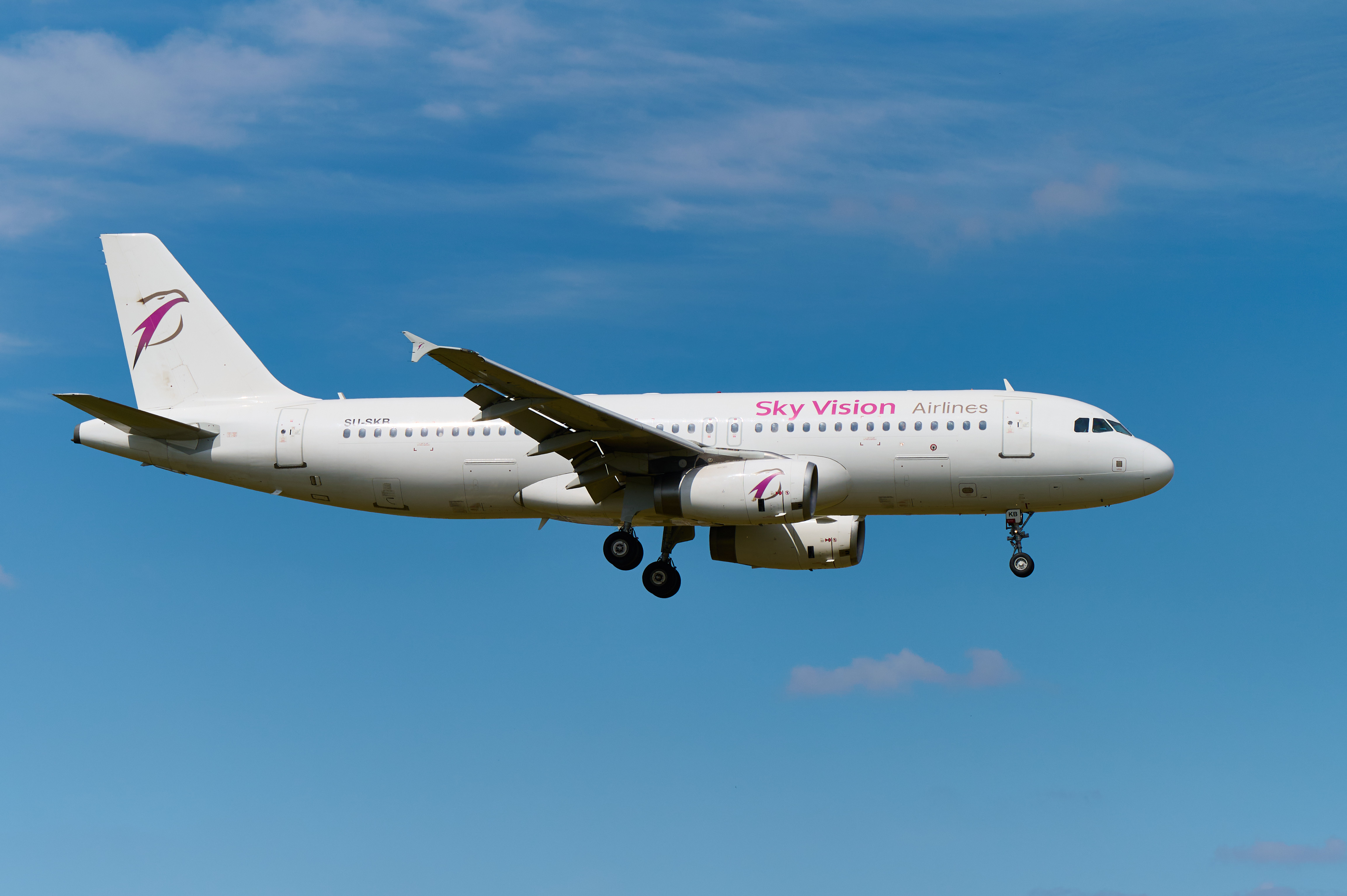
A Sky Vision Airlines Airbus A320

Sky Vision Airlines is an Egyptian private airline headquartered in Cairo, Egypt. Sky Vision Airlines was established in Egypt in 2022 and operated its inaugural commercial service on 2 January 2023, operating from Sharm El Sheikh to Cairo. The airline operates scheduled and charter flights from Egypt. It plans to focus on the charter market in Africa, Middle East and Europe, and in the long run, has plans to add widebody aircraft - most likely Airbus A330 - to serve destinations further afield in Asia.

== Destinations ==
The Sky Vision Airlines route network consists of the following destinations:

Country	City	Airport	Notes	Refs
Egypt	Cairo	Cairo International Airport		
Egypt	Hurghada	Hurghada International Airport		
Egypt	Sharm El Sheikh	Sharm El Sheikh International Airport		
Russia	Kazan	Ğabdulla Tuqay Kazan International Airport		
Russia	Moscow	Alexander S. Pushkin Sheremetyevo International Airport		
Russia	Omsk	Omsk Central Airport		
Russia	Perm	Bolshoye Savino Airport		
Russia	Saint Petersburg	Pulkovo Airport		
Russia	Tyumen	Roshchino Airport		
Russia	Ufa	Mustai Karim Ufa International Airport		
Russia	Yekaterinburg	Koltsovo Airport		

== Fleet ==
=== Current fleet ===
As of July 2026, Sky Vision Airlines operates the following aircraft:

Sky Vision Airlines fleet
Aircraft	In service	Orders	Notes
Airbus A320	3		
Airbus A320P2F	1		
Airbus A321	1		
Airbus A321P2F	2		
Total	7		

=== Former fleet ===
As of August 2025, Sky Vision Airlines operated 3 Airbus A320, 1 Airbus A320P2F and 2 Airbus A321P2F.
