= Ufa International Airport =

Airport in Russia

Mostay Kərim Ufa International Airport Мостай Кәрим Өфө халыҡ-ара аэропорты (Bashkir)

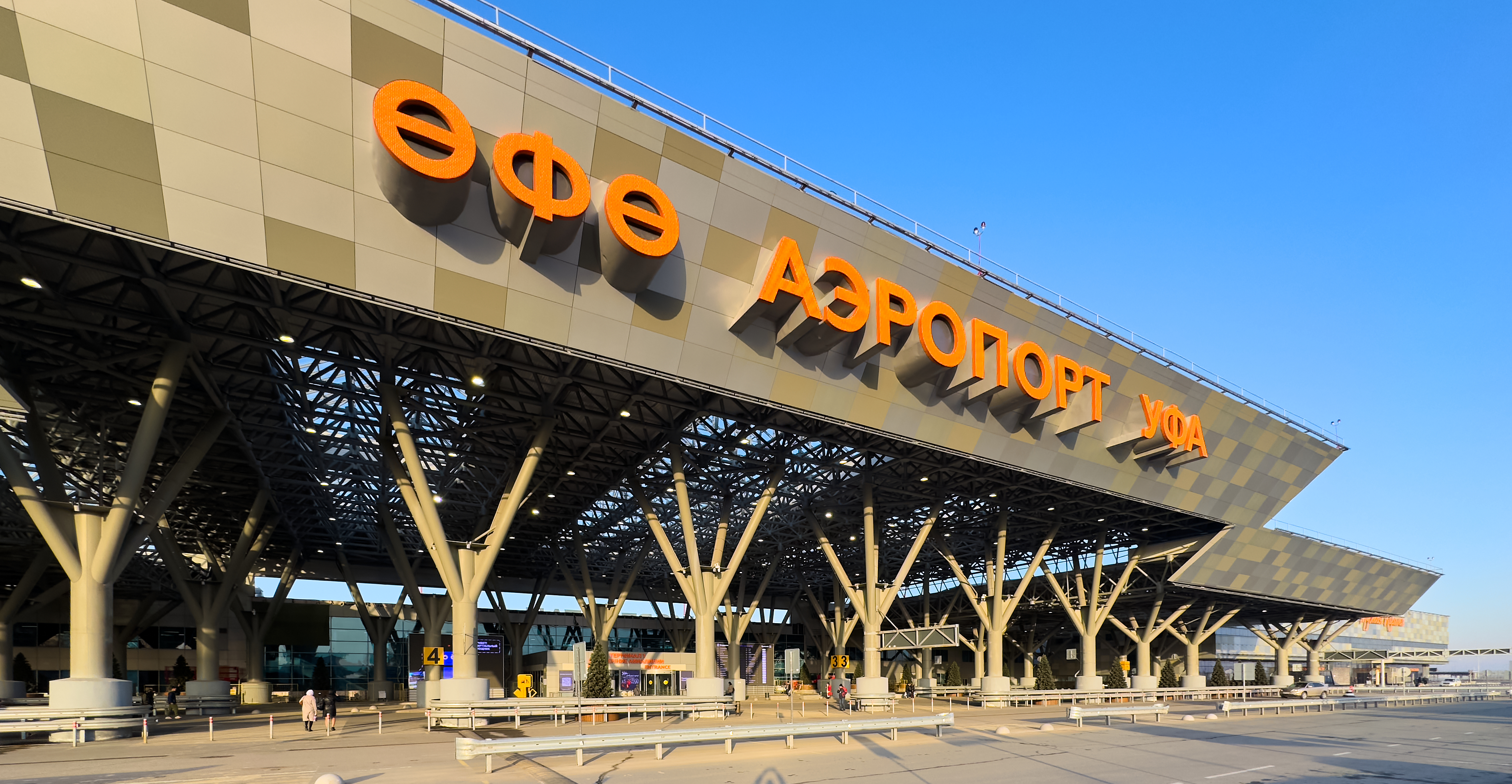
- IATA: UFA; ICAO: UWUU

Summary
- Airport type: Public
- Operator: JSC "International Airport "Ufa"
- Serves: Ufa, Bashkortostan, Russia
- Elevation AMSL: 137 m (449 ft)
- Coordinates: 54°33′49″N 55°52′49″E
- Website: www.airportufa.ru

Map
- Location of the airport in Bashkortostan Location of the airport in Russia Location of the airport in Europe

Runways
Direction	Length		Surface
Direction	m	ft	Surface
14R/32L	3,761	12,339	Concrete
14L/32R	2,513	8,245	Concrete

Statistics (2018, 2023)
- Passenger traffic: 3,222,825
- Passenger traffic: 4,794,786
- Sources: Russian Federal Air Transport Agency (see also provisional 2018 statistics)

Ufa International Airport (Russian: Международный аэропорт Уфа; Bashkir: Өфө халыҡ-ара аэропорты, romanized: Öfö xalıq-ara aeroportı; IATA: UFA, ICAO: UWUU) is the primary airport serving Ufa, Bashkortostan, Russia.

In 2025, the airport handled 4,929,715 passengers, becoming tenth largest airport in Russia, the 2nd busiest airport in Volga Federal District (after Ğabdulla Tuqay Kazan International Airport), 18th-busiest in Post-Soviet states as well as one of the Top-100 busiest airports in Europe.

Former BAL Bashkirian Airlines used to be headquartered at the airport.

== History ==
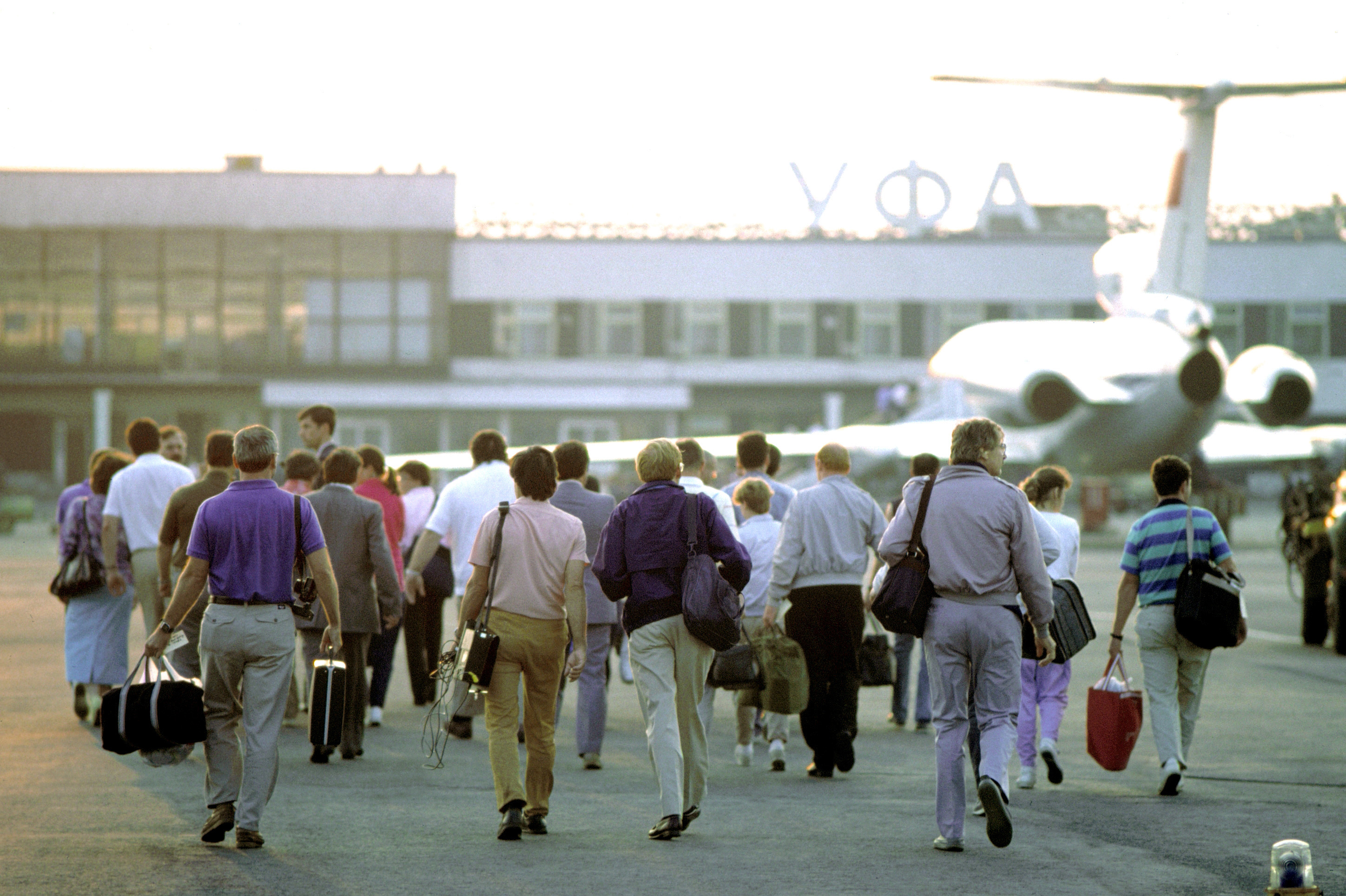
Ufa International Airport in 1989

On 11 May 1924, the building of the first aircraft hangar near Glumilino village was completed. On 15 May, a new aviation club opened within the Bashkirian branch of AFFVS.

In 1933, the first ever route opened, encompassing over 730 km via Ufa–Sterlitamak–Meleuz–Mrakovo–Baymak–Magnitogorsk–Beloretsk–Ufa.

In 1956, Ufa Airport began performing technical maintenance of the Yakovlev Yak-12 airplanes and Mil Mi-1 helicopters, which were then serving the Bashkirian air routes.

Between 1959 and 1962, the airport was under reconstruction, and three hotel buildings, cargo and fuel storage facilities, a 100-seat dining hall and a garage were built. A new runway was built, as well as radio approach equipment for landing under heavy weather conditions and new radar facilities. The new runway was then capable of receiving Tupolev Tu-124, Antonov An-10 and Ilyushin Il-18 aircraft.

In 1964, a new terminal for 400 passengers per hour was built and put in operation. In 1986 the Tu-134 hijacking attempt occurred at the airport.

In 2007, the reconstructed terminal of the airport entered into operation. The area of the air terminal has more than doubled. Many departments are located there. Four telescopic ramps, four elevators and three escalators have been installed. It can serve 600 passengers per hour.

== Airlines and destinations ==
The following airlines operate regular scheduled, seasonal, and seasonal charter flights to and from Ufa:

Airlines	Destinations
Aeroflot	Krasnodar, Moscow–Sheremetyevo, Sanya, Sochi
Air Arabia	Sharjah (suspended until 27 March 2027)
Air Cairo	Seasonal charter: Sharm El Sheikh
AlMasria Universal Airlines	Seasonal charter: Sharm El Sheikh
Armenian Airlines	Yerevan (suspended)
Azimuth	Astrakhan, Krasnoyarsk–International, Mineralnye Vody, Omsk, Samarqand, Saratov, Tbilisi, Yerevan
Azur Air	Seasonal charter: Hambantota–Mattala, Hurghada, Nha Trang, Pattaya, Phuket, Sharm El Sheikh
Belavia	Minsk
Centrum Air	Tashkent
Corendon Airlines	Seasonal charter: Antalya
flydubai	Dubai–International
Gazpromavia	Charter: Bovanenkovo, Moscow–Vnukovo, Nadym, Novy Urengoy, Yamburg
Ikar	Kazan, Nizhny Novgorod, Sochi
IrAero	Seasonal: Sochi
NordStar	Moscow–Domodedovo, Norilsk
Nordwind Airlines	Dushanbe, Kaliningrad, Khujand, Makhachkala, Saint Petersburg, Sochi; Seasonal charter: Phuket
Pobeda	Dubai-Al Maktoum, Istanbul, Moscow–Sheremetyevo, Moscow–Vnukovo, Saint Petersburg, Sochi
Red Wings Airlines	Istanbul, Minsk, Yekaterinburg
Rossiya Airlines	Saint Petersburg; Seasonal charter: Hurghada, Sharm El Sheikh
RusLine	Naryan-Mar
S7 Airlines	Irkutsk, Moscow–Domodedovo, Novosibirsk
SCAT Airlines	Seasonal charter: Aqtau
Shirak Avia	Yerevan
Sky Vision Airlines	Seasonal charter: Sharm El Sheikh
Smartavia	Saint Petersburg; Seasonal: Sochi
Southwind Airlines	Seasonal charter: Antalya
Ural Airlines	Dushanbe, Nizhnevartovsk, Yekaterinburg
Utair	Chelyabinsk, Dubai–Al Maktoum, Igarka, Kazan, Khanty-Mansiysk, Kogalym, Krasnodar, Moscow–Vnukovo, Naryan-Mar, Nizhnevartovsk, Novy Urengoy, Samara, Surgut, Talakan, Tashkent, Tyumen, Yekaterinburg; Seasonal: Gelendzhik, Istanbul, Mineralnye Vody, Sochi
UVT Aero	Usinsk
Uzbekistan Airways	Namangan, Tashkent
VietJet Air	Seasonal charter: Nha Trang
Yamal Airlines	Nadym, Novy Urengoy, Noyabrsk, Salekhard

== Statistics ==
=== Annual traffic ===
Annual passenger traffic
Year	Passengers	% change
2010	1,501,000	Steady
2011	1,688,570	▲11.6%
2012	1,918,945	▲13.6%
2013	2,218,000	▲15.6%
2014	2,380,581	▲7.3%
2015	2,313,388	▼2.8%
2016	2,318,434	▲0.2%
2017	2,814,330	▲21.4%

== Ground transportation ==
The city bus lines No. 101 and 110 and 110c connect the airport with the city of Ufa.

== See also ==
- List of the busiest airports in Russia
- List of the busiest airports in Europe
- List of the busiest airports in the former USSR
