= Sochi International Airport =

Airport in Russia

Sochi International Airport Международный Аэропорт Сочи

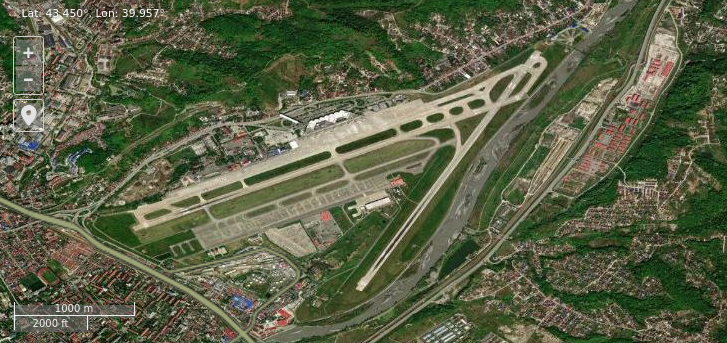
- Satellite imagery of Sochi International Airport
- IATA: AER; ICAO: URSS

Summary
- Airport type: Public / Military
- Owner: Oleg Deripaska through Basic Element
- Operator: Sochi International Airport, JSC
- Serves: Sochi, Krasnodar Krai, Russia
- Elevation AMSL: 27 m (89 ft)
- Coordinates: 43°27′00″N 39°57′24″E
- Website: aer.aero

Map
- Location of the airport in Krasnodar Krai Location of the airport in Russia Location of the airport in Europe

Runways
Direction	Length		Surface
Direction	m	ft	Surface
02/20	2,600	7,218	Asphalt
06/24	3,000	9,482	Asphalt

Statistics (2024)
- Passenger Traffic: 13,725,979 ▼1.3%
- Aircraft Traffic: 44,038

Sochi International Airport (Russian: Международный Аэропорт Сочи; IATA: AER, ICAO: URSS) is an international airport located in the Adler District of the resort city of Sochi, on the coast of the Black Sea in the federal subject of Krasnodar Krai, Russia. Sochi International Airport is among the ten largest Russian airports, with an annual passenger turnover of 5.2 million.

The airport is run by an international joint venture of Basic Element group, Sberbank and Changi Airports International. The airport has been recognized as the best regional airport at the 3rd annual forum "Development of Russia and CIS airports – 2013", held by Adam Smith Conference. Sochi International Airport was the main gateway during the 2014 Winter Olympics. It served over 350,000 passengers on February 1–28, 2014. Over 2,800 tons of luggage was handled during the Olympic period.

As of 2025, it is the 5th busiest airport in Russia and Post-Soviet states.

== History ==
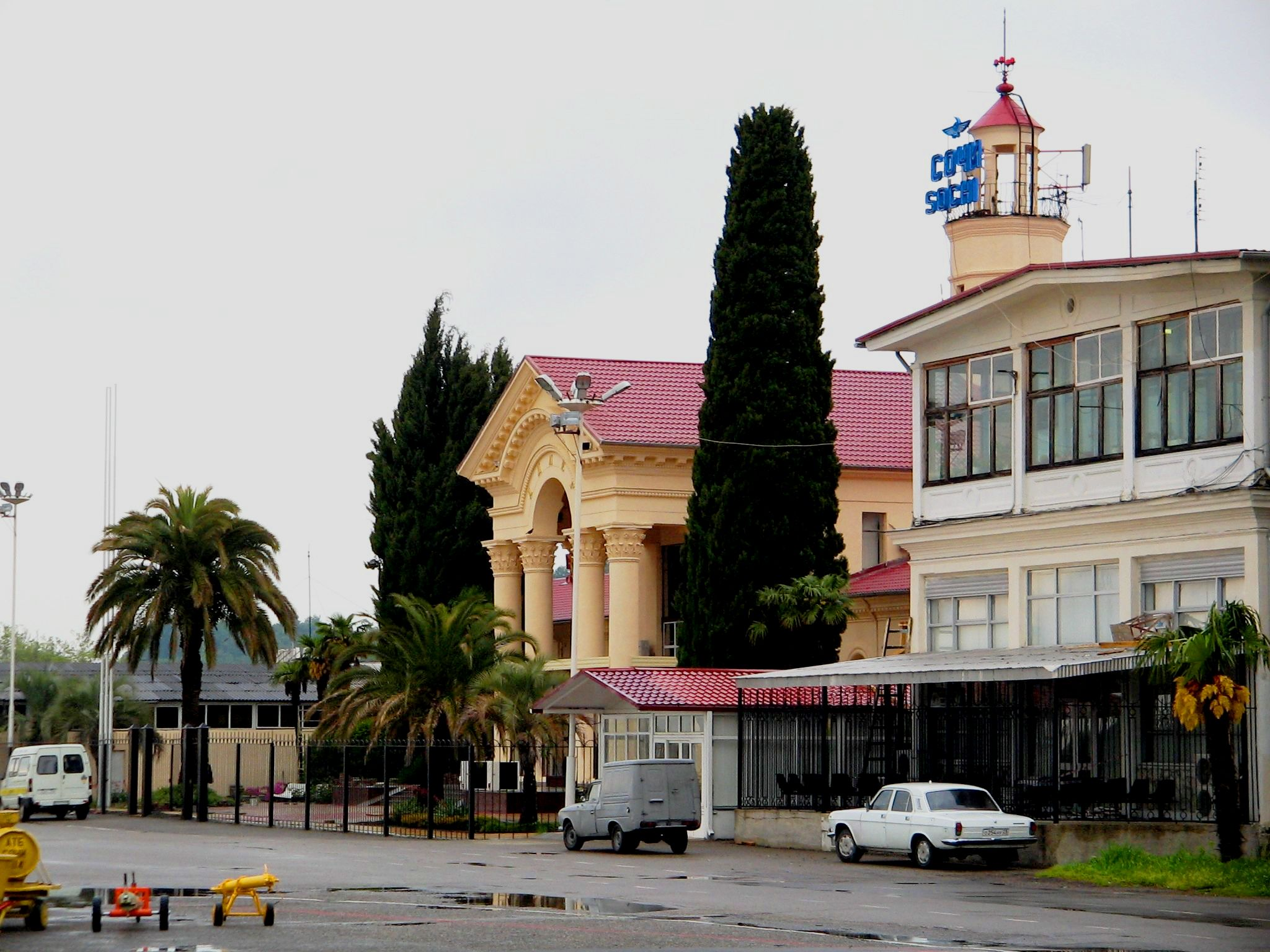
The old building of Sochi airport

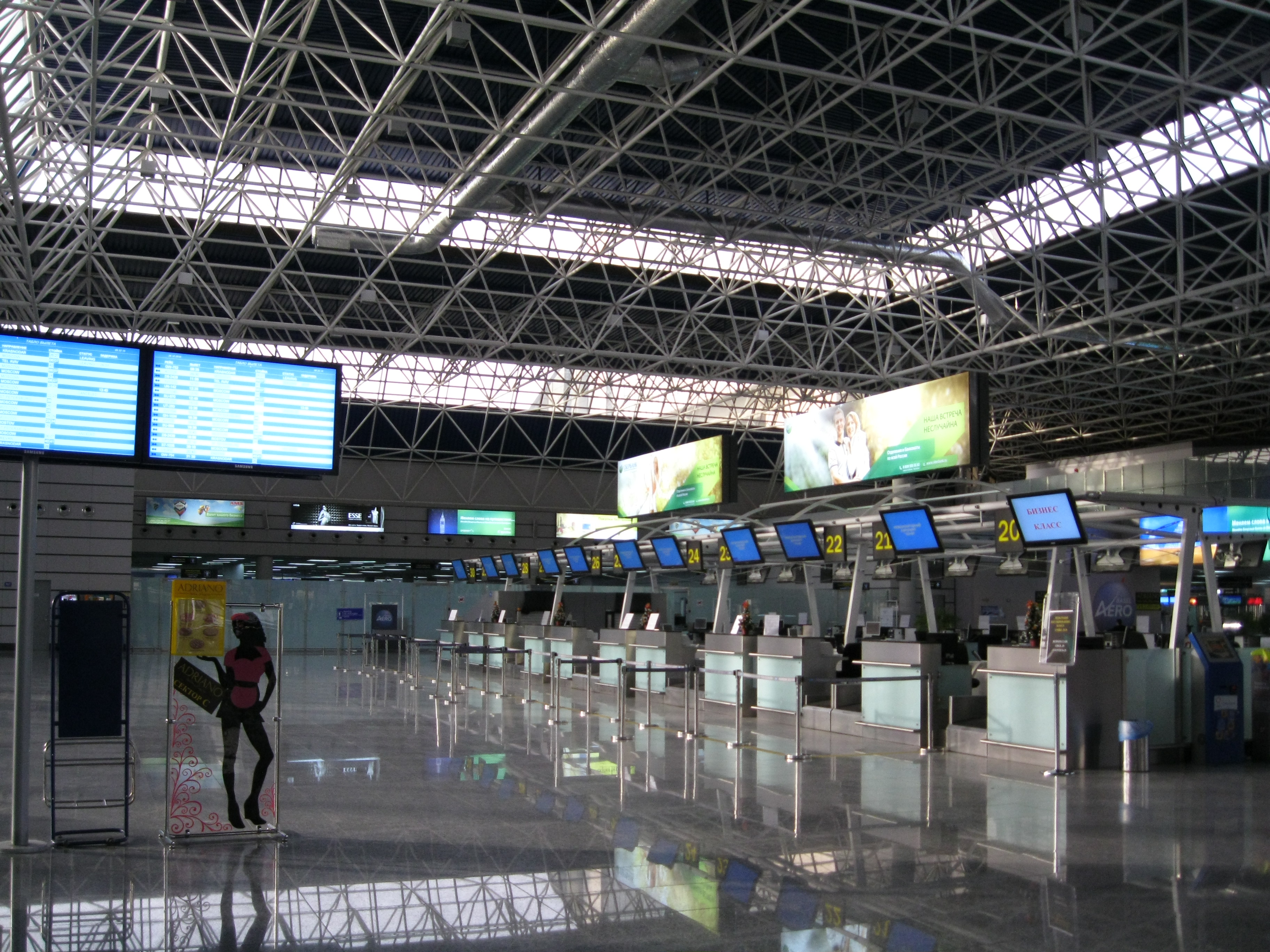
Check-in area

=== 1941–1991 ===
The original airfield was constructed to protect Russia's Black Sea coast during World War II; construction took place between 8 July and 1 September 1941, on the site of the liquidated state seed farm "Chernomorets". By order of the Chief of the Office of Civil Aviation, the site became an established airport on 23 November 1945.

In 1956, the first terminal building (now the old building) and the airstrip runway-1 were built. Approximately 35,000 passengers and 1000 tons of cargo passed through the airport in 1957. From 1960 to 1965, passenger and baggage halls, a 200-room hotel, radio navigation and landing systems were all added to the airport as passenger traffic constantly increased. The Order of the Red Banner of Labor was awarded to the airport in August 1966 for its high performance. . Passenger traffic went from 902,000 embarkations in 1965 to more than 2.3 million in 1990. From its opening in 1957 to today, the airport has served more than 60 million passengers. Regularly scheduled international departures and arrivals began in 1981; the original destinations were Bratislava, Budapest, and Prague. The airport later expanded to include flights to the Middle East and Western Europe. The international section of Sochi's terminal is small, but it includes a duty-free shop.

=== 1991–present ===
President Vladimir Putin removed Sochi International Airport from the list of strategic enterprises on 3 May 2006 (Decree No.456), superseding its previous status under Decree No.1009 of 4 August 2004.

Sochi International Airport was privatized in 2006 after Federal Property Fund held an auction to sell 100% shares of the airport. "Strategy-South", a company affiliated with Basic Element group (until 2001 – "Siberian Aluminum") won an auction to acquire the airport for 5.5 billion rubles.

The airport in Sochi became the fourth airport in southern Russia. among the ones in Krasnodar, Anapa and Gelendzhik, operated by the Russian Asian Investment Company (RAInKo, owned by Oleg Deripaska) and "Airports of South". In 2007, Basic Element group established Basel Aero, a holding company that runs its airport business and operates all four airports.

Sochi International Airport which was under renovation, opened its doors to first passengers in 2010. It was further upgraded to meet the requirements of the International Olympic Committee as the gateway of the 22nd Olympic Winter Games.

Basic Element, together with Russia's largest bank Sberbank and Changi Airports International, operator of the Singapore airport, established a joint venture to manage airports in Krasnodar region in 2012. Under the agreement, Basic Element has 50% plus one share in the JV, Sberbank's stake is 20% minus one share while Changi Airports International holds 30%.

In 2007–2013, Basic Element spent over 14 billion rubles ($410 million) on the airport's renovation. A modernized airport's building features a 65,000-sq.m terminal with an advanced 450-m long boarding gallery adjacent to the airport, 10 boarding bridges ensuring a comfortable access to the aircraft, a 4,000-sq.m VIP Terminal with the handling capacity of 80 passengers per hour that hosted IOC delegates and other high-profile guests at the Winter Olympics. In charge of these extensive Sochi projects, including the airport renovation, was Andrey Elinson, Deputy CEO of Basic Element. For his contribution to the construction of air transport infrastructure facilities, Elinson was awarded the national Order of Friendship and the state medal 'For the Construction of Transport Facilities'.

New Zealand minted coins in 2010 as part of the 'Olympic capitals' collection, and placed a picture of a plane taking off from the Sochi airport on the "tails" of a new silver dollar coin.

Due to airspace closures and aircraft seizure risks following the Russian invasion of Ukraine, Aeroflot announced in March 2022 that it would open a hub at Sochi using Rossiya-operated Sukhoi SuperJet 100 aircraft to serve 17 short-haul international destinations in 6 countries, with an aim to facilitate connecting traffic to and from Moscow, St. Petersburg, and Krasnoyarsk.

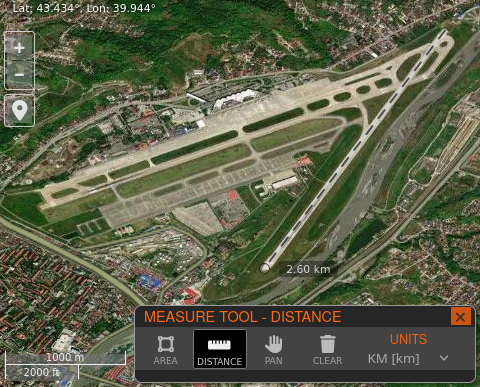
NASA's FIRMS shows runway 02/20 extended to 2.60 km

As of 2024 satellite imagery shows runway 02/20 extended to 2.60 km.

== Infrastructure ==
=== Runways ===
Sochi International Airport has two paved runways; combined with its taxiways network it has a total length of 4310 meters and a width of 40.5 m of paved tarmac. The platform and parking lot have a total area of 218 square meters, with spaces for more than 1000 cars. Because of the presence of natural obstacles (mountains) to the north and north-east of the airport, take off and landing are only possible on the sea side of the facility. The airport authority plans to extend the 06/24 runway up to 3.5 km, with a portion overlapping the Mzymta River at a width of 300 m.

The Sochi airport is certificated by Aviation Register of the MAC for its suitability for international flights. It has the ability to receive the following aircraft types: Airbus A310, Airbus A319/320/321, Airbus A350, Boeing 727, Boeing 737/747/757/767/777, CRJ 200, Fokker 70. IL-62, IL-76, IL-86, IL-96, Tu-134, Tu-144, Tu-154, Tu-204, Yak-40, Yak-42 and other planes III and IV classes. Since 2007, the airport takes aircraft of all types.

=== Main terminal ===
The capacity of the airport complex is 750 passengers per hour/ 2500 passengers per day. The current terminal building was open to public in 2007. It has 3 floors with total area of 62,000 square meters and is one of the largest in Russia. The airport has 440 meters of corridor space and 10 boarding bridges for boarding and deplaning passengers. The airport received extensive renovations in anticipation of the 2014 Winter Olympics.

On 20 November 2006, the airport was auctioned to Oleg Deripaska's Basic Element group for 5.5 billion roubles (about $206.6 million). Deripaska is also a member of the committee organizing Sochi's bid for the Winter Olympics.

The Sochi Airport railway station is located directly next to the terminal and connected via walkway bridge.

== Airlines and destinations ==
The following airlines operate regular scheduled and charter flights at Sochi Airport:

Airlines	Destinations
Aeroflot	Istanbul, Izhevsk, Kazan, Moscow–Sheremetyevo, Saint Petersburg, Samara, Ufa, Yekaterinburg
Air Anka	Seasonal charter: Antalya
Air Arabia	Seasonal: Sharjah (suspended until 27 March 2027)
Air Serbia	Belgrade
azimuth	Almaty, Antalya, Astrakhan, Atyrau, Batumi, Dubai–Al Maktoum, Istanbul, Makhachkala, Mineralnye Vody, Nalchik, Penza, Pskov, Riyadh, Samarqand, Saransk, Stavropol, Tabuk, Tashkent, Tel Aviv, Tbilisi, Yaroslavl, Yerevan; Seasonal: Bodrum
Azur Air	Seasonal charter: Antalya, Phuket
Belavia	Minsk
Centrum Air	Tashkent
Etihad Airways	Abu Dhabi
Flydubai	Dubai–International
FlyOne	Gyumri, Yerevan
Gulf Air	Seasonal: Bahrain
I-Fly	Moscow–Vnukovo
Ikar	Barnaul, Ivanovo, Kurgan, Novokuznetsk, Perm, Samara, Syktyvkar, Tyumen, Ufa; Seasonal: Kirov, Orsk, Volgograd
IrAero	Seasonal: Antalya, Astrakhan, Dalaman, Gazipaşa/Alanya, Istanbul, Makhachkala, Ufa
Jazeera Airways	Seasonal: Kuwait City
NordStar	Moscow–Domodedovo; Seasonal: Abakan
Nordwind Airlines	Cheboksary, Chelyabinsk, Kazan, Kemerovo, Krasnoyarsk–International, Magnitogorsk, Moscow–Sheremetyevo, Nizhnekamsk, Nizhnevartovsk, Nizhny Novgorod, Novokuznetsk, Novosibirsk, Omsk, Orenburg, Perm, Saint Petersburg, Samara, Surgut, Tomsk, Tyumen, Ufa, Ulyanovsk–Baratayevka, Yekaterinburg; Seasonal: Kirov
Oman Air	Muscat
Pobeda	Chelyabinsk, Kazan, Moscow–Sheremetyevo, Moscow–Vnukovo, Perm, Samara, Saratov, Ulyanovsk–Baratayevka, Ufa, Yekaterinburg; Seasonal: Kirov
Red Wings Airlines	Antalya, Bahrain, Batumi,Moscow–Zhukovsky, Tbilisi, Tel Aviv, Yerevan; Seasonal: Bodrum, Elista (suspended until 31 August 2026), Makhachkala, Vladikavkaz Mattala; Seasonal charter: Phuket
Rossiya Airlines	Antalya, Istanbul, Izhevsk, Krasnoyarsk, Moscow–Sheremetyevo, Perm, Saint Petersburg, Yerevan; Seasonal: Tomsk
S7 Airlines	Irkutsk, Moscow–Domodedovo, Novosibirsk
Severstal Avia	Cherepovets, Petrozavodsk
Southwind Airlines	Seasonal charter: Antalya
Smartavia	Seasonal: Arkhangelsk–Talagi, Chelyabinsk, Murmansk, Omsk, Orenburg, Saint Petersburg, Syktyvkar, Ufa, Yekaterinburg
Ural Airlines	Chelyabinsk, Dushanbe, Istanbul, Moscow–Domodedovo, Osh, Perm, Samara, Tashkent, Yekaterinburg, Yerevan; Seasonal: Dubai–Al Maktoum, Kemerovo; Seasonal charter: Hurghada, Sharm El Sheikh
Utair	Moscow–Vnukovo, Surgut, Tyumen; Seasonal: Khanty-Mansiysk, Nizhnevartovsk, Ufa
UVT Aero	Kazan, Nalchik
Uzbekistan Airways	Namangan, Tashkent
Yamal Airlines	Moscow–Domodedovo, Tyumen; Seasonal: Nadym, Novy Urengoy, Noyabrsk, Salekhard
Yakutia Airlines	Moscow–Vnukovo; Seasonal: Omsk

== Statistics ==
=== Annual traffic ===
Annual passenger traffic
Year	Passengers	% Change
2010	1,920,000	Steady
2011	2,086,000	▲8.6%
2012	2,120,400	▲1.6%
2013	2,427,676	▲14.5%
2014	3,106,100	▲28%
2015	4,100,000	▲32%
2016	5,263,275	▲28%
2017	5,700,000	▲8%
2018	6,343,000	▲11.3%
2019	6,772,062	▲6.8%
2020	6,519,554	▼4%

== Incidents and accidents ==
- On 28 July 1962, Aeroflot Flight 415, an Antonov An-10 crashed into the mountains near Sochi Airport, killing all 81 people aboard.
- On 1 October 1972, an Aeroflot Ilyushin Il-18V operating Aeroflot Flight 1036 crashed shortly after departure from Sochi Airport into the Black Sea, killing all 109 passengers and crew. The cause of the accident was never determined.
- On 3 May 2006, an Armavia Airbus A320-200 operating Armavia Flight 967 crashed in the Black Sea en route from Yerevan's Zvartnots International Airport to Sochi. The airplane crashed into the sea while attempting to conduct a go-around following its first approach to Sochi airport, killing all 113 aboard. The accident was the first major commercial airline crash in 2006.
- On 25 December 2016, a Russian military Tupolev Tu-154 disappeared from radar two minutes after taking off from Sochi. The aircraft was found to have crashed on the Black Sea. All 92 people on board, including the members of Russian military choir Alexandrov Ensemble were killed in the crash. The flight had originated in Moscow and was flying to Latakia in Syria.
- On 1 September 2018, Utair Flight 579, A Boeing 737-800 operating the flight, overran the runway, came to a stop in a river bed past the runway, and caught fire. 18 of the 164 passengers were injured, some from burns, some from carbon monoxide poisoning. One airport worker died during cleanup. The plane landed with a strong tail wind in heavy rain. The wind direction was changing quickly before the accident. There had already been attempts to land before the accident.

== See also ==
- List of the busiest airports in Russia
- List of the busiest airports in Europe
- List of the busiest airports in the former USSR
