= Ikar (airline) =

Russian airline

IATA	ICAO	Call sign
EO	KAR	IKAR
- Founded: 15 June 1993; 33 years ago (as Ikar)
- Hubs: Orenburg Tsentralny Airport
- Fleet size: 8
- Destinations: 30
- Headquarters: Orenburg, Russia
- Key people: Andrey Lengarov, CEO
- Website: ikar.aero

Ikar (Russian: Икар, lit. 'Icarus'), legally Ikar Airlines LLC and operating as Pegas Fly from 2015 until 2022, is a Russian charter airline headquartered in Orenburg and based at Orenburg Tsentralny Airport, however operating flights from several Russian airports. It is currently banned from flying into the EU.

== History ==
Initially the company, then operating under the Ikar brand, operated a fleet of Mil Mi-8 helicopters for aerial cargo operations mainly carrying bulky loads externally.

In 2015, the airline rebranded to become Pegas Fly, although the brand was changed the airlines legal name was kept as Ikar Airlines. As of 2022, the airline was forced to change to another brand name, as the rights to use Pegas Fly have been expired and cannot be renewed. Therefore since 2022, the airline uses its original name Ikar again.

== Destinations ==
As of May 2024, the airline operates scheduled flights in three countries on 40 routes.

Ikar operates scheduled services to the following destinations:

Country	Citу	Airport	Notes
Abkhazia / Georgia	Sukhum	Sukhumi Babushara Airport	Seasonal
Armenia	Yerevan	Zvartnots International Airport	
Belarus	Minsk	Minsk National Airport	
China	Changchun	Changchun Longjia International Airport	
China	Fuzhou	Fuzhou Changle International Airport	Seasonal
China	Guangzhou	Guangzhou Baiyun International Airport	Seasonal
China	Haikou	Haikou Meilan International Airport	Seasonal
China	Jinan	Jinan Yaoqiang International Airport	Seasonal
China	Xi'an	Xi'an Xianyang International Airport	Seasonal
Cyprus	Larnaca	Larnaca International Airport	Terminated
Germany	Berlin	Berlin Brandenburg Airport	Terminated
Germany	Düsseldorf	Düsseldorf Airport	Terminated
Russia	Arkhangelsk	Talagi Airport	
Russia	Astrakhan	Narimanovo Airport	Seasonal
Russia	Blagoveshchensk	Ignatyevo Airport	
Russia	Cheboksary	Cheboksary International Airport	Seasonal
Russia	Irkutsk	International Airport Irkutsk	
Russia	Izhevsk	Izhevsk Airport	
Russia	Kaliningrad	Khrabrovo Airport	
Russia	Kazan	Ğabdulla Tuqay Kazan International Airport	
Russia	Kemerovo	Kemerovo International Airport	
Russia	Khabarovsk	Khabarovsk Novy Airport	
Russia	Kirov	Pobedilovo Airport	
Russia	Krasnoyarsk	Krasnoyarsk International Airport	
Russia	Magadan	Sokol Airport	
Russia	Makhachkala	Uytash Airport	
Russia	Moscow	Sheremetyevo International Airport	
Russia	Moscow	Zhukovsky International Airport	Terminated
Russia	Murmansk	Emperor Nicholas II Murmansk Airport	
Russia	Nizhnekamsk	Begishevo Airport	
Russia	Nizhnevartovsk	Nizhnevartovsk Airport	
Russia	Nizhny Novgorod	Strigino Airport	
Russia	Novosibirsk	Tolmachevo Airport	
Russia	Orsk	Orsk Airport	
Russia	Perm	Bolshoye Savino Airport	
Russia	Pskov	Princess Olga Pskov International Airport	
Russia	Samara	Kurumoch International Airport	
Russia	Sochi	Adler-Sochi International Airport	
Russia	Surgut	Farman Salmanov Surgut Airport	Seasonal
Russia	Ufa	Mustai Karim Ufa International Airport	
Russia	Ulyanovsk	Ulyanovsk Baratayevka Airport	
Yekaterinburg	Koltsovo International Airport		
Yuzhno-Sakhalinsk	Khomutovo Airport		
Russia / Ukraine (Note: Disputed. See Annexation of Crimea by the Russian Federation.)	Simferopol	Amet-khan Sultan International Airport	Terminated
Thailand	Krabi	Krabi International Airport	Seasonal charter
Thailand	Pattaya	U-Tapao International Airport	Seasonal charter
Thailand	Phuket	Phuket International Airport	Seasonal charter
Turkey	Antalya	Antalya Airport	Seasonal charter
Turkey	Dalaman	Dalaman Airport	Seasonal charter
United Arab Emirates	Dubai	Al Maktoum International Airport	Seasonal charter
Vietnam	Nha Trang	Cam Ranh International Airport	Seasonal charter
Vietnam	Phú Quốc	Phu Quoc International Airport	Seasonal charter

The airline also operates charters on behalf of Pegas Touristik to tourist destinations in Europe, Africa and Asia.

== Fleet ==
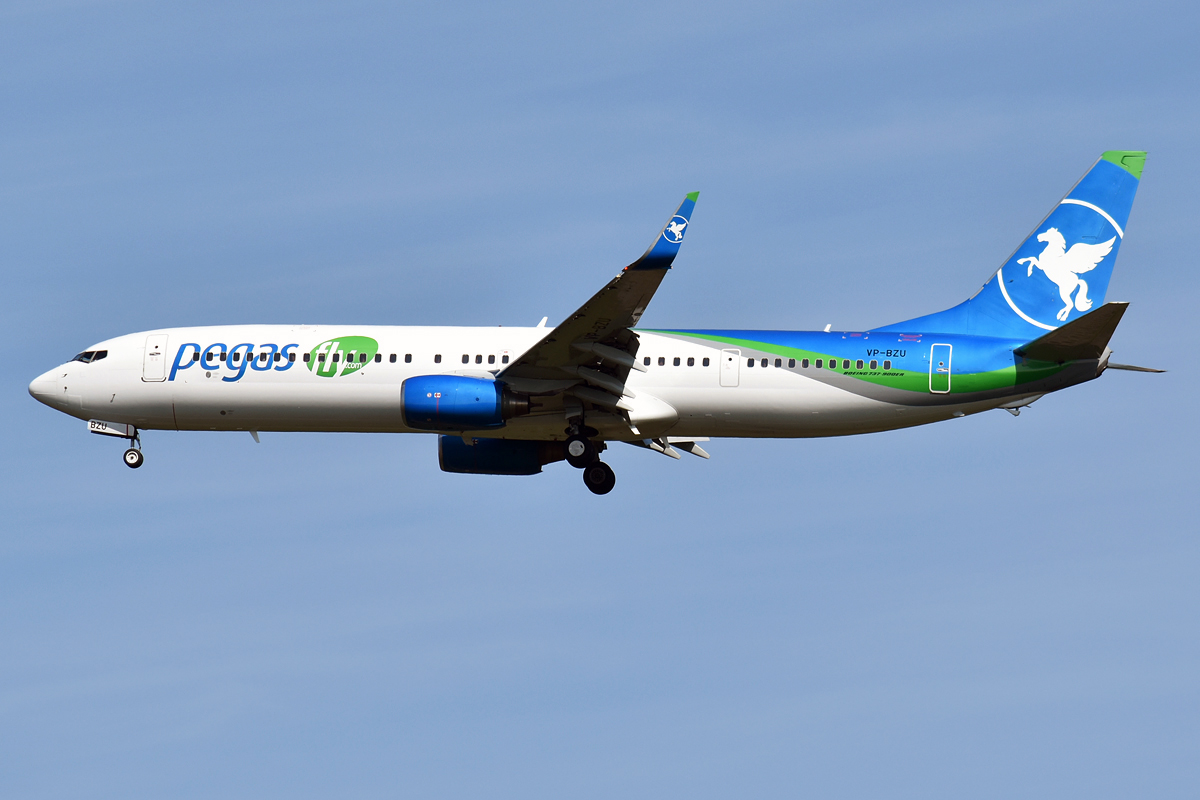
Ikar Boeing 737-900ER in former Pegas Fly branding.

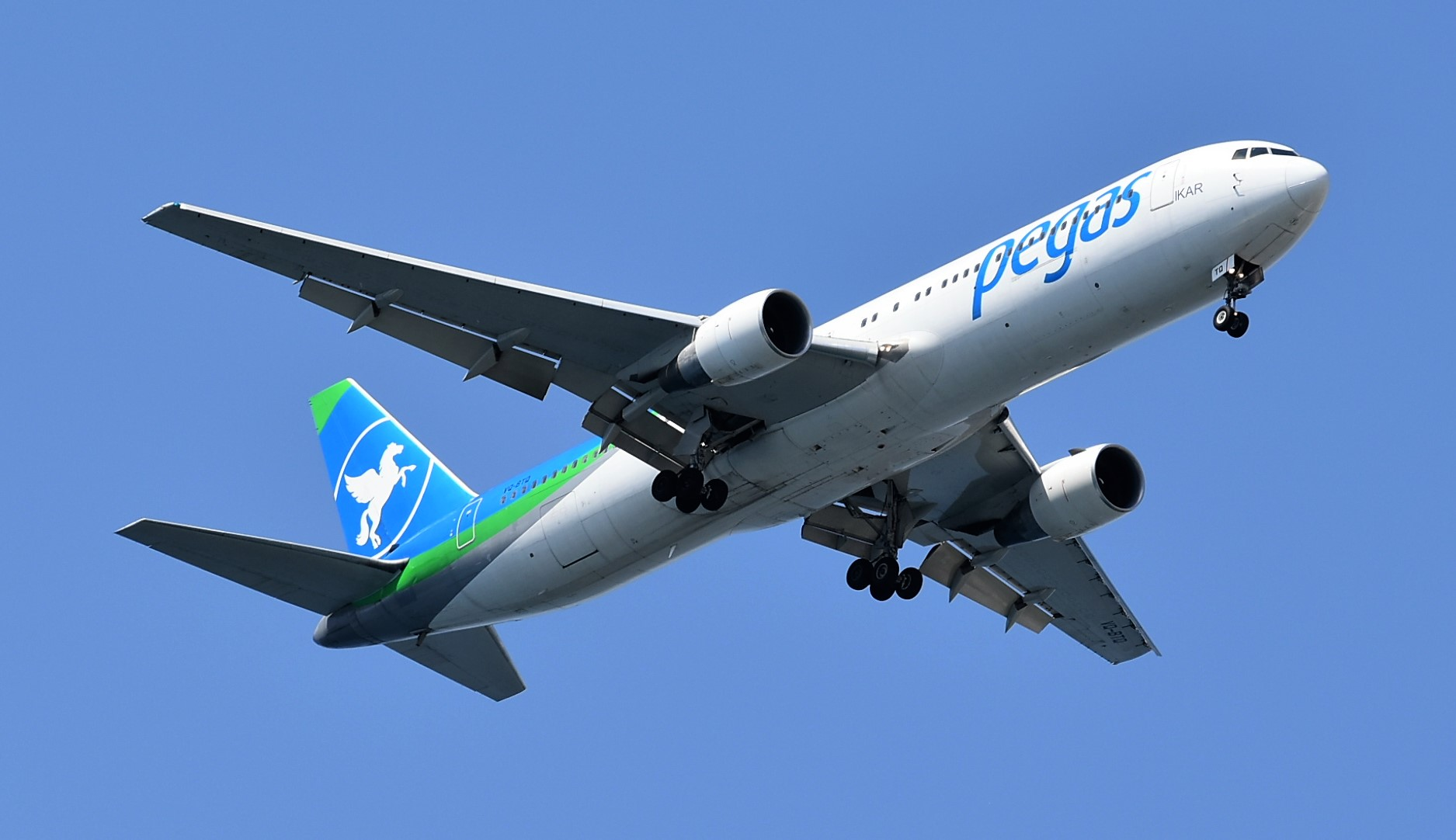
Ikar Boeing 767-300ER in former Pegas Fly branding.

As of August 2025, Ikar operates the following aircraft:

Aircraft	In service	Orders	Passengers			Notes
Aircraft	In service	Orders	P	Y	Total	Notes
Boeing 737-900ER	2	—	—	215	215	
Boeing 777-200ER	2	—	—	440	440	
Embraer 190-100	4	—	—	110	110	
Total	8	—				

== Accidents and incidents ==
- On 3 December 1995, a Mil Mi-8AMT (RA-25581) leased to Investkorp of Papua New Guinea – pilot error during very poor visibility led to a decrease in rotor speed up to 90 percent at an altitude of just 7 metres as the helicopter continued to descend, understandably at a greater rate. The helicopter crashed; the mechanic was seriously injured. Investigation revealed that the crew had received insufficient training and it was revealed that those involved were not previously certified to fly the Mil Mi-8AMT; their certificates had been signed in New Guinea under false pretence. It was also revealed that Ikar was only allowed to fly domestic routes and routes in the CIS, their activities in New Guinea had breached this order when they delivered RA-25518 and RA-27003 to New Guinea complete with their staff.
- On 11 July 2012, a Mil Mi-8 helicopter was considered 'lost' sparking a scare when connection with the helicopter had failed. Searches were conducted in a forest region in Magadan where the helicopter had been patrolling a forest fire situation. Connection was broken at 3pm (local time) that day with ten firefighters and four crew-members aboard. Another Mil Mi-8 and an Antonov An-26 were dispatched to locate the helicopter which was found safely landed on the ground in the forest, apparently there were connection issues but the helicopter and crew were uninjured.

== See also ==
- List of small airlines and helicopter airlines of Russia
