= Pobeda (airline) =

Russian airline

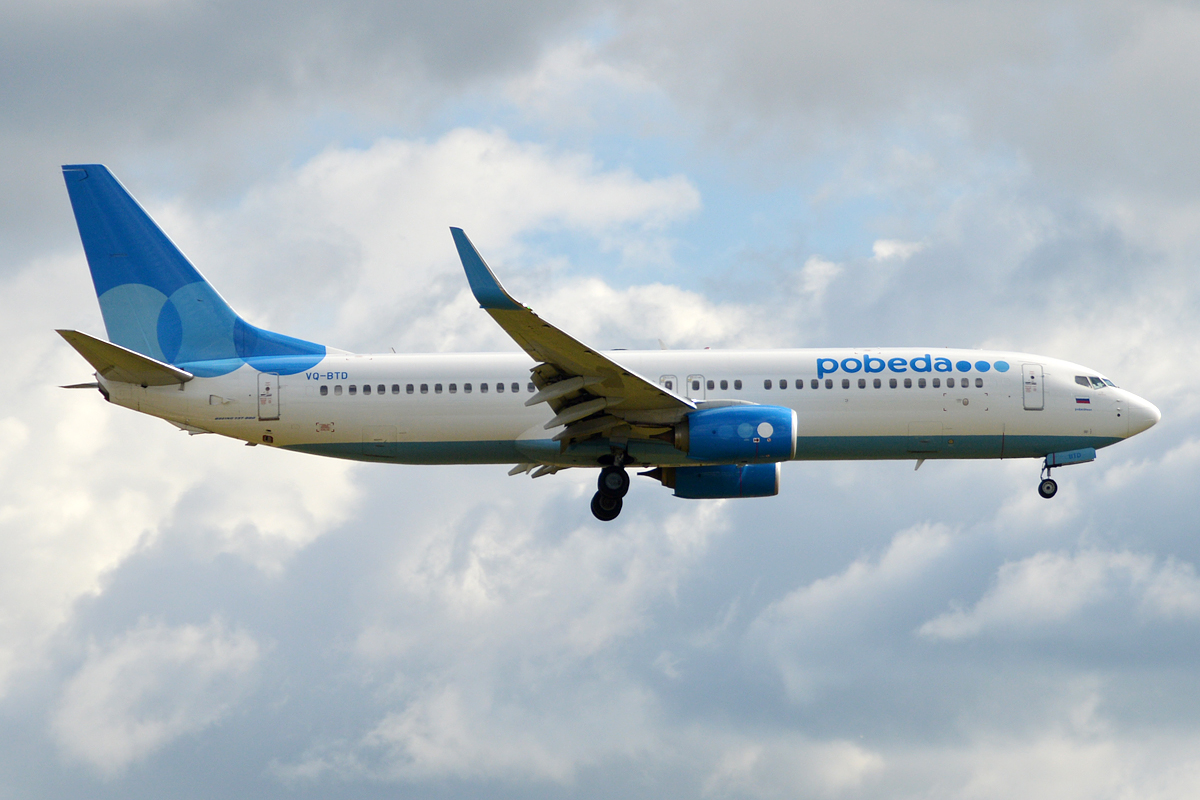
| IATA | ICAO | Call sign |
|---|---|---|
| DP | PBD | POBEDA |
- Founded: 16 September 2014; 12 years ago
- Commenced operations: 1 December 2014; 11 years ago
- Hubs: Moscow–Sheremetyevo; Moscow–Vnukovo
- Focus cities: Saint Petersburg; Sochi
- Fleet size: 42
- Destinations: 67
- Parent company: Aeroflot
- Headquarters: Moscow, Russia
- Key people: Andrey Yurikov, interim CEO.
- Revenue: ▲RUB 101.3 billion (2026) (FY 2017)
- Net income: ▼RUB 2.8 billion (FY 2017)
- Website: Official website

Pobeda LCC (Russian: ПАО Победа, lit. 'Victory') is an ultra low-cost airline and a wholly owned subsidiary of Aeroflot, the flag carrier and largest airline of Russia. It operates scheduled services to domestic and international destinations mainly from its airline hub of Sheremetyevo International Airport. Its head office is in Moscow.

Since operations commenced in late 2014, Pobeda is considered to be one of the fastest-growing airlines in Russia and Europe in 2019, becoming the third largest airline in Russia in February 2019, carrying 689,100 passengers in January 2019, a 43.7 percent improvement from the month of last year, and having a claimed value of US$800 million.

It is currently banned from flying into the European Union.

== History ==
The company Budget Carrier, LLC was registered on 16 September 2014 with Aeroflot as the only shareholder. It is the second attempt of Aeroflot to form a low-cost carrier, after Dobrolet, which ceased operation in August 2014. Pobeda received an air operator's certificate on 11 November 2014, and commerced its maiden flight on 1 December of the same year, from Moscow-Vnukovo to Volgograd. The carrier surpassed 2 million passengers in September 2015, after nine months of operation.

The airline had hoped to introduce a Moscow to Bratislava service in October 2015, but the Russian Federal Air Transport Agency turned down an application to operate international flights as the airline has to operate internally for at least two years first. Bratislava Airport and Pobeda, however, announced the launch of first international flight to Bratislava, to be commenced on 19 December 2015. Pobeda also marketed their service from Moscow to Vienna, Austria via a fly-and-ride scheme, with a bus trip from Bratislava to Vienna included as part of the service.

In December 2015, Pobeda cancelled their planned route to Salzburg after only 34 tickets were sold.

In August 2018, Pobeda announced that registration of passengers at foreign airports will be charged a fee of 25 euros per person. This caused a wide public outcry, and in December 2018 the Moscow Interregional Transport Prosecutor's Office filed a lawsuit against such a decision of the airline.

In October 2019, the court ruled that the airline should cancel the registration fee for passengers at foreign airports. In response, Pobeda announced an increase in ticket prices from abroad by 40%.

In August 2021, Andrey Kalmykov, CEO of Pobeda, delivered a skeptical point of view of state aid to Russian airline companies, describing any cancellations and bans of air routes and destinations as commercial risks.

Following the Russian invasion of Ukraine, lessors sought to recover their aircraft from Pobeda. Sanctions were placed over the shipping of spare parts for aircraft. Andrey Kalmykov resigned as CEO and left the company.

== Destinations ==
As of March 2026, Podeba serves 36 destinations in Russia, 1 in Turkey, 1 in UAE, 1 in Belarus and several in Uzbekistan.

== Fleet ==
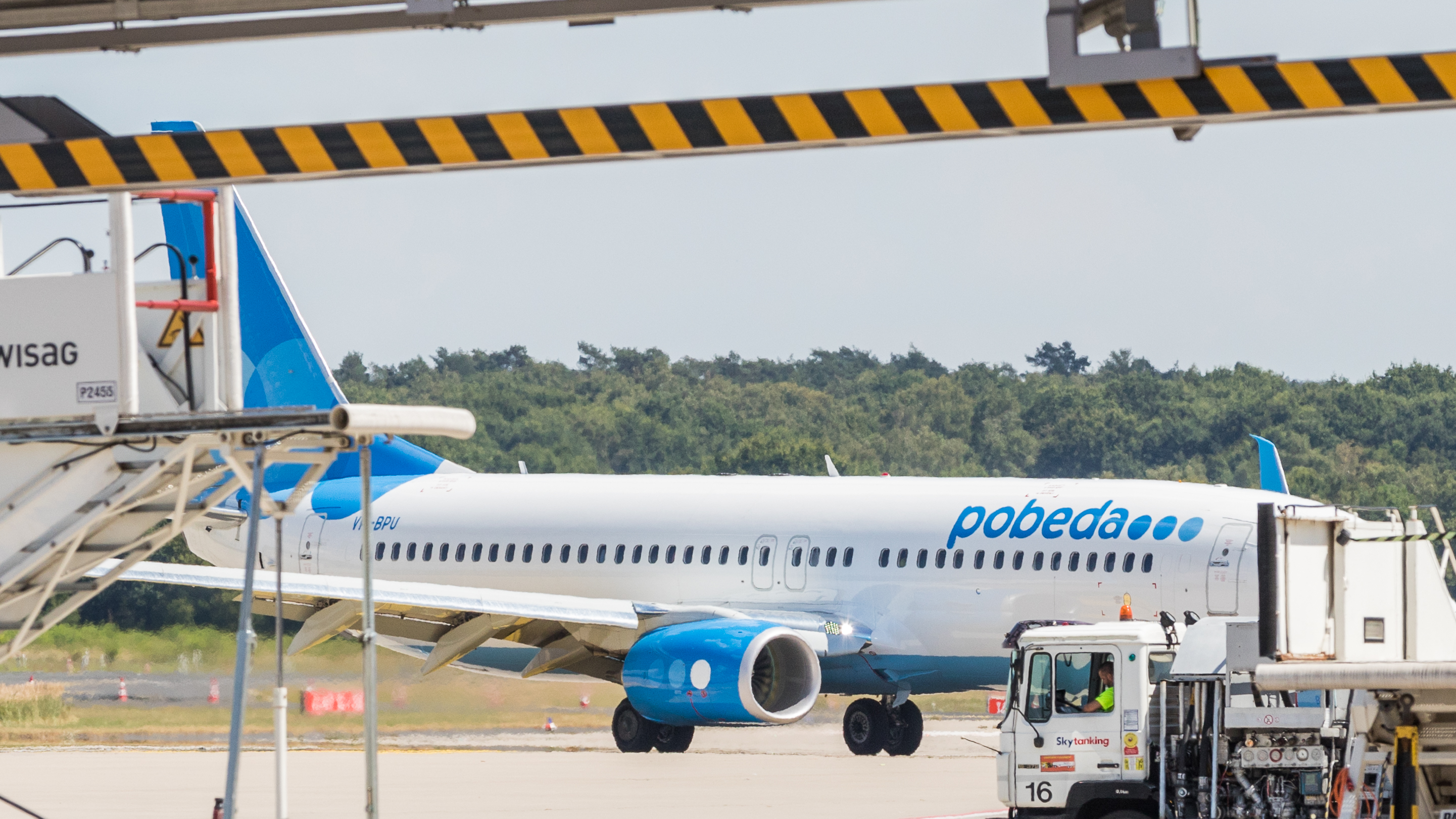
Pobeda Boeing 737-800 in Cologne-Bonn Airport

As of August 2025, Pobeda operates an all-Boeing 737 fleet composed of the following aircraft:

| Aircraft | In service | Passengers | Notes |
|---|---|---|---|
| Boeing 737-800 | 42 | 189 | |
| Total | 42 | | |

== Corporate affairs ==
=== Business trends ===
The key trends for Pobeda since 2014 are:

| | 2014 | 2015 | 2016 | 2017 | 2018 | 2019 | 2020 | 2021 |
|---|---|---|---|---|---|---|---|---|
| Turnover (₽ bln) | 0.11 | 11.3 | 18.7 | 20.6 | 35.5 | | | |
| Number of passengers (m) | 0.11 | 3.1 | 4.3 | 4.6 | 7.2 | 10.3 | 9.0 | 14.4 |
| Passenger load factor (%) | 78 | 81.2 | 88.3 | 94.2 | 94.1 | 94 | | |
| Number of aircraft (at year end) | 3 | 12 | 12 | 16 | | 30 | | |
| Notes/sources | | | | | | | | |

== Accidents and incidents ==
- 11 November 2016 – A Boeing 737-800 rolled off the runway by almost 20 metres (66 ft) at Cheboksary International Airport after landing. There were no injuries and the plane sustained minor damage.
