= List of the busiest airports in Russia =

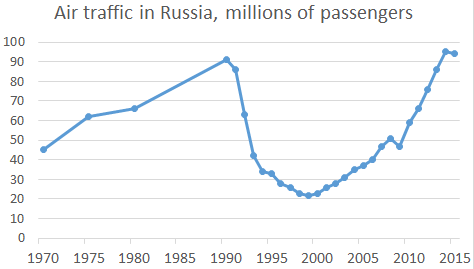
Air traffic in Russia, 1970-2015

This is a list of the busiest airports in Russia, using data from the Federal Air Transport Agency.

== Russia's busiest airports by passenger traffic in 2024 ==
Data for airports with total traffic over 1,000,000 passengers. Source: Russian Federal Air Transport Agency

| Rank | Airport | Region | City | IATA code | Internal code | Passengers 2024 | Annual growth |
|---|---|---|---|---|---|---|---|
| 1 | Sheremetyevo International Airport | Moscow; Moscow Oblast | Moscow | SVO | ШРМ | 43,712,000 | ▲20.0% |
| 2 | Pulkovo Airport | Saint Petersburg; Leningrad Oblast | Saint Petersburg | LED | ПЛК | 20,900,000 | ▲3.0% |
| 3 | Vnukovo International Airport | Moscow | Moscow | VKO | ВНК | 16,095,000 | ▲11.0% |
| 4 | Moscow Domodedovo Airport | Moscow; Moscow Oblast | Moscow | DME | ДМД | 15,600,000 | ▼−21.9% |
| 5 | Sochi International Airport | Krasnodar Krai | Sochi | AER | АДЛ | 13,726,000 | ▼−1.3% |
| 6 | Tolmachevo Airport | Novosibirsk Oblast | Novosibirsk | OVB | ТЛЧ | 9,299,000 | ▲2.3% |
| 7 | Koltsovo Airport | Sverdlovsk Oblast | Yekaterinburg | SVX | КЛЦ | 8,047,000 | ▲9.0% |
| 8 | Ğabdulla Tuqay Kazan International Airport | Tatarstan | Kazan | KZN | КЗН | 5,369,000 | ▲3.9% |
| 9 | Mineralnye Vody Airport | Stavropol Krai | Mineralnye Vody | MRV | МРВ | 4,860,000 | ▲1.4% |
| 10 | Khrabrovo Airport | Kaliningrad Oblast | Kaliningrad | KGD | КЛД | 4,814,000 | ▲11.9% |
| 11 | Mustai Karim Ufa International Airport | Bashkortostan | Ufa | UFA | УФА | 4,800,000 | ▼−0.9% |
| 12 | Krasnoyarsk International Airport | Krasnoyarsk Krai | Krasnoyarsk | KJA | КЯА | 4,283,000 | ▲13.5% |
| 13 | International Airport Irkutsk | Irkutsk Oblast | Irkutsk | IKT | ИКТ | 3,957,000 | ▲4.5% |
| 14 | Kurumoch International Airport | Samara Oblast | Samara | KUF | СКЧ | 3,570,000 | ▲0.8% |
| 15 | Vladivostok International Airport | Primorsky Krai | Vladivostok | VVO | ВВО | 2,971,000 | ▲17.0% |
| 16 | Uytash Airport | Dagestan | Makhachkala | MCX | МХЛ | 2,899,000 | ▲3.5% |
| 17 | Roschino International Airport | Tyumen Oblast | Tyumen | TJM | РЩН | 2,776,000 | ▲6.7% |
| 18 | Khabarovsk Novy Airport | Khabarovsk Krai | Khabarovsk | KHV | ХБР | 2,446,000 | ▲8.0% |
| 19 | Surgut International Airport | Tyumen Oblast; Khanty-Mansi Autonomous Okrug | Surgut | SGC | СУР | 2,221,000 | ▲3.0% |
| 20 | Balandino Airport | Chelyabinsk Oblast | Chelyabinsk | CEK | ЧЛБ | 2,172,000 | ▲0.5% |
| 21 | Bolshoye Savino Airport | Perm Krai | Perm | PEE | ПРЬ | 1,972,000 | ▼−1.0% |
| 22 | Omsk Tsentralny Airport | Omsk Oblast | Omsk | OMS | ОМС | 1,726,000 | ▲2.7% |
| 23 | Gumrak Airport | Volgograd Oblast | Volgograd | VOG | ВГГ | 1,680,000 | ▲7.1% |
| 24 | Khomutovo Airport | Sakhalin Oblast | Yuzhno-Sakhalinsk | UUS | ЮЖХ | 1,542,000 | ▲9.0% |
| 25 | Zhukovsky International Airport | Moscow; Moscow Oblast | Moscow | ZIA | РНУ | 1,491,000 | ▲3.0% |
| 26 | Strigino Airport | Nizhny Novgorod Oblast | Nizhny Novgorod | GOJ | НЖС | 1,470,000 | ▲5.0% |
| 27 | Murmansk Airport | Murmansk Oblast | Murmansk | MMK | МУН | 1,467,000 | ▲2.2% |
| 28 | Saratov Gagarin Airport | Saratov Oblast | Saratov | GSV | ГСВ | 1,150,000 | ▲8.0% |
| 29 | Novy Urengoy Airport | Tyumen Oblast; Yamalo-Nenets Autonomous Okrug | Novy Urengoy | NUX | НУР | 1,072,000 | ▲1.6% |
| 30 | Talagi Airport | Arkhangelsk Oblast | Arkhangelsk | ARH | АХГ | 1,058,000 | ▲146.0% |
| 31 | Orenburg Tsentralny Airport | Orenburg Oblast | Orenburg | REN | ОНГ | 1,005,000 | ▼3.6% |

== Russia's busiest airports by passenger traffic in 2019 (provisional) ==
Includes airports with total traffic over 100,000 passengers. Source: Russian Federal Air Transport Agency (see also provisional 2019 statistics)

| Rank | Airport | Region | City | IATA code | Passengers 2019 | Annual growth | Rank change 2017–2018 |
|---|---|---|---|---|---|---|---|
| 1 | Sheremetyevo International Airport | Moscow; Moscow Oblast | Moscow | SVO | 49,438,545 | ▲9.0% | Steady |
| 2 | Domodedovo International Airport | Moscow; Moscow Oblast | Moscow | DME | 28,252,337 | ▼−3.9% | Steady |
| 3 | Vnukovo International Airport | Moscow | Moscow | VKO | 24,001,521 | ▲11.7% | Steady |
| 4 | Pulkovo Airport | Saint Petersburg; Leningrad Oblast | Saint Petersburg | LED | 19,581,262 | ▲8.0% | Steady |
| 5 | Sochi International Airport | Krasnodar Krai | Sochi | AER | 6,760,567 | ▲6.6% | Steady |
| 6 | Tolmachevo Airport | Novosibirsk Oblast | Novosibirsk | OVB | 6,571,396 | ▲14.9% | ▲1 |
| 7 | Koltsovo Airport | Sverdlovsk Oblast | Yekaterinburg | SVX | 6,232,318 | ▲4.7% | ▼1 |
| 8 | Simferopol International Airport (Note: Subject of a territorial dispute between Ukraine and Russia. Controlled by Russia) | (Republic of Crimea (Russia)) Republic of Crimea | Simferopol | SIP | 5,140,000 | ▼−0.1% | Steady |
| 9 | Pashkovsky Airport | Krasnodar Krai | Krasnodar | KRR | 4,630,770 | ▲11.3% | Steady |
| 10 | Ufa International Airport | Bashkortostan | Ufa | UFA | 3,556,533 | ▲10.4% | ▲1 |
| 11 | Kazan International Airport | Tatarstan | Kazan | KZN | 3,470,742 | ▲10.5% | ▲1 |
| 12 | Vladivostok International Airport | Primorsky Krai | Vladivostok | VVO | 3,079,344 | ▲16.9% | ▲2 |
| 13 | Platov International Airport | Rostov Oblast | Rostov on Don | ROV | 3,060,000 | ▼−5.4% | ▼3 |
| 14 | Kurumoch International Airport | Samara Oblast | Samara | KUF | 2,999,252 | ▼−1.9% | ▼1 |
| 15 | Mineralnye Vody Airport | Stavropol Krai | Mineralnye Vody | MRV | 2,526,419 | ▲4.9% | ▲1 |
| 16 | Yemelyanovo Airport | Krasnoyarsk Krai | Krasnoyarsk | KJA | 2,481,914 | ▲−1.4% | ▼1 |
| 17 | Irkutsk Airport | Irkutsk Oblast | Irkutsk | IKT | 2,433,794 | ▲11.5% | Steady |
| 18 | Khrabrovo Airport | Kaliningrad Oblast | Kaliningrad | KGD | 2,370,157 | ▲10.3% | Steady |
| 19 | Khabarovsk Novy Airport | Khabarovsk Krai | Khabarovsk | KHV | 2,185,051 | ▲2.4% | Steady |
| 20 | Roschino International Airport | Tyumen Oblast | Tyumen | TJM | 2,039,007 | ▲3.0% | Steady |
| 21 | Surgut Airport | Tyumen Oblast; Khanty-Mansi Autonomous Okrug | Surgut | SGC | 1,866,416 | ▲6.5% | Steady |
| 22 | Balandino Airport | Chelyabinsk Oblast | Chelyabinsk | CEK | 1,713,532 | ▲4.4% | Steady |
| 23 | Bolshoye Savino Airport | Perm Krai | Perm | PEE | 1,647,005 | ▲8.4% | Steady |
| 24 | Vityazevo Airport | Krasnodar Krai | Anapa | AAQ | 1,641,376 | ▲10.4% | Steady |
| 25 | Uytash Airport | Dagestan | Makhachkala | MCX | 1,500,690 | ▲16.3% | Steady |
| 26 | Omsk Tsentralny Airport | Omsk Oblast | Omsk | OMS | 1,348,505 | ▲23.8% | ▲3 |
| 27 | Zhukovsky International Airport | Moscow; Moscow Oblast | Moscow | ZIA | 1,320,000 | ▲13.6% | ▼1 |
| 28 | Volgograd International Airport | Volgograd Oblast | Volgograd | VOG | 1,214,216 | ▲6,2% | ▼1 |
| 29 | Yuzhno-Sakhalinsk Airport | Sakhalin Oblast | Yuzhno-Sakhalinsk | UUS | 1,209,161 | ▲13.6% | ▲1 |
| 30 | Strigino Airport | Nizhny Novgorod Oblast | Nizhny Novgorod | GOJ | 1,114,056 | ▼−1.8% | ▼2 |
| 31 | Murmansk Airport | Murmansk Oblast | Murmansk | MMK | 1,029,661 | ▲9.8% | ▲2 |
| 32 | Novy Urengoy Airport | Tyumen Oblast; Yamalo-Nenets Autonomous Okrug | Novy Urengoy | NUX | 973,705 | ▲0.1% | ▼1 |
| 33 | Yakutsk Airport | Sakha Republic | Yakutsk | YKS | 949,746 | ▲4.6% | ▲1 |
| 34 | Talagi Airport | Arkhangelsk Oblast | Arkhangelsk | ARH | 922,539 | ▼−2.2% | ▼2 |
| 35 | Chertovitskoye Airport | Voronezh Oblast | Voronezh | VOZ | 856,969 | ▲11.8% | ▲2 |
| 36 | Orenburg Tsentralny Airport | Orenburg Oblast | Orenburg | REN | 783,647 | ▲−1.1% | ▼1 |
| 37 | Begishevo Airport | Tatarstan | Naberezhnye Chelny | NBC | 782,501 | ▲0.7% | ▼1 |
| 38 | Yelizovo Airport | Kamchatka Krai | Petropavlovsk-Kamchatsky | PKC | 757,698 | ▲8.7% | Steady |
| 39 | Nizhnevartovsk Airport | Tyumen Oblast; Khanty-Mansi Autonomous Okrug | Nizhnevartovsk | NJC | 749,520 | ▲14.9% | Steady |
| 40 | Bogashevo Airport | Tomsk Oblast | Tomsk | TOF | 732,754 | ▲19.0% | Steady |
| 41 | Narimanovo Airport | Astrakhan Oblast | Astrakhan | ASF | 672,456 | ▲12.6% | Steady |
| 42 | Saratov Tsentralny Airport + Saratov Gagarin Airport | Saratov Oblast | Saratov | RTW; GSV | 585,550 | ▲37.5% | ▲7 |
| 43 | Beslan Airport | North Ossetia–Alania | Vladikavkaz | OGZ | 565,581 | ▲26.2% | ▲5 |
| 44 | Ignatyevo Airport | Amur Oblast | Blagoveshchensk | BQS | 552,802 | ▲33.9% | ▲6 |
| 45 | Syktyvkar Airport | Komi Republic | Syktyvkar | SCW | 549,748 | ▼−2.5% | ▼3 |
| 46 | Barnaul Airport | Altai Krai | Barnaul | BAX | 519,743 | ▲2.4% | ▼3 |
| 47 | Alykel Airport | Krasnoyarsk Krai | Norilsk | NSK | 514,501 | ▲3.0% | ▼3 |
| 48 | Kemerovo Airport | Kemerovo Oblast | Kemerovo | KEJ | 512,916 | ▲3.8% | ▼3 |
| 49 | Baikal International Airport | Buryatia | Ulan-Ude | UUD | 478,448 | ▲27.0% | ▲5 |
| 50 | Belgorod Airport | Belgorod Oblast | Belgorod | EGO | 468,672 | ▼2.8% | ▼3 |
| 51 | Grozny Airport | Chechnya | Grozny | GRV | 458,000(2018) | ▲61.7% | ▼5 |
| 52 | Kadala Airport | Zabaykalsky Krai | Chita | HTA | 455,350 | ▲16.9% | Steady |
| 53 | Sokol Airport | Magadan Oblast | Magadan | GDX | 425,652 | ▲9.8% | Steady |
| 54 | Stavropol Airport | Stavropol Krai | Stavropol | STW | 411,895 | ▲5.0% | ▼3 |
| 55 | Khanty-Mansiysk Airport | Tyumen Oblast; Khanty-Mansi Autonomous Okrug | Khanty-Mansiysk | HMA | 406,445 | ▲39.6% | ▲6 |
| 56 | Cheboksary Airport | Chuvashia | Cheboksary | CSY | 394,586 | ▲46.1% | ▲8 |
| 57 | Sabetta International Airport | Tyumen Oblast; Yamalo-Nenets Autonomous Okrug | Sabetta | SBT | 369,819(2017) | ▲54.3% | ▼2 |
| 58 | Mirny Airport | Sakha Republic | Mirny | MJZ | 363,545 | ▲6.2% | ▼1 |
| 59 | Izhevsk Airport | Udmurtia | Izhevsk | IJK | 352,412(2018) | ▲11.6% | ▼3 |
| 60 | Ulyanovsk Baratayevka Airport | Ulyanovsk Oblast | Ulyanovsk | ULV | 344,158 | ▲402.0% | ▲new |
| 61 | Gelendzhik Airport | Krasnodar Krai | Gelendzhik | GDZ | 338,786 | ▲15.0% | ▼1 |
| 62 | Magas Airport | Ingushetia | Nazran | IGT | 300,000 | ▲23.5% | ▲1 |
| 63 | Talakan Airport | Sakha Republic | Vitim | TLK | 300,000(2018) | ▲13.0% | ▼5 |
| 64 | Salekhard Airport | Tyumen Oblast; Yamalo-Nenets Autonomous Okrug | Salekhard | SLY | 298,104(2017) | ▲1.6% | ▼5 |
| 65 | Igarka Airport | Krasnoyarsk Krai | Igarka | IAA | 278,039(2017) | ▲29.7% | ▼3 |
| 66 | Spichenkovo Airport | Kemerovo Oblast | Novokuznetsk | NOZ | 256,150 | ▲3.8% | ▼1 |
| 67 | Pobedilovo Airport | Kirov Oblast | Kirov | KVX | 240,842 | ▲87.8% | ▲12 |
| 68 | Magnitogorsk Airport | Bashkortostan; Chelyabinsk Oblast | Magnitogorsk | MQF | 236,749(2018) | ▲51.3% | ▼2 |
| 69 | Noyabrsk Airport | Tyumen Oblast; Yamalo-Nenets Autonomous Okrug | Noyabrsk | NOJ | 228,365 | ▲16.4% | ▼1 |
| 70 | Nadym Airport | Tyumen Oblast; Yamalo-Nenets Autonomous Okrug | Nadym | NYM | 212,451 | ▲13.8% | ▼1 |
| 71 | Abakan Airport | Khakassia | Abakan | ABA | 209,772 | ▲6.4% | ▼4 |
| 72 | Penza Airport | Penza Oblast | Penza | PEZ | 186,175 | ▲2.9% | ▼1 |
| 73 | Naryan-Mar Airport | Arkhangelsk Oblast; Nenets Autonomous Okrug | Naryan-Mar | NNM | 183,127(2017) | ▼−9.7% | ▼3 |
| 74 | Usinsk Airport | Komi Republic | Usinsk | USK | 158,657(2017) | ▼−2.2% | ▼1 |
| 75 | Cherepovets Airport | Vologda Oblast | Cherepovets | CEE | 149,068(2017) | ▲4.7% | ▼1 |
| 76 | Bovanenkovo Airport | Tyumen Oblast; Yamalo-Nenets Autonomous Okrug | Bovanenkovo | BVJ | 146,600(2018) | ▲13.8% | ▼1 |
| 77 | Kogalym Airport | Tyumen Oblast; Khanty-Mansi Autonomous Okrug | Kogalym | KGP | 135,978 | ▼−0.1% | ▼1 |
| 78 | Bratsk Airport | Irkutsk Oblast | Bratsk | BTK | 135,321(2018) | ▲9.9% | ▼1 |
| 79 | Kaluga Airport | Kaluga Oblast | Kaluga | KLF | 119,667 | ▲19.7% | ▲3 |
| 80 | Nalchik Airport | Kabardino-Balkaria | Nalchik | NAL | 118,429 | ▼−12.3% | ▼2 |
| 81 | Chulman Airport | Sakha Republic | Neryungri | NER | 115,336(2017) | ▲37.8% | ▼1 |
| 82 | Gorno-Altaysk Airport | Altai Republic | Gorno-Altaysk | RGK | 102,338 | ▲63,6% | ▲new |
| 83 | Ugolny Airport | Chukotka Autonomous Okrug | Anadyr | DYR | 102,129 | ▲−0.7% | ▼2 |
| 84 | Kurgan Airport | Kurgan Oblast | Kurgan | KRO | 100,000 | ▲14.0% | ▲ |

== Russia's busiest airports by passenger traffic in 2018 (provisional) ==
Includes airports with total traffic over 100,000 passengers. Source: Russian Federal Air Transport Agency (see also provisional 2018 statistics)

| Rank | Airport | Region | City | IATA code | Passengers 2018 | Annual growth | Rank change 2017–2018 |
|---|---|---|---|---|---|---|---|
| 1 | Sheremetyevo International Airport | Moscow; Moscow Oblast | Moscow | SVO | 45,348,150 | ▲14.4% | Steady |
| 2 | Domodedovo International Airport | Moscow; Moscow Oblast | Moscow | DME | 29,403,704 | ▼ −4.1% | Steady |
| 3 | Vnukovo International Airport | Moscow | Moscow | VKO | 21,478,486 | ▲18.4% | Steady |
| 4 | Pulkovo Airport | Saint Petersburg; Leningrad Oblast | Saint Petersburg | LED | 18,123,064 | ▲12.4% | Steady |
| 5 | Sochi International Airport | Krasnodar Krai | Sochi | AER | 6,343,869 | ▲11.6% | Steady |
| 6 | Koltsovo Airport | Sverdlovsk Oblast | Yekaterinburg | SVX | 5,953,840 | ▲12.8% | Steady |
| 7 | Tolmachevo Airport | Novosibirsk Oblast | Novosibirsk | OVB | 5,721,367 | ▲19.0% | ▲1 |
| 8 | Simferopol International Airport | (Republic of Crimea (Russia)) Republic of Crimea | Simferopol | SIP | 5,146,095 | ▲0.4% | ▼1 |
| 9 | Pashkovsky Airport | Krasnodar Krai | Krasnodar | KRR | 4,160,053 | ▲19.0% | Steady |
| 10 | Platov International Airport | Rostov Oblast | Rostov on Don | ROV | 3,236,000 | ▲17.0% | ▲1 |
| 11 | Ufa International Airport | Bashkortostan | Ufa | UFA | 3,222,825 | ▲15.3% | ▼1 |
| 12 | Kazan International Airport | Tatarstan | Kazan | KZN | 3,141,776 | ▲19.2% | ▲1 |
| 13 | Kurumoch International Airport | Samara Oblast | Samara | KUF | 3,056,610 | ▲16.1% | ▼1 |
| 14 | Vladivostok International Airport | Primorsky Krai | Vladivostok | VVO | 2,633,630 | ▲21.3% | ▲2 |
| 15 | Yemelyanovo Airport | Krasnoyarsk Krai | Krasnoyarsk | KJA | 2,517,298 | ▲11.5% | ▼1 |
| 16 | Mineralnye Vody Airport | Stavropol Krai | Mineralnye Vody | MRV | 2,408,000 | ▲9.9% | ▼1 |
| 17 | Irkutsk Airport | Irkutsk Oblast | Irkutsk | IKT | 2,181,998 | ▲10.6% | ▲1 |
| 18 | Khrabrovo Airport | Kaliningrad Oblast | Kaliningrad | KGD | 2,149,413 | ▲20.2% | ▲2 |
| 19 | Khabarovsk Novy Airport | Khabarovsk Krai | Khabarovsk | KHV | 2,134,476 | ▲4.3% | ▼2 |
| 20 | Roschino International Airport | Tyumen Oblast | Tyumen | TJM | 1,978,979 | ▲8.6% | ▼1 |
| 21 | Surgut Airport | Tyumen Oblast; Khanty-Mansi Autonomous Okrug | Surgut | SGC | 1,752,278 | ▲1.8% | Steady |
| 22 | Balandino Airport | Chelyabinsk Oblast | Chelyabinsk | CEK | 1,640,535 | ▲11.6% | Steady |
| 23 | Bolshoye Savino Airport | Perm Krai | Perm | PEE | 1,519,617 | ▲13.5% | ▲1 |
| 24 | Vityazevo Airport | Krasnodar Krai | Anapa | AAQ | 1,487,382 | ▲9.1% | ▼1 |
| 25 | Uytash Airport | Dagestan | Makhachkala | MCX | 1,290,000 | ▲20.8% | Steady |
| 26 | Zhukovsky International Airport | Moscow; Moscow Oblast | Moscow | ZIA | 1,161,633 | ▲173.0% | ▲20 |
| 27 | Volgograd International Airport | Volgograd Oblast | Volgograd | VOG | 1,142,878 | ▲12,7% | ▼1 |
| 28 | Strigino Airport | Nizhny Novgorod Oblast | Nizhny Novgorod | GOJ | 1,134,534 | ▲18.0% | Steady |
| 29 | Omsk Tsentralny Airport | Omsk Oblast | Omsk | OMS | 1,088,926 | ▲14.8% | Steady |
| 30 | Yuzhno-Sakhalinsk Airport | Sakhalin Oblast | Yuzhno-Sakhalinsk | UUS | 1,064,853 | ▲8.1% | ▼3 |
| 31 | Novy Urengoy Airport | Tyumen Oblast; Yamalo-Nenets Autonomous Okrug | Novy Urengoy | NUX | 972,668 | ▲3.5% | ▼1 |
| 32 | Talagi Airport | Arkhangelsk Oblast | Arkhangelsk | ARH | 942,972 | ▲5.7% | Steady |
| 33 | Murmansk Airport | Murmansk Oblast | Murmansk | MMK | 938,022 | ▲10.8% | Steady |
| 34 | Yakutsk Airport | Sakha Republic | Yakutsk | YKS | 908,384 | ▲0.7% | ▼3 |
| 35 | Orenburg Tsentralny Airport | Orenburg Oblast | Orenburg | REN | 792,316 | ▲6.5% | ▼1 |
| 36 | Begishevo Airport | Tatarstan | Naberezhnye Chelny | NBC | 777,263 | ▲32.2% | ▲3 |
| 37 | Chertovitskoye Airport | Voronezh Oblast | Voronezh | VOZ | 766,291 | ▲26.4% | ▲1 |
| 38 | Yelizovo Airport | Kamchatka Krai | Petropavlovsk-Kamchatsky | PKC | 697,094 | ▲5.8% | ▼2 |
| 39 | Nizhnevartovsk Airport | Tyumen Oblast; Khanty-Mansi Autonomous Okrug | Nizhnevartovsk | NJC | 652,129 | ▼ −2.6% | ▼4 |
| 40 | Bogashevo Airport | Tomsk Oblast | Tomsk | TOF | 615,568 | ▼ −0.3% | ▼3 |
| 41 | Narimanovo Airport | Astrakhan Oblast | Astrakhan | ASF | 597,038 | ▲2.8% | ▼1 |
| 42 | Syktyvkar Airport | Komi Republic | Syktyvkar | SCW | 563,965 | ▲10.2% | Steady |
| 43 | Barnaul Airport | Altai Krai | Barnaul | BAX | 507,510 | ▼2.8% | ▼2 |
| 44 | Alykel Airport | Krasnoyarsk Krai | Norilsk | NSK | 499,380 | ▲8.2% | ▲1 |
| 45 | Kemerovo Airport | Kemerovo Oblast | Kemerovo | KEJ | 494,295 | ▲24.2% | ▲3 |
| 46 | Grozny Airport | Chechnya | Grozny | GRV | 458,000 | ▲61.7% | ▲12 |
| 47 | Belgorod Airport | Belgorod Oblast | Belgorod | EGO | 455,902 | ▼ −2.7% | ▼3 |
| 48 | Beslan Airport | North Ossetia–Alania | Vladikavkaz | OGZ | 448,000 | ▲28.3% | ▲4 |
| 49 | Saratov Tsentralny Airport | Saratov Oblast | Saratov | RTW | 425,867 | ▼ −11.6% | ▼6 |
| 50 | Ignatyevo Airport | Amur Oblast | Blagoveshchensk | BQS | 412,835 | ▲3.5% | ▼3 |
| 51 | Stavropol Airport | Stavropol Krai | Stavropol | STW | 392,246 | ▲10.1% | ▲1 |
| 52 | Kadala Airport | Zabaykalsky Krai | Chita | HTA | 389,541 | ▲8.6% | ▼1 |
| 53 | Sokol Airport | Magadan Oblast | Magadan | GDX | 387,663 | ▲2.9% | ▼4 |
| 54 | Baikal International Airport | Buryatia | Ulan-Ude | UUD | 376,774 | ▲39.7% | ▲6 |
| 55 | Sabetta International Airport | Tyumen Oblast; Yamalo-Nenets Autonomous Okrug | Sabetta | SBT | 369,819(2017) | ▲54.3% | ▼5 |
| 56 | Izhevsk Airport | Udmurtia | Izhevsk | IJK | 352,412 | ▲11.6% | ▼1 |
| 57 | Mirny Airport | Sakha Republic | Mirny | MJZ | 342,197 | ▲3.9% | ▼3 |
| 58 | Talakan Airport | Sakha Republic | Vitim | TLK | 300,000 | ▲13.0% | ▲3 |
| 59 | Salekhard Airport | Tyumen Oblast; Yamalo-Nenets Autonomous Okrug | Salekhard | SLY | 298,104(2017) | ▲1.6% | ▼3 |
| 60 | Gelendzhik Airport | Krasnodar Krai | Gelendzhik | GDZ | 294,533 | ▼ −0.1% | ▼3 |
| 61 | Khanty-Mansiysk Airport | Tyumen Oblast; Khanty-Mansi Autonomous Okrug | Khanty-Mansiysk | HMA | 291,182 | ▲14.4% | ▲1 |
| 62 | Igarka Airport | Krasnoyarsk Krai | Igarka | IAA | 278,039(2017) | ▲29.7% | ▼3 |
| 63 | Magas Airport | Ingushetia | Nazran | IGT | 270,200 | ▲16.7% | ▲1 |
| 64 | Cheboksary Airport | Chuvashia | Cheboksary | CSY | 270,000 | ▲7.2% | Steady |
| 65 | Spichenkovo Airport | Kemerovo Oblast | Novokuznetsk | NOZ | 246,801 | ▲5.3% | ▲2 |
| 66 | Magnitogorsk Airport | Bashkortostan; Chelyabinsk Oblast | Magnitogorsk | MQF | 236,749 | ▲51.3% | ▲4 |
| 67 | Abakan Airport | Khakassia | Abakan | ABA | 197,222 | ▲6.5% | ▲3 |
| 68 | Noyabrsk Airport | Tyumen Oblast; Yamalo-Nenets Autonomous Okrug | Noyabrsk | NOJ | 196,191 | ▼ −6.3% | Steady |
| 69 | Nadym Airport | Tyumen Oblast; Yamalo-Nenets Autonomous Okrug | Nadym | NYM | 186,769 | ▲10.3% | ▲3 |
| 70 | Naryan-Mar Airport | Arkhangelsk Oblast; Nenets Autonomous Okrug | Naryan-Mar | NNM | 183,127(2017) | ▼ −9.7% | ▲1 |
| 71 | Penza Airport | Penza Oblast | Penza | PEZ | 181,000 | ▲18.4% | ▲4 |
| 72 | Ulyanovsk Vostochny Airport | Ulyanovsk Oblast | Ulyanovsk | ULY | 167,170 | ▼ −28.9% | ▼8 |
| 73 | Usinsk Airport | Komi Republic | Usinsk | USK | 158,657(2017) | ▼ −2.2% | ▲1 |
| 74 | Cherepovets Airport | Vologda Oblast | Cherepovets | CEE | 149,068(2017) | ▲4.7% | ▲2 |
| 75 | Bovanenkovo Airport | Tyumen Oblast; Yamalo-Nenets Autonomous Okrug | Bovanenkovo | BVJ | 146,600 | ▲13.8% | ▲2 |
| 76 | Kogalym Airport | Tyumen Oblast; Khanty-Mansi Autonomous Okrug | Kogalym | KGP | 136,052 | ▲6.8% | ▲2 |
| 77 | Bratsk Airport | Irkutsk Oblast | Bratsk | BTK | 135,321 | ▲9.9% | ▲2 |
| 78 | Nalchik Airport | Kabardino-Balkaria | Nalchik | NAL | 135,000 | ▼ −43.0% | ▼14 |
| 79 | Pobedilovo Airport | Kirov Oblast | Kirov | KVX | 128,272 | ▼ −22.8% | ▼6 |
| 80 | Chulman Airport | Sakha Republic | Neryungri | NER | 115,336(2017) | ▲37.8% | Steady |
| 81 | Ugolny Airport | Chukotka Autonomous Okrug | Anadyr | DYR | 102,806 | ▲7.6% | Steady |
| 82 | Kaluga Airport | Kaluga Oblast | Kaluga | KLF | 100,000 | ▲451.1% | ▲47 |

== Russia's busiest airports by passenger traffic in 2017 ==
Includes airports with total traffic over 100,000 passengers. Source: Russian Federal Air Transport Agency (see also provisional 2018 statistics)

| Rank | Airport | Region | City | IATA code | Passengers 2017 | Annual growth | Rank change 2016–2017 |
|---|---|---|---|---|---|---|---|
| 1 | Sheremetyevo International Airport | Moscow; Moscow Oblast | Moscow | SVO | 39,641,443 | ▲17.8% | Steady |
| 2 | Domodedovo International Airport | Moscow; Moscow Oblast | Moscow | DME | 30,657,854 | ▲7.6% | Steady |
| 3 | Vnukovo International Airport | Moscow | Moscow | VKO | 18,138,865 | ▲30.1% | Steady |
| 4 | Pulkovo Airport | Saint Petersburg; Leningrad Oblast | Saint Petersburg | LED | 16,125,520 | ▲21.6% | Steady |
| 5 | Sochi International Airport | Krasnodar Krai | Sochi | AER | 5,681,974 | ▲8.3% | Steady |
| 6 | Koltsovo Airport | Sverdlovsk Oblast | Yekaterinburg | SVX | 5,277,434 | ▲25.4% | ▲1 |
| 7 | Simferopol International Airport | (Republic of Crimea (Russia)) Republic of Crimea | Simferopol | SIP | 5,128,743 | ▼ −1.4% | ▼1 |
| 8 | Tolmachevo Airport | Novosibirsk Oblast | Novosibirsk | OVB | 4,809,605 | ▲22.3% | Steady |
| 9 | Pashkovsky Airport | Krasnodar Krai | Krasnodar | KRR | 3,494,987 | ▲16.8% | Steady |
| 10 | Ufa International Airport | Bashkortostan | Ufa | UFA | 2,794,407 | ▲21.7% | Steady |
| 11 | Rostov-on-Don Airport + Platov International Airport | Rostov Oblast | Rostov on Don | ROV | 2,719,518 | ▲29.9% | Steady |
| 12 | Kurumoch International Airport | Samara Oblast | Samara | KUF | 2,631,729 | ▲26.3% | Steady |
| 13 | Kazan International Airport | Tatarstan | Kazan | KZN | 2,623,423 | ▲37.1% | Steady |
| 14 | Yemelyanovo Airport | Krasnoyarsk Krai | Krasnoyarsk | KJA | 2,258,634 | ▲25.7% | ▲2 |
| 15 | Mineralnye Vody Airport | Stavropol Krai | Mineralnye Vody | MRV | 2,180,178 | ▲26.6% | ▲2 |
| 16 | Vladivostok International Airport | Primorsky Krai | Vladivostok | VVO | 2,171,922 | ▲18.8% | ▼1 |
| 17 | Khabarovsk Novy Airport | Khabarovsk Krai | Khabarovsk | KHV | 2,047,092 | ▲14.0% | ▼3 |
| 18 | Irkutsk Airport | Irkutsk Oblast | Irkutsk | IKT | 1,973,584 | ▲19.4% | Steady |
| 19 | Roschino International Airport | Tyumen Oblast | Tyumen | TJM | 1,822,909 | ▲20.1% | ▲1 |
| 20 | Khrabrovo Airport | Kaliningrad Oblast | Kaliningrad | KGD | 1,788,097 | ▲13.8% | ▼1 |
| 21 | Surgut Airport | Tyumen Oblast; Khanty-Mansi Autonomous Okrug | Surgut | SGC | 1,721,044 | ▲16.1% | Steady |
| 22 | Balandino Airport | Chelyabinsk Oblast | Chelyabinsk | CEK | 1,469,769 | ▲23.6% | ▲1 |
| 23 | Vityazevo Airport | Krasnodar Krai | Anapa | AAQ | 1,362,793 | ▼ −3.9% | ▼1 |
| 24 | Bolshoye Savino Airport | Perm Krai | Perm | PEE | 1,338,373 | ▲19.0% | Steady |
| 25 | Uytash Airport | Dagestan | Makhachkala | MCX | 1,067,684 | ▲22.8% | ▲3 |
| 26 | Volgograd International Airport | Volgograd Oblast | Volgograd | VOG | 1,013,823 | ▲24.9% | ▲4 |
| 27 | Yuzhno-Sakhalinsk Airport | Sakhalin Oblast | Yuzhno-Sakhalinsk | UUS | 985,211 | ▲4.5% | ▼2 |
| 28 | Strigino Airport | Nizhny Novgorod Oblast | Nizhny Novgorod | GOJ | 961,491 | ▲24.0% | ▲3 |
| 29 | Omsk Tsentralny Airport | Omsk Oblast | Omsk | OMS | 948,248 | ▲15.6% | Steady |
| 30 | Novy Urengoy Airport | Tyumen Oblast; Yamalo-Nenets Autonomous Okrug | Novy Urengoy | NUX | 937,628 | ▲4.6% | ▼4 |
| 31 | Yakutsk Airport | Sakha Republic | Yakutsk | YKS | 902,463 | ▲3.0% | ▼4 |
| 32 | Talagi Airport | Arkhangelsk Oblast | Arkhangelsk | ARH | 891,867 | ▲22.2% | ▲1 |
| 33 | Murmansk Airport | Murmansk Oblast | Murmansk | MMK | 845,928 | ▲10.8% | ▼1 |
| 34 | Orenburg Tsentralny Airport | Orenburg Oblast | Orenburg | REN | 744,303 | ▲52.8% | ▲5 |
| 35 | Nizhnevartovsk Airport | Tyumen Oblast; Khanty-Mansi Autonomous Okrug | Nizhnevartovsk | NJC | 669,872 | ▲8.2% | ▼1 |
| 36 | Yelizovo Airport | Kamchatka Krai | Petropavlovsk-Kamchatsky | PKC | 658,689 | ▲6.6% | ▼1 |
| 37 | Bogashevo Airport | Tomsk Oblast | Tomsk | TOF | 617,717 | ▲14.1% | ▼1 |
| 38 | Chertovitskoye Airport | Voronezh Oblast | Voronezh | VOZ | 606,289 | ▲39.8% | ▲3 |
| 39 | Begishevo Airport | Tatarstan | Naberezhnye Chelny | NBC | 587,361 | ▲56.0% | ▲5 |
| 40 | Narimanovo Airport | Astrakhan Oblast | Astrakhan | ASF | 580,910 | ▲10.8% | ▼3 |
| 41 | Barnaul Airport | Altai Krai | Barnaul | BAX | 512,317 | ▲32.9% | ▲2 |
| 42 | Syktyvkar Airport | Komi Republic | Syktyvkar | SCW | 511,582 | ▲13.9% | ▼2 |
| 43 | Saratov Tsentralny Airport | Saratov Oblast | Saratov | RTW | 481,503 | ▲11.1% | ▼1 |
| 44 | Belgorod Airport | Belgorod Oblast | Belgorod | EGO | 468,773 | ▲35.3% | ▲3 |
| 45 | Alykel Airport | Krasnoyarsk Krai | Norilsk | NSK | 461,723 | ▼ −10.3% | ▼7 |
| 46 | Zhukovsky International Airport | Moscow; Moscow Oblast | Moscow | ZIA | 425,500 | ▲870% | ▲51 |
| 47 | Ignatyevo Airport | Amur Oblast | Blagoveshchensk | BQS | 398,705 | ▲25.0% | ▲3 |
| 48 | Kemerovo Airport | Kemerovo Oblast | Kemerovo | KEJ | 398,026 | ▲48.5% | ▲6 |
| 49 | Sokol Airport | Magadan Oblast | Magadan | GDX | 376,794 | ▲8.5% | ▼3 |
| 50 | Sabetta International Airport | Tyumen Oblast; Yamalo-Nenets Autonomous Okrug | Sabetta | SBT | 369,819 | ▲54.3% | ▲7 |
| 51 | Kadala Airport | Zabaykalsky Krai | Chita | HTA | 358,674 | ▲12.6% | ▼2 |
| 52 | Stavropol Airport | Stavropol Krai | Stavropol | STW | 356,210 | ▲8.6% | ▼4 |
| 53 | Beslan Airport | North Ossetia–Alania | Vladikavkaz | OGZ | 349,684 | ▼ −5.3% | ▼8 |
| 54 | Mirny Airport | Sakha Republic | Mirny | MJZ | 329,446 | ▲13.1% | ▼2 |
| 55 | Izhevsk Airport | Udmurtia | Izhevsk | IJK | 315,557 | ▲22.8% | Steady |
| 56 | Salekhard Airport | Tyumen Oblast; Yamalo-Nenets Autonomous Okrug | Salekhard | SLY | 298,104 | ▲1.6% | ▼5 |
| 57 | Gelendzhik Airport | Krasnodar Krai | Gelendzhik | GDZ | 294,865 | ▲8.1% | ▼4 |
| 58 | Grozny Airport | Chechnya | Grozny | GRV | 283,202 | ▲36.3% | ▲3 |
| 59 | Igarka Airport | Krasnoyarsk Krai | Igarka | IAA | 278,039 | ▲29.7% | ▲1 |
| 60 | Baikal International Airport | Buryatia | Ulan-Ude | UUD | 259,585 | ▲10.5% | ▼4 |
| 61 | Talakan Airport | Sakha Republic | Vitim | TLK | 265,485 | ▲18.8% | ▼2 |
| 62 | Khanty-Mansiysk Airport | Tyumen Oblast; Khanty-Mansi Autonomous Okrug | Khanty-Mansiysk | HMA | 254,537 | ▲16.0% | ▼4 |
| 63 | Cheboksary Airport | Chuvashia | Cheboksary | CSY | 251,780 | ▲52.7% | ▲7 |
| 64 | Nalchik Airport | Kabardino-Balkaria | Nalchik | NAL | 236,865 | ▲22.0% | ▲2 |
| 65 | Ulyanovsk Vostochny Airport | Ulyanovsk Oblast | Ulyanovsk | ULY | 235,212 | ▲58.7% | ▲7 |
| 66 | Spichenkovo Airport | Kemerovo Oblast | Novokuznetsk | NOZ | 234,409 | ▲24.4% | ▲1 |
| 67 | Magas Airport | Ingushetia | Nazran | IGT | 231,633 | ▲12.5% | ▼5 |
| 68 | Noyabrsk Airport | Tyumen Oblast; Yamalo-Nenets Autonomous Okrug | Noyabrsk | NOJ | 209,479 | ▲4.2% | ▼4 |
| 69 | Magnitogorsk Airport | Bashkortostan; Chelyabinsk Oblast | Magnitogorsk | MQF | 193,175 | ▲51.3% | ▲5 |
| 70 | Abakan Airport | Khakassia | Abakan | ABA | 185,185 | ▲2.2% | ▼2 |
| 71 | Naryan-Mar Airport | Arkhangelsk Oblast; Nenets Autonomous Okrug | Naryan-Mar | NNM | 183,127 | ▼ −9.7% | ▼8 |
| 72 | Nadym Airport | Tyumen Oblast; Yamalo-Nenets Autonomous Okrug | Nadym | NYM | 169,313 | ▲3.7% | ▼3 |
| 73 | Pobedilovo Airport | Kirov Oblast | Kirov | KVX | 166,160 | ▼ −16.2% | ▼8 |
| 74 | Usinsk Airport | Komi Republic | Usinsk | USK | 158,657 | ▼ −2.2% | ▼3 |
| 75 | Penza Airport | Penza Oblast | Penza | PEZ | 152,881 | ▲44.2% | ▲2 |
| 76 | Cherepovets Airport | Vologda Oblast | Cherepovets | CEE | 149,068 | ▲4.7% | ▼3 |
| 77 | Bovanenkovo Airport | Tyumen Oblast; Yamalo-Nenets Autonomous Okrug | Bovanenkovo | BVJ | 128,812 | ▲28.5% | ▲1 |
| 78 | Kogalym Airport | Tyumen Oblast; Khanty-Mansi Autonomous Okrug | Kogalym | KGP | 127,382 | ▲8.4% | ▼2 |
| 79 | Bratsk Airport | Irkutsk Oblast | Bratsk | BTK | 115,548 | ▲4.4% | ▼4 |
| 80 | Chulman Airport | Sakha Republic | Neryungri | NER | 115,336 | ▲37.8% | ▲2 |

== Russia's busiest airports by passenger traffic in 2016 ==
The airports with total traffic more than 100,000 passengers. Source: Federal Air Transport Agency

| Rank | Airport | Region | City | IATA code | Passengers 2016 | Annual growth | Rank change 2015-2016 |
|---|---|---|---|---|---|---|---|
| 1 | Sheremetyevo International Airport | Moscow; Moscow Oblast | Moscow | SVO | 33,679,052 | ▲7.6% | Steady |
| 2 | Domodedovo International Airport | Moscow; Moscow Oblast | Moscow | DME | 28,537,243 | ▼6.6% | Steady |
| 3 | Vnukovo International Airport | Moscow | Moscow | VKO | 14,012,058 | ▼11.6% | Steady |
| 4 | Pulkovo Airport | (Saint Petersburg) Saint Petersburg; Leningrad Oblast | Saint Petersburg | LED | 13,265,037 | ▼1.8% | Steady |
| 5 | Sochi International Airport | Krasnodar Krai | Sochi | AER | 5,262,754 | ▲28.7% | ▲2 |
| 6 | Simferopol International Airport | (Republic of Crimea (Russia)) Republic of Crimea | Simferopol | SIP | 5,201,690 | ▲3.7% | ▼1 |
| 7 | Koltsovo Airport | Sverdlovsk Oblast | Yekaterinburg | SVX | 4,300,738 | ▲1.2% | ▼1 |
| 8 | Tolmachevo Airport | Novosibirsk Oblast | Novosibirsk | OVB | 4,097,566 | ▲10.6% | Steady |
| 9 | Pashkovsky Airport | Krasnodar Krai | Krasnodar | KRR | 3,002,121 | ▼4.0% | Steady |
| 10 | Ufa International Airport | Bashkortostan | Ufa | UFA | 2,318,434 | ▲0,2% | Steady |
| 11 | Rostov-on-Don Airport | Rostov Oblast | Rostov on Don | ROV | 2,094,953 | ▲1.6% | ▲1 |
| 12 | Kurumoch International Airport | Samara Oblast | Samara | KUF | 2,091,818 | ▼5.3% | ▼1 |
| 13 | Kazan International Airport | Tatarstan | Kazan | KZN | 1,923,223 | ▲6.9% | ▲3 |
| 14 | Khabarovsk Novy Airport | Khabarovsk Krai | Khabarovsk | KHV | 1,869,096 | ▲2.6% | Steady |
| 15 | Vladivostok International Airport | Primorsky Krai | Vladivostok | VVO | 1,850,311 | ▲9.0% | ▲2 |
| 16 | Yemelyanovo Airport | Krasnoyarsk Krai | Krasnoyarsk | KJA | 1,822,877 | ▲1.0% | ▼1 |
| 17 | Mineralnye Vody Airport | Stavropol Krai | Mineralnye Vody | MRV | 1,731,558 | ▼11.9% | ▼4 |
| 18 | Irkutsk Airport | Irkutsk Oblast | Irkutsk | IKT | 1,708,894 | ▲0.9% | Steady |
| 19 | Khrabrovo Airport | Kaliningrad Oblast | Kaliningrad | KGD | 1,570,854 | ▲1.8% | Steady |
| 20 | Roschino International Airport | Tyumen Oblast | Tyumen | TJM | 1,530,549 | ▲8.7% | ▲1 |
| 21 | Surgut Airport | (Tyumen Oblast) Tyumen Oblast; Khanty-Mansi Autonomous Okrug | Surgut | SGC | 1,489,395 | ▲4.0% | ▼1 |
| 22 | Vityazevo Airport | Krasnodar Krai | Anapa | AAQ | 1,418,454 | ▲20.2% | ▲2 |
| 23 | Balandino Airport | Chelyabinsk Oblast | Chelyabinsk | CEK | 1,225,902 | ▼1.1% | Steady |
| 24 | Bolshoye Savino Airport | Perm Krai | Perm | PEE | 1,131,844 | ▼12.1% | ▼2 |
| 25 | Yuzhno-Sakhalinsk Airport | Sakhalin Oblast | Yuzhno-Sakhalinsk | UUS | 942,778 | ▲11.0% | ▲5 |
| 26 | Novy Urengoy Airport | (Tyumen Oblast) Tyumen Oblast; Yamalo-Nenets Autonomous Okrug | Novy Urengoy | NUX | 899,429 | ▲2.9% | ▲2 |
| 27 | Yakutsk Airport | Sakha Republic | Yakutsk | YKS | 877,580 | ▲0.6% | ▲2 |
| 28 | Uytash Airport | Dagestan | Makhachkala | MCX | 869,471 | ▲23.0% | ▲5 |
| 29 | Omsk Tsentralny Airport | Omsk Oblast | Omsk | OMS | 830,549 | ▼6.4% | ▼2 |
| 30 | Volgograd International Airport | Volgograd Oblast | Volgograd | VOG | 811,606 | ▼10.0% | ▼4 |
| 31 | Strigino Airport | Nizhny Novgorod Oblast | Nizhny Novgorod | GOJ | 779,709 | ▼18.1% | ▼6 |
| 32 | Murmansk Airport | Murmansk Oblast | Murmansk | MMK | 763,668 | ▲1.5% | Steady |
| 33 | Talagi Airport | Arkhangelsk Oblast | Arkhangelsk | ARH | 734,373 | ▼8.4% | ▼2 |
| 34 | Nizhnevartovsk Airport | (Tyumen Oblast) Tyumen Oblast; Khanty-Mansi Autonomous Okrug | Nizhnevartovsk | NJC | 631,871 | ▼6.4% | Steady |
| 35 | Yelizovo Airport | Kamchatka Krai | Petropavlovsk-Kamchatsky | PKC | 618,314 | ▲2.5% | ▲1 |
| 36 | Bogashevo Airport | Tomsk Oblast | Tomsk | TOF | 553,470 | ▲8.3% | ▲2 |
| 37 | Narimanovo Airport | Astrakhan Oblast | Astrakhan | ASF | 525,363 | ▼4.5% | Steady |
| 38 | Alykel Airport | Krasnoyarsk Krai | Norilsk | NSK | 515,764 | ▲3.3% | ▲1 |
| 39 | Orenburg Tsentralny Airport | Orenburg Oblast | Orenburg | REN | 487,191 | ▼22.7% | ▼4 |
| 40 | Syktyvkar Airport | Komi Republic | Syktyvkar | SCW | 451,187 | ▼1.8% | ▲2 |
| 41 | Chertovitskoye Airport | Voronezh Oblast | Voronezh | VOZ | 434,386 | ▼3.5% | Steady |
| 42 | Saratov Tsentralny Airport | Saratov Oblast | Saratov | RTW | 433,385 | ▼3.7% | ▼2 |
| 43 | Barnaul Airport | Altai Krai | Barnaul | BAX | 386,967 | ▲2.4% | ▲1 |
| 44 | Begishevo Airport | Tatarstan | Naberezhnye Chelny | NBC | 380,997 | ▲3.7% | ▲1 |
| 45 | Beslan Airport | North Ossetia–Alania | Vladikavkaz | OGZ | 369,288 | ▲9.3% | ▲3 |
| 46 | Sokol Airport | Magadan Oblast | Magadan | GDX | 349,766 | ▼6.0% | ▲3 |
| 47 | Belgorod Airport | Belgorod Oblast | Belgorod | EGO | 346,469 | ▼16.9% | ▼4 |
| 48 | Stavropol Airport | Stavropol Krai | Stavropol | STW | 328,152 | ▲1.8% | ▲2 |
| 49 | Kadala Airport | Zabaykalsky Krai | Chita | HTA | 327,564 | ▲5.1% | ▲2 |
| 50 | Ignatyevo Airport | Amur Oblast | Blagoveshchensk | BQS | 323,865 | ▼10.8% | ▼4 |
| 51 | Salekhard Airport | (Tyumen Oblast) Tyumen Oblast; Yamalo-Nenets Autonomous Okrug | Salekhard | SLY | 296,294 | ▲3.6% | ▲2 |
| 52 | Mirny Airport | Sakha Republic | Mirny | MJZ | 291,410 | ▲21.9% | ▲5 |
| 53 | Gelendzhik Airport | Krasnodar Krai | Gelendzhik | GDZ | 272,864 | ▼0.5% | ▲1 |
| 54 | Kemerovo Airport | Kemerovo Oblast | Kemerovo | KEJ | 268,560 | ▼22.7% | ▼7 |
| 55 | Izhevsk Airport | Udmurtia | Izhevsk | IJK | 257,065 | ▲6.4% | ▲1 |
| 56 | Baikal International Airport | Buryatia | Ulan-Ude | UUD | 242,955 | ▼17.4% | ▼4 |
| 57 | Sabetta International Airport | (Tyumen Oblast) Tyumen Oblast; Yamalo-Nenets Autonomous Okrug | Sabetta | SBT | 239,744 | ▲87.8% | ▲14 |
| 58 | Khanty-Mansiysk Airport | (Tyumen Oblast) Tyumen Oblast; Khanty-Mansi Autonomous Okrug | Khanty-Mansiysk | HMA | 230,124 | ▼15.1% | ▼3 |
| 59 | Talakan Airport | Sakha Republic | Vitim | TLK | 223,774 | ▲13.1% | ▲3 |
| 60 | Igarka Airport | Krasnoyarsk Krai | Igarka | IAA | 215,413 | ▲11.9% | ▲3 |
| 61 | Grozny Airport | Chechnya | Grozny | GRV | 208,052 | ▲1.7% | ▼1 |
| 62 | Magas Airport | Ingushetia | Nazran | IGT | 205,843 | ▲75.6% | ▲11 |
| 63 | Naryan-Mar Airport | (Arkhangelsk Oblast) Arkhangelsk Oblast; Nenets Autonomous Okrug | Naryan-Mar | NNM | 205,017 | ▼3.9% | ▼5 |
| 64 | Noyabrsk Airport | (Tyumen Oblast) Tyumen Oblast; Yamalo-Nenets Autonomous Okrug | Noyabrsk | NOJ | 201,612 | ▼6.5% | ▼7 |
| 65 | Pobedilovo Airport | Kirov Oblast | Kirov | KVX | 198,570 | ▲58.3% | ▲6 |
| 66 | Nalchik Airport | Kabardino-Balkaria | Nalchik | NAL | 194,096 | ▲84.0% | ▲8 |
| 67 | Spichenkovo Airport | Kemerovo Oblast | Novokuznetsk | NOZ | 188,458 | ▼10.1% | ▼8 |
| 68 | Abakan Airport | Khakassia | Abakan | ABA | 184,725 | ▼4.3% | ▼6 |
| 69 | Nadym Airport | (Tyumen Oblast) Tyumen Oblast; Yamalo-Nenets Autonomous Okrug | Nadym | NYM | 169,343 | ▼2.7% | ▼2 |
| 70 | Cheboksary Airport | Chuvashia | Cheboksary | CSY | 165,159 | ▲82.5% | ▲7 |
| 71 | Usinsk Airport | Komi Republic | Usinsk | USK | 165,087 | ▼13.1% | ▼7 |
| 72 | Ulyanovsk Vostochny Airport | Ulyanovsk Oblast | Ulyanovsk | ULY | 148,543 | ▲722.3% | ▲57 |
| 73 | Cherepovets Airport | Vologda Oblast | Cherepovets | CEE | 142,378 | ▲17.2% | ▲6 |
| 74 | Magnitogorsk Airport | (Bashkortostan) Bashkortostan; Chelyabinsk Oblast | Magnitogorsk | MQF | 127,662 | ▼4.7% | ▼4 |
| 75 | Bratsk Airport | Irkutsk Oblast | Bratsk | BTK | 117,789 | ▼16.1% | ▼6 |
| 76 | Kogalym Airport | (Tyumen Oblast) Tyumen Oblast; Khanty-Mansi Autonomous Okrug | Kogalym | KGP | 117,774 | ▼1.2% | ▼3 |
| 77 | Penza Airport | Penza Oblast | Penza | PEZ | 105,991 | ▲12.7% | Steady |
| 78 | Bovanenkovo Airport | (Tyumen Oblast) Tyumen Oblast; Yamalo-Nenets Autonomous Okrug | Bovanenkovo | BVJ | 103,948 | ▲59.9% | ▲9 |

== Russia's busiest airports by passenger traffic in 2015 ==
The airports with total traffic more than 100,000 passengers. Source: Federal Agency of air transport

| Rank | Airport | Region | City | IATA code | Passengers 2015 | Annual growth | Rank change 2014-2015 |
|---|---|---|---|---|---|---|---|
| 1 | Sheremetyevo International Airport | Moscow; Moscow Oblast | Moscow | SVO | 31,302,068 | ▲0.1% | ▲1 |
| 2 | Domodedovo International Airport | Moscow; Moscow Oblast | Moscow | DME | 30,563,966 | ▼7.5% | ▼1 |
| 3 | Vnukovo International Airport | Moscow | Moscow | VKO | 15,846,428 | ▲24.5% | ▲1 |
| 4 | Pulkovo Airport | (Saint Petersburg) Saint Petersburg; Leningrad Oblast | Saint Petersburg | LED | 13,501,454 | ▼5.4% | ▼1 |
| 5 | Simferopol International Airport | (Republic of Crimea (Russia)) Republic of Crimea | Simferopol | SIP | 5,017,758 | ▲79.8% | ▲4 |
| 6 | Koltsovo Airport | Sverdlovsk Oblast | Yekaterinburg | SVX | 4,247,660 | ▼6.2% | ▼1 |
| 7 | Sochi International Airport | Krasnodar Krai | Sochi | AER | 4,089,327 | ▲31.9% | ▲1 |
| 8 | Tolmachevo Airport | Novosibirsk Oblast | Novosibirsk | OVB | 3,703,211 | ▼6.4% | ▼2 |
| 9 | Pashkovsky Airport | Krasnodar Krai | Krasnodar | KRR | 3,128,248 | ▼8.5% | ▼2 |
| 10 | Ufa International Airport | Bashkortostan | Ufa | UFA | 2,313,388 | ▼2,8% | Steady |
| 11 | Kurumoch International Airport | Samara Oblast | Samara | KUF | 2,208,129 | ▼7.1% | Steady |
| 12 | Rostov-on-Don Airport | Rostov Oblast | Rostov on Don | ROV | 2,062,855 | ▼11.9% | Steady |
| 13 | Mineralnye Vody Airport | Stavropol Krai | Mineralnye Vody | MRV | 1,966,492 | ▲2.3% | ▲3 |
| 14 | Khabarovsk Novy Airport | Khabarovsk Krai | Khabarovsk | KHV | 1,821,694 | ▼10.6% | Steady |
| 15 | Yemelyanovo Airport | Krasnoyarsk Krai | Krasnoyarsk | KJA | 1,804,821 | ▼12.6% | ▼2 |
| 16 | Kazan International Airport | Tatarstan | Kazan | KZN | 1,799,267 | ▼7.4% | ▼1 |
| 17 | Vladivostok International Airport | Primorsky Krai | Vladivostok | VVO | 1,698,178 | ▼5.2% | Steady |
| 18 | Irkutsk Airport | Irkutsk Oblast | Irkutsk | IKT | 1,694,188 | ▼1.1% | Steady |
| 19 | Khrabrovo Airport | Kaliningrad Oblast | Kaliningrad | KGD | 1,542,360 | ▲5.6% | Steady |
| 20 | Surgut Airport | (Tyumen Oblast) Tyumen Oblast; Khanty-Mansi Autonomous Okrug | Surgut | SGC | 1,432,097 | ▲5.4% | ▲2 |
| 21 | Roschino International Airport | Tyumen Oblast | Tyumen | TJM | 1,408,303 | ▲2.9% | Steady |
| 22 | Bolshoye Savino Airport | Perm Krai | Perm | PEE | 1,288,368 | ▼2.3% | ▲1 |
| 23 | Balandino Airport | Chelyabinsk Oblast | Chelyabinsk | CEK | 1,239,214 | ▼11.8% | ▼3 |
| 24 | Vityazevo Airport | Krasnodar Krai | Anapa | AAQ | 1,179,808 | ▲17.1% | ▲2 |
| 25 | Strigino Airport | Nizhny Novgorod Oblast | Nizhny Novgorod | GOJ | 952,089 | ▼15.9% | ▼1 |
| 26 | Volgograd International Airport | Volgograd Oblast | Volgograd | VOG | 901,543 | ▲19.0% | ▲5 |
| 27 | Omsk Tsentralny Airport | Omsk Oblast | Omsk | OMS | 887,610 | ▼15.1% | ▼2 |
| 28 | Novy Urengoy Airport | (Tyumen Oblast) Tyumen Oblast; Yamalo-Nenets Autonomous Okrug | Novy Urengoy | NUX | 874,403 | ▲7.2% | ▲1 |
| 29 | Yakutsk Airport | Sakha Republic | Yakutsk | YKS | 872,363 | ▲3.5% | ▼2 |
| 30 | Yuzhno-Sakhalinsk Airport | Sakhalin Oblast | Yuzhno-Sakhalinsk | UUS | 849,211 | ▼0.5% | ▼2 |
| 31 | Talagi Airport | Arkhangelsk Oblast | Arkhangelsk | ARH | 801,387 | ▲0.3% | ▼1 |
| 32 | Murmansk Airport | Murmansk Oblast | Murmansk | MMK | 752,488 | ▲12.8% | ▲1 |
| 33 | Uytash Airport | Dagestan | Makhachkala | MCX | 706,912 | ▲64.1% | ▲9 |
| 34 | Nizhnevartovsk Airport | (Tyumen Oblast) Tyumen Oblast; Khanty-Mansi Autonomous Okrug | Nizhnevartovsk | NJC | 674,772 | ▼2.8% | ▼2 |
| 35 | Orenburg Tsentralny Airport | Orenburg Oblast | Orenburg | REN | 629,910 | ▼4.8% | ▼1 |
| 36 | Yelizovo Airport | Kamchatka Krai | Petropavlovsk-Kamchatsky | PKC | 603,133 | ▼1.7% | ▼1 |
| 37 | Narimanovo Airport | Astrakhan Oblast | Astrakhan | ASF | 550,077 | ▲26.6% | ▲4 |
| 38 | Bogashevo Airport | Tomsk Oblast | Tomsk | TOF | 510,974 | ▼4.9% | ▼2 |
| 39 | Alykel Airport | Krasnoyarsk Krai | Norilsk | NSK | 499,233 | ▲4.6% | ▼1 |
| 40 | Saratov Tsentralny Airport | Saratov Oblast | Saratov | RTW | 450,172 | ▼6.6% | ▼3 |
| 41 | Chertovitskoye Airport | Voronezh Oblast | Voronezh | VOZ | 449,946 | ▲11.0% | ▲3 |
| 42 | Syktyvkar Airport | Komi Republic | Syktyvkar | SCW | 443,183 | ▼1.6% | ▼2 |
| 43 | Belgorod Airport | Belgorod Oblast | Belgorod | EGO | 416,817 | ▲5.0% | ▲2 |
| 44 | Barnaul Airport | Altai Krai | Barnaul | BAX | 378,075 | ▼2.5% | ▲2 |
| 45 | Begishevo Airport | Tatarstan | Naberezhnye Chelny | NBC | 367,553 | ▼9.8% | ▼2 |
| 46 | Ignatyevo Airport | Amur Oblast | Blagoveshchensk | BQS | 362,953 | ▲13.8% | ▲5 |
| 47 | Kemerovo Airport | Kemerovo Oblast | Kemerovo | KEJ | 347,447 | ▼25.2% | ▼8 |
| 48 | Beslan Airport | North Ossetia–Alania | Vladikavkaz | OGZ | 338,011 | ▲74.6% | ▲15 |
| 49 | Sokol Airport | Magadan Oblast | Magadan | GDX | 329,915 | ▼6.0% | ▼1 |
| 50 | Stavropol Airport | Stavropol Krai | Stavropol | STW | 322,365 | ▼6.1% | ▼1 |
| 51 | Kadala Airport | Zabaykalsky Krai | Chita | HTA | 311,654 | ▼5.4% | ▼1 |
| 52 | Baikal International Airport | Buryatia | Ulan-Ude | UUD | 294,289 | ▼5.9% | Steady |
| 53 | Salekhard Airport | (Tyumen Oblast) Tyumen Oblast; Yamalo-Nenets Autonomous Okrug | Salekhard | SLY | 286,121 | ▼21.6% | ▼6 |
| 54 | Gelendzhik Airport | Krasnodar Krai | Gelendzhik | GDZ | 274,227 | ▲16.1% | ▲2 |
| 55 | Khanty-Mansiysk Airport | (Tyumen Oblast) Tyumen Oblast; Khanty-Mansi Autonomous Okrug | Khanty-Mansiysk | HMA | 271,197 | ▼7.8% | ▼2 |
| 56 | Izhevsk Airport | Udmurtia | Izhevsk | IJK | 241,506 | ▼5.3% | ▼2 |
| 57 | Mirny Airport | Sakha Republic | Mirny | MJZ | 239,134 | ▲2.1% | Steady |
| 58 | Noyabrsk Airport | (Tyumen Oblast) Tyumen Oblast; Yamalo-Nenets Autonomous Okrug | Noyabrsk | NOJ | 215,649 | ▼6.5% | Steady |
| 59 | Naryan-Mar Airport | (Arkhangelsk Oblast) Arkhangelsk Oblast; Nenets Autonomous Okrug | Naryan-Mar | NNM | 213,337 | ▼3.9% | ▲1 |
| 60 | Spichenkovo Airport | Kemerovo Oblast | Novokuznetsk | NOZ | 209,747 | ▼8.4% | ▼1 |
| 61 | Grozny Airport | Chechnya | Grozny | GRV | 204,669 | ▼17.4% | ▼6 |
| 62 | Talakan Airport | Sakha Republic | Vitim | TLK | 197,819 | ▲4.4% | ▲2 |
| 63 | Abakan Airport | Khakassia | Abakan | ABA | 193,073 | ▼3.4% | ▼1 |
| 64 | Igarka Airport | Krasnoyarsk Krai | Igarka | IAA | 192,449 | ▼7.5% | ▼3 |
| 65 | Usinsk Airport | Komi Republic | Usinsk | USK | 190,082 | ▲12.7% | ▲2 |
| 66 | Cherepovets Airport | Vologda Oblast | Cherepovets | CEE | 189,003 | ▲68.9% | ▲5 |
| 67 | Ulyanovsk Baratayevka Airport | Ulyanovsk Oblast | Ulyanovsk | ULV | 179,929 | ▲20.7% | ▲1 |
| 68 | Nadym Airport | (Tyumen Oblast) Tyumen Oblast; Yamalo-Nenets Autonomous Okrug | Nadym | NYM | 174,082 | ▼3.1% | ▼3 |
| 69 | Bratsk Airport | Irkutsk Oblast | Bratsk | BTK | 140,425 | ▲27.2% | ▲3 |
| 70 | Magnitogorsk Airport | (Bashkortostan) Bashkortostan; Chelyabinsk Oblast | Magnitogorsk | MQF | 133,956 | ▼22.0% | ▼3 |
| 71 | Sabetta International Airport | (Tyumen Oblast) Tyumen Oblast; Yamalo-Nenets Autonomous Okrug | Sabetta | SBT | 127,657 | | ▲ |
| 72 | Pobedilovo Airport | Kirov Oblast | Kirov | KVX | 125,475 | ▲69.2% | ▲10 |
| 73 | Kogalym Airport | (Tyumen Oblast) Tyumen Oblast; Khanty-Mansi Autonomous Okrug | Kogalym | KGP | 119,193 | ▼9.6% | ▼4 |
| 74 | Magas Airport | Ingushetia | Nazran | IGT | 117,214 | ▲25.8% | ▼1 |
| 75 | Nalchik Airport | Kabardino-Balkaria | Nalchik | NAL | 105,484 | ▲26.0% | Steady |

== Russia's 50 busiest airports by passenger traffic in 2014 ==
| Rank | Airport | Region | City | IATA code | Passengers 2014 | Annual growth | Rank change 2013-2014 |
|---|---|---|---|---|---|---|---|
| 1 | Domodedovo International Airport | Moscow; Moscow Oblast | Moscow | DME | 33,039,501 | ▲7.4% | Steady |
| 2 | Sheremetyevo International Airport | Moscow; Moscow Oblast | Moscow | SVO | 31,279,508 | ▲6.8% | Steady |
| 3 | Pulkovo Airport | (Saint Petersburg) Saint Petersburg; Leningrad Oblast | Saint Petersburg | LED | 14,264,732 | ▲11.0% | Steady |
| 4 | Vnukovo International Airport | Moscow | Moscow | VKO | 12,733,118 | ▲13.9% | Steady |
| 5 | Koltsovo Airport | Sverdlovsk Oblast | Yekaterinburg | SVX | 4,526,167 | ▲5.4% | Steady |
| 6 | Tolmachevo Airport | Novosibirsk Oblast | Novosibirsk | OVB | 3,957,667 | ▲5.6% | Steady |
| 7 | Pashkovsky Airport | Krasnodar Krai | Krasnodar | KRR | 3,421,000 | ▲19.9% | Steady |
| 8 | Sochi International Airport | Krasnodar Krai | Sochi | AER | 3,099,000 | ▲27.7% | Steady |
| 9 | Ufa International Airport | Bashkortostan | Ufa | UFA | 2,380,581 | ▲7.3% | Steady |
| 10 | Kurumoch International Airport | Samara Oblast | Samara | KUF | 2,377,418 | ▲9.7% | ▲1 |
| 11 | Rostov-on-Don Airport | Rostov Oblast | Rostov on Don | ROV | 2,342,302 | ▲6.9% | ▼1 |
| 12 | Yemelyanovo Airport | Krasnoyarsk Krai | Krasnoyarsk | KJA | 2,066,020 | ▲0.1% | ▲1 |
| 13 | Khabarovsk Novy Airport | Khabarovsk Krai | Khabarovsk | KHV | 2,038,307 | ▼2.4% | ▼1 |
| 14 | Kazan International Airport | Tatarstan | Kazan | KZN | 1,942,408 | ▲5.2% | ▲1 |
| 15 | Mineralnye Vody Airport | Stavropol Krai | Mineralnye Vody | MRV | 1,921,669 | ▲30.4% | ▲2 |
| 16 | Vladivostok International Airport | Primorsky Krai | Vladivostok | VVO | 1,792,000 | ▼3.3% | ▼2 |
| 17 | Irkutsk Airport | Irkutsk Oblast | Irkutsk | IKT | 1,712,781 | ▲9.1% | ▼1 |
| 18 | Khrabrovo Airport | Kaliningrad Oblast | Kaliningrad | KGD | 1,460,054 | ▲11.1% | ▲1 |
| 19 | Balandino Airport | Chelyabinsk Oblast | Chelyabinsk | CEK | 1,404,238 | ▲16.0% | ▲2 |
| 20 | Roschino International Airport | Tyumen Oblast | Tyumen | TJM | 1,369,094 | ▼0.3% | ▼2 |
| 21 | Surgut Airport | (Tyumen Oblast) Tyumen Oblast; Khanty-Mansi Autonomous Okrug | Surgut | SGC | 1,358,983 | ▲3.6% | ▼1 |
| 22 | Bolshoye Savino Airport | Perm Krai | Perm | PEE | 1,319,253 | ▲14.6% | Steady |
| 23 | Strigino Airport | Nizhny Novgorod Oblast | Nizhny Novgorod | GOJ | 1,131,874 | ▲23.4% | ▲1 |
| 24 | Omsk Tsentralny Airport | Omsk Oblast | Omsk | OMS | 1,044,500 | ▲7.1% | ▼1 |
| 25 | Vityazevo Airport | Krasnodar Krai | Anapa | AAQ | 1,011,000 | ▲36.8% | ▲3 |
| 26 | Yakutsk Airport | Sakha Republic | Yakutsk | YKS | 870,040 | ▲3.5% | Steady |
| 27 | Yuzhno-Sakhalinsk Airport | Sakhalin Oblast | Yuzhno-Sakhalinsk | UUS | 853,671 | ▲0.1% | ▼2 |
| 28 | Novy Urengoy Airport | (Tyumen Oblast) Tyumen Oblast; Yamalo-Nenets Autonomous Okrug | Novy Urengoy | NUX | 815,679 | ▲11.4% | ▲1 |
| 29 | Talagi Airport | Arkhangelsk Oblast | Arkhangelsk | ARH | 798,872 | ▲4.7% | ▼2 |
| 30 | Volgograd International Airport | Volgograd Oblast | Volgograd | VOG | 757,748 | ▲10.1% | Steady |
| 31 | Nizhnevartovsk Airport | (Tyumen Oblast) Tyumen Oblast; Khanty-Mansi Autonomous Okrug | Nizhnevartovsk | NJC | 694,042 | ▲7.5% | Steady |
| 32 | Murmansk Airport | Murmansk Oblast | Murmansk | MMK | 667,065 | ▲8.6% | ▲1 |
| 33 | Orenburg Tsentralny Airport | Orenburg Oblast | Orenburg | REN | 661,381 | ▲15.4% | ▲1 |
| 34 | Yelizovo Airport | Kamchatka Krai | Petropavlovsk-Kamchatsky | PKC | 613,637 | ▼1.2% | ▼2 |
| 35 | Bogashevo Airport | Tomsk Oblast | Tomsk | TOF | 537,253 | ▲14.8% | ▲3 |
| 36 | Saratov Tsentralny Airport | Saratov Oblast | Saratov | RTW | 481,820 | ▲31.8% | ▲7 |
| 37 | Alykel Airport | Krasnoyarsk Krai | Norilsk | NSK | 477,216 | ▼1.7% | Steady |
| 38 | Kemerovo Airport | Kemerovo Oblast | Kemerovo | KEJ | 464,663 | ▼4.3% | ▼2 |
| 39 | Syktyvkar Airport | Komi Republic | Syktyvkar | SCW | 450,351 | ▲15.6% | ▲2 |
| 40 | Narimanovo Airport | Astrakhan Oblast | Astrakhan | ASF | 434,642 | ▲11.4% | Steady |
| 41 | Uytash Airport | Dagestan | Makhachkala | MCX | 430,773 | ▼16.1% | ▼6 |
| 42 | Begishevo Airport | Tatarstan | Naberezhnye Chelny | NBC | 407,415 | ▲22.4% | ▲4 |
| 43 | Chertovitskoye Airport | Voronezh Oblast | Voronezh | VOZ | 405,383 | ▲13.0% | ▲1 |
| 44 | Belgorod Airport | Belgorod Oblast | Belgorod | EGO | 396,932 | ▲41.5% | ▲7 |
| 45 | Barnaul Airport | Altai Krai | Barnaul | BAX | 387,770 | ▲14.8% | Steady |
| 46 | Salekhard Airport | (Tyumen Oblast) Tyumen Oblast; Yamalo-Nenets Autonomous Okrug | Salekhard | SLY | 364,780 | ▼12.2% | ▼7 |
| 47 | Sokol Airport | Magadan Oblast | Magadan | GDX | 350,850 | ▼5.2% | ▼5 |
| 48 | Stavropol Airport | Stavropol Krai | Stavropol | STW | 343,213 | ▲38.6% | ▲4 |
| 49 | Kadala Airport | Zabaykalsky Krai | Chita | HTA | 329,499 | ▲5.3% | ▼1 |
| 50 | Ignatyevo Airport | Amur Oblast | Blagoveshchensk | BQS | 318,922 | ▲0.8% | ▼3 |

== Russia's 58 busiest airports by passenger traffic in 2013 ==
| Rank | Airport | Region | City | IATA code | Passengers 2013 | Annual growth | Rank change 2012-2013 |
|---|---|---|---|---|---|---|---|
| 1 | Domodedovo International Airport | Moscow; Moscow Oblast | Moscow | DME | 30,760,000 | ▲9.2% | Steady |
| 2 | Sheremetyevo International Airport | Moscow; Moscow Oblast | Moscow | SVO | 29,256,000 | ▲11.7% | Steady |
| 3 | Pulkovo Airport | (Saint Petersburg) Saint Petersburg; Leningrad Oblast | Saint Petersburg | LED | 12,854,366 | ▲15.2% | Steady |
| 4 | Vnukovo International Airport | Moscow | Moscow | VKO | 11,175,116 | ▲15.2% | Steady |
| 5 | Koltsovo Airport | Sverdlovsk Oblast | Yekaterinburg | SVX | 4,293,002 | ▲13.5% | Steady |
| 6 | Tolmachevo Airport | Novosibirsk Oblast | Novosibirsk | OVB | 3,748,211 | ▲14.7% | Steady |
| 7 | Pashkovsky Airport | Krasnodar Krai | Krasnodar | KRR | 2,853,394 | ▲9.8% | Steady |
| 8 | Sochi International Airport | Krasnodar Krai | Sochi | AER | 2,427,676 | ▲14.5% | Steady |
| 9 | Ufa International Airport | Bashkortostan | Ufa | UFA | 2,218,000 | ▲15.6% | Steady |
| 10 | Rostov-on-Don Airport | Rostov Oblast | Rostov on Don | ROV | 2,190,753 | ▲16.9% | ▲3 |
| 11 | Kurumoch International Airport | Samara Oblast | Samara | KUF | 2,167,728 | ▲14.7% | Steady |
| 12 | Khabarovsk Novy Airport | Khabarovsk Krai | Khabarovsk | KHV | 2,089,097 | ▲10.9% | Steady |
| 13 | Yemelyanovo Airport | Krasnoyarsk Krai | Krasnoyarsk | KJA | 2,064,629 | ▲8.8% | ▼3 |
| 14 | Vladivostok International Airport | Primorsky Krai | Vladivostok | VVO | 1,853,000 | ▲14.1% | Steady |
| 15 | Kazan International Airport | Tatarstan | Kazan | KZN | 1,847,258 | ▲24.2% | Steady |
| 16 | Irkutsk Airport | Irkutsk Oblast | Irkutsk | IKT | 1,569,011 | ▲12.1% | Steady |
| 17 | Mineralnye Vody Airport | Stavropol Krai | Mineralnye Vody | MRV | 1,473,446 | ▲15.2% | Steady |
| 18 | Roschino International Airport | Tyumen Oblast | Tyumen | TJM | 1,372,621 | ▲10.8% | Steady |
| 19 | Khrabrovo Airport | Kaliningrad Oblast | Kaliningrad | KGD | 1,314,046 | ▲10.6% | Steady |
| 20 | Surgut Airport | (Tyumen Oblast) Tyumen Oblast; Khanty-Mansi Autonomous Okrug | Surgut | SGC | 1,311,730 | ▲12.3% | Steady |
| 21 | Balandino Airport | Chelyabinsk Oblast | Chelyabinsk | CEK | 1,210,388 | ▲20.9% | Steady |
| 22 | Bolshoye Savino Airport | Perm Krai | Perm | PEE | 1,150,929 | ▲15.8% | Steady |
| 23 | Omsk Tsentralny Airport | Omsk Oblast | Omsk | OMS | 975,184 | ▲11.8% | Steady |
| 24 | Strigino Airport | Nizhny Novgorod Oblast | Nizhny Novgorod | GOJ | 917,424 | ▲22.8% | ▲1 |
| 25 | Yuzhno-Sakhalinsk Airport | Sakhalin Oblast | Yuzhno-Sakhalinsk | UUS | 852,547 | ▲2.1% | ▼1 |
| 26 | Yakutsk Airport | Sakha Republic | Yakutsk | YKS | 840,480 | ▲12.5% | Steady |
| 27 | Talagi Airport | Arkhangelsk Oblast | Arkhangelsk | ARH | 762,916 | ▲8.4% | Steady |
| 28 | Vityazevo Airport | Krasnodar Krai | Anapa | AAQ | 739,637 | ▲26.0% | ▲3 |
| 29 | Novy Urengoy Airport | (Tyumen Oblast) Tyumen Oblast; Yamalo-Nenets Autonomous Okrug | Novy Urengoy | NUX | 732,457 | ▲15.0% | ▼1 |
| 30 | Volgograd International Airport | Volgograd Oblast | Volgograd | VOG | 687,953 | ▲21.8% | ▲2 |
| 31 | Nizhnevartovsk Airport | (Tyumen Oblast) Tyumen Oblast; Khanty-Mansi Autonomous Okrug | Nizhnevartovsk | NJC | 645,639 | ▲8.8% | ▼1 |
| 32 | Yelizovo Airport | Kamchatka Krai | Petropavlovsk-Kamchatsky | PKC | 621,137 | ▲3.9% | ▼3 |
| 33 | Murmansk Airport | Murmansk Oblast | Murmansk | MMK | 614,110 | ▲12.7% | Steady |
| 34 | Orenburg Tsentralny Airport | Orenburg Oblast | Orenburg | REN | 573,345 | ▲23.4% | ▲1 |
| 35 | Uytash Airport | Dagestan | Makhachkala | MCX | 513,549 | ▲20.0% | ▲2 |
| 36 | Kemerovo Airport | Kemerovo Oblast | Kemerovo | KEJ | 485,635 | ▲26.8% | ▲3 |
| 37 | Alykel Airport | Krasnoyarsk Krai | Norilsk | NSK | 485,521 | ▲0.2% | ▼3 |
| 38 | Bogashevo Airport | Tomsk Oblast | Tomsk | TOF | 468,000 | ▲9.8% | ▼2 |
| 39 | Salekhard Airport | (Tyumen Oblast) Tyumen Oblast; Yamalo-Nenets Autonomous Okrug | Salekhard | SLY | 415,514 | ▲14.0% | ▲2 |
| 40 | Narimanovo Airport | Astrakhan Oblast | Astrakhan | ASF | 390,188 | ▲18.9% | ▲3 |
| 41 | Syktyvkar Airport | Komi Republic | Syktyvkar | SCW | 389,516 | ▲16.1% | ▲1 |
| 42 | Sokol Airport | Magadan Oblast | Magadan | GDX | 370,118 | ▲13.9% | ▲2 |
| 43 | Saratov Tsentralny Airport | Saratov Oblast | Saratov | RTW | 365,451 | ▲33.9% | ▲5 |
| 44 | Chertovitskoye Airport | Voronezh Oblast | Voronezh | VOZ | 358,647 | ▲15.2% | ▲1 |
| 45 | Barnaul Airport | Altai Krai | Barnaul | BAX | 337,730 | ▼10.6% | ▼5 |
| 46 | Begishevo Airport | Tatarstan | Naberezhnye Chelny | NBC | 332,616 | ▲13.8% | Steady |
| 47 | Ignatyevo Airport | Amur Oblast | Blagoveshchensk | BQS | 316,468 | ▲31.1% | ▲3 |
| 48 | Kadala Airport | Zabaykalsky Krai | Chita | HTA | 313,356 | ▲30.1% | ▲3 |
| 49 | Ulan-Ude Airport | Republic of Buryatia | Ulan-Ude | UUD | 300,654 | ▲11.1% | Steady |
| 50 | Khanty-Mansiysk Airport | (Tyumen Oblast) Tyumen Oblast; Khanty-Mansi Autonomous Okrug | Khanty-Mansiysk | HMA | 291,154 | ▲5.1% | ▼3 |
| 51 | Belgorod International Airport | Belgorod Oblast | Belgorod | EGO | 280,605 | ▲41.2% | ▲5 |
| 52 | Stavropol Shpakovskoye Airport | Stavropol Krai | Stavropol | STW | 247,709 | ▲12.0% | ▲1 |
| 53 | Mirny Airport | Sakha Republic | Mirny | MJZ | 238,829 | | ▼15 |
| 54 | Noyabrsk Airport | (Tyumen Oblast) Tyumen Oblast; Yamalo-Nenets Autonomous Okrug | Noyabrsk | NOJ | 229,429 | ▲14.6% | ▲1 |
| 55 | Beslan Airport | Republic of North Ossetia–Alania | Vladikavkaz | OGZ | 226,614 | ▲10.8% | ▼2 |
| 56 | Naryan-Mar Airport | (Arkhangelsk Oblast) Arkhangelsk Oblast; Nenets Autonomous Okrug | Naryan-Mar | NNM | 211,593 | ▲7.3% | Steady |
| 57 | Igarka Airport | Krasnoyarsk Krai | Igarka | IAA | 208,682 | ▲52.2% | ▼3 |
| 58 | Gelendzhik Airport | Krasnodar Krai | Gelendzhik | GDZ | 196,690 | ▲5.0% | Steady |

== Russia's 58 busiest airports by passenger traffic in 2012 ==
| Rank | Airport | Region | City | IATA code | Passengers 2012 | Annual growth | Rank change 2011-2012 |
|---|---|---|---|---|---|---|---|
| 1 | Domodedovo International Airport | Moscow; Moscow Oblast | Moscow | DME | 28,165,657 | ▲9.7% | Steady |
| 2 | Sheremetyevo International Airport | Moscow; Moscow Oblast | Moscow | SVO | 26,188,547 | ▲16.1% | Steady |
| 3 | Pulkovo Airport | Saint Petersburg | Saint Petersburg | LED | 11,154,560 | ▲16.1% | Steady |
| 4 | Vnukovo International Airport | Moscow | Moscow | VKO | 9,699,450 | ▲18.3% | Steady |
| 5 | Koltsovo Airport | Sverdlovsk Oblast | Yekaterinburg | SVX | 3,783,069 | ▲12.7% | Steady |
| 6 | Tolmachevo Airport | Novosibirsk Oblast | Novosibirsk | OVB | 3,266,745 | ▲18.1% | Steady |
| 7 | Pashkovsky Airport | Krasnodar Krai | Krasnodar | KRR | 2,599,100 | ▲3.5% | Steady |
| 8 | Sochi International Airport | Krasnodar Krai | Sochi | AER | 2,120,400 | ▲1.6% | Steady |
| 9 | Ufa International Airport | Bashkortostan | Ufa | UFA | 1,918,945 | ▲13.6% | ▲2 |
| 10 | Yemelyanovo Airport | Krasnoyarsk Krai | Krasnoyarsk | KJA | 1,900,000 | ▲16.3% | ▲2 |
| 11 | Kurumoch International Airport | Samara Oblast | Samara | KUF | 1,890,483 | ▲8.6% | ▼2 |
| 12 | Khabarovsk Novy Airport | Khabarovsk Krai | Khabarovsk | KHV | 1,883,952 | ▲18.0% | ▲1 |
| 13 | Rostov-on-Don Airport | Rostov Oblast | Rostov on Don | ROV | 1,873,644 | ▲9.2% | ▼3 |
| 14 | Vladivostok International Airport | Primorsky Krai | Vladivostok | VVO | 1,624,000 | ▲11.5% | Steady |
| 15 | Kazan International Airport | Tatarstan | Kazan | KZN | 1,486,904 | ▲21.2% | ▲2 |
| 16 | Irkutsk Airport | Irkutsk Oblast | Irkutsk | IKT | 1,400,265 | ▲11.3% | ▼1 |
| 17 | Mineralnye Vody Airport | Stavropol Krai | Mineralnye Vody | MRV | 1,279,539 | ▲32.4% | ▲3 |
| 18 | Roschino International Airport | Tyumen Oblast | Tyumen | TJM | 1,239,348 | ▲14.3% | ▲1 |
| 19 | Khrabrovo Airport | Kaliningrad Oblast | Kaliningrad | KGD | 1,188,422 | ▼3.3% | ▼3 |
| 20 | Surgut Airport | Tyumen Oblast | Surgut | SGC | 1,167,640 | ▼2.8% | ▼2 |
| 21 | Balandino Airport | Chelyabinsk Oblast | Chelyabinsk | CEK | 1,000,753 | ▲20.0% | ▲1 |
| 22 | Bolshoye Savino Airport | Perm Krai | Perm | PEE | 994,050 | ▲13.6% | ▼1 |
| 23 | Omsk Tsentralny Airport | Omsk Oblast | Omsk | OMS | 872,224 | ▲18.9% | ▲2 |
| 24 | Yuzhno-Sakhalinsk Airport | Sakhalin Oblast | Yuzhno-Sakhalinsk | UUS | 834,960 | ▲8.0% | ▼1 |
| 25 | Strigino Airport | Nizhny Novgorod Oblast | Nizhny Novgorod | GOJ | 747,165 | ▲61.9% | ▲7 |
| 26 | Yakutsk Airport | Sakha Republic | Yakutsk | YKS | 747,130 | ▲15.1% | ▼1 |
| 27 | Talagi Airport | Arkhangelsk Oblast | Arkhangelsk | ARH | 703,759 | ▼4.3% | ▼3 |
| 28 | Novy Urengoy Airport | Tyumen Oblast | Novy Urengoy | NUX | 637,180 | ▲14.3% | Steady |
| 29 | Yelizovo Airport | Kamchatka Krai | Petropavlovsk-Kamchatsky | PKC | 597,698 | ▲8.0% | Steady |
| 30 | Nizhnevartovsk Airport | Tyumen Oblast | Nizhnevartovsk | NJC | 593,592 | ▲4.2% | ▼3 |
| 31 | Vityazevo Airport | Krasnodar Krai | Anapa | AAQ | 587,100 | ▲12.2% | ▲1 |
| 32 | Volgograd International Airport | Volgograd Oblast | Volgograd | VOG | 565,000 | ▲3.8% | ▼1 |
| 33 | Murmansk Airport | Murmansk Oblast | Murmansk | MMK | 545,073 | ▼1.0% | ▼3 |
| 34 | Alykel Airport | Krasnoyarsk Krai | Norilsk | NSK | 484,637 | ▲8.8% | ▲1 |
| 35 | Orenburg Tsentralny Airport | Orenburg Oblast | Orenburg | REN | 464,628 | ▲4.2% | ▼1 |
| 36 | Bogashevo Airport | Tomsk Oblast | Tomsk | TOF | 426,328 | ▲10.3% | |
| 37 | Uytash Airport | Dagestan | Makhachkala | MCX | 422,907 | ▲1.2% | |
| 38 | Mirny Airport | Sakha Republic | Mirny | MJZ | ~400,000?(2011) | | |
| 39 | Kemerovo Airport | Kemerovo Oblast | Kemerovo | KEJ | 383,123 | ▲4.9% | |
| 40 | Barnaul Airport | Altai Krai | Barnaul | BAX | 377,710 | ▲5.7% | |
| 41 | Salekhard Airport | Tyumen Oblast | Salekhard | SLY | 364,381 | ▲24.6% | |
| 42 | Syktyvkar Airport | Komi Republic | Syktyvkar | SCW | 335,558 | ▲7.4% | |
| 43 | Narimanovo Airport | Astrakhan Oblast | Astrakhan | ASF | 328,228 | ▼5.1% | |
| 44 | Sokol Airport | Magadan Oblast | Magadan | GDX | 325,058 | ▲14.3% | |
| 45 | Chertovitskoye Airport | Voronezh Oblast | Voronezh | VOZ | 311,280 | ▲11.4% | |
| 46 | Begishevo Airport | Tatarstan | Naberezhnye Chelny | NBC | 292,352 | ▼0.5% | |
| 47 | Khanty-Mansiysk Airport | Tyumen Oblast | Khanty-Mansiysk | HMA | 277,041 | ▲6.7% | |
| 48 | Saratov Tsentralny Airport | Saratov Oblast | Saratov | RTW | 272,835 | ▲8.5% | |
| 49 | Ulan-Ude Airport | Republic of Buryatia | Ulan-Ude | UUD | 270,554 | ▲44.1% | |
| 50 | Ignatyevo Airport | Amur Oblast | Blagoveshchensk | BQS | 241,338 | ▲29.1% | |
| 51 | Kadala Airport | Zabaykalsky Krai | Chita | HTA | 240,856 | ▲20.1% | |
| 52 | Igarka Airport | Krasnoyarsk Krai | Igarka | IAA | 226,881 | ▲52.2% | |
| 53 | Stavropol Shpakovskoye Airport | Stavropol Krai | Stavropol | STW | 220,859 | ▲25.5% | |
| 54 | Beslan Airport | Republic of North Ossetia–Alania | Vladikavkaz | OGZ | 204,548 | ▼19.7% | |
| 55 | Noyabrsk Airport | Yamalo-Nenets Autonomous Okrug | Noyabrsk | NOJ | 200,159 | ▲22.0% | |
| 56 | Belgorod International Airport | Belgorod Oblast | Belgorod | EGO | 198,697 | ▲49.4% | |
| 57 | Naryan-Mar Airport | Nenets Autonomous Okrug | Naryan-Mar | NNM | 197,233 | ▲4.3% | |
| 58 | Gelendzhik Airport | Krasnodar Krai | Gelendzhik | GDZ | 187,500 | ▼23.8% | |

== Russia's 50 busiest airports by passenger traffic in 2011 ==
| Rank | Airport | Region | City | IATA code | Passengers 2011 | Annual growth | Rank change 2010-2011 |
|---|---|---|---|---|---|---|---|
| 1 | Domodedovo International Airport | Moscow; Moscow Oblast | Moscow | DME | 25,701,610 | ▲15.5% | Steady |
| 2 | Sheremetyevo International Airport | Moscow; Moscow Oblast | Moscow | SVO | 22,555,000 | ▲16.7% | Steady |
| 3 | Pulkovo Airport | Saint Petersburg | Saint Petersburg | LED | 9,610,767 | ▲13.8% | ▲1 |
| 4 | Vnukovo International Airport | Moscow | Moscow | VKO | 8,197,162 | ▼13.5% | ▼1 |
| 5 | Koltsovo Airport | Sverdlovsk Oblast | Yekaterinburg | SVX | 3,355,883 | ▲22.1% | Steady |
| 6 | Tolmachevo Airport | Novosibirsk Oblast | Novosibirsk | OVB | 2,765,882 | ▲22.3% | Steady |
| 7 | Pashkovsky Airport | Krasnodar Krai | Krasnodar | KRR | 2,511,000 | ▲20.4% | Steady |
| 8 | Sochi International Airport | Krasnodar Krai | Sochi | AER | 2,086,000 | ▲8.6% | Steady |
| 9 | Kurumoch International Airport | Samara Oblast | Samara | KUF | 1,740,641 | ▲10.8% | Steady |
| 10 | Rostov-on-Don Airport | Rostov Oblast | Rostov on Don | ROV | 1,716,680 | ▲19.3% | ▲2 |
| 11 | Ufa International Airport | Bashkortostan | Ufa | UFA | 1,688,570 | ▲11.6% | ▼1 |
| 12 | Yemelyanovo Airport | Krasnoyarsk Krai | Krasnoyarsk | KJA | 1,633,098 | ▲28.0% | ▼1 |
| 13 | Khabarovsk Novy Airport | Khabarovsk Krai | Khabarovsk | KHV | 1,596,212 | ▲9.0% | ▼2 |
| 14 | Vladivostok International Airport | Primorsky Krai | Vladivostok | VVO | 1,457,000 | ▲15.4% | Steady |
| 15 | Irkutsk Airport | Irkutsk Oblast | Irkutsk | IKT | 1,257,804 | ▲16.6% | ▲1 |
| 16 | Khrabrovo Airport | Kaliningrad Oblast | Kaliningrad | KGD | 1,229,017 | ▲20.0% | ▲1 |
| 17 | Kazan International Airport | Tatarstan | Kazan | KZN | 1,226,762 | ▲28.0% | ▲2 |
| 18 | Surgut Airport | Tyumen Oblast | Surgut | SGC | 1,201,468 | ▲9.9% | ▼2 |
| 19 | Roschino International Airport | Tyumen Oblast | Tyumen | TJM | 1,084,419 | ▲12.0% | ▼1 |
| 20 | Mineralnye Vody Airport | Stavropol Krai | Mineralnye Vody | MRV | 966,562 | ▲8.8% | Steady |
| 21 | Bolshoye Savino Airport | Perm Krai | Perm | PEE | 874,889 | ▲16.7% | Steady |
| 22 | Balandino Airport | Chelyabinsk Oblast | Chelyabinsk | CEK | 833,786 | ▲25.5% | Steady |
| 23 | Yuzhno-Sakhalinsk Airport | Sakhalin Oblast | Yuzhno-Sakhalinsk | UUS | 773,243 | ▲3.7% | Steady |
| 24 | Talagi Airport | Arkhangelsk Oblast | Arkhangelsk | ARH | 738,185 | ▲15.2% | Steady |
| 25 | Omsk Tsentralny Airport | Omsk Oblast | Omsk | OMS | 733,656 | ▲16.5% | Steady |
| 26 | Yakutsk Airport | Sakha Republic | Yakutsk | YKS | 649,246 | ▲12.5% | Steady |
| 27 | Nizhnevartovsk Airport | Tyumen Oblast | Nizhnevartovsk | NJC | 569,840 | ▲4.9% | ▲1 |
| 28 | Novy Urengoy Airport | Tyumen Oblast | Novy Urengoy | NUX | 558,281 | ▲27.7% | Steady |
| 29 | Yelizovo Airport | Kamchatka Krai | Petropavlovsk-Kamchatsky | PKC | 553,509 | ▲7.5% | Steady |
| 30 | Murmansk Airport | Murmansk Oblast | Murmansk | MMK | 550,311 | ▲17.9% | ▲1 |
| 31 | Volgograd International Airport | Volgograd Oblast | Volgograd | VOG | 544,447 | ▲15.6% | ▼1 |
| 32 | Vityazevo Airport | Krasnodar Krai | Anapa | AAQ | 523,000 | ▼9.3% | ▼5 |
| 33 | Strigino Airport | Nizhny Novgorod Oblast | Nizhny Novgorod | GOJ | 461,424 | ▲22.5% | ▲1 |
| 34 | Orenburg Tsentralny Airport | Orenburg Oblast | Orenburg | REN | 445,995 | ▲26.9% | ▲2 |
| 35 | Alykel Airport | Krasnoyarsk Krai | Norilsk | NSK | 445,570 | ▲7.8% | ▼2 |
| 36 | Uytash Airport | Dagestan | Makhachkala | MCX | 417,793 | ▲16.7% | ▼2 |
| 37 | Mirny Airport | Sakha Republic | Mirny | MJZ | ~400,000? | ▲ ? | ? |
| 38 | Bogashevo Airport | Tomsk Oblast | Tomsk | TOF | 386,501 | ▲14.7% | Steady |
| 39 | Kemerovo Airport | Kemerovo Oblast | Kemerovo | KEJ | 365,202 | ▲13.5% | ▲1 |
| 40 | Barnaul Airport | Altai Krai | Barnaul | BAX | 357,500 | ▲12.2% | ▲1 |
| 41 | Narimanovo Airport | Astrakhan Oblast | Astrakhan | ASF | 345,689 | ▲5.5% | ▼2 |
| 42 | Syktyvkar Airport | Komi Republic | Syktyvkar | SCW | 312,446 | ▲17.0% | Steady |
| 43 | Begishevo Airport | Tatarstan | Naberezhnye Chelny | NBC | 293,890 | ▲9.4% | ▼1 |
| 44 | Salekhard Airport | Tyumen Oblast | Salekhard | SLY | 292,000 | ▲14.1% | Steady |
| 45 | Sokol Airport | Magadan Oblast | Magadan | GDX | 284,357 | ▲16.5% | Steady |
| 46 | Chertovitskoye Airport | Voronezh Oblast | Voronezh | VOZ | 279,501 | ▲32.2% | ▲2 |
| 47 | Khanty-Mansiysk Airport | Tyumen Oblast | Khanty-Mansiysk | HMA | 259,690 | ▲12.0% | ▼1 |
| 48 | Saratov Tsentralny Airport | Saratov Oblast | Saratov | RTW | 251,423 | ▲13.0% | ▼1 |
| 49 | Gelendzhik Airport | Krasnodar Krai | Gelendzhik | GDZ | 246,000 | ▲90.7% | ▲9 |
| 50 | Kadala Airport | Zabaykalsky Krai | Chita | HTA | 200,600 | ▲14.9% | ▼1 |

== Russia's 20 busiest airports by passenger traffic in 2010 ==
| Rank | Airport | Region | City | IATA code | Passengers 2010 | Annual growth | Rank change 2009-2010 |
|---|---|---|---|---|---|---|---|
| 1 | Domodedovo International Airport | Moscow/Moscow Oblast | Moscow | DME | 22,253,529 | ▲19,2% | Steady |
| 2 | Sheremetyevo International Airport | Moscow/Moscow Oblast | Moscow | SVO | 19,123,007 | ▲29,5% | Steady |
| 3 | Vnukovo International Airport | Moscow | Moscow | VKO | 9,460,292 | ▲22.4% | Steady |
| 4 | Pulkovo Airport | Saint Petersburg | Saint Petersburg | LED | 8,391,281 | ▲24.2% | Steady |
| 5 | Koltsovo Airport | Sverdlovsk Oblast | Yekaterinburg | SVX | 2,749,000 | ▲22.9% | Steady |
| 6 | Tolmachevo Airport | Novosibirsk Oblast | Novosibirsk | OVB | 2,261,630 | ▲25.3% | Steady |
| 7 | Pashkovsky Airport | Krasnodar Krai | Krasnodar | KRR | 2,086,000 | ▲32.4% | ▲1 |
| 8 | Sochi International Airport | Krasnodar Krai | Sochi | AER | 1,920,000 | ▲22.2% | ▼1 |
| 9 | Kurumoch International Airport | Samara Oblast | Samara | KUF | 1,570,911 | ▲20.2% | Steady |
| 10 | Ufa International Airport | Bashkortostan | Ufa | UFA | 1,501,000 | ▲22.3% | ▲1 |
| 11 | Khabarovsk Novy Airport | Khabarovsk Krai | Khabarovsk | KHV | 1,464,000 | ▲24.0% | ▲1 |
| 12 | Rostov-on-Don Airport | Rostov Oblast | Rostov on Don | ROV | 1,440,000 | ▲26,5% | ▲1 |
| 13 | Yemelyanovo Airport | Krasnoyarsk Krai | Krasnoyarsk | KJA | 1,275,000 | ▲33.3% | ▲1 |
| 14 | Vladivostok International Airport | Primorsky Krai | Vladivostok | VVO | 1,263,000 | ▲27.7% | ▲1 |
| 15 | Irkutsk Airport | Irkutsk Oblast | Irkutsk | IKT | 1,079,000 | ▲26.2% | ▲3 |
| 16 | Surgut Airport | Tyumen Oblast | Surgut | SGC | 1,050,000 | ▲13.5% | ▲1 |
| 17 | Khrabrovo Airport | Kaliningrad Oblast | Kaliningrad | KGD | 1,024,000 | ▼24.5% | ▼7 |
| 18 | Roschino International Airport | Tyumen Oblast | Tyumen | TJM | 997,000 | ▲4.9% | ▼2 |
| 19 | Kazan International Airport | Tatarstan | Kazan | KZN | 959,000 | ▲41.8% | ▲1 |
| 20 | Mineralnye Vody Airport | Stavropol Krai | Mineralnye Vody | MRV | 888,000 | ▲26.5% | ▼1 |

== See also ==
- List of the busiest airports in the former USSR
- List of the busiest airports in Europe
