= USDA (disambiguation) =

USDA is the United States Department of Agriculture.

USDA may also refer to:

- Union Solidarity and Development Association, a mass organisation in Myanmar
- United States Attorney, sometimes called United States District Attorneys
- U.S. Soccer Development Academy, former United States soccer league
- United Streets Dopeboyz of America, a rap group led by Young Jeezy, which also features artists such as Slick Pulla & Blood Raw
- Universal Scene Description, .usda (ASCII-encoded) file format
- The ICAO code for Sabetta International Airport in Yamalo-Nenets Autonomous Okrug, Russia
