= Bovanenkovo Airport =

Airport in Yamalo-Nenets Autonomous Okrug, Russia

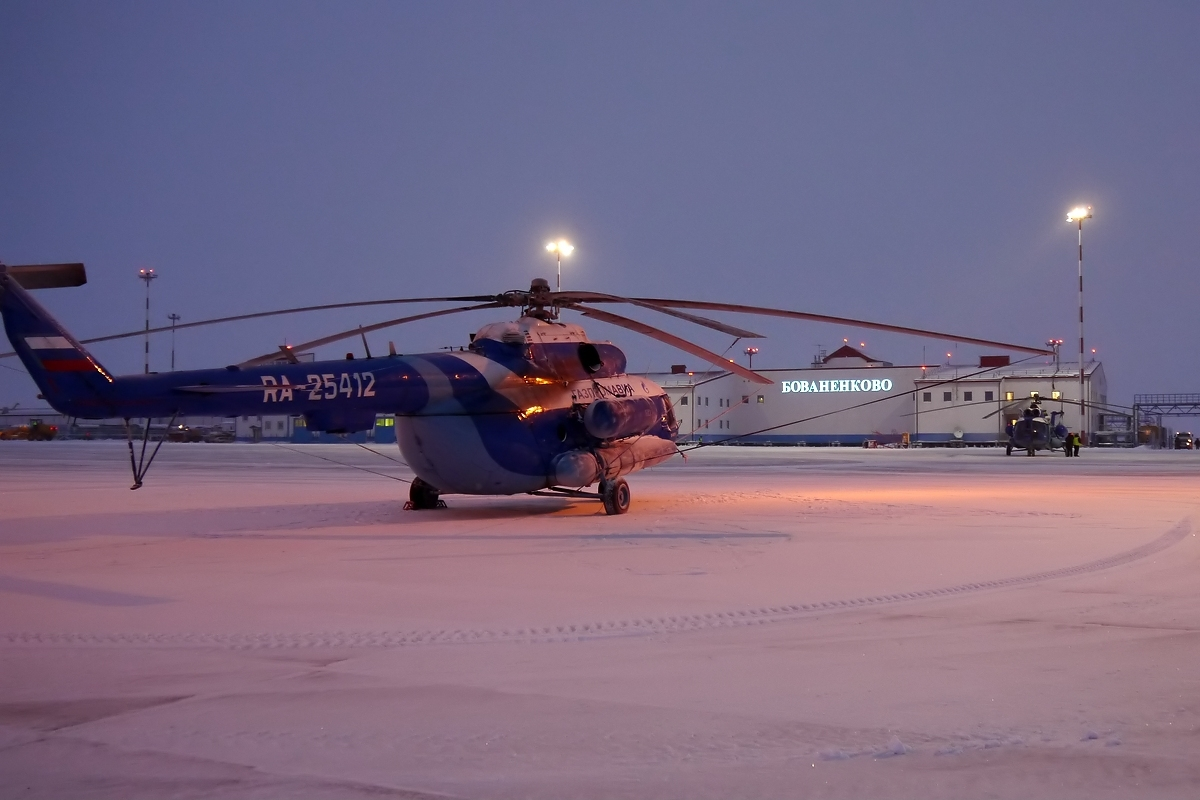
- IATA: BVJ; ICAO: USDB

Summary
- Airport type: Public
- Serves: Bovanenkovo gas field, Yamalo-Nenets Autonomous Okrug, Russia
- Elevation AMSL: 7 m / 23 ft
- Coordinates: 70°18′55″N 68°20′01″E

Maps
- Yamalo-Nenets Autonomous Okrug in Russia

- Location of the airport in Yamalo-Nenets

Runways
Direction	Length		Surface
Direction	m	ft	Surface
13/31	2,550	8,366	Concrete
- Sources: Russian Federal Air Transport Agency (see also provisional 2018 statistics)

Bovanenkovo Airport (IATA: BVJ, ICAO: USDB) is an airport in Yamalo-Nenets Autonomous Okrug, Russia, serving the Bovanenkovo gas field. It handles medium-sized airliners. The airport contains ample tarmac space and is well-maintained.

== Airlines and destinations ==
Airlines	Destinations
Aeroflot	Moscow–Sheremetyevo
Belavia	Seasonal charter: Minsk
Gazpromavia	Charter: Moscow–Vnukovo, Talakan, Tyumen, Ufa, Yekaterinburg
RusLine	Krasnoyarsk–International, Yekaterinburg
S7 Airlines	Moscow–Domodedovo; Seasonal: Novosibirsk
UVT Aero	Seasonal: Bugulma, Chelyabinsk, Kazan, Perm
Yamal Airlines	Moscow–Domodedovo, Novosibrsk, Sabetta, Saint Petersburg, Salekhard, Simferopol, Tyumen, Ufa, Yekaterinburg; Seasonal: Belgorod, Krasnodar, Omsk

== See also ==
- List of airports in Russia
