= USDD =

USDD could refer to:

- a stablecoin.
- Salekhard Airport ICAO code
- Band 71 of LTE frequency bands, which is commonly known as USDD
