= Cheboksary International Airport =

Airport in Russia

Coordinates: 56°05′24″N 47°20′50″E

Cheboksary International Airport Шупашкар ҫырӑнӑш пӗрле Аэропорт

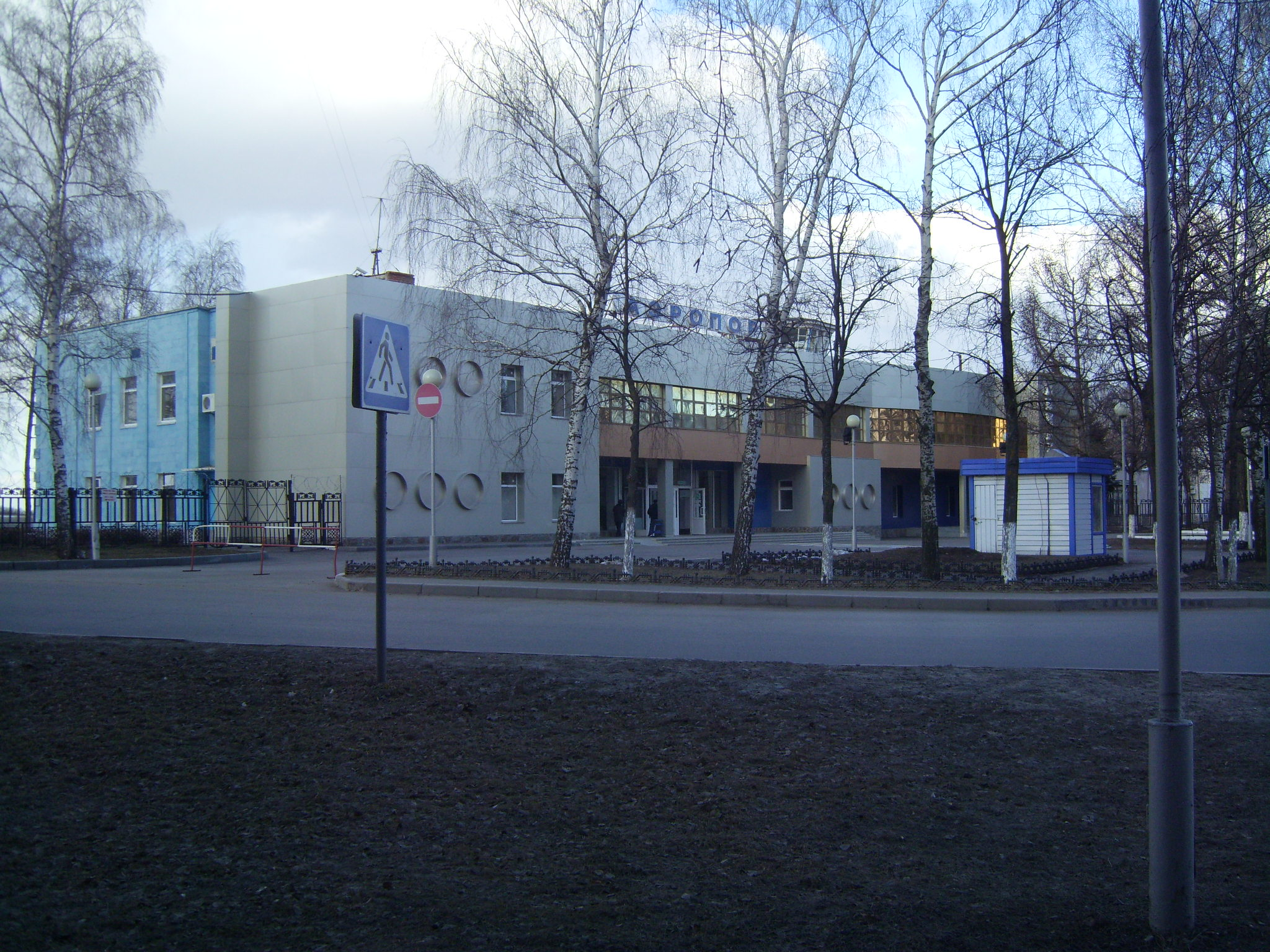
- IATA: CSY; ICAO: UWKS

Summary
- Airport type: Public
- Operator: Government
- Serves: Cheboksary
- Location: Cheboksary, Russia
- Elevation AMSL: 560 ft (170 m)
- Website: aerocheb.ru
- Interactive map of Cheboksary International Airport

Runways
Direction	Length		Surface
Direction	m	ft	Surface
06/24	2,512	8,242	Asphalt
- Source: DAFIF

Cheboksary International Airport (Chuvash: Шупашкар ҫырӑнӑш пӗрле Аэропорт, Šupaškar śırănăš pĕrle Aeroport; Russian: Международный Аэропорт Чебоксары) (IATA: CSY, ICAO: UWKS) is a small airport located 7 km (4.3 mi) southeast of Cheboksary, a city in Chuvashia, Russia. It services medium-sized airliners. In 2018, the number of passengers passing through this airport reached 270,000.

The terminal building was renovated in 2021–2024.

== Airlines and destinations ==
Airlines	Destinations
Aeroflot	Minsk, Moscow–Sheremetyevo; Seasonal: Kaliningrad, Makhachkala
Azimuth	Mineralnye Vody, Surgut
Nordwind Airlines	Sochi
Pobeda	Moscow–Sheremetyevo, Saint Petersburg
S7 Airlines	Novosibirsk

== See also ==
- List of airports in Russia
