= Penza Vissarion Belinsky Airport =

Airport in Russia

Penza Vissarion Belinsky Airport Аэропорт Пенза имени В. Г. Белинского

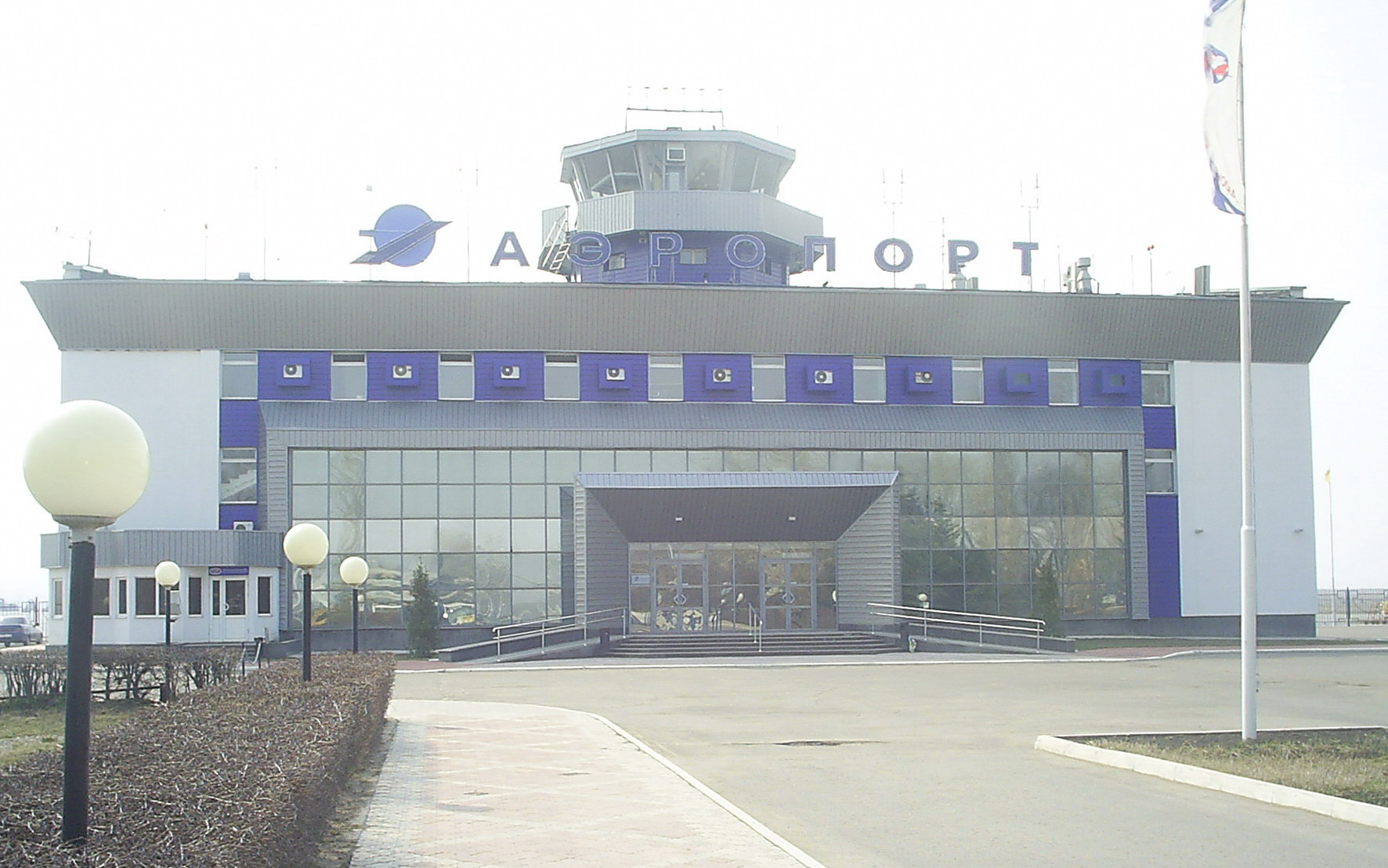
- IATA: PEZ; ICAO: UWPP

Summary
- Airport type: Public
- Operator: Penza Airport
- Serves: Penza
- Location: Penza, Russia
- Elevation AMSL: 604 ft (184 m)
- Coordinates: 53°06′44.4″N 45°00′56.7″E
- Website: airport58.ru

Map
- Location of airport in Penza Oblast

Runways
Direction	Length		Surface
Direction	ft	m	Surface
10/28	9,186	2,800	Asphalt

Statistics (2018)
- Passengers: 181,000

Penza Vissarion Belinsky Airport (IATA: PEZ, ICAO: UWPP) (also referred to as Ternovka Airport or Penza South Airport) is a small airport in Penza Oblast, Russia, located 10 km south of Penza. It is a civilian airport with modest apron space.

== History ==
Air transportation in the Penza region began in 1936. In 1939, a Civil Air Fleet airport was opened next to the village Ternovka, which accepted transit flights. The passenger terminal was built in 1963, first reconstructed partially in the 1970s and 80s, then completely in 2003. An artificial runway was built in the early 1970s. In the 1980s, during the summer vacation season, the airport received and sent more than 60 flights per day and was connected by flights to dozens of airports in the USSR, to most of the capitals of the Union republics. In the crisis 1990s, the geography of flights from Penza began to decline sharply, and by the fall of 1998 regular flights had ceased. From 1999 to 2003, the airport worked only in the summer months: regular transit flights were served from Saransk to St. Petersburg, Sochi and, in some years, to Mineralnye Vody.

In autumn 2003, the airport received a second wind: the passenger terminal was completely renovated, and regular flights to Moscow on the Yak-40 were resumed on Mondays, Wednesdays, and Fridays from mid-October. Since 2004, the frequency of flights has increased to 5 times a week: from Monday to Friday. In the summer, transit flights to Sochi and St. Petersburg continued to open every year.

== Airlines and destinations ==
Airlines	Destinations
Aeroflot	Moscow–Sheremetyevo
azimuth	Mineralnye Vody, Sochi
Rossiya Airlines	Moscow–Sheremetyevo, Saint Petersburg

== See also ==
- List of airports in Russia
