= Noyabrsk Airport =

Airport in Yamalo-Nenets Autonomous Okrug, Russia

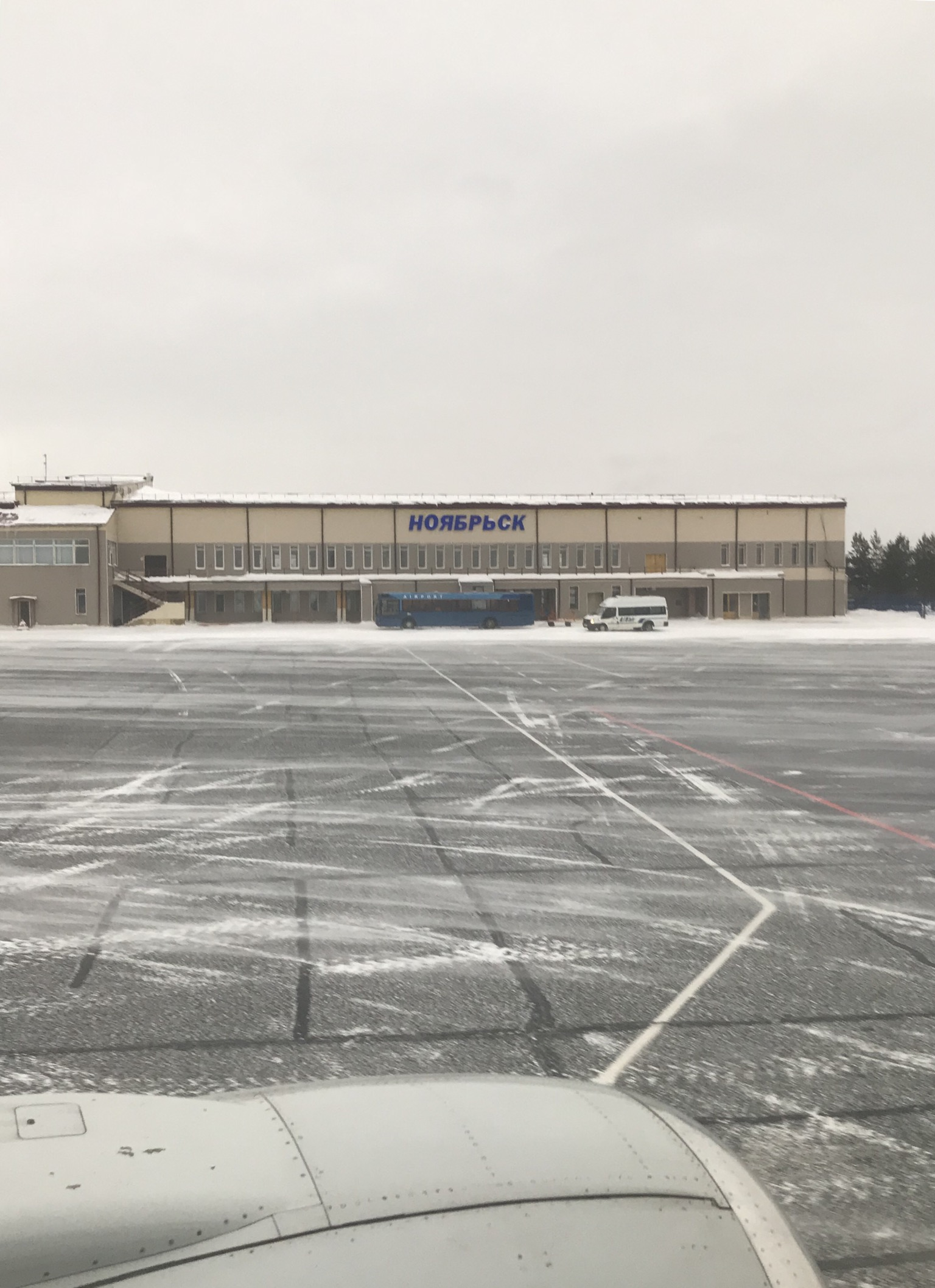
- Noyabrsk Airport
- IATA: NOJ; ICAO: USRO

Summary
- Airport type: Public
- Operator: UTair Aviation
- Serves: Noyabrsk, Russia
- Hub for: UTair Aviation
- Elevation AMSL: 136 m / 446 ft
- Coordinates: 63°11′00″N 75°16′12″E

Maps
- Yamalo-Nenets Autonomous Okrug in Russia

- Location of the airport in Yamalo-Nenets

Runways
Direction	Length		Surface
Direction	m	ft	Surface
01/19	2,509	8,232	Asphalt
- Sources: GCM, STV

Noyabrsk Airport (Russian: Аэропорт Ноябрьск) (IATA: NOJ, ICAO: USRO) is an airport in Yamalo-Nenets Autonomous Okrug, Russia located 11 km west of Noyabrsk. It handles small airliners. It serves as hub for UTair. It is a modern airport capable of landing large aircraft.

== Airlines and destinations ==
Airlines	Destinations
KrasAvia	Omsk
NordStar	Krasnoyarsk–Yemelyanovo
Red Wings Airlines	Yekaterinburg
RusLine	Yekaterinburg
S7 Airlines	Novosibirsk
Ural Airlines	Moscow-Domodedovo, Ufa
Utair	Moscow–Vnukovo; Seasonal: Novosibirsk, Sochi
UVT Aero	Bugulma, Kazan
Yamal Airlines	Moscow–Domodedovo, Omsk, Salekhard, Ufa, Yekaterinburg; Seasonal: Mineralnye Vody, Sochi

== See also ==
- List of airports in Russia
