= Beslan Airport =

Beslan Airport Аэропорт Беслӕн

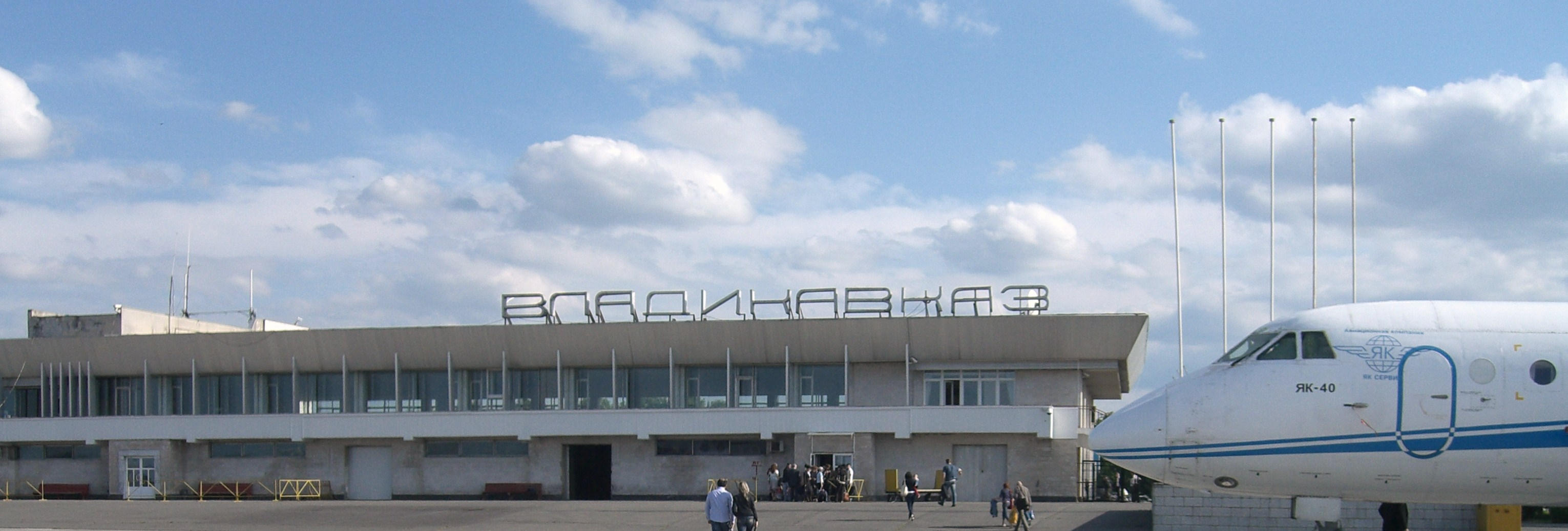
- IATA: OGZ; ICAO: URMO

Summary
- Airport type: Public
- Operator: FGUP “Vladikavkazskoye aviapredpriyatiye”
- Serves: Vladikavkaz
- Location: Beslan, Russia
- Elevation AMSL: 1,673 ft (510 m)
- Coordinates: 43°12′18″N 44°36′24″E
- Website: vladikavkazaero.ru

Map
- Location of airport in North Ossetia–Alania

Runways
Direction	Length		Surface
Direction	ft	m	Surface
09/27	9,843	3,000	Concrete

Beslan Airport (Iron Ossetic: Аэропорт Беслӕн, Russian: Аэропорт Беслан) (IATA: OGZ, ICAO: URMO), also known as Vladikavkaz International Airport (Iron Ossetic: Æхсæнадæмон аэропорт Дзæуджыхъæу, Russian: Международный аэропорт Владикавказ), is a civilian airport in North Ossetia–Alania, Russia located 5 kilometres (3.1 mi) northeast of Beslan and 15 kilometres (9.3 mi) from Vladikavkaz. It is a small airport servicing medium-sized airliners. It has parking places for five large aircraft and nine smaller ones. In 2017, 349,684 passengers transited in this airport.

The airport has two terminals, one domestic and one international. The international terminal serves occasional charter flights to Antalya (Turkey) and a few other destinations.

The airport’s operational hours are from 09h00 to 20h00 (UTC+03:00).

On 18 November 2008, the airport was certified to service the Airbus A319. This type of aircraft will replace the Tupolev Tu-154 on S7 Airlines services to Moscow-Domodedovo. The A319 is ideal for flights to Vladikavkaz because it exerts an acceptable load on the runway during takeoff and landing compared to the Boeing 737-500, which type was banned from the airport in 2007.

== Airlines and destinations ==
Airlines	Destinations
Pobeda	Antalya, Istanbul, Dubai-Al Maktoum, Moscow–Sheremetyevo, Moscow–Vnukovo, Saint Petersburg
S7 Airlines	Moscow–Domodedovo
Ural Airlines	Moscow–Domodedovo; Seasonal charter: Sharm El Sheikh
Utair	Dubai–Al Maktoum, Istanbul, Moscow–Vnukovo, Surgut

== See also ==
- List of airports in Russia
