= Spichenkovo Airport =

Airport in Russia

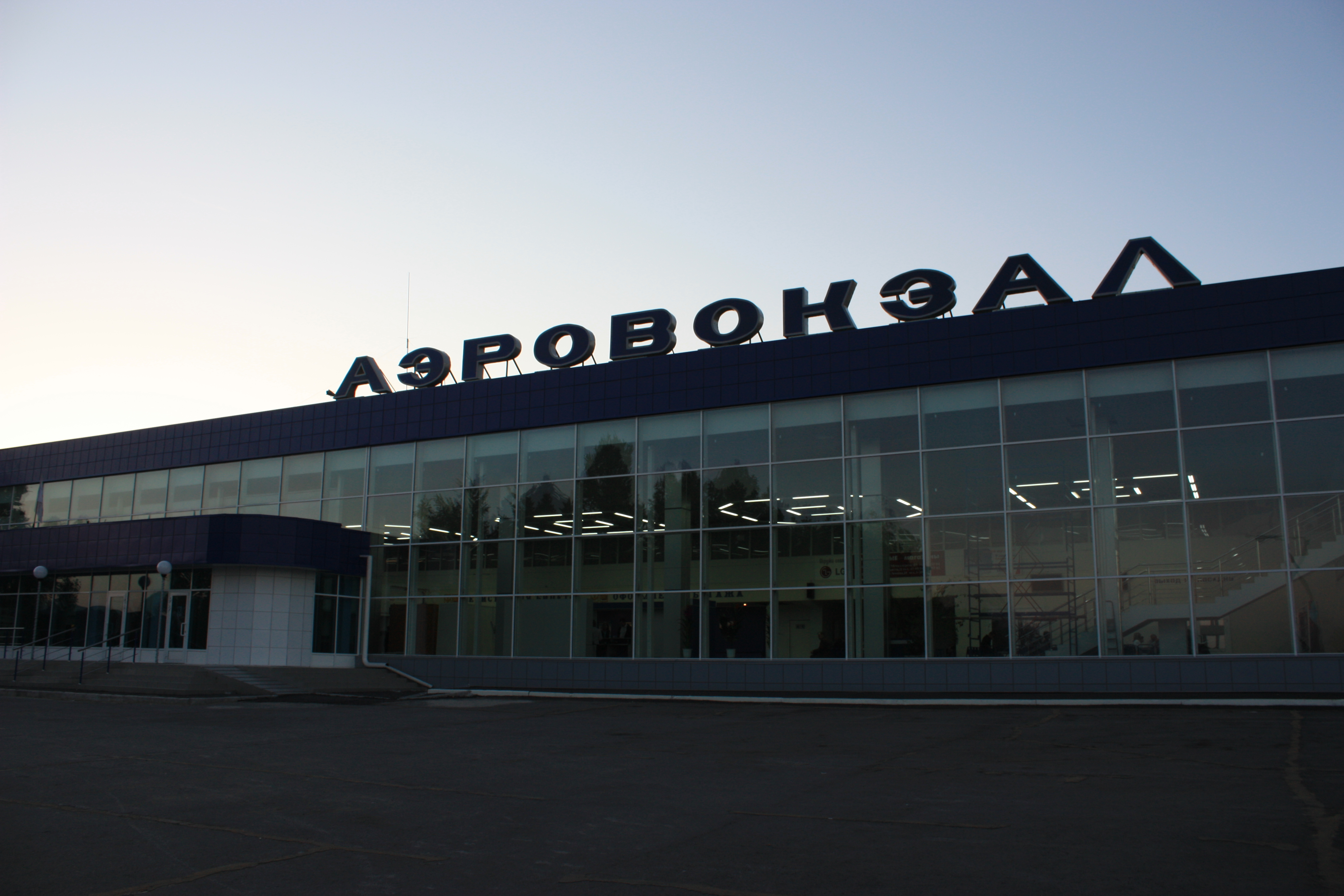
- IATA: none; ICAO: none

Summary
- Airport type: Public
- Serves: Novokuznetsk
- Location: Novokuznetsk, Russia
- Coordinates: 53°48′36″N 86°52′42″E
- Website: AeroKuz.ru

Map
- Location of airport in Kemerovo Oblast

Spichenkovo Airport (Russian: Аэропорт Спиченково) (IATA: NOZ, ICAO: UNWW), also known as Novokuznetsk Airport, is one of two major airports in Kemerovo Oblast area (Russian: Кемеровская область, Kemerovskaya oblast), Russia, Southwestern Siberia located west of Novokuznetsk. It is named after the nearby town of Spichenkovo.

== Airlines and destinations ==
Airlines	Destinations
Red Wings Airlines	Chita, Ulan-Ude, Yekaterinburg
S7 Airlines	Moscow–Domodedovo, Novosibirsk
VietJet Air	Seasonal charter: Da Nang, Nha Trang

== See also ==
- Barnaul Airport
- Kemerovo Airport
- List of airports in Russia
