= Salekhard Airport =

Airport in Salekhard, Russia

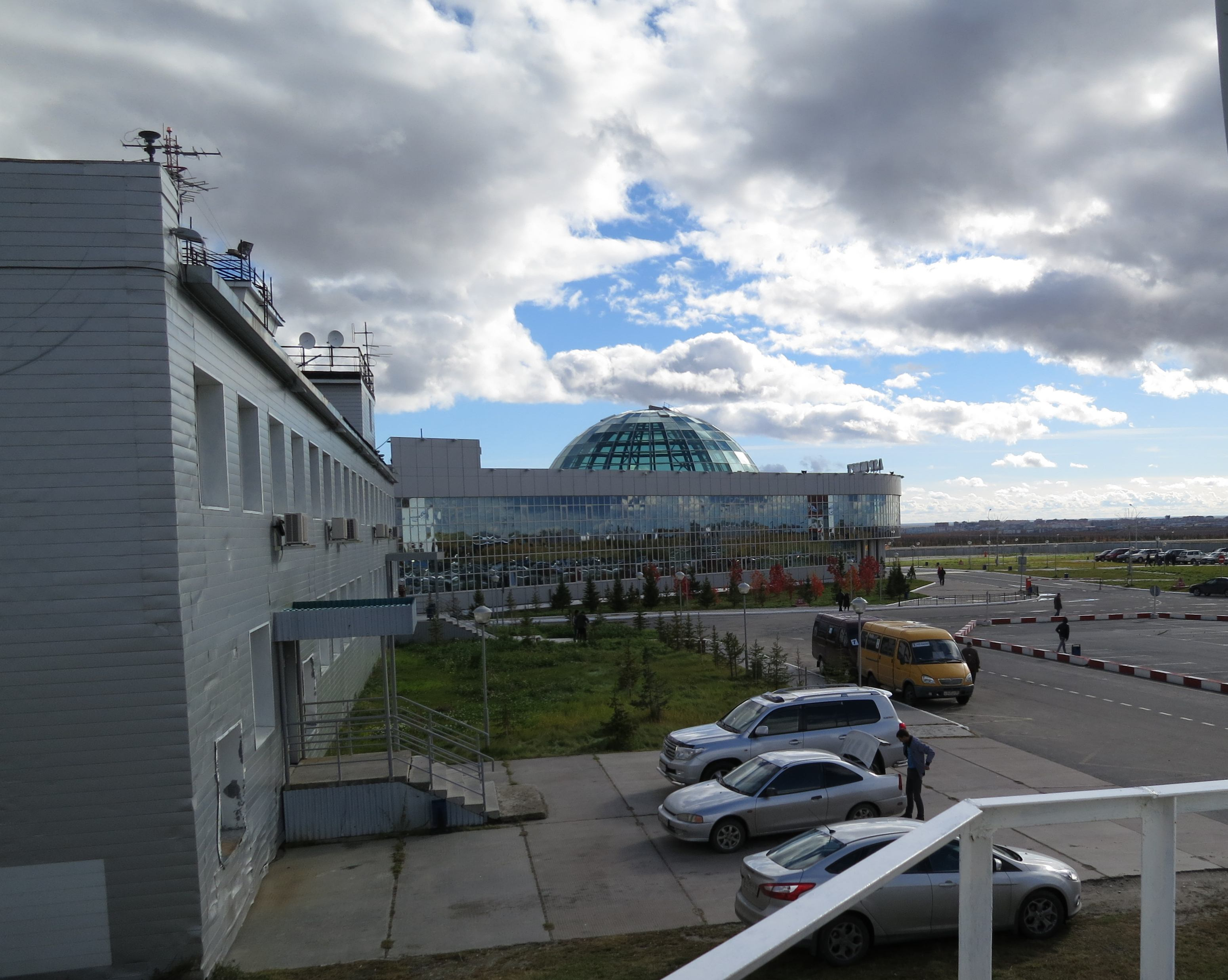
- IATA: SLY; ICAO: USDD

Summary
- Airport type: Public
- Operator: JSC "Airport Salekhard"
- Serves: Salekhard
- Location: Salekhard, Russia
- Hub for: Yamal Airlines
- Elevation AMSL: 66 m / 217 ft
- Coordinates: 66°35′21″N 66°35′44″E
- Website: APSalekhard.ru

Maps
- Yamalo-Nenets Autonomous Okrug in Russia

- Location of the airport in Yamalo-Nenets

Runways
Direction	Length		Surface
Direction	m	ft	Surface
04/22	2,718	8,917	Concrete
- Sources: GCM, STV

Salekhard Airport (IATA: SLY, ICAO: USDD) is an airport in Yamalo-Nenets Autonomous Okrug, Russia located 7 kilometres (4.3 mi) north of Salekhard. It is a civilian airfield, handling medium-sized aircraft. It is also a designated emergency airfield for commercial airliner cross-polar routes.

== Airlines and destinations ==
Airlines	Destinations
RusLine	Khanty-Mansiysk
S7 Airlines	Novosibirsk
Turukhan Airlines	Tarko-Sale
Yamal Airlines	Kazan, Mineralnye Vody, Moscow–Domodedovo, Moscow–Sheremetyevo, Novosibirsk, Novy Urengoy, Noyabrsk, Omsk, Saint Petersburg, Tyumen, Ufa, Yekaterinburg; Seasonal: Sochi

== See also ==
- List of airports in Russia
