= Sabetta International Airport =

Airport in Sabetta, Yamalo-Nenets Autonomous Okrug, Russia

Sabetta International Airport Международный аэропорт Сабетта
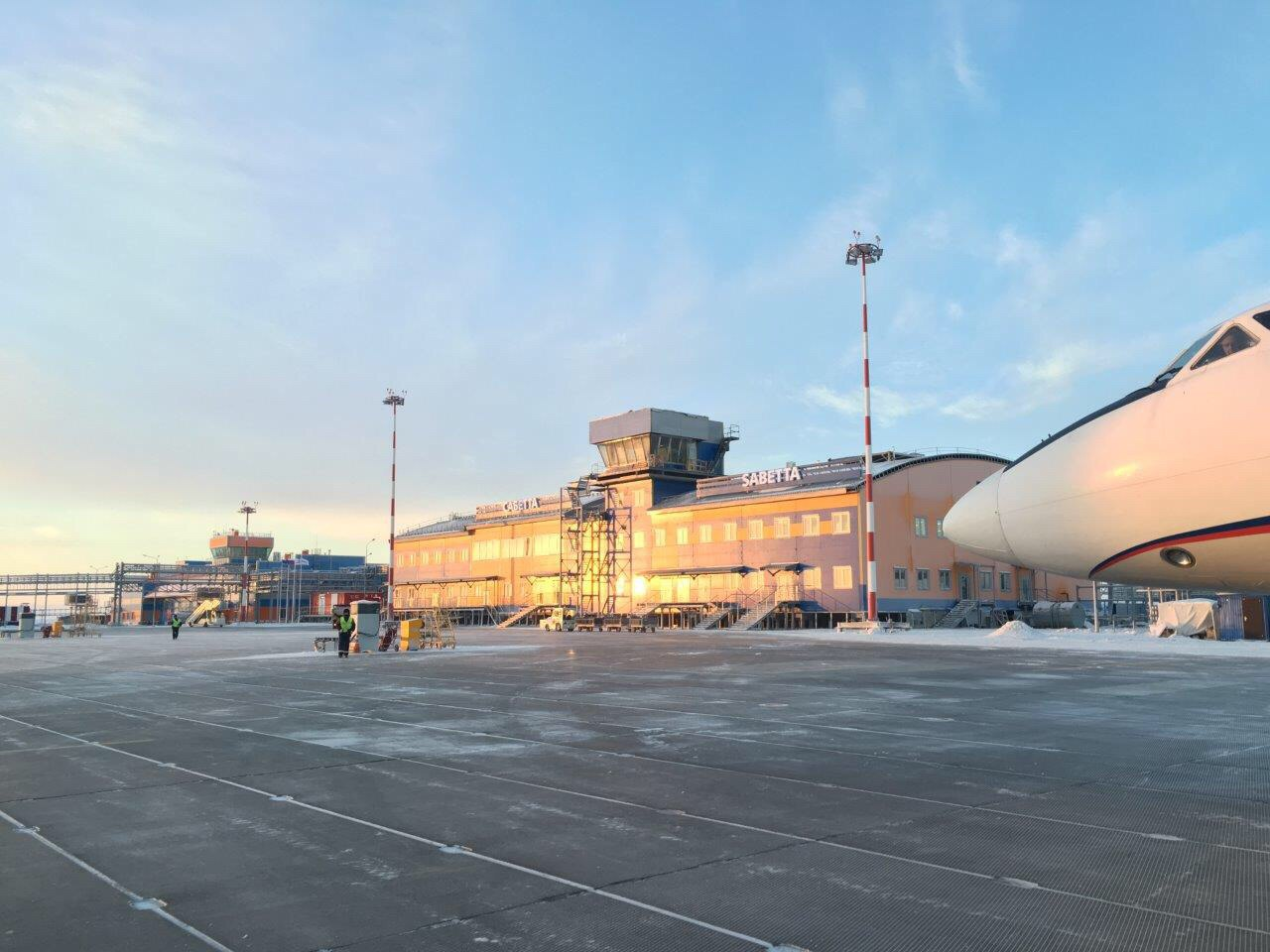
- IATA: SBT; ICAO: USDA

Summary
- Airport type: Public
- Location: Sabetta, Yamalo-Nenets Autonomous Okrug, Russia
- Elevation AMSL: 46 ft / 14 m
- Coordinates: 71°13′9″N 72°03′8″E
- Website: http://sabetta.aero

Maps
- Yamalo-Nenets Autonomous Okrug in Russia

- Location of the airport in Yamalo-Nenets

Runways
Direction	Length		Surface
Direction	m	ft	Surface
04/22	2,700	8,858	Concrete

Helipads
Number	Length		Surface
Number	m	ft	Surface
	42	138	Concrete
- Source: DAFIF

Sabetta International Airport (Russian: Международный аэропорт Сабетта) (IATA: SBT, ICAO: USDA) is an airport in Sabetta, Yamalo-Nenets Autonomous Okrug, Russia (in the Arctic).

== History ==
In 2009, when Novatek took control over the Yamal LNG in the Yuzhno-Tambeyskoye gas field, it identified the lack of transport infrastructures as one of the weaknesses of its development plan for the plant. Gazprom owns an airport 170 km from Sabetta's site, but building a new airport next to the Yamal LNG plant seemed more strategic. Constructions started in 2012. Built from scratch, Sabetta International Airport became operational in 2014. UTair's Boeing 737 was the first to land on the runway on 4 December 2014. The terminal became operational during the summer of 2015, and got its international certification in October 2015

In March 2015, UTair Aviation started weekly flights from Moscow-Vnukovo to Sabetta, mainly to cater to employees of the large LNG plants of the Yamalo-Nenets Autonomous Okrug.

== Description ==
Due to the climate, Sabetta's runway is paved with 15,000 prestressed concrete plates PAG-18 (6x2m, 5.2 tons each). The runway is 2704m long and 46m wide. An AN-124 landed on the runway on 6 March 2017. The capacity of the runway enabled Volga-Dnepr Airlines and AirBridgeCargo to deliver parts of the Yamal LNG plant built in Germany and in China.

Sabetta International Airport's terminal has a processing capacity of 200 passengers per hour. A 4500 tons gas station enables planes to refuel for long-haul flights.

The Sabetta International Airport is owned and operated by Yamal LNG.

== Facilities ==
The airport services Airbus A320, Boeing-737, Boeing 767, Sukhoi Superjet 100, Antonov An-124, Ilushin Il-76 and all lighter types of aircraft.

Aircraft at Sabetta International Airport

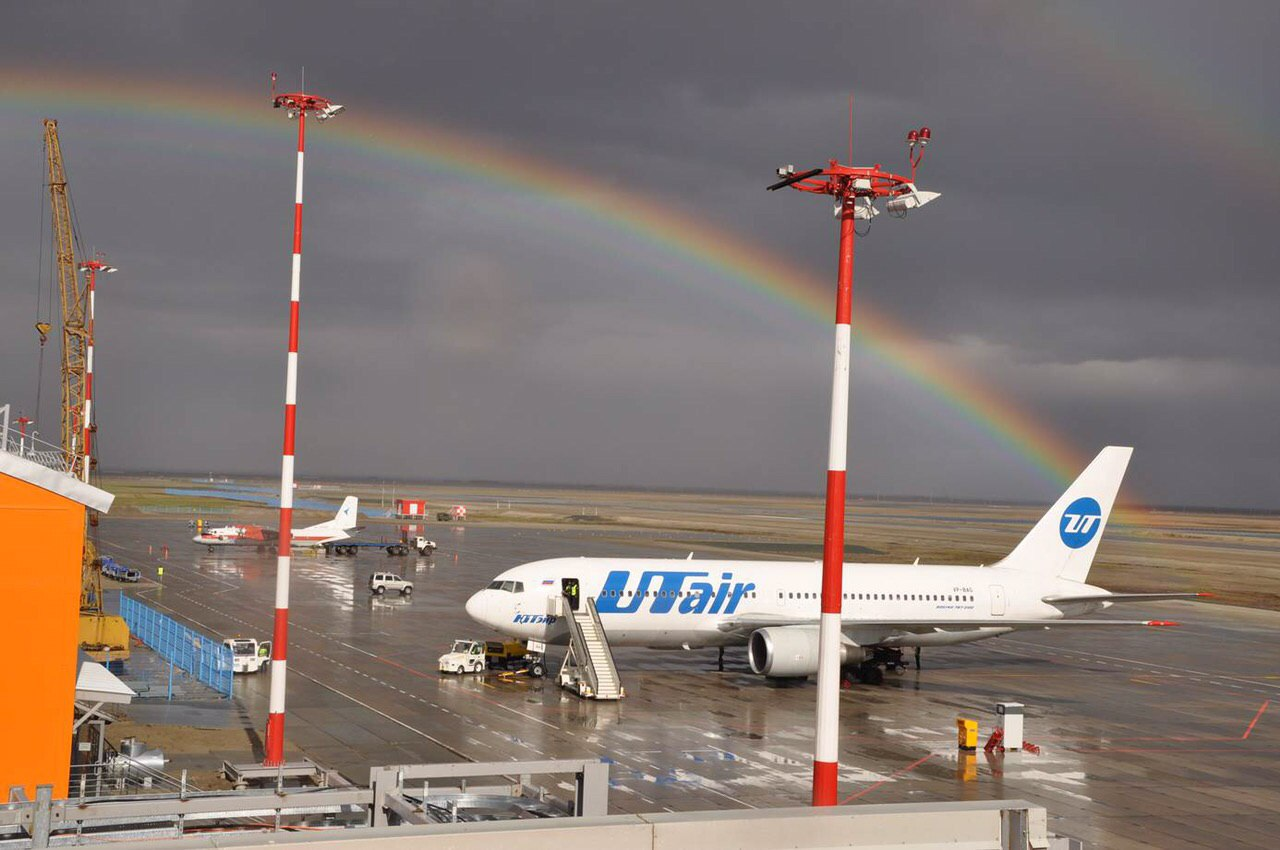

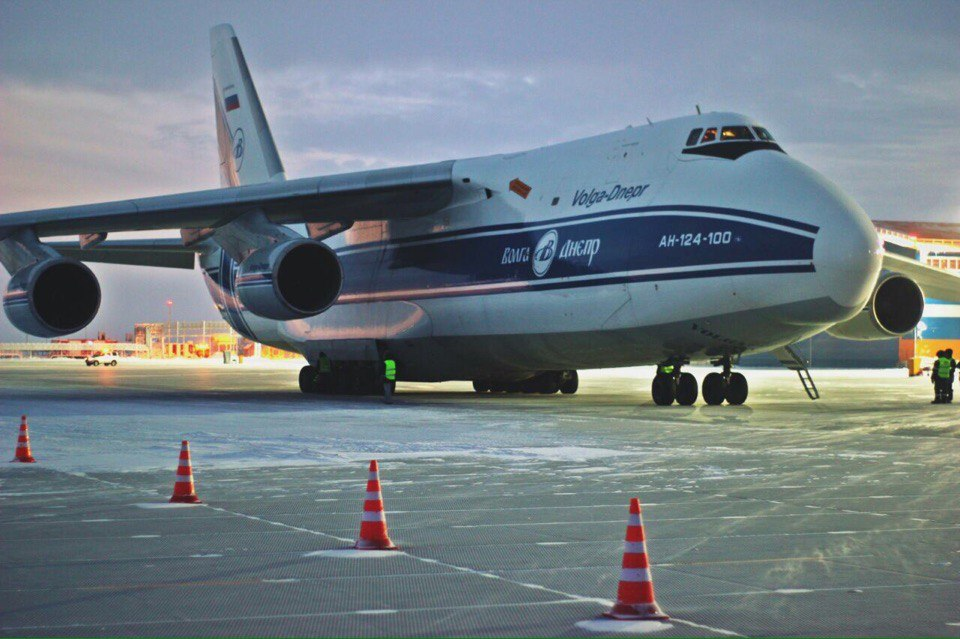

== Airlines and destinations ==
Airlines	Destinations
Red Wings Airlines	Moscow–Domodedovo
Utair	Moscow–Vnukovo

Sabetta International Airport should also connect flights to France and China as part of the deals between shareholders of Yamal LNG (French Total with 20% and Chinese China National Oil and Gas Exploration and Development Corp. -CNODC with 20%).

== See also ==
- List of airports in Russia
