= List of biggest airlines of Russia =

This is a list of biggest airlines of Russia, by number of passengers and by the amount of cargo transported.

== Passengers Transferred ==
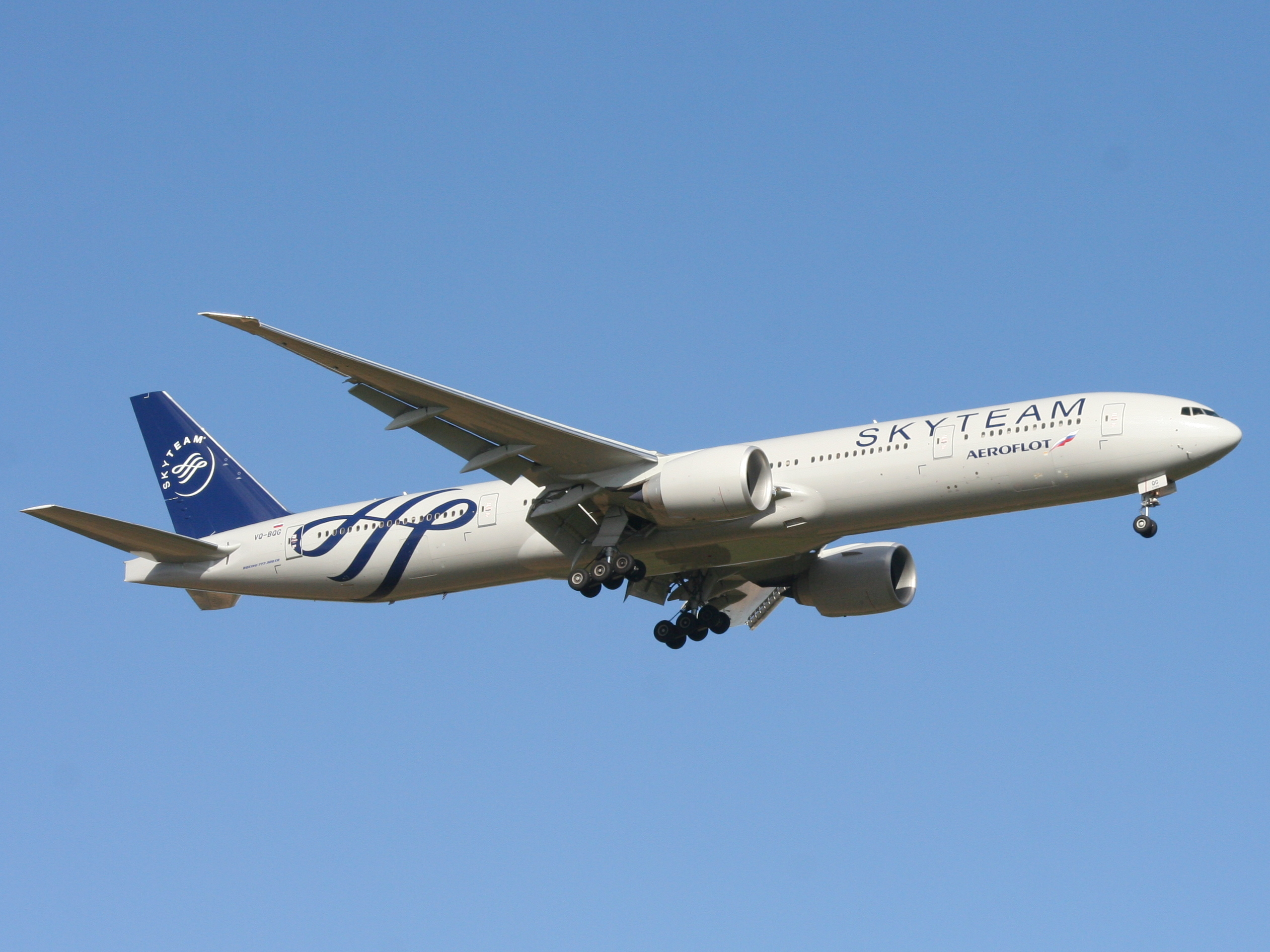
Aeroflot Boeing 777-300ER in SkyTeam livery taking off.

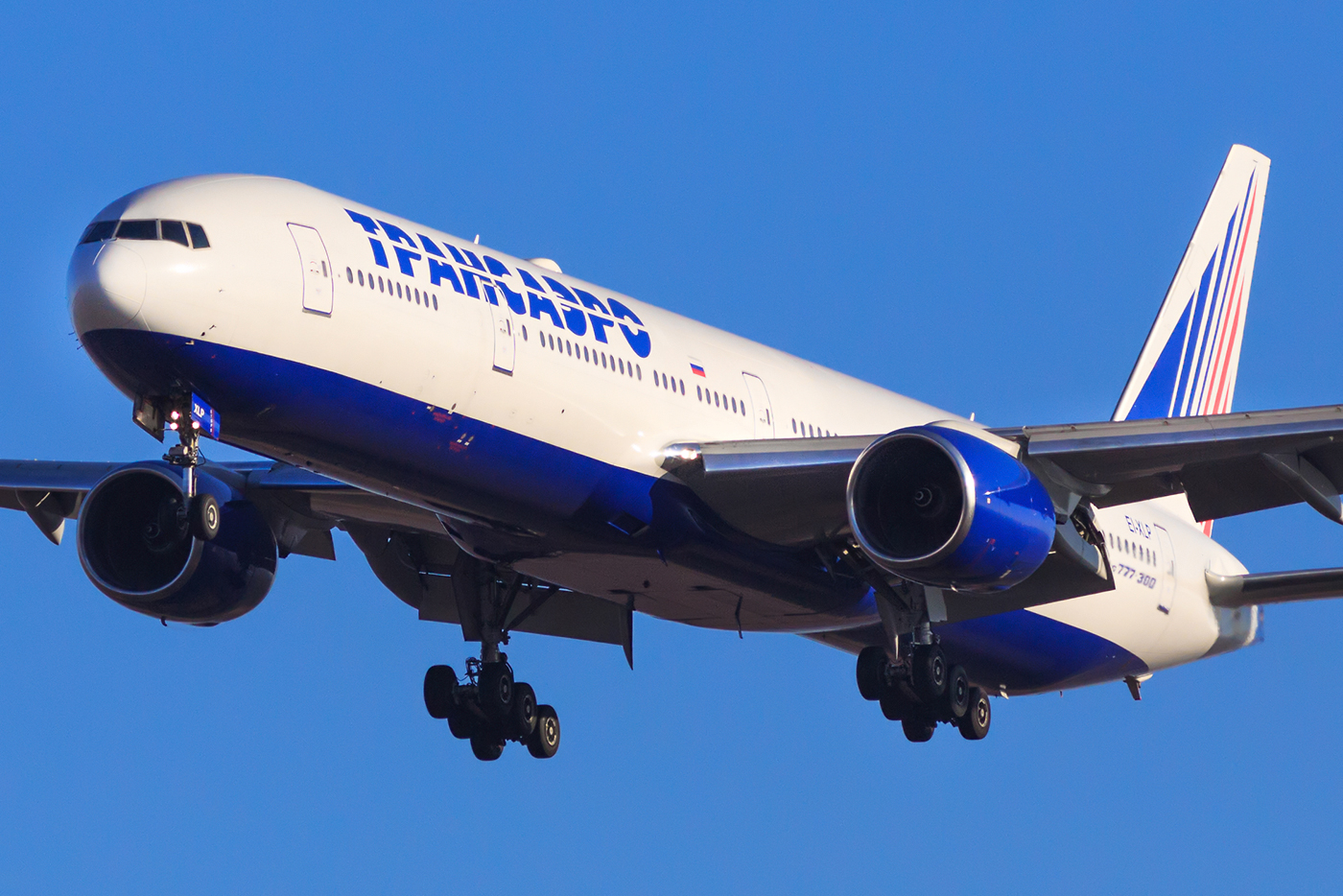
Transaero Boeing 777-300 landing at Vladivostok International Airport.

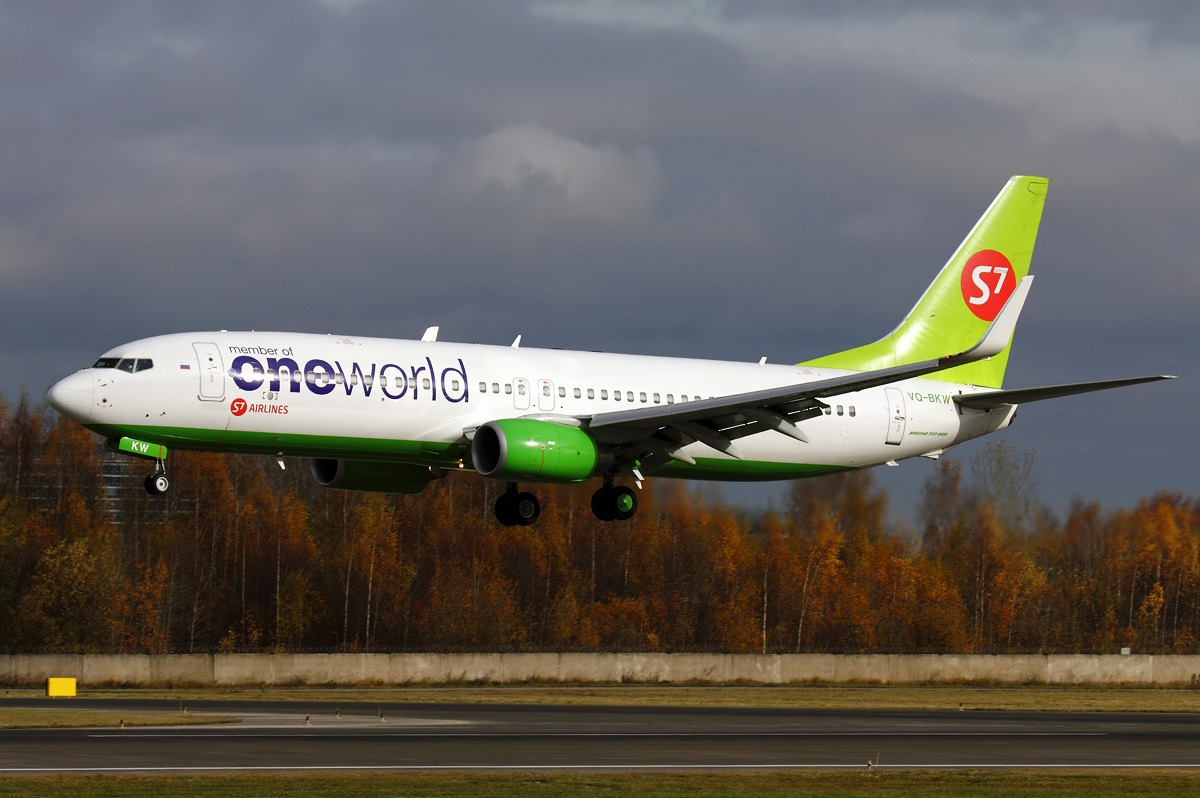
S7 Airlines Boeing 737-800 in Oneworld livery landing at Domodedovo International Airport.

=== 2022 Statistics ===
No.	Airline	Passengers (rounded to nearest 100 000)
1	Aeroflot	20 500 000
2	S7	15 700 000
3	Pobeda	11 700 000
4	Rossiya	8 500 000
5	Ural Airlines	8 500 000
6	Utair	5 500 000
7	Nordwind	4 100 000
8	Azur Air	3 200 000
9	Smartavia	2 200 000
10	Red wings	2 100 000

=== 2016 Statistics ===
Source: FAVT

No.	Airline	Passengers
1	Aeroflot	28 977 880
2	S7 Airlines	9 509 018
3	Rossiya Airlines	8 099 498
4	UTair Aviation	6 654 417
5	Ural Airlines	6 467 188
6	Pobeda	4 285 937
7	Globus Airlines	3 637 451
8	Azur Air	2 344 322
9	VIM Airlines	2 076 406
10	Nordwind Airlines	1 788 452

=== 2014 Statistics ===
The Rossaviation Statistics for Jan-Feb 2014
No.	Airline	Passenger value	Growth, %	Distance, p.km	Growth, %
1	Aeroflot^{4}	23,610,036	▲13,0	67,121,707	▲11,4
2	Transaero	13,198,591	▲5,6	47,066,421	▲0,1
3	UTair^{5}	8,564,340	▲4,7	20,198,948	▲20,4
4	S7 Airlines^{6}	7,938,199	▲12,0	15,582,789	▲9,8
5	Rossiya	5,191,783	▲13,1	10,147,404	▲10,5
6	Ural Airlines	5,160,588	▲16,8	13,327,154	▲13,2
7	Nordwind Airlines	4,472,038	▲22,3	13,401,739	▼1,2
8	Orenair	3,034,659	▼1,6	8,471,008	▼22.9
9	Globus	2,127,931	▼1,2	5,559,313	▲3,6
10	Donavia	1,736,153	▲28,3	2,447,994	▼22,3
11	VIM Airlines	1,613,970	▲16,0	3,389,297	▲10,2
12	Yamal Airlines	1,450,355	▲11,5	2,899,723	▲13,6
13	Metrojet	1,344,174	▲13,2	4,043,292	▲18,8
14	Pegas Fly	1,236,596	▲ by 4.4	6,059,896	▲ by 4.8
15	NordStar	1,104,938	▼11,1	2,868,556	▼14,6

=== 2013 Statistics ===
The Rossaviation Statistics for Jan-Feb 2013
No.	Airline	Passenger value	Growth, %	Distance, p.km	Growth, %
1	Aeroflot^{1}	20,902,447	▲18,4	60,226,342	▲19,2
2	Transaero	12,499,985	▲21,0	47,018,186	▲14,7
3	UTair^{2}	8,182,074	▲5,3	16,769,794	▲10,6
4	S7 Airlines^{3}	7,084,599	▲11,6	14,197,750	▲9,0
5	Rossiya	4,590,146	▲9,1	9,186,257	▲4,9
6	Ural Airlines	4,419,233	▲25,4	11,768,176	▲23,2
7	Nordwind Airlines	3,655,688	▲68,7	13,433,472	▲60,8
8	Orenair	3,140,950	▼1,6	10,983,780	▲4,6
9	Globus	2,154,312	▲10,9	5,366,394	▲16,7
10	VIM Airlines	1,391,020	▼8,0	3,075,973	▼11,4
11	Donavia	1,353,574	▲37,3	2,001,135	▲39,6
12	Yamal Airlines	1,301,242	▲42,5	2,553,011	▲48,6
13	NordStar	1,243,360	▲7,1	3,358,092	▲11,4
14	Metrojet	1,187,785	▲61,9	3,403,399	▲72,9
15	Yakutia Airlines	1,098,909	▼4,1	3,286,344	▲8,4

=== 2012 statistics ===
The Rossaviation Statistics for Jan-Feb 2012
No.	Airline	Passenger value	Growth, %	Distance, p.km	Growth, %
1	Aeroflot^{1}	17,656,152	▲24,6	50 532 518	▲20,3
2	Transaero	10,327,560	▲22,2	41 003 887	▲23,6
3	UTair^{2}	7,769,881	▲33,9	15 166 155	▲36,4
4	S7 Airlines^{3}	6,351,010	▲23,8	13 025 241	▲23,5
5	Rossiya	4,208,906	▲19,0	8 761 024	▲21,8
6	Ural Airlines	3,525,066	▲40,3	9 548 267	▲39,7
7	Orenair	3,193,474	▲27,4	10 505 213	▲40,1
8	Nordwind Airlines	2,167,267	▼25,9	8 353 261	▲14,7
9	Globus	1,942,782	▲32,0	4 596 794	▲34,1
10	VIM Airlines	1,511,682	▼6,3	3 472 582	▼12,3
11	Vladivostok Air	1,162,174	▼4,3	3 134 214	▼30,9
12	Nordstar Airlines	1,161,101	▲50,5	3 015 574	▲35,3
13	Yakutia Airlines	1,145,630	▲12,4	3 586 342	▲6,3
14	Donavia	985,682	▲14,1	1 433 658	▲12,8
15	Kuban Airlines	955,896	▲6,2	1 764 292	▲28,8

Notes

- ^4 Excluding the Aeroflot-Group Airlines Rossiya, Donavia, Aurora, Orenair и Pobeda
- ^5 Excluding UTair-Group Airlines UTair Express and other airlines
- ^6 Excluding an S7-Group Airline Globus
- The airlines mentioned with cursive letters, are the airlines, which ceased their operations currently

== By Cargo Transportation ==
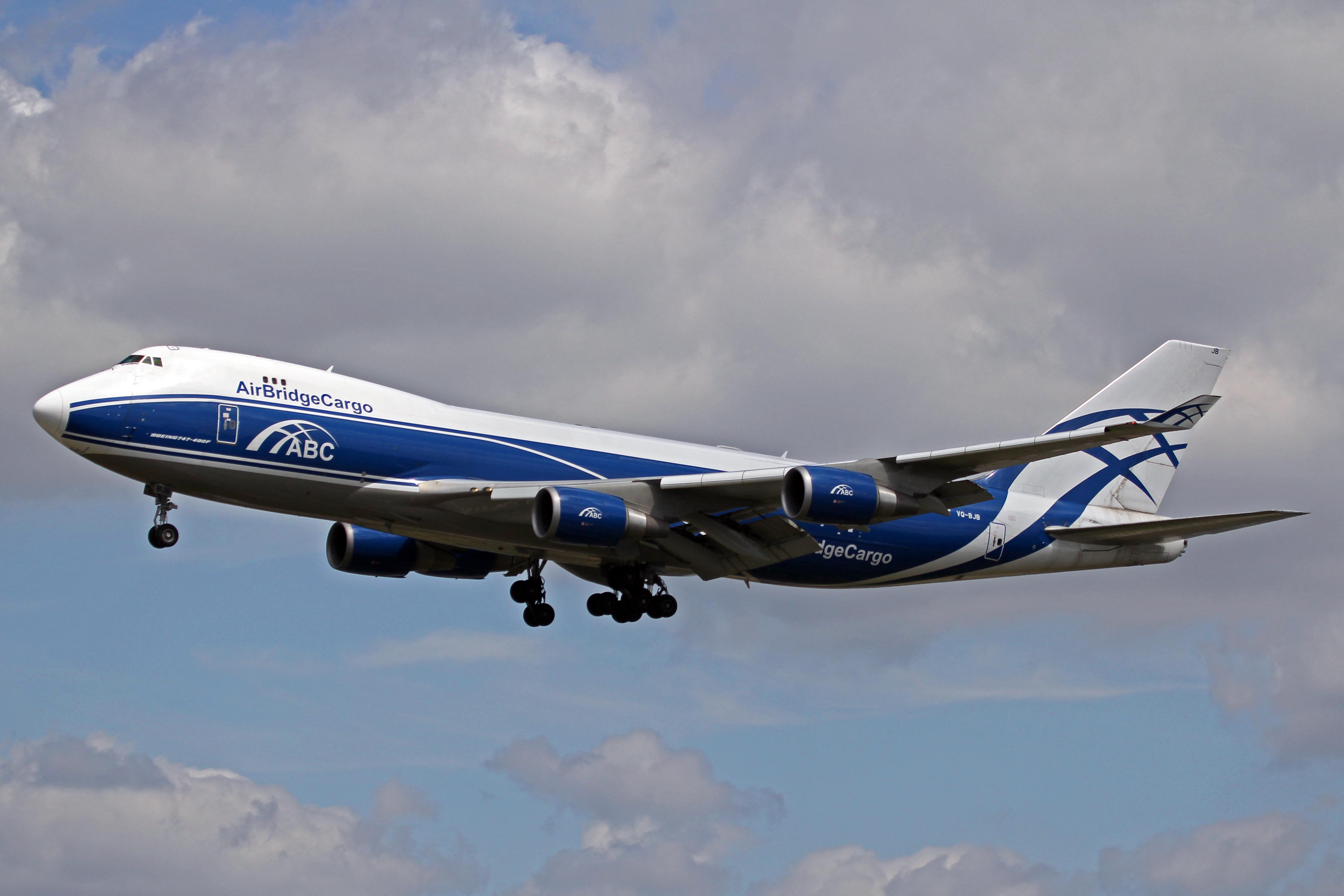
Boeing 747-400 AirBridgeCargo

=== 2014 Statistics ===
Rossaviation statistics Dec-Jan 2012-2013
No.	Airline	Cargo Transported, тонн	Growth, %	Distance, t.km	Growth, %
1	AirBridgeCargo	516,525	▲21,1	3,247,631	▲18,2
2	Aeroflot	145,285	▼17,7	681,699	▼25,9
3	Transaero	69,333	▼0,6	383,902	▼2,3
4	Volga-Dnepr Airlines	40,656	▼24,5	220,516	▼17,7
5	S7 Airlines	36,667	▲0,4	81,095	▲0,3
6	UTair	24,711	▼16,0	47,948	▼20,0
7	Abakan-Avia	14,629	—	20,105	—
8	224th fleet	14,400	▼6,8	45,872	▼4,2
9	Ural Airlines	14,346	▼2.7	42,745	▼1,8
10	Aviastar-TU	12,966	▲5,5	35,378	▲13,9
11	ATRAN	12,259	▲166,0	17,644	▲126,9
12	Globus	12,043	▼7,8	36,762	▼4,5
13	Alrosa	11,182	▼10,2	28,336	▼7,2
14	Yakutia Airlines	10,554	▼14,2	51,231	▼17,7
15	Rossiya	9,580	▼6,0	20,881	▼1,5

=== 2013 Statistics ===
Rossaviation statistics Dec-Jan 2012-2013
No.	Airline	Cargo Transported, тонн	Growth, %	Distance, t.km	Growth, %
1	AirBridgeCargo	426,442	▲20,9	2,746,976	▲15,5
2	Aeroflot	176,456	▼9,0	919,521	▼18,0
3	Transaero	69,735	▲5,9	392,993	▲3,0
4	Volga-Dnepr Airlines	53,835	▼19,0	268,125	▼23,7
5	S7 Airlines	36,515	▼2,4	80,862	▼4,6
6	UTair	29,412	▼3,2	59,962	▼3,9
7	224 fleet	15,453	▼7,3	47,873	▼5,7
8	Ural Airlines	14,744	▲9,5	43,533	▲2,2
9	Globus	13,063	▼6,2	38,479	▼3,3
10	Alrosa	12,458	▼13,7	30,532	▼20,6
11	Yakutia Airlines	12,298	▼21,5	62,219	▼8,7
12	Aviastar-TU	12,284	▼6,7	31,072	▼7,6
13	Polet Flight	10,576	▼51,0	50,056	▼53,8
14	Rossiya	10,192	▼3,2	21,208	▼2,8
15	Vladivostok Air	7,991	▼9,0	21,146	▼28,8

== By the fleet capacity and destinations ==
The Russia's biggest airlines by the number of the fleet and destinations:

Place	Airline/Group	Fleet Number	Destinations	ref
1	Aeroflot Group^{1}	218	293	
2	UTair Group^{2}	156	117	
3	S7 Group^{3}	61	80	

Notes

- ^1 Including all the Aeroflot-Group airlines: Rossiya, Donavia, Aurora, Orenair и Pobeda
- ^2 Including Azur Air, UTair-Express, UTair-Ukraine(to be renamed to Azur Air-Ukraine) and UTair Helicopters
- ^3 Including Globus

== See also ==
- List of defunct airlines of Russia
- List of airlines of Russia
- World's largest airlines
