= Russian Airlines =

Russian Airlines can refer to one of two de facto flag carrier airlines of the Russian Federation:

- Aeroflot, the former flag carrier of the Soviet Union, based at Moscow's Sheremetyevo International Airport. Its official English name is Russian Airlines.
- Rossiya, a newer entity based out of Saint Petersburg's Pulkovo Airport
