= HC Norilsk =

- City: Norilsk, Russia
- League: VHL
- Founded: 2023
- Home arena: Arktika Sport Palace (capacity: 2,184)
- Head coach: Sergei Golubovich
- Website: hcnorilsk.com

Hockey Club Norilsk (Russian: Хоккейный клуб "Норильск") is a Russian professional ice hockey club based in Norilsk. They play in the All-Russian Hockey League (VHL), the second level of Russian ice hockey.

== History ==
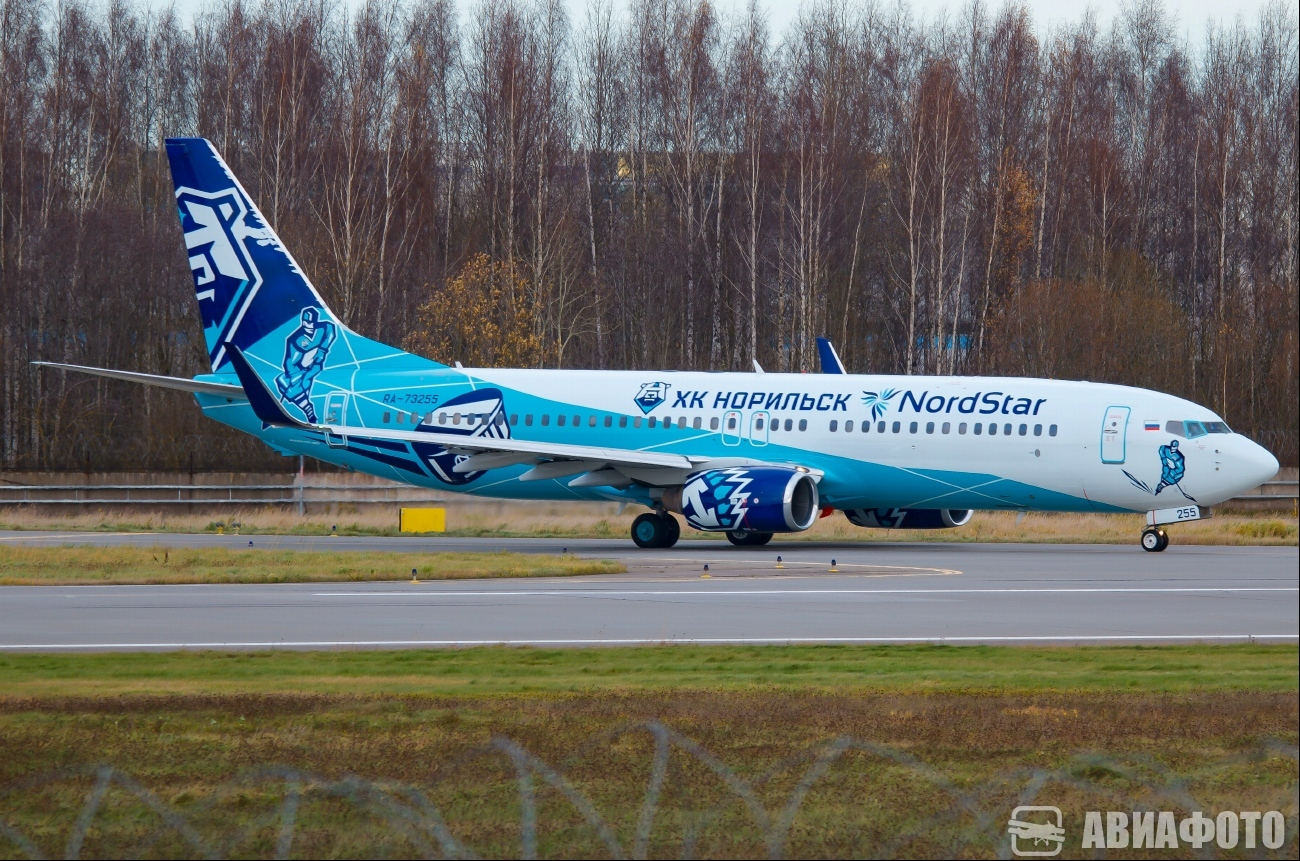
NordStar Boeing 737 painted in an HC Norilsk-themed livery

A professional hockey club in Norilsk was founded in 2023, for the first time since HC Zapolyarnik folded in 2001. HC Norilsk immediately became the northernmost professional ice hockey club in the world.

The team played their first game on July 19, 2023, losing to Chaika Nizhny Novgorod, the Youth Hockey League's reigning champion.

They played their first official game was on September 2, 2023, losing to Neftyanik Almetyevsk 2-3 in the shootout. Before the game, there was a performance by the Olympic champion in figure skating Anna Shcherbakova.

The team's first head coach was Aidar Musakayev, who previously coached HC Chelny. On January 18, 2024, he was fired, and Evgeny Filinov took over as the interim head coach. Despite that, Norilsk made the VHL playoffs in their first season, but were defeated by Rubin Tyumen 1-4 in the first round. The team's captain and top scorer Vladislav Kaletnik reached third place in goals across the VHL regular season with 22 and fifth in points with 51.

In October 2024, HC Norilsk started a promotion with NordStar Airlines, which painted one of their Boeing 737-800 aircraft into a livery themed after the club.

Before their second season, the club appointed Vladimir Gusev as the new head coach. Under his lead, Norilsk won a playoff series for the first time, defeating Gornyak-UGMK 4-2. In the second round of the VHL playoffs, they were swept by Yugra Khanty-Mansiysk.

In the 2025-26 season, Norilsk would go through several head coaches: on October 6, 2025, the team fired Gusev and appointed Nikolai Zolotukhin as the interim head coach then Alexei Zhdakhin became the new head coach on November 15, then Sergei Golubovich on January 29. Vladislav Kaletnik would also leave the team during the season. The team finished the season 30th in the VHL and missed the playoffs.

== Rivalries ==
Norilsk's games against the regional rival Sokol Krasnoyarsk have been called "the Frosty Derby" (Russian: "Морозное дерби").
