= Vladislav Kaletnik =

Russian professional ice hockey forward (born 1995)

- Born: March 24, 1995 (age 31) Angarsk, Russia
- Height: 5 ft 11 in (180 cm)
- Weight: 187 lb (85 kg; 13 st 5 lb)
- Position: Forward
- Shoots: Left
- Belarus team Former teams: HC Dinamo-Molodechno; Metallurg Magnitogorsk; HC Sochi; Admiral Vladivostok; Amur Khabarovsk
- Playing career: 2012–present

Vladislav Kaletnik (born March 24, 1995) is a Russian professional ice hockey forward. He is currently playing under contract with HC Dinamo-Molodechno of the Belarusian Extraleague.

== Career ==
Kaletnik started his career with Yermak Angarsk, his hometown club. He made his Supreme Hockey League debut with the club in 2013.

In 2014, Kaletnik joined HC Metallurg Magnitogorsk in the Kontinental Hockey League (KHL). He became a significant contributor for the team's checking lines. He played five seasons for the club and won the Gagarin Cup in the 2015-16 KHL season. In the next 2016-17 KHL season Metallurg made it to the Gagarin Cup Final series again, and Kaletnik scored the game-winning shorthanded goal in Game 2 of the final series. However, Metallurg lost the series to SKA Saint Petersburg in five games.

During the 2018-19 KHL season, Kaletnik's fifth with Metallurg, he was traded to HC Sochi.

In 2020, Kaletnik did not receive a KHL contract and returned to his hometown to play for Yermak in the VHL.

Before the 2021-22 KHL season, Kaletnik returned to the KHL and joined Admiral Vladivostok.

Kaletnik started the next season with Amur Khabarovsk. However, after eight games with Amur he was released from the team, and went on to join HC Lada Togliatti which at the time played in the VHL.

In the next season, Kaletnik joined the newly created VHL club HC Norilsk. He became the team's captain and top scorer in its first season and reached third place in goals fifth in points across the VHL regular season. He signed a two-year extension with the team afterwards. In his second season with the team, he was tied for first in the team and fourth in the league in points with Danila Dyadenkin.

During the 2025-26 VHL season, Kaletnik left Norilsk and joined CSK VVS Samara.

Before the 2026-27 season, Kaletnik joined HC Dinamo-Molodechno in the Belarusian Extraleague.

== Career statistics ==
			Regular season					Playoffs
Season	Team	League	GP	G	A	Pts	PIM	GP	G	A	Pts	PIM
2011–12	Angarsky Yermak	MHL-B	32	6	6	12	45	3	1	1	2	6
2012–13	Angarsky Yermak	MHL-B	38	21	6	27	32	—	—	—	—	—
2012–13	Yermak Angarsk	VHL	6	0	0	0	0	5	0	0	0	0
2013–14	Angarsky Yermak	MHL-B	8	7	2	9	0	—	—	—	—	—
2013–14	Yermak Angarsk	VHL	37	5	6	11	12	—	—	—	—	—
2014–15	Stalnye Lisy	MHL	3	1	1	2	2	—	—	—	—	—
2014–15	Metallurg Magnitogorsk	KHL	38	1	4	5	8	—	—	—	—	—
2014–15	Yuzhny Ural Orsk	VHL	2	0	1	1	0	—	—	—	—	—
2015–16	Metallurg Magnitogorsk	KHL	56	6	5	11	22	21	0	1	1	18
2016–17	Metallurg Magnitogorsk	KHL	49	5	4	9	20	17	2	1	3	4
2017–18	Metallurg Magnitogorsk	KHL	54	5	1	6	33	11	0	0	0	12
2018–19	Metallurg Magnitogorsk	KHL	19	1	1	2	10	—	—	—	—	—
2018–19	HC Sochi	KHL	36	4	3	7	12	6	0	1	1	2
2019–20	HC Sochi	KHL	28	2	4	6	16	—	—	—	—	—
2020–21	Yermak Angarsk	VHL	40	7	17	24	86	—	—	—	—	—
2021–22	Admiral Vladivostok	KHL	21	3	2	5	14	—	—	—	—	—
2022–23	Amur Khabarovsk	KHL	8	1	0	1	6	—	—	—	—	—
2022–23	HC Lada Togliatti	VHL	32	3	14	17	22	7	3	1	4	6
2023–24	HC Norilsk	VHL	54	22	28	50	43	5	1	3	4	6
2024–25	HC Norilsk	VHL	61	24	32	56	36	9	3	2	5	18
2025–26	HC Norilsk	VHL	24	2	9	11	8	—	—	—	—	—
2025–26	CSK VVS Samara	VHL	9	1	1	2	2	6	1	1	2	6
KHL totals			309	28	24	52	141	55	2	3	5	36

== Awards and honors ==
Award	Year
KHL
Gagarin Cup (Metallurg Magnitogorsk)	2016
