= Orenair =

Russian airline

Orenair Orenburg Airlines ORENAIR — Оренбургские авиалинии
IATA	ICAO	Call sign
R2	ORB	ORENBURG
- Founded: 1992
- Ceased operations: 2016 (merged with Rossiya)
- Hubs: Orenburg Tsentralny Airport
- Secondary hubs: Domodedovo International Airport; Simferopol International Airport
- Fleet size: 19
- Destinations: 12
- Parent company: Aeroflot
- Headquarters: Orenburg, Russia
- Key people: Victor Zyukin (Acting General Director)
- Website: orenair.ru

Orenburg Airlines or JSC Orenair (Russian: Оренбургские авиалинии) was a Russian airline with its head office on the property of Orenburg Tsentralny Airport in Orenburg. It operated domestic passenger services and inclusive tour charters, as well as aerial work and special flights. Its main base was Orenburg Tsentralny Airport and it had hubs at Domodedovo and Simferopol International Airport.

== History ==
The airline was formed from the Aeroflot Orenburg Division, which was established in 1932. In 1992, it began to operate under the name Orenair. It was the first Russian domestic airline to introduce the hub system of connecting flights in Orenburg, providing a full service for transfer passengers, and was the first Russian domestic airline to introduce through air fares.

In 2010, Orenair was acquired by Aeroflot and was likely to engage in fleet modernization as a result of the merger. In 2015, Orenair acquired Air Austral's B777-200ER F-ORUN, which Air Austral had been trying to sell for a year.

In April 2016, Aeroflot planned to merge Orenair and Donavia into Rossiya to form one larger airline based in Saint-Petersburg, Moscow and Rostov-On-Don.. On 26 May 2016, the airline's air operator's certificate was revoked after integration into Rossiya.

== Fleet ==
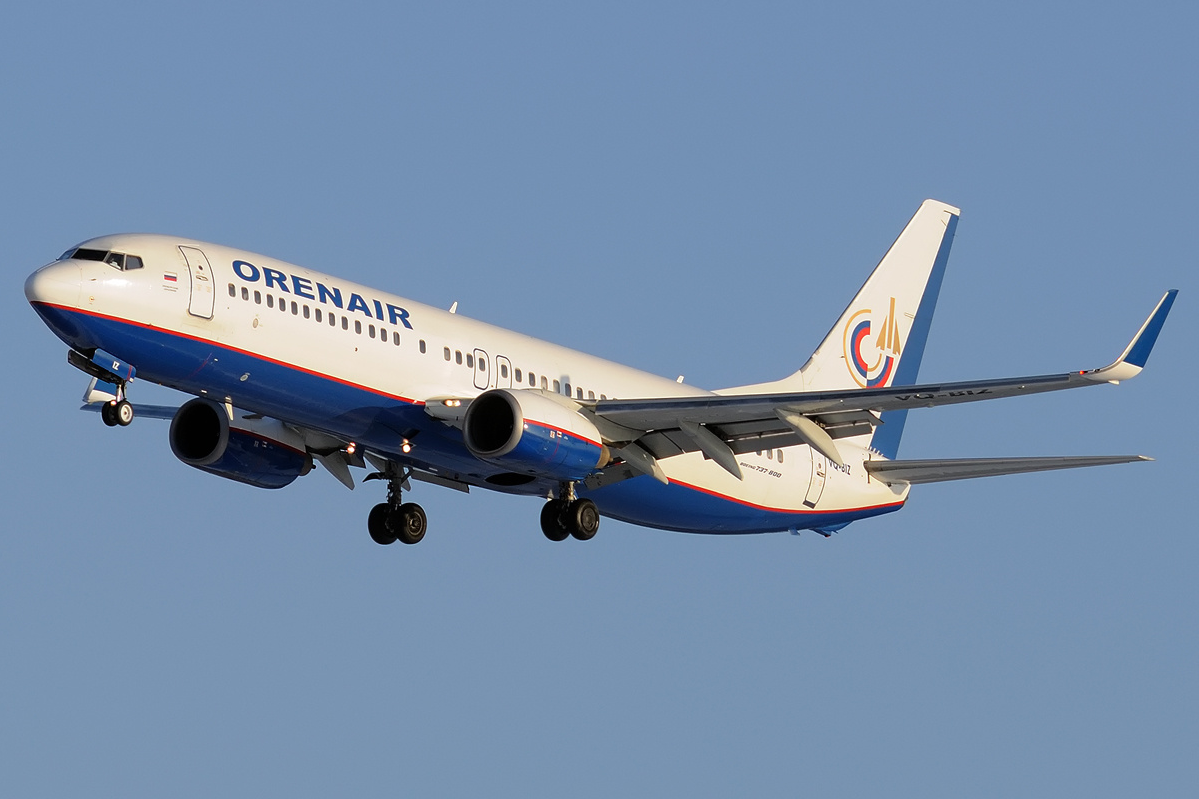
Former Orenair Boeing 737-800

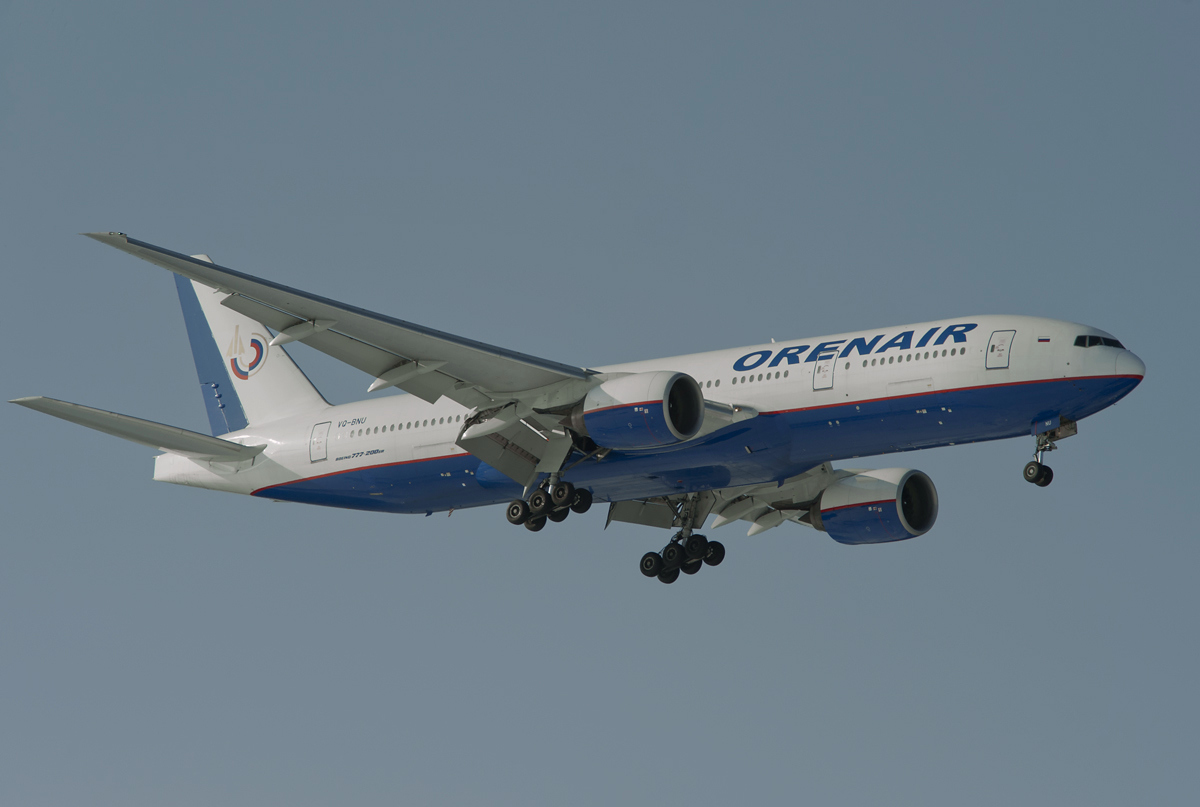
Former Orenair Boeing 777-200ER

=== Fleet at time of merger ===
In April 2016, the entire Orenair fleet was assigned to Rossiya. The remaining Orenair fleet consisted of the following aircraft (as of December 2016 the remaining 777 was at Phoenix Goodyear Airport):

Orenair fleet
Aircraft	In fleet	Orders	Passengers				Notes
Aircraft	In fleet	Orders	C	Y+	Y	Total	Notes
Boeing 777-200ER	1	—	14	34	316	364	Stored at PUJ, to be transferred to Rossiya
Total	1						

=== Previously operated ===
As of August 2006 the airline also operated:

- 1 Yakovlev Yak-40
- 8 Tupolev Tu-134
- 4 Tupolev Tu-154B
- 1 Tupolev Tu-154M
- 4 Tupolev Tu-204-100
- 2 Boeing 737-500

== Incidents ==
- On 10 February 2016, Orenair Flight 554 departing from Punta Cana International Airport to Domodedovo International Airport experienced an engine failure, which caused fire and smoke in the cabin. The aircraft returned to Punta Cana, without fatalities or injuries.
