= Rostov-on-Don Airport =

Defunct airport in Russia (1925–2018)

Rostov-on-Don Airport Аэропорт Ростов-на-Дону Aeroport Rostov-na-Donu
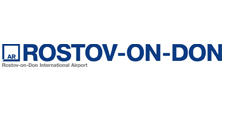

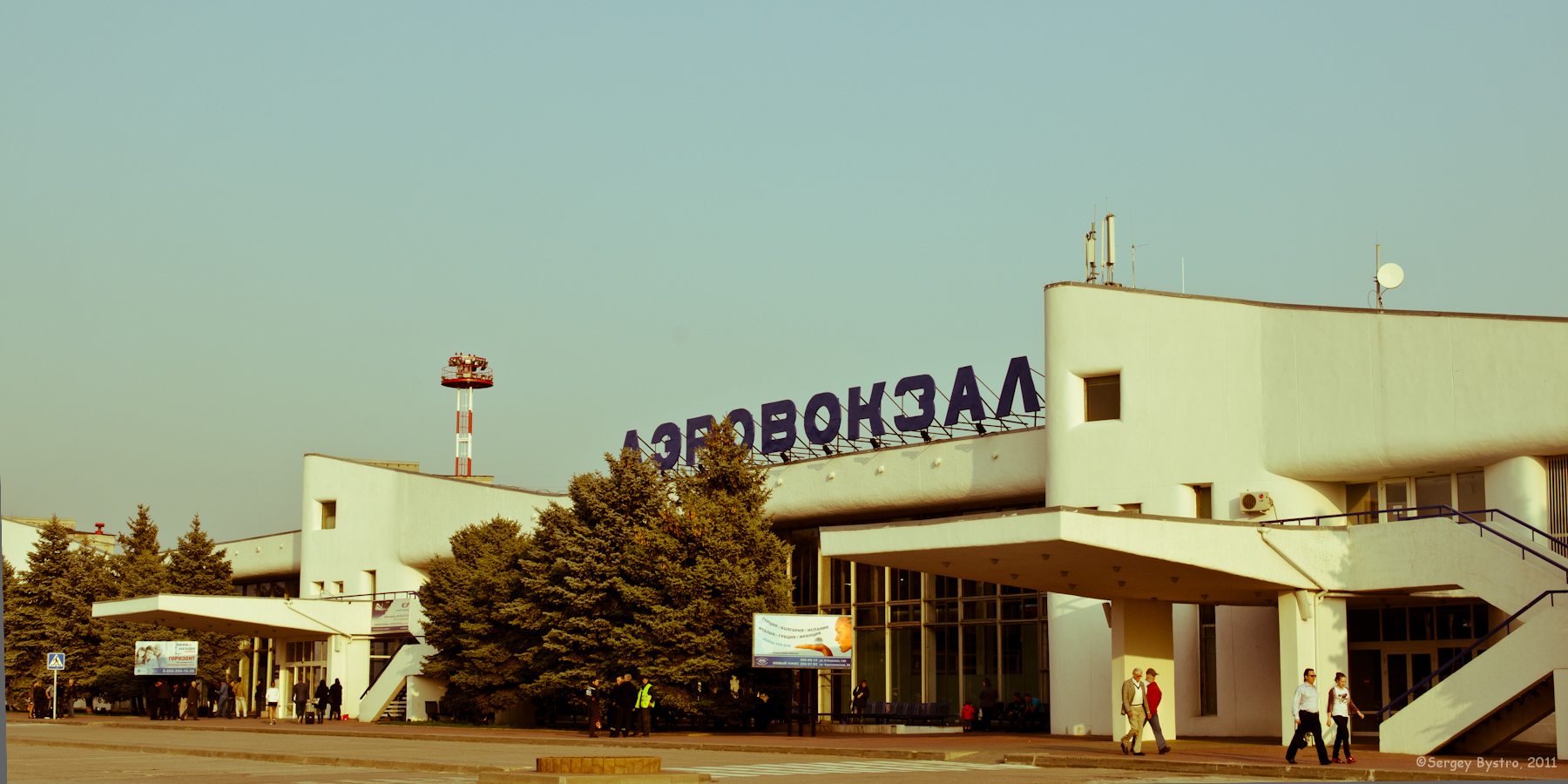
- IATA: ROV, RVI; ICAO: URRR

Summary
- Airport type: Defunct
- Operator: JSC "Airport Rostov-on-Don"
- Serves: Rostov-on-Don
- Location: Rostov-on-Don, Russia
- Opened: 1925
- Closed: 1 March 2018
- Passenger services ceased: 7 December 2017
- Elevation AMSL: 79 m (259 ft)
- Coordinates: 47°15′30″N 39°49′6″E
- Website: ar-rov.ru

Map
- Location of airport in Rostov Oblast

Runways
Direction	Length		Surface
Direction	m	ft	Surface
04/22	2,500	8,202	Concrete

Statistics (2017)
- Passengers: 2,766,000 ▲

Rostov-on-Don Airport (IATA: ROV, RVI, ICAO: URRR) was an international airport located 8 kilometres (5 mi) east of the city of Rostov-on-Don, in southern Russia. It was one of the largest airports in the south-west of Russia and the 12th busiest in the country. It was founded in 1925 and was designated an international airport in 1986. The airport served 50 destinations in Russia and abroad and hosted 30 airlines in 2015. It was a hub for Donavia until its merger with Rossiya. In 2015, Rostov Airport handled 2.06 million passengers, including 565 thousand on international routes.

All regular and charter flights were transferred to Platov International Airport by 7 December 2017 11:00. By 1 March 2018 the old airport was scheduled to be officially closed. As of 2021, the airport was closed for further demolition.

== History ==
In 1925 an airfield was constructed near Rostov-on-Don. A plot of 49 hectares (120 acres) of land was allocated for it in the fields of one of the city's suburbs. A house for the airport's head and the staff, as well as fuel storage facilities, were constructed. A paved road connected the airport with the city. On 15 June 1925 the first route (Rostov-Kharkov-Oryol-Moscow) was launched. During the first three months, only 80 passengers were flown, but this was considered a success. In 1926 Rostov became a stopover for a high-demand route from Moscow to Tiflis. In the 1930s, the first terminal building was constructed, but during World War II the airport was destroyed.

In the post-war years, Rostov airport had to be restored from the ruins. By 1949, a runway of 2,000 metres (6,562 ft), the terminal building, apron and taxiways were constructed and the airport was re-launched. The current airport terminal was constructed in 1977. In the same year, the airport's runway was strengthened and lengthened by 500 metres (1,600 ft). In 1986, Rostov was designated an international airport, and scheduled international flights were launched in 1991. In 1992, the airport joined Airports Council International, the worldwide professional association of airport operators.

In the 2000s, the airport was reconstructed, its runway was strengthened and lengthened from 2,500 to 2,700 metres (8,202 to 8,858 ft) and a new departure hall with 300 seats was constructed. In 2006–2007, modernization and expansion (for 200 more seats) of the international sector of the airport was carried out, including the installation of new passenger elevators and escalators as well as new luggage conveyor and equipment for customs control. In 2007, a renewed VIP hall was opened. In 2009, a new flight information system with 49 monitors was installed. The airport's security was upgraded, including the installation of a new CCTV system and screening equipment at the terminal's entrances. In 2012, the airport's catering service was upgraded to provide up to 3,000 flight meals a day.

In 2007, passenger traffic exceeded 1 million people, and by 2013 this number had doubled. In 2014, Rostov Airport was taken over by Airports of Regions, the largest airport operator in Russia.

The new Platov International Airport was constructed for the upcoming 2018 FIFA World Cup. All flights from the old airport were transferred to the new facility on 7 December 2017.

== Infrastructure ==
The airport met International Civil Aviation Organization 4D standards. It had one concrete runway, 04/22, PCN 59/R/C/W/T, 2,500 metres (8,202 ft) long and 45 metres (148 ft) wide. The minimum visibility for take-off was 200 m.

The airport was certified to handle aircraft up to the size of the Airbus A321 and Boeing 767, as well as any types of helicopters. It had an apron with 53 parking positions and total area of 449,780 square metres (4,841,400 sq ft).

A terminal building, constructed in 1977, provided an operational area of 15,537 square metres (167,240 sq ft). It could serve 600 passengers per hour on domestic routes, and 450 passengers per hour on international routes.

== Missile site ==
In late 2023, a new S-300 anti-aircraft missile site became visible along one of the airport's taxiways. This missile site was established to protect the airport from Ukrainian drone attacks in the wake of Russia's 2022 invasion of Ukraine. The missile site can still be seen on recent Google Maps satellite imagery, from 2024.

== Airlines and destinations ==
There are no longer regular flights at the airport. The last regular flight was made on 7 December 2017 by Aeroflot to Saint Petersburg. The airport was scheduled to be fully closed on 1 March 2018, but during the 2018 FIFA World Cup it worked as a spare runway and/or during emergency situations.

== Statistics ==
=== Annual traffic ===
Annual passenger traffic
Year	Passengers	% change
2010	1,440,000	Steady
2011	1,716,680	▲19.3%
2012	1,873,644	▲9.2%
2013	2,167,728	▲14.7%
2014	2,342,302	▲6.9%
2015	2,062,855	▼11.9%
2016	2,094,953	▲1.6%
2017	2,766,000	▲32%

== Accidents and incidents ==
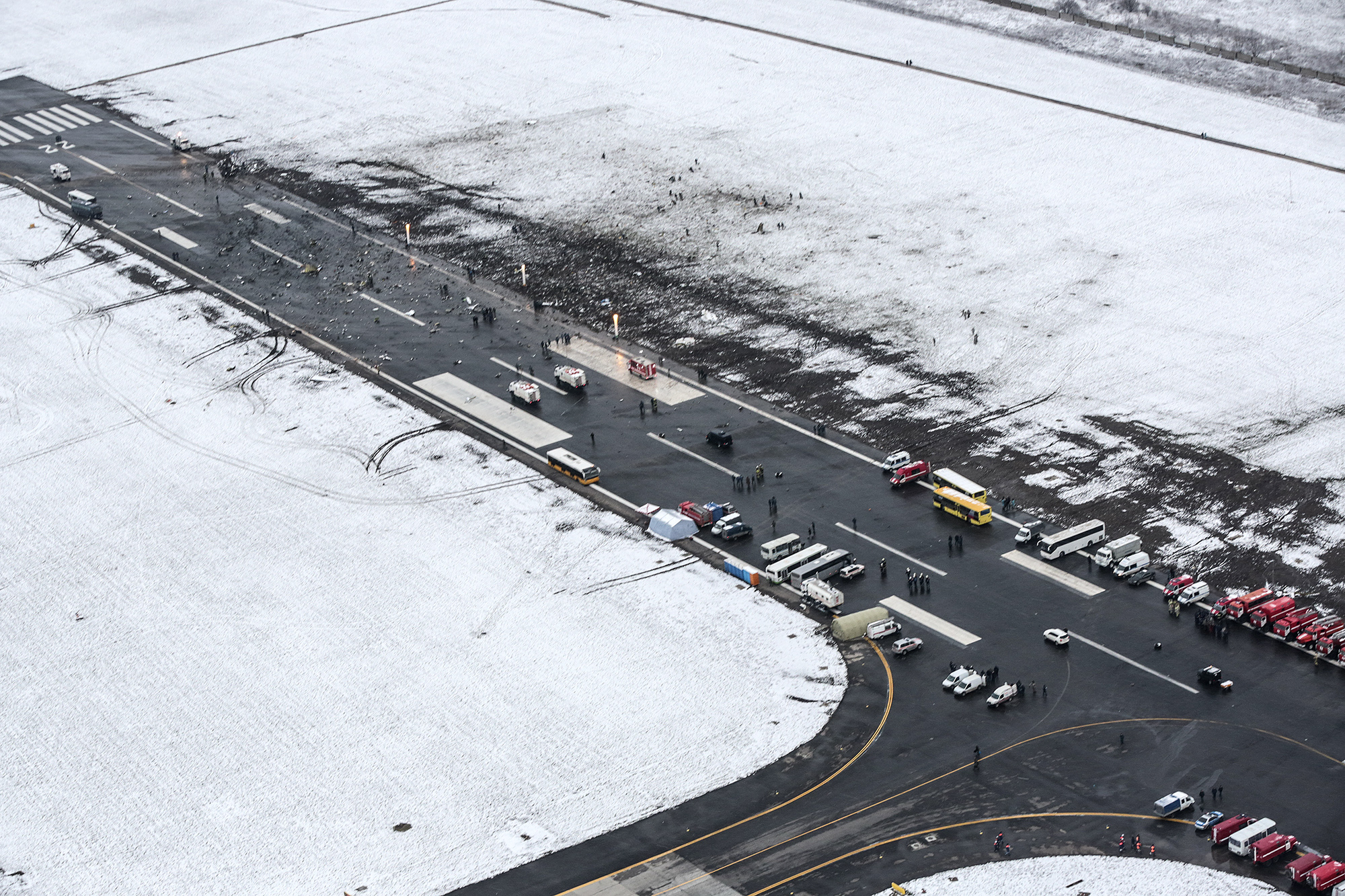
The aftermath of Flydubai Flight 981

- On 19 March 2016, at 3:42 am local time, Flydubai Flight 981, a Boeing 737-8KN registered as A6-FDN, crashed after attempting a go-around due to a loss of situational awareness. The accident killed all 62 occupants on board.

== See also ==
- List of airports in Russia
