= Orenburg Airport =

Airport in Orenburg, Russia

Yuri Gagarin Orenburg International Airport
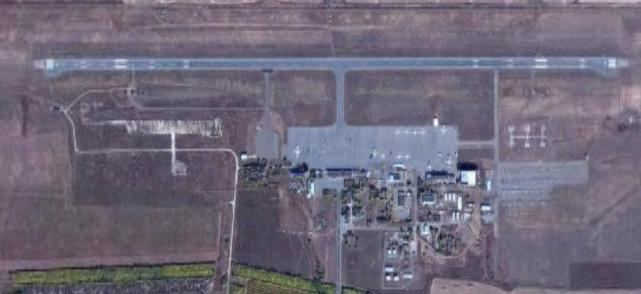
- IATA: REN; ICAO: UWOO

Summary
- Airport type: Public
- Operator: Rossiya Airlines
- Serves: Orenburg
- Location: Orenburg, Russia
- Hub for: Orenburzhye
- Elevation AMSL: 387 ft (118 m)
- Coordinates: 51°47′44.83″N 55°27′24.28″E
- Website: ar-ren.ru

Map
- Location of airport in Orenburg Oblast

Runways
Direction	Length		Surface
Direction	ft	m	Surface
08/26	8,202	2,500	Concrete

Statistics (2023)
- Passengers: 1,042 thousand
- Sources: Orenburg Central Airport (see also 2023 statistics)

Orenburg Airport (Russian: Аэропорт Оренбург) (IATA: REN, ICAO: UWOO) is a civil airport located about 25 km east of Orenburg city. Now defunct Orenair had its head office on the airport property.

The airport was built at its present location in the mid-1970s. In 2011, the government of Orenburg named the airport after Yuri Gagarin.

== Airlines and destinations ==
Airlines	Destinations
Aeroflot	Moscow–Sheremetyevo
Air Cairo	Seasonal charter: Sharm El Sheikh
AlMasria Universal Airlines	Seasonal charter: Sharm El Sheikh
azimuth	Mineralnye Vody
Azur Air	Seasonal charter: Antalya
Ikar	Sochi
IrAero	Baku; Seasonal: Itkutsk, Sochi
Red Wings Airlines	Yekaterinburg; Seasonal: Batumi
Rossiya Airlines	Moscow–Sheremetyevo, Saint Petersburg
S7 Airlines	Novosibirsk
Smartavia	Moscow–Sheremetyevo; Seasonal: Saint Petersburg, Sochi
Southwind Airlines	Seasonal charter: Antalya
UVT Aero	Almaty, Gorno-Altaysk, Kazan, Nizhny Novgorod

== Incidents and accidents ==
- On 1 March 1980, an Aeroflot Tupolev Tu-154A crashed on approach to the airport after deviating below a sufficient flight path and touching ground 68 meters before the runway. There were no fatalities, however the aircraft was damaged beyond repair.

== See also ==
- List of airports in Russia
- List of the busiest airports in the former USSR
