= NordStar =

Russian airline

Nordstar
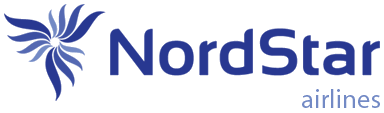

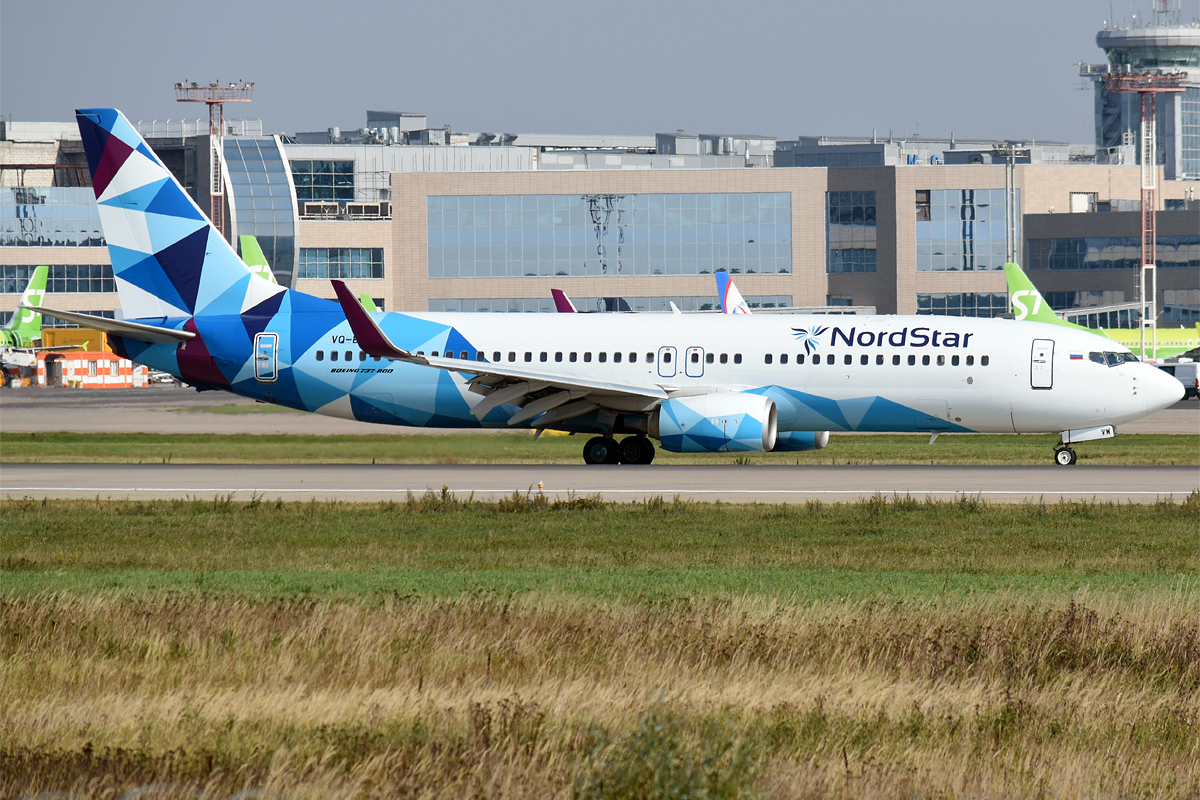
- NordStar Boeing 737-800 at Moscow-DME
IATA	ICAO	Call sign
Y7	TYA	TAIMYR
- Founded: 2009; 17 years ago
- Hubs: Krasnoyarsk–International; Norilsk–Alykel
- Secondary hubs: Moscow–Domodedovo; Novosibirsk–Tolmachevo
- Fleet size: 9
- Destinations: 26
- Headquarters: Norilsk, Russia
- Key people: Leonid Mokhov, CEO
- Website: nordstar.ru

NordStar, officially JSC NordStar Airlines (Russian: Акционерное общество «Авиакомпания «НордСтар») is a Russian airline based in Norilsk. Its main base is Alykel Airport. It is one of the 15 largest airlines in Russia according to the Federal Air Transport Agency. It is on the List of airlines banned in the European Union.

== History ==
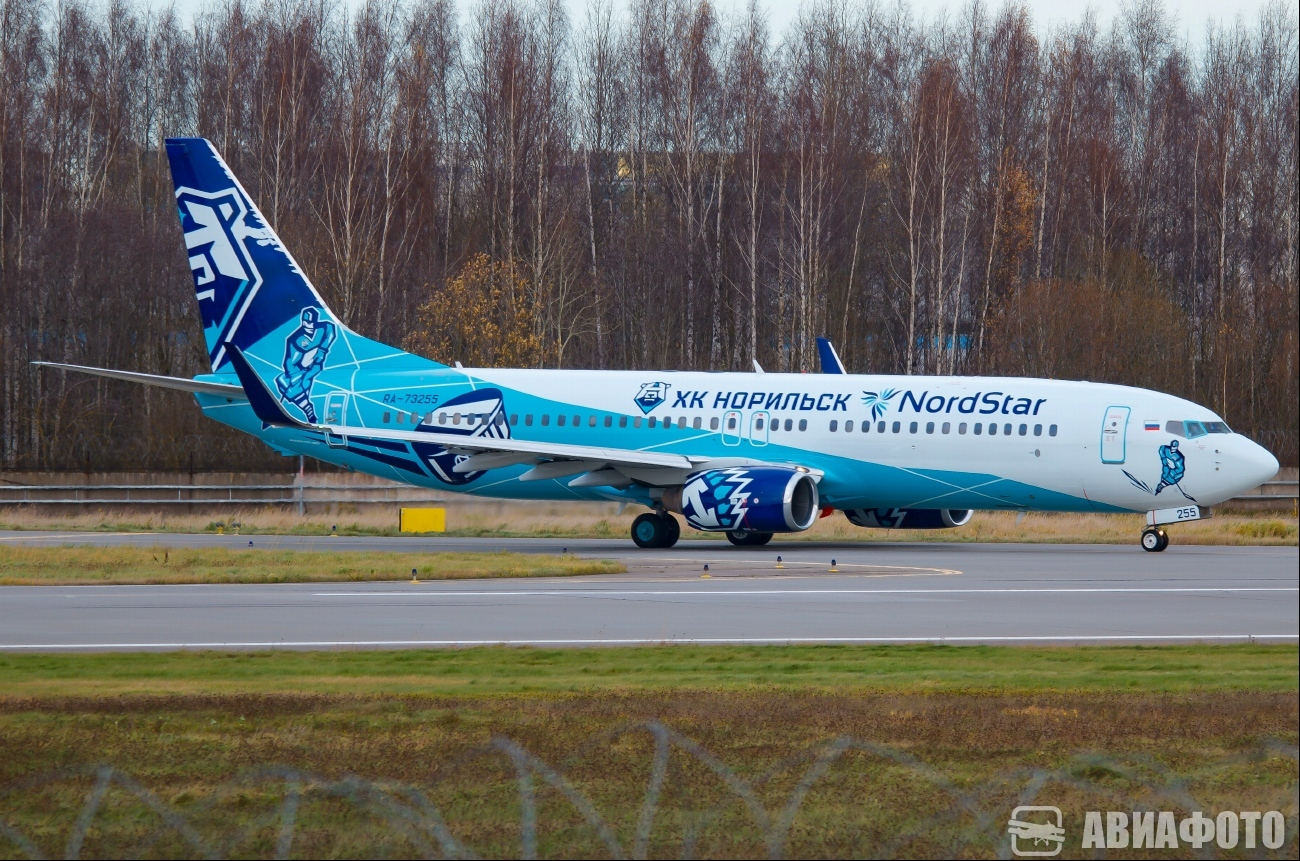
NordStar Boeing 737 painted in an HC Norilsk-themed livery

NordStar was founded by Norilsk Nickel and was launched on 17 December 2008, based on local Taimyr Peninsula airlines. NordStar operated its first flight on 17 June 2009, from Norilsk to Moscow Domodedovo and Krasnoyarsk.

On 25 March 2022 Norilsk Nickel announced that NordStar was sold to airline management.

In October 2024, NordStar started a promotion with HC Norilsk and painted one of their Boeing 737-800 aircraft into a livery themed after the club.

== Destinations ==
As of August 2025, the airline serves one country with 26 destinations in Russia and China.

== Fleet ==
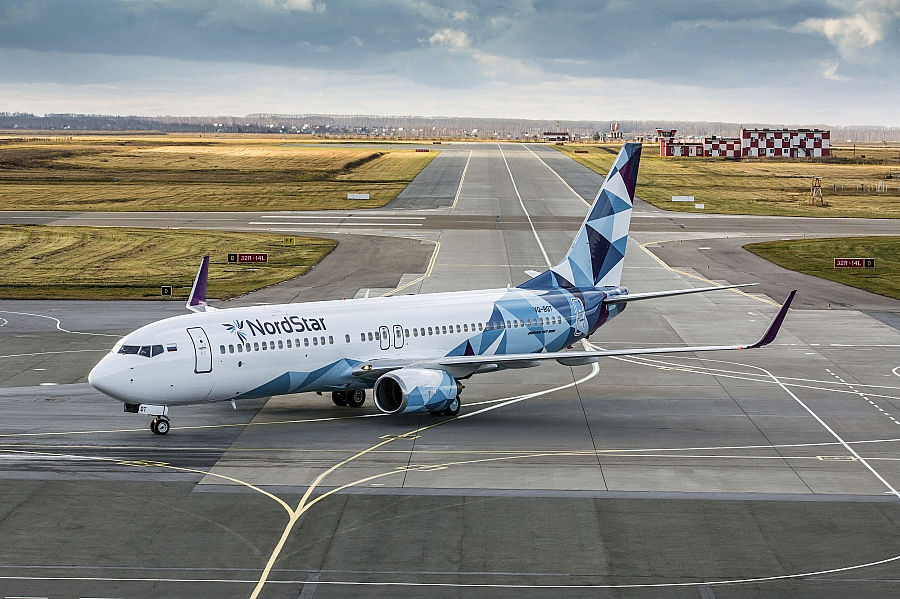
NordStar Boeing 737-800

As of August 2025, NordStar operates the following aircraft:

NordStar fleet
Aircraft	In service	Orders	Passengers			Notes
Aircraft	In service	Orders	C	Y	Total	Notes
Boeing 737-300	1	—	0	148	148	
Boeing 737-800	8	—	10	162	172	
Boeing 737-800	8	—	6	174	180	
Total	9	—				
