= Donavia =

Russian airline

Donavia Донавиа
IATA	ICAO	Call sign
D9	DNV	DONAVIA
- Founded: 15 June 1925 (as a squadron)
- Ceased operations: 27 March 2016 (merged with Rossiya)
- Hubs: Rostov-on-Don Airport
- Focus cities: Mineralnye Vody Airport; Moscow Domodedovo Airport; Sochi International Airport
- Frequent-flyer program: Aeroflot Bonus
- Alliance: SkyTeam (affiliate)
- Fleet size: 20
- Destinations: 20
- Parent company: Aeroflot (100%)
- Headquarters: Rostov-on-Don, Russia
- Key people: Mikhail Stepanovich Kritskiy (Director General)
- Website: aeroflot-don.ru

JSC "Donavia" (Russian: ОАО «Донавиа») was an Aeroflot subsidiary airline based in Rostov-on-Don, Russia. Its main bases were Rostov-on-Don Airport and Mineralnye Vody Airport after the Kavminvodyavia bankruptcy. It was known as Aeroflot-Don (Russian: ОАО «Аэрофлот-Дон») from 2000–2009. In the spring of 2016, its operations and aircraft were merged into sister company Rossiya.

== History ==
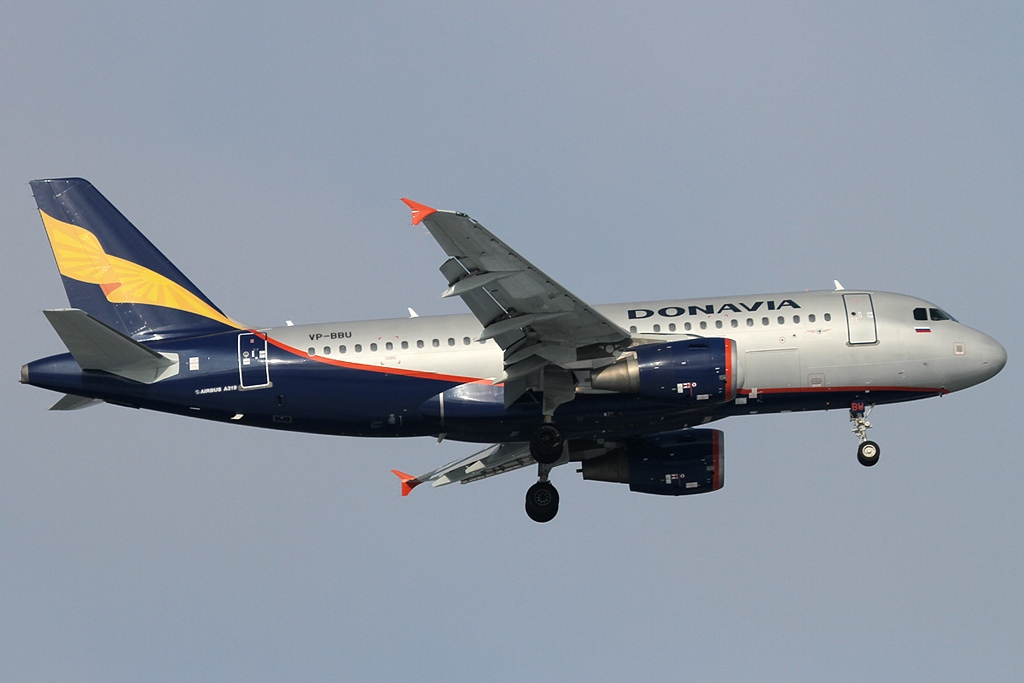
Donavia Airbus A319-100.

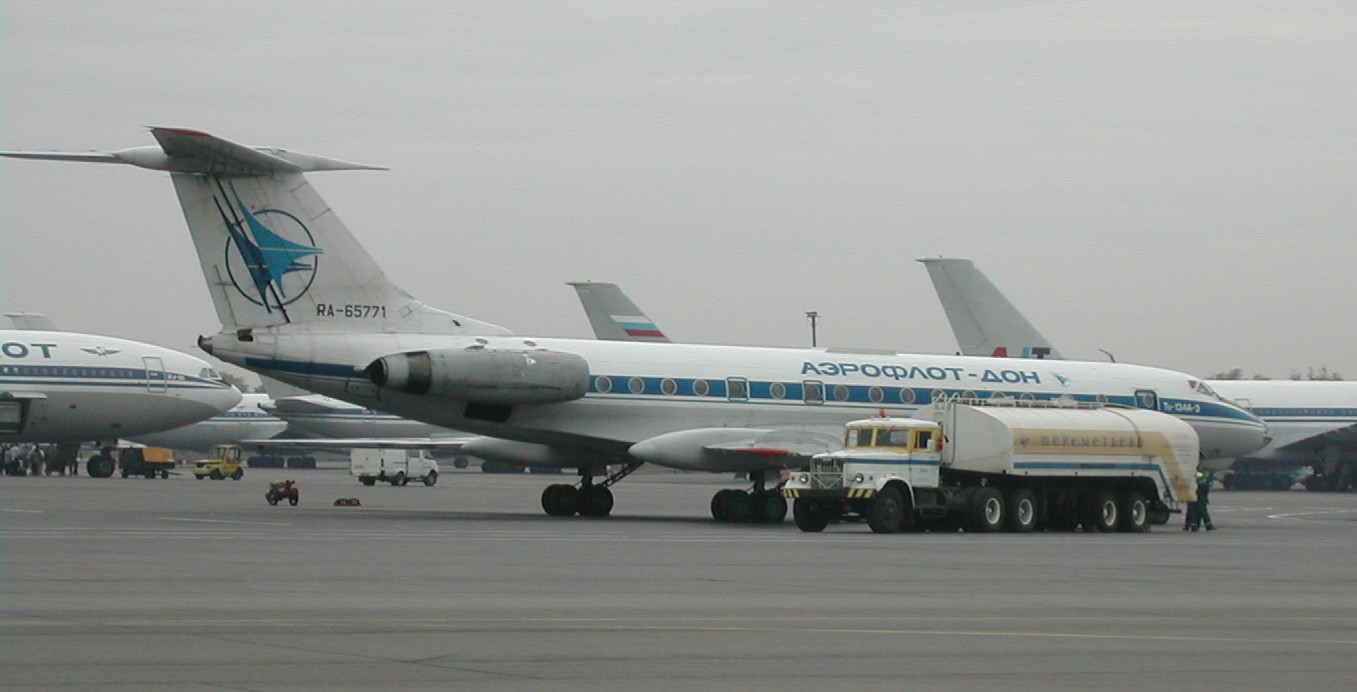
Aeroflot-Don Tupolev Tu-134 in 2006

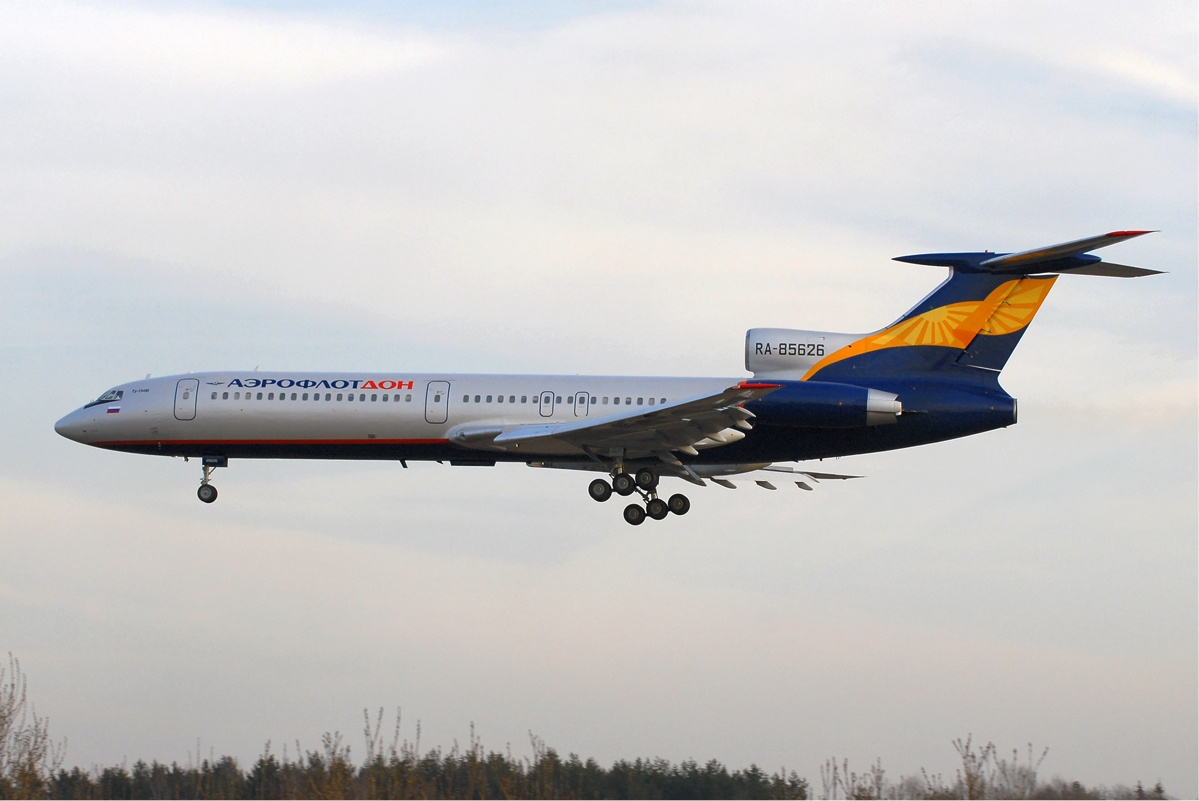
Aeroflot-Don Tupolev Tu-154 in 2008

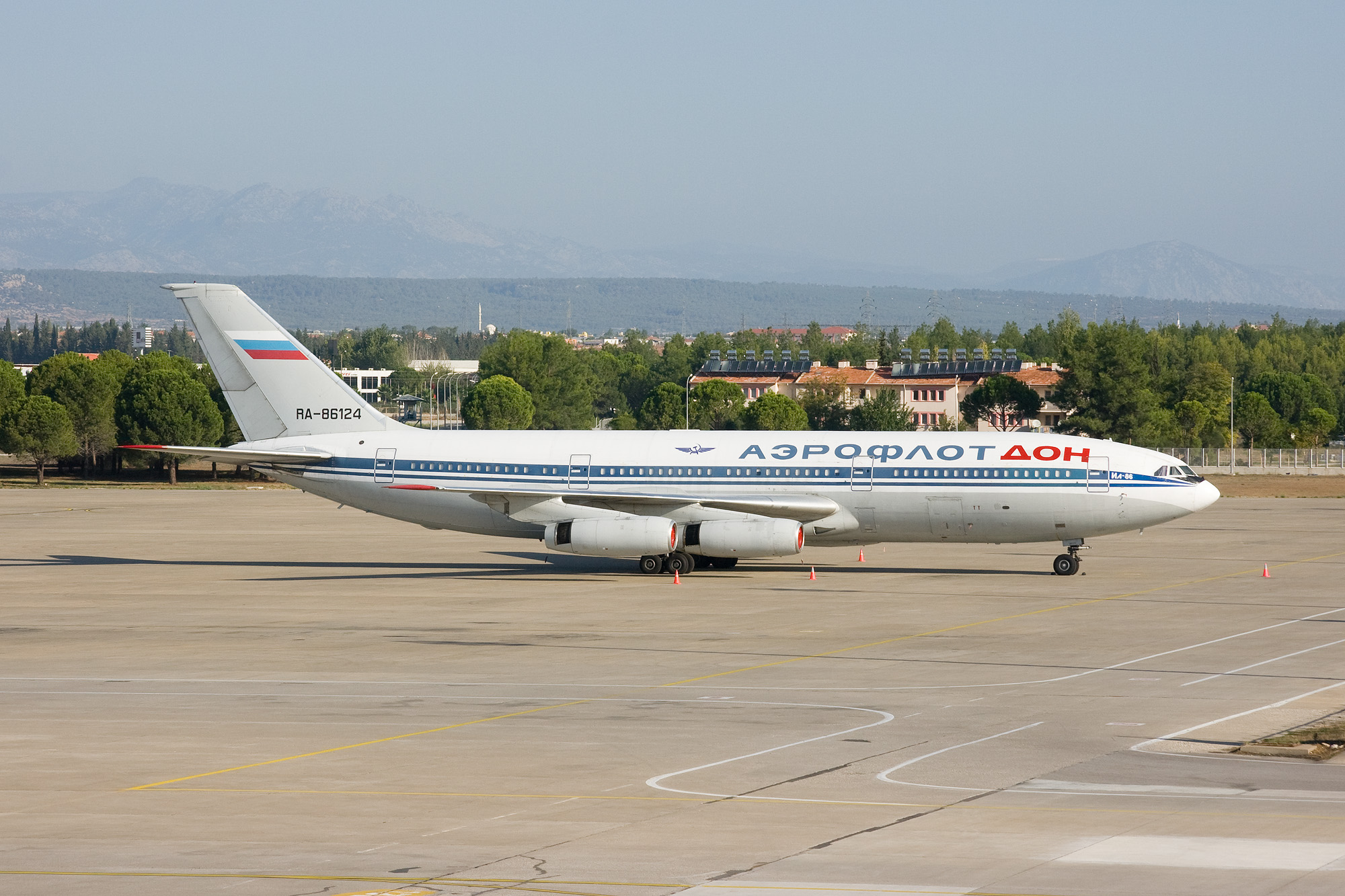
Aeroflot-Don Ilyushin Il-86 in 2008

The airline was established on 15 June 1925 as a squadron under the Soviet airline Aeroflot. Following the dissolution of the Soviet Union in 1991, it was rebranded as Don Airlines ("Donavia") in 1993. It absorbed the Rostov assets of Aeroflot, and was one of many such "Babyflots" to emerge in the early 1990s. However, the airline was purchased by Aeroflot in 2000 and began to operate as Aeroflot-Don on 13 April 2000. It operated scheduled domestic and international passenger flights as well as passenger and cargo charters, mostly to the Middle East and within Russia. On 25 September 2009, the airline reverted to the Donavia brand name and the airline adopted the Airbus A319-100 and operated for ten years until operations were folded into Rossiya Airlines in 2016.

== Destinations ==
Donavia served the following destinations before its merger with Rossiya:

=== Asia ===
==== Central Asia ====
Tajikistan

- Dushanbe – Dushanbe International Airport
- Khujand – Khujand Airport

Uzbekistan

- Tashkent – Tashkent International Airport

==== Western Asia ====
Armenia

- Yerevan – Zvartnots International Airport

Israel

- Tel Aviv – Ben Gurion International Airport

Turkey

- Antalya – Antalya Airport
- Istanbul – Istanbul Atatürk Airport

=== Europe ===
Russia

- Krasnodar – Krasnodar International Airport
- Mineralnye Vody – Mineralnye Vody Airport Focus City
- Moscow Focus City
  - Moscow Domodedovo Airport
  - Vnukovo International Airport
- Novosibirsk – Tolmachevo Airport
- Rostov-on-Don – Rostov-on-Don Airport Hub
- Saint Petersburg – Pulkovo Airport
- Sochi – Sochi International Airport Focus City
- Stavropol – Stavropol Shpakovskoye Airport
- Volgograd – Volgograd International Airport
- Yekaterinburg – Koltsovo Airport

Russia / Ukraine ^{*}

- Simferopol – Simferopol International Airport

^*The political status of Crimea is the subject of a political and territorial dispute between Russia and Ukraine.

== Fleet ==
In April 2016, the entire Donavia fleet was reassigned to Rossiya.

Donavia fleet as of 2015
aircraft	in service	orders
Airbus A319	10	0
Boeing 737-400	3	0
Boeing 737-500	7	0

Retired fleet

aircraft	introduced	retired
Ilyushin Il-86	unknown	unknown
Tupolev Tu-134	unknown	2008
Tupolev Tu-154	unknown	2009
