= Rossiya Airlines =

Airline of Russia

Rossiya Airlines АО Авиакомпания «Россия»

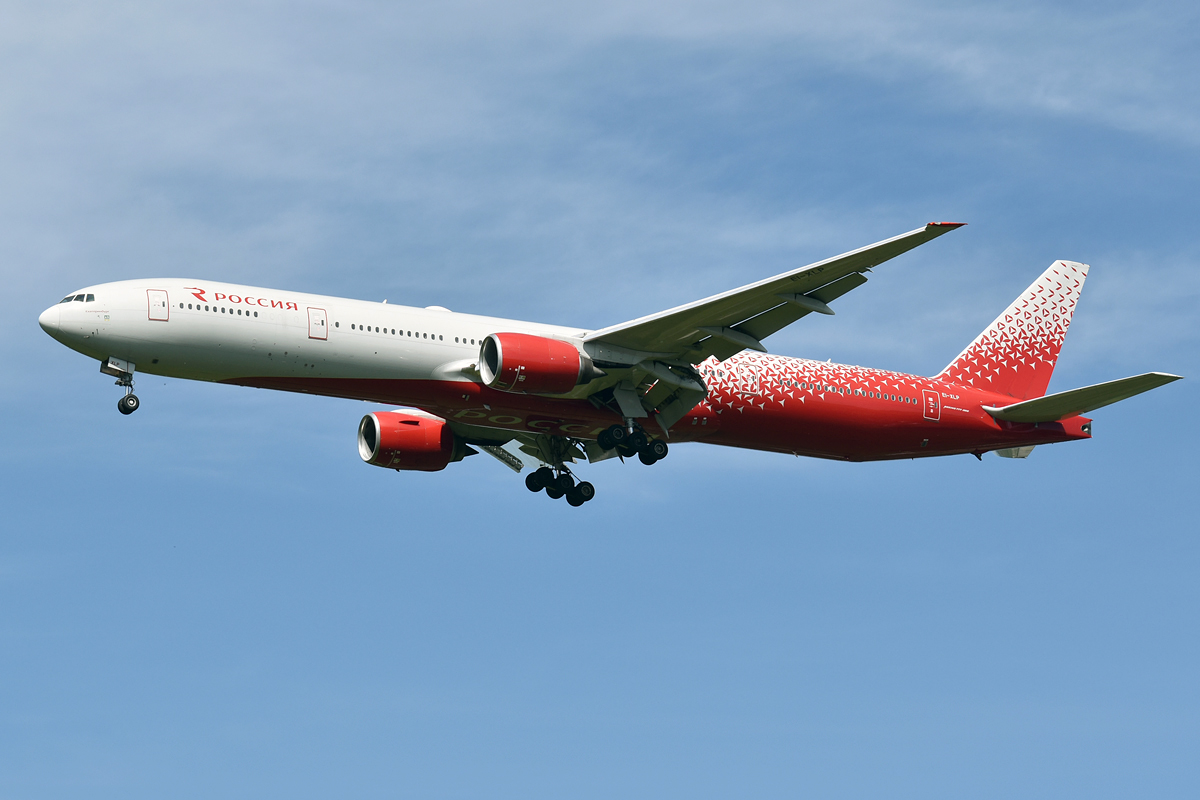
- A Rossiya Airlines Boeing 777-300
IATA	ICAO	Call sign
FV	SDM	ROSSIYA
- Founded: 7 May 1934 as Pulkovo Aviation Enterprise
- Commenced operations: 3 April 1992 as Rossiya Airlines
- Hubs: Moscow–Sheremetyevo; Saint Petersburg; Krasnoyarsk; Sochi
- Frequent-flyer program: Aeroflot Bonus
- Fleet size: 136 (as of July 2026)
- Destinations: 120
- Parent company: Aeroflot
- Headquarters: Saint Petersburg, Russia
- Key people: Jan Burg CEO
- Employees: 6,797 (as of 2024)
- Website: rossiya-airlines.ru

Rossiya Airlines (Russian: АО Авиакомпания «Россия», romanized: AO Aviakompaniya "Rossiya"), sometimes branded as Rossiya—Russian Airlines (Россия — Российские авиалинии, Rossiya — Rossyskiye avialinii) is one of the oldest and largest air carriers of Russia. It was founded on 7 May 1934. It is a part of Aeroflot Group. Rossiya is the largest and the base carrier of Pulkovo Airport (Saint Petersburg).

It is currently banned from flying into the European Union.

== History ==
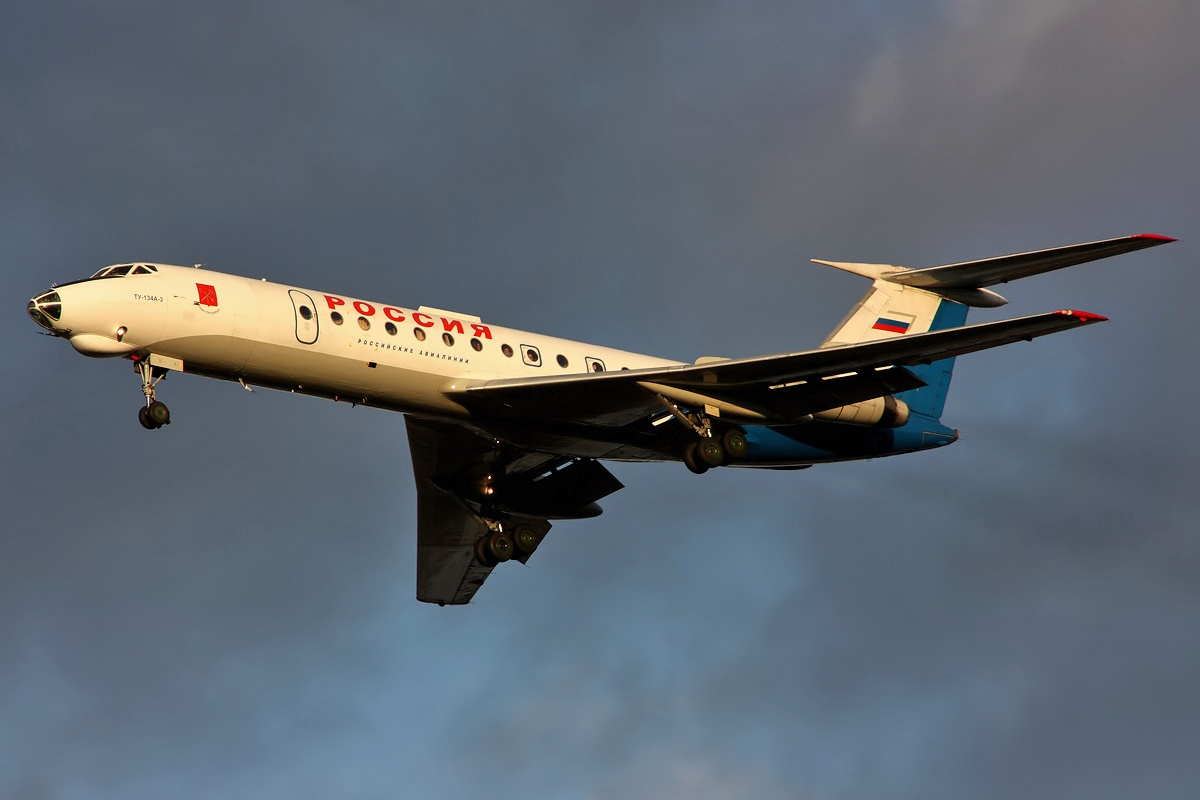
A former Rossiya Tu-134A-3 in the old livery

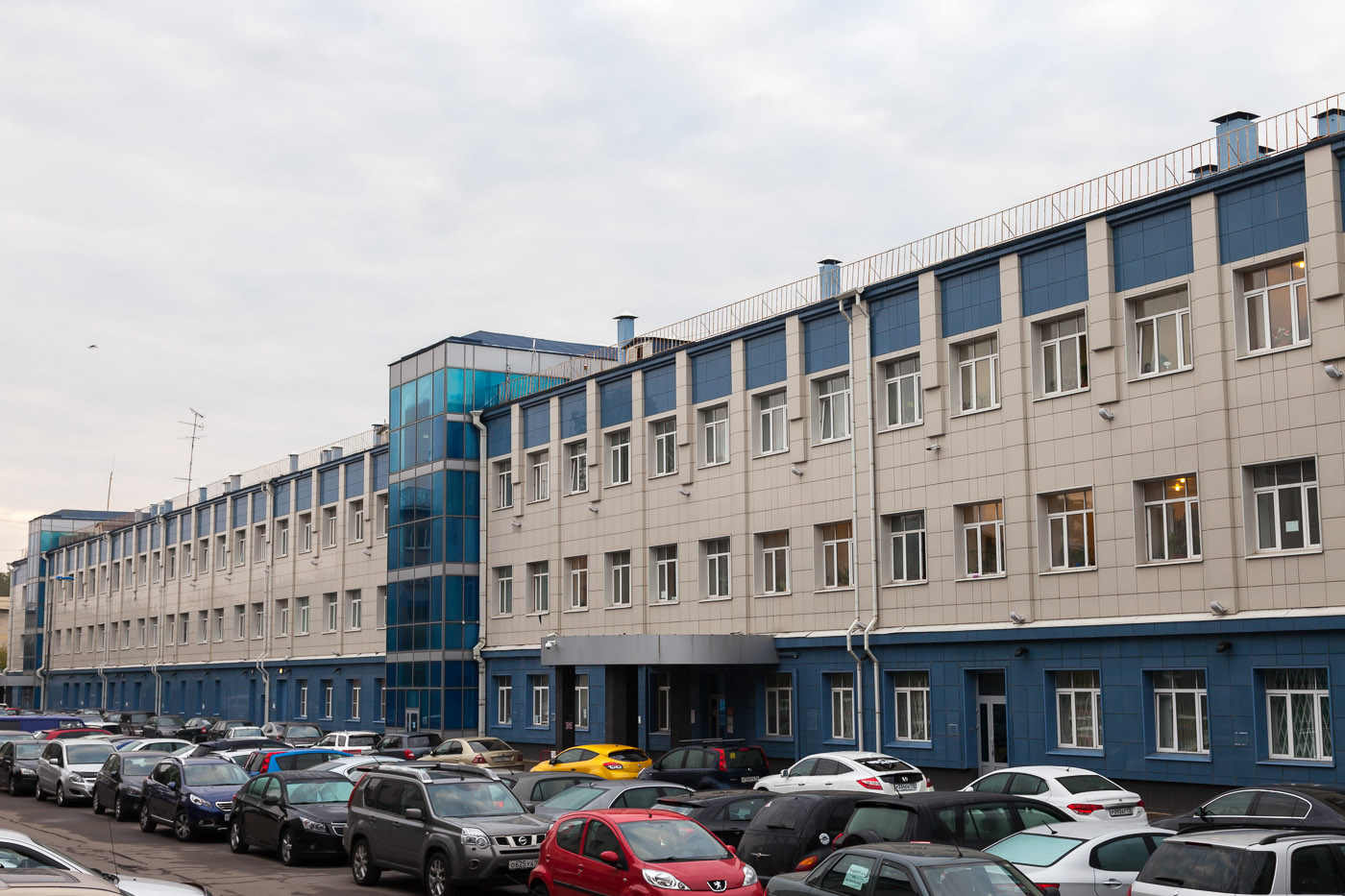
The head office of Rossiya

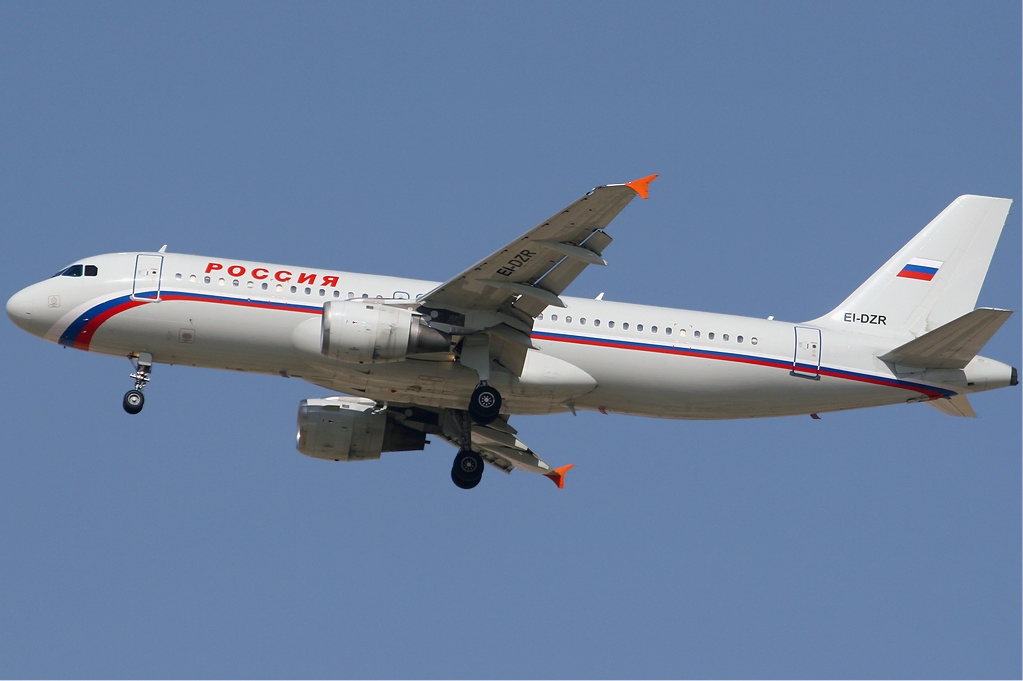
Rossiya Airlines Airbus A320-200 wearing the former livery in 2008

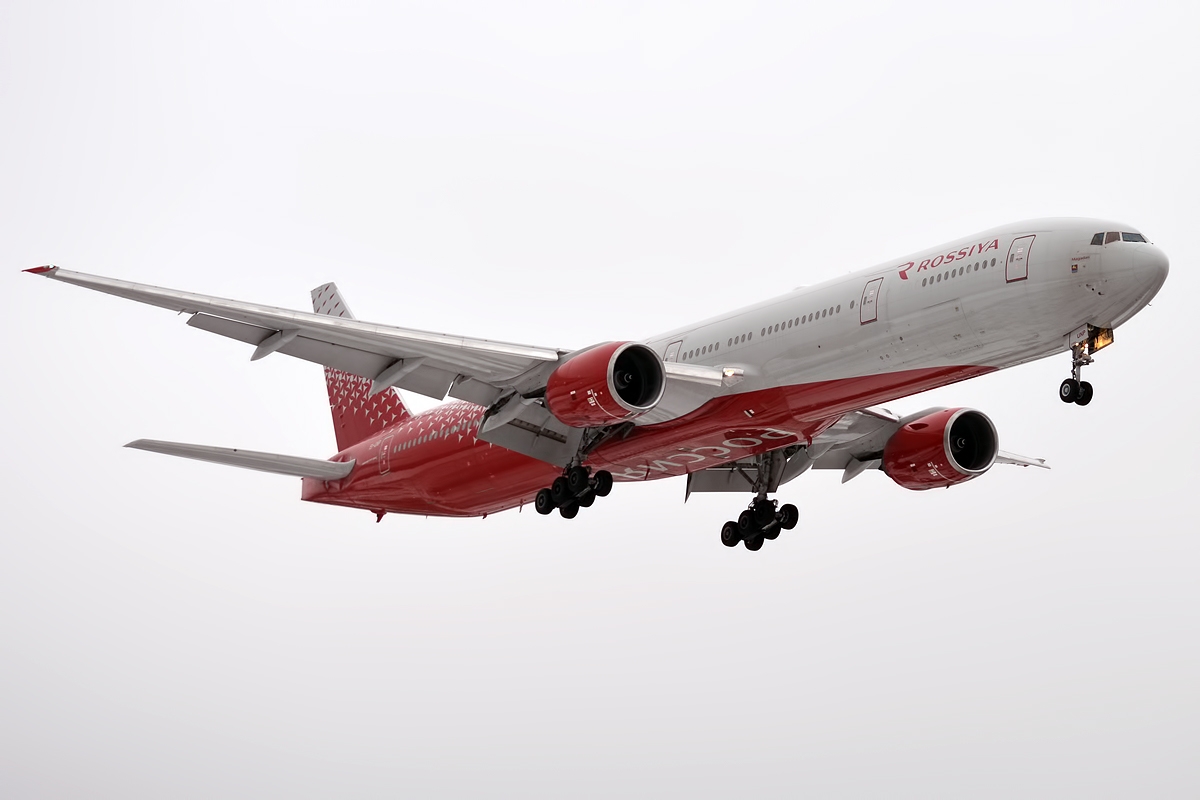
Rossiya Airlines Boeing 777-300

=== Merger with Pulkovo Aviation Enterprise ===
In November 2006, it was announced that the merger had been completed and Rossiya Airlines was registered in Saint Petersburg on 9 October 2006 and has a branch in Moscow and 54 offices in Russia and abroad.

=== Aeroflot Group ===
In February 2010, the Russian government announced that all state-owned regional airlines managed by holding company Rostec would be consolidated into flag carrier Aeroflot to increase financial viability.

On 16 November 2011, 75% minus 1 share of Rossiya Airlines JSC was transferred to Aeroflot. In December, 25% plus 1 share were donated to the Government of Saint Petersburg. In accordance with the decree of the city government of 23 December 2011, the main purpose of the transfer is to ensure the implementation of the powers of the executive bodies of Saint Petersburg to organize the development of the city's transport complex.

In December 2011, a decree was signed by the Government of Saint Petersburg on accepting a gift of 25% of the airline's shares from Rostec. 229,726 ordinary registered non-documentary shares were transferred to the city. The nominal value of one security is 1 thousand rubles. In total, Saint Petersburg has now become the owner of a blocking stake — 25% plus one voting share.

In 2014, the commercial management of Rossiya Airlines JSC was transferred to the parent company Aeroflot. Since the spring-summer schedule, flights of Rossiya Airlines have been operated under a single code for the Aeroflot Group of companies. Rossiya Airlines became a participant in the Aeroflot Bonus frequent-flyer programme.

=== Merger with Donavia and Orenair ===
In December 2015, Aeroflot Group announced the unification of its regional airline affiliates Rossiya, Donavia (based at Rostov-on-Don Airport) and Orenair (with hubs at Orenburg Tsentralny Airport and Moscow's Domodedovo International Airport) under the name Rossiya (the name of the largest of the three). The consolidation excluded Aurora, a small airline headquartered in Yuzhno-Sakhalinsk. Rossiya, Donavia and Orenair served 48 domestic and 42 international destinations; the new Rossiya will add some destinations served by Transaero Airlines prior to its collapse in October. As of the end of February 2016, the merger of the three airlines was completed and joined flights of three airlines started on 27 March of the same year. On 27 March 2016, Rossiya Airlines, Donavia and Orenair, which were subsidiaries of Aeroflot, were integrated under the Rossiya brand.

=== Rebranding ===
Simultaneously with the presentation of the updated company, the air carrier started the process of rebranding.

An element that looks like a blade is the basis of the corporate pattern of the aircraft livery. Its plastic and shape complement the company's logo. The element consists of modules that graphically repeat the image of the turbine. The pattern changes its density from the nose of the aircraft to its tail – it becomes more saturated, as if following the flow of air. This technique helps to convey the feeling of flight, movement, even when the plane is on the ground. The name of the airline is printed on the lower part of the fuselage in corporate font.

In April 2016, the airline introduced the first Boeing 747-400 in a new livery, named after Saint Petersburg.

=== 2022 sanctions ===
On 8 April 2022, the US Department of Commerce restricted flights on aircraft manufactured in the US for Aeroflot, Aviastar, Azur Air, Belavia, Rossiya and Utair. On 16 June the US broadened its restrictions on the six airlines after violations of the sanctions were detected. The effect of the restrictions is to ground the US-manufactured part of its fleet.

As of July 2022, Rossiya Airlines took over all Sukhoi Superjet 100 operations from parent Aeroflot.

== Destinations ==
The total route network of Rossiya Airlines includes more than 120 destinations, including socially significant and highly popular destinations to the cities of the Far East.

=== Codeshare agreements ===
Rossiya Airlines has codeshare agreements with the following airlines:

- Aeroflot
- Korean Air

=== Interline agreements ===
- Swiss International Air Lines (suspended)

== Fleet ==
As of August 2025, Rossiya Airlines operates the following aircraft

Aircraft	In service	Orders	Passengers				Notes
Aircraft	In service	Orders	F	J	Y	Total	Notes
Airbus A319-100	18	—	—	8	120	128	
Airbus A320-200	8	—	—	12	156	168	
Boeing 737-800	12	—	—	—	189	189	
Boeing 737-900ER	2	—	—	—	215	215	
Boeing 747-400	5	—	—	12	510	522	
Boeing 777-300	4	—	4	14	355	373	
Boeing 777-300ER	5	—	—	21	436	457	
Sukhoi Superjet 100-95B/LR	75	34	—	12	75	87	Largest operator worldwide. Entire fleet taken over from Aeroflot. Additional order of 34 in September 2023.
Sukhoi Superjet 100-95B/LR	75	34	—	—	100	100	Largest operator worldwide. Entire fleet taken over from Aeroflot. Additional order of 34 in September 2023.
Yakovlev MC-21-300	—	12	TBA				
Total	129	46					

=== Gallery ===
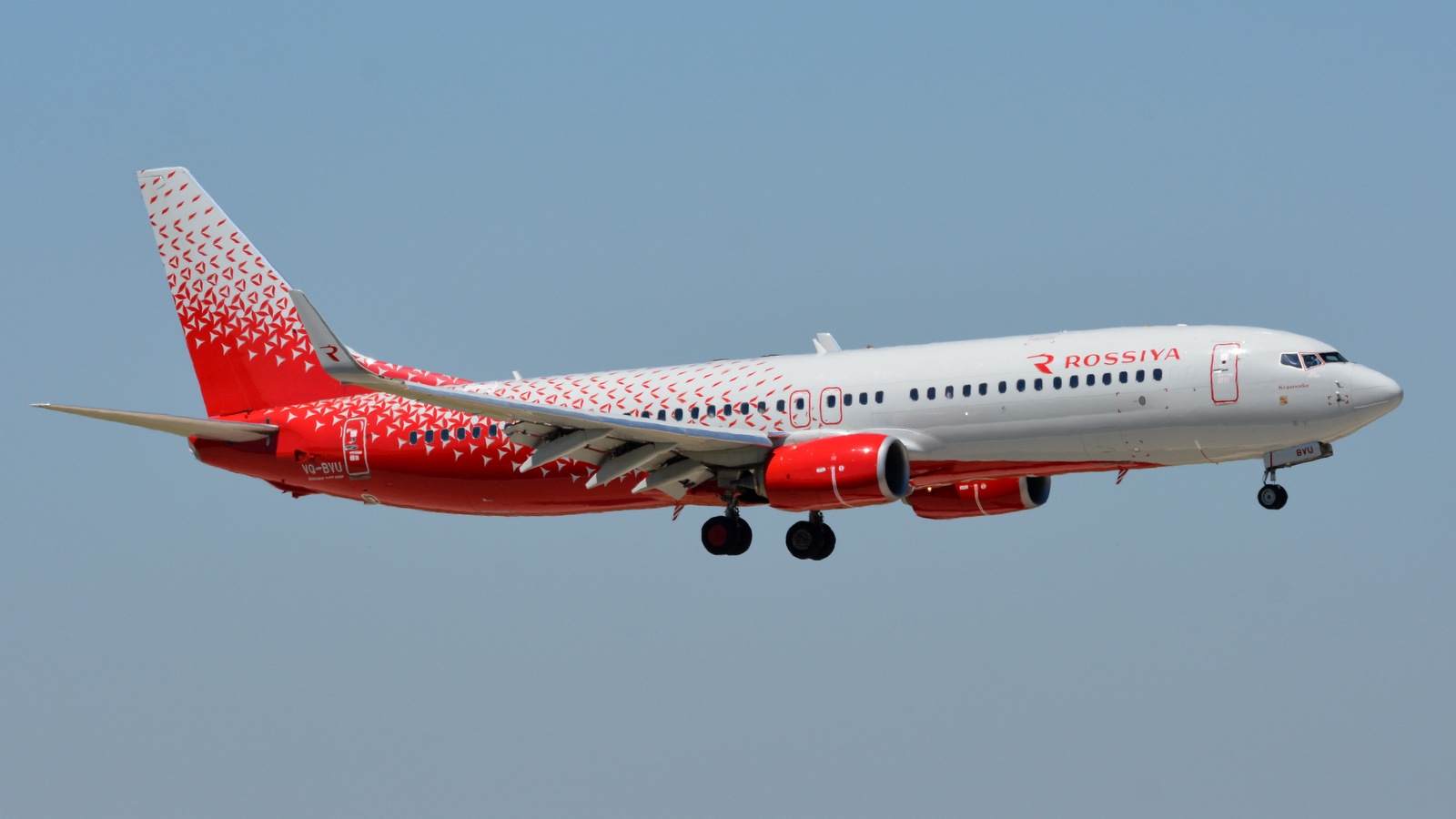
Boeing 737-800

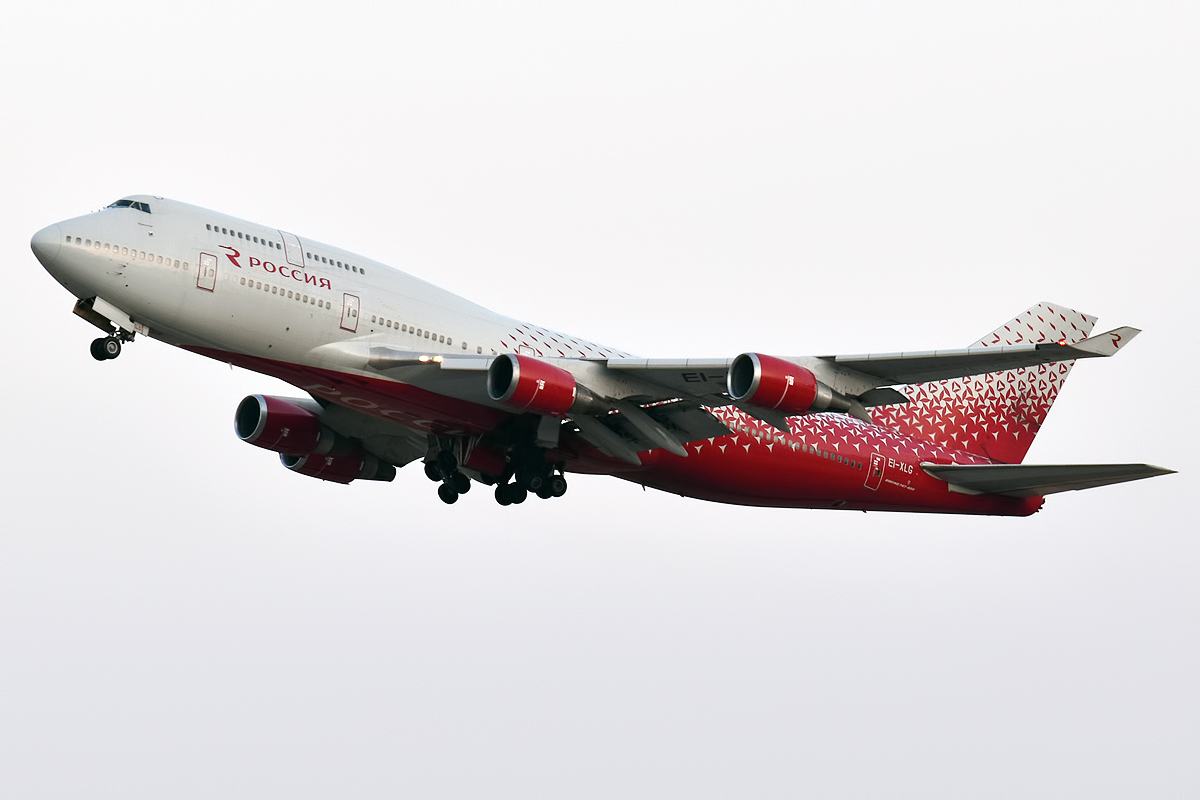
Boeing 747-400

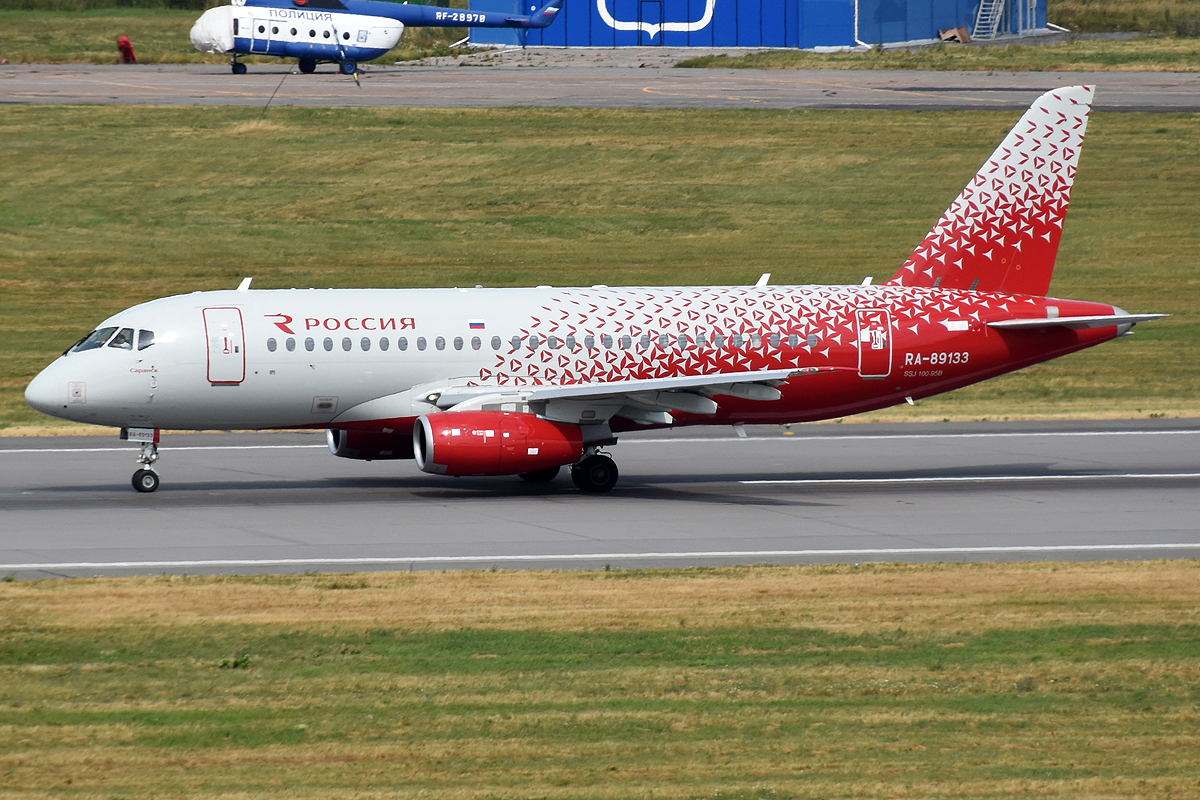
Sukhoi Superjet 100

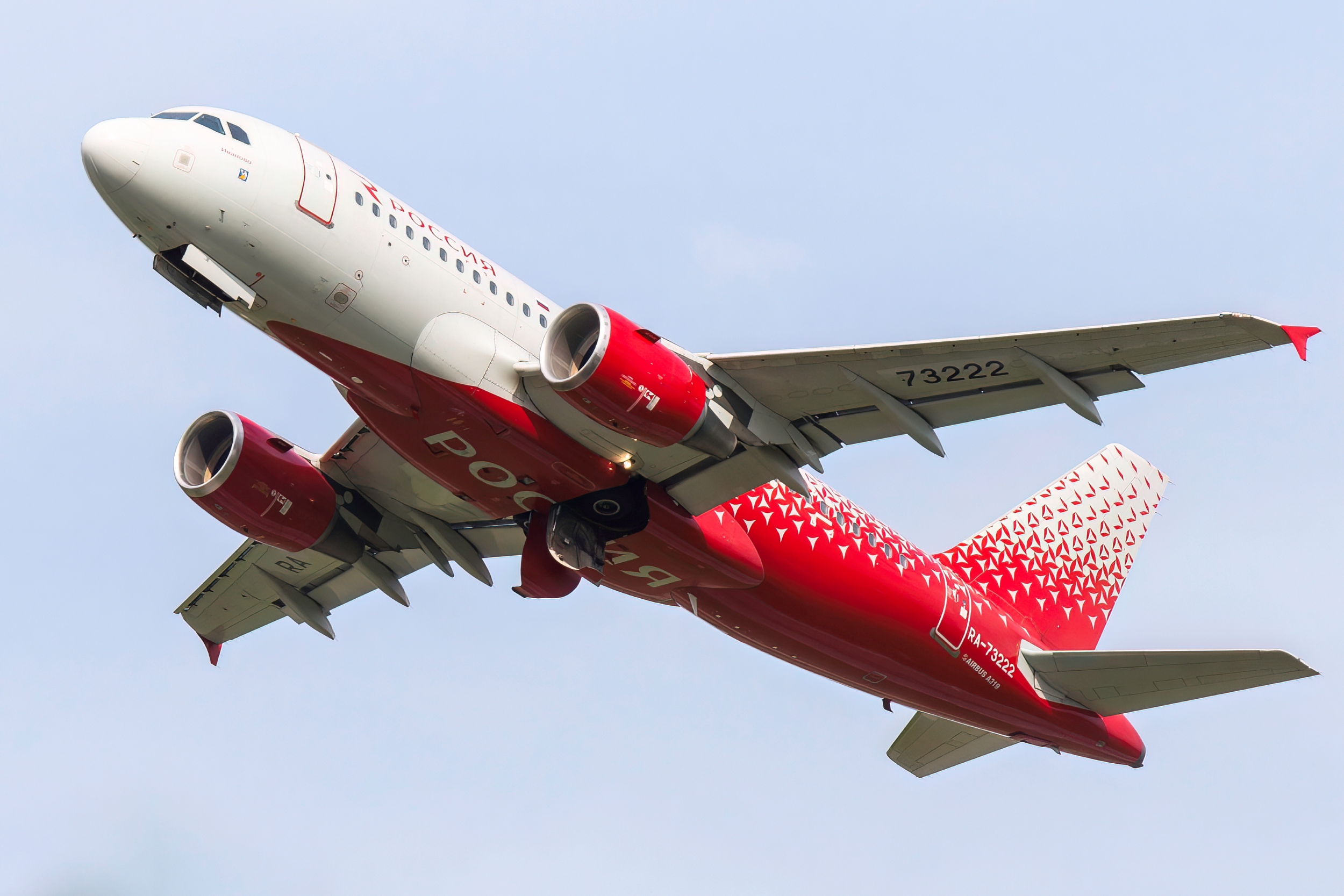
Airbus A319-100

== Partnership with FC Zenit ==
On 7 July 2014, Rossiya Airlines became the official carrier of Zenit Saint Petersburg football club. The solemn ceremony in connection was held at the Petrovsky Stadium – the home arena of Zenit. The airline has prepared a group of flight attendants to work on flights with the team. In addition, together with doctors and nutritionists, a special sports onboard food has been developed.

In addition to transporting football club players, the plane operates regular flights.

== Special projects ==
=== Zenitolet ===
In July 2014, Rossiya Airlines became the official carrier of Zenit Saint Petersburg football club. On October 29, 2014, the aircraft was delivered to the Netherlands for painting. On November 11 of the same year, the liner was presented at Pulkovo International Airport.

=== Care About Tigers/Tigrolet ===
In September 2016, Rossiya Airlines together with the Amur Tiger Center presented a Boeing 747-400 (EI-XLD, Ex.Japan Airlines JA8914) aircraft named after Yuzhno-Sakhalinsk in a special tiger livery. The goal of the project is to attract public attention to the conservation of populations of rare species of wild animals. The airliner operates the most popular routes to the cities of the Far East and popular resort destinations within Russia. The aircraft made its first flight on September 11 to Vladivostok.

=== Far Eastern (Amur) Leopard/Leolet ===
In February 2017, Rossiya Airlines unveiled Boeing 777-300 (EI-UNP, Ex.Singapore Airlines 9V-SYB) named after the city of Ussuriysk, featuring the muzzle of the Far Eastern (Amur) leopard, the rarest of all leopard subspecies. The aircraft performs flights on the most popular and socially significant routes to the cities of the Far East and popular domestic and international resorts.

=== Sportolet ===
On 29 May 2018, the airline received an Airbus A319 VQ-BCP Rostov-on-Don in a new exclusive livery dedicated to Russian sports. In June 2018, a competition to choose a name for the airliner in a new unique sports livery was announced on the airline's social network. During the week, the contestants offered more than 130 different names. The most popular was Sportolet.

=== Troika ===
In April 2022, Rossiya Airlines unveiled Sukhoi Superjet 100-95B (RA-89022) named after the city of Velsk in a new exclusive livery «Troika», which was timed to coincide with the Year of Cultural Heritage of the Peoples of Russia. The graphic element in the form of three racing harnessed horses is a tribute to the unique phenomenon of Russian culture and visually enhances the effect of flight.

=== Hermitage ===
In October 2023, Rossiya Airlines together with the State Hermitage Museum presented a new livery. The fuselage of the Superjet 100 (RA-89171) "Kaluga" carries a depiction of the figurine of a deer – a Scythian work of decorative and applied art and one of the symbols of the State Hermitage Museum. Efforts to promote the iconic objects of the Motherland will help in spreading knowledge about culture, art, and especially about the Hermitage's richest encyclopedic collection.

The Superjet 100 Hermitage aircraft is presented in a mono configuration (the total number of seats on board is 100).

=== 300th of St. Petersburg State University ===
In February 2024, Rossiya Airlines together with Saint Petersburg State University introduced a new livery. The anniversary logo of Saint Petersburg State University was applied to the fuselage of the Superjet 100 (RA-89142) ”Gatchina”. The exclusive livery is dedicated to the 300th anniversary of one of the oldest and leading universities in Russia. It is designed to draw attention to the university's rich history, educational and scientific achievements, technologies and innovations. The project reminds us that education is the embodiment of strength and power and can take us to incredible, never-before-seen heights.

=== Sambo ===
In April 2024, Rossiya Airlines introduced a special Superjet 100 (RA-89146) Ufa livery in honor of sambo, a unique domestic sport. The project was implemented in cooperation with the airline and the All-Russian Sambo Federation. The livery promotes the popularization of a healthy lifestyle among young people and the unity of the domestic audience, supports and inspires professionals and amateurs to new achievements.

The Superjet 100 Sambo aircraft is presented in a mono configuration (the total number of seats on board is 100).

=== The Movement of the First ===
In August 2024, Rossiya Airlines, in collaboration with the Russian children's and youth movement "The Movement of the First" unveiled a new livery on the Superjet 100 (RA-89131) aircraft named "Murom". This initiative is dedicated to the celebration of the Year of the Family, as the city of Murom is the birthplace of the Orthodox saints Peter and Fevronia of Murom, the patrons of family and marriage. Family is one of the core values of "The Movement of the First." The fuselage features the Movement's logo alongside iconic symbols of Russia: St. Basil's Cathedral, the Bronze Horseman, and the Crimean Bridge. This design represents the commitment of "The Movement of the First" to preserving Russia's traditional spiritual and moral values, the cultural heritage of past generations, and the development of modern Russia.

=== Livery for the 90th anniversary ===
In September 2024, Rossiya Airlines unveiled a new livery dedicated to the company's 90th anniversary. The fuselage of the Superjet 100 aircraft (RA-89185) named “Leningrad” features a logo inspired by the infinity symbol, representing the continuous movement of aircraft, the professional growth of employees, and the ongoing development of the airline.

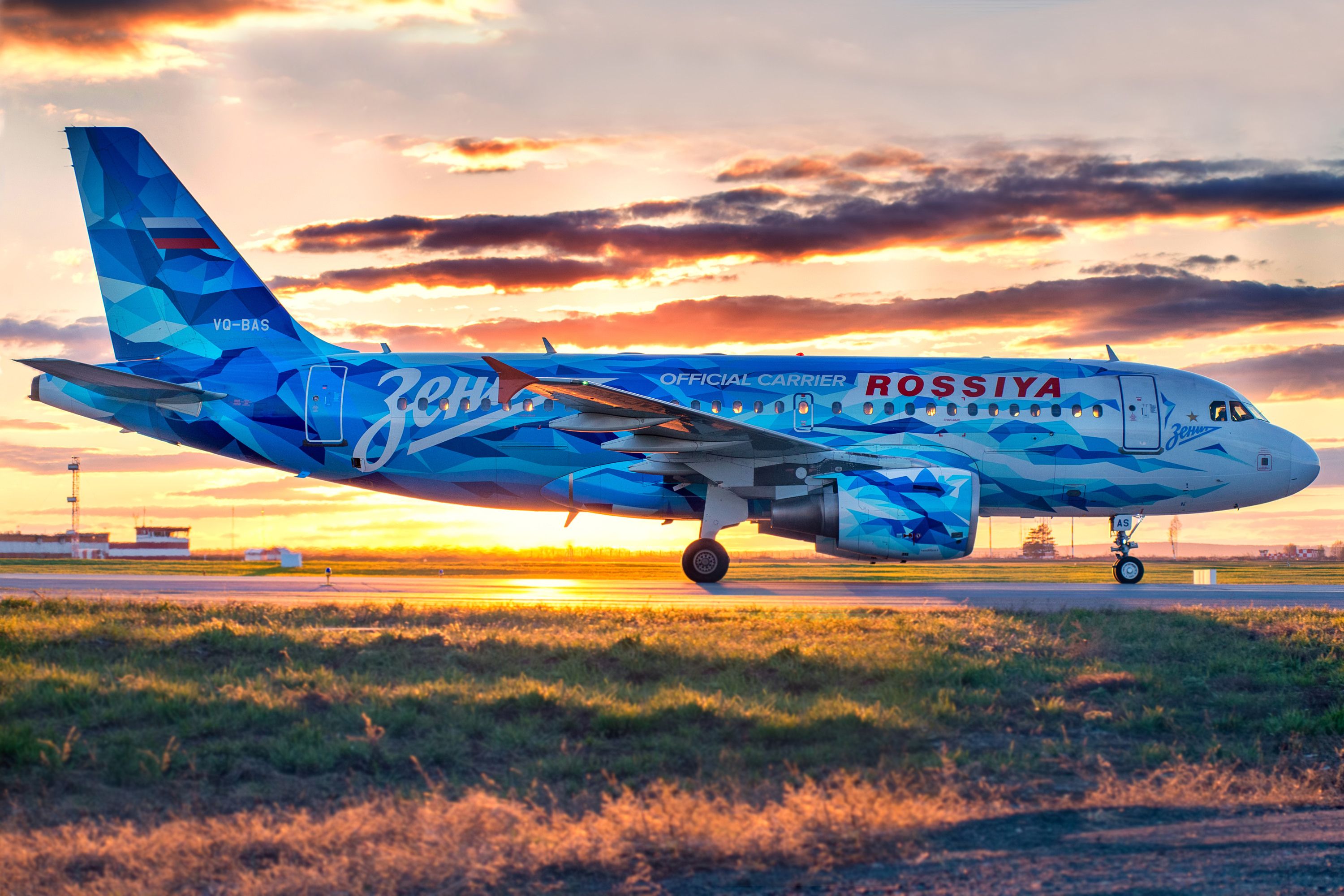
Rossiya Airlines Airbus A319 in Zenitolet livery

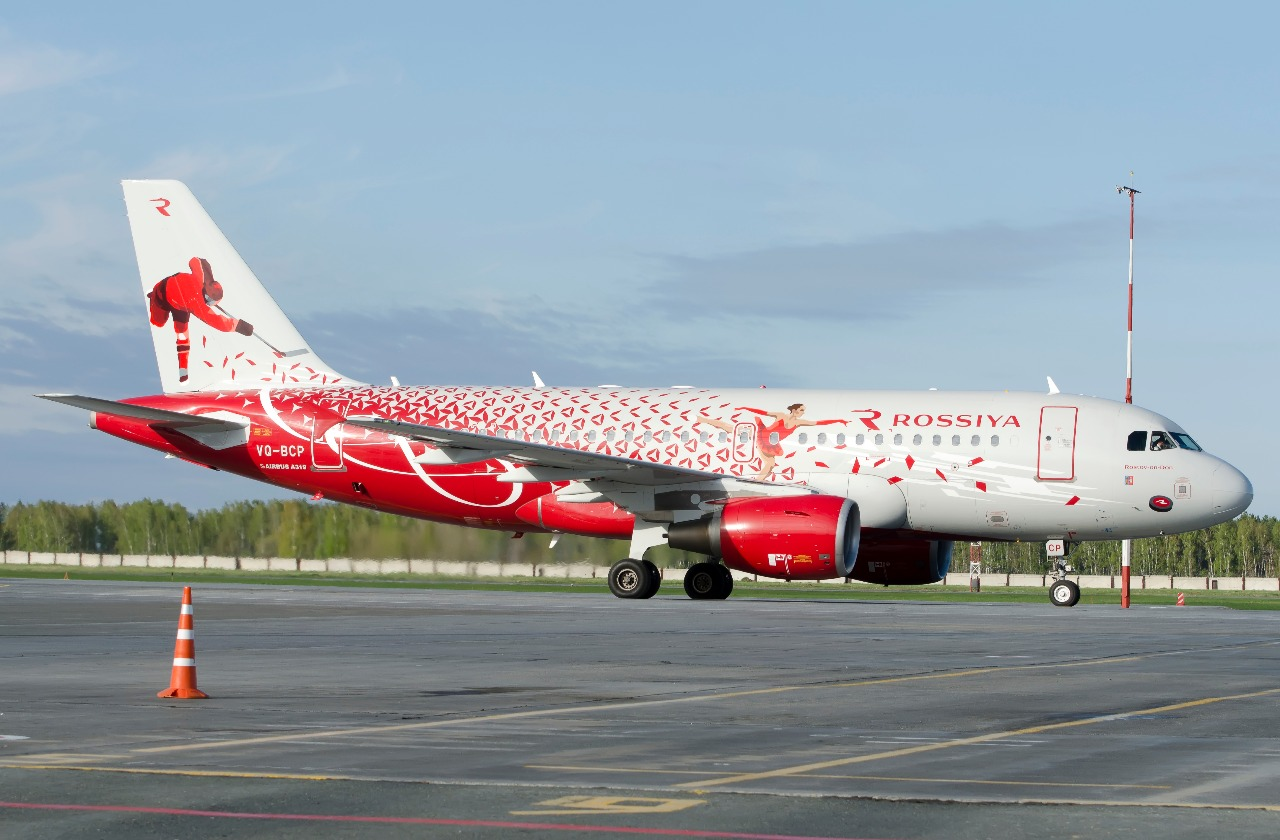
Rossiya Airlines Airbus A319 in Sportolet livery

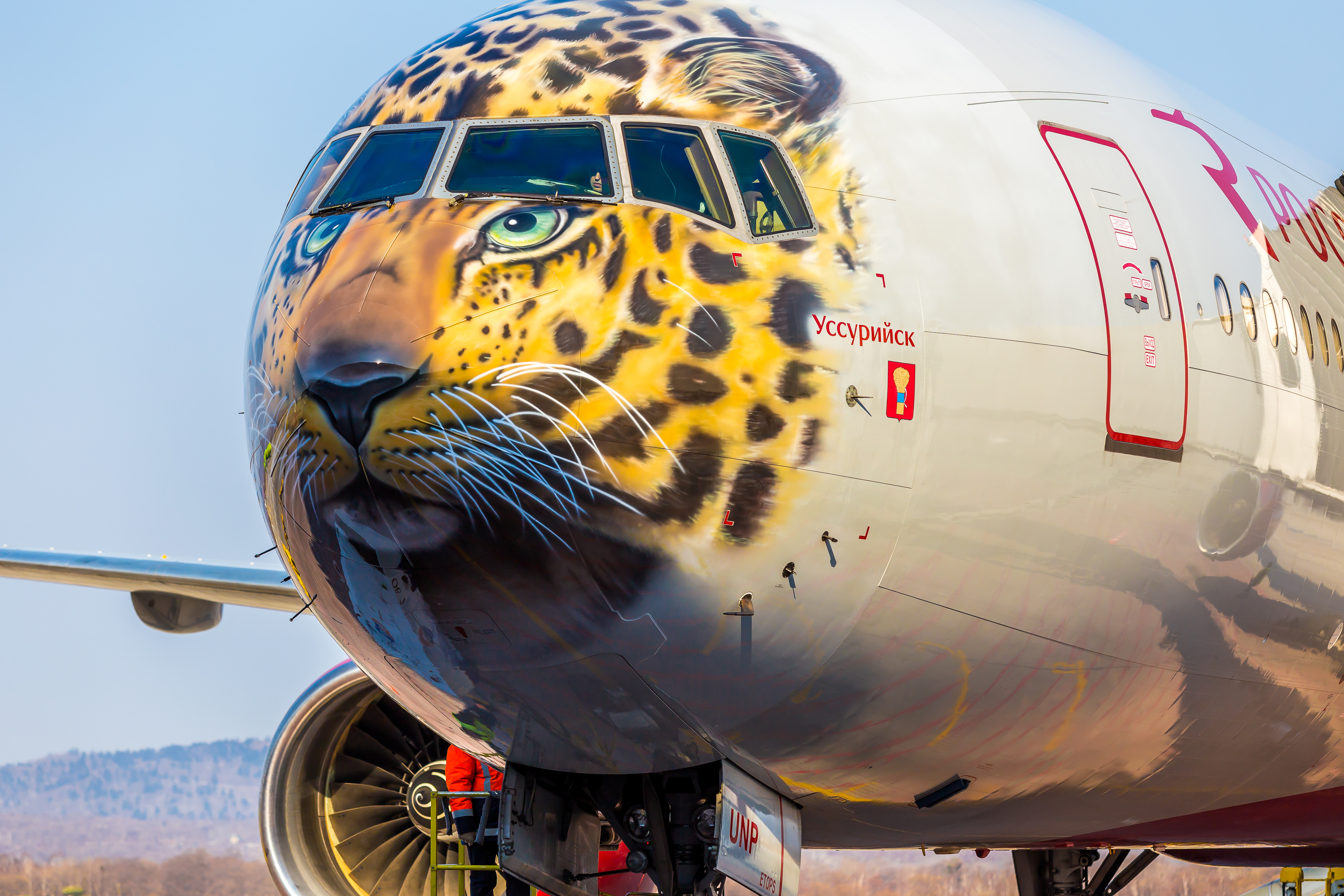
Rossiya Airlines Boeing 777 in Leolet livery

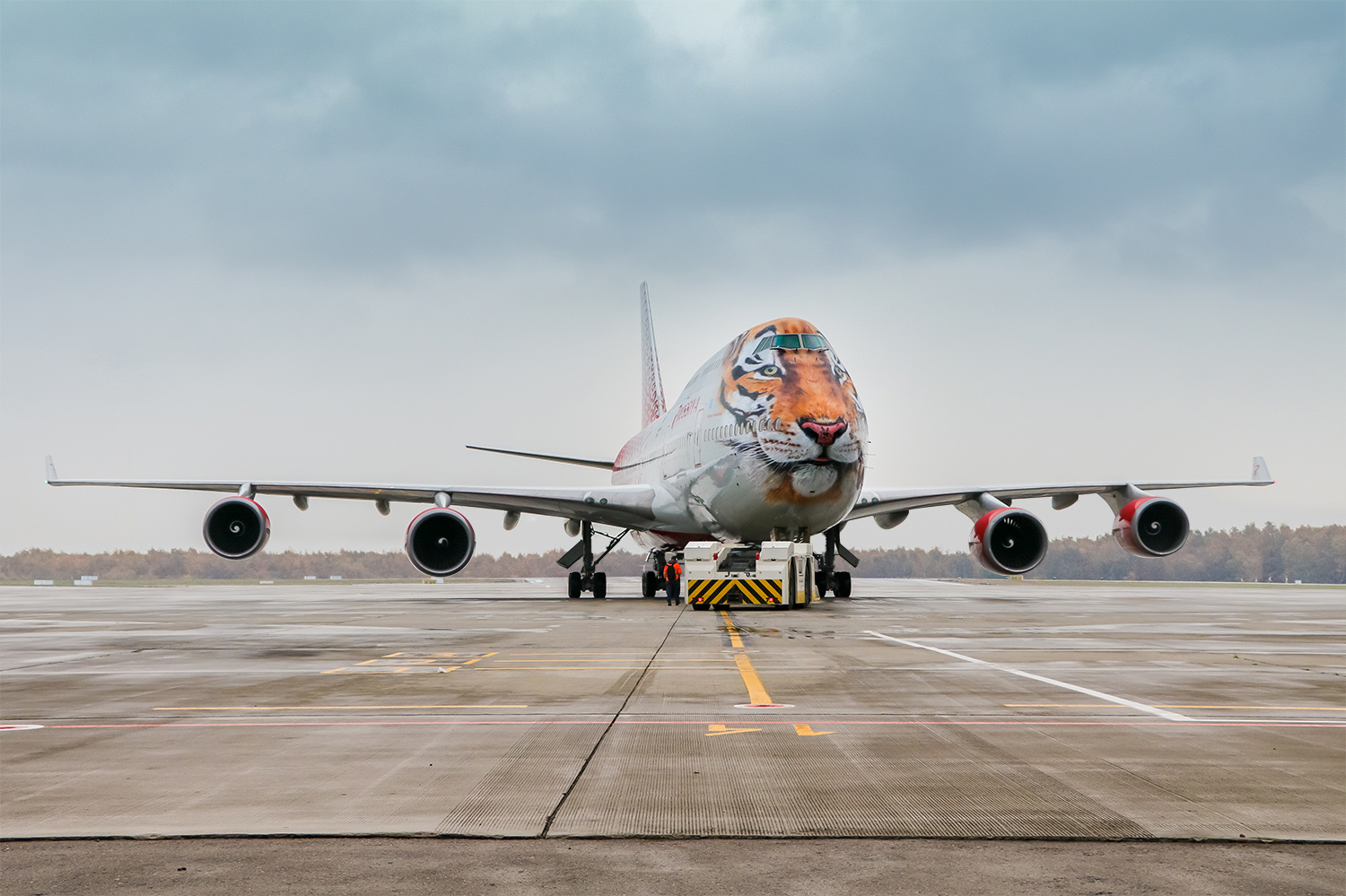
Rossiya Airlines Boeing 747 in Tigrolet livery

=== Accidents ===
On 22 January 2026, a Rossiya Boeing 747-446 suffered an engine surge on its left-most engine while preparing for take off, forcing the pilots to abort. The plane, taking off from Sokol Airport and bound for Moscow, was unable to stop within the runway and experienced a runway excursion. No injuries were reported from the incident.
