= Vologda (disambiguation) =

Vologda is a city in Russia. Vologda, Vologodsky may also refer to:

- Vologda (river), a river
- Vologda Oblast, a federal subject of Russia
- Vologodsky District, an administrative district of Vologda Oblast

== Historical ==
- Vologda Viceroyalty, an administrative division that existed from 1780 until 1796
- Vologda Governorate, an administrative division that existed from 1796 until 1929
- Vologda Oblast, Russian Empire, an administrative division of Vologda Viceroyalty
- Vologda electoral district (Russian Constituent Assembly election, 1917), a constituency (1917)

== Railway stations ==
- Vologda I railway station
- Vologda II railway station
- Vologda-Pristan railway station

== Sport ==
- Chevakata Vologda, a women's basketball club
- FC Dynamo Vologda, a football club
- FC Vologda, a football team

== Other ==
- Vologda butter, a type of butter
- Vologda Airport
- Vologda Aviation Enterprise, an airline
- Vologda State Technical University, a technical university
- Diocese of Vologda, an eparchy of the Russian Orthodox Church

== See also ==
- List of rural localities in Vologda Oblast
