= KSZ =

KSZ or ksz may refer to:

- KSZ, the IATA code for Kotlas Airport, Arkhangelsk Oblast, Russia
- KSZ, the ICAO code for Sunrise Airways, Haiti
- ksz, the ISO 639-3 code for Kodaku language, India
- Kyōryū Sentai Zyuranger, a Japanese tokusatsu series
