= Botovo =

Botovo may refer to:

- Botovo, Croatia, a settlement in Drnje Municipality of Koprivnica-Križevci County, Croatia
- Botovo, Russia, name of several rural localities in Russia
