= Flight 372 =

Flight 372 may refer to:

- Ethiopian Airlines Flight 372, crashed on 15 July 1960
- Dagestan Airlines Flight 372, crashed on 4 December 2010
