= Veliky Ustyug Airport =

Velikiy Ustyug
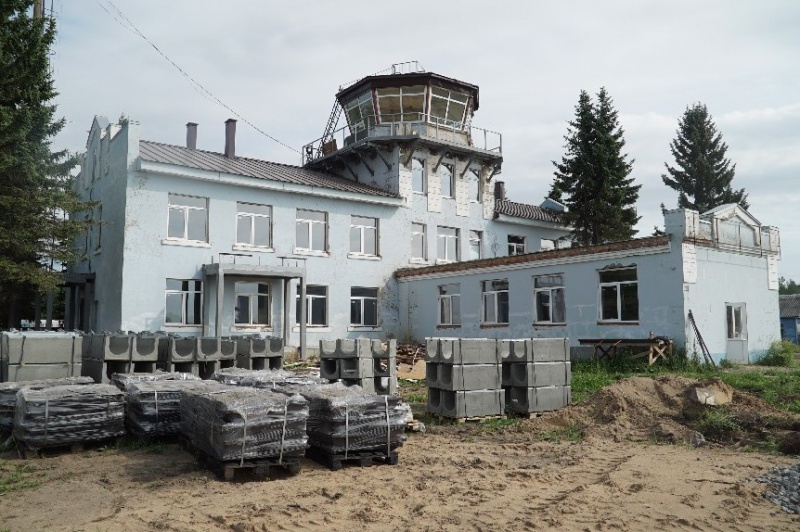
- IATA: VUS; ICAO: ULWU

Summary
- Airport type: Public
- Location: Velikiy Ustyug
- Elevation AMSL: 331 ft / 101 m
- Coordinates: 60°47′18″N 046°15′36″E
- Interactive map of Velikiy Ustyug

Runways
Direction	Length		Surface
Direction	ft	m	Surface
02/20	4,199	1,280	Concrete

Velikiy Ustyug Airport (IATA: VUS, ICAO: ULWU) is an airport in Russia located 2 km (1.2 mi) north of Velikiy Ustyug. It is a small civilian airfield with a parking apron and a few buildings.

The airport can accept only small aircraft. There is occasional passenger service to Vologda. The bigger Kotlas Airport is 72 kilometres (45 mi) away.

There were plans to reconstruct Veliky Ustyug Airport, making it an international airport and accessible for large aircraft.

== Airlines and destinations ==
Airlines	Destinations
Severstal Avia	Cherepovets
Vologda Aviation Enterprise	Vologda

== See also ==
- List of airports in Russia
