= Uytash Airport =

Airport in Russia

Makhachkala International Airport "Uytash" Махачкалинский международный аэропорт "Уйташ"
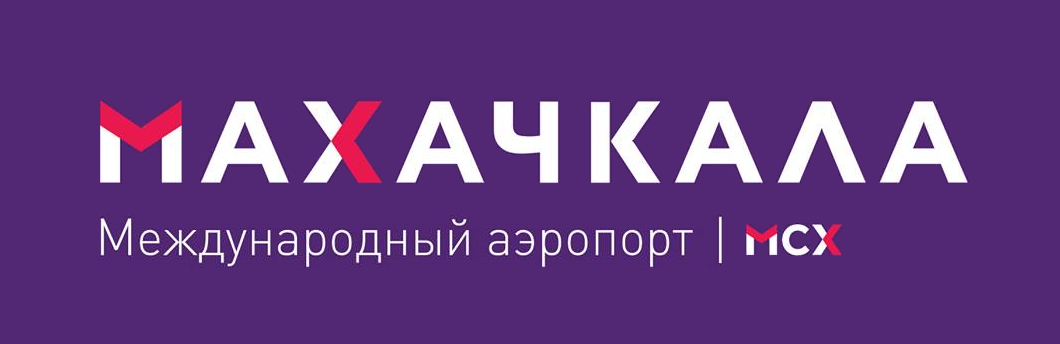

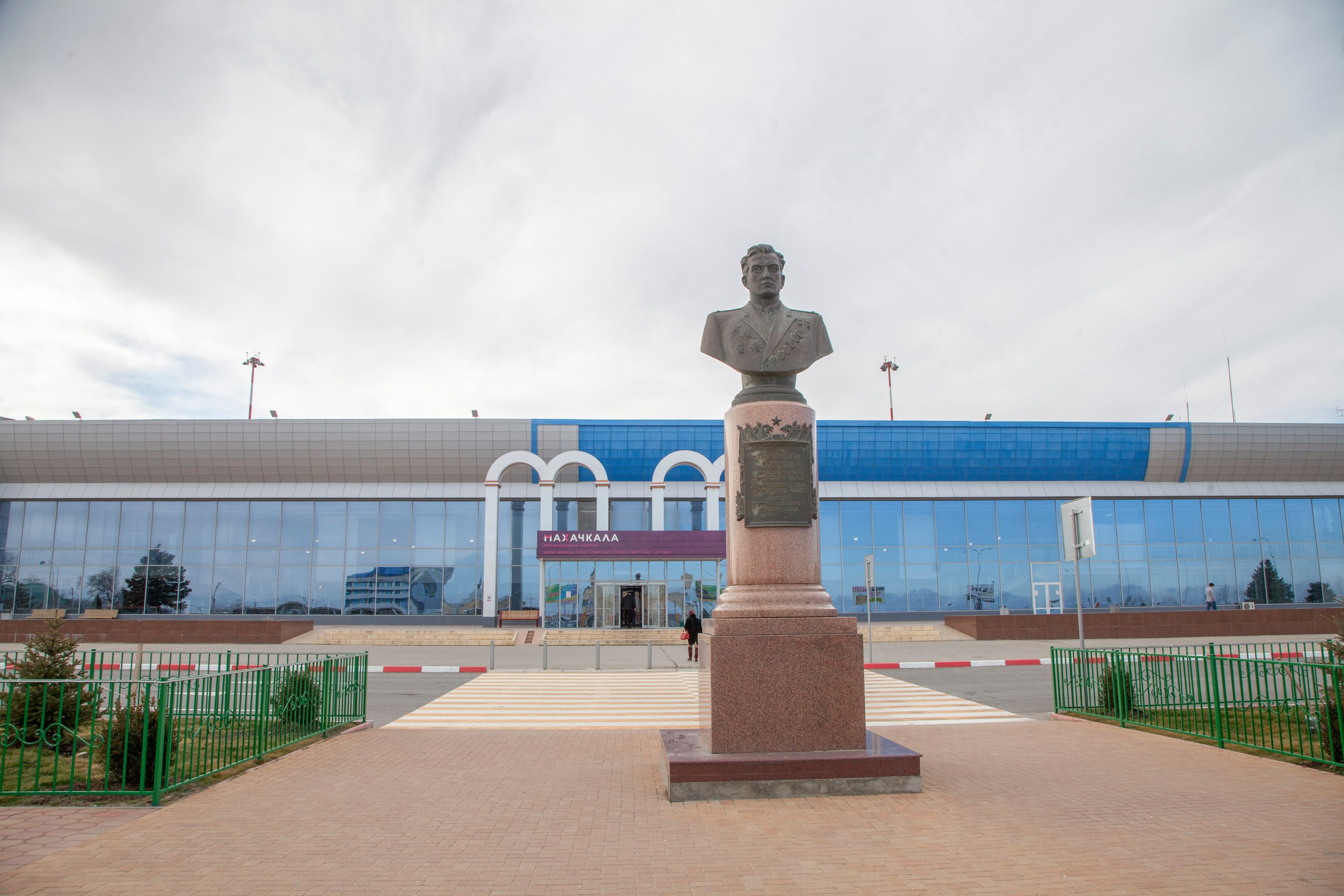
- IATA: MCX; ICAO: URML

Summary
- Airport type: Public
- Owner: Russian Federation
- Operator: Civil Government
- Serves: Makhachkala
- Location: Makhachkala, Dagestan Republic, Russia
- Time zone: Moscow Time (+4)
- Elevation AMSL: 12 ft (3.7 m)
- Coordinates: 42°49′00.56″N 47°39′08.26″E
- Website: www.mcx.aero

Map
- Location of the airport in Dagestan Location of the airport in Russia Location of the airport in Europe

Runways
Direction	Length		Surface
Direction	m	ft	Surface
14/32	2,640	8,662	Concrete

Statistics (2018)
- Passengers: 1,290,000
- Sources: Russian Federal Air Transport Agency (see also provisional 2018 statistics)

Makhachkala Uytash Airport (Russian: Аэропорт Махачкала Уйташ) (IATA: MCX, ICAO: URML) is a civil airport located near Makhachkala and just south of the city of Kaspiysk which is on the west side of the Caspian Sea. It is named after Amet-khan Sultan, World War II fighter pilot, twice Hero of the Soviet Union. The naming was found controversial by the Crimean Tatars, with whom Amet-khan openly affiliated, as an attempt to detatarize his origins.

South East Airlines (formerly Dagestan Airlines) had its head office on the property of the airport.

== Airlines and destinations ==
Airlines	Destinations
Aeroflot	Moscow–Sheremetyevo; Seasonal: Cheboksary
Azimuth	Jeddah, Mineralnye Vody, Perm, Sochi
Belavia	Seasonal: Minsk
Flydubai	Dubai–International
Ikar	Izhevsk, Kirov, Nizhnekamsk
IrAero	Seasonal: Sochi
NordStar	Moscow–Domodedovo
Nordwind Airlines	Kazan, Ufa; Seasonal: Moscow–Sheremetyevo, Perm, Saint Petersburg, Surgut
Pobeda	Abu Dhabi, Dubai–Al Maktoum, Istanbul, Moscow–Sheremetyevo, Moscow–Vnukovo, Saint Petersburg, Surgut
Red Wings Airlines	Bishkek, Bukhara, Chelyabinsk, Dushanbe, Krasnodar Moscow–Zhukovsky, Namangan, Novy Urengoy, Osh, Saint Petersburg, Samara, Saratov, Sharjah, Tashkent, Tyumen, Urgench, Volgograd, Yekaterinburg, Yerevan; Seasonal: Naryan-Mar; Seasonal charter: Sharm El Sheikh
Rossiya Airlines	Krasnoyarsk–International, Saint Petersburg
S7 Airlines	Moscow–Domodedovo
SCAT Airlines	Aqtau
Severstal Avia	Cherepovets; Seasonal: Petrozavodsk, Ulyanovsk–Baratayevka
Smartavia	Moscow–Sheremetyevo
Ural Airlines	Antalya, Moscow–Domodedovo
Utair	Moscow–Vnukovo
Uzbekistan Airways	Tashkent

== Accidents and incidents ==
- On 15 January 2009, 4 people died when two Ilyushin Il-76 aircraft collided and caught fire.
- On 4 December 2010, South East Airlines Flight 372, a Tupolev Tu-154M carrying 160 passengers and 8 crew en route to Makhachkala, crash landed at Domodedovo International Airport, Moscow, due to all engines failing. Two of the 160 passengers died.
- On 29 October 2023, a violent mob stormed the tarmac as a Red Wings Airlines flight from Tel Aviv, Israel arrived. Protestors shouted anti-Israel slogans and attempted to board the plane but were not successful. Eventually, authorities closed the airport and diverted flights to nearby cities. This event, sparked by false rumors about the arrival of Israeli refugees, occurred against the backdrop of further anti-Jewish unrest in the North Caucasus. Local authorities blamed the Morning of Dagestan channel on Telegram, as well as Ukraine and Ilya Ponomarev, for organizing the mob and "destabilising the situation in Dagestan by stirring up interethnic and interreligious hatred come from our enemy, the foes of our country". Ponomarev denied any connection to the Morning of Dagestan, while Morning of Dagestan itself attributed the story of their connection to Ponomarev to "FSB mad dogs" as well as confusion between the Morning of Dagestan channel and Ponomarev's February Morning channel.

== See also ==
- List of the busiest airports in Russia
- List of the busiest airports in Europe
- List of the busiest airports in the former USSR
