= Dagestan Airlines =

Airline in Russia

IATA	ICAO	Call sign
N2	DAG	DAGAL
- Founded: 1994
- Ceased operations: 19 December 2011
- Hubs: Uytash Airport
- Fleet size: 5
- Destinations: 6
- Headquarters: Uytash Airport; Makhachkala, Dagestan, Russia
- Website: www.dagair.ru

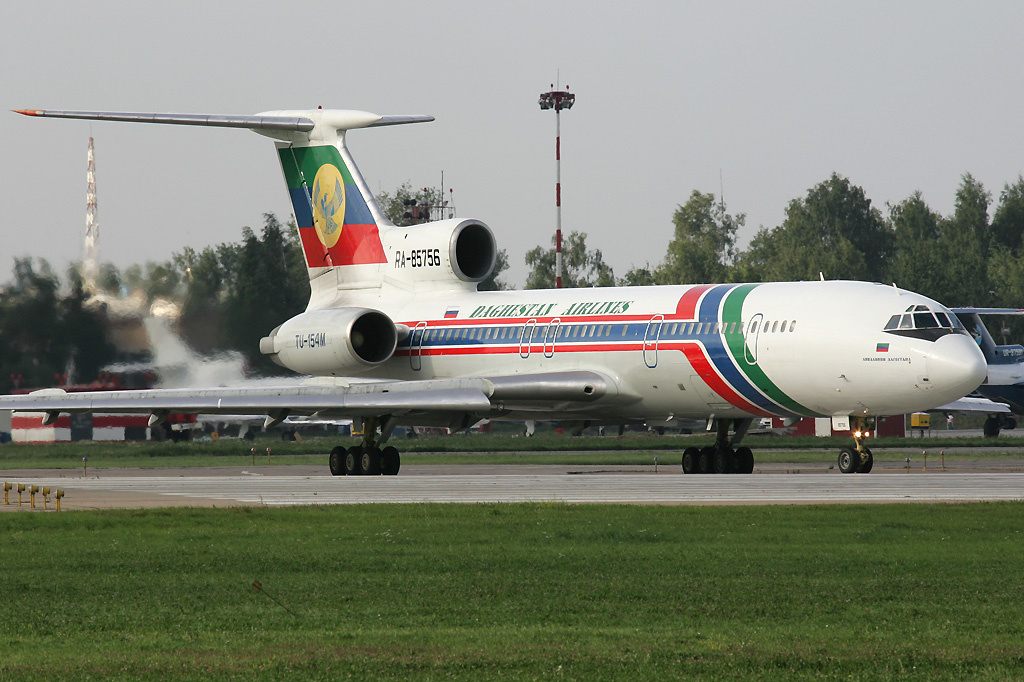
A Dagestan Airlines Tupolev Tu-154 at Vnukovo International Airport (2006).

OJSC Dagestan Airlines (Russian: ОАО Авиалинии Дагестана) was an airline based at Uytash Airport in Makhachkala, Dagestan, Russia, operating domestic and international scheduled and chartered flights.

== History ==
The roots of the airline can be traced back to February 1927, when an Aeroflot department serving the Makhachkala region of the Soviet Union was founded. In 1994, following the split-up of Aeroflot, it became and independent company known as Makhachkala Air Enterprise. In 1996, the company was rebranded as Dagestan Airlines. In March 2007, it had 809 employees.

From 2010 onwards, the South East Airlines branding was introduced. On 19 December 2011, the airline had its licence revoked but the airline said they would appeal the decision.

== Destinations ==
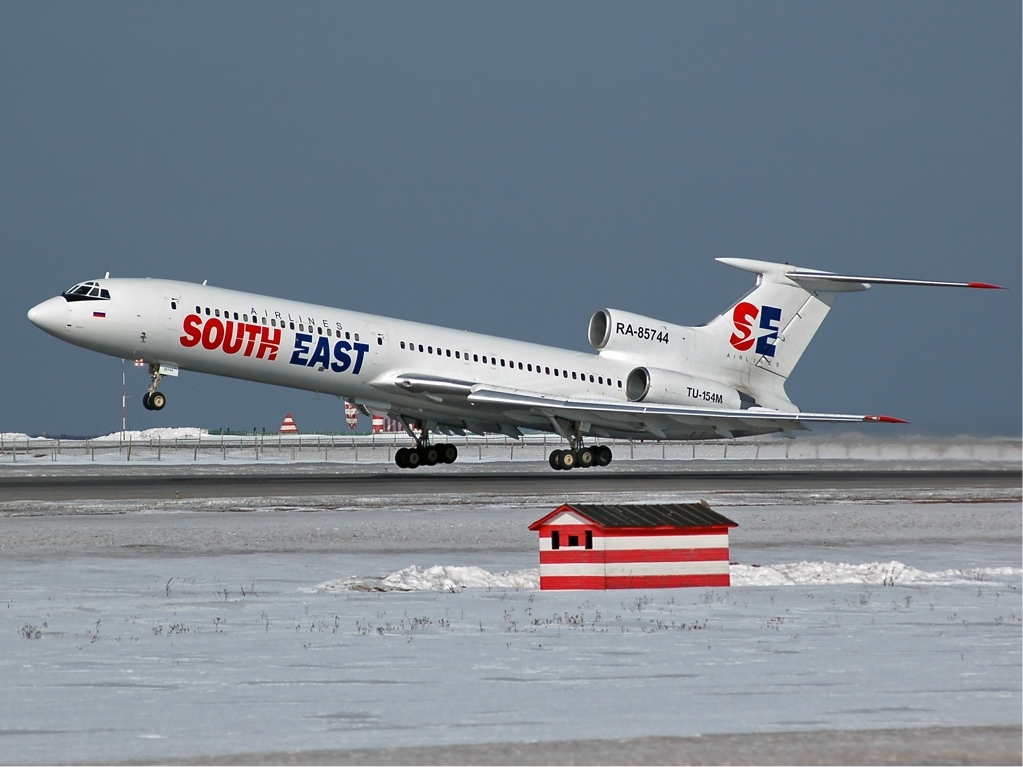
Aircraft in the new livery

As of December 2010, Dagestan Airlines operated scheduled flights to the following destinations:

- Russia
  - Makhachkala – Uytash Airport base
  - Moscow
    - Domodedovo International Airport
    - Vnukovo International Airport
  - Saint Petersburg – Pulkovo Airport
- Turkey
  - Istanbul – Sabiha Gökçen International Airport
- United Arab Emirates
  - Sharjah – Sharjah International Airport

== Fleet ==
The South East Airlines fleet consisted of the following aircraft (as of December 2011):

Dagestan Airlines Fleet
Aircraft	In Fleet
Antonov An-24RV	1
Tupolev Tu-134	2
Tupolev Tu-154B2	1
Tupolev Tu-154M	3
Mil Mi-8
Total	7

== Accidents and incidents ==
On 4 December 2010, Dagestan Airlines Flight 372, a Tupolev Tu-154M carrying 160 passengers and 8 crew, crashed during an emergency landing at Domodedovo International Airport, Moscow. Two passengers died and 56 were injured.
