= Severstal Avia =

Russian airline

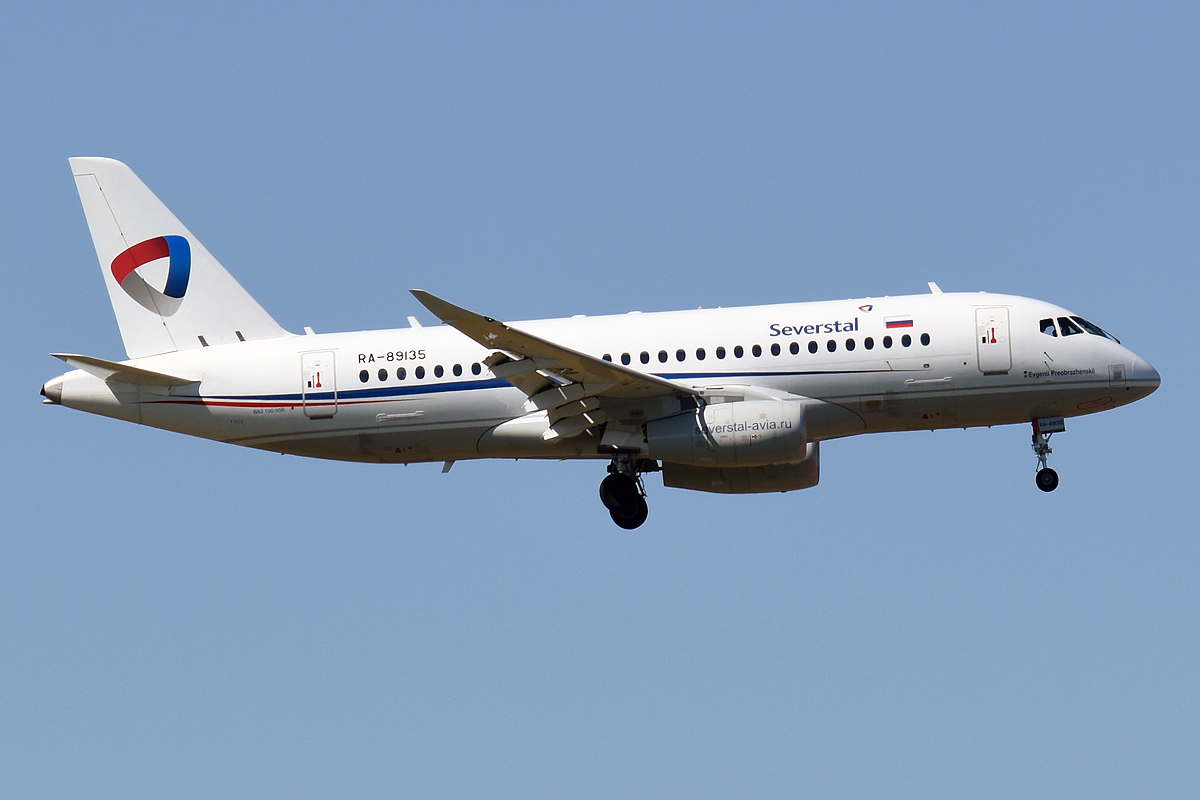
- Severstal Avia Sukhoi Superjet 100
IATA	ICAO	Call sign
D2	SSF	SEVERSTAL
- Fleet size: 8
- Parent company: Severstal
- Headquarters: Cherepovets Airport; Cherepovetsky District, Russia
- Website: severstal-avia.ru

Severstal Avia (Северсталь) is a Russian airline. Its head office is located on the property of Cherepovets Airport in Botovo village, Cherepovetsky District, Russia. It is currently banned from flying in the EU.

== Destinations ==
As of May 2024, Severstal Avia operates services to the following scheduled destinations:

Belarus

- Minsk - Minsk National Airport

Russia

- Dagestan
  - Makhachkala - Uytash Airport
- Ingushetia
  - Magas - Magas Airport Seasonal
- Komi
  - Ukhta - Ukhta Airport
- Kaliningrad Oblast
  - Kaliningrad - Khrabrovo Airport
- Kaluga Oblast
  - Kaluga - Grabtsevo Airport
- Karelia
  - Petrozavodsk - Besovets Airport Focus city
- Khanty-Mansi Autonomous Okrug
  - Sovetsky - Sovetsky Airport
- Krasnodar Krai
  - Sochi - Adler-Sochi International Airport Seasonal
- Moscow
  - Moscow Domodedovo Airport
  - Sheremetyevo International Airport
- Murmansk Oblast
  - Apatity - Khibiny Airport
  - Murmansk - Emperor Nicholas II Murmansk Airport
- Saint Petersburg
  - Pulkovo Airport
- Stavropol Krai
  - Mineralnye Vody - Mineralnye Vody Airport
- Sverdlovsk Oblast
  - Yekaterinburg - Koltsovo Airport
- Ulyanovsk Oblast
  - Ulyanovsk - Ulyanovsk Baratayevka Airport
- Vologda Oblast
  - Cherepovets - Cherepovets Airport Hub
  - Veliky Ustyug - Veliky Ustyug Airport

Turkey

- Istanbul - Istanbul Airport

=== Former destinations ===
Following the 2022 Russian invasion of Ukraine, several countries closed their airspace to Russian aeroplanes, particularly in Western Europe; Severstal had to suspend several services. As of July 2022, there is no indication of their resumption.

Finland

- Helsinki - Helsinki Airport

France

- Paris - Orly Airport

Georgia

- Batumi - Batumi International Airport Seasonal

Germany

- Berlin - Berlin Brandenburg Airport

Russia

- Anapa - Vityazevo Airport
- Gelendzhik - Gelendzhik Airport

Turkey

- Antalya - Antalya Airport

== Fleet ==
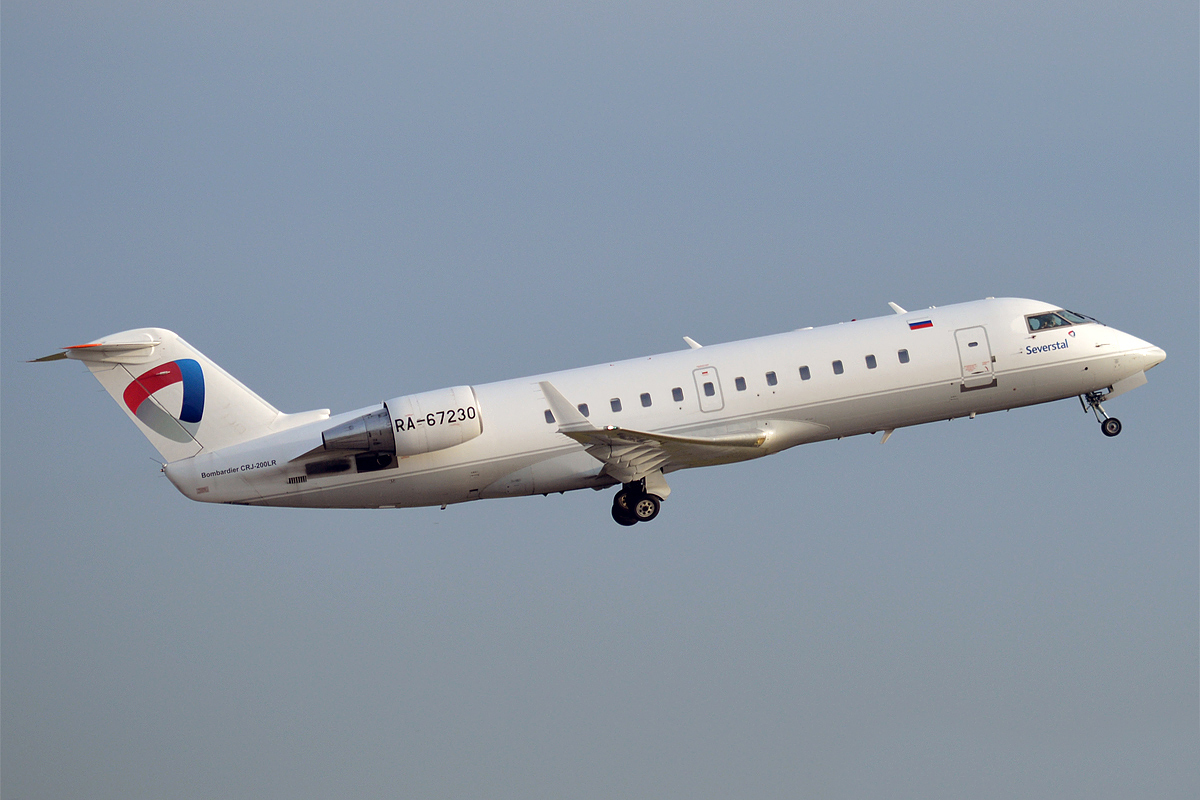
Severstal Air Company Bombardier CRJ200LR

As of August 2025, Severstal Avia operates the following aircraft:

Severstal Air Company fleet
Aircraft	In service	Orders	Passengers	Notes
Bombardier CRJ200LR	4	—	50	
Sukhoi Superjet 100-95B	4	2	93/100	Deliveries began in 2018
Total	8	2		
