= Resurrection Monastery (Cherepovets) =

Monastery in Cherepovets, Russia

Coordinates: 59.1186°N 37.9269°E

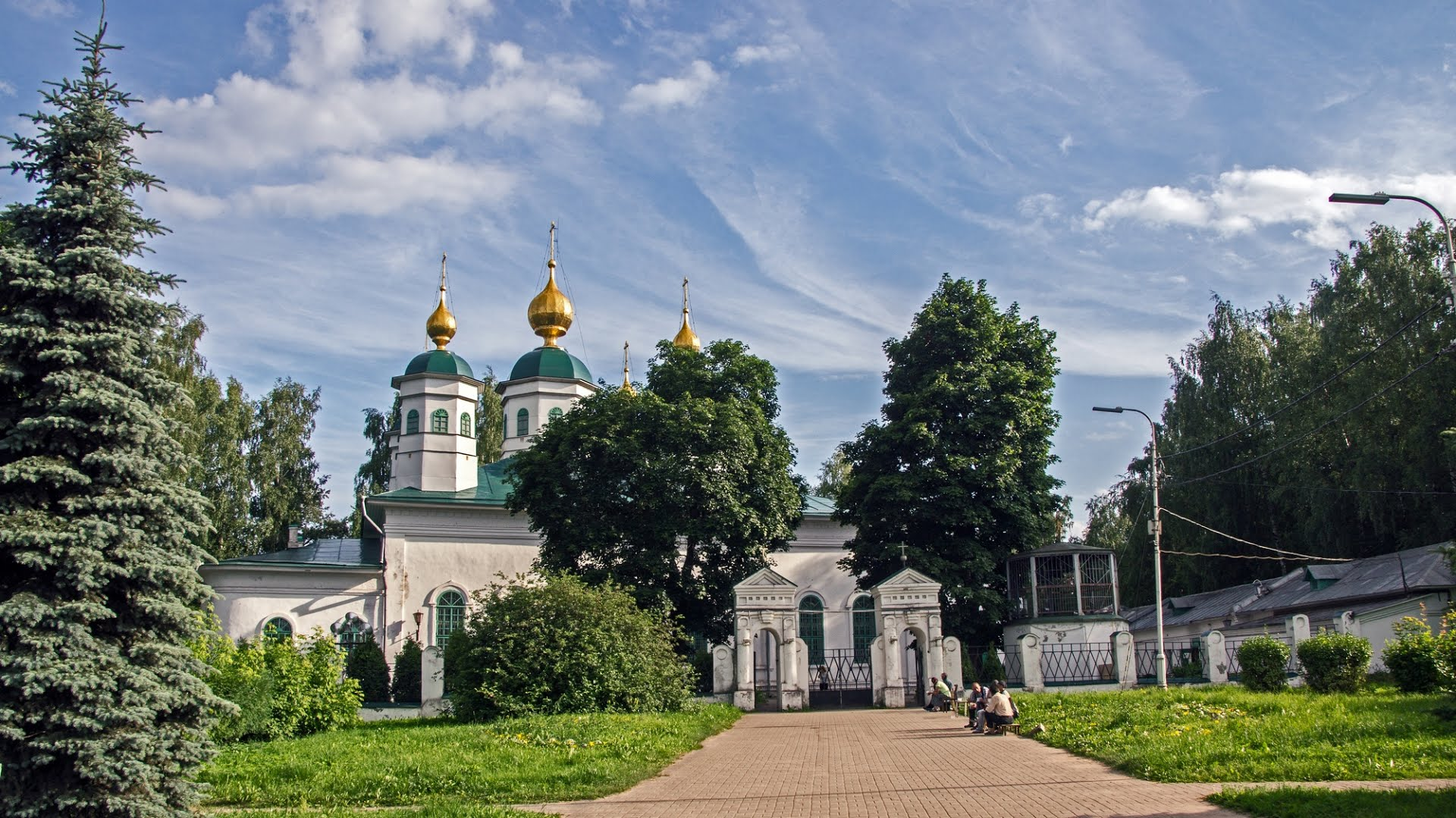
The katholikon

The Cherepovets Resurrection Monastery (Russian: Череповецкий Воскресенский Монастырь) was founded in the late 14th century by two Christian Orthodox monks Feodosy and Afanasy, followers of Sergius of Radonezh. The future place for the monastery was wisely selected on the hill near the junction of the Sheksna River and the Yagorba River, abundant with sturgeon and other freshwater fish.

The monastery laid the foundation for the future city of Cherepovets with city status granted in the year 1777 by Catherine the Great.

The Church of Resurrection had been completed between 1752 and 1756. Today, this is the oldest building in the whole city of Cherepovets. The church has five domes and was painted with frescoes in the year 1851.

The monastery was abolished in 1764. After the Russian Revolution, in 1920–1930, the church belonged to the Christian Russian Church (Обновленцы), with Ioann Maltsev as an Archpriest. During World War II, the church was used as a warehouse and aircraft engine repair shop. The church returned to its normal services in 1946 after the war was over.

== Literature ==
- История, М. Ю. Хрусталев, Воскресенский Череповецкий Монастырь, "По архивным и иконографическим источникам XVIII—XX веков" (http://www.booksite.ru/fulltext/2ch/ere/pov/ets/3.htm)
