= 2009 Uytash Airport collision =

2009 aviation accident

2009 Makhachkala Il-76 collision
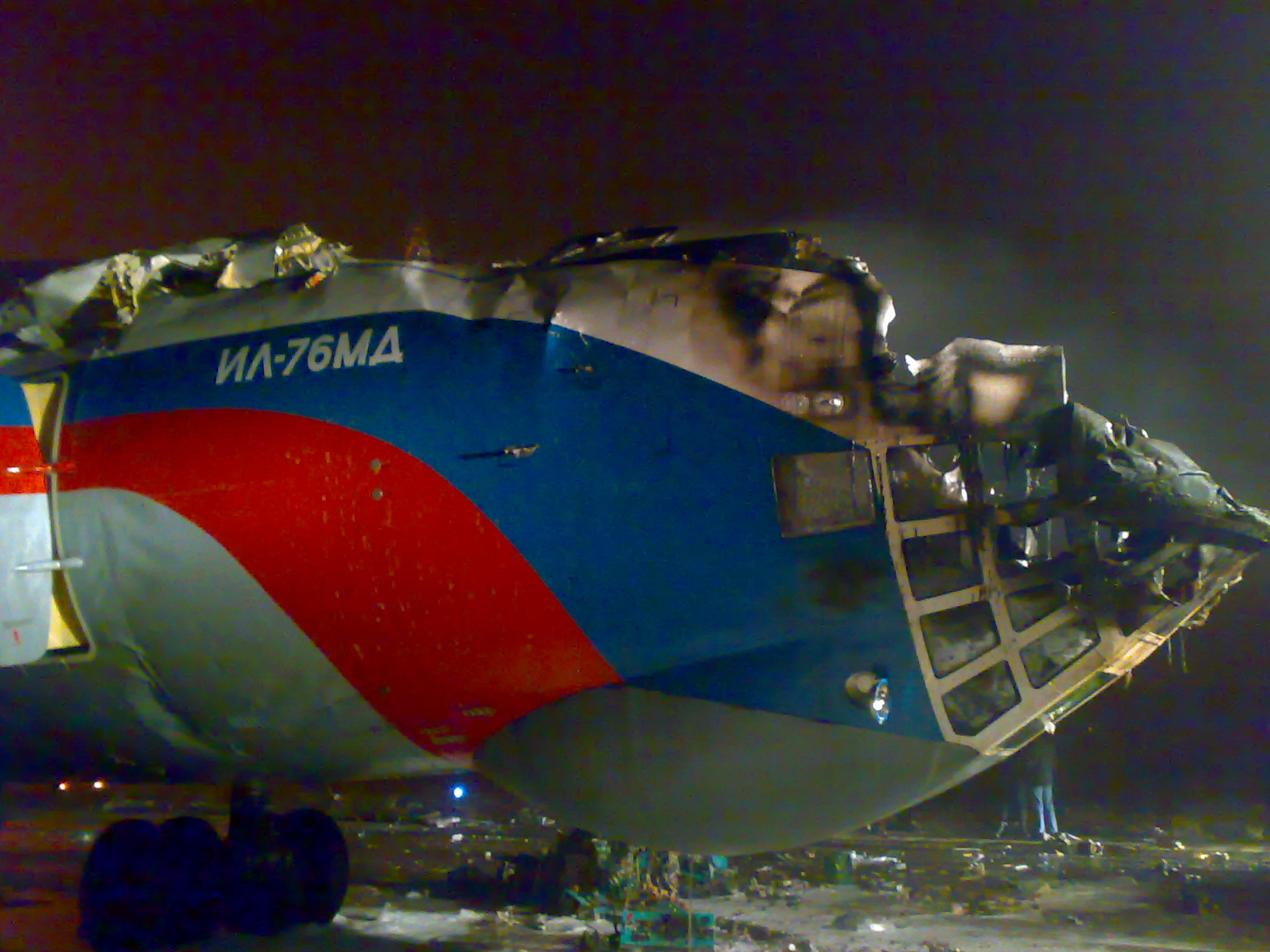
- The remains of RA-76825, a few hours after the collision.

Accident
- Date: 15 January 2009
- Summary: Ground collision due to Pilot error on RA-76827
- Site: Uytash Airport, Makhachkala, Republic of Dagestan, Russia; 42°49′01″N 47°39′08″E
- Total fatalities: 4
- Total survivors: 34 (all on board RA-76827 and 3 on board RA-76825)

First aircraft
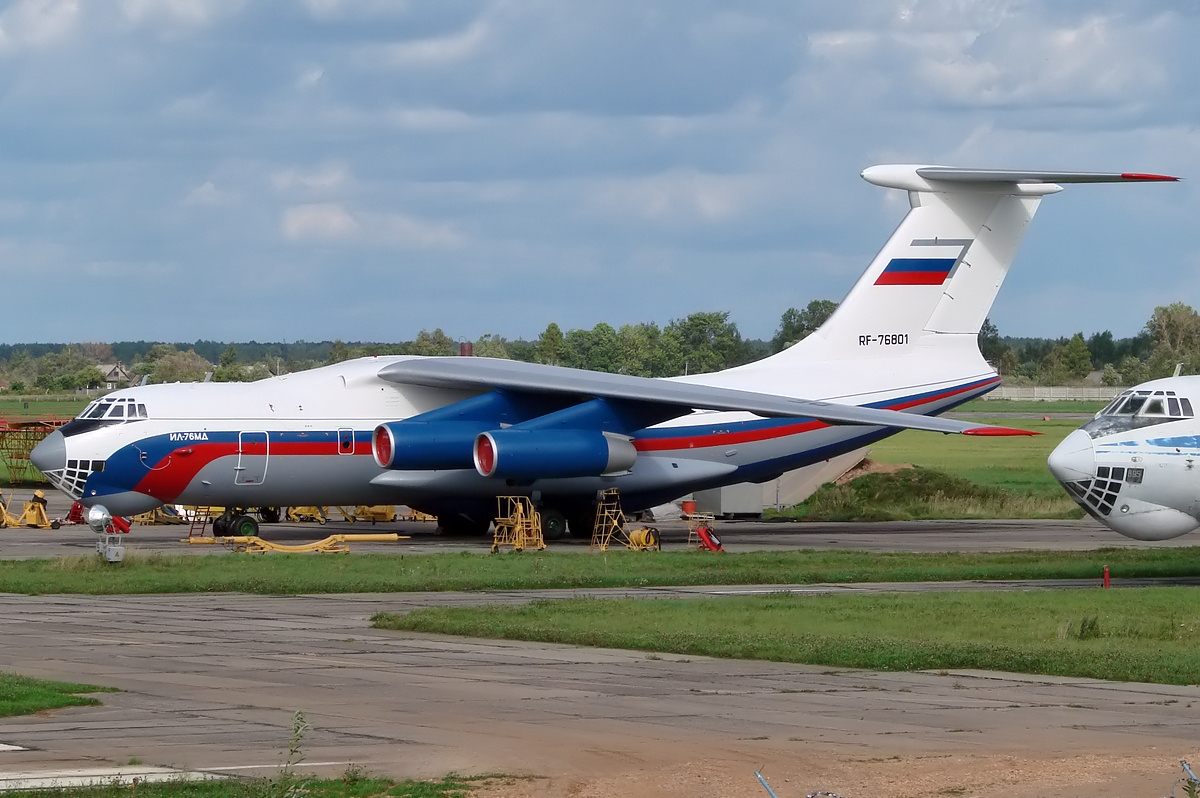
- Ilyushin Il-76 operated by the Russian Ministry, similar to the one involved.
- Type: Ilyushin Il-76MD
- Operator: Russian Ministry of Internal Affairs
- Registration: RA-76825
- Destination: Uytash Airport
- Occupants: 7
- Crew: 7
- Fatalities: 4
- Injuries: 2
- Survivors: 3

Second aircraft
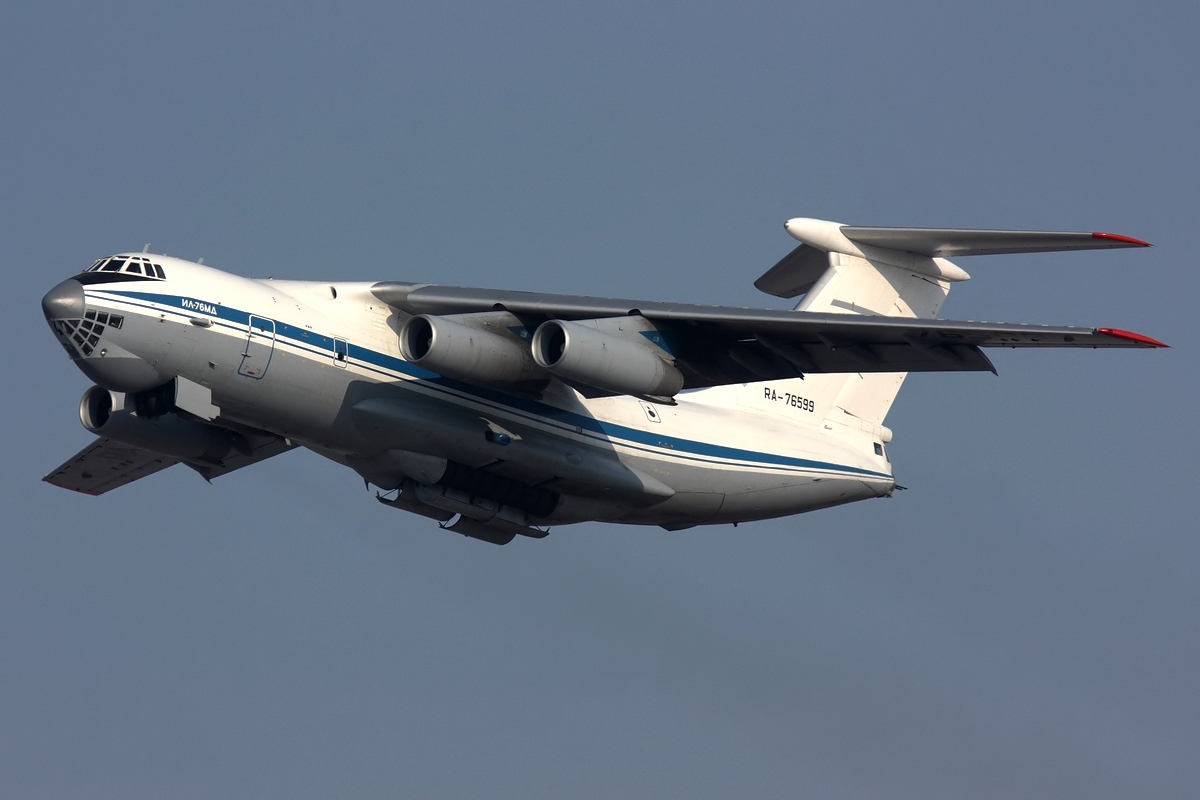
- Another Il-76 by the same operator, in another livery, and similar to the one involved in the collision.
- Type: Ilyushin Il-76MD
- Operator: Russian Ministry of Internal Affairs
- Registration: RA-76827
- Occupants: 31
- Fatalities: 0
- Survivors: 31

The 2009 Makhachkala Il-76 collision occurred on 15 January 2009 near 18:00 UTC, when two Ilyushin Il-76 transport aircraft of the Russian Ministry of Internal Affairs (MVD) collided at Uytash Airport serving the city of Makhachkala in Dagestan, Russia.

== Accident ==
On the evening of January 15, 2009, four Il-76 military transport aircraft of the 675th Special Aviation Regiment of the Russian Ministry of Internal Affairs took off from Chkalovsky air base with military personnel and equipment on board, bound for Makhachkala Airport. Their task was to unload the personnel and military equipment and return to their home Nizhny Novgorod Airport.

The first aircraft completed the task successfully. The second aircraft (tail number RA-76825) landed at the airport, unloaded and taxied to a runway access point, where it awaited the landing of the third aircraft (tail number RA-76827). The third aircraft, after landing in difficult weather conditions with the minimum established weather (fog, runway visibility 800 meters, vertical visibility 60 meters), touched down, moving however 15–20 meters to the left of the runway. Before that, the Il-76 still on the ground crossed the taxiway end line but did not report its position to Air traffic control (ATC). As a result, the landing aircraft hit the aircraft waiting for take-off with its wing in the cockpit.

As a result of the collision, the cockpit of the Il-76MD (RA-76825) on the ground was destroyed, of the seven crew members of the aircraft, four were killed.(Commander/Lieutenant Colonel Maxim Dubankov, Flight Engineer Vladimir Knyazevič, Flight Radio Operator Alexander Alekhine, Flight Engineer Anatoly Tupitsyn) and two were injured and were later taken to a hospital in the city of Kaspiysk. One crew member who had been located in a different part of the aircraft didn’t sustain severe injury. None of the 6 crew members and 25 passengers on board the landing aircraft were injured. The pilot of the fourth Il-76, after assessing the situation, directed the aircraft to an alternative airport.

== Aftermath ==
Makhachkala Airport was closed until the runway and damaged areas were cleaned. Material damage from the damage to two aircraft amounted to 158.7 million rubles.

After the collision, aircraft RA-76827 was repaired at the 123rd Aircraft Repair Plant (Staraya Russa) and returned to service on 15 December 2010.
