= Vologda Aviation Enterprise =

Russian airline

Vologda Air Company
IATA	ICAO	Call sign
—	VGV	VOLOGDA AIR
- Founded: 1931
- Hubs: Vologda
- Fleet size: 26
- Destinations: 6
- Headquarters: Vologda
- Website: Official website

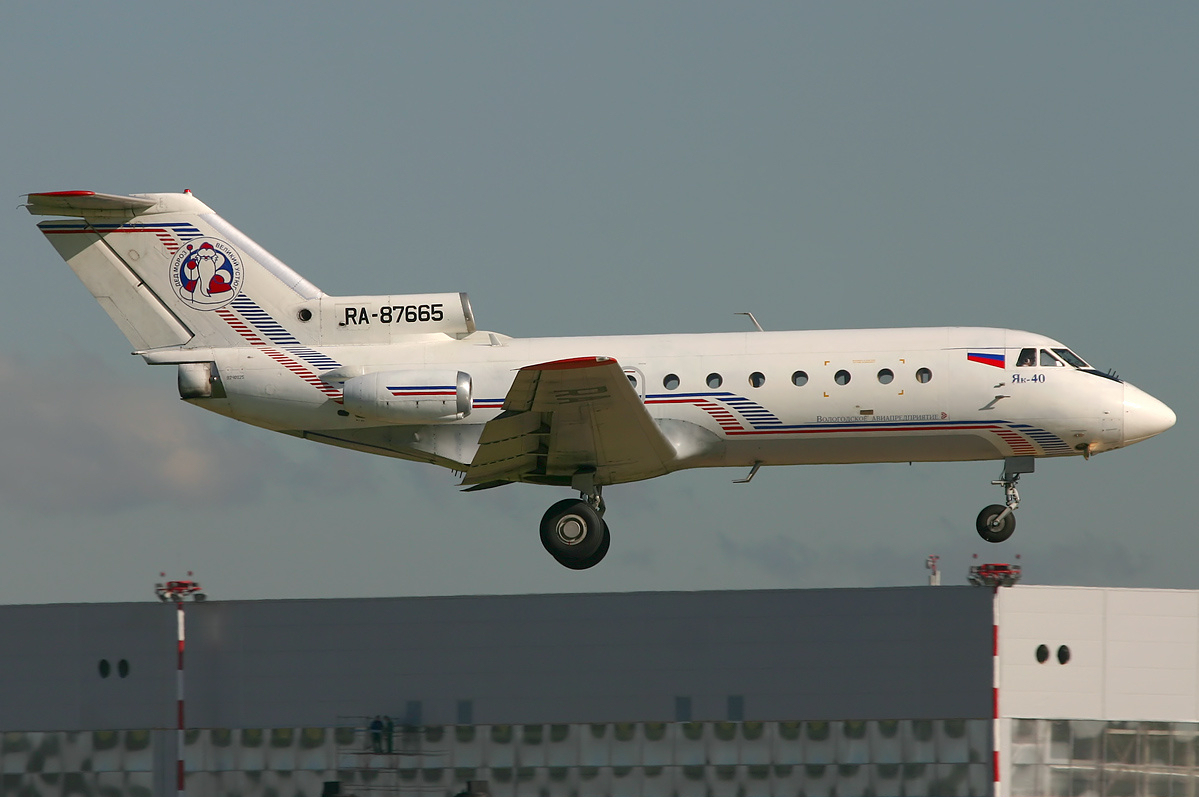
Yakovlev Yak-40

Joint-Stock Company "Vologda Aviation Enterprise", doing business as Vologda Air Company (VAC, Вологодское авиапредприятие, Vologodskoje aviapredprijatije), is an airline with its head office on the property of Vologda Airport in Vologda, Russia. It operates scheduled domestic and regional passenger services. It was formerly the Aeroflot Vologda division, United Air Detachment of Northern Territorial Board of Civil Aviation (1952–1963), Vologda United Air Detachment (1963–1991) and Vologda Air Company (1991–present).

The airline also has branches located on the properties of the airports serving Belozersk, Kichmengsky Gorodok, Nikolsk, Nyuksenitsa, Totma, Veliky Ustyug, and Vytegra. These branches are not legal divisions of the company.

At any one time they have an average of 1500 staff working there.

It is currently banned from flying into the European Union.

== History ==
On 1 September 1931 there was the first flight through the new air-strip at Vologda – Moscow-Yaroslavl-Vologda-Archangelsk.

To make best use of their new manmade landing strips, they received their Yak-40 aircraft in 1969 which spurred development. In 1978 they moved to a new airfield.

== Services ==
The airline carries out scheduled and charter passenger and emergency services, aerial thermal imaging and photography, search-and-rescue and aerial patrol flights

== Destinations ==
The airline operates scheduled flights to following destinations:

Moscow / Moscow Oblast

- Vnukovo International Airport

Leningrad Oblast / Saint Petersburg

- Pulkovo Airport

Vologda Oblast

- Veliky Ustyug – Veliky Ustyug Airport
- Vologda – Vologda Airport Base

=== Past Destinations ===
Arkhangelsk Oblast

- Arkhangelsk – Talagi Airport
- Kotlas – Kotlas Airport

Belgorod Oblast

- Stary Oskol – Stary Oskol Airport

== Fleet ==
As of February 2025 Vologda Air Enterprise operates following fleet:

Vologda Air Enterprise fleet
Aircraft	In service	Orders	Passengers	Notes
Antonov An-2	3	—		
Yakovlev Yak-40	5	—		
Mil Mi-8T	13	—		
Mil Mi-8AMT	4	—		
Mil Mi-8MTV-1	1	—		
