= Ulyanovsk Baratayevka Airport =

International airport in Ulyanovsk, Russia

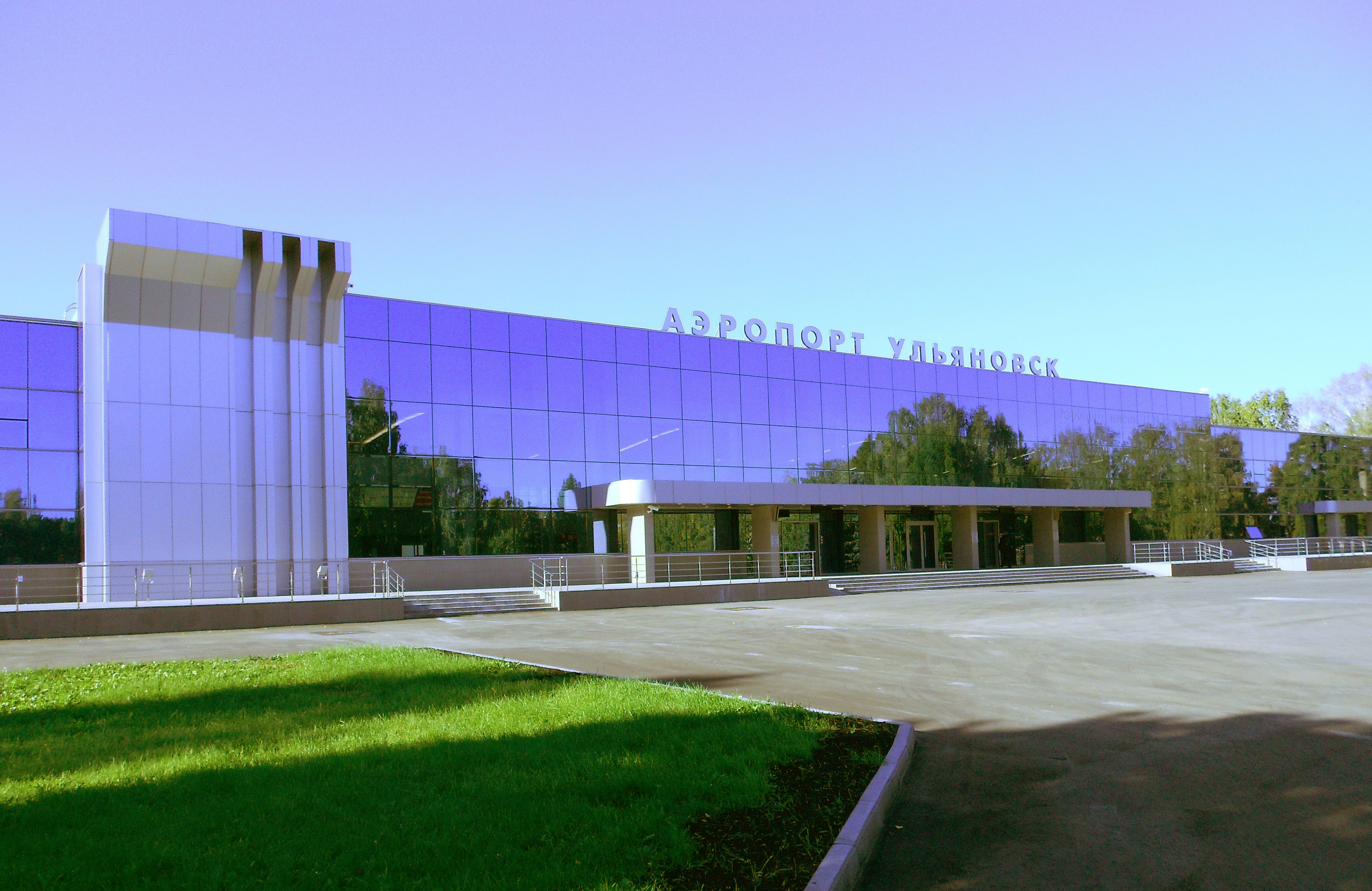
- IATA: ULV; ICAO: UWLL

Summary
- Airport type: Public
- Serves: Ulyanovsk, Ulyanovsk Oblast, Russia
- Elevation AMSL: 141 m (463 ft)
- Coordinates: 54°16′32″N 48°14′35″E
- Website: ulkaero.ru

Maps
- Ulyanovsk Oblast in Russia

- Location of the airport in the Ulyanovsk Oblast

Runways
Direction	Length		Surface
Direction	m	ft	Surface
03/21	3,820	12,533	Concrete
- Sources: GCM, STV

Ulyanovsk Baratayevka Airport (also Ulyanovsk Southwest Airport and Ul'yanovsk Airport) (IATA: ULV, ICAO: UWLL) is an airport in Russia located 9 kilometres (5.6 mi) southwest of Ulyanovsk. It generally operates as a civilian/transport base.

During April 2013, a terminal remodel was completed to accommodate a steady increase in passenger traffic to the area, resulting from increased corporate investment in the Ulyanovsk area.

Ulyanovsk Aircraft Museum is located near the airport, exposition includes the Tupolev Tu-144 supersonic aircraft (reg. no. SSSR-77110).

== Airlines and destinations ==
Airlines	Destinations
Aeroflot	Moscow–Sheremetyevo
azimuth	Minrelanye Vody
Nordwind Airlines	Sochi
Pobeda	Moscow–Vnukovo, Saint Petersburg, Sochi
Red Wings Airlines	Minsk, Yekaterinburg
Rossiya Airlines	Moscow–Sheremetyevo
S7 Airlines	Novosibirsk
Severstal Avia	Seasonal: Cherepovets, Makhachkala

== See also ==
- Ulyanovsk Vostochny Airport
- Samara Kurumoch Airport
