= Botovo, Russia =

Botovo (Russian: Ботово) is the name of several rural localities in Russia:

- Botovo, Chernogolovka, Moscow Oblast, a village under the administrative jurisdiction of Chernogolovka Town Under Oblast Jurisdiction, Moscow Oblast
- Botovo, Sergiyevo-Posadsky District, Moscow Oblast, a village in Bereznyakovskoye Rural Settlement of Sergiyevo-Posadsky District of Moscow Oblast
- Botovo, Volokolamsky District, Moscow Oblast, a village in Kashinskoye Rural Settlement of Volokolamsky District of Moscow Oblast
- Botovo, Perm Krai, a village in Kungursky District of Perm Krai
- Botovo, Tver Oblast, a village in Ostashkovsky District of Tver Oblast
- Botovo, Cherepovetsky District, Vologda Oblast, a village in Yargomzhsky Selsoviet of Cherepovetsky District of Vologda Oblast
- Botovo, Kirillovsky District, Vologda Oblast, a village in Charozersky Selsoviet of Kirillovsky District of Vologda Oblast
- Botovo, Yaroslavl Oblast, a village in Pestretsovsky Rural Okrug of Yaroslavsky District of Yaroslavl Oblast
