= Cherepovets Airport =

Airport in Russia

Cherepovets
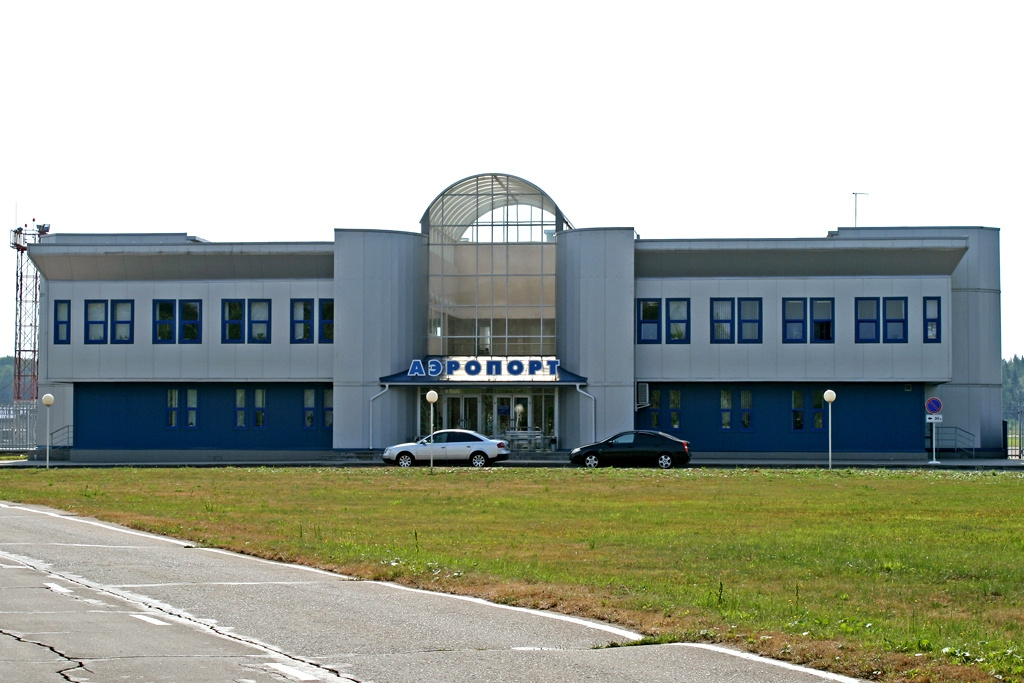
- IATA: CEE; ICAO: ULWC

Summary
- Airport type: Public
- Serves: Cherepovets
- Location: Botovo
- Opened: 1933
- Hub for: Severstal Air Company
- Elevation AMSL: 377 ft / 115 m
- Coordinates: 59°16′42″N 38°1′21″E
- Website: severstal-avia.ru

Map
- Location of airport in Vologda Oblast

Runways
Direction	Length		Surface
Direction	ft	m	Surface
03/21	8,277	2,523	Asphalt

Cherepovets Airport (IATA: CEE, ICAO: ULWC) is an international airport in Botovo village, Cherepovetsky District, Vologda Oblast, Russia, located 18 kilometres (11 mi) north of Cherepovets.

The airport has the head office of Severstal Air Company.

== Airlines and destinations ==
Airlines	Destinations
Severstal Avia	Arkhangelsk-Talagi, Kaliningrad, Kazan, Mineralnye Vody, Minsk, Moscow–Domodedovo, Moscow–Sheremetyevo, Murmansk, Saint Petersburg, Sochi, Velikiy Ustyug, Yekaterinburg; Seasonal: Solovki, Ulyanovsk–Baratayevka

== See also ==
- List of airports in Russia
