= Cherepovets =

City in Vologda Oblast, Russia

Cherepovets Череповец
- City
- Cathedral of Resurrection of Jesus Christ Church of Nativity of Jesus Christ Museum of local history Building in the historical center of the city

- Flag Coat of arms
- Interactive map of Cherepovets
- Location of Cherepovets Cherepovets (Europe) Cherepovets (Russia)
- Coordinates: 59°07′N 37°54′E
- Country: Russia
- Federal subject: Vologda Oblast
- Founded: November 4, 1777
- City status since: 1777

Government
  - Body: City Duma
  - Mayor: Vadim Germanov

Area
  - Total: 120.9 km^{2} (46.7 sq mi)
- Elevation: 130 m (430 ft)

Population (2010 Census)
  - Total: 312,310
  - Estimate (2025): 298,160 (−4.5%)
  - Rank: 59th in 2010
  - Density: 2,583/km^{2} (6,690/sq mi)

Administrative status
  - Subordinated to: city of oblast significance of Cherepovets
  - Capital of: Cherepovetsky District, city of oblast significance of Cherepovets

Municipal status
  - Urban okrug: Cherepovets Urban Okrug
- Time zone: UTC+3 (MSK)
- Postal code: 162600
- Dialing code: +7 8202
- OKTMO ID: 19730000001
- Website: www.cherinfo.ru

Historical population
| Year | Pop. | ±% |
|---|---|---|
| 1897 | 7,000 | — |
| 1926 | 22,000 | +214.3% |
| 1939 | 32,000 | +45.5% |
| 1959 | 92,356 | +188.6% |
| 1970 | 188,348 | +103.9% |
| 1979 | 265,933 | +41.2% |
| 1989 | 310,463 | +16.7% |
| 2002 | 311,869 | +0.5% |
| 2010 | 309,298 | −0.8% |
| 2021 | 305,185 | −1.3% |
Source: Census data

Cherepovets (Russian: Череповец, IPA: [tɕɪrʲɪpɐˈvʲets]) is a city in Vologda Oblast, Russia, located in the west of the oblast on the banks of the Sheksna River (a tributary of the Volga River) and on the shores of the Rybinsk Reservoir. As of the 2010 Census, its population was 312,310, making it the most populous city in the oblast.

== Etymology ==
The origin of the word "Cherepovets" is a subject of much debate among the local historians. According to one version, the city supposedly received its name from the word "skull" (Russian: череп, cherep). In antiquity, a pagan sanctuary was there in honor of the god Veles on the hill at the confluence of the Sheksna and Yagorba Rivers. The top of the hill was called the "skull." Another version suggests that the word "Cherepovets" originates from the name of the tribe "Ves" (весь), who inhabited the Sheksna's banks. According to this version, "Cherepovets" in the language of local indigenous Veps means "Veps' fish hill."

== History ==
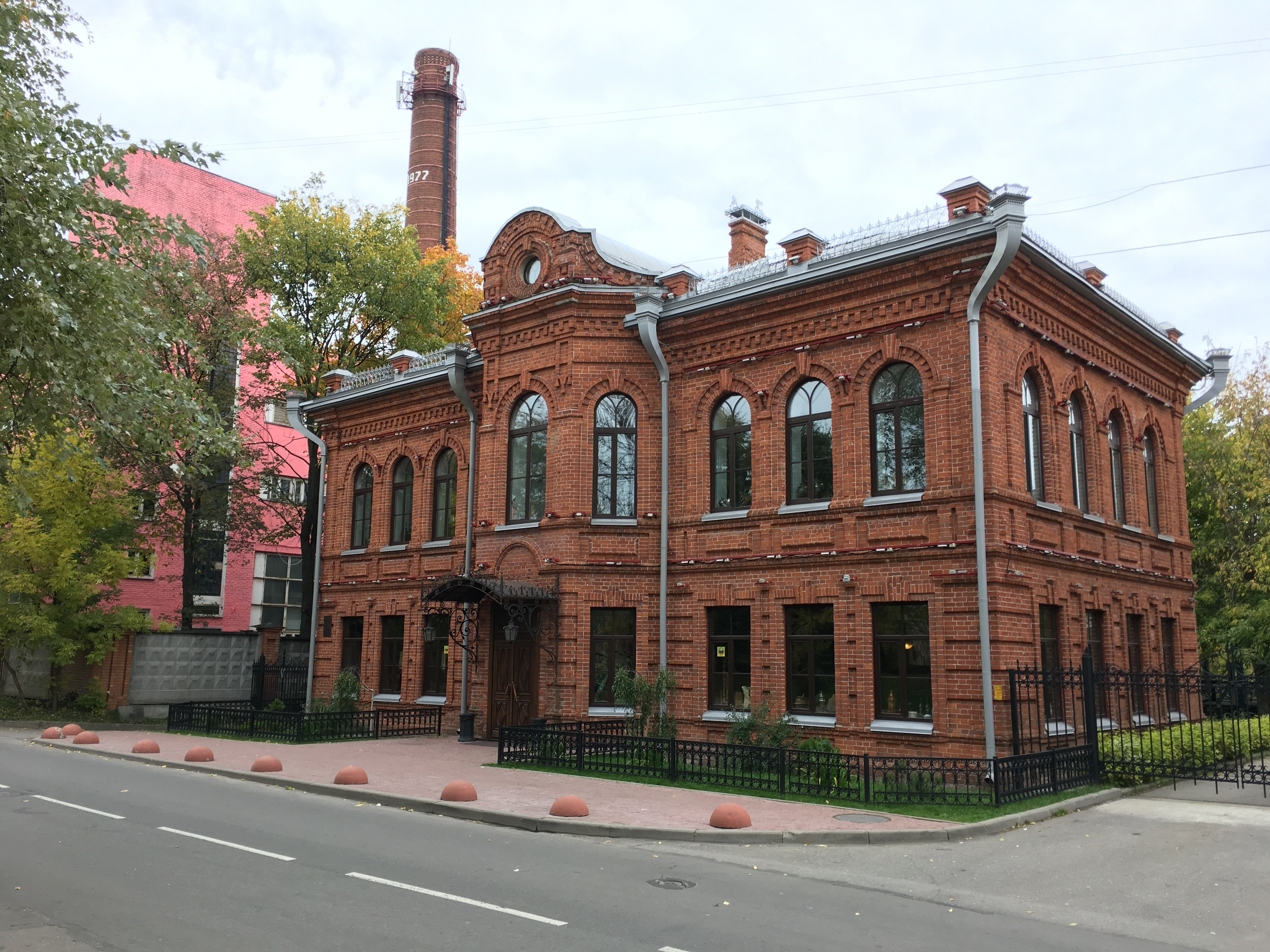
Cherepovets real school building (1902)

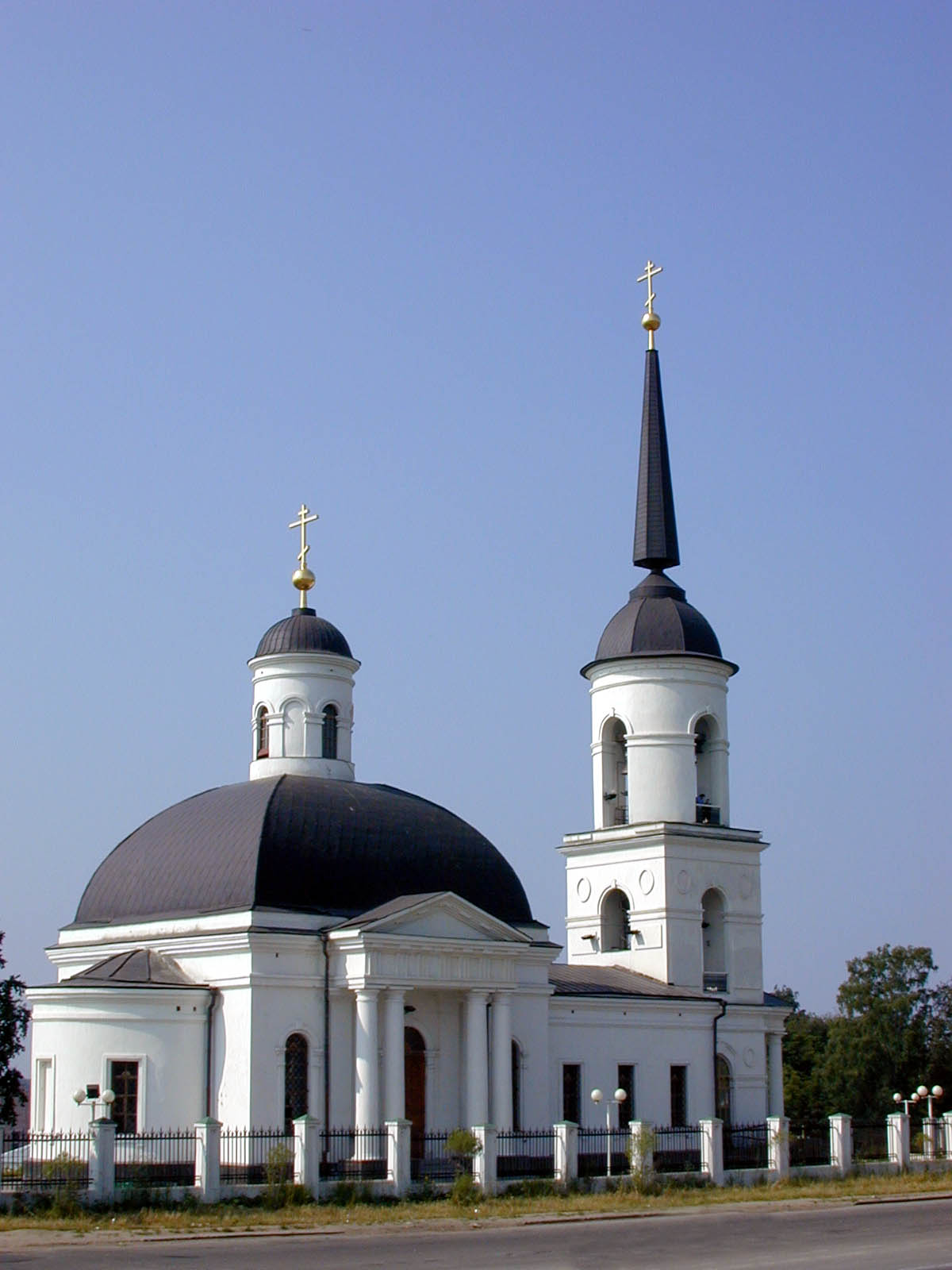
Restored Church of the Nativity (1789)

The foundation of Cherepovets is traditionally ascribed to two orthodox monks Feodosy and Afanasy. In 1362, they founded the Cherepovets Resurrection Monastery, in the vicinity of which a small village of Fedosyevo was founded. Historians consider the former village of Fedosyevo to be in the center of modern Cherepovets. Several centuries were needed to develop the small village into a prominent trade, manufacturing, and regional transportation center. Cherepovets was granted city status in 1777 by Catherine the Great and became the center of a separate uyezd in the administrative structure of the Novgorod Governorate.

The construction of the Mariinsk canal system in 1810 made a significant impact on the development of the city. The Mariinsk Canal System connected Cherepovets with the Volga River to the south and the Baltic Sea to the west. At that time, the city was still at a very early stage of development with a population of 3000 residents by 1863. For a long time, the city brickworks with seven workers was the sole industrial enterprise in Cherepovets.

The development of the city became more dynamic after Emancipation Reform happened in 1861 and the appearance of the shipbuilding industry. The city soon became a prominent shipbuilding and logistics center connecting major regional railways and waterways. The population had grown to 10,000 by 1915.

After the revolution, in March 1918, eastern uyezds of the Novgorod Governorate were renamed to separate Cherepovets Governorate centered around Cherepovets. The new governorate existed for less than 10 years. In 1927, it was merged with Leningrad, Novgorod, Pskov, and Murmansk Governorates into a single Leningrad Oblast. In September 1937, most of the former Cherepovets Governorate territories (except for Tikhvin district) were transferred to the newly established Vologda Oblast.

The subsequent development of the city is closely related to the completion of the construction of the Cherepovets steel mill (now known as Severstal) in 1955, the second-largest in the country. Unlike the majority of the most important metallurgy centers in the former Soviet Union, the location of the future steel plant was selected far away from the actual mineral resources and deposits. The reason for that was the logistic advantage of having a well-developed infrastructure that allowed connection of the north and northwest of the country by rail, road, and waterways into a single operation system. It connected such remote mining centers as Vorkuta and Olenegorsk, Murmansk Oblast.

The rapid growth of the industry center drastically changed the city, and by the early 1960s, its population exceeded 100,000 residents (three times bigger than the pre-World War II population). By 1970, Cherepovets had become the most populated city in Vologda Oblast.

== Geography ==
The city is located near the major Volga-Baltic waterway, west–east railroads, gas pipelines, and between two Russian federal cities, Moscow and St. Petersburg.

=== Climate ===
Cherepovets has a distinctive four-seasons humid continental climate (Dfb) (just above subarctic (Dfc)), with warm summers and cold but not extremely cold winters by Russian standards. It falls into the humid continental zone by the fourth warmest month being just above 10 °C (50 °F) in mean temperature and the annual temperature being 3.3 °C (37.9 °F), above the freezing point. Winter, however, lasts for five months, rendering transitional periods rather short.

Climate data for Cherepovets (1991–2020, extremes 1955–present)
| Month | Jan | Feb | Mar | Apr | May | Jun | Jul | Aug | Sep | Oct | Nov | Dec | Year |
|---|---|---|---|---|---|---|---|---|---|---|---|---|---|
| Record high °C (°F) | 5.4 (41.7) | 6.7 (44.1) | 16.0 (60.8) | 26.0 (78.8) | 32.2 (90.0) | 35.0 (95.0) | 35.7 (96.3) | 36.2 (97.2) | 28.2 (82.8) | 22.5 (72.5) | 12.8 (55.0) | 8.5 (47.3) | 36.2 (97.2) |
| Mean daily maximum °C (°F) | −6.0 (21.2) | −4.8 (23.4) | 1.2 (34.2) | 9.5 (49.1) | 17.4 (63.3) | 21.3 (70.3) | 23.7 (74.7) | 21.2 (70.2) | 15.2 (59.4) | 7.1 (44.8) | −0.3 (31.5) | −4.0 (24.8) | 8.5 (47.3) |
| Daily mean °C (°F) | −9.2 (15.4) | −8.7 (16.3) | −3.7 (25.3) | 3.6 (38.5) | 10.8 (51.4) | 15.1 (59.2) | 17.6 (63.7) | 15.1 (59.2) | 10.0 (50.0) | 3.8 (38.8) | −2.5 (27.5) | −6.6 (20.1) | 3.8 (38.8) |
| Mean daily minimum °C (°F) | −12.6 (9.3) | −12.5 (9.5) | −8.1 (17.4) | −1.6 (29.1) | 4.5 (40.1) | 8.9 (48.0) | 11.7 (53.1) | 9.6 (49.3) | 5.7 (42.3) | 1.0 (33.8) | −4.8 (23.4) | −9.5 (14.9) | −0.6 (30.9) |
| Record low °C (°F) | −45.4 (−49.7) | −40.3 (−40.5) | −32.8 (−27.0) | −23.0 (−9.4) | −6.1 (21.0) | −2.8 (27.0) | 0.7 (33.3) | −1.5 (29.3) | −9.5 (14.9) | −21.6 (−6.9) | −31.3 (−24.3) | −42.0 (−43.6) | −45.4 (−49.7) |
| Average precipitation mm (inches) | 44 (1.7) | 35 (1.4) | 35 (1.4) | 29 (1.1) | 49 (1.9) | 68 (2.7) | 75 (3.0) | 73 (2.9) | 54 (2.1) | 58 (2.3) | 51 (2.0) | 48 (1.9) | 619 (24.4) |
| Average extreme snow depth cm (inches) | 36 (14) | 47 (19) | 44 (17) | 10 (3.9) | 0 (0) | 0 (0) | 0 (0) | 0 (0) | 0 (0) | 1 (0.4) | 7 (2.8) | 21 (8.3) | 47 (19) |
| Average rainy days | 5 | 4 | 6 | 12 | 16 | 18 | 17 | 18 | 19 | 18 | 11 | 6 | 150 |
| Average snowy days | 27 | 24 | 18 | 8 | 2 | 0.2 | 0 | 0 | 1 | 8 | 21 | 27 | 136 |
| Average relative humidity (%) | 86 | 83 | 79 | 72 | 68 | 75 | 78 | 82 | 85 | 87 | 88 | 88 | 81 |
Source: Pogoda.ru.net

== Administrative and municipal status ==
Within the framework of administrative divisions, Cherepovets serves as the administrative center of Cherepovetsky District, although not being a part of it. As an administrative division, it is incorporated separately as the "city of oblast significance of Cherepovets" (one of the four in the oblast), an administrative unit with the status equal to that of the districts. As a municipal division, the city of oblast significance of Cherepovets is incorporated as Cherepovets Urban Okrug.

== Economy ==
Cherepovets is an important industrial center in northwestern Russia, mostly known as the country's largest steel manufacturing plant, with exports going to more than 50 countries around the world.

=== Metallurgy ===
The city began growing rapidly with the construction of steel mills in the late 1930s. The first blast furnace was put into operation in 1955. The first Cherepovets iron was produced in August 1955 and steel in May 1958. In February 1959, the first ingot was rolled in a blooming mill, and in November of the same year, the first hot-rolled plate was produced.

Nowadays, complex processes of iron and steel production are highly automated. The workshops have been modernized according to the latest advances in engineering and technology of metal production. The joint-stock company 'Severstal' (LSE, MOEX) is a global exporter of ferrous and nonferrous metals: iron, steel, hot-rolled plates, cold roll-formed shapes, and other products.

=== Chemical industry ===
The second largest industry in the city is the chemical industry. Its main production area is concentrated in mineral fertilizers. PhosAgro (LSE, MOEX) is the largest producer of phosphate-based fertilizers and phosphoric and sulfuric acids in Europe. It is also one of the leading producers of NPK fertilizers, ammonia, and ammonium nitrate in Russia.

As an outcome of the high volume of metallurgical and chemical production, Cherepovets is one of the most heavily polluted cities in the world. According to a 2011 assessment, the city ranked second only after Norilsk, Russia.

=== Transportation ===
Cherepovets is served by Cherepovets Airport, which is a hub for Severstal Air Company. Cherepovets has rail and road access to Vologda, the administrative center of the oblast, to Moscow, the capital of Russia, and to St. Petersburg. In addition, it is served by Cherepovets Trams which has been active since 1956. The location by the Sheksna River makes water transportation down the Volga–Baltic Waterway possible, with further access to the Baltic Sea. The first-ever cable-stayed bridge in Russia, Oktyabrsky Bridge was built in the city in 1979.

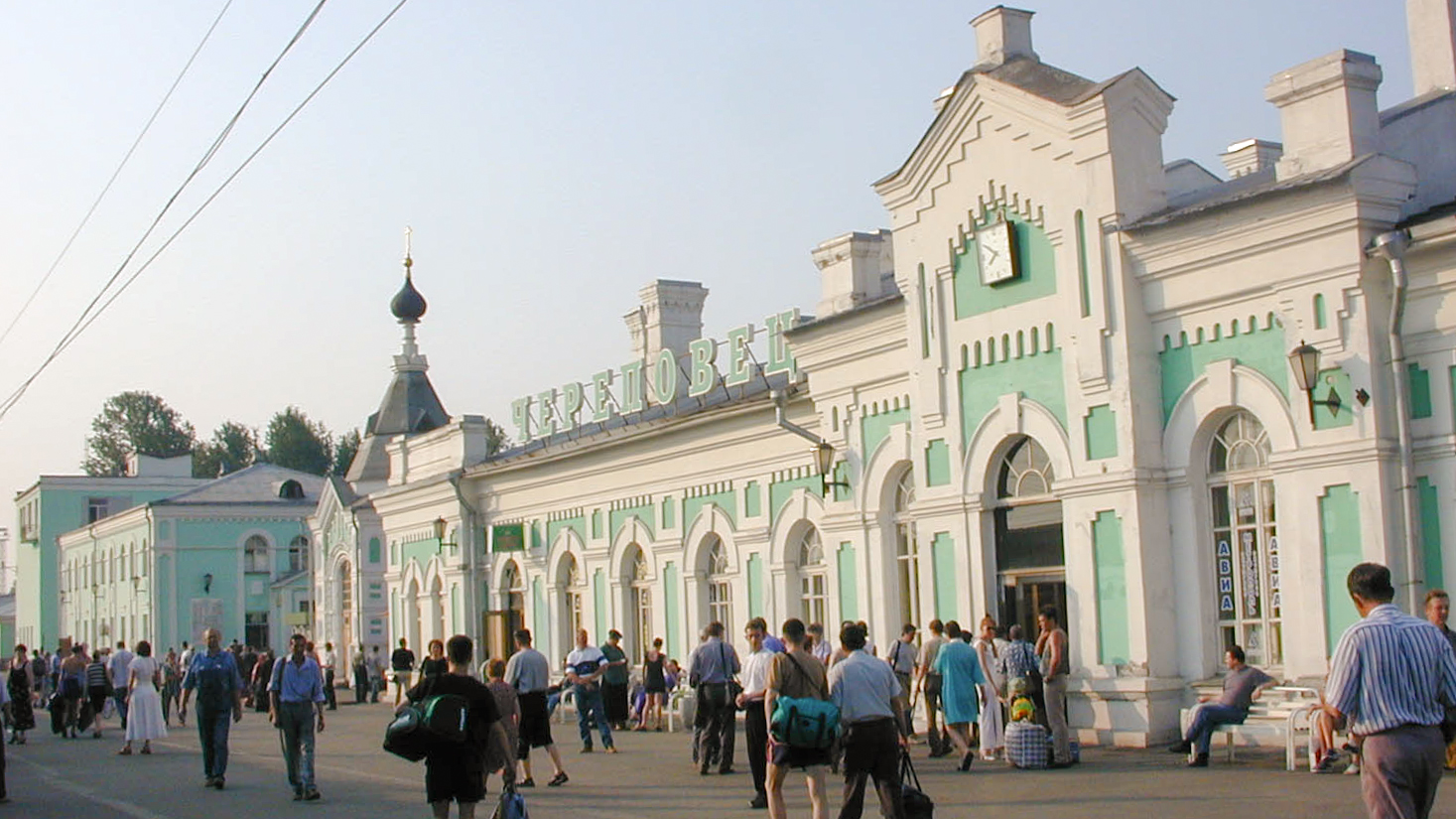
Cherepovets Railway Station

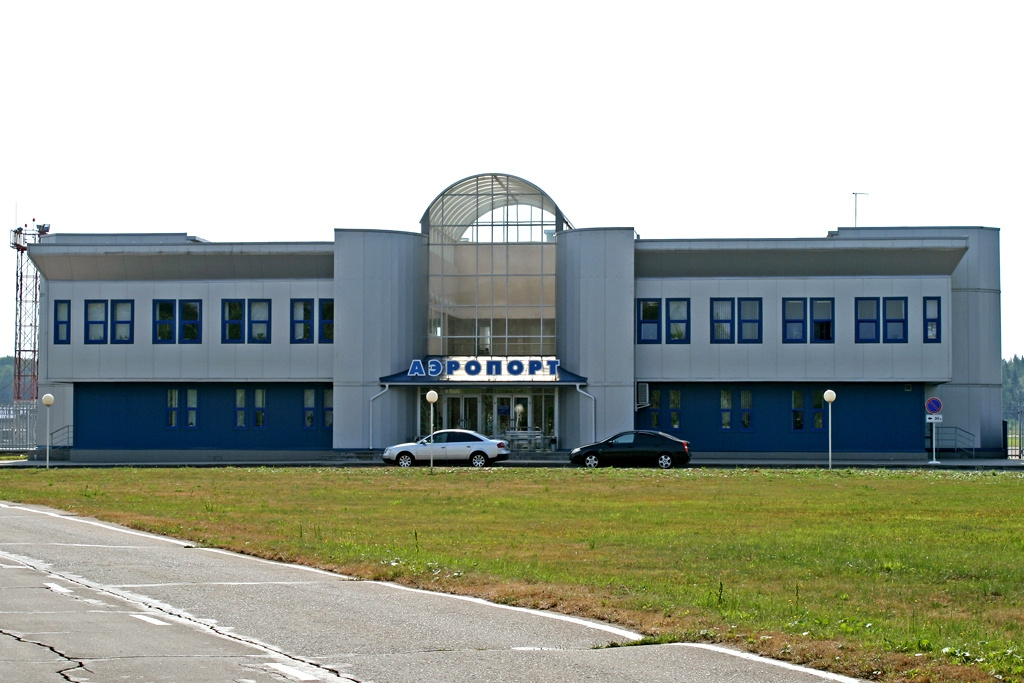
Cherepovets Airport

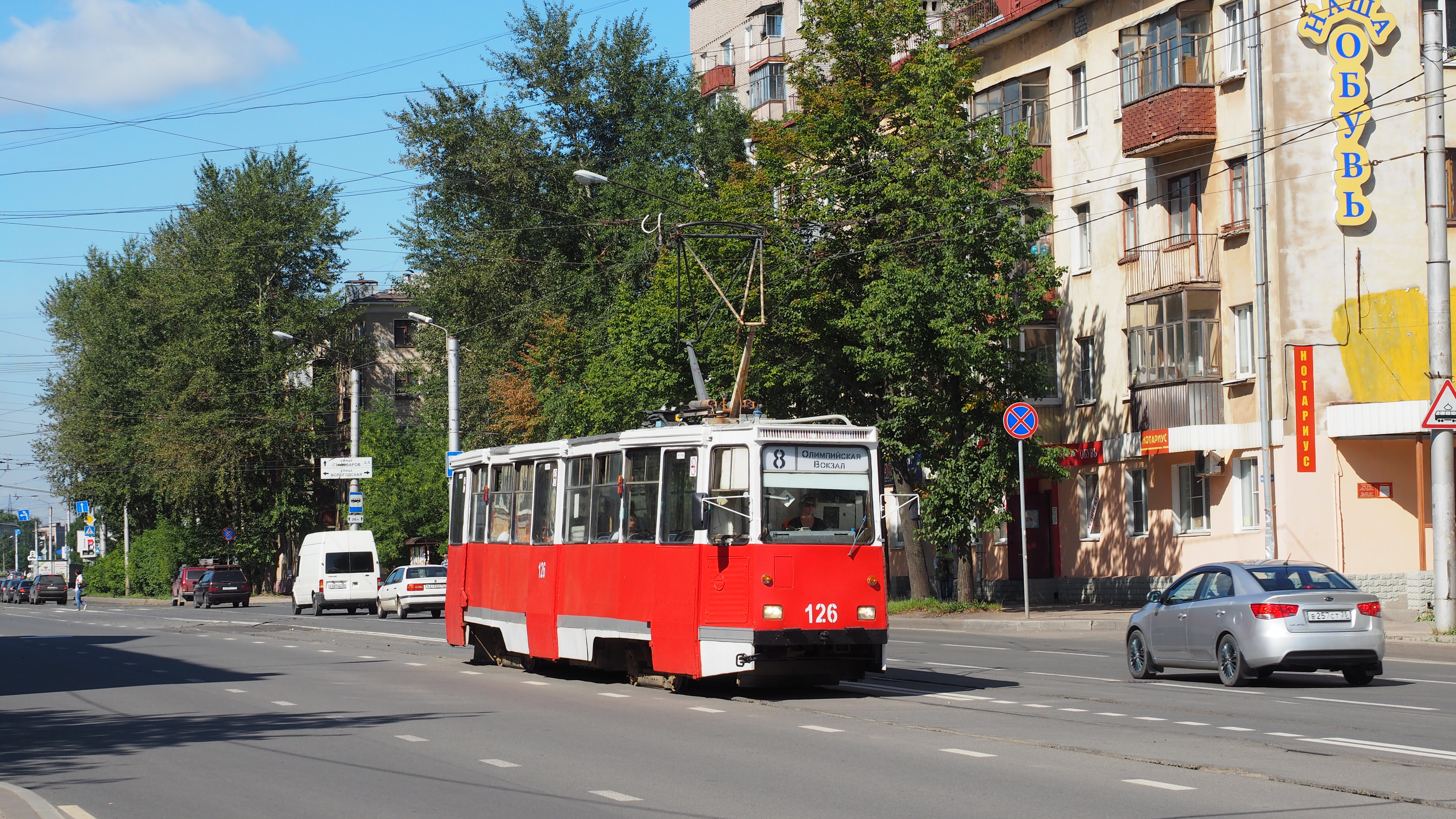
Cherepovets Trams

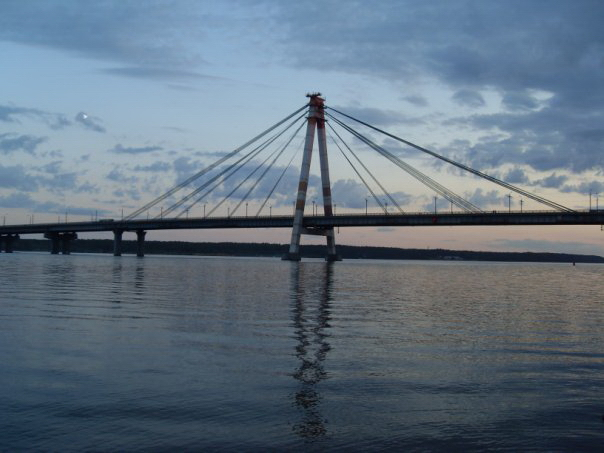
October bridge over Sheksna River, the first cable-stayed bridge in Russia

== Modern city ==
The passing years have left their mark on the city's appearance. Large-scale housing and industrial construction have been carried out in the city. Over the past years, hundreds of new multistory blocks of apartments, detached and semi-detached houses were built in Cherepovets.

Not only is Cherepovets an industrial city, but also it is a center of culture, education, and sport, with associations of local writers, poets, actors, painters, composers, and journalists.

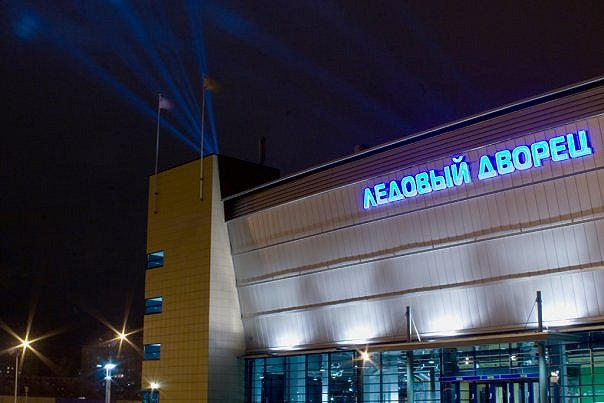
Ice Palace, the home stadium of Severstal Cherepovets

The city invests in sport and sports clubs. Cherepovets' athletes regularly compete in international and internal competitions. The Severstal Cherepovets hockey club is well known in Kontinental Hockey League. The Severstal basketball team, as well as the chess team, are a part of Russian Major League.

== Notable residents ==
- Vasily Vereshchagin (1842–1904), a famous battle painter, was born in Cherepovets.
- Anna Demidova (1878–1918), House of Romanovs maid, murdered with Nicholas II and his family, was born and raised in Cherepovets.
- Alexander Kutepov (1882–1930), White Army general, was born in Cherepovets.
- Igor Severyanin (1887–1941), poet, one of the main figures of the Russian Futurist movement, grew up in Cherepovets.
- Eupraxie Fedorovna Gurjanova (1902–1981), hydrobiologist, carcinologist and zoogeographer
- Valery Chkalov (1904–1938), aviator, studied at Cherepovets technical school.
- Nikolay Amosov (1913–2002), heart surgeon, was born near Cherepovets and got his education in the city.
- Joseph Brodsky (1940–1996), a Nobel Prize-winning poet and essayist, lived with his family in Cherepovets during the evacuation from Leningrad.
- Nikolai Noskov (born 1956), musician, former singer of Gorky Park, grew up and started his career in Cherepovets.
- Alexander Bashlachev (1960–1988), singer-songwriter and poet, was born and grew up in Cherepovets.
- Leonid Parfyonov (born 1960), journalist and television host, was born and grew up in Cherepovets.
- Dmitri Yushkevich (born 1970), NHL and KHL ice hockey player, was born in Cherepovets and started playing in the Metallurg Cherepovets hockey school.
- Vadim Shipachyov (born 1987 in Cherepovets), is a former NHL ice hockey player with the Vegas Golden Knights and now in the KHL with SKA St. Petersburg.
- Pavel Buchnevich (born 1995 in Cherepovets), is a former KHL and current NHL ice hockey player for the St. Louis Blues.

== Twin towns – sister cities ==
Cherepovets is twinned with:

- Aiud, Romania
- Balakovo, Russia
- Derry, United States
- Gorna Oryahovitsa, Bulgaria
- Liaoyuan, China
- Maladzyechna, Belarus

In 2022, (United States) Montclair ended its relationship with the city, in protest against the invasion of Ukraine by Russia.
