= Vologda I railway station =

Russian Railways station

Vologda I Вологда I
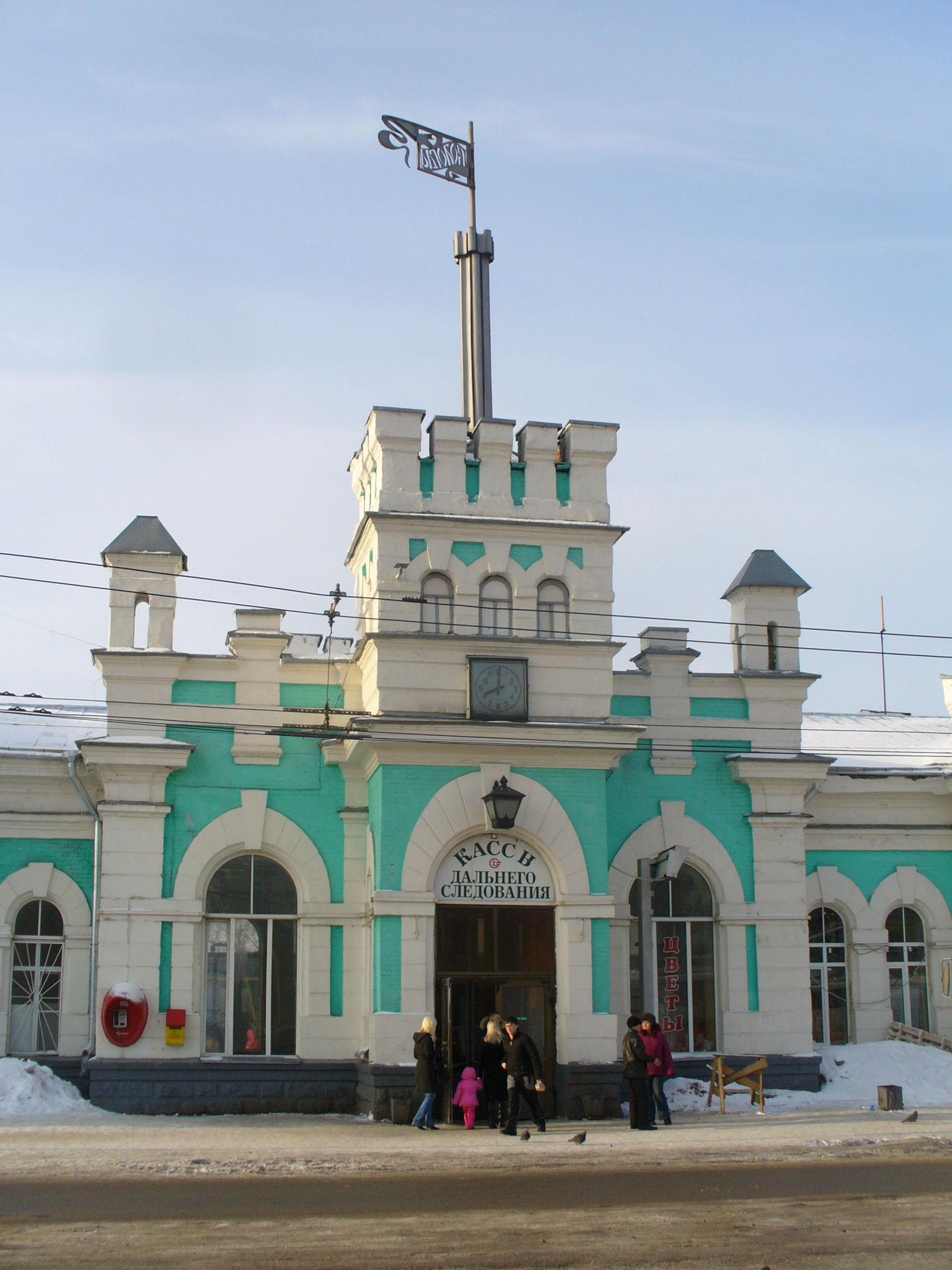

General information
- Other names: Vologda-1
- Location: Russia
- Coordinates: 59°12′25″N 39°52′58″E
- Owner: Russian Railways
- Operator: Russian Railways

Construction
- Parking: Available

Other information
- Status: Functioning
- Station code: 300107
- Fare zone: Northwestern Federal District

History
- Opened: 1872
Location

Vologda I (Russian: Вологда I, previously known as Vologda-Gorod, sometimes stylized as Vologda-1) is a railway station in Vologda, Russia. It opened in 1872 and is located on the Northern Railway.

== See also ==
- Vologda II railway station
