= Vologda Airport =

Airport in Russia

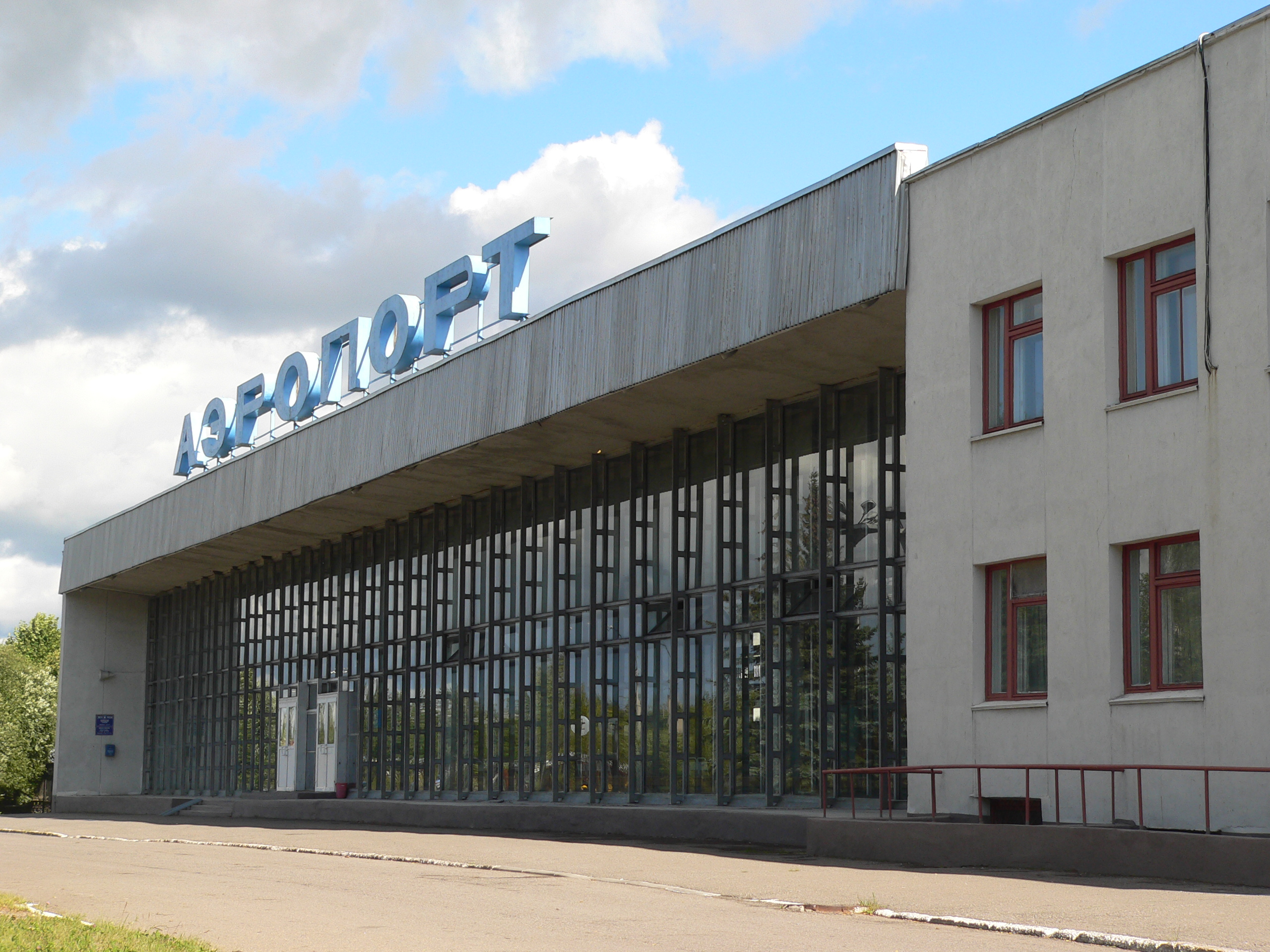
- IATA: VGD; ICAO: ULWW

Summary
- Airport type: Public
- Operator: JSC "Vologda Aviation Enterprise"
- Location: Vologda
- Elevation AMSL: 387 ft / 118 m
- Coordinates: 59°16′59″N 039°56′38″E
- Interactive map of Vologda Airport

Runways
Direction	Length		Surface
Direction	ft	m	Surface
15/33	4,921	1,500	Concrete

Vologda Airport (Russian: Аэропорт Вологда) (IATA: VGD, ICAO: ULWW) is an airport in Russia located 8 km north of Vologda. It services small airliners.

The airport has the head office of Vologda Aviation Enterprise.

== History ==
=== Reconstruction ===
In December 2024, the updated terminal of Vologda Airport was unveiled. Instead of overhauling the Soviet-era terminal from the 1970s, the restoration efforts focused on preserving its historical charm.

Originally built based on a standard Soviet design, the airport has remarkably maintained much of its character over the years. During the renovation, the goal was to retain as much of the original aesthetic as possible. The design team carefully kept the original finishes, glazing, wooden accents, marble, and even the Czech-made luggage scales and telephone booths intact. The security checkpoints have also been preserved in their vintage form.

Now, Vologda’s airport has become one of the most nostalgic Soviet-style airports in the country. In the terminal, you’ll find a retro-style buffet, a photo zone, as well as classic arcade games like Battleship and Hockey. A chess table has also been set up, and the walls are adorned with stylized posters from the Soviet era.

Flights from Vologda have a retro feel too, with Vologda Air still operating Yak-40s with three engines on routes to Moscow, St. Petersburg, and Veliky Ustyug.

=== New terminal ===
Another modern terminal is being constructed in Vologda, with a facade inspired by the arches of the Vologda Saint Sophia Cathedral. The design plans for this new terminal were unveiled in early December 2024. According to the project, by 2030, the terminal’s capacity will reach 272 passengers per hour.

The contractor for the government contract will be the JSC Design and Surveying and Scientific Research Institute of Air Transport Lenaeroproject. Construction and installation work is scheduled to begin in 2025.

The modernization project includes extending the runway from 1,500 meters to 2,500 meters, replacing the air traffic control lighting systems, and building a new passenger terminal. The existing terminal building will be preserved and transformed into an art space and museum.

During the reconstruction, Vologda Airport will be closed. The investment in the reconstruction of Vologda Airport is estimated at 11.8 billion rubles.

== Airlines and destinations ==
Airlines	Destinations
Vologda Aviation Enterprise	Moscow–Vnukovo, Saint Petersburg, Velikiy Ustyug

== See also ==
- List of airports in Russia
