= Vologda-Pristan railway station =

Railway station in Russia

Vologda-Pristan

General information
- Location: Russia
- Coordinates: 59°12′16″N 39°55′48″E
- Owner: Russian Railways
- Operator: Russian Railways

Construction
- Parking: Available

Other information
- Status: Functioning
- Station code: 300200
- Fare zone: Northwestern Federal District
Location

Vologda-Pristan (Russian: Вологда-Пристань) is an inland river port railway station in Vologda, Russia.
