= Vologda II railway station =

Railway station in Russia

Vologda II Вологда II

General information
- Other names: Vologda-2
- Location: Russia
- Coordinates: 59°13′40″N 39°50′47″E
- Owner: Russian Railways
- Operator: Russian Railways

Construction
- Parking: Available

Other information
- Status: Functioning
- Station code: 300304
- Fare zone: Northwestern Federal District

History
- Opened: 1906
Location

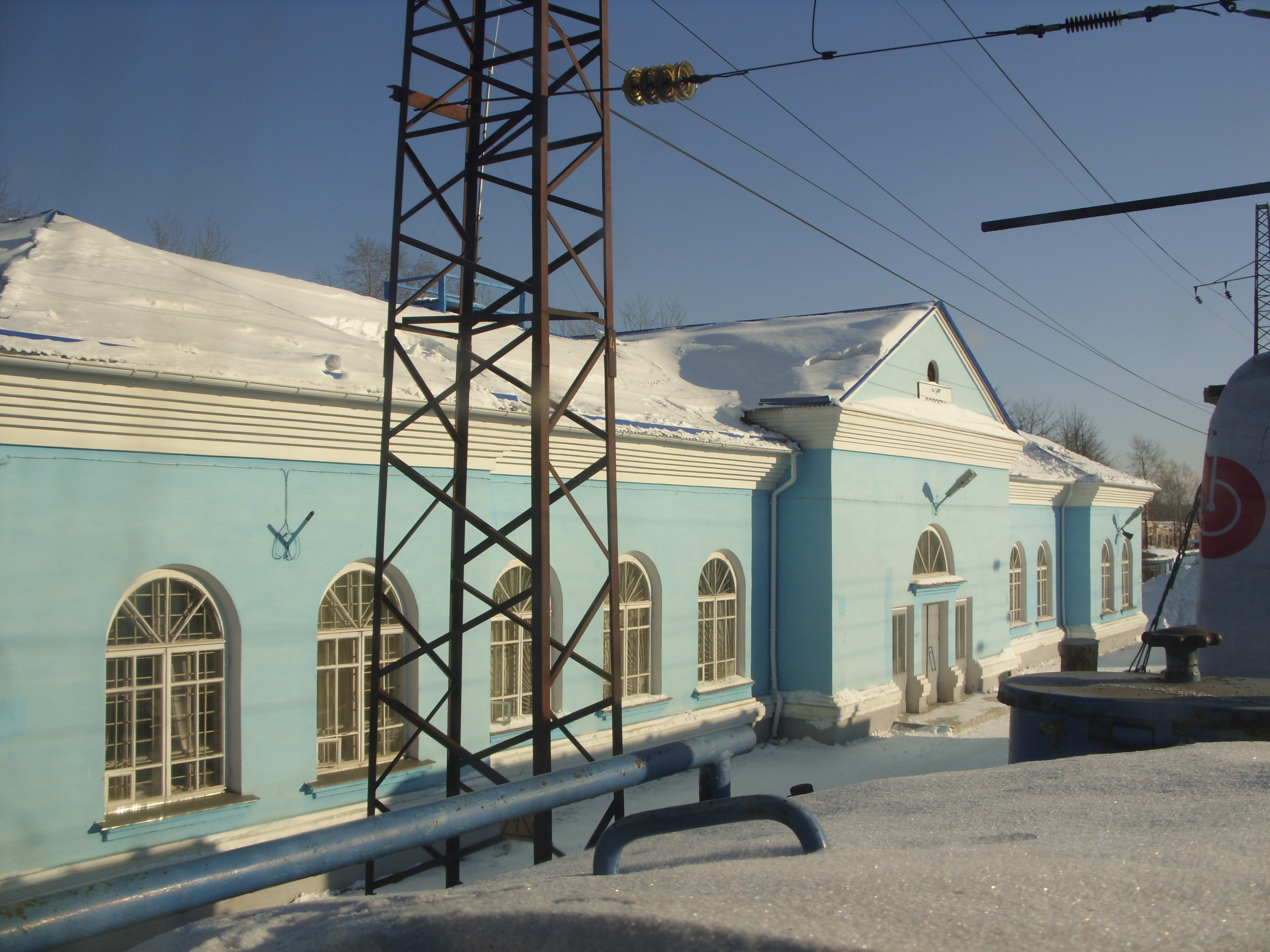
The Vologda II railway station building in Vologda, Russia

Vologda II (Russian: Вологда II), sometimes stylized as Vologda-2, is a railway station in Vologda, Russia. It is located on Northern Railway.

== See also ==
- Vologda I railway station
