= Botovo, Cherepovetsky District, Vologda Oblast =

Botovo Ботово
- Village
- Location within Vologda Oblast Location within Russia
- Coordinates: 59°15′N 37°57′E
- Country: Russia
- Region: Vologda Oblast
- District: Cherepovetsky District
- Time zone: UTC+3:00

Botovo (Russian: Ботово) is a rural locality (a village) and the administrative center of Yargomzhskoye Rural Settlement, Cherepovetsky District, Vologda Oblast, Russia. The population was 2,229 as of 2002. There are 15 streets.

== Geography ==
Botovo is located 18 km (11 mi) north of Cherepovets (the district's administrative centre) by road. Fenevo is the nearest rural locality.
