= Dagestan Airlines Flight 372 =

2010 aviation accident

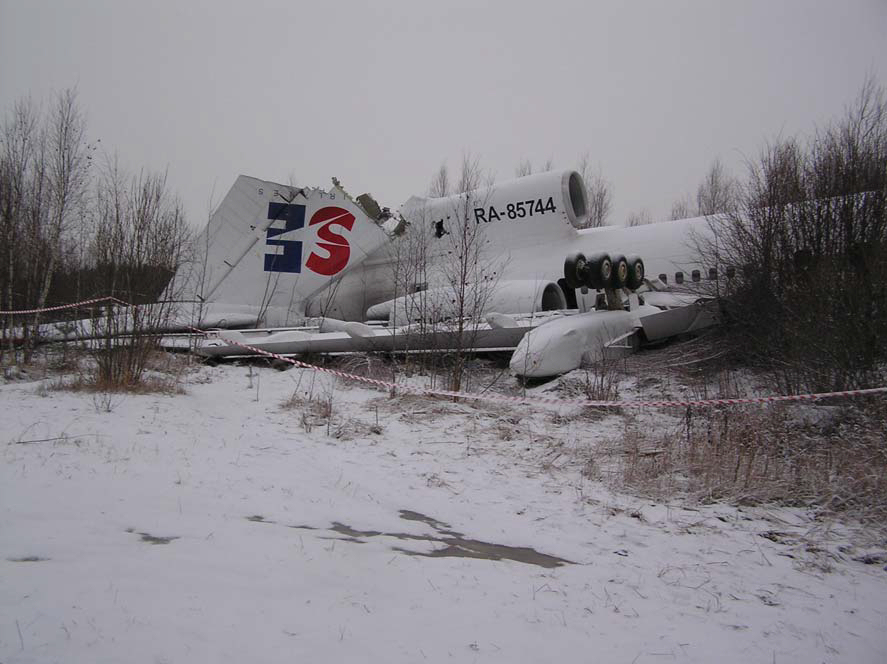
- The wreckage of Flight 372

Accident
- Date: 4 December 2010
- Summary: Crash-landed after dual engine flameout due to fuel starvation
- Site: Domodedovo International Airport, Moscow, Russia; 55°25′42″N 37°53′59″E

Aircraft
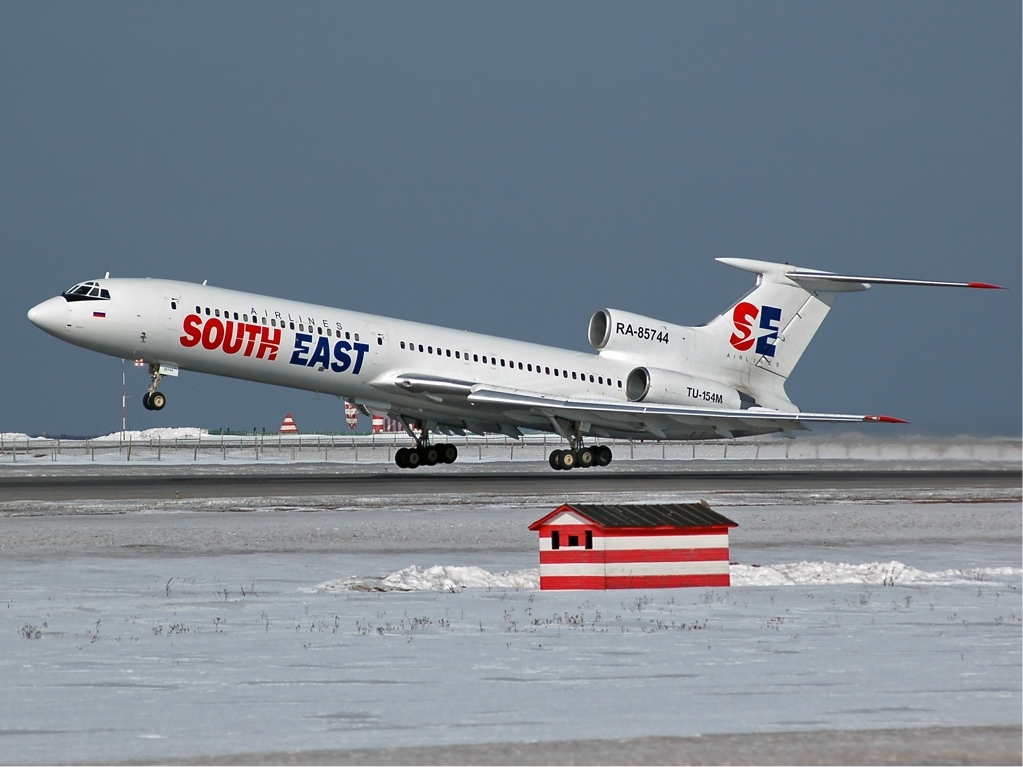
- RA-85744, the aircraft involved, pictured in March 2010
- Aircraft type: Tupolev Tu-154M
- Operator: Dagestan Airlines
- Call sign: DAGAL 372
- Registration: RA-85744
- Flight origin: Vnukovo International Airport, Moscow, Russia
- Destination: Uytash Airport, Makhachkala, Dagestan
- Occupants: 168
- Passengers: 160
- Crew: 8
- Fatalities: 2
- Injuries: 92
- Survivors: 166

Dagestan Airlines Flight 372 was a scheduled commercial flight between Moscow's Vnukovo Airport and Makhachkala, Russia. On 4 December 2010, the Tupolev Tu-154 operating the flight skidded off the runway following an emergency landing at Domodedovo Airport, 45 kilometres (28 mi; 24 nmi) south-east of Vnukovo. Two people on board were killed.

== Accident ==
The plane was flying a scheduled trip from Vnukovo Airport in Moscow to Uytash Airport in Makhachkala, Republic of Dagestan. Two of the aircraft's three engines failed shortly after takeoff at 14:07 local time (11:07 UTC); the pilots reported the loss of engines when the aircraft was at a height of around 9,100 metres (29,900 ft). An emergency landing at Domodedovo Airport was requested, and as the aircraft was in the process of landing, the third engine failed. The aircraft approached runway 32R from the right at an almost right angle, overflying the threshold before turning right at 500 metres (1,600 ft) to the left of the runway and crossing over the runway, flying parallel with but to the right of the runway. The aircraft touched down 88 metres (289 ft) to the right of the runway centreline, and only 350 metres (1,150 ft) short of the end, breaking up into three sections as it came to rest.

== Aircraft ==
The aircraft operating the flight was a tri-jet Tupolev Tu-154M, registered RA-85744, cn: 92A-927. Built in 1992, it had been overhauled in 2009 and was acquired by Dagestan Airlines in January 2010. Around that time, the airline rebranded itself as South East Airlines, and RA-85744 was painted with the new livery. The aircraft reportedly met all relevant European safety standards, and one month before the accident had been used to transport the Belgium national football team, a flight that required compliance with European regulations.

== Casualties ==
The emergency landing resulted in 2 fatalities and 92 injuries, of which 39 were serious.

One of the two dead was the brother of Magomedsalam Magomedov, the president of Dagestan. The other, the mother of a judge of the Constitutional Court of Russia, was initially reported by news media to have died of a heart attack, but the final report concluded she had died from impact injuries.

The number of people on board the plane was unclear; early reports said that between 163 and 172 people were on board, but a number of 168, eight of which were crew members, was later settled on.

== Investigation and trial ==
The final report by the Interstate Aviation Committee into the crash

Russian authorities dispatched investigators to the site of the emergency landing, classifying the investigation as a "criminal probe", according to the Russian Investigative Committee. Prosecutor General Yury Chaika was said to be "keeping a watchful eye" over the proceedings. Several hours after the incident occurred, the lead prosecutor in the investigation said that the preliminary results suggested a bird strike was responsible for the loss of engines.

By the day after the incident, investigators had recovered two of the aircraft's three flight recorders. The Interstate Aviation Committee (MAK) said that it had begun analysis of both recovered devices, which were said to be in "satisfactory condition". The third recorder, the cockpit voice recorder, was recovered on 10 December. Analysis of the flight data recorder showed that eight minutes after the aircraft took off, at an altitude of 6,500 metres (21,300 ft), the fuel supply to the engines fluctuated, and as the aircraft passed 9,000 metres (30,000 ft), the outer two engines shut down. The crew at this point began a descent towards Domodedovo Airport. The central engine had a "period of instability", but its normal status was "restored and maintained" until the aircraft's landing.

The fuel supply at Vnukovo Airport was confirmed to meet standards. On 1 April 2011, investigators announced that poor fuel quality had been ruled out as a cause of the crash, despite instrument readings that indicated issues with the fuel supply before the aircraft crashed.

On 26 September 2011, the MAK released its report concluding that the cause of the accident was the erroneous actions of the crew during the flight and approach in instrumental meteorological conditions with one engine running (out of three), which resulted in the aircraft approaching significantly to the right of the extended centre line, exiting the runway after landing and colliding with an embankment. The flight engineer accidentally shut off a fuel pump while transferring fuel. As a result, fuel flow fluctuated, leading to unusual altitude and engine readings before the outer two engines shut down. At this point, the crew chose to bring the plane to Domodedovo Airport. The report said that the crew had not used all available options to deal with the loss of engine power and had not followed procedures for landing with two nonfunctional engines. The report also noted that the crew had not been sufficiently trained to deal with the situation.

On 22 January 2015, the airplane's pilot Zakarzha Zakarzhayev was found guilty in court under article 263.3 of the Criminal Code of Russia (violating safety rules of transportation and air travel, which led by neglect to death of two or more people). He was given a suspended sentence of 3 years and then immediately amnestied.
