= Kotlas Airport =

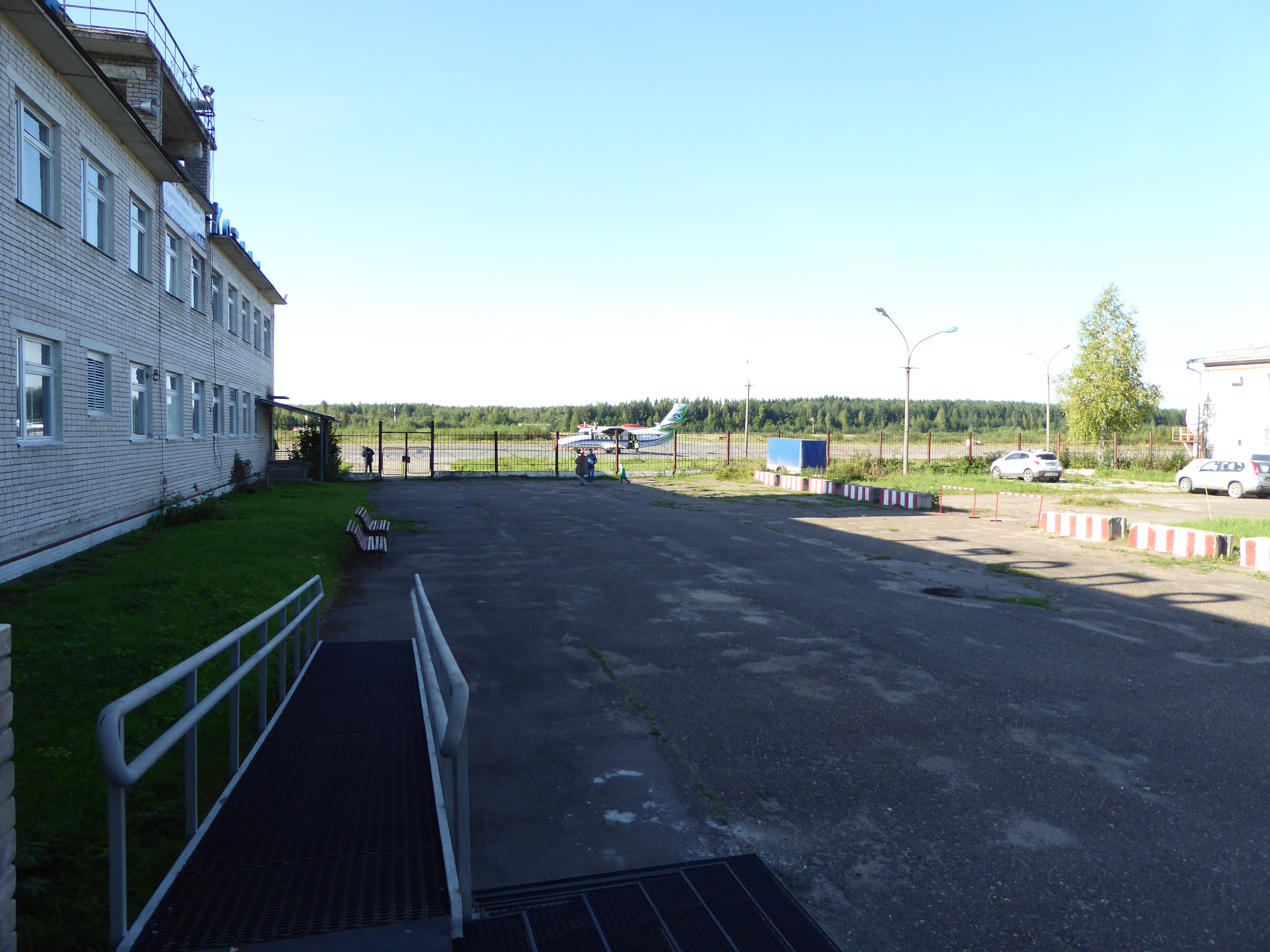
- IATA: KSZ; ICAO: ULKK

Summary
- Airport type: Public
- Operator: Transavia-Guarantee
- Serves: Kotlas
- Location: Kotlas, Russia
- Elevation AMSL: 184 ft / 56 m
- Coordinates: 61°14′12″N 46°41′48″E

Map
- Location of airport in Arkhangelsk Oblast

Runways
Direction	Length		Surface
Direction	ft	m	Surface
13/31	4,757	1,450	Asphalt

Kotlas Airport (Russian: Аэропорт Котлас) (IATA: KSZ, ICAO: ULKK) is a small airport in Arkhangelsk Oblast, Russia located 4 km southeast of Kotlas. It primarily services general aviation and small turboprop aircraft.

== Airlines and destinations ==
Airlines	Destinations
RusLine	Seasonal: Saint Petersburg

== See also ==
- List of airports in Russia
