= List of SCAT Airlines destinations =

This is a list of current and confirmed prospective destinations that SCAT Airlines and its subsidiaries Sunday Airlines and Southern Sky are serving.

== Destinations ==
A SCAT Airlines Boeing 737 MAX 8 at Hazrat Shahjalal International Airport, Dhaka

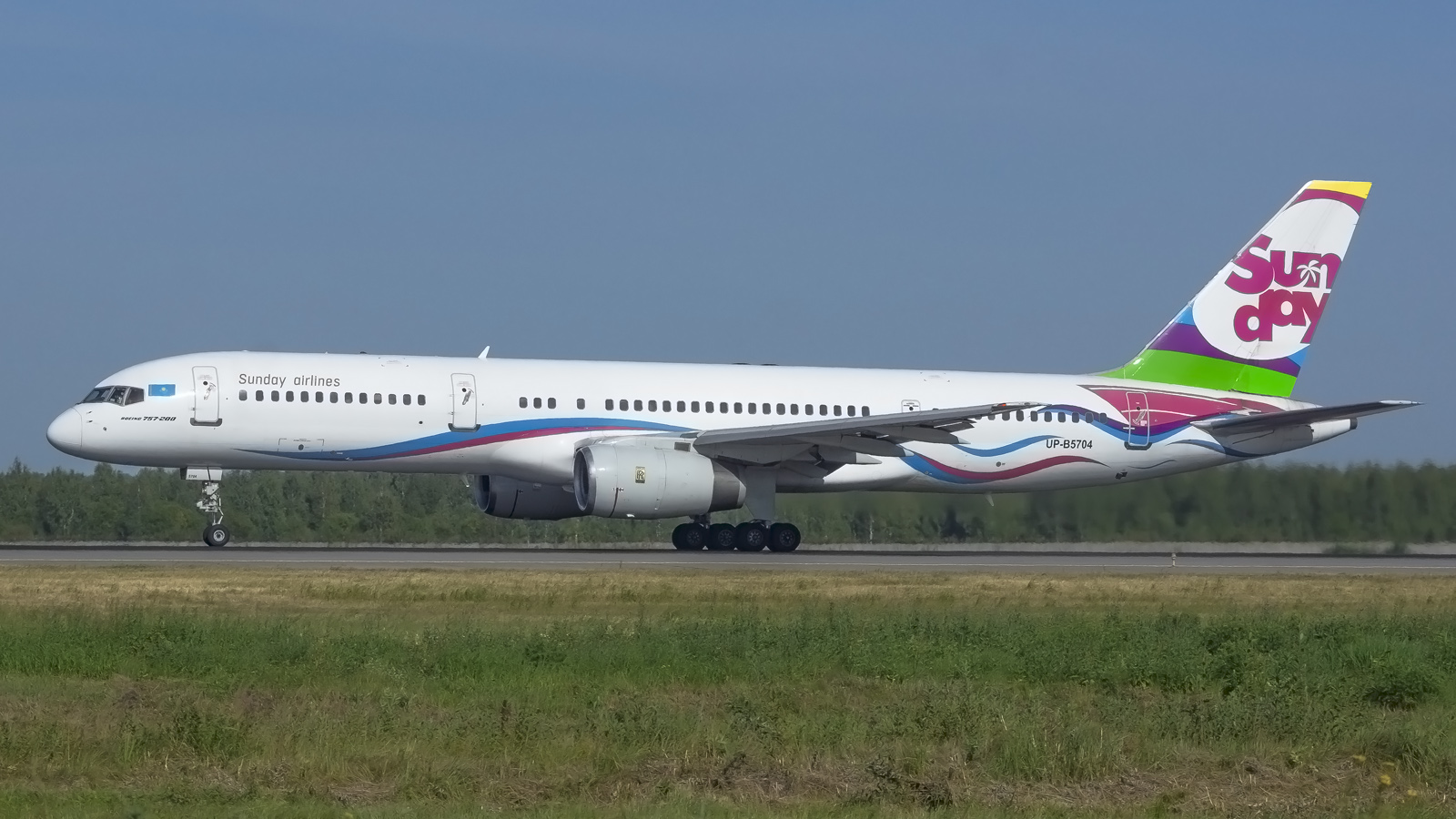
A Sunday Airlines Boeing 757-200 at Moscow Domodedovo Airport, Moscow

Abbreviation	Airline
SCA	SCAT Airlines
SUA	Sunday Airlines
SOU	Southern Sky

Note - Green background indicates carriers active on given routes; grey background indicates terminated services.

Country	City	Airport	IATA	ICAO	SCA	SUA	SOU	Notes	Refs
Armenia	Yerevan	EVN	UDYZ	Zvartnots International Airport	Yes				
Azerbaijan	Baku	GYD	UBBB	Heydar Aliyev International Airport	Yes	Yes			
Belarus	Minsk	MSQ	UMMS	Minsk National Airport	Yes				
China	Haikou	HAK	ZJHK	Haikou Meilan International Airport		Yes		Seasonal charter	
China	Sanya	SYX	ZJSY	Sanya Phoenix International Airport		Yes		Seasonal charter	
China	Shanghai	PVG	ZSPD	Shanghai Pudong International Airport	Yes				
China	Ürümqi	URC	ZWWW	Ürümqi Diwopu International Airport	Yes				
China	Xi'an	XIY	ZLXY	Xi'an Xianyang International Airport	Yes				
Czech Republic	Prague	PRG	LKPR	Václav Havel Airport Prague	Yes				
Egypt	Cairo	CAI	HECA	Cairo International Airport	Yes				
Egypt	Hurghada	HRG	HEGN	Hurghada International Airport		Yes		Seasonal charter	
Egypt	Sharm El Sheikh	SSH	HESH	Sharm El Sheikh International Airport		Yes		Seasonal charter	
Georgia	Batumi	BUS	UGSB	Batumi International Airport	Yes			Seasonal	
Georgia	Kutaisi	KUT	UGKO	Kutaisi International Airport	Yes			Seasonal	
Georgia	Tbilisi	TBS	UGTB	Tbilisi International Airport	Yes				
Germany	Munich	MUC	EDDM	Munich Airport	Yes				
Hungary	Budapest	BUD	LHBP	Budapest Ferenc Liszt International Airport		Yes		Seasonal charter	
India	Goa	GOI	VOGO	Dabolim Airport	Yes			Seasonal charter	
Japan	Tokyo	NRT	RJAA	Narita International Airport		Yes			
Kazakhstan	Almaty	ALA	UAAA	Almaty International Airport	Yes	Yes	Yes	Focus city	
Kazakhstan	Aktau	SCO	UATE	Aktau International Airport	Yes	Yes		Focus city	
Kazakhstan	Aktobe	AKX	UATT	Aliya Moldagulova International Airport	Yes	Yes			
Kazakhstan	Arkalyk	AYK	UAUR	Arkalyk Airport	Yes				
Kazakhstan	Astana	NQZ	UACC	Nursultan Nazarbayev International Airport	Yes	Yes	Yes	Focus city	
Kazakhstan	Atyrau	GUW	UATG	Atyrau International Airport	Yes				
Kazakhstan	Balkhash	BXH	UAAH	Balkhash Airport			Yes		
Kazakhstan	Jezkazgan	DZN	UAKD	Jezkazgan Airport	Yes				
Kazakhstan	Kokshetau	KOV	UACK	Kökşetau International Airport	Yes				
Kazakhstan	Karaganda	KGF	UAKK	Sary-Arka Airport	Yes	Yes			
Kazakhstan	Kostanay	KSN	UAUU	Qostanai International Airport	Yes	Yes			
Kazakhstan	Kyzylorda	KZO	UAOO	Qyzlorda International airport	Yes	✓			
Kazakhstan	Oral	URA	UARR	Mänşük Mämetova Oral International Airport	Yes	Yes			
Kazakhstan	Oskemen	UKK	UASK	Oskemen Airport	Yes	Yes	Yes		
Kazakhstan	Pavlodar	PWQ	UASP	Pavlodar International Airport	Yes	Yes			
Kazakhstan	Petropavl	PPK	UACP	Petropavl International Airport	Yes	Yes			
Kazakhstan	Semey	PLX	UASS	Semey International Airport	Yes	Yes	Yes		
Kazakhstan	Shymkent	CIT	UAII	Shymkent International Airport	Yes	Yes	Yes	Hub	
Kazakhstan	Taldykorgan	TDK	UAAT	Taldykorgan Airport	Yes				
Kazakhstan	Taraz	DMB	UADD	Taraz International Airport	Yes	Yes			
Kazakhstan	Turkestan	HSA	UAIT	Äziret Sūltan International Airport	Yes				
Kazakhstan	Urzhar	UZR	UASU	Urzhar Airport			Yes	Seasonal	
Kazakhstan	Usharal	USJ	UAAL	Usharal Airport	Yes			Seasonal	
Kazakhstan	Zaisan	SZI	UASZ	Zaisan Airport			Yes		
Kyrgyzstan	Bishkek	BSZ	UCFM	Manas International Airport		Yes			
Kyrgyzstan	Tamchy	IKU	UCFL	Issyk-Kul International Airport	Yes			Seasonal	
Lithuania	Vilnius	VNO	EYVI	Vilnius Airport	✓			Terminated	
Malaysia	Langkawi	LGK	WMKL	Langkawi International Airport		Yes		Seasonal charter	
Maldives	Malé	MLE	VRMM	Velana International Airport		Yes		Seasonal charter	
Mongolia	Olgii	ULG	ZMUL	Ölgii Airport	✓			Terminated	
Mongolia	Ulaanbaatar	ULN	ZMUB	Buyant-Ukhaa International Airport	Yes			Airport closed	
Mongolia	Ulaanbaatar	UBN	ZMCK	Chinggis Khaan International Airport	Yes				
Pakistan	Lahore	LHE	OPLA	Allama Iqbal International Airport				Terminated	
Russia	Astrakhan	ASF	URWA	Narimanovo Airport	Yes				
Russia	Chelyabinsk	CEK	USCC	Chelyabinsk Airport	✓			Terminated	
Russia	Kazan	KZN	UWKD	Ğabdulla Tuqay Kazan International Airport	✓				
Russia	Krasnodar	KRR	URKK	Krasnodar International Airport	Yes				
Russia	Krasnoyarsk	KJA	UNKL	Krasnoyarsk International Airport	Yes				
Russia	Makhachkala	MCX	URML	Uytash Airport	Yes				
Russia	Mineralnye Vody	MRV	URMM	Mineralnye Vody Airport	Yes				
Russia	Moscow	DME	UUDD	Moscow Domodedovo Airport	✓			Terminated	
Russia	Moscow	VKO	UUWW	Vnukovo International Airport	Yes				
Russia	Moscow	ZIA	UUBW	Zhukovsky International Airport	✓			Terminated	
Russia	Nizhnevartovsk	NJC	USNN	Nizhnevartovsk Airport	✓			Terminated	
Russia	Novosibirsk	OVB	UNNT	Tolmachevo Airport	✓				
Russia	Omsk	OMS	UNOO	Omsk Tsentralny Airport	✓			Terminated	
Russia	Rostov-on-Don	RVI	URRR	Rostov-on-Don Airport	✓			Terminated	
Russia	Saint Petersburg	LED	ULLI	Pulkovo Airport	✓				
Russia	Sochi	AER	URSS	Adler-Sochi International Airport	Yes			Seasonal	
Russia	Surgut	SGC	USRR	Surgut International Airport	✓			Terminated	
Russia	Tomsk	TOF	UNTT	Tomsk Kamov Airport	✓			Terminated	
Russia	Tyumen	TJM	USTR	Roshchino International Airport	✓			Terminated	
Russia	Ufa	UFA	UWUU	Mostay Kərim Ufa International Airport	✓			Seasonal charter	
Russia	Volgograd	VOG	URWW	Volgograd International Airport	✓			Terminated	
Russia	Voronezh	VOZ	UUOO	Voronezh International Airport	✓			Terminated	
Russia	Yekaterinburg	SVX	USSS	Koltsovo International Airport	✓			Terminated	
Russia / Ukraine (Note: Disputed. See Annexation of Crimea by the Russian Federation.)	Simferopol	SIP	UKFF	Simferopol International Airport	✓			Terminated	
Saudi Arabia	Jeddah	JED	OEJN	King Abdulaziz International Airport		Yes			
Saudi Arabia	Medina	MED	OEMA	Prince Mohammad bin Abdulaziz International Airport		Yes			
Serbia	Belgrade	BEG	LYBE	Belgrade Nikola Tesla Airport	Yes				
Singapore	Singapore	SIN	WSSS	Changi Airport	Yes				
South Korea	Seoul	ICN	RKSI	Incheon International Airport	Yes				
Sri Lanka	Colombo	CMB	VCBI	Bandaranaike International Airport		✓		Terminated	
Sri Lanka	Hambantota	HRI	VCRI	Mattala Rajapaksa International Airport	Yes			Seasonal charter	
Tajikistan	Dushanbe	DYU	UTDD	Dushanbe International Airport	Yes				
Tajikistan	Khujand	LBD	UTDL	Khujand Airport	✓			Terminated	
Thailand	Bangkok	BKK	VTBS	Suvarnabhumi Airport	Yes				
Thailand	Pattaya	UTP	VTBU	U-Tapao International Airport		Yes		Seasonal charter	
Thailand	Phuket	HKT	VTSP	Phuket International Airport		Yes		Seasonal charter	
Turkey	Antalya	AYT	LTAI	Antalya Airport		Yes		Seasonal	
Turkey	Bodrum	BJV	LTFE	Milas–Bodrum Airport		✓		Terminated	
Turkey	Istanbul	ISL	LTBA	Atatürk Airport	✓			Airport closed	
Turkey	Istanbul	IST	LTFM	Istanbul Airport	Yes				
Ukraine	Kyiv	KBP	UKBB	Boryspil International Airport	Yes			Terminated	
United Arab Emirates	Dubai	DXB	OMDB	Dubai International Airport	✓			Terminated	
United Arab Emirates	Sharjah	SHJ	OMSJ	Sharjah International Airport		Yes		Terminated	
Uzbekistan	Bukhara	BHK	UZSB	Bukhara International Airport	Yes				
Uzbekistan	Samarqand	SKD	UZSB	Samarqand International Airport	Yes				
Uzbekistan	Tashkent	TAS	UZBS	Islam Karimov Tashkent International Airport	Yes			Terminated	
Uzbekistan	Urgench	UGC	UTNU	Urgench International Airport	Yes				
Vietnam	Ho Chi Minh City	SGN	VVTS	Tan Son Nhat International Airport		✓		Terminated	
Vietnam	Nha Trang	CXR	VVCR	Cam Ranh International Airport		Yes		Seasonal charter	
