= List of the busiest airports in Kazakhstan =

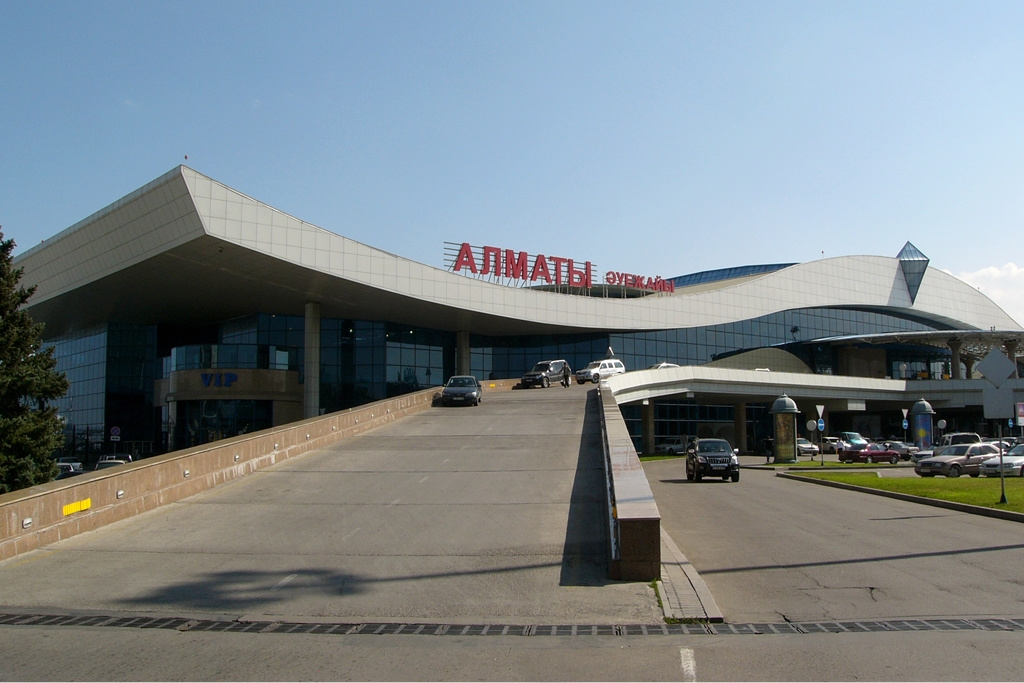
Almaty International Airport, the busiest airport in Kazakhstan

Nursultan Nazarbayev International Airport

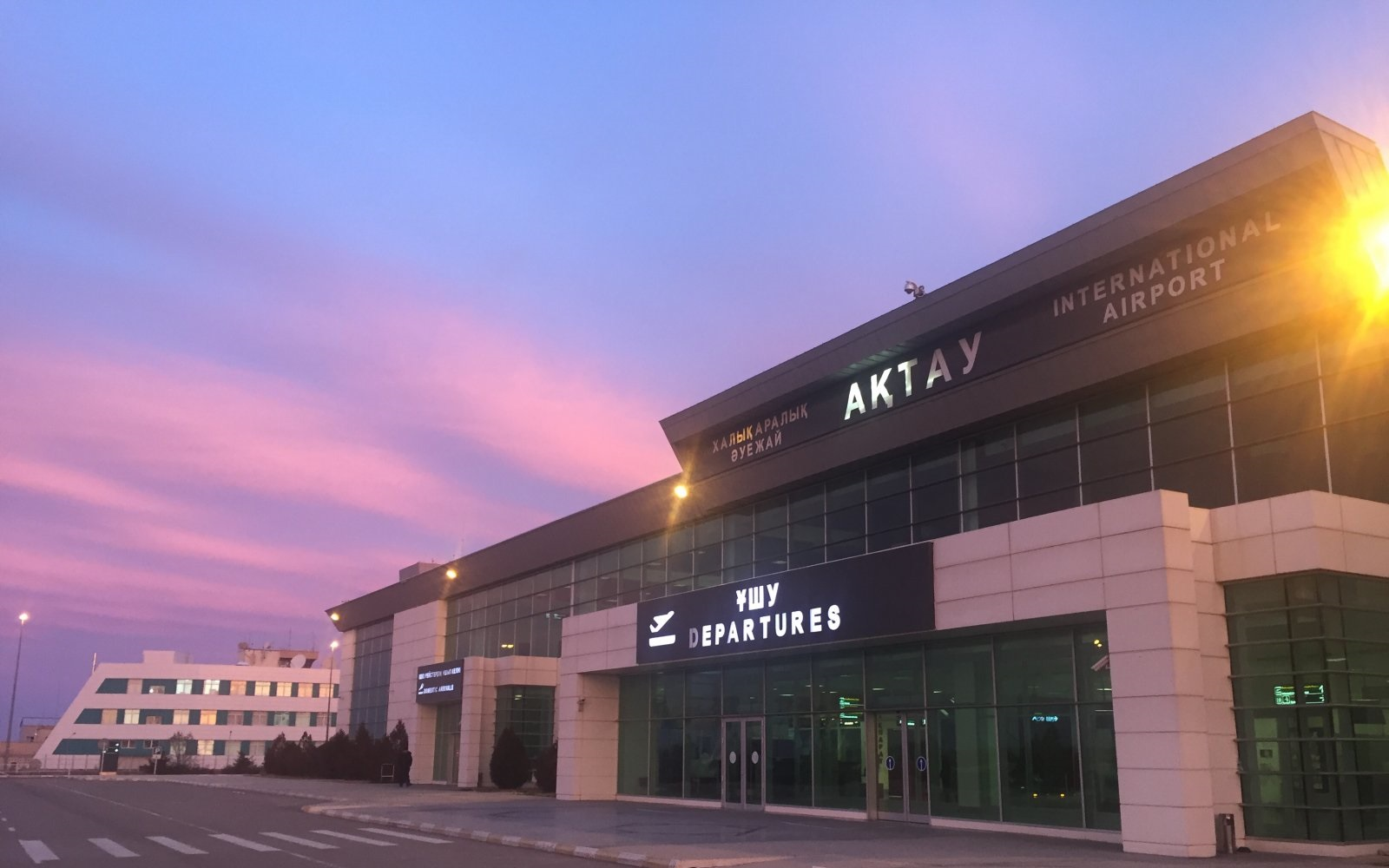
Aktau International Airport

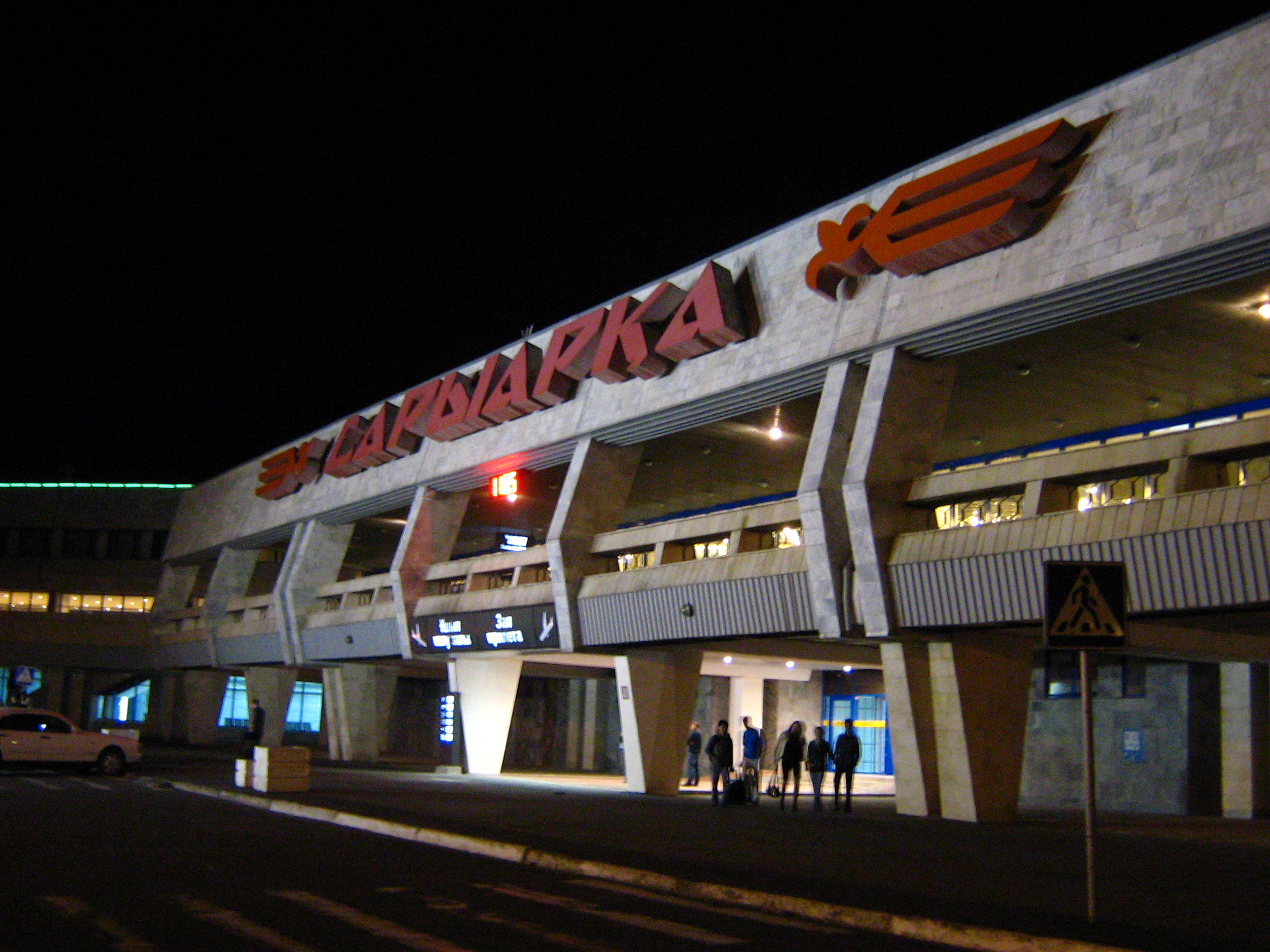
Sary-Arka Airport

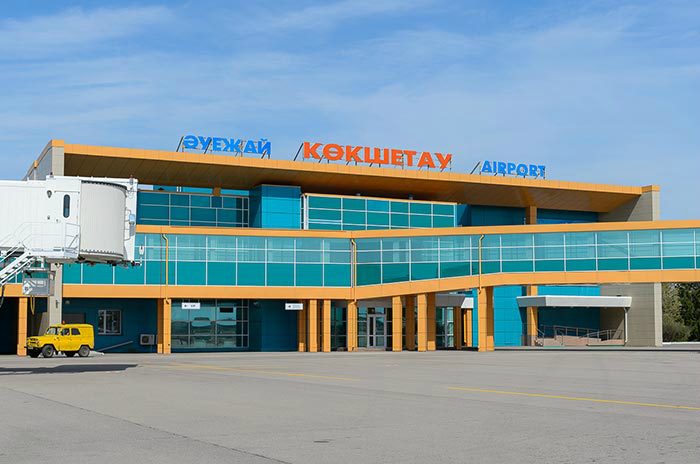
Kokshetau International Airport

This is a list of the busiest airports in Kazakhstan

== Kazakhstan's busiest airports by passenger traffic in 2019 ==
Rank	Airport	Region	City	IATA code	Passengers 2019
1	Almaty International Airport	Almaty	Almaty	ALA	6,422,721
2	Nursultan Nazarbayev International Airport	Nur-Sultan	Nur-Sultan	NQZ	5,099,391
3	Aktau Airport	Mangystau Region	Aktau	SCO	1,029,685
4	Shymkent International Airport	Shymkent	Shymkent	CIT	955,412
5	ATMA Atyrau Airport	Atyrau Region	Atyrau	GUW	937,032
?	Kokshetau Airport	Akmola Region	Kokshetau	KOV	21,683

== Kazakhstan's busiest airports by passenger traffic in 2018 ==
Rank	Airport	Region	City	IATA code	Passengers 2018
1	Almaty International Airport	Almaty	Almaty	ALA	5 686 933
2	Nursultan Nazarbayev International Airport	Astana	Astana	TSE	4 545 373
3	Aktau Airport	Mangystau Region	Aktau	SCO	1 022 750
4	ATMA Atyrau Airport	Atyrau Region	Atyrau	GUW	833 968
5	Shymkent International Airport	Shymkent	Shymkent	CIT	817 073
6	Aktobe Airport	Aktobe Region	Aktobe	AKX	411 248
7	Oskemen Airport	East Kazakhstan Region	Oskemen	UKK	393 034
8	Oral Ak Zhol Airport	West Kazakhstan Region	Oral	URA	273 095
9	Sary-Arka Airport	Karaganda Region	Karaganda	KGF	271 411
10	Kyzylorda Airport	Kyzylorda Region	Kyzylorda	KZO	203 386
11	Kostanay Airport	Kostanay Region	Kostanay	KSN	190 855
12	Pavlodar Airport	Pavlodar Region	Pavlodar	PWQ	180 204
13	Taraz Airport	Jambyl Region	Taraz	DMB	63 261
14	Taldykorgan Airport	Almaty Region	Taldykorgan	TDK	37 225
15	Zhezkazgan Airport	Karaganda Region	Zhezkazgan	DZN	33 898
16	Semey Airport	East Kazakhstan Region	Semey	PLX	27 098
17	Kokshetau Airport	Akmola Region	Kokshetau	KOV	21 427
18	Petropavl Airport	North Kazakhstan Region	Petropavl	PPK	18 410

== Kazakhstan's busiest airports by passenger traffic in 2017 ==
Rank	Airport	Region	City	IATA code	Passengers 2017
1	Almaty International Airport	Almaty	Almaty	ALA	5 640 810
2	Nursultan Nazarbayev International Airport	Astana	Astana	TSE	4 260 526
3	Aktau Airport	Mangystau Region	Aktau	SCO	1 062 514
4	Shymkent International Airport	Shymkent	Shymkent	CIT	811 114
5	ATMA Atyrau Airport	Atyrau Region	Atyrau	GUW	778 795
6	Aktobe Airport	Aktobe Region	Aktobe	AKX	411 248
7	Oskemen Airport	East Kazakhstan Region	Oskemen	UKK	346 571
8	Oral Ak Zhol Airport	West Kazakhstan Region	Oral	URA	267 390
9	Sary-Arka Airport	Karaganda Region	Karaganda	KGF	254 838
10	Kyzylorda Airport	Kyzylorda Region	Kyzylorda	KZO	211 951
11	Pavlodar Airport	Pavlodar Region	Pavlodar	PWQ	188 169
12	Kostanay Airport	Kostanay Region	Kostanay	KSN	151 662
13	Taraz Airport	Jambyl Region	Taraz	DMB	58 802
14	Semey Airport	East Kazakhstan Region	Semey	PLX	50 958
15	Taldykorgan Airport	Almaty Region	Taldykorgan	TDK	29 929
16	Zhezkazgan Airport	Karaganda Region	Zhezkazgan	DZN	28 817
17	Kokshetau Airport	Akmola Region	Kokshetau	KOV	22 031
18	Petropavl Airport	North Kazakhstan Region	Petropavl	PPK	16 776

== Kazakhstan's busiest airports by passenger traffic in 2016 ==
Rank	Airport	Region	City	IATA code	Passengers 2016
1	Almaty International Airport	Almaty	Almaty	ALA	4 878 450
2	Astana International Airport	Astana	Astana	TSE	3 446 665
3	Aktau Airport	Mangystau Region	Aktau	SCO	865 809
4	ATMA Atyrau Airport	Atyrau Region	Atyrau	GUW	624 604
5	Shymkent International Airport	Shymkent	Shymkent	CIT	621 380
6	Aktobe Airport	Aktobe Region	Aktobe	AKX	338 138
7	Oskemen Airport	East Kazakhstan Region	Oskemen	UKK	286 613
8	Sary-Arka Airport	Karaganda Region	Karaganda	KGF	222 445
9	Kyzylorda Airport	Kyzylorda Region	Kyzylorda	KZO	197 788
10	Oral Ak Zhol Airport	West Kazakhstan Region	Oral	URA	189 200
11	Pavlodar Airport	Pavlodar Region	Pavlodar	PWQ	177 050
12	Kostanay Airport	Kostanay Region	Kostanay	KSN	117 214
13	Semey Airport	East Kazakhstan Region	Semey	PLX	66 235
14	Taraz Airport	Jambyl Region	Taraz	DMB	55 172
15	Taldykorgan Airport	Almaty Region	Taldykorgan	TDK	26 768
16	Zhezkazgan Airport	Karaganda Region	Zhezkazgan	DZN	26 624
17	Kokshetau Airport	Akmola Region	Kokshetau	KOV	14 213
18	Petropavl Airport	North Kazakhstan Region	Petropavl	PPK	4 009

== Kazakhstan's busiest airports by passenger traffic in 2015 ==
Rank	Airport	Region	City	IATA code	Passengers 2015
1	Almaty International Airport	Almaty	Almaty	ALA	4 905 307
2	Astana International Airport	Astana	Astana	TSE	3 363 472
3	Aktau Airport	Mangystau Region	Aktau	SCO	796 042
4	ATMA Atyrau Airport	Atyrau Region	Atyrau	GUW	609 071
5	Shymkent International Airport	Shymkent	Shymkent	CIT	550 873
6	Aktobe Airport	Aktobe Region	Aktobe	AKX	344 333
7	Oskemen Airport	East Kazakhstan Region	Oskemen	UKK	304 778
8	Sary-Arka Airport	Karaganda Region	Karaganda	KGF	284 495
9	Kyzylorda Airport	Kyzylorda Region	Kyzylorda	KZO	226 964
10	Oral Ak Zhol Airport	West Kazakhstan Region	Oral	URA	166 838
11	Pavlodar Airport	Pavlodar Region	Pavlodar	PWQ	163 465
12	Kostanay Airport	Kostanay Region	Kostanay	KSN	131 923
13	Semey Airport	East Kazakhstan Region	Semey	PLX	66 453
14	Taraz Airport	Jambyl Region	Taraz	DMB	41 492
15	Atyrau Airport	Atyrau Region	Atyrau	GUW	41 254
16	Zhezkazgan Airport	Karaganda Region	Zhezkazgan	DZN	29 518
17	Kokshetau Airport	Akmola Region	Kokshetau	KOV	17 416
18	Taldykorgan Airport	Almaty Region	Taldykorgan	TDK	12 876
19	Petropavl Airport	North Kazakhstan Region	Petropavl	PPK	6 756

== Kazakhstan's busiest airports by passenger traffic in 2014 ==
Rank	Airport	Region	City	IATA code	Passengers 2014
1	Almaty International Airport	Almaty	Almaty	ALA	4 588 885
2	Astana International Airport	Astana	Astana	TSE	2 915 760
3	Aktau Airport	Mangystau Region	Aktau	SCO	813 964
4	ATMA Atyrau Airport	Atyrau Region	Atyrau	GUW	564 526
5	Shymkent International Airport	Shymkent	Shymkent	CIT	442 645
6	Aktobe Airport	Aktobe Region	Aktobe	AKX	321 800
7	Oskemen Airport	East Kazakhstan Region	Oskemen	UKK	277 565
8	Sary-Arka Airport	Karaganda Region	Karaganda	KGF	267 009
9	Kyzylorda Airport	Kyzylorda Region	Kyzylorda	KZO	152 375
10	Pavlodar Airport	Pavlodar Region	Pavlodar	PWQ	122 488
11	Kostanay Airport	Kostanay Region	Kostanay	KSN	119 787
12	Oral Ak Zhol Airport	West Kazakhstan Region	Oral	URA	117 606
13	Semey Airport	East Kazakhstan Region	Semey	PLX	61 857
14	Taraz Airport	Jambyl Region	Taraz	DMB	36 895
15	Atyrau Airport	Atyrau Region	Atyrau	GUW	34 971
16	Zhezkazgan Airport	Karaganda Region	Zhezkazgan	DZN	31 963
17	Petropavl Airport	North Kazakhstan Region	Petropavl	PPK	16 350
18	Taldykorgan Airport	Almaty Region	Taldykorgan	TDK	13 491
19	Kokshetau Airport	Akmola Region	Kokshetau	KOV	3 064

== Kazakhstan's busiest airports by passenger traffic in 2013 ==
Rank	Airport	Region	City	IATA code	Passengers 2013
1	Almaty International Airport	Almaty	Almaty	ALA	4 323 220
2	Astana International Airport	Astana	Astana	TSE	2 609 431
3	Aktau Airport	Mangystau Region	Aktau	SCO	777 522
4	ATMA Atyrau Airport	Atyrau Region	Atyrau	GUW	553 195
5	Aktobe Airport	Aktobe Region	Aktobe	AKX	297 228
6	Shymkent International Airport	Shymkent	Shymkent	CIT	264 690
7	Sary-Arka Airport	Karaganda Region	Karaganda	KGF	196 201
8	Oral Ak Zhol Airport	West Kazakhstan Region	Oral	URA	135 504
9	Oskemen Airport	East Kazakhstan Region	Oskemen	UKK	124 893
10	Pavlodar Airport	Pavlodar Region	Pavlodar	PWQ	123 964
11	Atyrau Airport	Atyrau Region	Atyrau	GUW	108 550
12	Kyzylorda Airport	Kyzylorda Region	Kyzylorda	KZO	75 028
13	Kostanay Airport	Kostanay Region	Kostanay	KSN	62 125
14	Semey Airport	East Kazakhstan Region	Semey	PLX	25 179
15	Petropavl Airport	North Kazakhstan Region	Petropavl	PPK	20 830
16	Taraz Airport	Jambyl Region	Taraz	DMB	16 264
17	Zhezkazgan Airport	Karaganda Region	Zhezkazgan	DZN	14 741
18	Taldykorgan Airport	Almaty Region	Taldykorgan	TDK	11 633
19	Kokshetau Airport	Akmola Region	Kokshetau	KOV	1 572

== Kazakhstan's busiest airports by passenger traffic in 2012 ==
Rank	Airport	Region	City	IATA code	Passengers 2012
1	Almaty International Airport	Almaty	Almaty	ALA	4 002 976
2	Astana International Airport	Astana	Astana	TSE	2 303 148
3	Aktau Airport	Mangystau Region	Aktau	SCO	708 327
4	ATMA Atyrau Airport	Atyrau Region	Atyrau	GUW	549 074
5	Aktobe Airport	Aktobe Region	Aktobe	AKX	288 076
6	Shymkent International Airport	Shymkent	Shymkent	CIT	186 266
7	Sary-Arka Airport	Karaganda Region	Karaganda	KGF	171 646
8	Oral Ak Zhol Airport	West Kazakhstan Region	Oral	URA	144 684
9	Pavlodar Airport	Pavlodar Region	Pavlodar	PWQ	121 310
10	Oskemen Airport	East Kazakhstan Region	Oskemen	UKK	112 432
11	Atyrau Airport	Atyrau Region	Atyrau	GUW	107 307
12	Kyzylorda Airport	Kyzylorda Region	Kyzylorda	KZO	72 261
13	Kostanay Airport	Kostanay Region	Kostanay	KSN	56 200
14	Taraz Airport	Jambyl Region	Taraz	DMB	24 074
15	Semey Airport	East Kazakhstan Region	Semey	PLX	23 086
16	Petropavl Airport	North Kazakhstan Region	Petropavl	PPK	20 830
17	Taldykorgan Airport	Almaty Region	Taldykorgan	TDK	14 862
18	Zhezkazgan Airport	Karaganda Region	Zhezkazgan	DZN	14 411
19	Kokshetau Airport	Akmola Region	Kokshetau	KOV	2 353

== See also ==
- List of the busiest airports in Asia
- List of the busiest airports in Europe
- List of the busiest airports in the former USSR
