= List of airports in Kazakhstan =

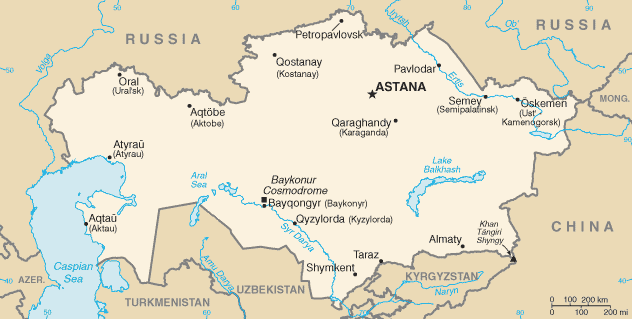
Map of Kazakhstan

This is a list of airports in Kazakhstan, sorted by location. Aerodromes here are listed with their 4-letter ICAO code, and 3-letter IATA code (where available).

Kazakhstan is a unitary state consisting of seventeen regions. The capital city of Kazakhstan is Astana.

== Airports ==
Airport names shown in bold indicate the facility has scheduled passenger service on a commercial airline.

City served/Location	ICAO	IATA	Airport name	Coordinates
Aktau	UATE	SCO	**Aktau International Airport**	43°51′36″N 051°05′31″E
Aktobe	UATT	AKX	**Aktobe International Airport**	50°14′45″N 57°12′24″E
Almaty	UAAA	ALA	**Almaty International Airport**	43°21′19″N 077°02′41″E
Almaty	UAAR	BXJ	Boraldai Airport	43°21′06″N 076°52′57″E
Arkalyk	UAUR	AYK	Arkalyk Airport	50°19′30″N 066°57′36″E
Astana	UACC	NQZ	**Nursultan Nazarbayev International Airport**	51°01′19″N 071°28′01″E
Atbasar		ATX	Atbasar Airport	51°51′06″N 68°21′48″E
Atyrau	UATG	GUW	**Atyrau Airport**	47°07′19″N 051°49′17″E
Baikonur	UAON		Yubileyniy Airport	46°03′N 63°14′E
Balkhash	UAAH	BXH	Balkhash Airport	46°53′38″N 075°00′19″E
Ekibastuz	UASB	EKB	Ekibastuz Airport	51°35′N 075°13′E
Karaganda	UAKK	KGF	**Sary-Arka Airport** (Karaganda Airport)	49°40′17″N 073°20′11″E
Kenderali Resort	UATB		Kenderali Airport	42°56'06"N 052°32'54"E
Kokshetau	UACK	KOV	**Kokshetau International Airport**	53°19′48″N 069°35′48″E
Kok-Sary	UAIK		Bozhban Airport	42°44'44"N 067°28'51"E
Kostanay	UAUU	KSN	**Kostanay Airport**	53°12′25″N 063°33′01″E
Kulsary	UATZ		Tengiz Airport	46°18.12′N 53°25.65′E
Kyzylorda	UAOO	KZO	**Kyzylorda Airport**	44°42′25″N 065°35′33″E
Oral	UARR	URA	**Oral Ak Zhol Airport** (Uralsk Airport)	51°09′03″N 051°32′35″E
Oskamen	UASW		Katon Karagay Airport	
Oskemen	UASK	UKK	**Oskemen Airport** (Ust-Kamenogorsk Airport)	50°02′10″N 082°29′39″E
Pavlodar	UASP	PWQ	**Pavlodar Airport**	52°11′42″N 077°04′26″E
Petropavl	UACP	PPK	**Petropavl Airport** (Petropavlovsk Airport)	54°46′28″N 069°11′06″E
Satpay	UASI		Satpay Airport	
Semey	UASS	PLX	**Semey Airport** (Semipalatinsk Airport)	50°21′05″N 080°14′04″E
Shymkent	UAII	CIT	**Shymkent International Airport**	42°21′54″N 069°28′34″E
Taldykorgan	UAAT	TDK	**Taldykorgan Airport**	45°07′21″N 078°26′34″E
Taraz	UADD	DMB	**Taraz Airport**	42°51′13″N 071°18′13″E
Turkistan	UAIT	HSA	**Hazrat Sultan International Airport**	43°18′40″N 068°33′01″E
Urzhar	UASU	UZR	**Urzhar Airport**	47°05′32″N 081°39′27″E
Usharal	UAAL	USJ	**Usharal Airport**	46°11′25″N 080°49′53″E
Vostochny			Ush Tobe Airport	50°33′13″N 66°38′57″E
Zaysan	UASZ	SZI	**Zaysan Airport**	47°29′13″N 084°53′17″E
Zhezkazgan	UAKD	DZN	**Zhezkazgan Airport**	47°42′32″N 067°44′21″E

== See also ==
- Transport in Kazakhstan
- List of airports by ICAO code: U#Kazakhstan
- Wikipedia: WikiProject Aviation/Airline destination lists: Asia#Kazakhstan
