= List of Air Astana destinations =

An Air Astana Airbus A321neo at Frankfurt Airport, Frankfurt

This is a list of confirmed and prospective destinations that Air Astana is flying to:

== Destinations ==
Country	City	Airport	Notes	Refs
Azerbaijan	Baku	Heydar Aliyev International Airport		
China	Beijing	Beijing Capital International Airport		
China	Chengdu	Chengdu Shuangliu International Airport	Terminated	
China	Chengdu	Chengdu Tianfu International Airport	Terminated	
China	Guangzhou	Guangzhou Baiyun International Airport		
China	Shanghai	Shanghai Pudong International Airport		
China	Ürümqi	Ürümqi Tianshan International Airport		
Cyprus	Larnaca	Larnaca International Airport	Seasonal	
Egypt	Sharm El Sheikh	Sharm El Sheikh International Airport	Resumes 10 December 2026	
Egypt	Hurghada	Hurghada International Airport	Seasonal charter	
Finland	Kittilä	Kittilä Airport	Seasonal charter	
France	Paris	Charles de Gaulle Airport	Terminated	
Georgia	Tbilisi	Tbilisi International Airport		
Germany	Frankfurt	Frankfurt Airport		
Germany	Hanover	Hannover Airport	Seasonal	
Greece	Heraklion	Heraklion International Airport	Seasonal	
Hong Kong	Hong Kong	Hong Kong International Airport	Terminated	
India	Delhi	Indira Gandhi International Airport		
India	Goa	Dabolim Airport	Seasonal	
India	Mumbai	Chhatrapati Shivaji Maharaj International Airport		
Iran	Tehran	Tehran Imam Khomeini International Airport	Terminated	
Israel	Tel Aviv	David Ben Gurion Airport	Terminated	
Kazakhstan	Almaty	Almaty International Airport	Hub	
Kazakhstan	Aqtau	Aqtau Airport		
Kazakhstan	Aqtobe	Aliya Moldagulova International Airport		
Kazakhstan	Astana	Nursultan Nazarbayev International Airport	Hub	
Kazakhstan	Atyrau	Atyrau Airport	Focus city	
Kazakhstan	Jezqazğan	Jezqazğan Airport	Terminated	
Kazakhstan	Oral	Oral Ak Zhol Airport		
Kazakhstan	Öskemen	Öskemen Airport		
Kazakhstan	Pavlodar	Pavlodar Airport	Terminated	
Kazakhstan	Petropavl	Petropavl Airport	Terminated	
Kazakhstan	Qarağandy	Sary-Arka Airport	Terminated	
Kazakhstan	Qostanai	Qostanai Airport	Terminated	
Kazakhstan	Qyzylorda	Qyzylorda Airport		
Kazakhstan	Şymkent	Şymkent International Airport		
Kazakhstan	Taraz	Taraz Airport	Terminated	
Kyrgyzstan	Bishkek	Manas International Airport		
Kyrgyzstan	Osh	Osh Airport		
Malaysia	Kuala Lumpur	Kuala Lumpur International Airport	Terminated	
Malaysia	Langkawi	Langkawi International Airport	Begins 25 December 2025	
Maldives	Malé	Velana International Airport		
Montenegro	Podgorica	Podgorica Airport	Seasonal	
Netherlands	Amsterdam	Amsterdam Airport Schiphol		
Oman	Salalah	Salalah International Airport		
Qatar	Doha	Hamad International Airport		
Russia	Kazan	Ğabdulla Tuqay Kazan International Airport	Terminated	
Russia	Moscow	Moscow Domodedovo Airport	Terminated	
Russia	Moscow	Sheremetyevo International Airport	Terminated	
Russia	Novosibirsk	Tolmachevo Airport	Terminated	
Russia	Omsk	Omsk Tsentralny Airport	Terminated	
Russia	Orenburg	Orenburg Tsentralny Airport	Terminated	
Russia	Samara	Kurumoch International Airport	Terminated	
Russia	Saint Petersburg	Pulkovo Airport	Terminated	
Russia	Tyumen	Roschino International Airport	Terminated	
Russia	Yekaterinburg	Koltsovo International Airport	Terminated	
Saudi Arabia	Jeddah	King Abdulaziz International Airport		
Saudi Arabia	Medina	Prince Mohammad bin Abdulaziz International Airport		
South Korea	Seoul	Incheon International Airport		
Sri Lanka	Colombo	Bandaranaike International Airport	Seasonal	
Tajikistan	Dushanbe	Dushanbe International Airport		
Thailand	Bangkok	Suvarnabhumi Airport		
Thailand	Phuket	Phuket International Airport		
Turkey	Antalya	Antalya Airport		
Turkey	Bodrum	Milas–Bodrum Airport	Seasonal	
Turkey	Istanbul	Istanbul Airport		
Turkey	Istanbul	Istanbul Atatürk Airport	Airport closed	
Ukraine	Kyiv	Boryspil International Airport	Terminated	
United Arab Emirates	Abu Dhabi	Zayed International Airport	Suspended	
United Arab Emirates	Dubai	Dubai International Airport		
United Kingdom	London	Heathrow Airport		
Uzbekistan	Samarqand	Samarqand International Airport	Terminated	
Uzbekistan	Tashkent	Tashkent International Airport		
Vietnam	Da Nang	Da Nang International Airport		
Vietnam	Ho Chi Minh City	Tan Son Nhat International Airport	Terminated	
Vietnam	Nha Trang	Cam Ranh International Airport		
Vietnam	Phu Quoc	Phu Quoc International Airport		
