= List of Aeroflot destinations =

An Aeroflot Boeing 777-300ER at Incheon International Airport, Seoul

This list covers former and current destinations of PJSC Aeroflot – Russian Airlines.

In September 2018, Aeroflot served 146 destinations in 52 countries. In 2022, the number of destinations was significantly reduced after many countries banned Russian aircraft as a result of the 2022 Russian invasion of Ukraine.

== History ==
The history of Aeroflot can be traced back to 9 February 1923, when the Council of Labour and Defence passed a resolution to create the Civil Air Fleet of the USSR, amalgamating all pioneer airlines to form Dobrolet on 25 March 1923. Operations started on 15 July 1923 linking Moscow and Nizhny Novgorod, becoming the first regular services of the country. The name Aeroflot was adopted in 1932 after the reorganisation of Dobrolet. By the end of the 1930s the carrier had the following routes in operation: Kharkiv–Kyiv, Kharkiv–Odesa, Kyiv–Odesa, Kyiv–Rostov–Mineralnye Vody, Kyiv–Simferopol, Moscow–Leningrad, Moscow–Minsk, Moscow–Odesa, Moscow–Sochi, Moscow–Kuybishev, Moscow–Baku–Tbilisi, Moscow–Simferopol, Moscow–Stalingrad–Astrakhan, Tbilisi–Sukhumi, Tbilisi–Yerevan, Kutasi–Mestia and Sukhumi–Sochi. Aeroflot's route network was 31,500 kilometres (19,600 miles) long by 1950.

By April 1965, the carrier operated an extensive domestic and international network that included Accra, Amsterdam, Bamako, Brussels, Cairo, Conakry, Copenhague, Delhi, Djakarta, Havana, Helsinki, Kabul, Karachi, Khartoum, London, Paris, Rabat, Rangoon, Stockholm and Vienna; routes to Algiers, Baghdad, Brazzaville, Colombo, Nicosia, Teheran and Tunis, all of them inaugurated in 1964, were also flown. In March 1970, Aeroflot had amassed a route network that was 600,000 kilometres (370,000 miles) long, a quarter of which covered international destinations. At this time, the carrier had agreements with 59 countries but it only served 54 of them, including 55 destinations.

Once the world's largest carrier, Aeroflot did not restrict its operations to the transportation of passengers, but monopolised all civil aviation activities within the Soviet Union. Apart from passenger transportation that covered a domestic network of over 3,600 villages, towns and cities, activities undertaken by the airline that were labelled as "non-transport tasks" included agricultural work, ice reconnaissance, anti-forest fire patrol, and aeromedical services, among many others. The former monopolistic Aeroflot – Soviet Airlines entered a new era following the dissolution of the USSR, when it shrank dramatically as it was split into several regional companies throughout the Commonwealth of Independent States in mid–1992. It was gradually reorganised and renamed Aeroflot – Russian International Airlines (ARIA). In mid-2000, the name of the company was changed to simply Aeroflot – Russian Airlines.

At March 2000, Moscow Sheremetyevo Airport was the carrier's main base; the airport was also one of its hubs, along with Novosibirsk, Saint Petersburg and Vladivostok, from where it operated scheduled international services to several cities internationally, and domestic flights to Adler/Sochi, Anapa, Arkhangelsk, Belgorod, Bratsk, Ekaterinburg, Irkutsk, Kaliningrad, Khabarovsk, Krasnodar, Murmansk, Naryan-Mar, Nizhnevartovsk, Nizhniy Novgorod, Omsk, Petropavlovsk-Kamchatsky, Rostov, Samara, Volgograd and Yuzhno-Sakhalinsk.

== List ==
Following is a list of destinations the carrier flies to according to its passenger and cargo schedules as of July 2026, or the dates specified in each reference. Terminated destinations once served by Aeroflot within the post-1992 era are also included.

Country	City	Airport	Notes	Refs
Afghanistan	Kabul	Kabul International Airport	Terminated	
Algeria	Algiers	Houari Boumediene Airport	Terminated	
Angola	Luanda	Quatro de Fevereiro Airport	Terminated	
Argentina	Buenos Aires	Ministro Pistarini International Airport	Terminated	
Armenia	Gyumri	Gyumri Shirak International Airport	Passenger	
Armenia	Yerevan	Zvartnots International Airport	Passenger	
Australia	Sydney	Sydney Airport	Terminated	
Austria	Innsbruck	Innsbruck Airport	Terminated	
Austria	Salzburg	Salzburg Airport	Terminated	
Austria	Vienna	Vienna International Airport	Terminated	
Azerbaijan	Baku	Heydar Aliyev International Airport	Passenger	
Bahrain	Manama	Bahrain International Airport	Terminated	
Bangladesh	Dhaka	Hazrat Shahjalal International Airport	Terminated	
Belarus	Minsk	Minsk National Airport	Passenger	
Belgium	Brussels	Brussels Airport	Terminated	
Benin	Cotonou	Cadjehoun Airport	Terminated	
Brazil	São Paulo	São Paulo/Guarulhos International Airport	Terminated	
Bulgaria	Burgas	Burgas Airport	Terminated	
Bulgaria	Sofia	Sofia Airport	Terminated	
Bulgaria	Varna	Varna Airport	Terminated	
Burkina Faso	Ouagadougou	Ouagadougou Airport	Terminated	
Burundi	Bujumbura	Bujumbura International Airport	Terminated	
Cambodia	Phnom Penh	Phnom Penh International Airport	Terminated	
Cameroon	Douala	Douala International Airport	Terminated	
Canada	Montreal	Montréal–Trudeau International Airport	Terminated	
Canada	Toronto	Toronto Pearson International Airport	Terminated	
Cape Verde	Sal	Amílcar Cabral International Airport	Terminated	
Chile	Santiago	Arturo Merino Benítez International Airport	Terminated	
China	Beijing	Beijing Capital International Airport	Terminated	
China	Beijing	Beijing Daxing International Airport	Passenger	
China	Guangzhou	Guangzhou Baiyun International Airport	Passenger	
China	Sanya	Sanya Phoenix International Airport	Passenger	
China	Shanghai	Shanghai Pudong International Airport	Passenger	
China	Shenyang	Shenyang Taoxian International Airport	Terminated	
China	Ürümqi	Ürümqi Diwopu International Airport	Terminated	
Croatia	Dubrovnik	Dubrovnik Airport	Terminated	
Croatia	Split	Split Airport	Terminated	
Croatia	Zagreb	Zagreb Airport	Terminated	
Cuba	Havana	José Martí International Airport	Terminated	
Cuba	Varadero	Juan Gualberto Gómez Airport	Terminated	
Cyprus	Larnaca	Larnaca International Airport	Terminated	
Cyprus	Paphos	Paphos International Airport	Terminated	
Czech Republic	Karlovy Vary	Karlovy Vary Airport	Terminated	
Czech Republic	Prague	Václav Havel Airport Prague	Terminated	
Denmark	Copenhagen	Copenhagen Airport	Terminated	
Djibouti	Djibouti City	Djibouti–Ambouli International Airport	Terminated	
Dominican Republic	Punta Cana	Punta Cana International Airport	Terminated	
Egypt	Cairo	Cairo International Airport	Passenger	
Egypt	Hurghada	Hurghada International Airport	Passenger	
Egypt	Sharm El Sheikh	Sharm El Sheikh International Airport	Passenger	
Estonia	Tallinn	Tallinn Airport	Terminated	
Ethiopia	Addis Ababa	Addis Ababa Bole International Airport	Terminated	
Finland	Helsinki	Helsinki Airport	Terminated	
Finland	Rovaniemi	Rovaniemi Airport	Terminated	
France	Lyon	Lyon–Saint-Exupéry Airport	Terminated	
France	Marseille	Marseille Provence Airport	Terminated	
France	Nice	Nice Côte d'Azur Airport	Terminated	
France	Paris	Charles de Gaulle Airport	Terminated	
France	Paris	Orly Airport	Terminated	
Georgia	Batumi	Batumi International Airport	Terminated	
Georgia	Sukhumi (Note: Sukhumi is the capital of Abkhazia, a self-declared independent state that is internationally recognised as an autonomous republic of Georgia.)	Sukhumi Dranda Airport	Terminated	
Georgia	Tbilisi	Tbilisi International Airport	Temporarily suspended	
Germany	Berlin	Berlin Brandenburg Airport	Terminated	
Germany	Berlin	Berlin Schönefeld Airport	Airport closed	
Germany	Cologne	Cologne Bonn Airport	Terminated	
Germany	Dresden	Dresden Airport	Terminated	
Germany	Düsseldorf	Düsseldorf Airport	Terminated	
Germany	Frankfurt	Frankfurt Airport	Terminated	
Germany	Hamburg	Hamburg Airport	Terminated	
Germany	Hanover	Hannover Airport	Terminated	
Germany	Leipzig	Leipzig/Halle Airport	Terminated	
Germany	Munich	Munich Airport	Terminated	
Germany	Stuttgart	Stuttgart Airport	Terminated	
Ghana	Accra	Accra International Airport	Terminated	
Greece	Athens	Athens International Airport	Terminated	
Greece	Heraklion	Heraklion International Airport	Terminated	
Greece	Thessaloniki	Thessaloniki International Airport	Terminated	
Guinea	Conakry	Conakry International Airport	Terminated	
Hong Kong	Hong Kong	Hong Kong International Airport	Passenger	
Hong Kong	Hong Kong	Kai Tak Airport	Airport closed	
Hungary	Budapest	Budapest Ferenc Liszt International Airport	Terminated	
India	Delhi	Indira Gandhi International Airport	Passenger	
India	Goa	Dabolim Airport	Resumes 3 October 2026	
India	Goa	Manohar International Airport	Seasonal	
India	Kolkata	Netaji Subhas Chandra Bose International Airport	Terminated	
India	Mumbai	Chhatrapati Shivaji Maharaj International Airport	Terminated	
Indonesia	Denpasar	Ngurah Rai International Airport	Passenger	
Indonesia	Jakarta	Soekarno–Hatta International Airport	Terminated	
Iran	Tehran	Tehran Imam Khomeini International Airport	Passenger	
Iraq	Baghdad	Baghdad International Airport	Terminated	
Ireland	Dublin	Dublin Airport	Terminated	
Ireland	Shannon	Shannon Airport	Terminated	
Israel	Eilat	Ovda Airport	Airport Closed	
Israel	Tel Aviv	David Ben Gurion International Airport	Terminated	
Italy	Bologna	Bologna Guglielmo Marconi Airport	Terminated	
Italy	Milan	Milan Malpensa Airport	Terminated	
Italy	Naples	Naples International Airport	Terminated	
Italy	Rimini	Federico Fellini International Airport	Terminated	
Italy	Rome	Rome Fiumicino Airport	Terminated	
Italy	Venice	Venice Marco Polo Airport	Terminated	
Italy	Verona	Verona Villafranca Airport	Terminated	
Jamaica	Kingston	Norman Manley International Airport	Terminated	
Japan	Aomori	Aomori Airport	Terminated	
Japan	Hakodate	Hakodate Airport	Terminated	
Japan	Nagoya	Chubu Centrair International Airport	Terminated	
Japan	Niigata	Niigata Airport	Terminated	
Japan	Tokyo	Narita International Airport	Terminated	
Japan	Toyama	Toyama Airport	Terminated	
Jordan	Amman	Queen Alia International Airport	Terminated	
Kazakhstan	Aktau	Aktau International Airport	Passenger	
Kazakhstan	Aktobe	Aktobe International Airport	Passenger	
Kazakhstan	Almaty	Almaty International Airport	Passenger	
Kazakhstan	Astana	Nursultan Nazarbayev International Airport	Passenger	
Kazakhstan	Atyrau	Atyrau Airport	Passenger	
Kazakhstan	Karagandy	Sary-Arka Airport	Passenger	
Kazakhstan	Kostanay	Kostanay Airport	Passenger	
Kazakhstan	Kyzylorda	Kyzylorda Airport	Passenger	
Kazakhstan	Shymkent	Shymkent International Airport	Passenger	
Kenya	Nairobi	Jomo Kenyatta International Airport	Terminated	
Kuwait	Kuwait City	Kuwait International Airport	Terminated	
Kyrgyzstan	Bishkek	Manas International Airport	Passenger	
Kyrgyzstan	Osh	Osh Airport	Passenger	
Laos	Vientiane	Wattay International Airport	Terminated	
Latvia	Riga	Riga International Airport	Terminated	
Libya	Tripoli	Tripoli International Airport	Terminated	
Lithuania	Kaunas	Kaunas Airport	Terminated	
Lithuania	Vilnius	Vilnius Airport	Terminated	
Luxembourg	Luxembourg	Luxembourg Airport	Terminated	
Macedonia	Skopje	Skopje International Airport	Terminated	
Madagascar	Antananarivo	Ivato International Airport	Terminated	
Malaysia	Kuala Lumpur	Kuala Lumpur International Airport	Terminated	
Maldives	Malé	Velana International Airport	Passenger	
Mali	Bamako	Bamako–Sénou International Airport	Terminated	
Malta	Malta	Malta International Airport	Terminated	
Mexico	Mexico City	Mexico City International Airport	Terminated	
Moldova	Chișinău	Chișinău International Airport	Terminated	
Mongolia	Ulaanbaatar	Buyant-Ukhaa International Airport	Airport closed	
Morocco	Casablanca	Mohammed V International Airport	Terminated	
Myanmar	Yangon	Yangon International Airport	Terminated	
Nepal	Kathmandu	Tribhuvan International Airport	Terminated	
Netherlands	Amsterdam	Amsterdam Airport Schiphol	Terminated	
Nicaragua	Managua	Augusto C. Sandino International Airport	Terminated	
Nigeria	Lagos	Murtala Muhammed International Airport	Terminated	
Norway	Kirkenes	Kirkenes Airport	Terminated	
Norway	Oslo	Oslo Fornebu Airport	Terminated	
Norway	Oslo	Oslo Gardermoen Airport	Terminated	
Norway	Tromsø	Tromsø Airport	Terminated	
North Korea	Pyongyang	Pyongyang International Airport	Terminated	
Pakistan	Karachi	Jinnah International Airport	Terminated	
Peru	Lima	Jorge Chávez International Airport	Terminated	
Philippines	Manila	Ninoy Aquino International Airport	Terminated	
Poland	Kraków	Kraków John Paul II International Airport	Terminated	
Poland	Warsaw	Warsaw Chopin Airport	Terminated	
Portugal	Lisbon	Lisbon Airport	Terminated	
Qatar	Doha	Hamad International Airport	Seasonal charter	
Republic of the Congo	Brazzaville	Maya-Maya Airport	Terminated	
Romania	Bucharest	Henri Coandă International Airport	Terminated	
Russia	Abakan	Abakan International Airport	Passenger	
Russia	Anadyr	Ugolny Airport	Terminated	
Russia	Anapa	Vityazevo Airport	Terminated	
Russia	Arkhangelsk	Talagi Airport	Passenger	
Russia	Astrakhan	Narimanovo Airport	Passenger	
Russia	Barnaul	Barnaul Airport	Passenger	
Russia	Belgorod	Belgorod International Airport	Terminated	
Russia	Blagoveshchensk	Ignatyevo Airport	Passenger	
Russia	Bratsk	Bratsk Airport	Terminated	
Russia	Bryansk	Bryansk International Airport	Terminated	
Russia	Chelyabinsk	Chelyabinsk Airport	Passenger	
Russia	Chita	Chita-Kadala International Airport	Terminated	
Russia	Elista	Elista Airport	Passenger	
Russia	Gelendzhik	Gelendzhik Airport	Passenger	
Russia	Grozny	Kadyrov Grozny International Airport	Passenger	
Russia	Igarka	Igarka Airport	Terminated	
Russia	Irkutsk	International Airport Irkutsk	Passenger	
Russia	Izhevsk	Izhevsk Airport	Passenger	
Russia	Kaliningrad	Khrabrovo Airport	Passenger	
Russia	Kazan	Kazan International Airport	Passenger	
Russia	Kemerovo	Alexei Leonov Kemerovo International Airport	Passenger	
Russia	Khabarovsk	Khabarovsk Novy Airport	Passenger	
Russia	Khanty-Mansiysk	Khanty-Mansiysk Airport	Passenger	
Russia	Kirov	Pobedilovo Airport	Terminated	
Russia	Krasnodar	Krasnodar International Airport	Passenger	
Russia	Krasnoyarsk	Krasnoyarsk International Airport	Passenger	
Russia	Magadan	Sokol Airport	Terminated	
Russia	Magas	Magas Airport	Passenger	
Russia	Magnitogorsk	Magnitogorsk International Airport	Passenger	
Russia	Makhachkala	Uytash Airport	Passenger	
Russia	Mirny	Mirny Airport	Terminated	
Russia	Moscow	Sheremetyevo International Airport	Hub	
Russia	Murmansk	Murmansk Airport	Passenger	
Russia	Nadym	Nadym Airport	Terminated	
Russia	Nalchik	Nalchik Airport	Passenger	
Russia	Naryan-Mar	Naryan-Mar Airport	Terminated	
Russia	Nazran	Magas Airport	Passenger	
Russia	Nefteyugansk	Nefteyugansk Airport	Terminated	
Russia	Neryungri	Chulman Neryungri Airport	Terminated	
Russia	Nizhnekamsk	Begishevo Airport	Passenger	
Russia	Nizhnevartovsk	Nizhnevartovsk Airport	Passenger	
Russia	Nizhny Novgorod	Strigino International Airport	Passenger	
Russia	Norilsk	Alykel International Airport	Terminated	
Russia	Novokuznetsk	Spichenkovo Airport	Passenger	
Russia	Novosibirsk	Tolmachevo Airport	Passenger	
Russia	Novy Urengoy	Novy Urengoy Airport	Terminated	
Russia	Noyabrsk	Noyabrsk Airport	Terminated	
Russia	Omsk	Omsk Tsentralny Airport	Passenger	
Russia	Orenburg	Orenburg Tsentralny Airport	Passenger	
Russia	Orsk	Orsk Airport	Passenger	
Russia	Penza	Penza Vissarion Belinsky Airport	Passenger	
Russia	Perm	Perm International Airport	Passenger	
Russia	Petropavlovsk-Kamchatsky	Petropavlovsk-Kamchatsky Airport	Passenger	
Russia	Petrozavodsk	Petrozavodsk Airport	Terminated	
Russia	Rostov-on-Don	Platov International Airport	Terminated	
Russia	Rostov-on-Don	Rostov-on-Don Airport	Airport closed	
Russia	Saint Petersburg	Pulkovo Airport	Passenger	
Russia	Salekhard	Salekhard Airport	Terminated	
Russia	Samara	Kurumoch International Airport	Passenger	
Russia	Saransk	Saransk Airport	Passenger	
Russia	Saratov	Saratov Gagarin Airport	Passenger	
Russia	Saratov	Saratov Tsentralny Airport	Airport Closed	
Russia	Sochi	Adler-Sochi International Airport		
Russia	Stavropol	Stavropol Shpakovskoye Airport	Passenger	
Russia	Surgut	Farman Salmanov Surgut Airport	Passenger	
Russia	Syktyvkar	Syktyvkar Airport	Passenger	
Russia	Tiksi	Tiksi Airport	Terminated	
Russia	Tomsk	Tomsk Kamov Airport	Passenger	
Russia	Tyumen	Roschino International Airport	Passenger	
Russia	Ufa	Ufa International Airport	Passenger	
Russia	Ulan-Ude	Baikal International Airport	Passenger	
Russia	Ulyanovsk	Ulyanovsk Baratayevka Airport	Passenger	
Russia	Uray	Uray Airport	Terminated	
Russia	Vladikavkaz	Beslan Airport	Passenger	
Russia	Vladivostok	Vladivostok International Airport	Passenger	
Russia	Volgograd	Volgograd International Airport	Passenger	
Russia	Voronezh	Voronezh International Airport	Terminated	
Russia	Yakutsk	Yakutsk Airport	Passenger	
Russia	Yaroslavl	Tunoshna Airport	Passenger	
Russia	Yekaterinburg	Koltsovo International Airport	Passenger	
Russia	Yuzhno-Sakhalinsk	Yuzhno-Sakhalinsk Airport	Passenger	
Rwanda	Kigali	Kigali International Airport	Terminated	
Saudi Arabia	Jeddah	King Abdulaziz International Airport	Terminated	
Senegal	Dakar	Léopold Sédar Senghor International Airport	Terminated	
Serbia	Belgrade	Belgrade Nikola Tesla Airport	Terminated	
Seychelles	Mahé	Seychelles International Airport	Seasonal	
Sierra Leone	Freetown	Lungi International Airport	Terminated	
Singapore	Singapore	Changi Airport	Terminated	
Slovakia	Bratislava	Bratislava Airport	Terminated	
Slovakia	Košice	Košice International Airport	Terminated	
Slovenia	Ljubljana	Ljubljana Jože Pučnik Airport	Terminated	
South Africa	Johannesburg	O. R. Tambo International Airport	Terminated	
Spain	Alicante	Alicante–Elche Miguel Hernández Airport	Terminated	
Spain	Barcelona	Josep Tarradellas Barcelona–El Prat Airport	Terminated	
Spain	Madrid	Madrid–Barajas Airport	Terminated	
Spain	Málaga	Málaga Airport	Terminated	
Spain	Palma de Mallorca	Palma de Mallorca Airport	Terminated	
Spain	Tenerife	Tenerife South Airport	Terminated	
Spain	Valencia	Valencia Airport	Terminated	
Sri Lanka	Colombo	Bandaranaike International Airport	Seasonal	
Sudan	Khartoum	Khartoum International Airport	Terminated	
Sweden	Gothenburg	Göteborg Landvetter Airport	Terminated	
Sweden	Luleå	Luleå Airport	Terminated	
Sweden	Stockholm	Stockholm Arlanda Airport	Terminated	
Switzerland	Geneva	Geneva Airport	Terminated	
Switzerland	Zurich	Zurich Airport	Terminated	
Switzerland	Basel	EuroAirport Basel Mulhouse Freiburg	Terminated	
France	Mulhouse	EuroAirport Basel Mulhouse Freiburg	Terminated	
Germany	Freiburg	EuroAirport Basel Mulhouse Freiburg	Terminated	
Syria	Aleppo	Aleppo International Airport	Terminated	
Syria	Damascus	Damascus International Airport	Terminated	
Tajikistan	Dushanbe	Dushanbe International Airport	Terminated	
Tanzania	Dar es Salaam	Julius Nyerere International Airport	Terminated	
Thailand	Bangkok	Suvarnabhumi Airport	Passenger	
Thailand	Phuket	Phuket International Airport	Passenger	
Togo	Lomé	Lomé–Tokoin International Airport	Terminated	
Tunisia	Monastir	Monastir Habib Bourguiba International Airport	Terminated	
Tunisia	Tunis	Tunis–Carthage International Airport	Terminated	
Turkmenistan	Ashgabat	Ashgabat International Airport	Terminated	
Turkey	Ankara	Esenboğa International Airport	Terminated	
Turkey	Antalya	Antalya Airport	Passenger	
Turkey	Istanbul	Atatürk Airport	Airport Closed	
Turkey	Istanbul	Istanbul Airport	Passenger	
Uganda	Entebbe	Entebbe International Airport	Terminated	
Ukraine	Dnipro	Dnipro International Airport	Terminated	
Ukraine	Donetsk	Donetsk International Airport	Terminated	
Ukraine	Kyiv	Boryspil International Airport	Terminated	
Ukraine	Lviv	Lviv Danylo Halytskyi International Airport	Terminated	
Ukraine	Zaporizhzhia	Zaporizhzhia International Airport	Terminated	
Ukraine	Simferopol (Note: Disputed. See Annexation of Crimea by the Russian Federation.)	Simferopol International Airport	Terminated	
United Arab Emirates	Abu Dhabi	Zayed International Airport	Passenger	
United Arab Emirates	Dubai	Al Maktoum International Airport	Terminated	
United Arab Emirates	Dubai	Dubai International Airport	Passenger	
United Arab Emirates	Sharjah	Sharjah International Airport	Terminated	
United Kingdom	London	Gatwick Airport	Terminated	
United Kingdom	London	Heathrow Airport	Terminated	
United States	Anchorage	Ted Stevens Anchorage International Airport	Terminated	
United States	Chicago	O'Hare International Airport	Terminated	
United States	Los Angeles	Los Angeles International Airport	Terminated	
United States	Miami	Miami International Airport	Terminated	
United States	New York City	John F. Kennedy International Airport	Terminated	
United States	San Francisco	San Francisco International Airport	Terminated	
United States	Seattle	Seattle–Tacoma International Airport	Terminated	
United States	Washington, D.C.	Dulles International Airport	Terminated	
Uruguay	Montevideo	Carrasco International Airport	Terminated	
Uzbekistan	Bukhara	Bukhara International Airport	Passenger	
Uzbekistan	Fergana	Fergana International Airport	Terminated	
Uzbekistan	Samarkand	Samarkand International Airport	Passenger	
Vietnam	Ho Chi Minh City	Tan Son Nhat International Airport	Passenger	
Vietnam	Nha Trang	Cam Ranh International Airport	Passenger	
Vietnam	Phu Quoc	Phu Quoc International Airport	Passenger	
Yemen	Aden	Aden International Airport	Terminated	
Yemen	Sanaa	Sanaa International Airport	Terminated	
Zambia	Lusaka	Kenneth Kaunda International Airport	Terminated	
Zimbabwe	Harare	Robert Gabriel Mugabe International Airport	Terminated	
