= SkyBus International Airlines =

Charter airline in Kazakhstan (2008–2017)

IATA	ICAO	Call sign
BYK	7S	SUMKO
- Founded: 2008
- Ceased operations: 2017
- Focus cities: Batumi
- Fleet size: 2
- Destinations: 9
- Headquarters: Almaty, Kazakhstan
- Website: www.skybus.kz

SkyBus International Airlines was a charter airline in Kazakhstan. SkyBus was founded in 2008.

== Destinations ==
SkyBus destinations included (as of May 2016):

Georgia

- Batumi - Alexander Kartveli Batumi International Airport
- Tbilisi - Shota Rustaveli International Airport

Kazakhstan

- Aktau - Aktau Airport
- Aktobe - Aktobe Airport
- Astana - Astana International Airport
- Atyrau - Atyrau Airport
- Karagandy - Sary-Arka Airport
- Kostanay - Kostanay Airport
- Kyzylorda - Kyzylorda Airport
- Shymkent - Shymkent International Airport

== Fleet ==
The SkyBus fleet consisted of the following aircraft (as of August 2017):

SkyBus fleet
Aircraft	In fleet	Orders	C	Y
Bombardier CRJ100ER	2	-		
