= Aeroflot Flight 1080 =

1978 aviation accident

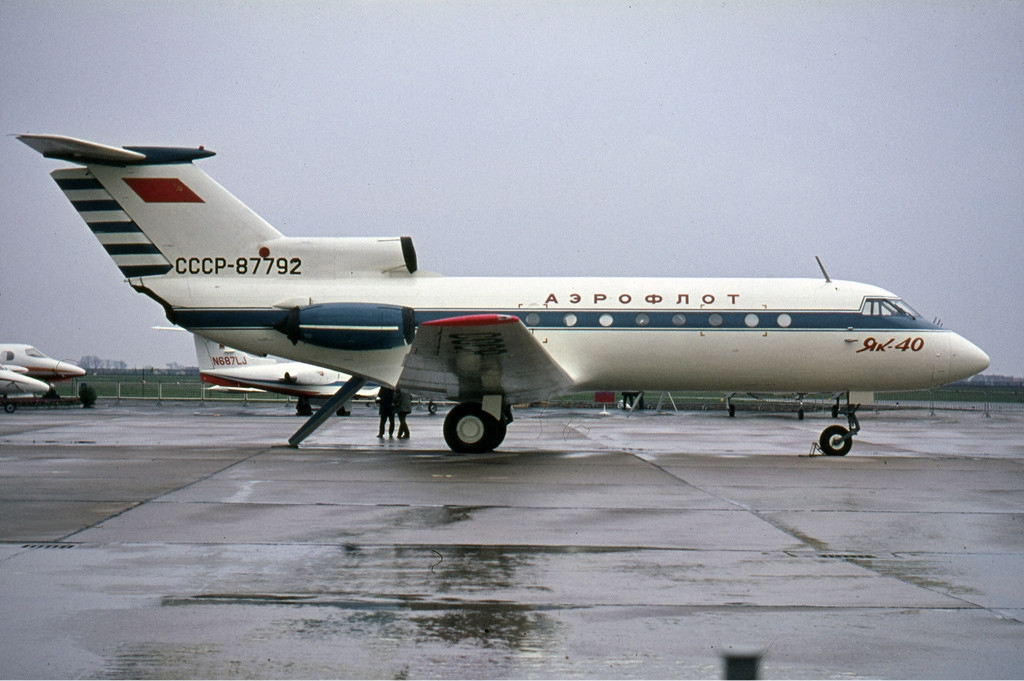
- An Aeroflot Yakovlev Yak-40, similar to the one involved in the crash

Accident
- Date: 7 October 1978
- Summary: Overloading, engine failure after takeoff
- Site: 7.5 km southwest of Sverdlovsk-Koltsovo Airport

Aircraft
- Aircraft type: Yakovlev Yak-40
- Operator: Aeroflot
- Registration: CCCP-87437
- Flight origin: Sverdlovsk-Koltsovo Airport, Sverdlovsk
- Stopover: Kostanay-Narimanovka Airport, Kostanay
- Destination: Taraz Airport, Dzhambul
- Occupants: 38
- Passengers: 34
- Crew: 4
- Fatalities: 38
- Survivors: 0

Aeroflot Flight 1080 was a Soviet domestic passenger flight from Sverdlovsk (now Yekaterinburg), Russia, to Dzhambul (now Taraz), Kazakhstan, that crashed at night shortly after takeoff on 7 October 1978. All 38 passengers and crew were killed in the crash which occurred when one of the engines failed due to icing during initial climb out. At the time, the crash was the second worst in the history of the Yakovlev Yak-40, which had entered operational service with Aeroflot just ten years prior.

== Aircraft and flight ==
The Yak-40 involved in the accident, registration CCCP-87437, had entered service on 31 July 1974 and had just shy of 6,300 operating hours on the airframe at the time of the accident. Flight 1080 was being operated by the Kazakh Civil Aviation Administration under Aeroflot. It had 34 passengers, which included four children, and four crew on board during the flight of 7 October 1978. The crew consisted of two pilots, a flight mechanic, and a stewardess. It was flying a domestic route from Sverdlovsk-Koltsovo Airport in Yekaterinburg, Russia, to Kostanay Airport in northern Kazakhstan. On the night of the accident, the sky was cloudy and there were light rainy conditions in addition to an air temperature of 5 °C.

== Accident ==
At 19:48 YEKT on 7 October 1978, Aeroflot Flight 1080 commenced its takeoff roll on runway 26 at Sverdlovsk-Koltsovo Airport. Due to the presence of a crosswind and the fact that the aircraft was overloaded, it took off at a speed of 205 km/h (111 kn). At 19:50, the crew reported to air traffic control that its left engine had failed.

Just one hundred meters off the ground, the aircraft began turning to the left. At 19:51, controllers observed a flash and a fire on a forested hillside close to the airport. The aircraft had struck trees while it was still 23 meters (75 ft) in the air and hit the ground shortly after, destroying the airframe and detaching the flight's tail and rear stabilizers. All 38 people aboard Flight 1080 were killed in the catastrophe.

== Investigation ==
The Soviet State Research Institute of Civil Aviation accident commission determined the crash to be the fault of the crew. The aircraft was loaded beyond its specified limits, consequently requiring additional thrust on takeoff. The crew failed to take into account icing conditions which were present at the time of the accident. All three engines had been affected by a buildup of ice. The left engine failed shortly after takeoff and the right and middle produced insufficient levels of power. The commission also cited air traffic control's failure to point out nearby terrain after giving the aircraft clearance to turn left after takeoff at an altitude of just one hundred meters as a contributing factor to the accident.
