= Skybus =

Skybus may refer to:

== Airlines ==
- Skybus Airlines, a former American airline
- SkyBus International Airlines, a Kazakh charter airline
- Skybus (Aqua Avia), a proposed privately owned airline in New Zealand during the 1970s
- Isles of Scilly Skybus, a British airline

== Other transport ==
- Skybus Metro, a defunct rapid transit proposal in India
- SkyBus (airport bus), an airport bus service in Melbourne, Hobart and Gold Coast (Australia) and Auckland (New Zealand)
- Sky Bus Transport System, intercity buses in Ethiopia
- Transit Expressway Revenue Line, commonly known as "Skybus", a proposed people mover system in Pittsburgh, Pennsylvania

== See also ==
- Airbus
