= Uate =

Uate may refer to:

- UATE, ICAO code for Aktau International Airport in Kazakhstan
- Akuila Uate (born 1987), Australian rugby league footballer
