= PWQ =

PWQ may refer to:

- Psychology of Women Quarterly, a quarterly peer-reviewed academic journal focusing on the psychological health of women
- PWQ, the IATA code for Pavlodar Airport, Kazakhstan

Pwiqw senlla.
