= Zhetysu (airline) =

Airline of Kazakhstan

Jetısu
IATA	ICAO	Call sign
—	JTU	JETYSU
- Founded: 1994; 32 years ago
- Hubs: Taldykorgan Airport
- Focus cities: Usharal Airport
- Fleet size: 5
- Destinations: 2
- Headquarters: Taldykorgan, Kazakhstan
- Website: www.zhetysuavia.kz

Zhetysu (Kazakh: Жетісу / Jetısu [ʒʲetɘˈsɘw]) is a Kazakh airline, based at Taldykorgan Airport.

== Activity ==
Between January and July 2009, the airline served 8,671 passengers and performed 181 flights. The coefficient of utilization of passenger seats was 68%. In 2006 airline served 15,261 passengers. The airline operates only one daily route from Taldykorgan to Usharal. The airline also operated a route from Taldykorgan to Almaty, but due to unprofitability, the management decided to close the route. As of December 11, 2013 the Taldykorgan-Almaty route was reopened due to reconstruction of a highway.

== Fleet ==
The airline consists the following aircraft:

Jetısu fleet
Aircraft	Number	Orders	Passengers	Notes
Yakovlev Yak-40	3	0	30	
Let L-410 Turbolet	2	0	19	
