= Arkalyk Airport =

Airport in Arkalyk, Kazakhstan

Arkalyk
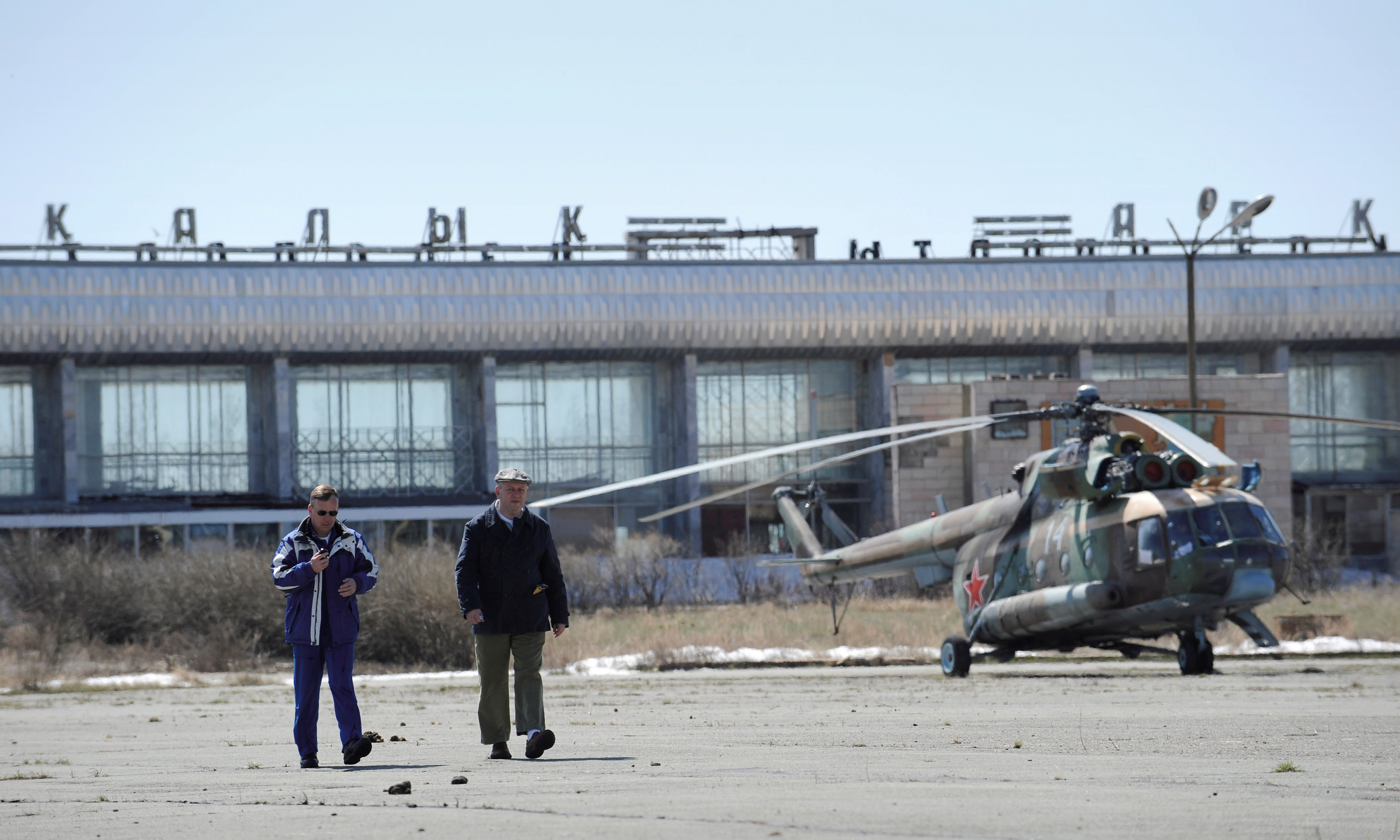
- IATA: AYK; ICAO: UAUR

Summary
- Airport type: Public
- Location: Arkalyk
- Elevation AMSL: 388 m (1,273 ft)
- Coordinates: 50°19′30″N 066°57′36″E

Maps
- Location in Kazakhstan
- Interactive map of Arkalyk

Runways
| Direction | Length | | Surface |
| Direction | m | ft | Surface |
|---|---|---|---|
| 08/26 | 2,500 | 8,202 | Asphalt |

Arkalyk Airport (also given as Arkalyk North) (IATA: AYK, ICAO: UAUR) is an airport in Kazakhstan located 9 km (5.6 mi) north of Arkalyk. It is a small civilian airport built during the Soviet era, and has a sizeable asphalt apron and passenger terminal. The facility is used by the Russian space agency to base and refuel helicopters used in the recovery of returning Soyuz missions. Construction of a new terminal began in 2025 and completed in 2026. It may also see private use. Commercial service returned to the airport in August 2026 after 33 years.

== Airlines and destinations ==
| Airlines | Destinations |
|---|---|
| SCAT Airlines | Almaty, Astana, Kostanay |
