= Zaisan Airport =

Airport in Kazakhstan

Zaisan Airport Zaisan Äuejaiy (Kazakh)
- IATA: SZI; ICAO: UASZ

Summary
- Airport type: Public
- Owner/Operator: JSC “Ust-Kamenogorsk Airport”
- Serves: Zaisan, Kazakhstan
- Location: 1 km (0.62 mi) N of Zaisan City
- Elevation AMSL: 579 m / 1,900 ft
- Coordinates: 47°29′13″N 084°53′17″E

Maps
- Location in Kazakhstan
- Interactive map of Zaisan Airport

Runways
Direction	Length		Surface
Direction	m	ft	Surface
09/27	1,505	4,938	Concrete
- Source: AIP Kazakhstan

Zaisan Airport (Kazakh: Зайсан Әуежайы / Zaisan Äuejaiy, IATA: SZI, ICAO: UASZ) is classified as a national aerodrome in the latest AIP. The length of runway is 1,505 m × 35 m (4,938 ft × 115 ft).

== Airlines and destinations ==
Airlines	Destinations
SCAT Airlines	Öskemen
