= Semey Airport =

Airport in Kazakhstan

Semei International Airport Semei Halyqaralyq Äuejaiy (Kazakh)
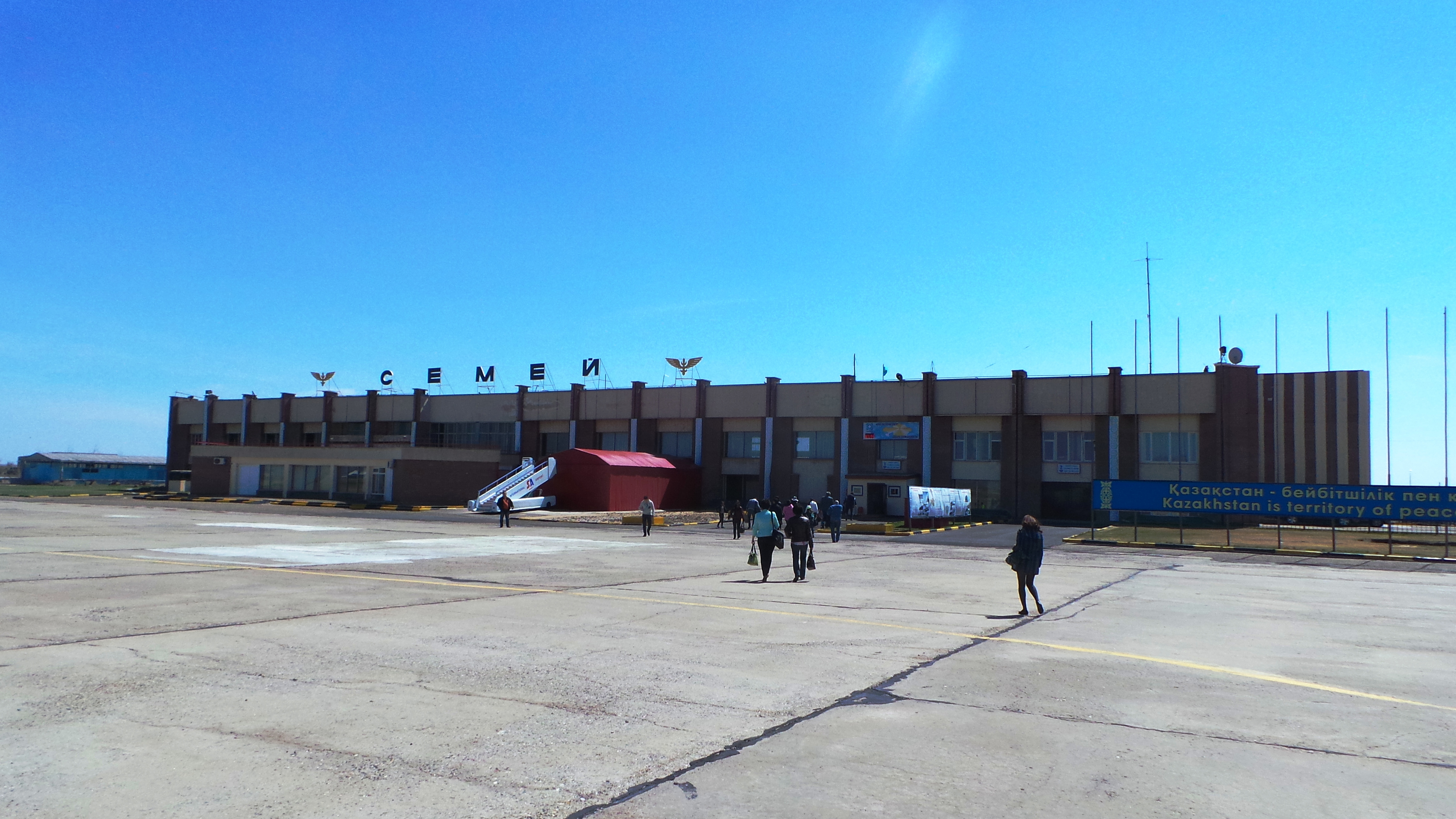
- IATA: PLX; ICAO: UASS

Summary
- Airport type: Public
- Operator: JSC "Semei International Airport"
- Serves: Semei
- Location: 10 km (6.2 mi) SW of Semei
- Elevation AMSL: 232 m (761 ft)
- Coordinates: 50°21′05″N 080°14′04″E
- Website: abaiairport.kz

Maps
- Location in Kazakhstan
- Interactive map of Semei International Airport

Runways
Direction	Length		Surface
Direction	m	ft	Surface
08/26	3,096	10,157	Concrete

Statistics
- Passengers: 49,900
- Source: AIP Kazakhstan

Semei International Airport (Kazakh: Semei Halyqaralyq Äuejaiy) (IATA: PLX, ICAO: UASS), formerly New Semei (Kazakh: Jañasemei) and named after Abai Qunanbaiuly, is an airport in Semei, Kazakhstan, located 10 km (6.2 mi) south-west of the city. It services large airliners. The airfield contains two groups of alert fighter pads. A 400 m (1,300 ft) overrun exists at each end of runway 08/26.

Established in 1929, it is Kazakhstan's oldest international airport.

In 1960, the 356th Fighter Aviation Regiment PVO of the Soviet Air Defence Forces arrived at the base from Irkutsk. Equipped with MiG-17s and Yak-25s, it was placed under the 33rd Air Defence Division, 14th Independent Air Defence Army. It was later equipped with both the Tupolev Tu-128 and MiG-31.

Declassified CIA documents indicate that in the late 1960s, during the height of the Sino-Soviet split, the Soviet Union used this airfield as a bomber staging base for Chinese targets, and at times the Tupolev Tu-22 Blinder was identified here.

== Airlines and destinations ==
Airlines	Destinations
FlyArystan	Almaty, Astana, Şymkent
SCAT Airlines	Qarağandy, Ürjar
Vietjet Qazaqstan	Astana

== See also ==
- Transport in Kazakhstan
- List of the busiest airports in the former USSR
