= Taldykorgan Airport =

Airport in Kazakhstan

- IATA: TDK; ICAO: UAAT

Summary
- Airport type: Public/Military
- Owner/Operator: JSC “Zhetysu Aircompany”
- Serves: Taldykorgan Kazakhstan
- Location: 12 km (7.5 mi) NE of Taldykorgan City
- Elevation AMSL: 592.5 m / 1,944 ft
- Coordinates: 45°07′21″N 078°26′34″E

Maps
- Location in Kazakhstan
- Interactive map of Taldykorgan Airport

Runways
Direction	Length		Surface
Direction	m	ft	Surface
02/20	3,001	9,846	Concrete
- Source: AIP Kazakhstan

Taldykorgan Airport is classified as a national aerodrome in the latest AIP. It has a single runway with a length of 3,001 m × 50 m (9,846 ft × 164 ft).

The Airport houses the 604th Air Base of the Armed Forces of the Republic of Kazakhstan, one of four fast jet facilities in the country operating mainly MiG-27s and Su-27s (previously the 129th Fighter-Bomber Regiment).

== Airlines and destinations ==
Airlines	Destinations
Qazaq Air	Astana, Türkistan
SCAT Airlines	Astana
Zhetysu	Seasonal: Üşaral
