= Usharal Airport =

Airport in Alakol, Kazakhstan

- IATA: USJ; ICAO: UAAL

Summary
- Airport type: Public
- Serves: Usharal, Kazakhstan
- Coordinates: 46°11′25″N 080°49′53″E

Maps
- Location in Kazakhstan
- Interactive map of Usharal Airport

Runways
Direction	Length		Surface
Direction	m	ft	Surface
10/28	2,200	7,218	asphalt
- Source: AIP

Usharal Airport (IATA: USJ, ICAO: UAAL) is a domestic aerodrome serving Usharal, the capital of the Alakol District, in the south-eastern Almaty Region of Kazakhstan.

== Airlines and destinations ==
Airlines	Destinations
Qazaq Air	Seasonal: Astana
Zhetysu	Seasonal: Taldyqorğan
