= Petropavl Airport (Kazakhstan) =

Airport in Kazakhstan

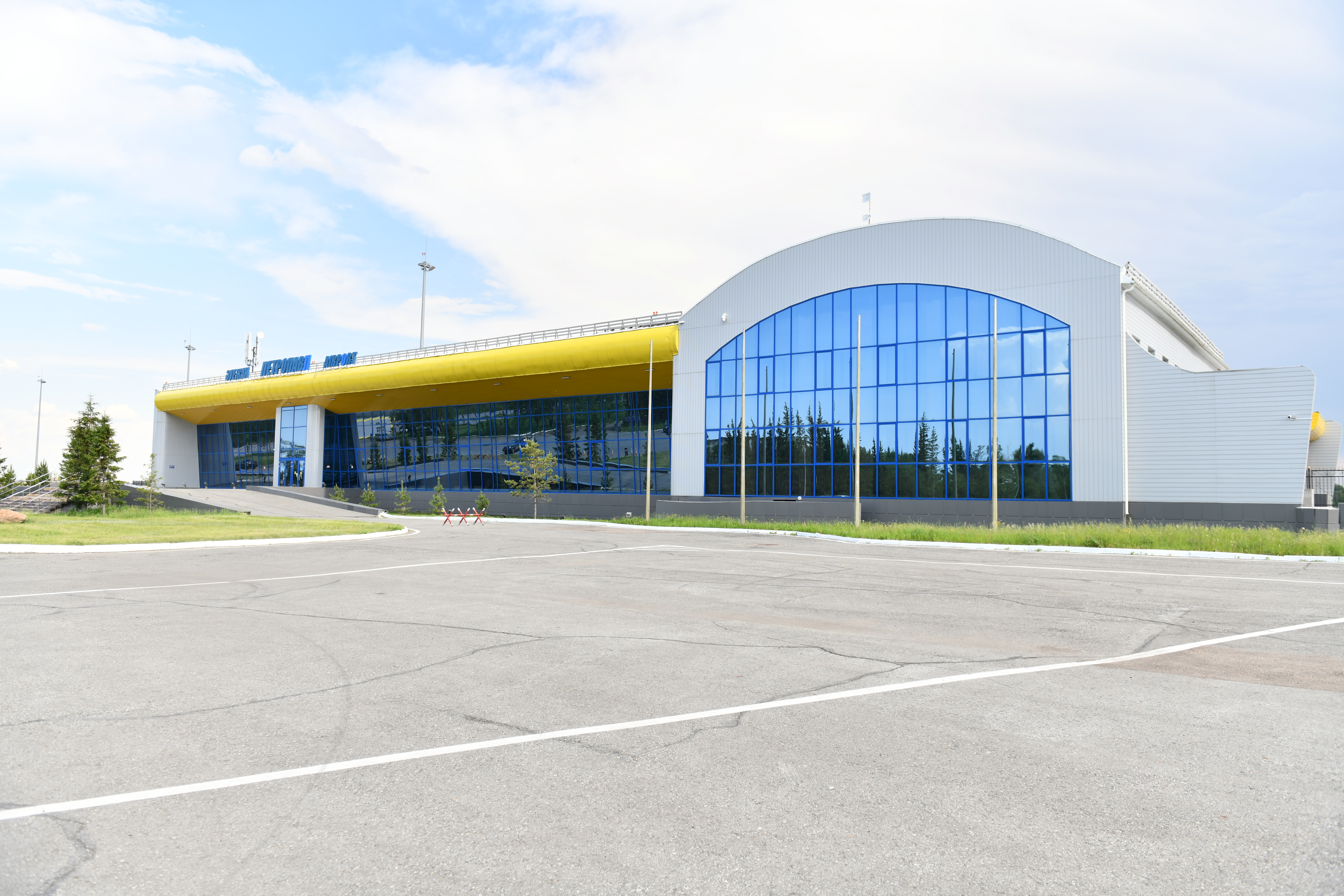
- IATA: PPK; ICAO: UACP

Summary
- Airport type: Public
- Owner: JSC "Airport Management Group"
- Operator: JSC "Petropavlovsk International Airport"
- Serves: North Kazakhstan Region
- Location: 11 km (6.8 mi) SE of Petropavl
- Elevation AMSL: 139.6 m / 458 ft
- Coordinates: 54°46′28″N 069°11′06″E

Maps
- Location in Kazakhstan
- Interactive map of Petropavl Airport

Runways
Direction	Length		Surface
Direction	m	ft	Surface
05/23	2,802	9,193	Asphalt/Concrete

Statistics
- Passengers: 18,500
- Source: AIP Kazakhstan

Petropavl International Airport (formerly known as Petropavlovsk South) (IATA: PPK, ICAO: UACP) is an airport in Kazakhstan located 11 km (6.8 mi) south of Petropavlovsk. It handles medium-sized airliners and is the northernmost airport in Kazakhstan. Currently, there are flights from Petropavlovsk Airport to Almaty, Astana and Shymkent.

== Airlines and destinations ==
The following airlines operate regular scheduled services to and from Petropavlovsk:

Airlines	Destinations
Qazaq Air	Astana
SCAT Airlines	Almaty, Şymkent; Seasonal charter: Sharm El Sheikh

== See also ==
- List of airports in Kazakhstan
- Kokshetau Airport (located in Akmola Region 195 km (121 mi) from Petropavl)
