= Pavlodar Airport =

Airport in Kazakhstan

Pavlodar Airport Pavlodar Halyqaralyq Äuejaiy (Kazakh)

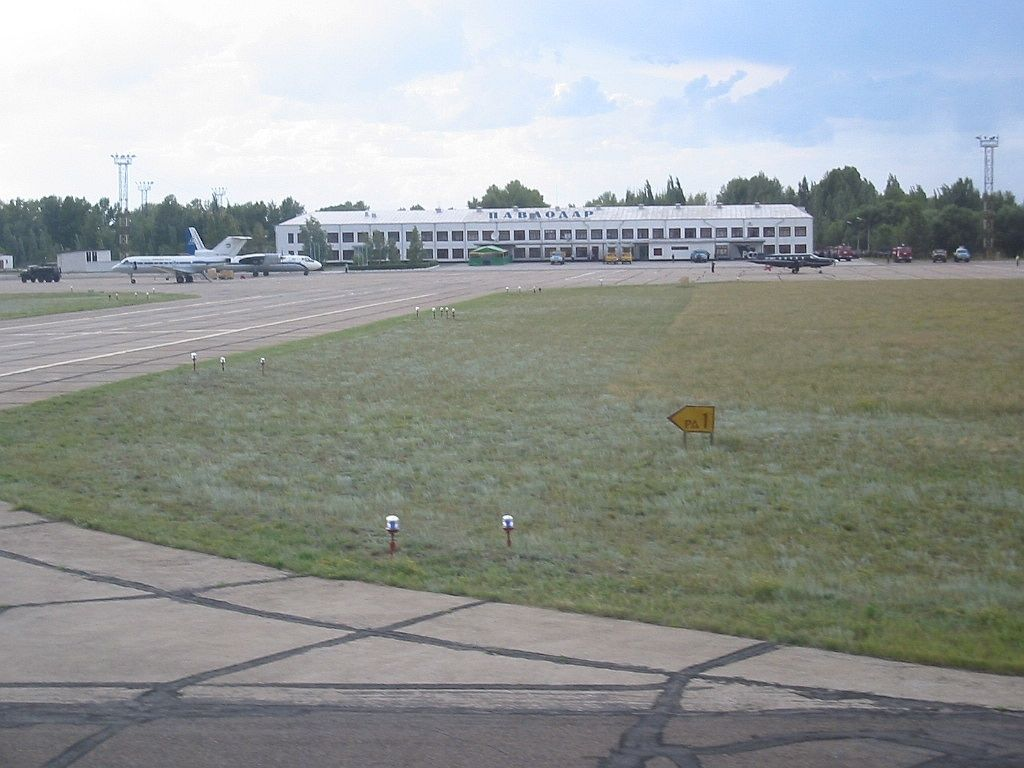
- IATA: PWQ; ICAO: UASP

Summary
- Airport type: Public
- Owner: Samruk-Kazyna Holding
- Operator: JSC Pavlodar Airport
- Location: Pavlodar
- Elevation AMSL: 125.2 m (411 ft)
- Coordinates: 52°11′42″N 077°04′26″E
- Website: pavlodar.aeroport.website

Maps
- Location in Kazakhstan
- Interactive map of Pavlodar Airport

Runways
Direction	Length		Surface
Direction	m	ft	Surface
03/21	2,500	8,202	Concrete
- Source: AIP Kazakhstan

Pavlodar International Airport (Kazakh: Pavlodar Halyqaralyq Äuejaiy), also colloquially known as Pavlodar South (IATA: PWQ, ICAO: UASP), is an airport in Kazakhstan located 8 km (5.0 mi) southeast of Pavlodar. It services medium-sized airliners.

== History ==
Until 1999, The airport was part of Irtysh Avia airline. Since 2000, it was under control of Pavlodar oblast akimat, and in 2006, it was transferred to Samruk-Kazyna holding.

The airport was renovated and was awarded an ICAO category I certificate in 2006.

== Reconstruction (2025–2026) ==
On 1 April 2025, Pavlodar Airport was closed for a major reconstruction project.

The project includes widening the runway from 45 metres (148 ft) to 60 metres (197 ft), reconstruction of the runway pavement, renewal of the taxiway and apron pavements, modernization of the airport's power supply system, installation of new airfield lighting equipment, and deployment of a perimeter video surveillance system.

The reconstruction also includes the construction of a 17.5-kilometre (10.9 mi) perimeter fence.

The project is intended to bring the airport into compliance with ICAO standards and enable the operation of modern aircraft without takeoff-weight restrictions.

Construction is expected to be completed in July 2026, with the airport scheduled to reopen in August 2026.

== Airlines and destinations ==
Airlines	Destinations
FlyArystan	Almaty
SCAT Airlines	Astana

== See also ==
- Transport in Kazakhstan
- List of the busiest airports in the former USSR
