= Atyrau Airport =

Airport in Kazakhstan

Atyrau International Airport Атырау Халықаралық Əуежайы

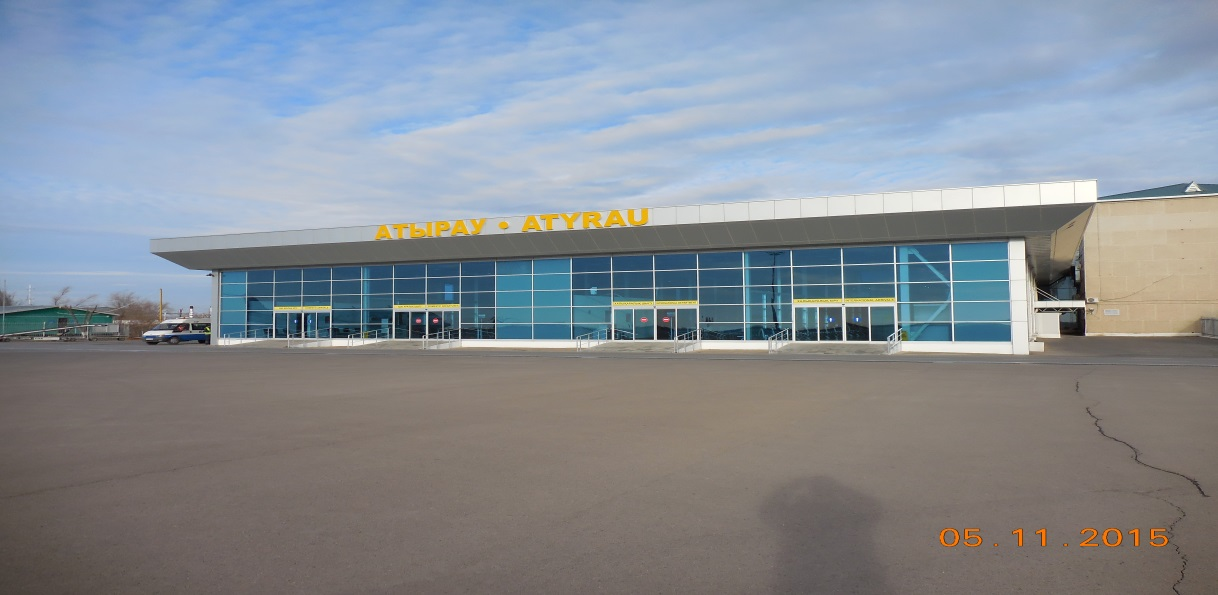
- IATA: GUW; ICAO: UATG

Summary
- Operator: ATMA - Atyrau International Airport
- Serves: Atyrau
- Location: 8 km NW of Atyrau Railway Station, Kazakhstan
- Focus city for: Air Astana; SCAT Airlines; FlyArystan
- Elevation AMSL: −22 m (−72 ft)
- Coordinates: 47°07′19″N 051°49′17″E
- Website: guw.aero

Maps
- Location in Kazakhstan Location in Europe GUW (North Atlantic)
- Interactive map of Atyrau International Airport

Runways
Direction	Length		Surface
Direction	m	ft	Surface
14/32	3,000	9,843	Asphalt/concrete
- Source: AIP Kazakhstan

ATMA Atyrau Airport (Kazakh: Atyrau Halyqaralyq Äuejaiy) (IATA: GUW, ICAO: UATG) is an airport located 8 km (5.0 mi) northwest of Atyrau, Kazakhstan. It is the lowest international commercial airport in the world at 22 m (72 ft) below sea level.

== History ==
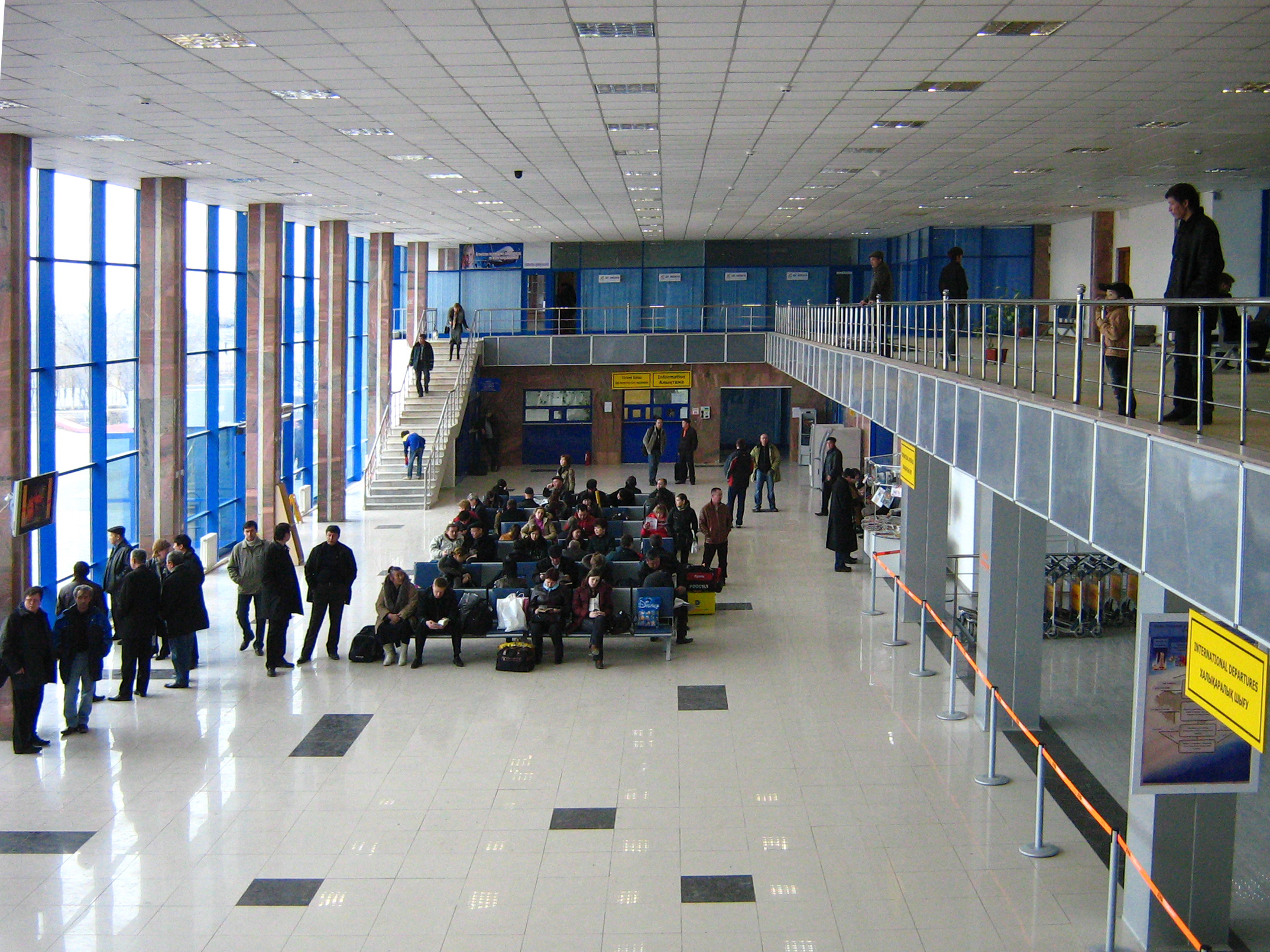
Check-in hall

ATMA obtained the operational rights of ATMA Atyrau Airport when the airport was privatized as a build and operate model in 1994. ATMA is a joint company between Mağdenli Yer Hizmetleri and Atyrau Regional Administration with both parties having a 50% share. It is the only airport in Atyrau and one of the thirteen international airports in Kazakhstan.

The region is crucial for Kazakhstan's economy as it is very close to oil exploration sites and platforms on the Caspian Sea. The city is the base town for many oil and construction companies.

In 2007, ATMA completed the construction of the new terminal building and a new longer runway. Enclosing a total area of 2,000 m^{2} (22,000 sq ft), the new terminal can serve 600 passengers per hour. Passengers can also benefit from the modernized CIP and VIP lounges. There is Wi-Fi internet access all over the terminal including CIP and VIP lounges. As a result of the renovation project, conveyor belt system is installed in both international and domestic arrival terminals and computerized check in banks became operational for easier passenger ticket processing. Boarding is done by transporting passengers by bus from the terminal to the plane.

In 2019, it was the 5th busiest airport in Kazakhstan, as 937,032 passengers passed through the airport.

== Airlines and destinations ==
Airlines	Destinations
Aeroflot	Moscow–Sheremetyevo
Air Astana	Almaty, Amsterdam, Astana, Baku, Dubai–International (suspended until 31 August 2026), Istanbul; Seasonal: Tbilisi
Air Cairo	Sharm El Sheikh
Azerbaijan Airlines	Baku
azimuth	Sochi
Centrum Air	Nukus
FlyArystan	Almaty, Aqtau, Astana, Kutaisi, Şymkent, Seasonal: Batumi
flydubai	Dubai-International (begins 18 December 2026)
Neos	Milan–Malpensa
Pegasus Airlines	Istanbul–Sabiha Gökçen
Qazaq Air	Aqtöbe, Oral
SCAT Airlines	Almaty, Astana, Şymkent, Taraz
Uzbekistan Airways	Nukus (begins 22 November 2026), Tashkent

== See also ==
- List of airports in Kazakhstan
- List of the busiest airports in the former USSR
- Extreme points of Earth – Lowest attainable by transportation
- List of places on land with elevations below sea level
