= Taraz Airport =

Airport in Kazakhstan

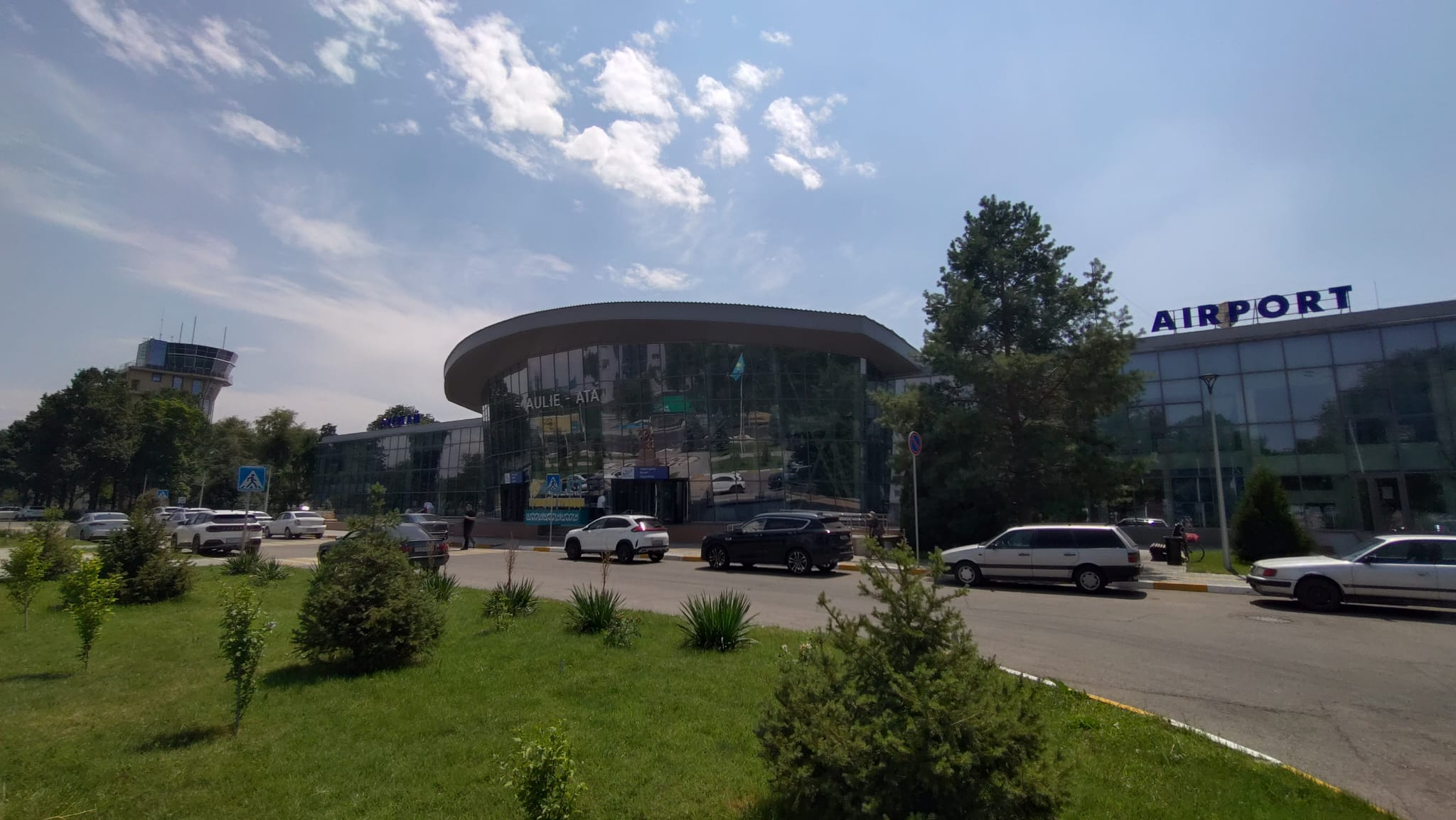
- IATA: DMB; ICAO: UADD

Summary
- Airport type: Public
- Operator: "Aulie-ata International Airport"
- Serves: Taraz, Kazakhstan
- Location: 8.5 km (5.3 mi) SW of Taraz
- Elevation AMSL: 666 m (2,185 ft)
- Coordinates: 42°51′13″N 071°18′13″E
- Website: dmb.aero

Maps
- Location in Kazakhstan
- Interactive map of Taraz Airport

Runways
Direction	Length		Surface
Direction	m	ft	Surface
13/31	3,500	11,483	Asphalt

Statistics
- Passengers: 43,700
- Source: AIP Kazakhstan

Taraz Airport (IATA: DMB, ICAO: UADD), also known as Jambyl Airport, is an airport serving Taraz (formerly Jambyl and Aulie-Ata), a city in the Jambyl Province of Kazakhstan.

== Airlines and destinations ==
Airlines	Destinations
SCAT Airlines	Almaty, Astana, Atyrau; Seasonal charter: Novosibirsk, Phu Quoc, Sharm El Sheikh, Sihanoukville
