= Kyzylorda Airport =

Airport in Kazakhstan

- IATA: KZO; ICAO: UAOO

Summary
- Airport type: Public
- Operator: JSC "Airport Korkyt Ata"
- Serves: Kyzylorda, Kazakhstan
- Elevation AMSL: 131 m (430 ft)
- Coordinates: 44°42′25″N 065°35′33″E
- Website: https://airportkzo.kz/

Maps
- Location in Kazakhstan
- Interactive map of Kyzylorda Airport

Runways
Direction	Length		Surface
Direction	m	ft	Surface
06/24	2,700	8,858	Asphalt
- Source: AIP Kazakhstan

Kyzylorda Airport and officially Korkyt Ata International Airport (IATA: KZO, ICAO: UAOO) is an international airport located 12.5 km (7.8 mi) southeast of Kyzylorda (formerly known as Kzyl-Orda), the capital city of the Kyzylorda Region in Kazakhstan. The airport is named after Turkic poet and songwriter Gorkut Ata.

== History ==
The Kyzylorda Airport has been located at its current site since 1988, with construction starting in 1986. Previously, the airport was located within the city limits. Today, the terminal building houses the city's bus station. The first flight from Almaty, operated by a Tupolev Tu-154, landed at the new airport in 1988.

Until the mid-1990s, the airport in Kyzylorda was home to a large number of Antonov An-2 aircraft (over 50). These planes operated regular passenger and mail flights to various settlements in the region, as well as conducting aviation work. The airport also had 7 Yakovlev Yak-40 aircraft and 3 Mil Mi-8 helicopters.

In 2001, a new terminal complex with a capacity of 150 passengers per hour was built at the airport. In the same year, the airport operator, the open joint-stock company Kyzylorda Airport was named after Korkyt Ata.

From the late 1990s until 2011, the Kyzylorda airfield accepted Class 3 aircraft (Antonov An-24, Yakovlev Yak-40) and progressively lighter aircraft, as well as helicopters of all types. The airfield could occasionally accommodate Class 2 aircraft (Tupolev Tu-154, Tu-134, Yakovlev Yak-42) upon prior request.

In April 2011, the reconstruction of the airfield was completed, including the replacement of radio navigation, lighting, and meteorological equipment, as well as the major overhaul of taxiways and the runway. These improvements expanded the range of aircraft types that the airfield could accommodate.

Since November 3, 2014, the Kyzylorda airport has been authorized to handle international flights.

From April 2015 to February 2016, due to the reconstruction of the Baikonur airfield’s runway, the Russian airline Alrosa operated a flight from Moscow (Domodedovo) to Kyzylorda.

From May to October 2015, the airline Transaero operated a regular flight three times a week between Moscow (Vnukovo) and Kyzylorda.

=== New building (2024) ===
Construction of the new airport began in March 2023.

On November 12, 2024, Kazakh Prime Minister Olzhas Bektanov attended the opening of the new terminal at Korkyt Ata Airport in Kyzylorda. The terminal, built under corporate social responsibility initiatives, will increase the airport's capacity from 300,000 to 2 million passengers annually. It meets international standards set by IATA and ICAO.

The project, funded with 20.9 billion tenge from the Bulat Utemuratov Fund and 4.3 billion tenge from the local budget, includes advanced technologies like telescopic boarding bridges and automated baggage inspection. The airport has seen a 20% increase in passenger traffic in 2023, with new domestic and international routes planned. Local officials praised the terminal’s impact on regional development.

From July 15, 2018, Aeroflot operated regular flight between Moscow (Sheremetyevo) and Kyzylorda four times a week. This service continued until October 26, 2019. After that, direct flights to Moscow were available only through the nearby airports of Aktobe and Shymkent. The suspension was due to terminal repairs at Kyzylorda Airport from November 2019 to March 2020, during which the airport only handled domestic flights.

== Facilities ==
The airport resides at an elevation of 131 m (430 ft) above mean sea level. It has one runway which measures 2,700 m × 45 m (8,858 ft × 148 ft).

The new airport covers an area of 7,500 square meters. The terminal features 8 check-in counters, 5 self-check-in stations, 7 security checkpoints, and 10 passport control booths. The first floor includes offices for government agencies, a medical center, a spacious waiting area, a food court, a Duty Free zone, and a café. Additionally, there is a lounge for transfer passengers. A mother and child room is provided, and luggage can be stored in a secure, designated area. This floor also features prayer rooms.

The second floor of the terminal features waiting areas and a CIP lounge. It also includes private restrooms and a food court with a Duty Free zone. From the second floor, passengers can directly board the aircraft via specialized telescopic boarding bridges.

== Airlines and destinations ==
Airlines	Destinations
Air Astana	Almaty
FlyArystan	Almaty, Astana
Vietjet Qazaqstan	Almaty, Astana
