= Kostanay Airport =

Airport in Kazakhstan

Kostanay International Airport Qostanai Halyqaralyq Äuejaiy (Kazakh)
- IATA: KSN; ICAO: UAUU

Summary
- Airport type: Public
- Operator: JSC "Kostanay International Airport"
- Serves: Kostanay
- Location: Kostanay, Kazakhstan
- Elevation AMSL: 183 m (600 ft)
- Coordinates: 53°12′25″N 063°33′01″E

Maps
- Location of airport in Kazakhstan
- Interactive map of Kostanay International Airport

Runways
| Direction | Length | | Surface |
| Direction | m | ft | Surface |
|---|---|---|---|
| 15/33 | 2,514 | 8,248 | Asphalt/concrete |
- Source: AIP Kazakhstan

Kostanay Airport (Kazakh: Qostanai Halyqaralyq Äuejaiy) (IATA: KSN, ICAO: UAUU) is an airport located 2 km (1.2 mi) south-west of Kostanay, Kazakhstan. Runways of the airport were changed over 5 months and the airport was reopened on 10 October 2019. Année runway was built. Since the work has been over, there is only flight to the capital Nur-Sultan. Different companies are planning to fly to international destinations or intern destinations.

In February 1975 the 45th Heavy Bomber Aviation Regiment, 6 TBAK, relocated from Migalovo airfield near Tver to Kostanay, where it was reorganized into the 45th Training Aviation Regiment, Chelyabinsk Higher Military Aviation Red Banner School of Navigators, now the Chelyabinsk Red Banner Military Aviation Institute of Navigators.

On June 28, 2022, by the decree of the Government of Kazakhstan, Kostanay International Airport was named after Akhmet Baitursynuly.

== Airlines and destinations ==
| Airlines | Destinations |
|---|---|
| Aeroflot | Moscow–Sheremetyevo |
| Air Astana | Astana |
| Air Cairo | Seasonal: Sharm El Sheikh |
| Centrum Air | Tashkent |
| FlyArystan | Almaty, Astana |
| SCAT | Shymkent; Seasonal charter: Antalya |
| Vietjet Qazaqstan | Astana, Türkıstan |
