= Aktau International Airport =

Airport in Kazakhstan

Aktau International Airport Халықаралық Ақтау әуежайы

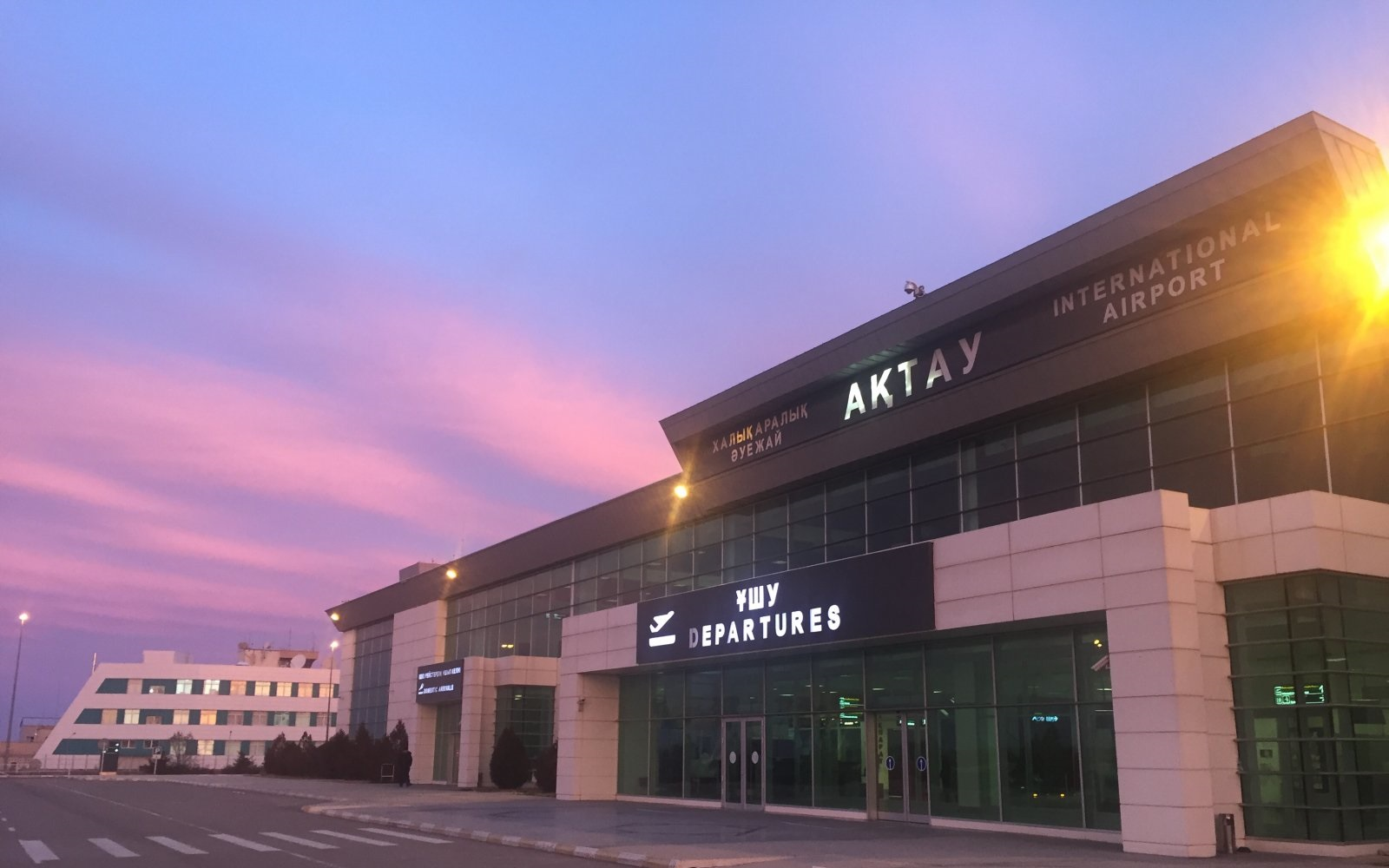
- IATA: SCO; ICAO: UATE

Summary
- Airport type: Public
- Operator: JSC "Aqtau International Airport"
- Serves: Aktau
- Location: Aktau, Kazakhstan
- Opened: 1983; 43 years ago
- Focus city for: SCAT Airlines
- Time zone: AQTT (UTC+05:00)
- Elevation AMSL: 22 m (72 ft)
- Coordinates: 43°51′36″N 051°05′31″E
- Website: www.aktau-airport.kz

Maps
- Location in Kazakhstan SCO (Asia) SCO (West and Central Asia) SCO (North Atlantic)
- Interactive map of Aktau International Airport

Runways
Direction	Length		Surface
Direction	m	ft	Surface
11/29	3,052	10,013	Asphalt

Statistics (2018)
- Passengers: 1,023,900
- Source: AIP Kazakhstan

Aktau International Airport (IATA: SCO, ICAO: UATE) (Kazakh: Халықаралық Ақтау әуежайы, romanized: Halyqaralyq Aqtau äuejaiy), formerly Shevchenko-Central, is an international airport in Mangystau Region, Kazakhstan. It is the primary international airport serving the city of Aktau on the Caspian Sea. The airport is the eighth-busiest international air passenger gateway into Central Asia, the 50th-busiest airport in the post-Soviet states, and the fourth-busiest airport in Kazakhstan.

Aktau International Airport is located 21 km (13 mi) northwest of Aktau. The airport features one passenger terminal and one runway. It serves as a focus city for SCAT Airlines. The airport is served year-round by Aeroflot, Air Astana, SCAT Airlines, Qazaq Air and on a seasonal basis by Belavia and Sunday Airlines.

The airport opened in 1983 as Shevchenko-Central and was commonly known as Shevchenko Airport (the airport's current IATA code, SCO, is derived from the city's previous name, Shevchenko).

== Overview ==
In November 1996 the joint stock company Aqtau International Airport was established. The development of the oil industry in the Caspian region required an increase in freight volumes and a rapid delivery of necessary equipment for the oil industry. This, in turn, led to the need for reconstruction of the airfield and an increase in passenger capacity at the terminal. With 1 million passengers passing through in 2018, the airport was the third busiest in Kazakhstan, after Almaty Airport and Astana Airport, and was the 50th-busiest airport in the Post-Soviet states.

== Operations ==
Aktau International Airport is used by 6 airlines flying to 14 destinations in 4 countries. The airport is the primary hub of SCAT Airlines. It has one passenger terminal. In 2018, it served 1 023 900 passengers, making it the third-busiest airport in Kazakhstan. The busiest single destination in passenger numbers is Atyrau. It has one runway designated 11/29 with an asphalt/concrete surface measuring 3,050 m × 60 m (10,007 ft × 197 ft). The airport is able to accommodate jets the size of the AN-124, Boeing 747, Il-76 and lighter, as well as helicopters of all types. However, smaller jets like the Airbus A319, Boeing 737 and CRJ-200 are more commonly seen there.

In 2007, the airport was given a concession period of 30 years to the ATM Group. The contract includes construction of a new passenger terminal. The new terminal was completed in 2009. The capacity was 450 passengers per hour and the total area of 13,400 m^{2} (144,000 sq ft), including the area occupied by the VIP and CIP halls.

The terminal is equipped with electronic and electromechanical systems. These include passenger telescopic ladders, racks of electronic registration, HVAC (heating and cooling system), FIDS (Alert System departures on the electronic scoreboard), X-ray scanners, CCTV, lifts and escalators.

SCAT Airlines is based in Aqtau and operates flights to Baku, Tbilisi, Moscow and various other Russian cities. Air Astana operates daily flights to Atyrau, Almaty and Astana. There are also flights operated by Aeroflot to Moscow.

== Airlines and destinations ==
The following airlines operate regular scheduled and charter services to and from Aqtau:

Airlines	Destinations
Aeroflot	Moscow–Sheremetyevo
Air Astana	Almaty, Astana
Azerbaijan Airlines	Baku
Centrum Air	Nukus
FlyArystan	Almaty, Aqtöbe, Astana, Atyrau, Baku, Dubai–International (suspended until 15 September 2026), Istanbul (resumes 22 October 2026), Kutaisi, Oral, Şymkent, Ürümqi; Seasonal: Batumi
flydubai	Dubai-International (begins 19 December 2026)
Pegasus Airlines	Istanbul–Sabiha Gökçen
Red Wings Airlines	Yekaterinburg
SCAT Airlines	Almaty, Astana, Kökşetau, Qarağandy, Şymkent, Tbilisi, Türkıstan, Urgench, Yerevan; Seasonal charter: Ufa

== Statistics ==
=== Passenger figures ===
Year	Passengers	Change on previous year
2008	474,000	▲24.9 %
2009	450,000	▼5.1 %
2010	585,000	▲30.0%
2011	623,000	▲6.5 %
2012	708,143	▲13.7 %
2013	776,431	▲9.6 %
2014	813,746	▲4.8 %
2015	845,710	▲3.9 %
2016	865,774	▲2.4 %
2017	1,072,400	▲23.9 %
2018	1,023,900	▼4.5 %
2019	996,291	▼2.7 %
2020	688,002	▼30.9 %
2021	1,303,560	▲89.5 %

== Accidents and incidents ==
- On 25 December 2024, Azerbaijan Airlines Flight 8243, an Embraer 190 jet, crashed near the airport as it attempted an emergency landing, saving 29 out of the 67 occupants onboard. The plane, en route from Baku in Azerbaijan to Grozny in Russia, had been rerouted due to fog.

== See also ==
- Transport in Kazakhstan
- List of airports in Kazakhstan
- List of the busiest airports in the former USSR
