= Şymkent International Airport =

Şymkent International Airport Халықаралық Шымкент әуежайы (Kazakh)

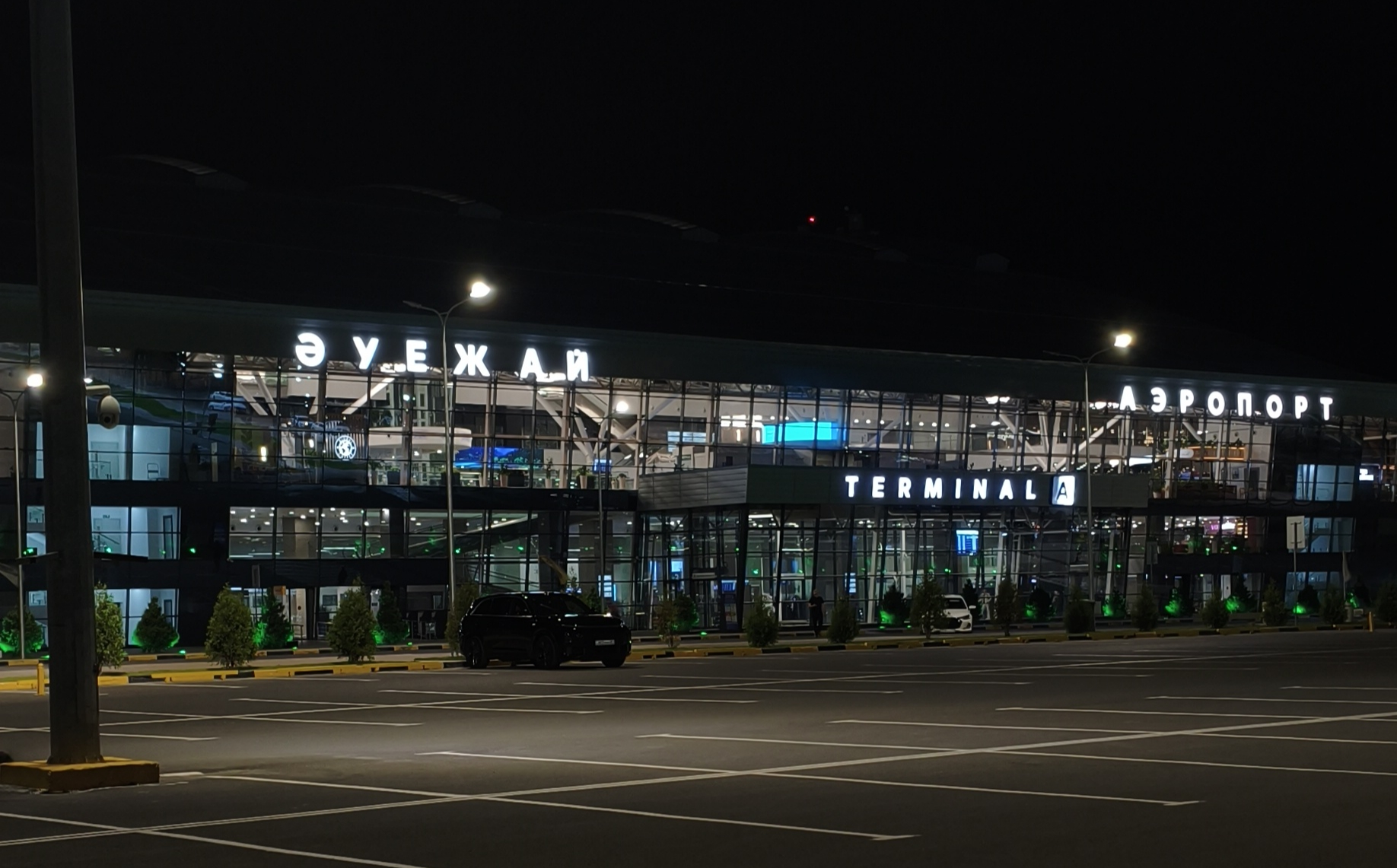
- IATA: CIT; ICAO: UAII

Summary
- Airport type: Public/Military
- Operator: JSC "Şymkent International Airport"
- Serves: Şymkent
- Location: 12.6 km (7.8 mi) NW of Şymkent Railway Station, Kazakhstan
- Hub for: SCAT Airlines
- Elevation AMSL: 422 m (1,385 ft)
- Coordinates: 42°21′54″N 069°28′34″E
- Website: airserver.kz

Maps
- Location in Kazakhstan CIT (West and Central Asia)
- Interactive map of Şymkent International Airport

Runways
Direction	Length		Surface
Direction	m	ft	Surface
10/28	3,300	10,827	Concrete
- Source: AIP Kazakhstan

Şymkent International Airport (Kazakh: Халықаралық Шымкент әуежайы, romanized: Halyqaralyq Şymkent äuejaiy) (IATA: CIT, ICAO: UAII) is an international airport serving Shymkent, Kazakhstan. It has two passenger terminals and one runway. It serves as the main hub for SCAT Airlines, handling a large part of the airline's flights.

== History ==
=== Foundation and early years ===
The airport was established on an agricultural airbase constructed in 1932. The airport started managing both passenger and freight traffic in 1933. The runway and passenger terminal of the airport were completed in 1967 after the airport was relocated to its current position in 1963.

=== Development since the 2000s ===
Following the signing of an agreement in November 2012 by the governments of France and Kazakhstan, Şymkent Airport was made available to French personnel withdrawing from Afghanistan. After arriving on French aircraft, military weaponry was carried from the airport by train to Europe. In order to guarantee the transshipment operations at Şymkent Airport, France was to provide the funding for the construction of the infrastructure required for the temporary bond storage and the space needed for stricter customs checks. Additionally, it paid for the purchase or rental of loading vehicles, to accelerate wagon loading, construction of a 400 m (1,300 ft) hard-surface road, and the protection of freight in temporary storage and during transportation on Kazakhstan's railroad.

The airport experienced a 20% increase in passenger traffic, rising from 440,000 passengers in 2014 to 520,000 passengers in 2017.

== Airlines and destinations ==
=== Passenger ===
Airlines	Destinations
Aeroflot	Moscow–Sheremetyevo
Air Astana	Almaty, Jeddah; Seasonal charter: Doha
Azerbaijan Airlines	Baku
FlyArystan	Almaty, Aqtau, Astana, Atyrau; Seasonal: Batumi, Kutaisi
flydubai	Dubai–International (resumes 25 December 2026)
Pegasus Airlines	Istanbul–Sabiha Gökçen; Seasonal: Antalya
S7 Airlines	Novosibirsk
SCAT Airlines	Almaty, Aqtau, Aqtöbe, Astana, Atyrau, Bangkok–Suvarnabhumi, Bishkek, Budapest, Cairo, Istanbul, Kökşetau, Krasnodar, Krasnoyarsk-International, Moscow–Vnukovo, Munich, Novosibirsk, Saint Petersburg, Sanya (begins 20 October 2026), Seoul–Incheon, Shanghai–Pudong, Singapore (begins 20 October 2026), Tbilisi, Ürümqi, Xi'an; Seasonal: Petropavl
Sunday Airlines	Seasonal charter: Antalya, Sharm El Sheikh
Vietjet Qazaqstan	Almaty, Astana, Jezqazğan

== Accidents and incidents ==
On 12 November 1996, Kazakhstan Airlines Flight 1907, an IL-76TD which took off from Şymkent International Airport collided with Saudia Flight 763, a Boeing 747 which took off from Indira Gandhi International Airport, in the air over Charkhi Dadri, Haryana, India. All 289 passengers and 23 crew on Flight 763 and all 27 passengers and 10 crew on Flight 1907 were killed. A total of 349 people died, making it the deadliest ever mid-air collision involving two aircraft.

== See also ==
- Transport in Kazakhstan
- List of the busiest airports in the former USSR
