= SCAT Airlines =

Airline of Kazakhstan

PLL SCAT Air Company

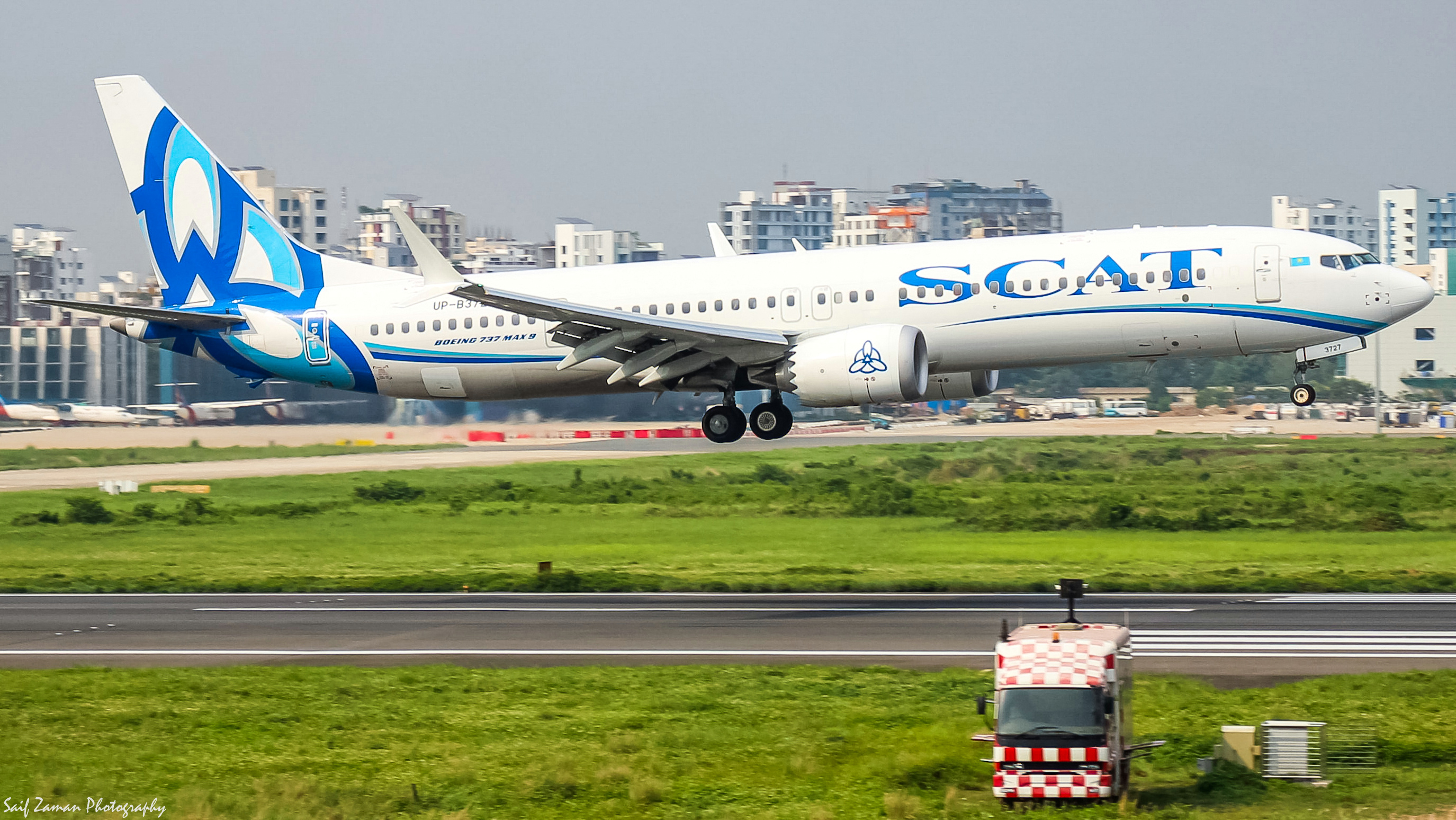
- SCAT Airlines Boeing 737 MAX 9
IATA	ICAO	Call sign
DV	VSV	VLASTA
- Founded: 1997; 29 years ago
- Commenced operations: 1997; 29 years ago
- Hubs: Şymkent International Airport
- Focus cities: Almaty International Airport; Aqtau International Airport; Astana Airport
- Subsidiaries: Sunday Airlines
- Fleet size: 35
- Destinations: 60
- Headquarters: Şymkent, Kazakhstan
- Website: www.scat.kz

SCAT Airlines, legally PLL SCAT Air Company, is an airline from Kazakhstan with its head office at Shymkent International Airport in Şymkent. It operates services to all major cities of Kazakhstan and neighboring countries. Its main base is Şymkent Airport, with focus cities at Aqtau International Airport, Nursultan Nazarbayev International Airport, and Almaty International Airport.

== History ==
The airline was established and started operations in 1997. Its name is the acronym of Special Cargo Air Transport.

SCAT founded Sunday Airlines as a new charter venture and subsidiary, for which SCAT operates four Boeing 757-200s and one Boeing 767-300ER.

In November 2017, the airline signed a firm contract for the purchase of six aircraft of the latest generation Boeing 737 MAX 8 with Boeing. On 29 March 2018, the company's fleet replenished the first Boeing 737 MAX 8 (with CFM International LEAP-1B engines) in any post-Soviet country. This is the first of the six purchased Boeing 737 MAX 8 aircraft.

In 2018, European airspace restrictions were lifted for SCAT Airlines and in May 2018, Vilnius became their first scheduled EU destination. In March 2018, SCAT Airlines was accepted as a full member of the International Air Transport Association (IATA). SCAT Airlines became the second Kazakhstan airline included in the IATA register.

On March 13, 2019, the operation of Boeing 737 MAX aircraft was suspended in Kazakhstan. On February 18, 2021, SCAT Airlines, becoming the first airline outside North America to do so, resumed regular commercial flights on Boeing 737 MAX after an almost two-year ban on the operation of these aircraft in Kazakhstan and elsewhere after two air crashes - Lion Air Flight 610 in October 2018 in Indonesia and Ethiopian Airlines Flight 302 in March 2019 in Ethiopia.

As at August 2026, SCAT was preparing to enter the cargo market with a Boeing 767-300ER being converted to a freighter.

== Destinations ==
=== Codeshare and Interline agreements ===
SCAT Airlines codeshares with Azerbaijan Airlines and interlines with APG Airlines.

== Fleet ==
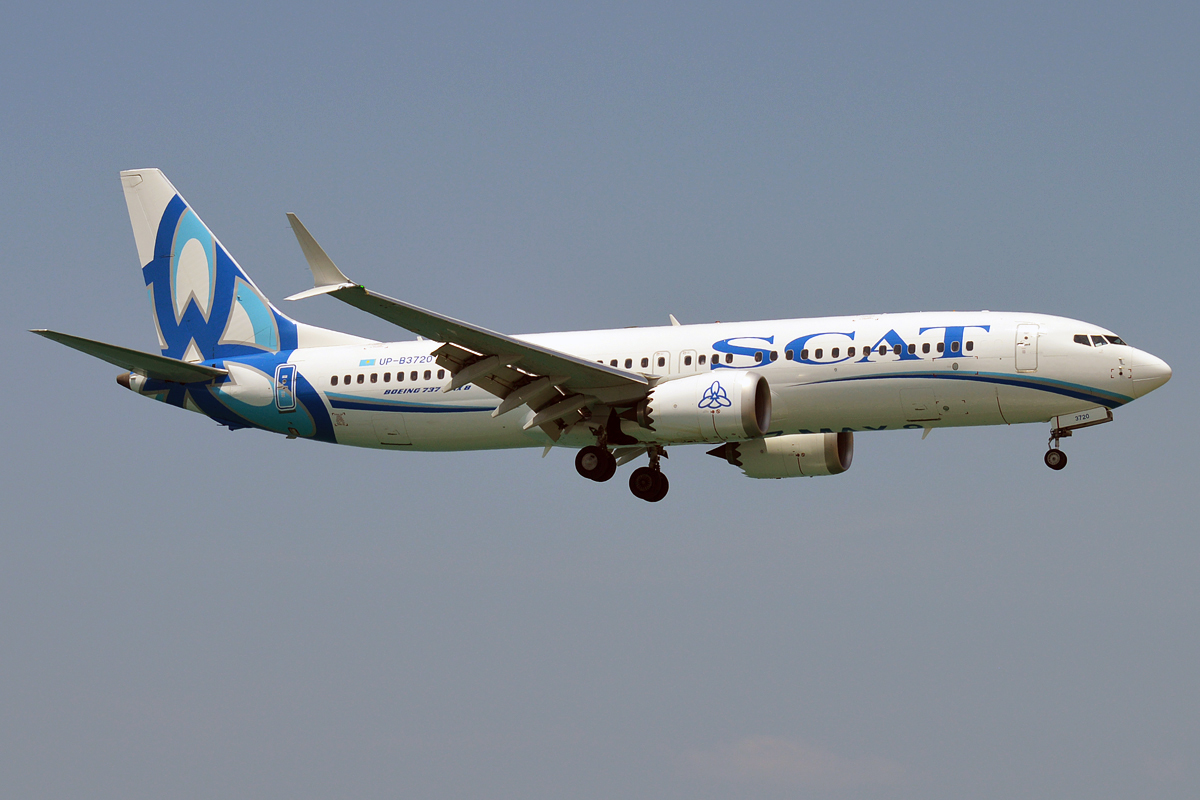
SCAT Airlines Boeing 737 MAX 8

As of July 2026, SCAT Airlines operates the following aircraft:

SCAT Airlines fleet
Aircraft	In service	Orders	Passengers			Notes
Aircraft	In service	Orders	J	Y	Total	Notes
Boeing 737-300	1	—	—	144	144	
Boeing 737-500	3	—	—	118	118	
Boeing 737-700	1	—	—	149	149	
Boeing 737-800	8	—	—	189	189	
Boeing 737 MAX 8	9		—	186	186	Launch CIS customer.
Boeing 737 MAX 9	5	5	—	213	213	Launch CIS customer.
Boeing 757-200	3	—	—	235	235	Operated for Sunday Airlines
Boeing 767-300ER	1	—	32	268	300	Operated for Sunday Airlines
Bombardier CRJ200	4	—	—	50	50	
Boeing 767-300BCF	—	1				First Cargo Aircraft in fleet
Total:	35	6				

== Incidents and accidents ==
- On 29 January 2013, SCAT Airlines Flight 760 crashed near Kyzyltu during a low-visibility approach to Almaty International Airport. All 16 passengers and 5 crew were killed.
- On 26 July 2018, a SCAT Airlines Boeing 757-200, registered as UP-B5705 performing flight DV-5038, struck its tail onto the runway surface with 236 passengers and 9 crew while going around at Almaty International Airport. No passengers or crew suffered injuries. The aircraft, however, received substantial damage.
