= Transport in Kyrgyzstan =

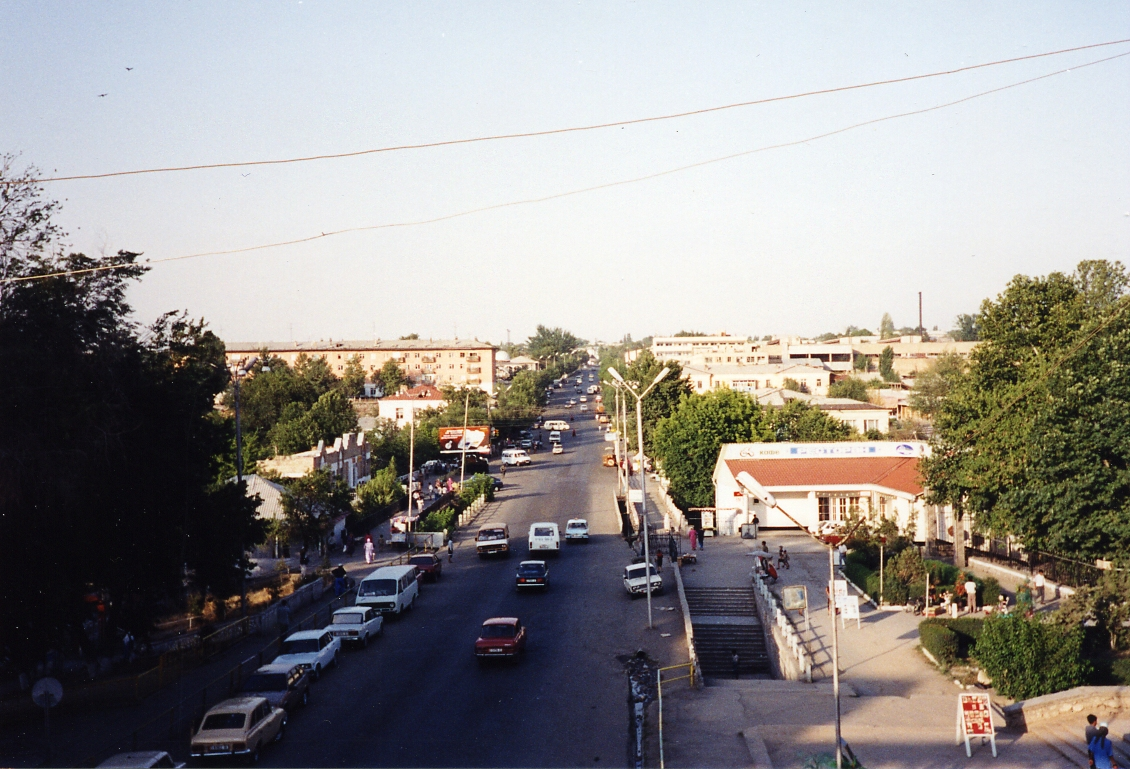
A road in Osh

Transport in Kyrgyzstan is severely constrained by the country's alpine topography. Roads have to snake up steep valleys, cross passes of 3,000 m (9,843 ft) altitude and more, and are subject to frequent mud slides and snow avalanches. Winter travel is close to impossible in many of the more remote and high-altitude regions. Additional problems are because many roads and railway lines built during the Soviet period are today intersected by international boundaries, requiring time-consuming border formalities to cross where they are not completely closed. The horse is still a much used transport option, especially in rural and inaccessible areas, as it does not depend on imported fuel.

== Railways ==
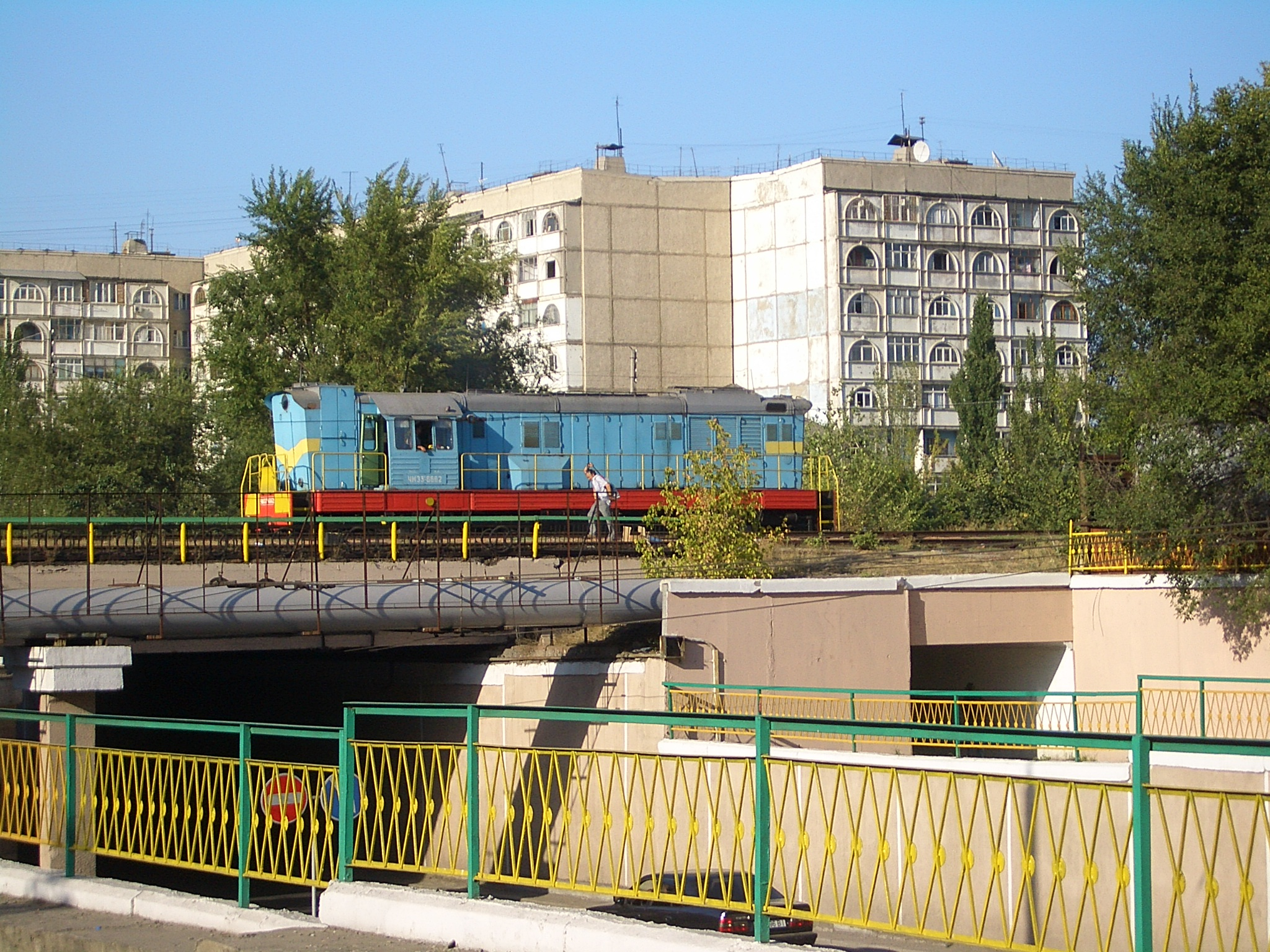
A diesel locomotive near the main train station in Bishkek

The Kyrgyz Railway is currently responsible for railway development and maintenance in the country. The Chüy Valley in the north and the Fergana Valley in the south were endpoints of the Soviet Union's rail system in Central Asia. Following the emergence of independent post-Soviet states, the rail lines which were built without regard for administrative boundaries have been cut by borders, and traffic is therefore severely curtailed. The small bits of rail lines within Kyrgyzstan, about 370 km of 1,520 mm (4 ft 11 27/32 in) broad gauge in total, have little economic value in the absence of the former bulk traffic over long distances to and from such centers as Tashkent, Almaty and the cities of Russia.

In 2022, construction began on a new 186 km extension of the existing railway from Balykchy to Karakeche, primarily meant to carry coal from mines at Karakeche to Bishkek. In June 2023, a railway between Balykchy and Bishkek was officially opened.

President Japarov announced the planned construction of a 523 km China–Kyrgyzstan–Uzbekistan Railway (CKU) in 2022. This project had already been proposed and stalled a number of times since the 2000s, possibly due to Russian and Kazakh opposition at the time. The CKU Railway would comprise 213 km (132 mi) in China, 260 km (162 mi) in Kyrgyzstan and 50 km (31 mi) in Uzbekistan. The railway, conceived as part of China's Belt and Road Initiative, is planned to lead from Kashgar through the Torugart Pass to Jalal-Abad, and further on to the Uzbek city of Andijan. An inaugural ceremony was held in Jalal-Abad in December 2024 and construction is set to begin in July 2025.

=== Rail links with adjacent countries ===
- Kazakhstan - yes - Bishkek branch - same gauge
- Uzbekistan - yes - Osh branch - same gauge
- Tajikistan - no - same gauge
- China - no - Break of gauge 1,520 mm (4 ft 11 27/32 in)/1,435 mm (4 ft 8 1/2 in)

== Highways ==
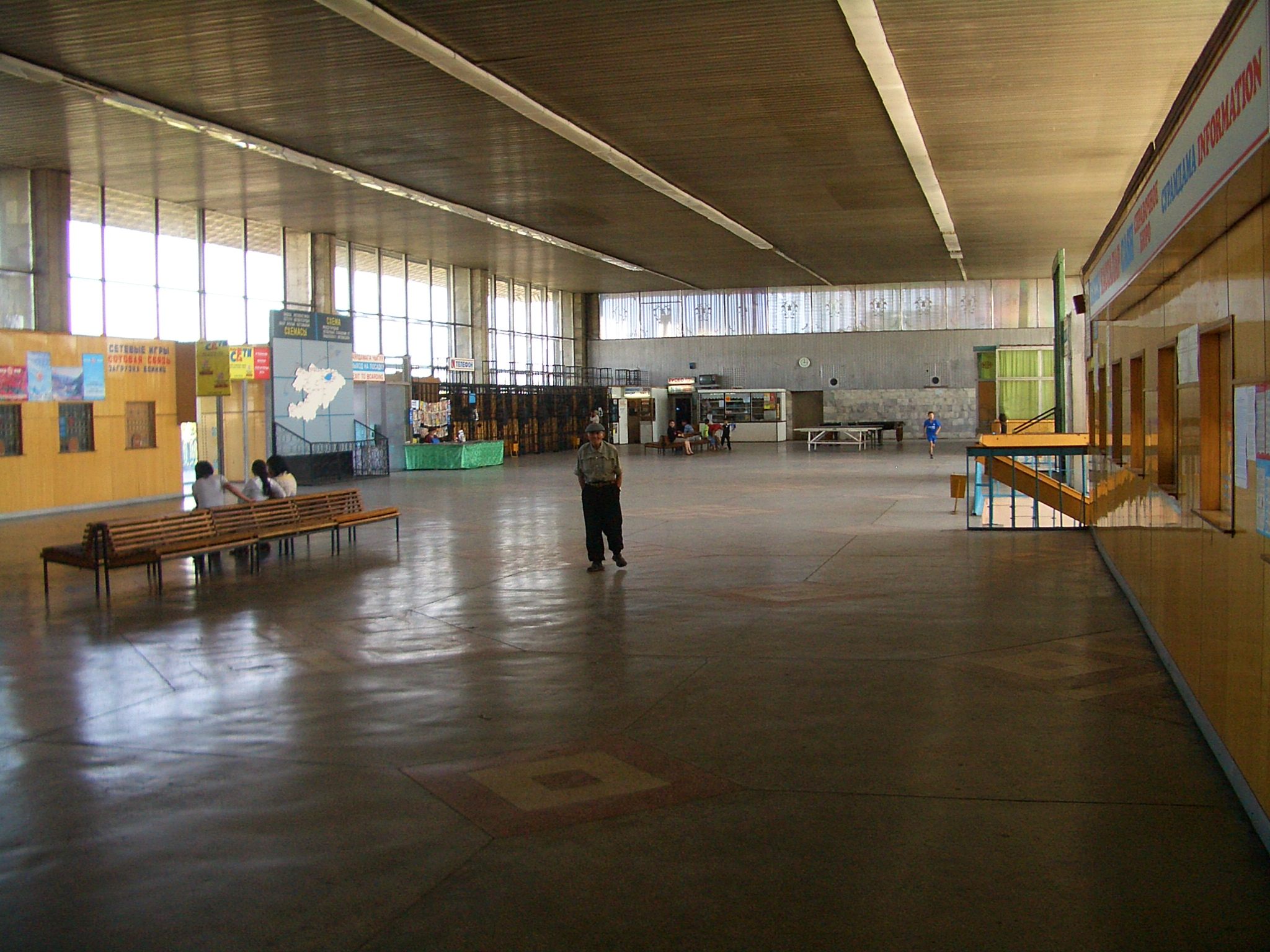
Most of the intercity travelers having switched from the big state-run buses to minivans, the palatial halls of Bishkek's West Bus Terminal remain mostly deserted

With support from the Asian Development Bank, a major road linking the north and southwest from Bishkek to Osh has recently been completed. This considerably eases communication between the two major population centers of the country—the Chüy Valley in the north and the Fergana Valley in the South. An offshoot of this road branches off across a 3,500 meter pass into the Talas Valley in the northwest. Plans are now being formulated to build a major road from Osh into the People's Republic of China.

In 2024, the total length of the road network in Kyrgyzstan was approximately 34,000 km. Of them, 18,810 km were public roads directly subordinated to the Ministry of Transport and Communications, and 15,190 km - other roads (village, agricultural, industrial etc.). By their status the roads of the Ministry of Transport and Communications are classified as:

- international roads: 4,163 km
- state roads: 5,678 km
- local roads: 8,969 km

By nature of surface there can be distinguished:

- hard-surfaced roads: 7,228 km (including 11 km of cement concrete roads, 4,969 km - bituminous concrete surface, 2,248 km - road-mix pavement)
- gravel roads: 9,961 km
- earth roads: 1,621 km

Frequent bus and, more commonly, minibus service connects country's major cities. Minibuses provide public transit in cities and between cities to neighboring villages.

The condition of the road network is generally bad, though repairs have been made recently. Usually, only the main roads of population centres are illuminated, and drain lids might be missing on both streets and sidewalks. The roads are often not plowed during winters. Fuel stations are rare outside Bishkek and Osh.

== Pipelines ==
The limitations of Kyrgyzstan's pipeline system are a major impediment to fuel distribution. In 2006 the country had 367 kilometers of natural gas pipeline and 16 kilometers of oil pipeline, after adding 167 kilometers of natural gas pipeline in 2003.

== Ports and waterways ==
Kyrgyzstan's only port is Balykchy, a fishing town on Issyk Kul Lake. None of Kyrgyzstan's rivers are navigable, and the country has no canals.

Water transport exists only on Issyk Kul Lake, and has drastically shrunk since the end of the Soviet Union.

== Airports ==
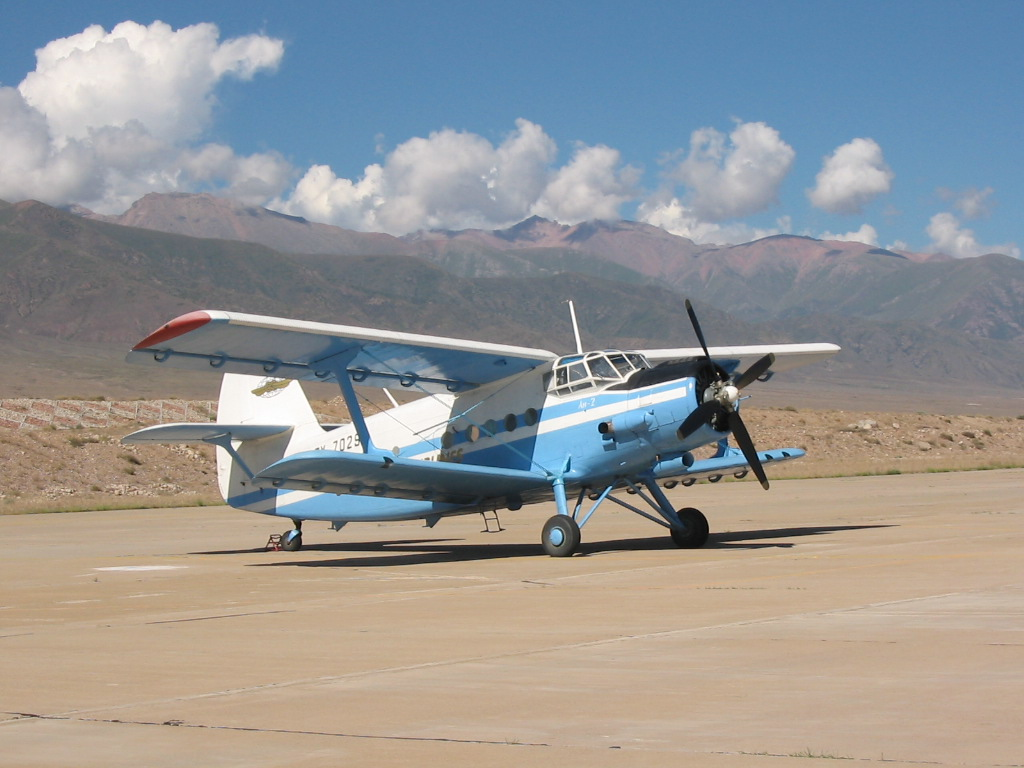
In the little airfield in Tamchy village on Issyk Kul Lake's north shore

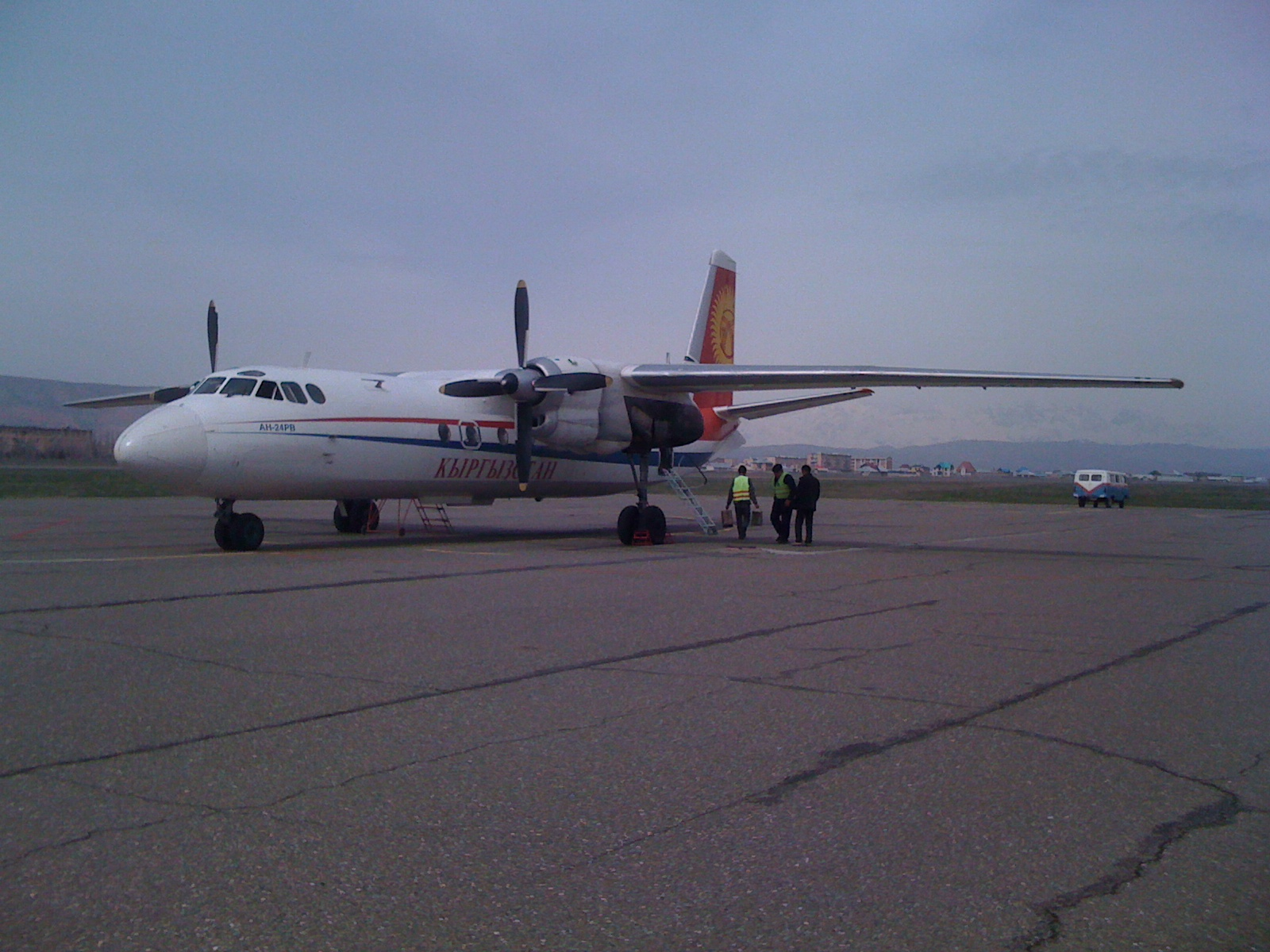
Kyrgyzstan Air Company Antonov AN-24 in Jalal-Abad Airport prepares for flight to Bishkek, March 7, 2010.

At the end of the Soviet period there were about 50 airports and airstrips in Kyrgyzstan, many of them built primarily to serve military purposes in this border region so close to China. Only a few of them remain in service today.

There are four airports with international flights, namely in Bishkek, Osh, Tamchy and Karakol.

- Manas International Airport near Bishkek is the main international terminal, with flights to Moscow, Tashkent, Dushanbe, Istanbul, Baku and Abu Dhabi.
- Osh Airport is the main air terminal in the south, with daily connections to Bishkek and beyond.
- Jalal-Abad Airport is linked to Bishkek by daily flights operated by Asman Airlines, Avia Traffic Company, and TezJet on BAe-146 and DHC-8-400 as well as weekly flights to Jalal-Abad and Toguz-Toro District.
- Issyk-Kul International Airport is linked to Almaty and Tashkent in summers by flights operated by Asman Airlines and Silk Avia on DHC-8-400 linked to Bishkek and Osh.
- Karakol International Airport is linked to Bishkek and Osh by flights operated by Asman Airlines on DHC-8-400.
- Kazarman Airport is linked to Bishkek by flights operated by Asman Airlines on DHC-8-400.
- Kerben Airport is linked to Jalal-Abad and Bishkek by flights operated by Asman Airlines on DHC-8-400.
- Other airports, aerodromes and landing strips are located in Toktogul, Kanysh-Kiya, Ala-Buka, Sakaldy in Nooken District, Batken, Isfana, Kyzyl-Kiya, Naryn, Talas, Pokrovka, Cholpon-Ata, Tamga, Tokmok, Aravan and many other places.
- Other facilities built during the Soviet era are either closed down, used only occasionally or restricted to military use (e.g., Kant airbase, now a Russian air base near Bishkek).

=== Airports with paved runways ===
total: 21
over 3,047 m: 1 (Bishkek-Manas)
2,438 to 3,047 m: 3 (Osh, Kant and Tokmok)
1,524 to 2,437 m: 11 (Jalal-Abad, Karakol International, Kerben, Kazarman, Isfana, Batken, Naryn, Talas, Issyk-Kul International, Kyzyl-Kiya and Cholpon-Ata)
under 914 m: 6 (Tamga, Toktogul, Kanysh-Kiya, Pokrovka, Aravan and Sakaldy) (2012)

=== Airports with unpaved runways (mostly disused) ===
total: 29
2,438 to 3,047 m: 3
1,524 to 2,437 m: 5
914 to 1,523 m: 6 (Gulcha, Daroot-Korgon, Ala-Buka, At-Bashy, Suzak and Chatkal)
under 914 m: 15 (2012)

== See also ==
- Eurasian Land Bridge
- Kyrgyz Railways
- List of airports in Kyrgyzstan
- List of airlines of Kyrgyzstan
- Roads in Kyrgyzstan
- Trans-Asian Railway
- Transport in the Soviet Union
- Turkestan–Siberia Railway
