= List of airports in Kyrgyzstan =

This is a list of airports in Kyrgyzstan, sorted by location.

Airports in Kyrgyzstan

== Airports ==
Airport names shown in bold indicate the airport has scheduled service on commercial airlines. Out of 86 airports, aerodromes and landing strips ever built in Kyrgyzstan, only the ones with functioning runways are listed below.

City served	Region (oblus)	ICAO	IATA	LID	Airport name	Coordinates
Bishkek	Chüy	UCFM	BSZ	БИШ	**Manas International Airport**	43°03′40″N 074°28′39″E
Osh	Osh	UCFO	OSS	ОШШ	**Osh Airport**	40°36′32″N 072°47′35″E
Jalal-Abad	Jalal-Abad	UAFJ	JBD	ДЖБ	**Jalal-Abad Airport**	40°56′39″N 072°58′40″E
Kazarman	Jalal-Abad	UAFZ	-	КЗМ	Kazarman Airport	41°24′37″N 074°02′39″E
Kerben	Jalal-Abad	UAFE	-	КРФ	**Kerben Airport**	41°29′04″N 071°44′01″E
Toktogul	Jalal-Abad	UAFX	-	ТГЛ	Toktogul Airport	41°52′40″N 072°51′44″E
Kanysh-Kyya	Jalal-Abad	-	-	КШЯ	Kanysh-Kiya Airport	41°45′19″N 071°03′02″E
Masy	Jalal-Abad	-	-		Sakaldy (Dubar) Aerodrome	41°00′29″N 072°33′45″E
Batken	Batken	UAFB	-	БАТ	**Batken Airport**	40°02′33″N 070°50′17″E
Razzakov	Batken	UAFI	-	ИФА	**Razzakov Airport**	39°49′29″N 069°34′07″E
Kyzyl-Kyya	Batken	UAFS	-	КЫК	Kyzyl-Kiya Airport	40°16′18″N 072°02′49″E
Daroot-Korgon	Osh	-	-	ДКУ	Daroot-Korgon Airport	39°32′46″N 072°14′57″E
Aravan	Osh	-	-		Aravan Aerodrome	40°31′15″N 072°24′30″E
Madaniyat	Osh	-	-		Madaniyat Aerodrome	40°35′36″N 072°50′56″E
Yntymak	Osh	-	-		Yntymak Aerodrome	40°34′50″N 072°56′0.17″E
Osh (East)	Osh	-	-		Osh (East) Aerodrome	40°32′5″N 072°45′10″E
Naryn	Naryn	UCFN	-	НЫН	**Naryn Airport**	41°26′29″N 076°07′50″E
Talas	Talas	UAFT	-	ТЛС	**Talas Airport**	42°30′21″N 072°15′47″E
Pokrovka	Talas	-	-		Pokrovka Aerodrome	42°42′52″N 071°42′34″E
Tamchy	Issyk-Kul	UCFL	IKL	ИКУ	**Issyk-Kul International Airport**	42°35′18″N 076°42′48″E
Karakol	Issyk-Kul	UCFP	IKG	КПЖ	**Karakol International Airport**	42°30′29″N 078°24′28″E
Cholpon-Ata	Issyk-Kul	UAFG	-	ЧЛА	Cholpon-Ata Airport	42°39′13″N 077°03′24″E
Tamga	Issyk-Kul	UAFA	-	ТМГ	Tamga Airport	42°09′11″N 077°33′50″E
Tokmok	Chüy	UAFF	-	ТКМ	Tokmok Airport	42°49′44″N 075°20′09″E
Chat-Köl	Chüy	-	-		Chatköl Aerodrome	42°59′54″N 074°17′58″E
Kara-Balta	Chüy	-	-		Kara-Balta Aerodrome	42°48′19″N 073°53′33″E
Baytik	Chüy	-	-		Baytik Aerodrome	42°44′30″N 074°32′30″E
Prigorodnoye	Chüy	-	-		Prigorodnoye Aerodrome	42°54′50″N 074°30′28″E
Kant	Chüy	UAFW	-		Kant Air Base	42°51′11″N 074°50′47″E

== See also ==
- Transport in Kyrgyzstan
- List of airports by ICAO code: U#UA - Kazakhstan, Kyrgyzstan
- Wikipedia:WikiProject Aviation/Airline destination lists: Asia#Kyrgyzstan
