= Asman Airlines =

Flag carrier airline of Kyrgyzstan

Asman Airlines "Асман Эйрлайнс" Авиакомпаниясы" ЖЧК
| IATA | ICAO | Call sign |
|---|---|---|
| MN | KGN | MANAS BIRD |
- Founded: 1 July 2023; 3 years ago
- Commenced operations: 27 September 2024; 2 years ago
- Hubs: Manas International Airport
- Focus cities: Osh
- Fleet size: 3
- Destinations: 8
- Headquarters: Manas International Airport, Bishkek, Kyrgyzstan
- Key people: Joldoshbek Aidaraliev (CEO)
- Website: asmanairlines.kg

Asman Airlines (Kyrgyz: Асман Эйрлайнс), is the flag carrier of Kyrgyzstan, operating domestic flights from its base at Manas International Airport.

The airline's corporate headquarters are on the grounds of Manas International Airport in Bishkek, Kyrgyzstan.

It was banned from flying into the EU like all other Kyrgyzstani airlines until 2026 when all Kyrgyzstani airlines were unbanned by the EU. It plans to fly to all 11 airports within Kyrgyzstan by the end of 2025. Furthermore, it has plans to lease two Airbus A320neo family aircraft to launch direct flights to the EU.

== History ==
Asman Airlines is a Kyrgyzstan-based airline, established as a subsidiary of the state-owned Manas International Airport. Joldoshbek Aidaraliev has been appointed as the General Director of Asman Airlines.

From 2023 to 2024, the airline prepared its team and trained employees. Pilots were trained by Canadian specialists, while the flight attendants underwent training with the Russian airline Aurora.

On September 6, 2024, Asman Airlines took delivery of its first aircraft, a Dash 8 Q-400. In September, upon the arrival of its first aircraft, the company received its Air Operator Certificate.

On September 27, 2024, Asman Airlines successfully completed its first scheduled flight from Bishkek to Osh. On September 30, 2024, Asman Airlines operated its first flight from Bishkek to Talas.

On October 7, 2024, Asman Airlines opened its office in Bishkek.

On November 1, 2024, Asman Airlines presented a 5-year business plan developed with the support of the International Air Transport Association (IATA). This plan outlines the airline's strategic objectives, key phases of implementation, and major initiatives for the next several years.

As of December 19, 2024, Asman Airlines has launched twice-weekly flights on the Bishkek–Karakol route.

In January 2025, Asman Airlines launched a flight between Osh and Karakol. The flight duration is 1 hour and 20 minutes. Becoming the first and only airline to connect these two cities with direct flights.

On January 31, Asman Airlines has made a deal to lease two Airbus A320neo family aircraft for 200 million euros, to launch direct flights to Europe, which would require the EU to lift the ban of Kyrgyz Airlines to enter the EU airspace, which happened in June 2026.

On March 1, 2025, Asman Airlines launched flights from Manas International Airport to Kerben, making it the first airline to connect the two cities.

On April 8, 2025, Asman Airlines launched flights between Manas International Airport and Khujand Airport, connecting these two cities after Kyrgyzstan and Tajikistan agreed to settle their border disputes after many clashes over the years.

On May 16, 2025, Asman Airlines, announced the launch of flights between Issyk-Kul International Airport (Tamchy) and Almaty International Airport on June 23, after many years of no connection between these two airports.

== Destinations ==
The airline specializes in regional flights within Kyrgyzstan, aiming to connect various cities across the country. While their main goal is to connect cities across the country, Asman Airlines has a goal to make non-stop flights from Bishkek to European destinations like Berlin, London, and Paris possible. Asman Airlines operates routes to several destinations from Bishkek, including Talas, Osh, Batken, Razzakov and Karakol, Kazarman, Kerben, Naryn, and Jalal-Abad

Destinations served by Asman Airlines
| Country | City | Airport | Notes | Refs |
|---|---|---|---|---|
| Kyrgyzstan | Batken | Batken Airport | | |
| Kyrgyzstan | Bishkek | Manas International Airport | Hub | |
| Kyrgyzstan | Kazarman | Kazarman Airport | | |
| Kyrgyzstan | Tamchy | Issyk-Kul International Airport | | |
| Kyrgyzstan | Jalal-Abad | Jalal-Abad Airport | | |
| Kyrgyzstan | Karakol | Karakol International Airport | | |
| Kyrgyzstan | Kerben | Kerben Airport | | |
| Kyrgyzstan | Naryn | Naryn Airport | | |
| Kyrgyzstan | Osh | Osh International Airport | Focus city | |
| Kyrgyzstan | Razzakov | Razzakov Airport | | |
| Kyrgyzstan | Talas | Talas Airport | | |
| Tajikistan | Khujand | Khujand Airport | | |
| Kazakhstan | Almaty | Almaty International Airport | | |
| Uzbekistan | Tashkent | Tashkent International Airport | | |

=== Interline agreements ===
Asman Airlines has interline agreements with the following airlines:

- Aero Nomad Airlines (from 2024)

Asman Airlines and FlyDubai had agreed to codeshare flights to Europe, starting from September 2025. Though it will require the EU to lift the ban of Kyrgyz Airlines entering the EU airspace, which indeed happened in June 2026.

== Fleet ==
=== Current fleet ===
As of July 2026, Asman Airlines operates the following aircraft:

Asman Airlines fleet
| Aircraft | In service | Orders | Passengers | Notes |
|---|---|---|---|---|
| De Havilland Canada DHC-8-Q400 | 3 | 1 | 80 | |
| Airbus A321neo | — | 2 | TBD | |
| Total | 3 | 3 | | |

=== Fleet development ===
Asman Airlines plans to lease two Airbus A320neo family aircraft, for direct flights from Bishkek to Europe. Proposed routes include connections between Bishkek and Paris, Berlin, and London.

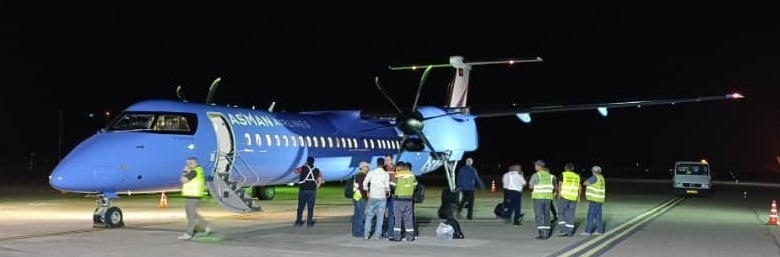
Q400 aircraft of Asman Airlines bearing registration mark EX-21001 parked at Manas International Airport

Its fleet includes two Bombardier Dash 8-400 aircraft, capable of seating up to 80 passengers. Two more Q400 aircraft will arrive in 2025. The airline has plans for expansion, having doubled its fleet size in 2025 to accommodate growing demand and enhance regional connectivity. Asman Airlines has signed a contract with the De Havilland factory in Canada to acquire four aircraft for its fleet.

=== Former fleet ===
As of September 2025, Asman Airlines operated 3 De Havilland Canada DHC-8-Q400.

== See also ==
- List of airlines of Kyrgyzstan
- Transport in Kyrgyzstan
- List of airports in Kyrgyzstan
