= Almaty International Airport =

Busiest airport in Kazakhstan

Almaty International Airport Халықаралық Алматы Әуежайы

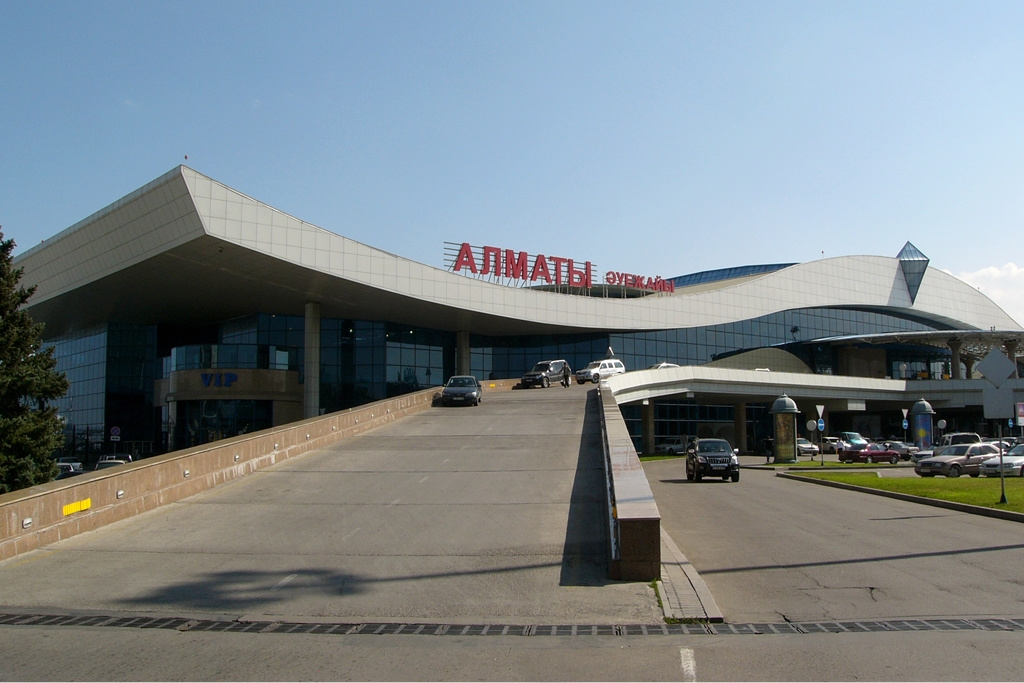
- IATA: ALA; ICAO: UAAA; WMO: 36870

Summary
- Airport type: Public
- Owner: Groupe ADP
- Operator: TAV Airports Holding
- Serves: Almaty
- Location: Almaty, Kazakhstan (inside city limits)
- Hub for: Air Astana; FlyArystan; Sunday Airlines; VietJet Qazaqstan
- Focus city for: SCAT Airlines
- Elevation AMSL: 681 m (2,234 ft)
- Coordinates: 43°21′19″N 077°02′41″E
- Website: alaport.com

Maps
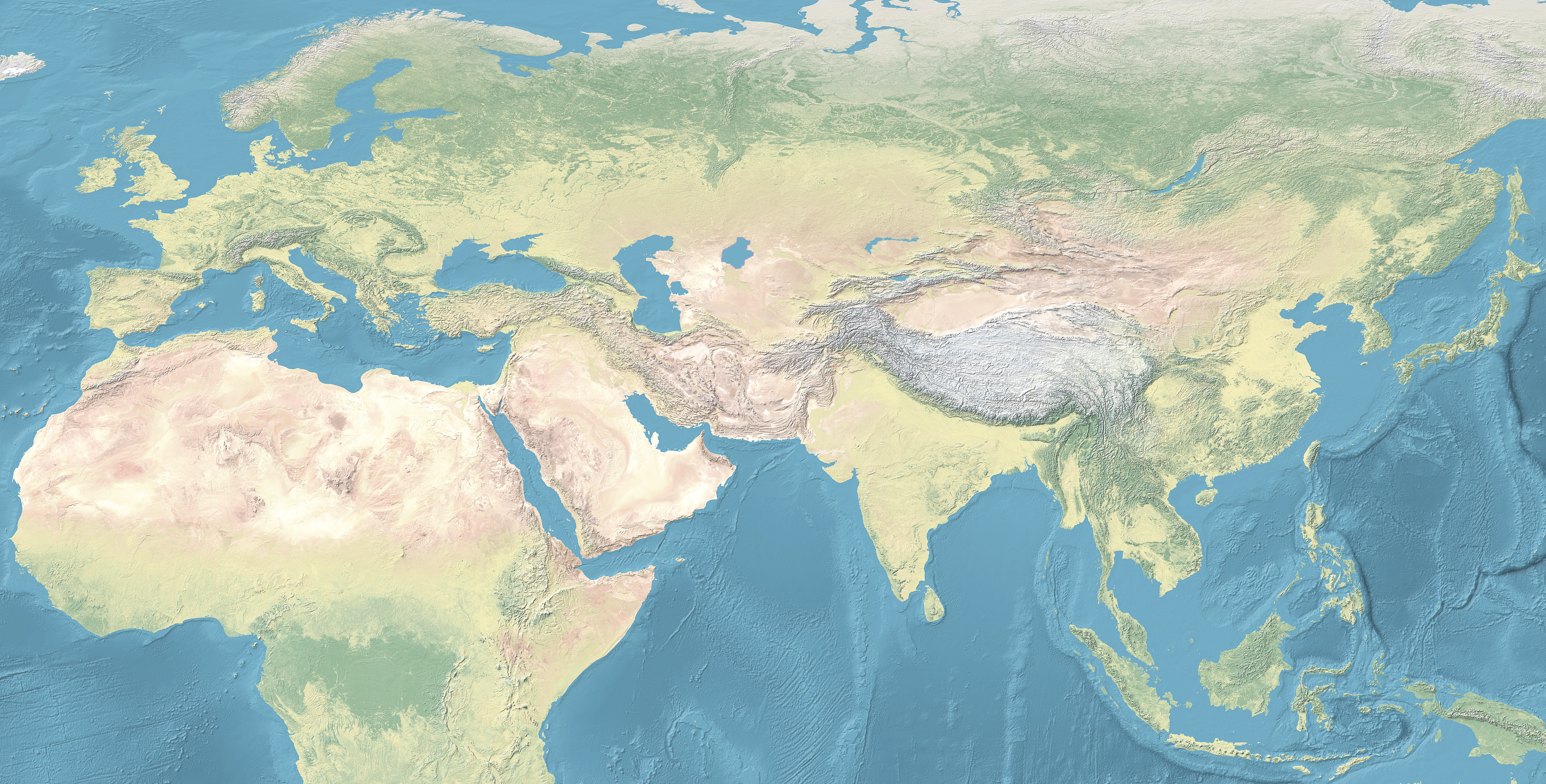
- Location in Almaty, Kazakhstan ALA (Asia) ALA (Eurasia)
- Interactive map of Almaty International Airport

Runways
Direction	Length		Surface
Direction	m	ft	Surface
05R/23L	4,400x60	14,436 × 197	Concrete
05L/23R	4,500x60	14,764 × 197	Concrete

Statistics (2024)
- Passengers: 11,426,650
- Source: AIP Kazakhstan

Almaty International Airport (Note: Kazakh: Халықаралық Алматы Әуежайы, romanized: Halyqaralyq Almaty Äuejaiy; Russian: Международный аэропорт Алматы, romanized: Mezhdunarodny aeroport Almaty) (IATA: ALA, ICAO: UAAA) is an international airport in Almaty, Kazakhstan. It is larger than Nursultan Nazarbayev International Airport (NQZ) in Astana and is the main international gateway into the country. It is a principal hub of Air Astana, the national flag carrier, as well as other domestic and international airlines. The airport plays role in connecting Almaty to the rest of the country and the broader region through its extensive transport links.

As of 2024 it is the busiest airport in Kazakhstan (as well as in Central Asia) and 6th busiest in the Post-Soviet states. In 2022, it served 7.2 million passengers, with 63% traveling on domestic routes and 37% on international flights. Additionally, the airport managed 88,400 tonnes of cargo in 2022, making it the largest airport in the country in terms of cargo volume.

The airport is registered under name of "JSC Almaty International Airport", which is owned by Turkish airport company TAV Airports Holding.

== Location ==
The airport is located approximately 8.1 NM (15.0 km; 9.3 mi) to the north-east of central Almaty, on the outskirts of the city. It is bordered by a mix of open land and residential settlements. The airport is located north of the settlement of Guldala, and north-east of other city districts, including Tbilisskaya and Kolhozshy, all of which lie within the wider region of Almaty.

== History ==
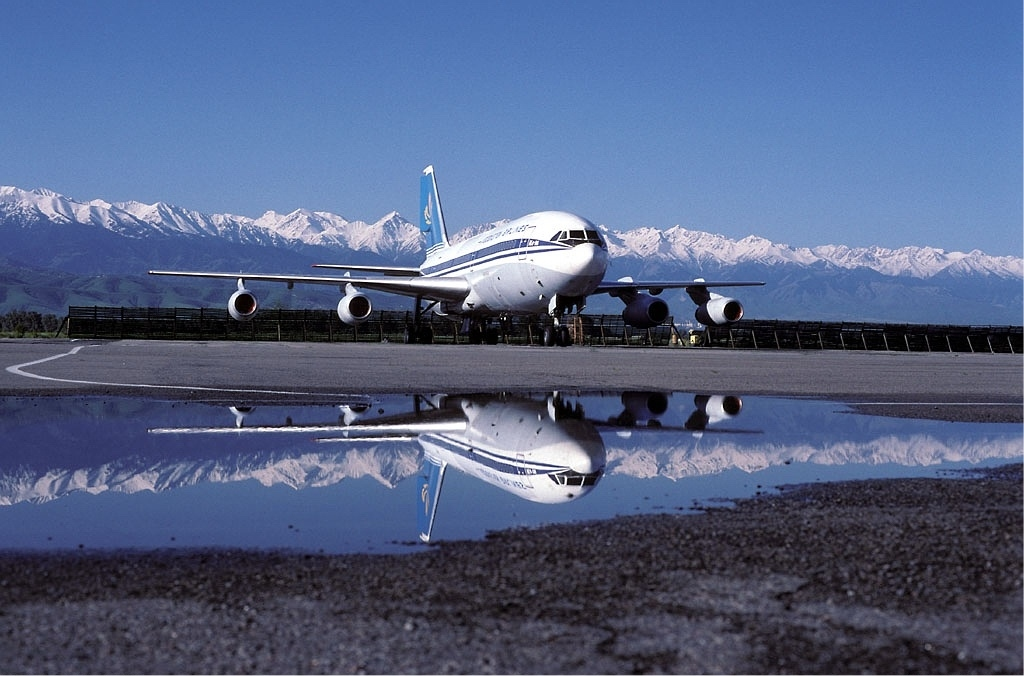
A Kazakhstan Airlines Ilyushin Il-86 at Almaty International Airport in 1996

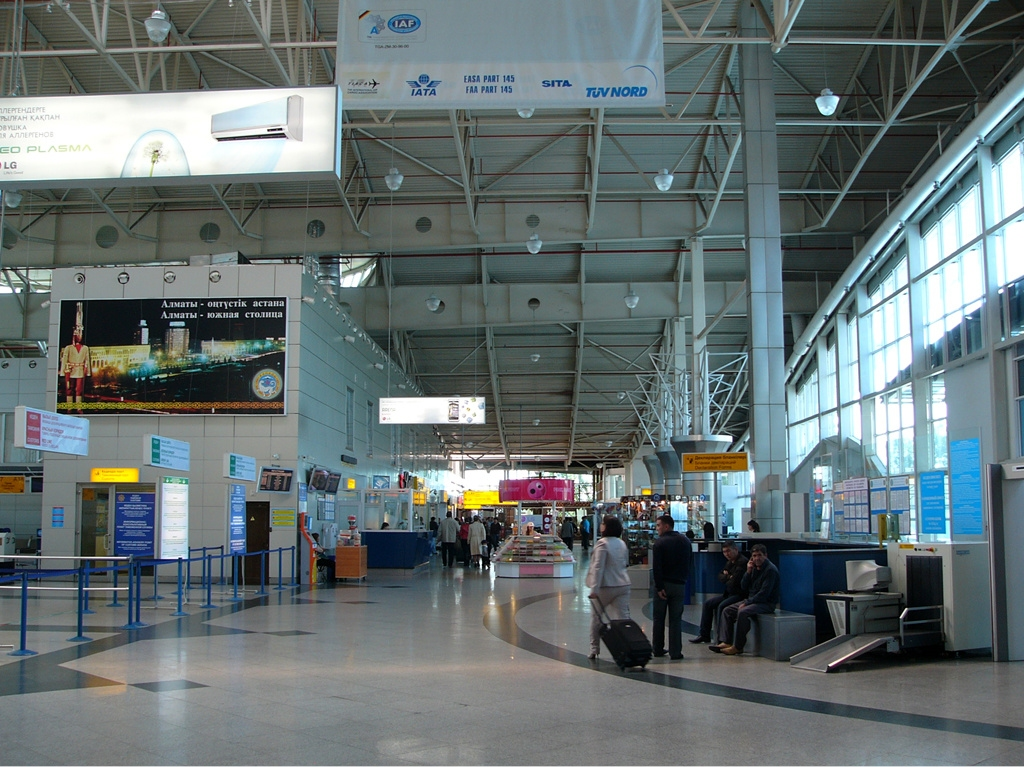
Terminal 1 Check-in hall

=== Early years ===
The airport was built in 1935 for the use of small civil and military aircraft. Till 1990, it was the part of Kazakh Department of Civil Aviation, and then reorganized into "Alma-Ata Airport" in 1991. Since 1993, it has run as an independent business unit. In 1994, it was reorganized into OJSC "Almaty Airport" and later renamed to JSC Almaty International Airport.

The main terminal of Almaty International Airport, located at 2 Mailina Street, was originally built in 1973. The building was designed by architects V. P. Ishchenko, O. N. Naumova, Y. G. Litvinenko, and Y. I. Sharapov, with engineering by K. Nurmakova and Z. Sukhanova. In 1979, it was designated a historical monument, reflecting its architectural and cultural significance.

The supersonic transport (SST) Tupolev Tu-144 began service on 26 December 1975, flying mail and freight between Moscow and Alma-Ata in preparation for passenger services, which commenced in November 1977. The Aeroflot flight on 1 June 1978 was the Tu-144's 55th and last scheduled passenger service.

Following a runway reconstruction in 1998, Almaty airport was awarded a CAT II certificate and the status of an international airport.

On 9–10 July 1999, a fire broke out in the shashlik kitchen and raged for over seven hours, severely damaging key areas such as the restaurant, waiting room, and duty-free shop. The damage rendered the building unusable, and it was later delisted as a historical monument in 2010.

=== Development since 2000 ===
Construction of a new terminal was completed in 2004. On 30 September 2008, a second runway was opened with the first departure being a BMI flight bound for London Heathrow. The new runway was also given an ICAO certificate for CAT III landings which will significantly reduce the number of planes diverting to nearby airfields due to low visibility, especially during the winter months. The runway is the longest in central Asia. The new runway can accept all types of aircraft without limitation of take-off weight and operation frequency.

Growth in connectivity is in danger of being compromised by airport infrastructure that is comparatively expensive and not keeping pace with demand growth. IATA is urging the Kazakhstan government to follow ICAO principles and eliminate differential ANSP charges between domestic and international carriers. In 2012, it was 18% more expensive to turn around an Airbus A320 in Almaty than at similarly sized airports in Europe. The differential rose to 43% for a Boeing 767.

In April 2007, construction began on a new international passenger terminal at Almaty International Airport, designed by the French firm Aeroports de Paris Ingenierie (ADPI). The terminal, inspired by the traditional shape of five yurts, was planned to have six boarding bridges and a capacity of 2,500 passengers per hour. It was part of a larger "Airport City" complex including a Marriott Hotel, conference halls, a business center, and shopping facilities. Located across the airfield from the existing Terminal 1, which was to remain for domestic flights, construction was halted in 2010 following objections from Air Astana. The airline argued that separating terminals would require crossing active runways, causing operational difficulties. A German consulting firm confirmed these concerns and recommended building a new combined terminal to serve both domestic and international flights in a single facility, replacing the partially completed separate terminal. During this period, the terminal was intended to support increased international traffic, including that generated by the 2011 Asian Winter Games, with financing involvement from the Amsterdam Trade Bank. In 2017, the airport announced plans to demolish the unfinished terminal to construct this new integrated terminal, which would eventually replace or work alongside Terminal 1.

On 17 February 2012, in Moscow, at the 32nd session of the Council on Aviation and the Use of Airspace of the Interstate Aviation Committee (IAC), Almaty International Airport was recognized as the best in the CIS and received the prize "For Achievements in the Development of International Airports".

Protesters seized the airport on 5 January during the 2022 Kazakh unrest, halting flights. Kazakh President Kassym-Jomart Tokayev said that eight members of Kazakh security forces had been killed and the insurgents had hijacked five airplanes, and he appealed to Russian security forces to retake the facility. On 7 January, TASS reported that Collective Security Treaty Organization troops had occupied the airport and restored order.

In May 2022, a proposal was made to Deputy Prime Minister Roman Sklyar by a group of deputies from the People's Party of Kazakhstan to name the airport after Kazakh Soviet communist politician Dinmukhamed Kunaev.

To accommodate new terminal construction, the historic VIP terminal was dismantled in late 2022 with plans to reconstruct it 420 m (1,380 ft) away.

On 1 June 2024, Terminal 2 at Almaty International Airport opened, increasing the airport's potential capacity to 14 million passengers per year. Kazakhstan's Ministry of Transport says that 15 new international routes to 10 countries will be launched.

In 2025, TAV Airports launched the Horizon Investment Project, a comprehensive long-term modernisation plan for Almaty International Airport with a budget of approximately $1.5–1.7 billion. The initial phase (2025–2028) includes runway reconstruction, new taxiways, terminal upgrades, and environmental initiatives such as a reagent recycling system for de-icing fluids. Additional plans feature expanded aircraft parking, a new maintenance hangar, and improved passenger facilities including a hotel and multi-level parking. The project aims to increase the airport's capacity to 40 million passengers annually by 2050, with future developments including a third runway and a special economic zone for high-tech industries.

In 2025, Kazakhstan announced plans to operate new flights to Tokyo starting in February 2026. Direct flights to New York were planned for 2026 but were indefinitely postponed pending new aircraft deliveries and the resolution of restrictions on overflights of Russia.

== Terminals ==
=== Terminal 1 ===
The current Terminal 1 was opened on 29 December 2003, following construction that began in 2000 after the 1999 fire. It was designed by architect Qaldybai Montahaev.

=== Terminal 2 ===
Terminal 2 at Almaty International Airport opened on 1 June 2024, exclusively serving international flights. Construction began around 2022 after TAV Airports took full ownership. Designed by French firm ADPi and built by TAV Construction, the terminal covers over 53,000 square meters and includes 50 check-in counters, 20 passport control booths, and four automated e-gates.

Located northeast of Terminal 1 and connected by an indoor bridge, Terminal 2 offers modern facilities such as security checkpoints, immigration, duty-free shops, VIP lounges, and a small museum displaying the airport's history. The terminal was built with a focus on accessibility and sustainability, increasing the airport's annual capacity to 14 million passengers.

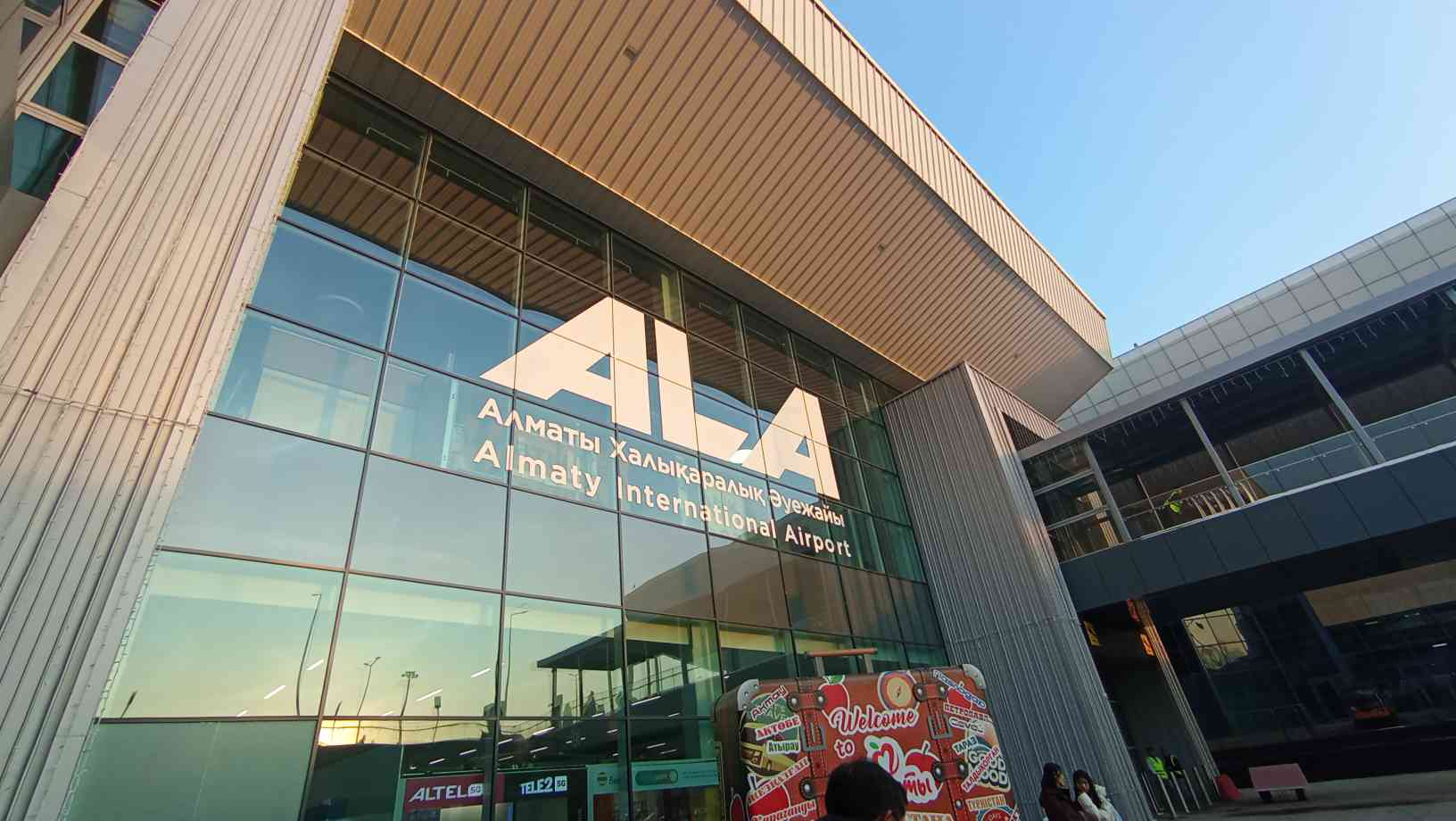
Terminal 2 Exterior

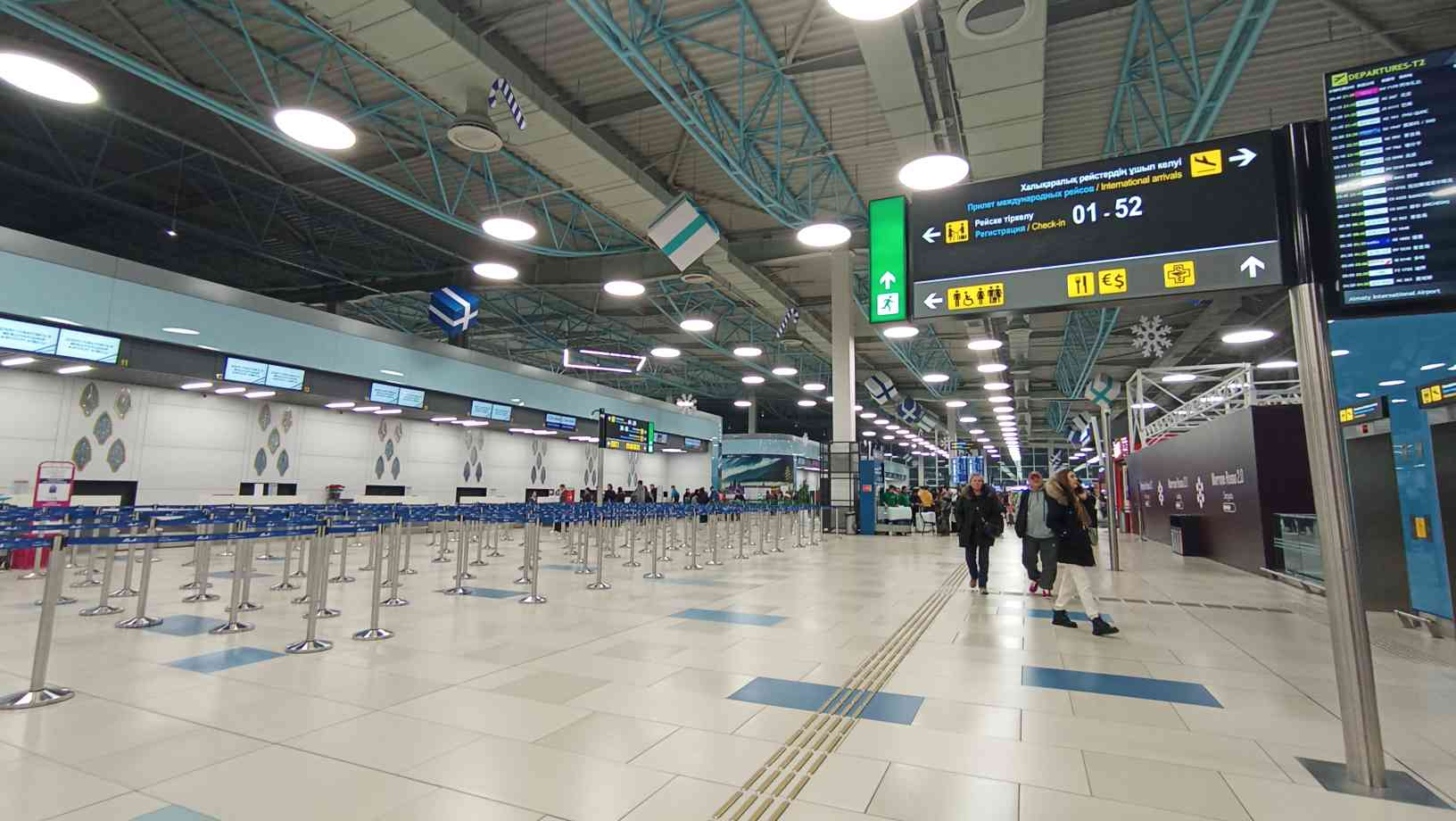
Terminal 2 Departures Hall

== Airlines and destinations ==
=== Passenger ===
The following airlines offer year-round and seasonal scheduled flights to and from Almaty:

Airlines	Destinations
Aeroflot	Moscow–Sheremetyevo
Air Arabia	Abu Dhabi, Kuala Lumpur, Sharjah
Air Astana	Abu Dhabi, Antalya, Aqtau, Aqtöbe, Astana, Atyrau, Baku, Bangkok–Suvarnabhumi, Beijing–Capital, Bishkek, Delhi, Dubai–International, Dushanbe, Frankfurt, Guangzhou, Istanbul, London–Heathrow, Malé, Mumbai, Nha Trang, Oral, Öskemen, Osh, Phuket, Phu Quoc, Qyzylorda, Salalah, Sharm El Sheikh (begins 10 December 2026), Şymkent, Seoul–Incheon, Shanghai–Pudong, Tashkent, Tbilisi, Tokyo-Narita (begins 30 November 2026), Ürümqi; Seasonal: Bodrum, Da Nang, Langkawi, Larnaca, Podgorica
Air Cairo	Seasonal charter: El Alamein, Sharm El Sheikh
Air China	Beijing–Capital
AirAsia X	Kuala Lumpur–International
AJet	Ankara, Istanbul–Sabiha Gökçen (begins 5 January 2027)
Asiana Airlines	Seoul–Incheon (ends 17 December 2026)
Asman Airlines	Issyk-Kul
Azerbaijan Airlines	Baku
Azimuth	Mineralnye Vody,Sochi
Belavia	Minsk
Cathay Pacific	Hong Kong (begins 9 January 2027)
Centrum Air	Nukus, Tashkent
China Eastern Airlines	Shanghai–Pudong
China Southern Airlines	Beijing–Daxing, Guangzhou, Ürümqi, Xi'an
Eastar Jet	Seoul–Incheon; Seasonal: Busan
FlyArystan	Aqtau, Aqtöbe, Astana, Atyrau, Chongqing, Kostanay, Kutaisi, Kyzylorda, Oral, Öskemen, Samarqand, Şymkent, Semey, Pavlodar, Türkıstan, Qarağandy, Qostanai, Urgench, Xi'an, Yining; Seasonal: Batumi, Gazipaşa/Alanya, Issyk-Kul; Seasonal charter: Goa-Manohar
Flydubai	Dubai–International
Flynas	Jeddah
FlyOne	Yerevan
Hunnu Air	Ulaanbaatar
IndiGo	Mumbai
Jazeera Airways	Kuwait City
Loong Air	Hangzhou
LOT Polish Airlines	Warsaw–Chopin
Lufthansa	Frankfurt
Neos	Milan–Malpensa
Pegasus Airlines	Istanbul–Sabiha Gökçen
Qatar Airways	Doha
Qanot Sharq	Tashkent
Qeshm Air	Tehran–Imam Khomeini
Red Sea Airlines	Seasonal charter: Sharm El Sheikh
Red Wings Airlines	Kazan, Yekaterinburg
Rossiya Airlines	Saint Petersburg
S7 Airlines	Novosibirsk
SalamAir	Seasonal: Muscat
SCAT Airlines	Aqtau, Aqtöbe, Astana, Atyrau, Jeddah, Jezqazğan, Kökşetau, Medina, Minsk, Oral, Öskemen, Sanya, Şymkent, Petropavl, Taraz, Türkıstan; Seasonal charter: Goa–Dabolim, Nha Trang, Pattaya, Phuket, Phu Quoc
Somon Air	Dushanbe
Sun PhuQuoc Airways	Seasonal charter: Phu Quoc
Sunday Airlines	Seasonal charter: Phuket
SunExpress	İzmir
Thai AirAsia X	Bangkok–Don Mueang
Turkish Airlines	Istanbul
Uzbekistan Airways	Tashkent, Nukus
VietJet Air	Hanoi, Prague; Seasonal charter: Da Nang
VietJet Qazaqstan	Astana
UVT Aero	Orenburg

=== Cargo ===
Airlines	Destinations
Atlas Air	Amsterdam, Chongqing, Liège, Zaragoza, Zhengzhou
flydubai	Dubai-International
My Freighter	Tashkent
Qatar Airways Cargo	Doha, Hong Kong
Silk Way West Airlines	Baku, Hong Kong

== Statistics ==
=== Annual traffic ===
Annual passenger traffic
Year	Passengers	% change
2010	3,000,000	Steady
2011	3,665,538	▲22.2%
2012	4,003,004	▲9.2%
2013	4,323,224	▲8%
2014	4,588,866	▲6%
2015	4,905,307	▲6.9%
2016	4,878,450	▼0.5%
2017	5,640,800	▲15.6%
2018	5,686,926	▲1%
2019	6,422,721	▲13%
2020	3,669,668	▼42.9%
2021	6,103,657	▲66.3%
2022	7,230,156	▲18.5%
2023	9,547,136	▲32.0%
2024	11,426,650	▲19.7%

== Ground transportation ==
Almaty International Airport can be reached by roadway or public transport. The airport operates two parking lots and is serviced by bus routes 3 and 92, with bus stations located in front of both the domestic (Terminal 1) and international (Terminal 2) terminals. In addition to taxis, ridesharing services such as Yandex Taxi operate to the airport.

== Accidents and incidents ==
- 7 July 1980: Aeroflot Flight 4225, a Tupolev Tu-154B-2, aircraft registration CCCP-85355, crashed shortly after takeoff from Alma-Ata Airport, with the loss of all 156 passengers and 10 crew. Investigators found that the airspeed suddenly dropped because of a downdraft the aircraft encountered during climb out, causing it to stall, crash about 5 km (3.1 mi) from the airport, and catch fire.
- 30 August 1983: Aeroflot Flight 5463, a Tupolev Tu-134, crashed on approach to Almaty after a flight from Chelyabinsk; all 90 passengers and crew died.
- 29 January 2013: SCAT Airlines Flight 760, a Bombardier CRJ-200ER, crashed during a low-visibility approach into Almaty International. All 21 occupants died. Investigators found that during the missed approach necessitated by the inclement weather, the elevator was deflected to lower the nose instead of raising the nose, resulting in a steep dive and impact with the ground; they were unable to determine the cause of the elevator movement but did not find evidence of any system malfunction or external influences.
- 27 December 2019: Thirteen people died when Bek Air Flight 2100, a Fokker 100, en route to Nursultan Nazarbayev International Airport, crashed into a building just after takeoff.
- 13 March 2021: An Antonov An-26 operating for Kazakhstan's Border Service of the National Security Committee crashed on landing; four occupants died and the two survivors reportedly suffered serious injuries. The cause of the accident is under investigation.
- 7 March 2024: Mashrapbek Baratov, a 67-year-old man, took a female airport employee hostage and threatened to detonate a bomb. A bystander managed to subdue the attacker. On 16 July 2025, Baratov was sentenced to 11 years in prison.

== See also ==
- List of airports in Kazakhstan
- List of the busiest airports in the former USSR
