= Toktogul Airport =

Toktogul Airport Токтогул аэропорту
- IATA: none (ТГЛ); ICAO: UAFX

Summary
- Airport type: Public
- Operator: Government
- Serves: Toktogul
- Location: Toktogul District, Jalal-Abad Region
- Elevation AMSL: 3,157 ft / 962 m
- Coordinates: 41°52′40″N 072°51′44″E

Map

Runways
Direction	Length		Surface
Direction	m	ft	Surface
	1,500	4,921	Asphalt

Toktogul Airport (Kyrgyz: Токтогул аэропорту, Russian: Токтогулский аэропорт) (IATA: none (ТГЛ), ICAO: UAFX) is an airport outside Toktogul, an urban-type settlement in Toktogul District of Jalal-Abad Province (oblast) of Kyrgyzstan. The Russian IATA code for Toktogul Airport is ТГЛ.

Toktogul Airport started its operations in the 1950s to serve the transportation needs of the engineers of the nearby Toktogul Hydroelectric Power Plant. The current runway was built in the 1970s. The airport has no terminal, and has no instrument landing facilities and operates only during daylight hours.

Until the 1990s, the airport had flights to Jalal-Abad (Jalal-Abad—Toktogul—Talas), Osh (Osh—Jalal-Abad—Toktogul—Talas) and Talas (Talas—Toktogul—Jalal-Abad).
