= Naryn Airport =

Coordinates: 41°26′29″N 076°07′50″E

Naryn Airport Нарын аэропорту

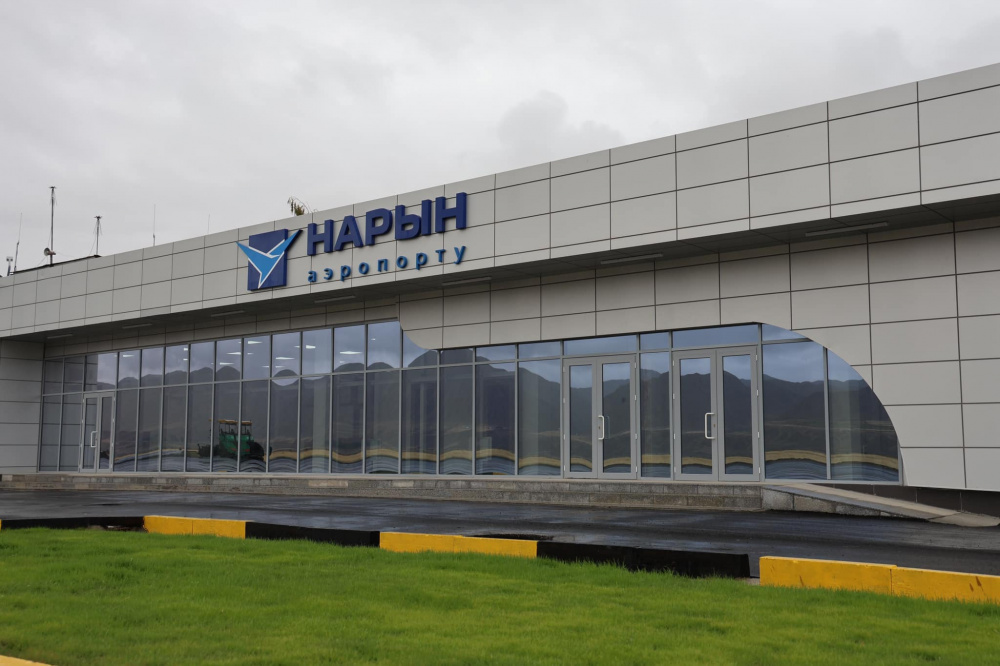
- IATA: none (НЫН); ICAO: UCFN

Summary
- Airport type: Public
- Owner: OJSC Airports of Kyrgyzstan
- Operator: Government
- Serves: Naryn
- Location: Naryn, Kyrgyzstan
- Hub for: Sky Bishkek
- Elevation AMSL: 6,998 ft / 2,133 m

Map

Runways
Direction	Length		Surface
Direction	m	ft	Surface
08/26	2,145	7,037	Asphalt

Naryn Airport (Kyrgyz: Нарын аэропорту, Russian: Нарынский аэропорт) (IATA: none (НЫН), ICAO: UCFN) is an airport serving Naryn, the capital of Naryn Province (oblast) of Kyrgyzstan. The Russian IATA code for Naryn Airport is НЫН.

== History ==
Naryn Airport started its operations in the 1930s as a landing strip in Salkyn-Tör village on the outskirts of Naryn. The current terminal were built in 1964. The runway, taxiways, and apron were commissioned in 1974. It is a regional class 3C airport. The runway 08/26 has a weight limit of 22 tonnes, and has no instrument landing facilities and operates only during daylight hours.

Naryn Airport has no customs and border control checks and serves only flights within Kyrgyzstan. Before the collapse of the Soviet Union, the airport played an important role in this mountainous region. Due to a decrease in air traffic and the absence of passengers, the airport had been idle since 1999. Up until 2000, the airport had year-round links with Jalal-Abad, Kazarman, Osh and Bishkek.

On July 16, 2013, Sky Bishkek resumed flights to Naryn from Bishkek on Tuesdays.

=== Reconstruction ===
The Aga Khan Development Network began reconstructing Naryn Airport in April 2012. The reconstruction includes extending the runway, installing new aero navigational equipment and repairing the terminal building. Following the completion of the reconstruction, the Kyrgyz Government plans to rename the airport to Naryn International Airport and allow international flights.

On March 11, 2023, during a working trip to the Naryn Region, President Sadyr Japarov reviewed the progress of the reconstruction of Naryn Airport. It is planned to repair the asphalt concrete surface of the runway, taxiway, and parking areas of the airport airfield. After the completion of the renovation works, conditions will be established for the resumption of domestic flights to the Naryn Region. In September 2024, the reconstruction was in the final stages of completion.

On September 4, 2025, Asman Airlines operated its first passenger flight on the Bishkek–Naryn route, restoring air service to Naryn after a 12-year break since 2013.

== Airlines and destinations ==
=== Passenger ===
Airlines	Destinations
Asman Airlines	Bishkek

== Ground transportation ==
Only taxis serve the airport.

== Accidents ==
On June 23, 2007, Kyrgyz Ministry of Emergencies’ Yakovlev YAK-40 (EX-901) departed Manas International Airport on an inspection flight QH4452 to Tamchy Airport, Naryn Airport and Kazarman Airport. Some 30 minutes after takeoff from Tamchy Airport, the engine No.3 TGT rose and vibrations occurred. The flight engineer shut down the engine. At the same time, the temperature of engine No.1 began to rise. The captain instructed the flight engineer to reduce thrust to 80% on that engine. The aircraft was over Karakujur valley at the time. Given the limited thrust available and the high mountains in the area, the flight could not reach Naryn. The captain knew a small airstrip in the valley that was used for agricultural operations where he had flown AN-2 aircraft from the airstrip, which was located at 2700 m above sea level. The unprepared strip was covered with rocks (larger than 40 cm). Also irrigation ditches were present and there was a ravine near the strip. The airplane carried out an emergency landing on the airstrip at 11:14 and caught fire. All 13 aboard survived.
