= Aeroflot Flight 5463 =

1983 aviation accident

Coordinates: 43°10′8.04″N 76°41′53.16″E

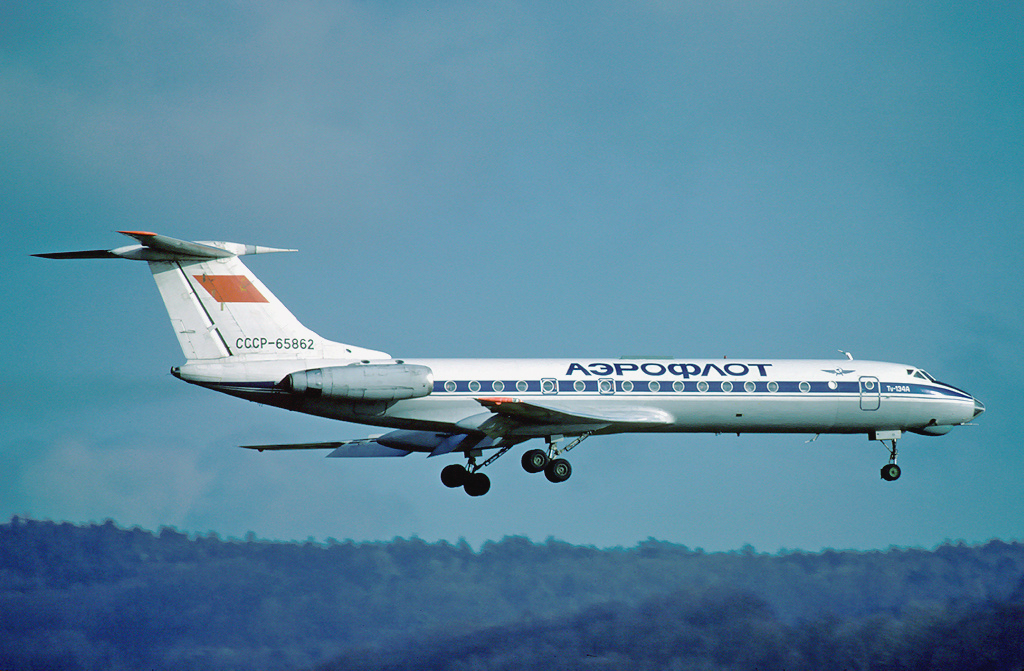
- An Aeroflot Tu-134A in 1983, similar to that involved in the accident.

Accident
- Date: 30 August 1983
- Summary: Controlled flight into terrain caused by pilot error and ATC error
- Site: 36 km (22 mi; 19 nmi) from Alma-Ata Airport, Alma-Ata, Kazakh SSR, Soviet Union

Aircraft
- Aircraft type: Tupolev Tu-134A
- Operator: Aeroflot
- Registration: CCCP-65129
- Flight origin: Chelyabinsk Airport, Chelyabinsk, Russian SFSR, Soviet Union
- Destination: Alma-Ata Airport, Kazakh SSR, Soviet Union
- Occupants: 90
- Passengers: 84
- Crew: 6
- Fatalities: 90
- Survivors: 0

Aeroflot Flight 5463 was a Soviet domestic passenger flight from Chelyabinsk to Almaty which crashed on 30 August 1983 while approaching Almaty. The Tupolev Tu-134A collided with the western slope of Dolan Mountain at an altitude of 690 m (2,260 ft). As a result of the accident, all ninety people on board were killed. Crew error was cited as the cause of the accident.

== Accident ==
Having received the information about the aircraft's location, air traffic control (ATC) gave an erroneous instruction to turn. The crew also mistakenly chose a heading of 199 degrees instead of 140. ATC subsequently gave the proper heading, but instructed the crew to descend to 600 m (2,000 ft), whereas the minimum safe altitude for the surrounding terrain was 4,620 m (15,160 ft). Knowing that the aircraft was on collision course with mountainous terrain and having the right to ignore the ATC in this situation, according to the Soviet flight regulations, the crew chose to make a turn instead, continuing their descent to 600 m (2,000 ft). Having informed ATC of their situation, the crew received a ground proximity warning. Instead of making an urgent climb, the crew delayed any attempt to climb until 1–2 seconds before impact.

The aircraft crashed into Dolan Mountain, at an altitude of 690 m (2,260 ft), 30 km (19 mi; 16 nmi) from Almaty airport, disintegrating and catching fire. At the time of the accident, there was cumulo-nimbus cloud cover at an altitude of 3,000–4,500 m (9,800–14,800 ft) with cloud tops of 7,000–8,000 m (23,000–26,000 ft) and a visibility of 10 km (6.2 mi; 5.4 nmi).

== Investigation ==
The crash of Flight 5463 was attributed to the following causes:

- Violation of the approved approach scheme to Alma-Ata airport
- Failure of the executive flight manager to monitor the situation
- Violation of the flight operations manual by the crew for following the instructions of the final controller to descend below a safe altitude.
