= RUS Aviation =

Cargo airline headquartered in the United Arab Emirates

- Founded: 1999
- Operating bases: Sharjah International Airport
- Fleet size: 3
- Destinations: 9
- Headquarters: Sharjah, United Arab Emirates
- Key people: Saleh al Aroud (Chairman)
- Website: rusaviation.com

RUS Aviation is a cargo airline headquartered in Sharjah, United Arab Emirates and based at Sharjah International Airport.

== Operations ==
RUS Aviation is one of the biggest IL76 & AN12 operator/supplier within UAE and the region. It provides the following services: Cargo Consolidation, Air Charter in UAE, Ground Handling, Flight Planning, Landing Permits, Fuelling. It operates scheduled and charter cargo flights.

== Destinations ==
As of April 2023, RUS Aviation operates scheduled freight services to the following destinations:

Afghanistan

- Kabul - Kabul International Airport

Iraq

- Baghdad - Baghdad International Airport
- Basra - Basra Airport
- Erbil - Erbil International Airport
- Sulaimaniyah - Sulaimaniyah International Airport

Kyrgyzstan

- Bishkek - Manas International Airport

Tajikistan

- Dushanbe - Dushanbe Airport

United Arab Emirates

- Sharjah - Sharjah International Airport base
- Dubai - Al Maktoum International Airport

== Fleet ==
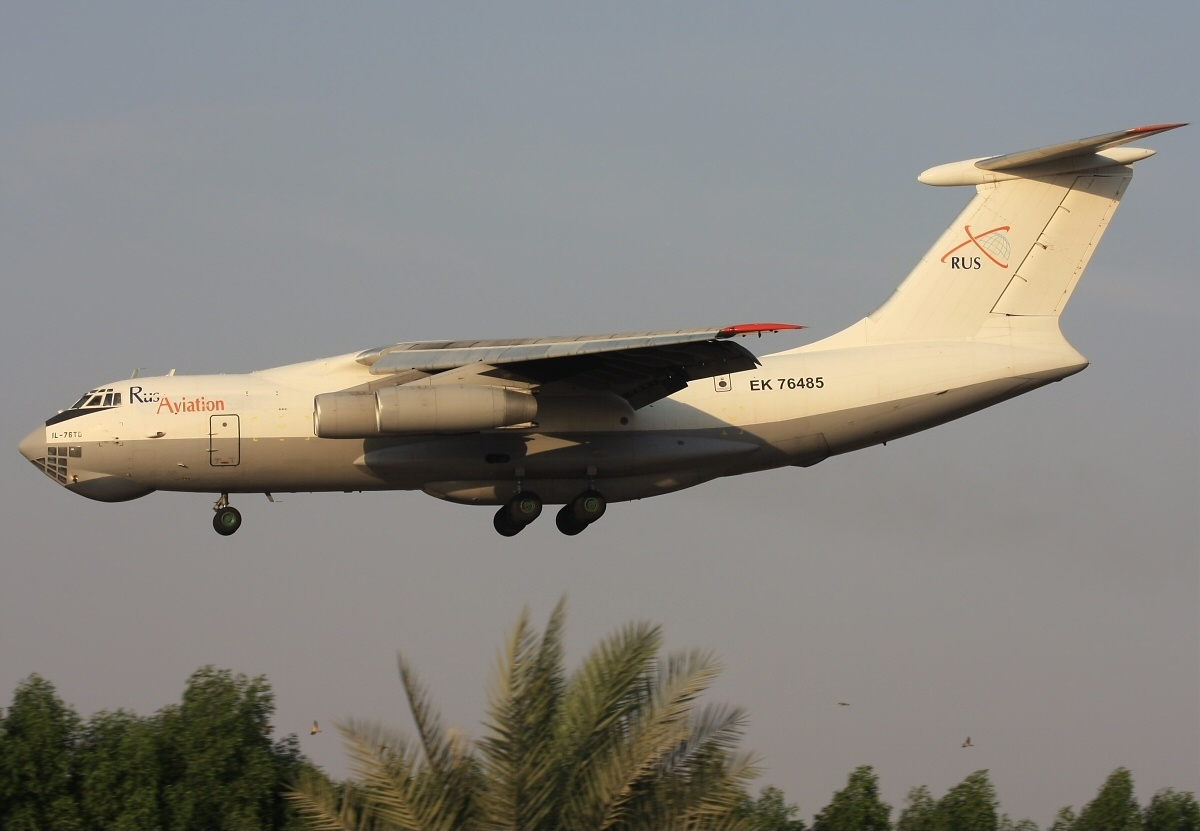
RUS Aviation Ilyushin Il-76TD

As of April 2023, the RUS Aviation fleet consists of the following aircraft:

Aircraft	In service	Orders	Notes
Airbus A300-600F	2	—	
Ilyushin Il-76TD	1	—	
Total	3	—	
