= Jalal-Abad Airport =

Coordinates: 40°56′39″N 072°58′40″E

Jalal-Abad Airport Жалал-Абад аэропорту

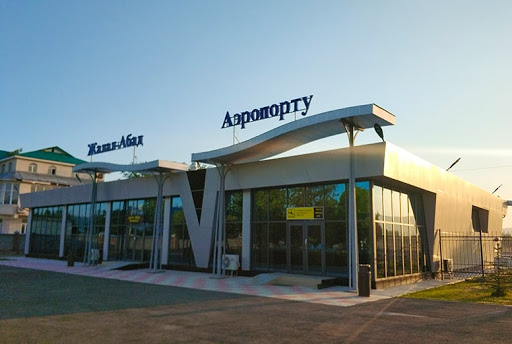
- IATA: JBD (ДЖБ); ICAO: UAFJ

Summary
- Airport type: Public
- Owner: The City of Jalal-Abad
- Operator: Manas International Airport JSC
- Serves: Manas
- Location: Manas, Kyrgyzstan: TezJet Airlines; Avia Traffic Company
- Elevation AMSL: 2,591 ft (790 m)
- Website: n

Map
- Location within Kyrgyzstan

Runways
Direction	Length		Surface
Direction	m	ft	Surface
01/19	1,774	5,827	Asphalt

Jalal-Abad Airport (Kyrgyz: Жалал-Абад аэропорту, Russian: Джалал-Абадский аэропорт) (IATA: none (ДЖБ), ICAO: UAFJ) is an airport serving Manas, the capital of the Jalal-Abad Region (oblast) of Kyrgyzstan. Not to be confused with Jalalabad Airport in Afghanistan. Local travel agents use JBD as an unofficial three-letter airport code in Latin. The local code for Jalal-Abad Airport is ДЖБ.

== History ==
Jalal-Abad Airport started its operations in 1938 as a landing strip in the outskirts of the then small provincial town. In 1947, it became an aerodrome and fully resumed its operations after World War II. The current runway and terminal were built in 1972. It is a regional class 3C airport. The runway 01/19 has a weight limit of 22 tonnes, has no instrument landing facilities, and operates only during daylight hours. The current runway was improved in 2013. The terminal, built in 1972, was completely demolished in November 2017 and the VIP terminal is being used until the new terminal was completed in May 2018. The new terminal building comprising two separate departure and arrival halls and a baggage claim area with a carousel were completed in May 2018 and were operational in June 2018.

Jalal-Abad Airport has no customs and border control checks and serves only flights within Kyrgyzstan. Before the collapse of the Soviet Union, the airport linked Jalal-Abad with cities in Uzbekistan, Kazakhstan and Tajikistan. Up until 2000, the airport had links with Kerben, Kanysh-Kyya, Toktogul, Naryn, Talas, Cholpon-Ata, Karakol, Batken and even with nearby Osh. Flights to Aksy District in northwestern Jalal-Abad Region resumed on March 1, 2013. Following the bankruptcy of Sky Bishkek, flights to Kerben were subsequently cancelled. Flights to Toguz-Toro District in eastern Jalal-Abad Region resumed on April 24, 2013 and are operated on an ad hoc basis. Seasonal flights to Tamchy operate in the summer months.

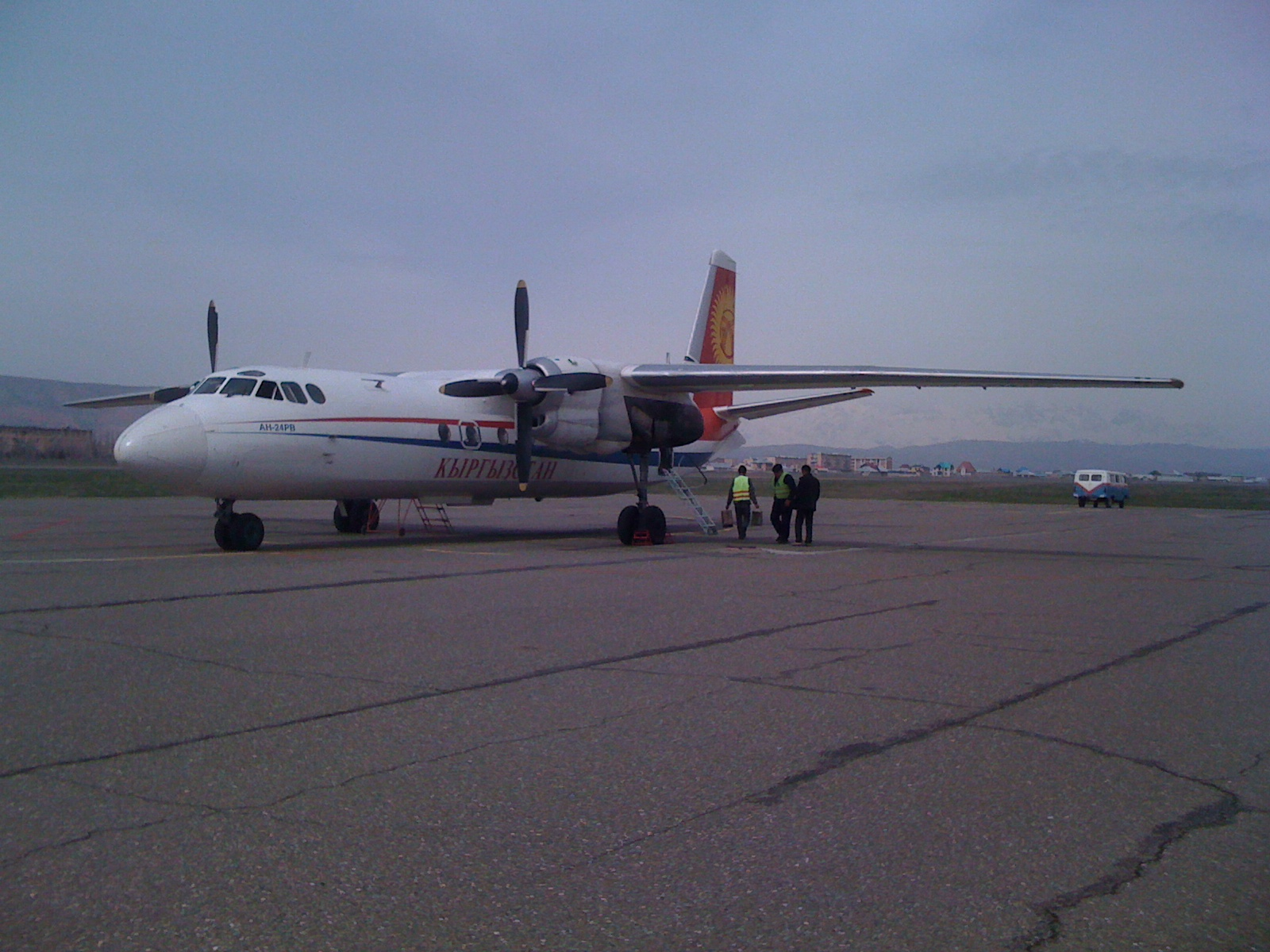
Kyrgyzstan Air Company Antonov AN-24 in Jalal-Abad Airport prepares for flight to Bishkek, March 7, 2010.

== Airlines and destinations ==
Airlines	Destinations
Asman Airlines	Bishkek

== Ground transportation ==
Bus and taxis serve the airport.

== Accidents ==
On September 15, 1989, an Aeroflot Yakovlev YAK-40 (CCCP-87391) had a rough landing. The aircraft was damaged beyond repair after bouncing three times on landing.

On April 14, 1998, a Kyrgyzstan Airlines Yakovlev YAK-40 (EX-87529) overran runway on landing. The aircraft was damaged beyond repair.
