= Manas International Airport =

Manas International Airport Kyrgyz: Манас эл аралык аэропорту, romanized: Manas El Aralyk Aeroportu

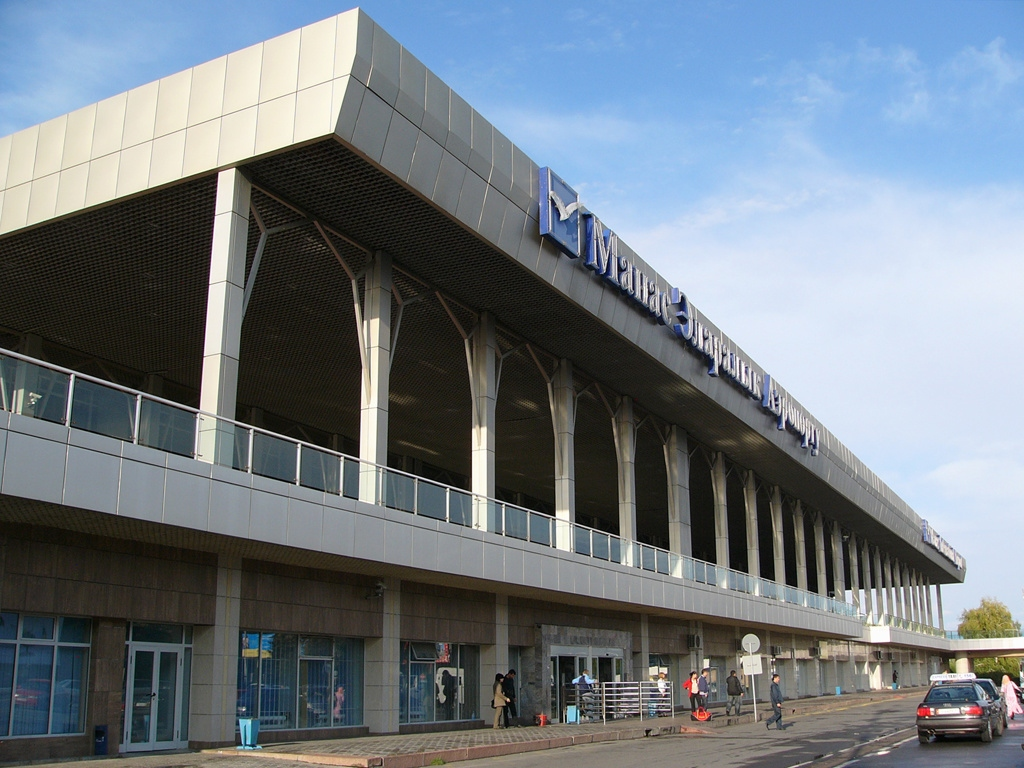
- IATA: BSZ; ICAO: UCFM

Summary
- Airport type: Joint (civil)
- Serves: Bishkek
- Location: Sokuluk District, Kyrgyzstan
- Hub for: Aero Nomad Airlines; Avia Traffic Company; Asman Airlines
- Elevation AMSL: 637 m (2,090 ft)
- Coordinates: 43°03′40″N 74°28′35″E
- Website: airport.kg

Map
- Location of Manas International Airport UCFM (Asia)

Runways
Direction	Length		Surface
Direction	m	ft	Surface
07/25	4,204	13,792	Concrete

Statistics (2017)
- Passengers: 3,586,337
- Source: AIP Kyrgyzstan

Manas International Airport (Kyrgyz: Манас эл аралык аэропорту, romanized: Manas El Aralyk Aeroportu; Russian: Международный аэропорт Манас, romanized: Mezhdunarodnyy aeroport Manas) (IATA: BSZ, ICAO: UCFM) is the main international airport in Kyrgyzstan, located 25 kilometres (16 mi) north-northwest of the capital, Bishkek.

== History ==
The airport was constructed as a replacement for the former Frunzensky Airport that was located to the south of the city, and named after Kyrgyz epic hero, Manas, suggested by writer and intellectual Chinghiz Aitmatov. The first plane landed at Manas in October 1974, with Soviet Premier Alexei Kosygin on board. Aeroflot operated the first scheduled flight to Moscow–Domodedovo on 4 May 1975.

When Kyrgyzstan gained independence from the Soviet Union in December 1991, the airport began a steady decline as its infrastructure was neglected for almost ten years and a sizable aircraft boneyard developed. Approximately 60 derelict aircraft from the Soviet era, ranging in size from helicopters to full-sized airliners, were left in mothballs on the airport ramp at the eastern end of the field.

After the 11 September terrorist attacks and the beginning of the United States invasion of Afghanistan, the United States Department of Defense immediately sought permission from the Kyrgyz government to use the airport as a military base. U.S. forces arrived in late December 2001 and immediately the airport saw unprecedented expansion of operations and facilities. The derelict aircraft were rolled into a pasture next to the ramp to make room for coalition aircraft, and large, semi-permanent hangars were constructed to house coalition fighter aircraft. Additionally, a Marsden Matting parking apron was built along the Eastern half of the runway, along with a large cargo depot and several aircraft maintenance facilities. A tent city sprang up across the street from the passenger terminal, housing over 2,000 troops. The American forces christened the site "Ganci Air Base", after New York Fire Department chief Peter J. Ganci, Jr., who was killed in the 11 September terrorist attacks. It was later given the official name of Manas Air Base, renamed Transit Center at Manas in 2009, and closed and handed over to Kyrgyz authorities in 2014.

In 2004, a new parking ramp was added in front of the passenger terminal to make room for larger refueling and transport aircraft such as the KC-135 and C-17.

Around the same time, the Kyrgyz government performed a major expansion and renovation of the passenger terminal, funded in part by the sizable landing fees paid by coalition forces. Several restaurants, gift shops, and barber shops sprang up in the terminal, catering to the deployed troops.

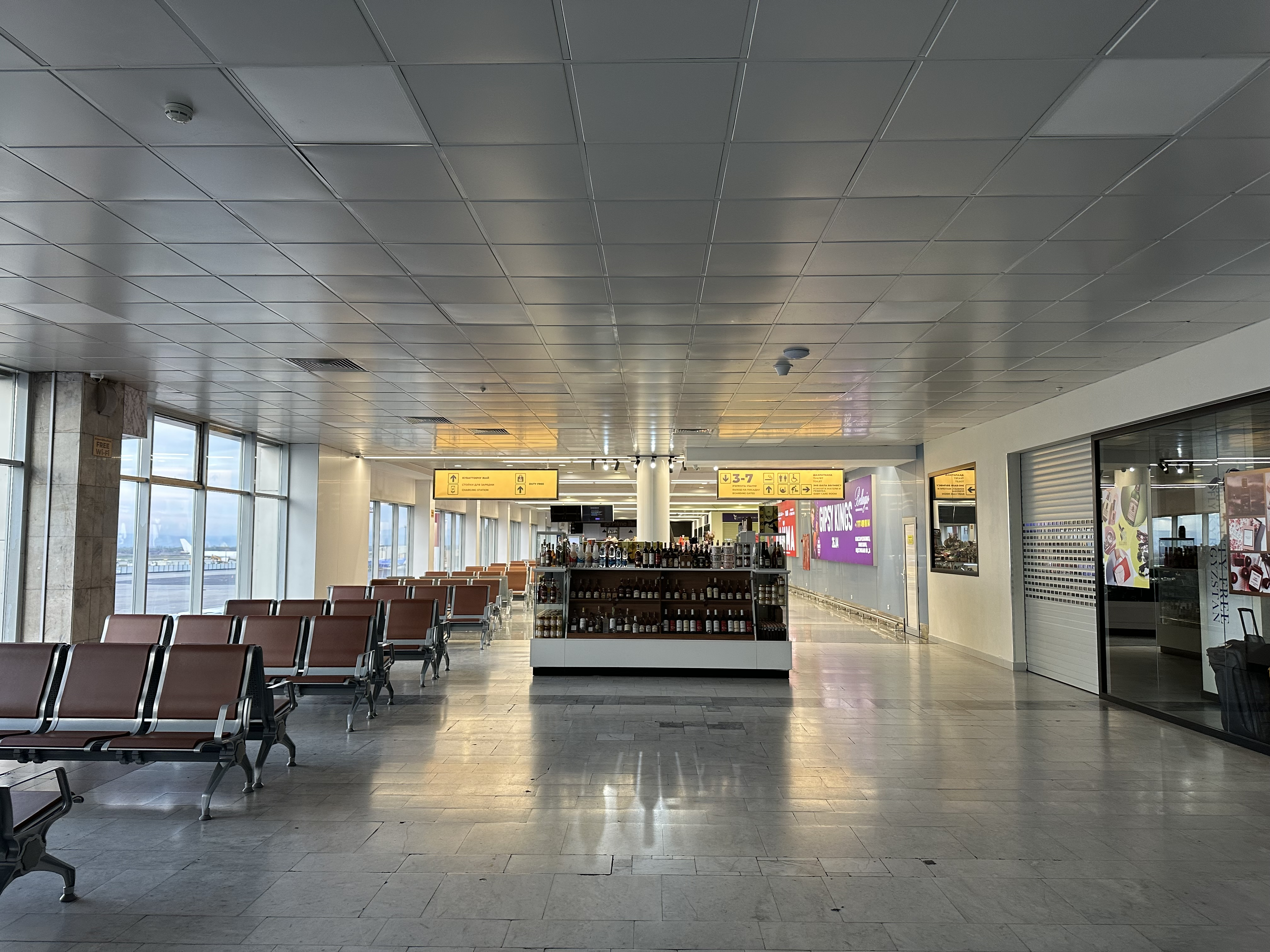
Manas International Airport interior

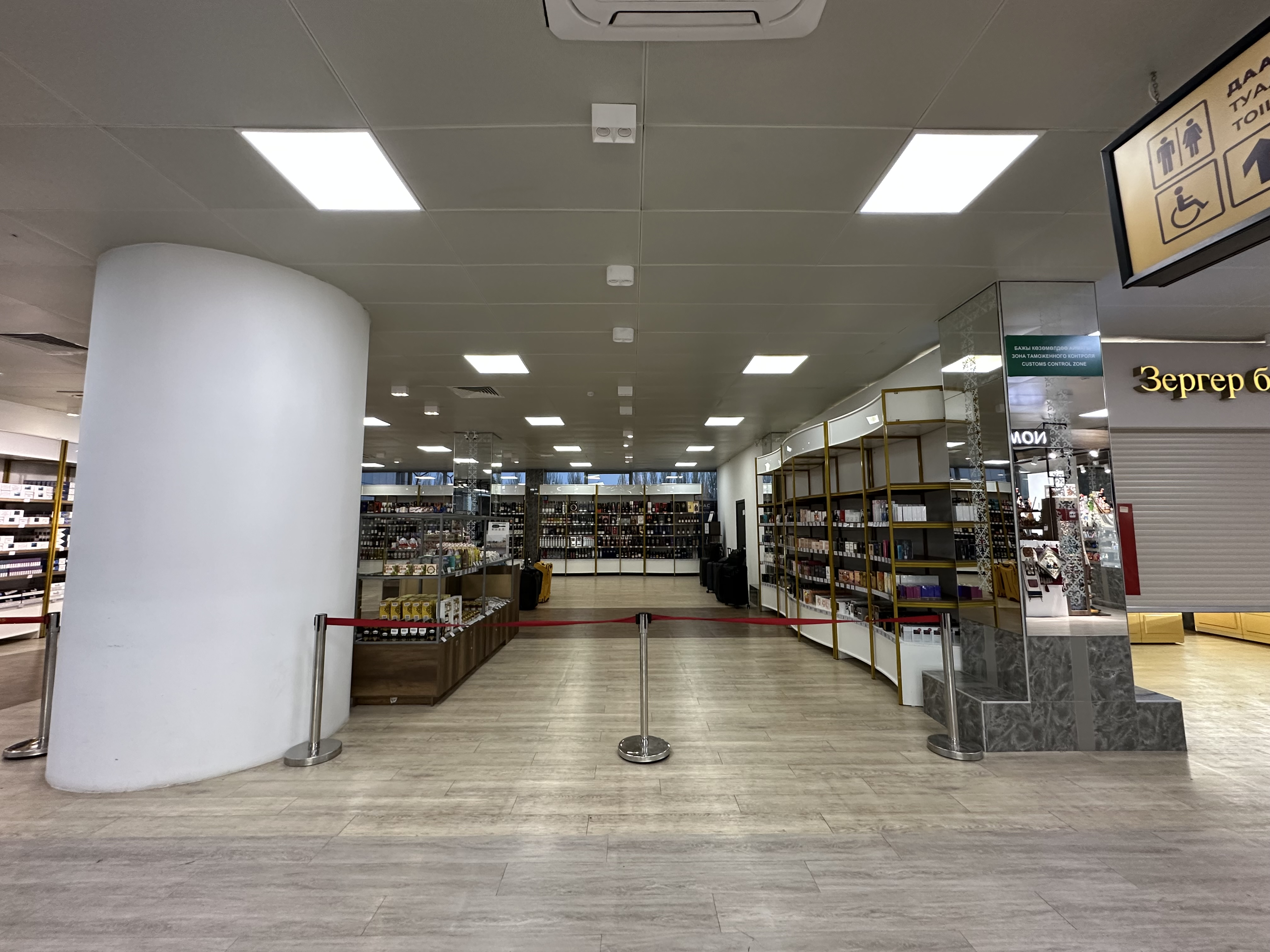
Manas International Airport shops

The airport terminal underwent renovation and redesign in 2007. On 9 August 2025 Manas International Airport changed IATA code to BSZ. The former IATA code, FRU, originated from the Soviet name of the city of Bishkek, then called Frunze. In 2012, the airport handled 1,056,000 passengers.

=== Redevelopment ===
On 7 March 2025, a major modernization of Manas International Airport's infrastructure began under the leadership of the China Road and Bridge Corporation. The project included upgrading the runway, apron, and airfield lighting systems, with completion scheduled by the end of 2025.

The modernization plan expands the terminal complex by 18,000 square meters, increasing its total area from 38,919 to 56,919 square meters. The upgrade features an increased number of check-in counters, expanded waiting areas, and the creation of modern lounge and dining zones. To enhance passenger convenience, new technological solutions are being implemented to improve operational efficiency. A key architectural feature of the redevelopment is the construction of a covered skywalk to connect the main airport buildings, providing weather protection and facilitating faster transit between terminals.

Following the opening of the airport's new western wing on 14 May 2026, the main entrance of Manas International Airport officially reopened on 12 July 2026. These updates are part of a broader modernization project aimed at increasing capacity and improving passenger comfort. While the main entrance and western section are now operational, interior renovation works continue within the older part of the terminal.

== Facilities ==
The airport operates 24 hours a day and its ILS system meets ICAO CAT II standards, enabling flight operations in low ceilings (30 meters or 100 feet) and visibilities (350 m or 1,150 ft).

During its existence, Kyrgyzstan Airlines had its head office on the airport property. On 2 January 2002, the airline moved its head office to the Kyrgyzstan Airlines Sales Agency building of Manas International Airport. Previously the head office was also on the grounds of the airport.

== Airlines and destinations ==
=== Passenger ===
Airlines	Destinations
Aero Nomad Airlines	Delhi, Islamabad, Lahore, Moscow–Vnukovo, Tashkent, Osh, Surgut, Ürümqi; Seasonal charter: Nha Trang, Phu Quoc
Aeroflot	Moscow–Sheremetyevo
Air Arabia	Sharjah
Air Astana	Almaty
Air China	Beijing-Capital
AJet	Ankara, Istanbul–Sabiha Gökçen
Asman Airlines	Batken, Manas, Karakol, Kerben, Naryn, Osh, Razzakov, Talas, Kazarman
Avia Traffic Company	Dushanbe, Grozny, Kazan, Krasnoyarsk–Yemelyanovo, Moscow–Domodedovo, Novosibirsk, Osh, Saint Petersburg
Azerbaijan Airlines	Baku
Centrum Air	Tashkent
China Southern Airlines	Beijing–Daxing, Guangzhou, Ürümqi
Flydubai	Dubai–International
Flynas	Jeddah
Jazeera Airways	Kuwait City
Loong Air	Chengdu–Tianfu, Xi'an
Nordwind Airlines	Kazan
Pegasus Airlines	Antalya, Istanbul–Sabiha Gökçen
Red Sea Airlines	Seasonal charter: Sharm El Sheikh
Red Wings Airlines	Makhachkala
Rossiya Airlines	Krasnoyarsk–Yemelyanovo
S7 Airlines	Novosibirsk
SCAT Airlines	Şymkent
Sky FRU	Osh, Moscow–Domodedovo
Somon Air	Dushanbe
Trinity Airways	Seoul–Incheon
Turkish Airlines	Istanbul
Ural Airlines	Moscow–Domodedovo, Yekaterinburg
Utair	Surgut, Tyumen
Qanot Sharq	Phuket, Tashkent
Uzbekistan Airways	Tashkent
Vietjet Qazaqstan	Astana

=== Cargo ===
Airlines	Destinations
My Freighter	Tashkent
RUS Aviation	Sharjah
Silk Way Airlines	Baku, Ürümqi
Turkish Cargo	Almaty, Bangkok–Suvarnabhumi, Guangzhou, Islamabad, Istanbul, Shanghai–Pudong
Uzbekistan Airways Cargo	Navoiy
YTO Cargo Airlines	Shijiazhuang

== Statistics ==
=== Annual traffic ===
Annual passenger traffic
Year	Passengers	% change
2012	1,056,000	Steady
2013	N/A	N/A
2014	N/A	N/A
2015	N/A	N/A
2016	3,082,931	N/A
2017	3,586,337	▲16.3%

== Accidents and incidents ==
- On 23 October 2002, an Ilyushin IL-62 airliner operated by the Tretyakovo Air Transport Company crashed on takeoff after running off the end of the runway. There were no passengers aboard and all eleven crew members escaped, with only minor injuries. The pilot was pulled from the aircraft by responding U.S. Air Force Security Forces personnel of the 111th Security Forces Squadron, 111th Fighter Wing, from the Pennsylvania Air National Guard. The injured were treated at the joint US Air Force and South Korean army clinic at Manas Air Base. The wreckage was bulldozed by Kyrgyz personnel and left at the site. Airport operations resumed before the crash site had finished smoldering.
- On 26 September 2006, a Kyrgyzstan Airlines Tupolev Tu-154 aircraft taking off for Moscow–Domodedovo collided on the runway with a US Air Force KC-135 tanker that had just landed. The Tupolev, with 52 passengers and nine crew on board, lost part of its wing but was able to take off and return to make a safe landing with a 2.5 m section of its wing missing. The KC-135, with three crew members and a cargo of jet fuel, caught fire and was destroyed. There were no injuries on either aircraft.
- On 24 August 2008, Iran Aseman Airlines Flight 6895 (a Boeing 737 operated by Itek Air) heading to Tehran with 90 people aboard crashed 3 kilometres (1.9 mi) from the airport, killing 68. 22 people, including two crew members, survived the crash. According to an airport official, the crew had reported a technical problem on board and were returning to the airport when the plane went down.
- On 28 December 2011, a Kyrgyzstan Airlines Tupolev Tu-134, which had taken off from Bishkek, crashed while attempting to land at Osh, causing 31 injuries.
- On 16 January 2017, Turkish Airlines Flight 6491, a Boeing 747-400F operated by ACT Airlines under wet lease for Turkish Cargo, en route from Hong Kong to Istanbul via Bishkek, missed the runway on landing in thick fog, crashing into a village. At least 38 people were killed, including all four crew members and 34 people on the ground.

== See also ==
- List of the busiest airports in the former USSR
- Transportation in Kyrgyzstan
