= Semetey =

- Location within Kyrgyzstan
- Coordinates: 42°45′0″N 71°36′0″E
- Country: Kyrgyzstan
- Region: Talas
- District: Manas
- Elevation: 746 m (2,448 ft)

Population (2021)
  - Total: 8,522
- Time zone: UTC+6 (KGT)

Semetey (Kyrgyz: Семетей), before 2025 Pokrovka (Russian: Покровка), is a village in the Talas Region of Kyrgyzstan. It is the administrative seat of Manas District. Its population was 8,522 in 2021.

== Population ==
Historical population
Year	Pop.	±% p.a.
2009	7,419	—
2021	8,522	+1.16%
Note: resident population; Sources:
