= Kyzyl-Kiya Airport =

Airport in Kyzyl-Kiya, Kyrgyzstan

Kyzyl-Kiya Airport Кызыл-Кыя аэропорту
- IATA: none (КЫК); ICAO: UAFS

Summary
- Airport type: Public
- Operator: Government
- Serves: Kyzyl-Kiya and Pulgon
- Location: Kyzyl-Kiya, Kadamjay District
- Hub for: Kyrgyzstan Air Company
- Elevation AMSL: 2,928 ft / 892 m
- Coordinates: 40°16′18″N 072°02′49″E

Map

Runways
Direction	Length		Surface
Direction	m	ft	Surface
11/29	1,600	5,249	Asphalt

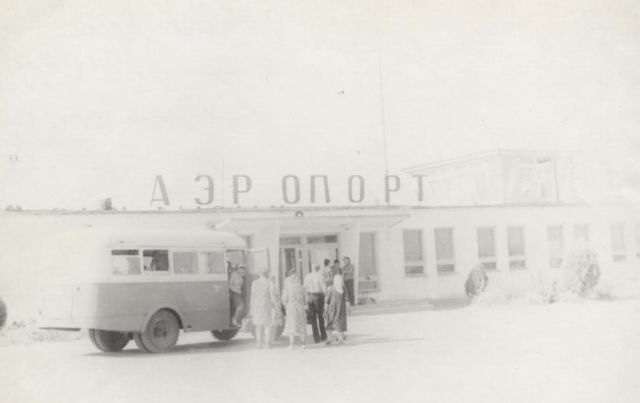
Kyzyl-Kiya Airport

The Kyzyl-Kiya Airport (Kyrgyz: Кызыл-Кыя аэропорту, Russian: Кызыл-Кийский аэропорт) (IATA: none (КЫК), ICAO: UAFS) serves Kyzyl-Kiya and Pulgon, towns in Kadamjay District of Batken Province (oblast), Kyrgyzstan. The Russian IATA code for Kyzyl-Kiya Airport is КЫК.

Kyzyl-Kiya Airport started operations in the 1930s as a landing strip near the mining town. The current runway and terminal were built in the 1970s. It is a regional class 3C airport. The runway has a weight limit of 22 tonnes, and has no instrument landing facilities and operates only during daylight hours.

Although Kyzyl-Kiya Airport is near the border with Uzbekistan, it has no customs and border control checks and serves only flights within Kyrgyzstan. Until 2002, Kyzyl-Kiya had year-round links with Bishkek, Osh and Cholpon-Ata.
