= Razzakov Airport =

Isfana Iskhak Razzakov Airport Исхак Раззаков Исфана аэропорту

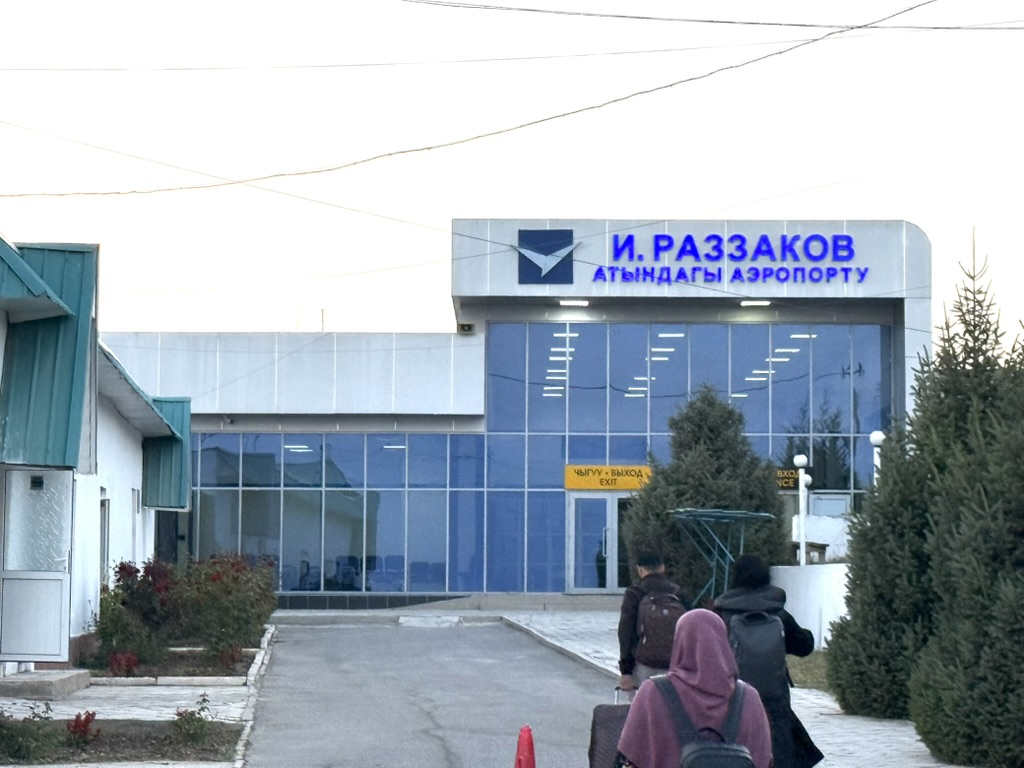
- IATA: none (ИФА); ICAO: UAFI

Summary
- Airport type: Public
- Operator: Government
- Serves: Razzakov and Sulukta
- Location: Razzakov, Leilek District
- Hub for: TezJet Airlines, Avia Traffic
- Elevation AMSL: 4,527 ft (1,380 m)
- Coordinates: 39°49′29″N 069°34′07″E

Map
- Location within Kyrgyzstan

Runways
| Direction | Length | | Surface |
| Direction | m | ft | Surface |
|---|---|---|---|
| 10/28 | 1,700 | 5,577 | Asphalt |

Isfana Iskhak Razzakov Airport (Kyrgyz: Исхак Раззаков Исфана аэропорту) (IATA: none (ИФА), ICAO: UAFI) is an airport serving Isfana and Sulukta, towns in Leilek District of Batken Region (oblast) of Kyrgyzstan. The Russian IATA code for Isfana Iskhak Razzakov Airport is ИФА. Although Isfana Iskhak Razzakov Airport is near the border with Tajikistan, it has no customs and border control checks and serves only flights within Kyrgyzstan. The terminal complex is designed to handle domestic flights during daylight hours.

== History ==
Isfana Iskhak Razzakov Airport started its operations in the 1940s as a landing strip near the town of Isfana. After Kalacha Airport, serving the coal mining town of Sulukta (16 km north of Isfana), was closed, Isfana Iskhak Razzakov Airport started serving Sulukta residents as well. The current runway and terminal were built in 1974. It is a regional class 3C airport. The runway has a weight limit of 22 tonnes, and has no instrument landing facilities and operates only during daylight hours.

In Soviet times, it accommodated aircraft such as the Yak-40, An-2, An-26, An-28, BAE-146-200, and helicopters of all types.

In the early 1990s, Isfana Iskhak Razzakov Airport halted its operation because of technical problems. It remained closed for twenty years. In 2007, after the terminal and the track were repaired, the airport was reopened. It was temporarily closed in early 2014, but was reopened later that year. The airport was closed once again from November 2019 to June 2020 while the terminal and runway were renovated. As part of a joint project in 2019, a new terminal was built with a total area of 553 square meters, featuring new check-in counters, screening equipment, a baggage carousel, and a mother-and-child room. The reconstruction was completed in July 2020.

In 2020, the airport was renamed in honor of Iskhak Razzakov who served as the first secretary of the Communist Party of the Kyrgyz SSR.

== Facilities ==
The runway is 1,735 meters long and 35 meters wide.

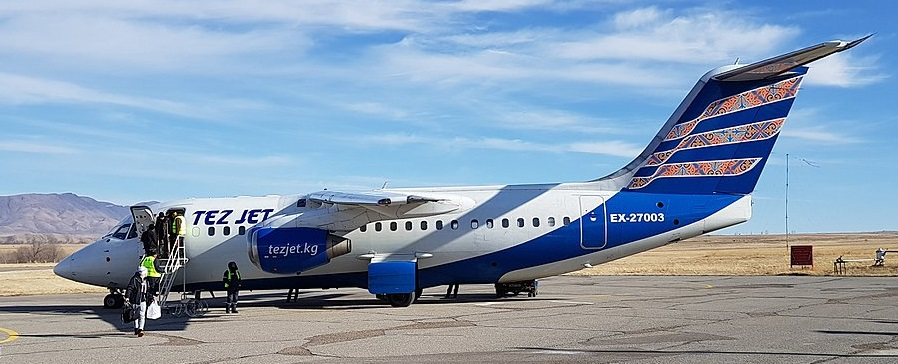
Avro RJ85 operated by TezJet at Isfana Airport

== Airlines and destinations ==
| Airlines | Destinations |
|---|---|
| Asman Airlines | Bishkek |
