= Tokmok Airport =

Tokmok Airport Токмок аэропорту
- IATA: none (ТКМ); ICAO: UAFF

Summary
- Airport type: Public
- Operator: Government
- Serves: Tokmok
- Location: Chüy District, Chüy Region
- Elevation AMSL: 2,769 ft / 844 m
- Coordinates: 42°49′44″N 075°20′09″E

Map

Runways
Direction	Length		Surface
Direction	m	ft	Surface
09/27	2,500	8,202	Asphalt

Tokmok Airport (Kyrgyz: Токмок аэропорту, Russian: Токмакский аэропорт) (IATA: none (ТКМ), ICAO: UAFF) is an airport outside Tokmok, a town in the Chüy Region (oblast) of Kyrgyzstan. The Russian IATA code for Tokmok Airport is ТКМ.

Tokmok Airport started its operations in the 1950s as a reserve landing strip where aircraft were diverted from the then Frunze Airport during bad weather conditions. The current runway and terminal were built in the 1970s. The airport has no instrument landing facilities and operates only during daylight hours.

Tokmok Airport is currently not in use by commercial airlines. However, it still serves as a reserve airport in Chuy Valley.
