= Karakol International Airport =

Karakol International Airport Каракол эл аралык аэропорту

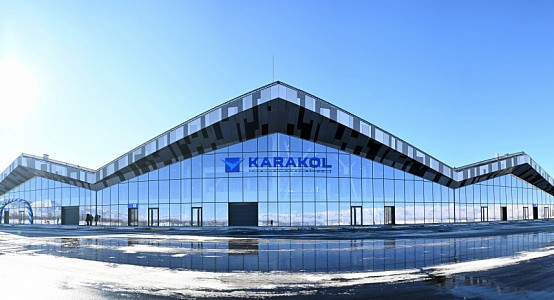
- IATA: IKG; ICAO: UCFP

Summary
- Airport type: Public
- Owner: JSC Airports of Kyrgyzstan
- Operator: Government
- Serves: Karakol
- Location: Karakol, Issyk-Kul Region, Kyrgyzstan
- Focus city for: Asman Airlines
- Elevation AMSL: 5,590 ft (1,700 m)
- Coordinates: 42°30′29″N 078°24′28″E
- Website: http://www.airport.kg/karakol

Map
- Location within Kyrgyzstan

Runways
Direction	Length		Surface
Direction	m	ft	Surface
10/28	3,750	6,562	Asphalt

Karakol International Airport (Kyrgyz: Каракол эл аралык аэропорту) (IATA: IKG, ICAO: UCFP) is an international airport serving Karakol, the capital of Issyk-Kul Province (oblast) of Kyrgyzstan. The Russian IATA code for Karakol International Airport is КПЖ.

Karakol International Airport is one of the five international airports that are part of Manas International Airport LLC. It is located 2.5 km northeast of the city of Karakol.

== Overview ==
Formerly known as Przhevalsk Airport until 1992, Karakol International Airport started its operations in 1940s. The current runway and terminal were built in 1978. On 30 November 2011, the Kyrgyz Government signed a decree and awarded an international status to the airport. Thus, it became Karakol International Airport.

On 2 December 2011, the first international flight landed at Karakol International Airport. SCAT's Antonov AN-24 from Almaty, Kazakhstan, was also the first scheduled flight since 1991 when the airport suffered a decline in passenger numbers. Until 1991, Karakol had regular links with Bishkek, Jalal-Abad, Osh and other towns in Kyrgyzstan.

It is a class 3C airport, meaning that it has no instrument landing facilities and operates only during daylight hours.

On November 25, 2011, Karakol Airport was granted international status.

Karakol International Airport has customs and border control checks and serves both domestic and international flights. There are plans to starts flights to Bishkek, Jalal-Abad, Osh in Kyrgyzstan as well as Omsk and Novosibirsk in Russia.

=== Reconstruction ===
On May 7, 2022, Kyrgyzstan’s President Sadyr Japarov set the timeline for the reconstruction of the airport, after which construction works were initiated by the Manas International Airport LLC. The reconstruction involved the extension of the runway and the construction of a new terminal building.

On December 11, 2024, President Sadyr Japarov attended the opening of the newly reconstructed Karakol International Airport in Issyk-Kul region. It is officially named Karakol International Airport Issyk-Kul branch of JSC Manas International Airport. The airport, capable of servicing 250 passengers per hour, is expected to enhance regional connectivity, tourism, and Kyrgyzstan’s international profile. The reconstructed Karakol International Airport features a 2,450-meter runway that meets Class 3C standards. The airport can now accommodate modern aircraft, including Q400, Embraer 190, and RJ 85. Future plans include extending the runway to 3,500 meters, allowing for larger aircraft and expanding the airport’s international flight capabilities.

From December 19, 2024, Asman Airlines has launched twice-weekly regular flights on the Karakol-Bishkek route.

On January 9, 2025, Asman Airlines operated its first flight on the Osh–Karakol–Osh route.

In February 2025, Karakol International Airport officially received the IKG code assigned by IATA.

On August 10, 2026, Karakol International Airport completed a major infrastructure modernization, marked by a technical flight of an Airbus A320 operated by Avia Traffic Company. The runway was extended from 2,450 meters to 3,750 meters and equipped with modern lighting systems and an instrument landing system. These upgrades allow the airport to handle mainline aircraft such as the Airbus A320 and Boeing 737 families, expanding beyond its former limits of regional aircraft (e.g., Dash 8 Q400) and business jets.

== Airlines and destinations ==
Airlines	Destinations
Asman Airlines	Bishkek, Osh
