= Tamga Airport =

Tamga Airport Тамга аэропорту
- IATA: none (ТМГ); ICAO: UAFA

Summary
- Airport type: Public
- Operator: Government
- Serves: Jeti-Ögüz District
- Location: Jeti-Ögüz District, Issyk-Kul Region
- Hub for: Golden Rule Airlines
- Elevation AMSL: 5,655 ft / 1,724 m
- Coordinates: 42°09′11″N 077°33′50″E

Map

Runways
Direction	Length		Surface
Direction	m	ft	Surface
18/36	850	2,788	Asphalt

Tamga Airport (Kyrgyz: Тамга аэропорту, Russian: Тамгинский аэропорт) (IATA: none (ТМГ), ICAO: UAFA) is a small airport serving Jeti-Ögüz District in Issyk-Kul Region (oblast) of Kyrgyzstan. The Russian IATA code for the airport is ТМГ.

Tamga Airport started its operations in the 1930s as a reserve landing strip on the southern shore of Issyk-Kul Lake. The current runway and terminal were built in the 1960s. The runway can only accept AN-2 and AN-28 planes and their analogues, has no instrument landing facilities, and operates only during daylight hours.

The airport is currently used for agricultural purposes, although there are plans to renovate it as the number of tourists to the southern shore of Issyk-Kul Lake is set to increase. Until 1990, Tamga had regular links with Bishkek, Osh, and Jalal-Abad.
