= Kerben Airport =

Coordinates: 41°29′04″N 071°44′01″E

Kerben Airport Кербен аэропорту

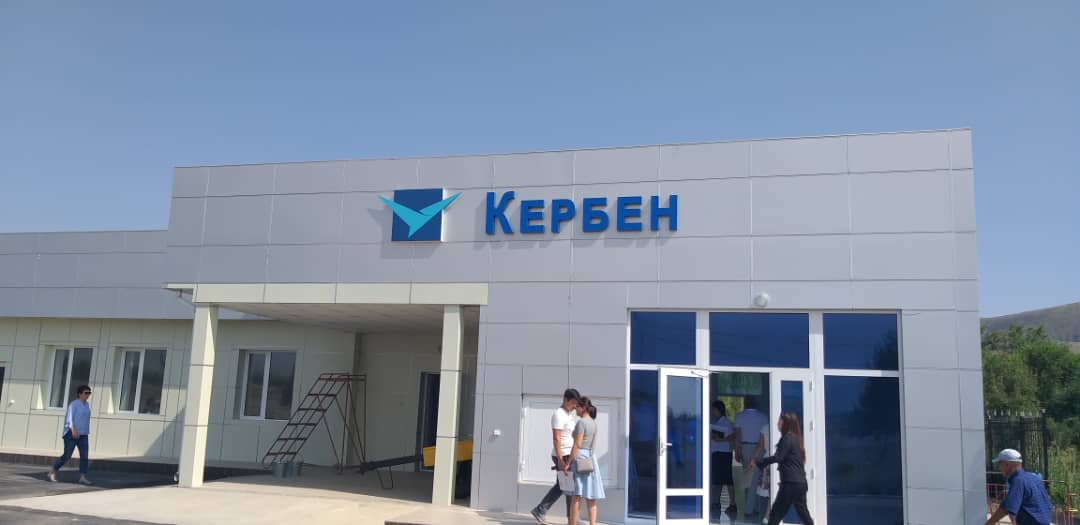
- IATA: none (КРФ); ICAO: UAFE

Summary
- Airport type: Public
- Operator: Government
- Serves: Kerben
- Location: Kerben, Aksy District
- Hub for: TezJet Airlines
- Elevation AMSL: 4,199 ft / 1,280 m

Map

Runways
Direction	Length		Surface
Direction	m	ft	Surface
04/22	1,740	5,708	Asphalt

Kerben Airport (Kyrgyz: Кербен аэропорту, Russian: Кербенский аэропорт) (IATA: none (КРФ), ICAO: UAFE) is an airport serving Kerben, a town in Aksy District of Jalal-Abad Region (oblast) of Kyrgyzstan. Until 1992, Kerben Airport was called Karavan (Caravan) Airport. The Russian IATA code for Kerben Airport is КРФ.

== Operations ==
Kerben Airport started its operations in 1950s as a landing strip in the then Karavan. The current runway and terminal were built in 1982. It is a regional class 3C airport. The runway has a weight limit of 22 tonnes, and has no instrument landing facilities and operates only during daylight hours.

Although, Kerben Airport is near the border with Uzbekistan, it has no customs and border control checks and serves only flights within Kyrgyzstan. Up until 2010, the airport had year-round links with Jalal-Abad, Bishkek and Osh. Flights to the capital city Bishkek and the provincial centre Jalal-Abad resumed on 1 March 2013.

== Airlines and destinations ==
Airlines	Destinations
Asman Airlines	Bishkek
