= Batken Airport =

Airport in Batken, Kyrgyzstan

Coordinates: 40°02′33″N 070°50′17″E

Batken International Airport Баткен эл аралык аэропорту
- IATA: none (БАТ); ICAO: UAFB

Summary
- Airport type: Public
- Operator: Government
- Serves: Batken
- Location: Batken, Kyrgyzstan
- Elevation AMSL: 3,517 ft (1,072 m)

Map
- Location within Kyrgyzstan

Runways
Direction	Length		Surface
Direction	m	ft	Surface
14/32	1,800	5,905	Asphalt

Batken International Airport (Kyrgyz: Баткен эл аралык аэропорту, Russian: Баткенский международный аэропорт) (IATA: none (БАТ), ICAO: UAFB) is an international airport serving Batken, the capital of Batken Province (oblast) of Kyrgyzstan. The Russian IATA code for Batken Airport is БАТ.

Batken International Airport commenced its operations in 1958 as a basic landing strip. In 1984, significant development took place, resulting in the construction of the present-day runway and terminal facilities. The airport is classified as a Class 3C airport, with its runway featuring a weight limit of 22 tonnes. Batken International Airport lacks instrument landing facilities, which means it can only operate during daylight hours.

Batken Airport was given international status on April 19, 2014. Customs and border control checks will be installed and the current runway will be extended by 400 meters. There are occasional flights to Osh, Jalal-Abad and even to nearby Isfana.

== Airlines and destinations ==
Airlines	Destinations
Asman Airlines	Bishkek, Tamchy
