= Talas Airport =

Talas Airport Талас аэропорту
- IATA: none (ТЛС); ICAO: UAFT

Summary
- Airport type: Public
- Owner: OJSC Airports of Kyrgyzstan
- Operator: Government
- Serves: Talas
- Location: Talas, Kyrgyzstan
- Elevation AMSL: 4,153 ft (1,266 m)
- Coordinates: 42°30′21″N 072°15′47″E

Map
- Location within Kyrgyzstan

Runways
Direction	Length		Surface
Direction	m	ft	Surface
10/28	1,700	5,577	Asphalt

Talas Airport (Kyrgyz: Талас аэропорту, Russian: Таласский аэропорт) (IATA: none (ТЛС), ICAO: UAFT) is an airport serving Talas, the capital of Talas Province (oblast) of Kyrgyzstan. The Russian code for Talas Airport is ТЛС.

== History ==
Talas Airport started its operations in 1940s as a landing strip outside the then small provincial town. The current runway and terminal were built in 1979. It is a regional class 3C airport. The runway has a weight limit of 22 tonnes, and has no instrument landing facilities and operates only during daylight hours.

Talas Airport has no customs and border control checks and serves only flights within Kyrgyzstan. Until 1997, Talas had year-round regular links with Bishkek, Osh and Jalal-Abad. The airport did not function after the collapse of the Soviet Union, and the runway was subsequently closed due to the need for complete reconstruction and the obsolescence of the airfield's artificial surfaces.

=== New terminal (2024) ===
The capsule for the construction of a new airport building was laid on June 15, 2023.

In May 2024, a new airport terminal was opened with a capacity of 100 people per hour. The runway was modernized.

== Facilities ==
The arrival and departure halls of the airport terminal are separated from each other, fully equipped for people with disabilities, with all amenities for passengers, and there is also a mother and child room.

=== Runway ===
The runway is capable of receiving all types of aircraft and helicopters, such as An-2, An-26, An-28, British Aerospace 146/Avro RJ-85, Yak-40.

== Airlines and destinations ==
=== Passenger ===
Airlines	Destinations
Asman Airlines	Bishkek

== Accidents ==
On June 28, 1969, an Aeroflot Ilyushin Il-14 (CCCP-91495) flight to Frunze took off from Talas Airport at 19:36 with 35 passengers and five crew members aboard. After take-off, the crew executed a right turn towards the mountains instead of the procedure left turn. Ilyushin Il-14 collided with a mountain at an altitude of 3150 m (1884 m above the runway elevation) at 8.7 km to the left of the runway. At 19:50, the plane struck a mountain, 39 km from Talas Airport, and was completely destroyed. All passengers and crew were killed. At the time, it was the worst accident in Kyrgyz aviation and remains the second worst. It was also the worst accident at the time involving Ilyushin Il-14.
