= Issyk-Kul International Airport =

Issyk-Kul International Airport Ысык-Көл эл аралык аэропорту

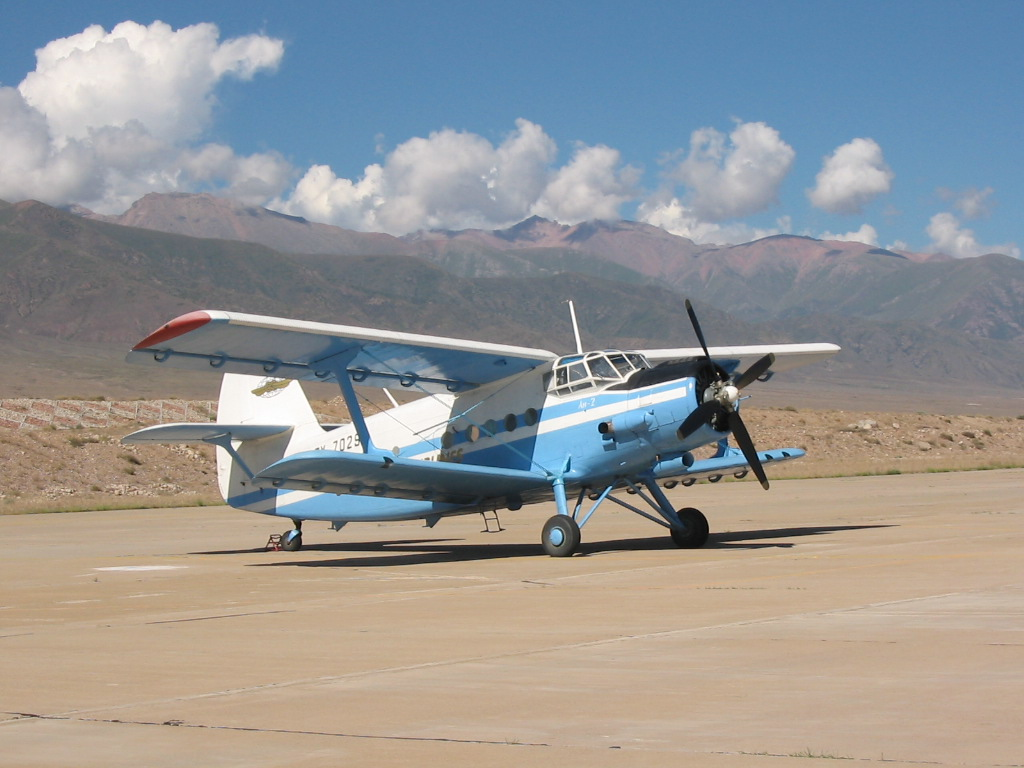
- IATA: IKU (ИКУ); ICAO: UCFL

Summary
- Airport type: Public
- Operator: Government
- Serves: Tamchy
- Location: Tamchy, Kyrgyzstan
- Hub for: Kyrgyzstan Air Company
- Elevation AMSL: 5,426 ft (1,654 m)
- Coordinates: 42°35′8″N 76°42′25″E

Map
- Location within Kyrgyzstan

Runways
Direction	Length		Surface
Direction	m	ft	Surface
07/25	3,800	12,467	Asphalt

Issyk-Kul International Airport (Kyrgyz: Ысык-Көл эл аралык аэропорту, Isıq-Köl el aralıq aeroportu, ىسىق-كۅل ەل ارالىق اەروپورتۇ; Russian: Международный аэропорт «Иссык-Куль», Meždunarodnyj aeroport «Issyk-Kulj») (IATA: IKU (ИКУ), ICAO: UCFL) is an international airport near Tamchy, a village in Issyk Kul District of Issyk Kul Region (oblast) of Kyrgyzstan. The Russian IATA code for Issyk-Kul International Airport is ИКУ.

== Operations ==
Formerly known as Tamchy Airport, Issyk-Kul International Airport started its operations in 1975 as a reserve airport for the nearby Cholpon-Ata Airport. The current runway and terminal were built in 2003. In the same year, the Kyrgyz Government renamed Tamchy Airport to Issyk-Kul International Airport. It is a class 4D airport with CAT I instrument landing facilities and lighting on both the runway and stands for night operation.

Issyk-Kul International Airport has customs and border control checks and serves both domestic and international flights. There are plans to extend the runway by a further 500 m.

Renovated in 2016, the airport was equipped with new, state-of-the-art lighting equipment, an instrument landing system (ILS), and meteorological equipment. The power supply system was modernized, the terminal building was reconstructed, and the runway was extended. It was approved for 24-hour operation on August 29, 2016.

== Airlines and destinations ==
Airlines	Destinations
Aeroflot	Moscow–Sheremetyevo
Asman Airlines	Tashkent, Almaty, Osh, Batken
Centrum Air	Seasonal: Tashkent
FlyArystan	Seasonal: Almaty
S7 Airlines	Seasonal: Novosibirsk
Silk Avia	Seasonal: Tashkent
Sky FRU	Osh
