= Kazarman Airport =

Coordinates: 41°24′37″N 074°02′39″E

Kazarman Airport Казарман аэропорту

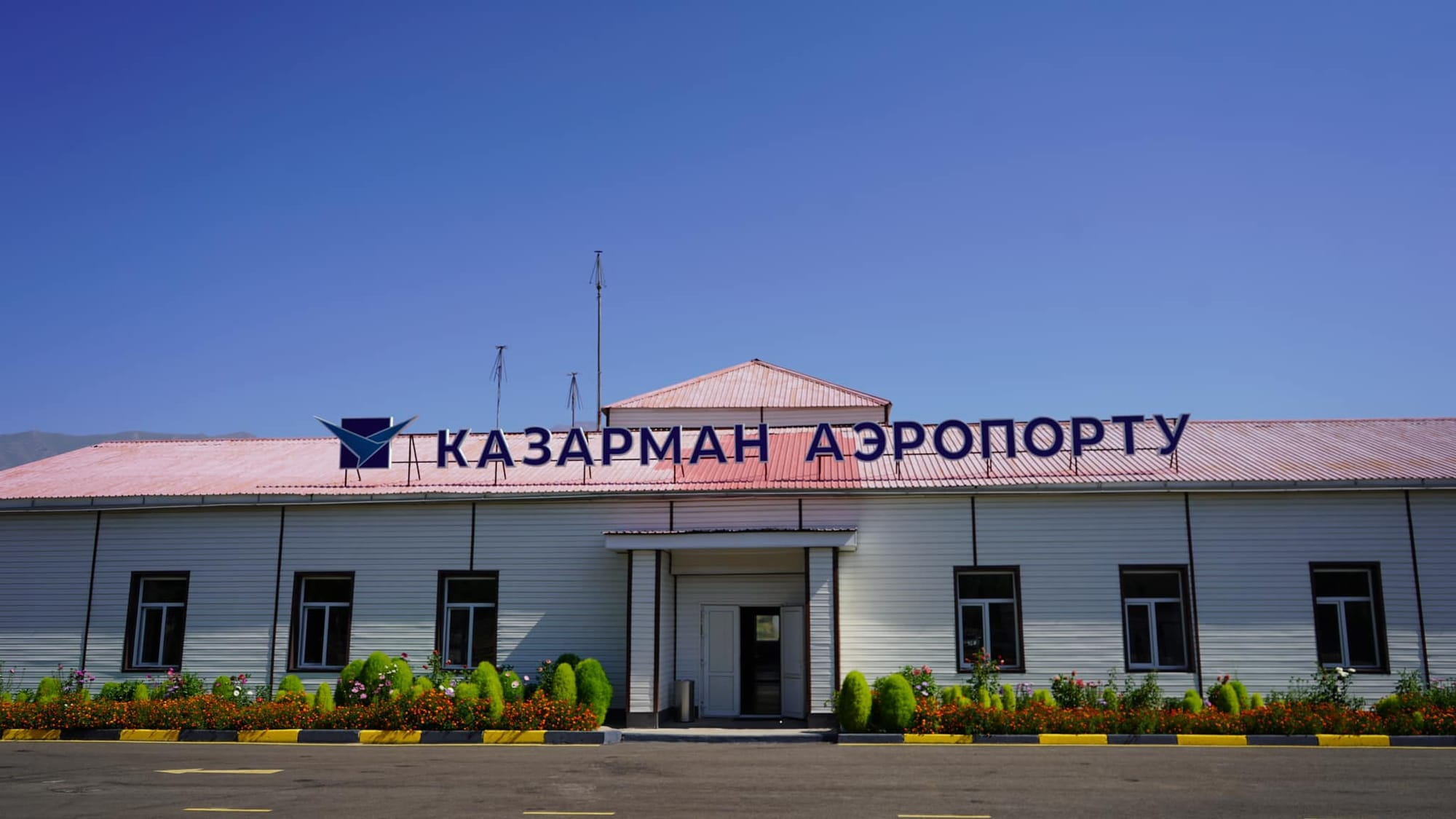
- IATA: none (КЗМ); ICAO: UAFZ

Summary
- Airport type: Public
- Owner: OJSC Airports of Kyrgyzstan
- Operator: Government
- Serves: Kazarman
- Location: Kazarman, Kyrgyzstan
- Hub for: TezJet Airlines
- Elevation AMSL: 4,289 ft (1,307 m)

Map
- Location within Kyrgyzstan

Runways
Direction	Length		Surface
Direction	m	ft	Surface
11/29	1,840	6,036	Asphalt

Kazarman Airport (Kyrgyz: Казарман аэропорту, Russian: Казарманский аэропорт) (IATA: none (КЗМ), ICAO: UAFZ) is an airport serving Kazarman, a village in the Toguz-Toro District of Jalal-Abad Region (oblast), Kyrgyzstan. The Russian IATA code for Kazarman Airport is КЗМ.

The mountainous Kazarman Airport is located on the northeast outskirts of the settlement of Kazarman, 240 km from the city of Naryn. The airfield is situated at an altitude of 1,274 meters above sea level.

== Operations ==
Kazarman Airport started operations in the 1940s as a landing strip on the outskirts of the gold-mining village. The current runway and terminal were built in 1985. It is a regional class 3C airport. The runway has a weight limit of 22 tonnes, and has no instrument-landing facilities and operates only during daylight hours.

Kazarman Airport has no customs and border control checks and only serves flights within Kyrgyzstan. Until 2000, the airport had year-round links with Jalal-Abad, Naryn, Bishkek and Osh.

Kazarman Airport resumed operations for the reception of aircraft on June 16, 2008, following the launch of a regular flight route from Bishkek to Kazarman and back. For the past ten years, it has not received any aircraft due to a lack of air traffic volume. The flights were operated by Kyrgyzstan Airlines once a week.

Flights to Jalal-Abad, Osh and Bishkek resumed on April 24, 2013.

In 2018, renovation works were carried out on the terminal building. The terminal's capacity is 40-50 passengers per hour.

The Kazarman Airport has been undergoing reconstruction since 2022, where repair and restoration works are currently being carried out on the asphalt concrete surface, runway, taxiway, and parking areas of the airport airfield.

In August 2025, Kazarman Airport in Jalal-Abad Region resumed operations after more than 20 years of inactivity. The state-owned company Airports of Kyrgyzstan carried out major reconstruction, including repairs of the runway, taxiways, parking areas, and the terminal building.

== Runway ==
The airfield is designed for the operation of aircraft such as Yak-40, An-24, An-26, An-2, An-28, and lower-class aircraft without restrictions, as well as helicopters of all types. It operates during daylight hours. The artificial runway (ASR) measures 1840 x 35 meters and has an asphalt concrete surface.

== Accidents ==
- On June 29, 1983, an Aeroflot Yakovlev YAK-40 (CCCP-87808) crashed after encountering wind shear.

== Airlines and destinations ==
Airlines	Destinations
Asman Airlines	Bishkek
