= Äziret Sūltan International Airport =

International airport serving Türkistan, Kazakhstan

Hazrat Sultan International Airport Türkistan International Airport Halıqaralıq Əziret Sûltan Əwecayı (Kazakh)
- IATA: HSA; ICAO: UAIT; LID: ТРК

Summary
- Airport type: Public
- Serves: Türkistan, Kazakhstan
- Location: 16 km (9.9 mi) NE of Türkistan, Türkistan Region, Kazakhstan
- Opened: 28 September 2020 (6 years ago)
- Built: 2019 — 2020
- Time zone: ALMT (UTC+06:00)
- Elevation AMSL: 989 ft (301 m)
- Coordinates: 43°18′40″N 068°33′01″E

Maps
- Location of the airport in Kazakhstan HSA/UACK (West and Central Asia)
- Interactive map of Hazrat Sultan International Airport; Türkistan International Airport

Runways
Direction	Length		Surface
Direction	m	ft	Surface
05/23	3,300	10,827	Asphalt

Hazrat Sultan International Airport (HSIA) (Kazakh: Халықаралық Әзірет Сұлтан Әуежайы / Halyqaralyq Äzıret Sūltan Äuejaiy), commonly known as Türkistan International Airport (IATA: HSA, ICAO: UAIT), is a new greenfield international airport that serves the city of Türkistan (as a replacement for the old Türkistan Airport). The airport is located near the village of Shaga, 16 km (9.9 mi) NE of the centre of Türkistan, the capital of the Türkistan Region (formerly known as South Kazakhstan Region), in the southernmost part of Kazakhstan.

The construction of the airport started in May 2019, and was completed after one year in 2020 with a cost of around US$160 million. The new airport was constructed within the framework of a PPP (Public-Private Partnership) model between Turkish YDA Holding and the Kazakh Government and is compliant with all international standards and implemented using the latest building technologies.

It is the first greenfield airport to be developed in post-communist Kazakhstan, and the 19th commercial airport in the country. The opening ceremony of the new airport took place on the planned date of 28 September 2020. However, the airport was put into operation and ready for deployment in January 2021. Hazrat Sultan International Airport construction can be considered as the fastest airport facility construction in the world. The airport's IATA code, HSA, is derived from the airport's abbreviated name of "Hazrat Sultan Airport".

== History ==
=== Naming ===
During much of the planning and construction phase the new airport was known as Türkıstan International Airport. However, it was later reported that the new airport will be named after «Hazrat Sultan» (meaning Holy Sultan in Kazakh) — which is one of the epithets of Sufi sheikh Khawaja Ahmed Yasawi, author of Divan-i hikmet (“Book of Wisdom”), whose mausoleum is located in Türkıstan.

=== Construction ===
The airport was constructed as a replacement for the former Türkıstan Airport that is located to the east of the city. Construction work on HSIA airport began in May 2019, and was finalized in 2020, making it the fastest-constructed airport facility in the world.

=== Expected airlines and destinations ===
The first services to operate from the airport was launched by Kazakhstan's carriers to Astana and Almaty and later to other regions of Kazakhstan. Turkish Airlines also plans to launch three to four times weekly Istanbul service in the initial stages, with a possibility of increasing frequency in the future. It is also planned to launch direct flights between Türkıstan and the holy city of Mecca (Makkah) once every two days. Hazrat Sultan International Airport joined Kazakhstan's eleven airports that operate under the open skies aviation regime. The regime, which has been in effect since November 2019, removes restrictions on a number of flights and gives a provision of fifth-degree freedom to foreign airlines

== Facilities ==
The airport site is spread over 905 hectares (2,240 acres).

=== Passenger main terminal ===
The passenger terminal is capable to handle up to three million passengers annually or has a capacity of 450 passengers per hour, and is equipped with a gallery landing with two gates to air-bridges and seven gates to apron buses.

=== Runway ===
The airport resides at an elevation of 301 metres (988 ft) above mean sea level.

Runway at Hazrat Sultan International Airport
Direction	Length	Width	Surface	Operational Years	Usage	ILS	Notes
05/23	10,827 ft 3,300 m	149 ft 45 m	Asphalt	2020 - Current	Primary runway	Cat. I (both directions)	The new extended runway is 3,300 metres long, with supporting taxiway systems. The runway is equipped with a two-layer gravel mixture and a single-layer gravel steering strip.

== Airlines and destinations ==
=== Passenger ===
Airlines	Destinations
FlyArystan	Almaty, Astana
Jazeera Airways	Kuwait City
SCAT Airlines	Aqtau, Aqtöbe, Bukhara, Oral, Samarqand, Urgench
Silk Avia	Samarqand
Turkish Airlines	Istanbul
Vietjet Qazaqstan	Aqtöbe, Astana, Qostanai, Samarqand

=== Cargo ===
Airlines	Destinations
Turkish Cargo	Istanbul, Macau

== See also ==
- Transport in Kazakhstan
- List of airports in Kazakhstan
