= Nursultan Nazarbayev International Airport =

Second-busiest airport in Kazakhstan

Nursultan Nazarbayev International Airport Халықаралық Нұрсұлтан Назарбаев Әуежайы

- Exterior of Nursultan Nazarbayev International Airport, 26 September 2021
- IATA: NQZ; ICAO: UACC; LID: АКЛ; WMO: 35188

Summary
- Airport type: Public
- Owner: Ministry of Industry and Infrastructure Development
- Operator: JSC "Nursultan Nazarbayev International Airport"
- Serves: City of Qosshy in Akmola Region and Astana
- Location: Esil District, Left Bank, Astana (inside city limits), Kazakhstan
- Opened: 1931; 95 years ago
- Hub for: Air Astana
- Focus city for: FlyArystan
- Operating base for: SCAT Airlines; VietJet Qazaqstan
- Built: 2000–2005
- Time zone: Kazakhstan Time (UTC+05:00)
- Elevation AMSL: 355 m (1,165 ft)
- Coordinates: 51°01′19″N 071°28′01″E
- Website: nn-airport.kz

Maps
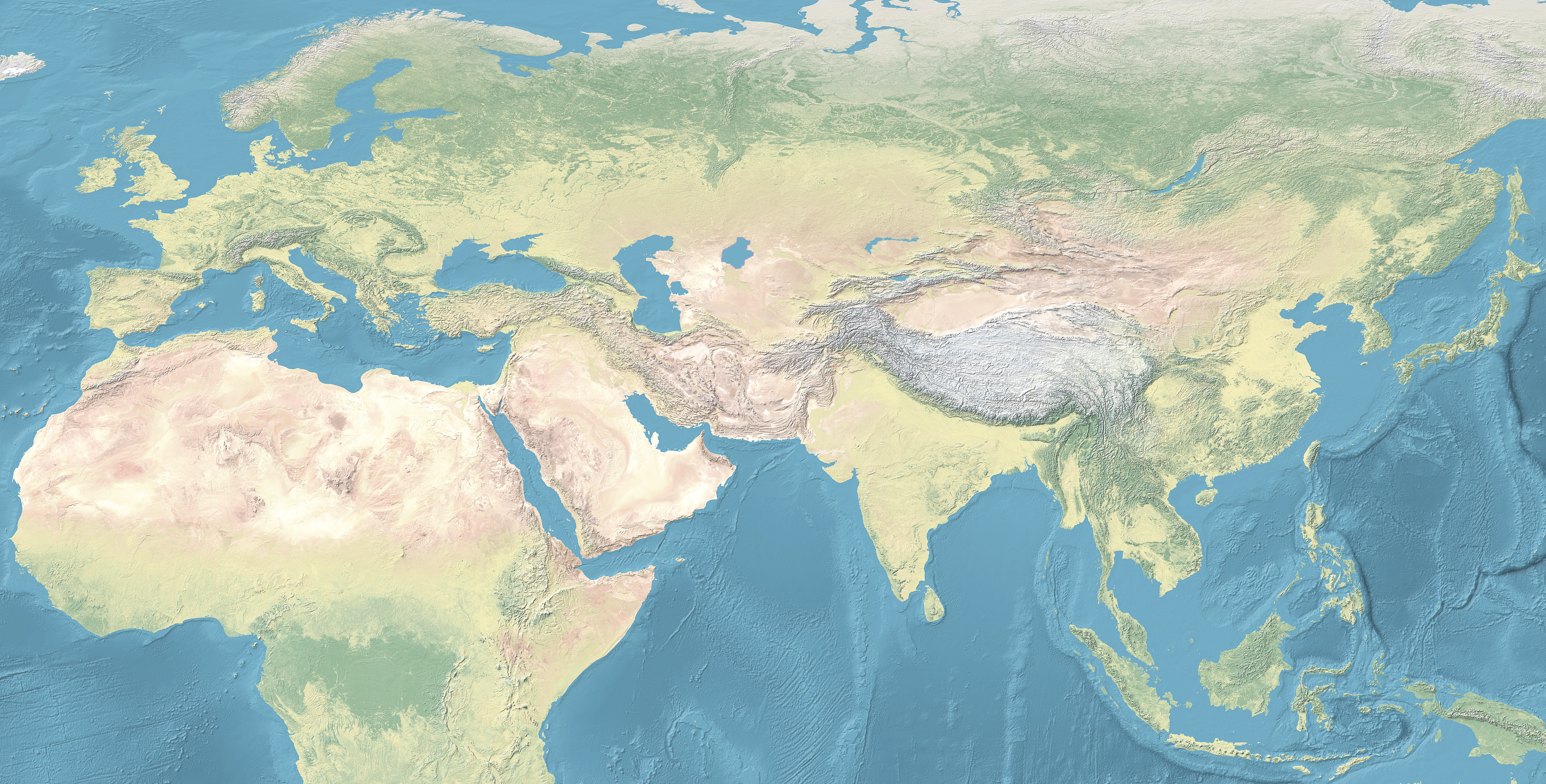
- Location in Esil District, Astana, Kazakhstan NQZ (Asia) NQZ (Eurasia)
- Interactive map of Nursultan Nazarbayev International Airport

Runways
Direction	Length		Surface
Direction	m	ft	Surface
04/22	3,500	11,483	Asphalt/concrete

Statistics (2024)
- Passengers: ▲8,315,108
- Passenger change 23-24: ▲10,18%
- Ranking in Kazakhstan: 2nd
- Cargo: 41,233 tons (2019)
- Sources: Airport statistics AIP Kazakhstan

Nursultan Nazarbayev International Airport (Note: Kazakh: Халықаралық Нұрсұлтан Назарбаев Әуежайы, romanized: Xalıqaralıq Nursultan Nazarbaev Äwejayı, pronounced [χɑɫəq(χ)ɑrɑˈɫəq nʊrsʊɫˈtɑn nɑzɑrˈbɑjɪf æɥeʒɑˈjə]; Russian: Международный аэропорт имени Нурсултана Назарбаева, romanized: Mezhdunarodnyy aeroport imeni Nursultana Nazarbaeva.) (IATA: NQZ, ICAO: UACC), alternatively referred by its previous name as Astana International Airport until 2017 (or simply Astana Airport), is the international airport serving Astana, Kazakhstan, the capital and second most populous city in the country. It is the primary aviation hub for northern Kazakhstan. Regionally, it stands as the third-busiest international air passenger gateway into Central Asia (after Almaty International Airport (ALA) and Islam Karimov Tashkent International Airport in Uzbekistan). The airport is also the second-busiest airport in Kazakhstan and the 9th busiest in the Post-Soviet states in terms of total passenger traffic, air traffic movements and total cargo handled, with 8,315,108 passengers served in 2024 (10,18% year over year increase). On average, the airport handles more than 200 departures a day.

It is located in the Esil administrative subdivision of Astana, 6.5 nautical miles (12.0 km; 7.5 mi) south-east of the city centre. The airport features two passenger terminals and single runway along with cargo and maintenance facilities. The airport's passenger domestic terminal (T2; 2000–05) is a well-known landmark designed by the late Japanese architect Kisho Kurokawa, who also designed the original terminal at Kuala Lumpur International Airport.

It serves as the secondary large hub for the national flag carrier of Kazakhstan – Air Astana, including its low-cost subsidiary – FlyArystan, the homebase for VietJet Qazaqstan, and is the primary operating base for SCAT Airlines and was also formerly a hub for Starlines Kazakhstan and Tselinograd OAO. The airport is operated by state-owned JSC "Nursultan Nazarbayev International Airport" which also operates Kokshetau Airport in Akmola Region.

The facility was established in 1930 and began operating as a public airport in 1931 as Akmolinsk Airport then, as the city changed its name, renamed as Tselinograd Airport and then as Astana International Airport. The airport was given its current name by the Kazakhstan government in June 2017, in honour of former President of Kazakhstan (1990 – 2019) Nursultan Nazarbayev, under whose presidency it was constructed and inaugurated. On 8 June 2020 the airport officially changed its three-character IATA airport code from TSE to NQZ. It has been recognised as the 'Best Regional Airport in Central Asia and CIS' at the Skytrax World Airport Awards 2022. The airport provides year-round non-stop flights to airports throughout Kazakhstan and to Central Asia, the Middle East, the Caucasus, Europe, Russia, and China.

== Location ==
Nursultan Nazarbayev International Airport is 6.5 NM (12.0 km; 7.5 mi) south-east of Astana city centre. It is bordered by the village of Kyzylsuat to the west, Maybalyk lake to the north, and the city of Qosshy in Akmola Region to the east.

Management of the airport lies solely on the authority of state-owned JSC "Nursultan Nazarbayev International Airport" (formerly JSC "Astana International Airport"), which also directly manages Kokshetau Airport (located in Akmola Region 287 km (178 mi) from Astana). Previously, the Astana Airport was operated by Malaysia Airports Holdings Berhad ("MAHB") under the Trust Deed.

== History ==
=== Establishment and early operational history ===
The airport was built in 1930, three kilometers from Akmolinsk (now Astana) within the area of today's modern architectural tower of Baiterek. There was a square field for aircraft take-off and landing, an adobe 8-room station with a small waiting hall, a two-room house for pilots, and fuel storage on the airport grounds. In December 1931, the first airfield of Astana was built on the outskirts of the town and was developed further after World War II. Regular air traffic was established between Semipalatinsk and Akmolinsk (day of enterprise establishment).

During times of flooding, the aerodrome was closed. Communication between the aerodrome and the city was by phone, ferry (there was no bridge over Ishim River), and footpath. In the first few years, the air traffic was ad-hoc by character, with loose timetables, such as "Aircraft departure on Monday morning" or "On Wednesday at sunrise". Transportation of passengers, mail, and cargo was carried out by Kalinin K-4, Kalinin K-5, Polikarpov R-5, Petlyakov Pe-2 aircraft. Regular flights were established in 1934, with the following routes: Alma-Ata – Karaganda – Akmolinsk – Atbasar – Kostanay – Sverdlovsk. Karaganda – Petropavlovsk – Korgalzhyn – Akmolinsk.

At the beginning of 1946, the first group of Polikarpov Po-2 aircraft arrived in Akmolinsk for regular service. The group belonged to a Karaganda aviation enterprise. The following routes were opened for passenger and mail transportation: Akmolinsk – Korgalzhyn – Aksu – Astrakhanka – Balkashino (settlements of Akmolinsk Region). The operations division was organized consisting of two people. In 1946, aviation began to render services for the national economy – medical aviation. From 1947 to 1948, a fleet of three Polikarpov Po-2 aircraft was formed at the Akmolinsk Airport base. This fleet was part of an air group that was based in Karaganda. The airport was equipped with modern equipment (for the time), construction development has started: a Finnish house for a radio station, three buildings and a garage were built. The total number of staff numbered 40 to 50 people. The airport began servicing heavier types of aircraft such as Lisunov Li-2 in addition to light aircraft.

=== 1960 to 2000 ===
On 16 October 1960 Akmolinsk Airport was upgraded to the status of a third-class airport. In 1960, Akmolinsk Airport received its first aircraft, the LI-2, and commenced regular flights along the routes of Akmolinsk – Stepnogorsk and Akmolinsk – Kustanai. On 4 November 1963 Tselinograd Airport (formerly known as Akmolinsk) accepted the first Ilyushin Il-18 aircraft in the new terminal, located 18 kilometers from the city.

In December 1963, Ilyushin Il-18 aircraft began to operate regular flights. The airport terminal was at a building stage, therefore the adapted two-story building served as the air terminal, where the air traffic control service had been located. In February 1966, the new air terminal was transferred into operation. In June of the same year, all services of United Aviagroup relocated to the new airport. By 1969, the aircraft park of Tselinograd aviagroup was replenished with the first Antonov An-24 aircraft. With the arrival of the Antonov An-24, the volume of passenger, mail, and cargo transportation sharply increased. People began to fly to many cities of the former Soviet Union. In 1975, the Tupolev Tu-154 first landed in the airport. After that, regular flights by Tupolev Tu-154 on the Alma-Ata – Tselinograd – Moscow route were started.

The historical mark for Akmola (Astana) aviators was the change of the capital in 1998. Airdrome reconstruction begun and finished in a relatively short time: the runway with artificial covering was extended for about 3500 meters; the taxiway and apron were also expanded by April 1998. Lighting systems and radio navigation equipment were replaced. The VIP building was constructed, and the airport complex was reconstructed (today known as Terminal 2). The final estimated cost of the project was ¥35.1 billion Japanese yen (JPY).

=== 2000 onwards ===
On 2 February 2005 a large-scale international airport reconstruction project was completed with the opening of the new 25,000 square-meter passenger terminal. The ceremonial opening of the international terminal was attended by the President of Kazakhstan, Nursultan Nazarbayev. The number of check-in counters was increased to 24 along with two luggage straps. Currently, the Terminal 2 is used to service domestic flights. On 28 November 2007, the airport welcomed its one millionth passenger. On 17 January 2008, the airport received the International Civil Aviation Organization category IIIA certification.

On 30 November 2012, Astana International Airport achieved a significant milestone by welcoming its two millionth passenger. On 19 November 2015, the 2,400 square-meter Business Aviation Terminal was opened. The BAT area has a 200-passenger per hour capacity. The airport is the secondary hub of Air Astana, the Republic of Kazakhstan's flag carrier, as well as FlyArystan, a low-cost airline established in 2018.

Within the framework of the Infrastructure Development Program, a new passenger terminal for international flights was built in 2017. A new terminal of 47,000 square meters adds six new aircraft parking lots with landing sleeves and four bus landing routes to the airport infrastructure and also includes a variety of technologies and processes designed to improve the quality of service at the airport. "N" stands for Nursultan Nazarbayev International Airport, as well as the name of the Kazakh capital of Astana. "QZ" is an acronym for Qazaqstan (Kazakhstan) according to the new version of Kazakh alphabet based on Latin script. On 1 July 2019 ePassenger software was introduced at Nursultan Nazarbayev Airport in terminals T1 and T2. On 29 November 2019 a transition gallery was opened at Nursultan Nazarbayev International Airport, connecting terminals T1 and T2 for international and domestic departures. Spanning 1000 square meters with a length of 90 meters, the gallery enables seamless movement between terminals without the need to exit onto the street. In 2020, the airport established itself as a prominent transit hub for humanitarian and cargo flights originating from Southeast Asia and heading towards Europe. On 30 July 2021 the airport launched its own mobile app called "NQZ." On 1 December 2021 Nursultan Nazarbayev International Airport celebrated its 90th anniversary.

=== Route development ===
In 1995, Transaero conducted its inaugural flight on the Astana-Moscow route, connecting the then-capital Akmola with the Russian capital. This marked the first instance of a foreign airline establishing air communication with the future capital of Kazakhstan. Transaero operated flights on this route until 15 December 2015, when it was succeeded by Russia's national carrier, Aeroflot. Aeroflot now operates 14 weekly flights to Astana. In September 1998, Austrian Airlines launched flights to its hub at Vienna International Airport (IATA: VIE). In March 2017, Austrian Airlines canceled its Vienna–Astana operations. In May 2002, Air Astana opened its first route to Almaty using Boeing 737. Now the airline is one of the largest operators at the airport. Turkish Airlines opened a connection to Istanbul on 19 October 2005. From 1 April 2024, the airline is operating Airbus A330-200/-300 on this route.

The first scheduled Lufthansa German Airlines's flight to Frankfurt began in 2006. Starting from 26 March 2006, Lufthansa has been offering three weekly intercontinental long-haul flights from Astana to Frankfurt Airport (IATA: FRA), the major business hub in Germany. These flights are operated using Airbus A340-300 aircraft, which is the largest commercial aircraft visiting Nursultan Nazarbayev International Airport regularly. The service resulted in partnership between Air Astana and Lufthansa.

In May 2009, Etihad Airways inaugurated nonstop service from Astana to Abu Dhabi International Airport, UAE. In October 2013, Air Astana inaugurated nonstop intercontinental service from Astana to London's Heathrow Airport (IATA: LHR), United Kingdom aboard a Boeing 757. In March 2015, Air Astana inaugurated thrice weekly nonstop service from Astana to Charles de Gaulle Airport (IATA: CDG) in Paris. Asiana Airlines' maiden flight using Airbus A330-300 aircraft from Seoul–Incheon touched down in August 2015. The airport previously had service to Sharjah provided by Air Arabia, which withdrew from Astana in March 2016. On 3 May 2016, KLM Royal Dutch Airlines launched twice weekly intercontinental long-haul flights to its hub at Amsterdam Airport Schiphol (IATA: AMS) using Airbus A330-200 aircraft. In 2017, Asiana Airlines and KLM ceased their Astana operations. On 20 June 2017, Finnair launched a short-haul twice weekly flights to its hub at Helsinki-Vantaa Airport using Airbus A319 aircraft. A year after, Finnair canceled its service to Astana.

The first of Hungarian-based Wizz Air flight from the airport took place in 2017, using a single 186-seat Airbus A320 aircraft destined for Budapest. The service was one of the first to Hungary. Also in 2017, Air China and LOT Polish Airlines began services by announcing routes to Beijing and Warsaw respectively. The airport has received occasional visits by the Boeing 787 Dreamliner. In 2019, FlyArystan became the first major low-cost airline to establish a hub at the airport. In 2019, SCAT Airlines made the first direct flights from Astana to Prague, Tokyo, and Ulaanbaatar but discontinued services in 2020. On 5 December 2022, AJet launched twice weekly flights to its hub at Ankara using Boeing 737 aircraft. Recently, more flights have been added to traffic between Kazakhstan and Turkey. In March 2023, Azerbaijan Airlines (AZAL) introduced a short-haul flight from Astana to Baku.

== Facilities ==
The airport is the primary hub of Air Astana and is a primary operating base for SCAT Airlines, low-cost carrier FlyArystan, and VietJet Qazaqstan. It has two passenger terminals (T1 and T2), a business aviation terminal as well as cargo and maintenance facilities. In 2019, it served 5,099,391 passengers, an increase of 12.1% compared to 2018, making it the second-busiest airport in Kazakhstan. The busiest destination in passenger numbers is Almaty.

=== Runway ===
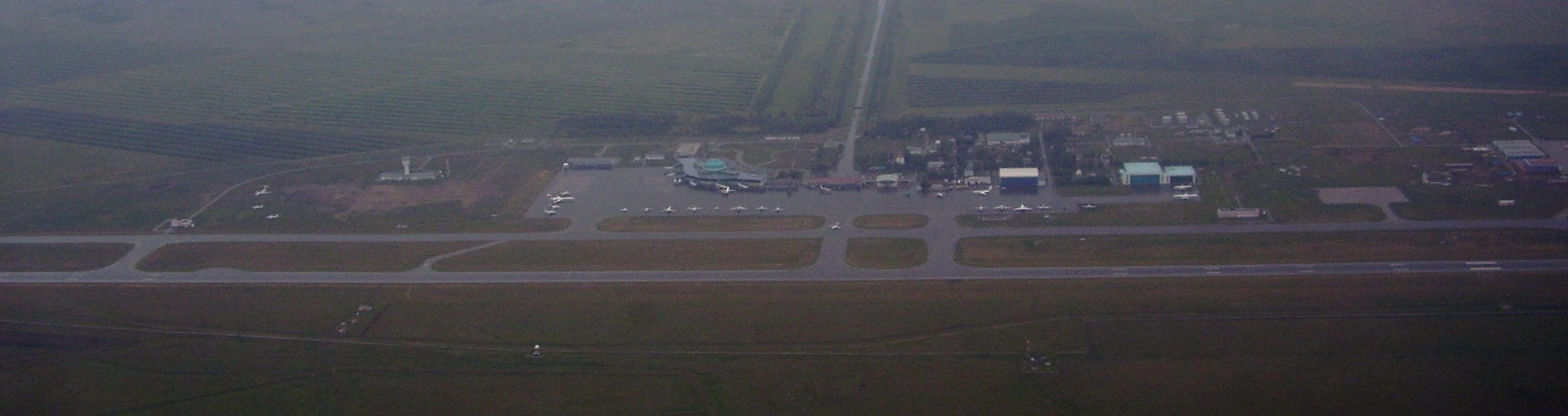
Aerial view of NQZ's runway 04/22 in 2007, when Terminal 1 was not yet operational

The airport resides at an elevation of 355 m (1,165 ft) above mean sea level. The airport has a single active runway in use, running roughly east to west and designated 04/22 with an asphalt/concrete surface measuring 3,500 m × 45 m (11,483 ft × 148 ft). The airport is equipped with an Instrument Landing System (ILS) rated to a Category IIIA (both directions), allowing the airport to guide landing aircraft safely under very poor weather conditions and also allowing planes to land in low visibility conditions, such as fog, supplied and installed by Siemens AG. The runway is also equipped with VOR/DME.

All the airport facilities lie to the north of the runway. The airport is able to accommodate and was designed to handle not only large passenger aircraft such as the Boeing 747-400 and the Airbus A340 but also large-capacity wide-body aircraft (Il-76, Antonov An-124 Ruslan, Boeing 787 Dreamliner and Boeing 747-400F).

It can also accept light aircraft and helicopters of all types.

Runway at Nursultan Nazarbayev International Airport
Direction	Length in m (ft)	Width in m (ft)	Surface	Operational years	Last major improvement	Usage	ILS	Notes	Alignment
04/22	11,483 ft 3,500 m	149 ft 45 m	Concrete/Asphalt	1931 - current	April 1998 and 2015	Primary runway	Cat. IIIA (both directions)	Third-longest commercial runway in Kazakhstan (the longest is a 14,764-foot (4,500 m) runway, and the second longest is a 14,436-foot (4,400 m) runway, both at Almaty International Airport). The runway is 3,500 metres long, with supporting taxiway systems. The runway is dedicated for arrivals and departures.	East–west

=== Second runway ===
It has been proposed to build a second runway in the airport. It would likely run parallel to the existing runway, significantly extending the total area occupied by the airport.

== Passenger terminals ==
=== Overview ===
Passenger terminals
Terminal	Date of opening	Floor area	Handling capacity	Parking bays
T1 – international terminal	31 May 2017; 9 years ago	47,000 m^{2} (510,000 sq ft)	5,200,000 passengers per year	6 (aerobridge); 4 (remote)
T2 – domestic terminal	2 February 2005; 21 years ago	23,892 m^{2} (257,170 sq ft)	3,700,000 passengers per year	6 (aerobridge); 4 (remote)
Total	1 December 1931; 94 years ago	70,892 m^{2} (763,080 sq ft)	8,900,000 passengers per year	12 (aerobridge); 92 (remote)

Nursultan Nazarbayev International Airport has two operational passenger terminals, numbered T1 and T2. Terminal 1 is used for international flights and Terminal 2 for domestic flights. The opening of Terminal 1 in 2017 has raised the airport's capacity to almost 9 million passengers per year. Air Astana, FlyArystan, SCAT Airlines and VietJet Qazaqstan have their presence in every terminal at NQZ. Other domestic airlines operate out of Terminal 2, while overseas carriers operate out of Terminal 1. Both terminals have shops and restaurants, and all areas are accessible to disabled passengers. Nursultan Nazarbayev International Airport has 20 gates (12 jet-way gates and 8 hard stands) in two terminals.

=== T1 – international terminal ===
Construction of Terminal 1 started in January 2015, as part of the EXPO 2017 Astana program. The new international terminal (styled as "T1") was inaugurated by Nursultan Nazarbayev in May 2017 and opened in June 2017. It is dedicated exclusively to international operations. The inaugural international flight was an Aeroflot flight to Sheremetyevo International Airport (SVO) in Moscow. It is the larger of the two passenger terminals at the airport and is able to handle 5.2 million passengers a year. Plans for the new terminal show 5–6 new departure gates complementing the gates in the previously existing terminal building. The construction project cost more than 240 million dollars. 47,000 sq. M. and completed construction in time for the EXPO 2017, and took the role of T1 – International Terminal. The new terminal adds 6 new aircraft parking lots with landing sleeves (Gates A1-A6) and 4 bus landing routes to the Airport infrastructure, and also includes a variety of technologies and processes designed to improve the quality of service at the Airport. The new terminal has a public catering area of 1,000 square meters, retail outlets occupy 1,300 square meters. The terminal was constructed by Swiss-Albanian firm Mabco Construction.

On 20 April 2018 Nursultan Nazarbayev Airport opened a duty-free store in Terminal 1's baggage claim area. The Border Service of the National Security Committee of the Republic of Kazakhstan maintain control points for arriving and departing passengers. There are 42 cabins of passport control, flight information display systems and a luggage system of EVRO 2020 standard, ensuring the passage of 1200 pieces of luggage per hour. Terminal 1 has a gate capable of accommodating an Airbus A380, with double jetway. Free wireless internet is provided throughout the terminal. It is connected to T2 by a walkway.

Air Astana is currently the main operator in T1. This terminal also serves Star Alliance carriers Air China, LOT Polish Airlines, Lufthansa, and Turkish Airlines (including affiliate member AJet). SkyTeam member airline Aeroflot (currently suspended) uses Terminal 1. Other airlines that are unaffiliated with any of the three major airline alliances also use Terminal 1. They include Azerbaijan Airlines, Belavia, China Southern Airlines, flydubai, Pegasus Airlines, Red Wings Airlines, Rossiya Airlines, SCAT Airlines, Uzbekistan Airways, VietJet Qazaqstan, and Wizz Air Abu Dhabi, among others. Almost all international charter flights are handled at Terminal 1 (which also handles scheduled services).

=== T2 – domestic terminal ===
Terminal 2 (despite its name, the older facility) is the original passenger terminal of the Nursultan Nazarbayev International Airport. The concept of the T2 building was designed by the late Japanese architect Kisho Kurokawa (or Kisho Kurokawa Architect & Associates) and, at present, serves all domestic flights. The inaugural international flight was a Transaero Airlines flight to Domodedovo Airport (DME) in Moscow. The passenger terminal consists of a basement level, two basic passenger levels and three VIP levels (building area 9,260m² and floor area 23,892m²). The central concourse is situated in a dome 45m in diameter and 36m in height, based on the shape of a traditional Kazakhstan moveable house called a ‘Yurt’.

With the opening of the new international terminal, the old terminal (now labelled "T2") is now dedicated to departures and arrivals of domestic flights and specialises in servicing air passengers traveling through the territory of Kazakhstan. T2 - was the original and only terminal when the airport was reconstructed in 2005. On 2 February 2005, the grand opening of the T2 passenger terminal of the airport took place. The terminal area is more than 25 thousand square meters. Terminal 2 is equipped with 24 check-in counters, six aerobridges, two baggage carousels, and six gates. The design of the airport is the fusion of eastern and western traditions. The building has five floors, panoramic elevators, escalators, aerobridges, lounges and the system of automatic check-in for passengers, airport shops, restaurants, cafes, a pharmacy, a call-center and other facilities. A small supermarket, known as Galmart, is open to both travellers and the general public. There is free Wi-Fi access in the building.

Primarily utilised by major Kazakhstan carriers Air Astana Group airlines: Air Astana and FlyArystan, SCAT Airlines, and VietJet Qazaqstan use Terminal 2. Terminal 2 has 6 gates equipped with jetbridges, including several ground level boarding gates. Terminal 2 houses exclusive Air Astana lounge.

=== Airside connectors ===
There are airside connectors at NQZ that enable passengers to move between adjacent terminal buildings while staying within the secure area.

== Air traffic ==
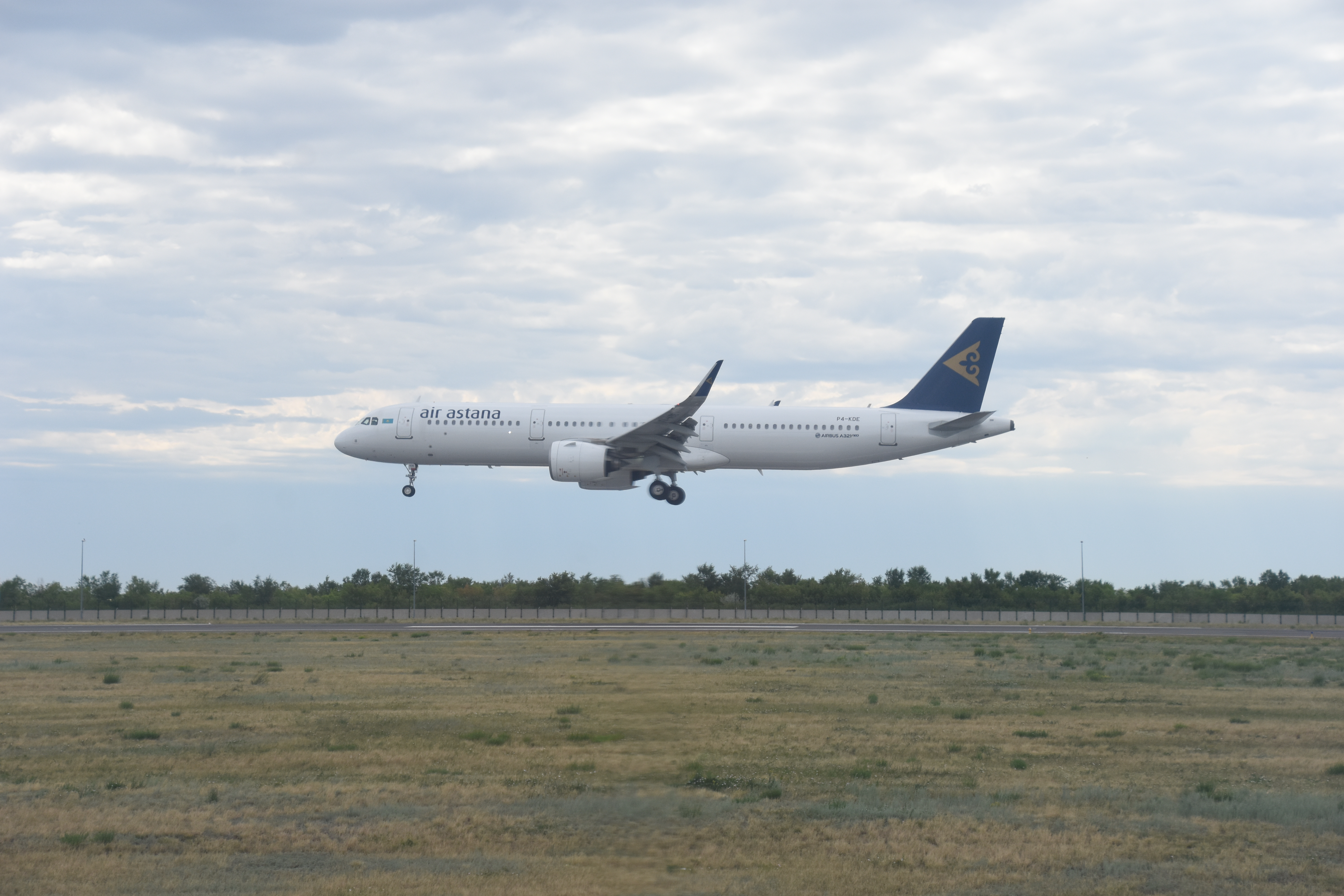
An Air Astana A321neo. The airline maintains its secondary hub at NQZ.

=== Main airlines based at NQZ ===
The following airlines maintain hub or base operations at Nursultan Nazarbayev International Airport:

- Air Astana maintains its secondary hub at the airport, providing scheduled services to the Middle East, Asia, and Europe.
- FlyArystan, a low-cost airline and subsidiary of Air Astana that operates to around 15 destinations from Astana. FlyArystan is using Air Astana's operating certificate.
- SCAT Airlines uses Nursultan Nazarbayev International Airport as a focus city and has international and domestic flights from NQZ.
- VietJet Qazaqstan maintains its homebase at the airport. The airline mostly operates from Terminal 2.

Passenger numbers have been growing rapidly since 2000, but especially since 2007. On 31 December 2024, the airport reached the milestone of 8.3 million passengers for the first time ever.

== Airlines and destinations ==
=== Passenger ===
The following airlines offer year-round and seasonal scheduled flights to and from Astana:

Airlines	Destinations
Aeroflot	Moscow–Sheremetyevo
Air Astana	Almaty, Aqtau, Aqtöbe, Atyrau, Bangkok–Suvarnabhumi (resumes 11 December 2026), Beijing–Capital, Dubai–International, Frankfurt, Guangzhou, Istanbul, Oral, Oskemen, Phuket, Salalah, Sharm El Sheikh (begins 11 December 2026), Şymkent, Seoul–Incheon; Seasonal: Antalya, Bodrum, Da Nang, Larnaca, Nha Trang, Phu Quoc, Podgorica, Qostanai, Tashkent Tbilisi; Seasonal charter: Doha, Malè, Sanya
Air Cairo	Seasonal charter: Sharm El Sheikh
Air China	Beijing–Capital, Xi'an
AJet	Ankara, Istanbul–Sabiha Gökçen (begins 7 January 2027)
Azerbaijan Airlines	Baku
Belavia	Minsk
Centrum Air	Tashkent
China Southern Airlines	Ürümqi
FlyArystan	Almaty, Aqtau, Aqtöbe, Atyrau, Kutaisi, Oral, Öskemen, Qostanai, Qyzylorda, Semei, Şymkent, Tashkent, Türkıstan, Ürümqi, Yining; Seasonal: Batumi, Bishkek, Issyk-Kul; Seasonal charter: Gazipaşa/Alanya, Goa-Dabolim, Goa-Manohar
flydubai	Dubai–International
LOT Polish Airlines	Warsaw–Chopin
Lufthansa	Frankfurt
Mavi Gök Airlines	Seasonal charter: Antalya
Nordwind Airlines	Kazan
Pegasus Airlines	Antalya, Istanbul–Sabiha Gökçen
Red Sea Airlines	Seasonal charter: Sharm El Sheikh
Red Wings Airlines	Kazan, Mineralnye Vody, Yekaterinburg
Rossiya Airlines	Saint Petersburg
S7 Airlines	Novosibirsk
SCAT Airlines	Almaty, Aqtau, Aqtobe, Atyrau, Belgrade, Moscow–Vnukovo, Öskemen, Pavlodar, Prague, Saint Petersburg, Şymkent, Taraz, Ulaanbaatar; Seasonal: Batumi, Pattaya, Ürjar, Üşaral; Seasonal charter: Antalya, Da Nang, El Alamein, Nha Trang, Sanya, Sharm El Sheikh
Shirak Avia	Yerevan
Somon Air	Dushanbe
Turkish Airlines	Istanbul; Seasonal charter: Antalya
Uzbekistan Airways	Tashkent
VietJet Air	Seasonal charter: Da Nang, Nha Trang, Phu Quoc
VietJet Qazaqstan	Almaty, Aqtobe, Bishkek, Jezqazğan, Novosibirsk, Omsk, Öskemen, Petropavl, Qostanai, Qyzylorda, Samarqand, Şymkent, Taldyqorğan, Türkıstan; Seasonal: Balqaş, Ürjar, Üşaral

=== Cargo ===
Airlines	Destinations
Cargolux	Luxembourg
Cathay Pacific Cargo	Hong Kong
My Freighter Airlines	Tashkent
Sichuan Airlines Cargo	Budapest, Chengdu–Tianfu

== Statistics ==
Map of airports flying from/to Astana Airport. (Last update: January 18, 2024)

=== Passenger figures ===
Annual passenger statistics
Year	Passengers
2009	1,309,000
2010	1,620,000
2011	1,984,000
2012	2,303,143
2013	2,609,431
2014	2,960,181
2015	3,366,560
2016	3,452,714
2017	4,294,145
2018	4,545,373
2019	5,099,391
2020	3,059,714
2021	4,837,464
2022	6,001,471
2023	7,546,391
2024	8,315,108

=== Most frequent routes ===
Astana/Nursultan Nazarbayev – Almaty/ALA is the most popular and busiest passenger air route in Kazakhstan.

Top 10 most frequent routes from NQZ as of July 2025 (by number of flights weekly)
Rank	Destination	Flights per week	Operating airlines
1	Almaty, Kazakhstan	~248	Air Astana, FlyArystan, SCAT
2	Şymkent, Kazakhstan	~92	FlyArystan, SCAT, VietJet Qazaqstan
3	Aqtöbe, Kazakhstan	~36	Air Astana, FlyArystan, SCAT, VietJet Qazaqstan
4	Aqtau, Kazakhstan	~31	Air Astana, FlyArystan, SCAT, VietJet Qazaqstan
5	Atyrau, Kazakhstan	~31	Air Astana, FlyArystan, SCAT
6	Qyzylorda, Kazakhstan	~29	FlyArystan, VietJet Qazaqstan
7	Oral, Kazakhstan	~27	Air Astana, FlyArystan
8	Öskemen, Kazakhstan	~23	Air Astana, FlyArystan, SCAT
9	Qostanai, Kazakhstan	~22	FlyArystan, VietJet Qazaqstan
10	Istanbul, Turkey	~18	Air Astana, SCAT, Turkish

== Services ==
=== Lounges ===
There are currently three airport lounges at the airport in all the terminals.

- Nursultan Nazarbayev International Airport offers a business class lounge, International Sapar Lounge, for all international departures operating from the airport with an airline invitation. "International Sapar Lounge", opened in 2017, covers an area of 854 m^{2} (9,190 sq ft). The lounge is located in the Terminal T1, 2nd floor, to the left after security checks, passport and customs control, next to the main Duty Free shop.
- The airport also has a business class lounge, Sapar Lounge, for all domestic departures operating from the airport with an airline invitation. The lounge is located in the Terminal T2, 1st floor, to the left after security checks, opposite the D06 gate.

==== Airline lounges ====
- Air Astana: The airport has The Shanyraq Domestic Business Lounge, which is the first dedicated airline owned and operated lounge at the airport in Central Asia. It is open from 4:00 a.m. - midnight daily exclusively for Air Astana (KC) Business Class passengers and Nomad Club Gold and Diamond Card members travelling on domestic flights after presenting a membership card. The lounge is located in the Terminal T2 on the 2nd floor opposite the D04 gate.

== Service quality ==
Nursultan Nazarbayev International Airport is a member of Airports Council International Europe (ACI EUROPE). Skytrax ranks Nursultan Nazarbayev International Airport as a 3-star airport.

=== Awards and recognitions ===
- Best Airport of Commonwealth of Independent States (CIS) in 2007 — for the category of passenger traffic of more than one million passengers per year" from the Association "Airport of Civil Aviation" which is based in Moscow.

Year	Award	Category	Results	Ref
2022	World Airport Awards by Skytrax	Best Regional Airport in Central Asia and CIS	Won	
2023	World Airport Awards by Skytrax	Best Regional Airport in Central Asia and CIS	Won	
2023	World Airport Awards by Skytrax	Best Airport in Central Asia and CIS	Silver	
2023	World Airport Awards by Skytrax	Best Airport Staff in Central Asia and CIS	Silver	
2023	World Airport Awards by Skytrax	The Cleanest Airport in Central Asia and CIS	Bronze	
2024	World Airport Awards by Skytrax	Best Regional Airport in Central Asia and CIS	Won	
2025	World Airport Awards by Skytrax	Best Airport Staff in Central Asia and CIS	Won	
2026	World Airport Awards by Skytrax	Best Airport in Central Asia and CIS	Bronze	
2026	World Airport Awards by Skytrax	Best Regional Airport in Central Asia and CIS	Won	

== Other facilities ==
=== Air traffic control tower ===
The RSE "Kazaeronavigatsia" is responsible for air traffic control and apron control at Nursultan Nazarbayev International Airport. At 40 metres (130 ft), the air traffic control tower (ATCT), designed by Pacific Consultants International (now Oriental Consultants) is the second highest in the country (only surpassed by Almaty International Airport, currently the tallest standalone tower at any Kazakhstan airport, at 45 metres (150 ft)). It was completed in 2001 and was the tallest in Kazakhstan at the time of its construction. It is located on the northside of the airfield alongside the Business Aviation Terminal (BAT) building. It replaced the old control tower once the current domestic terminal building was opened in 2005.

=== VIP and governmental facilities ===
==== Governmental terminal ====
This facility serves deputes (Members of Parliament) of the Mäjilis, the President of Kazakhstan, high-ranking members of the Kazakhstan government and other domestic and foreign officials and delegates.

==== VIP terminal ====
Government officials are frequent visitors. On 30 November 2010, the US Secretary of State Hillary Clinton visited the airport for a summit of the Organization for Security and Co-operation in Europe (OSCE) with Boeing C-32. On 13 September 2022, the head of the Catholic Church Pope Francis visited Nursultan Nazarbayev International Airport from Rome, where he was met by Kazakhstani President Kassym-Jomart Tokayev. In November 2023, the President of France Emmanuel Macron visited Nursultan Nazarbayev International Airport with his Airbus A330-200 (Cotam 001).

==== Business aviation terminal ====
NQZ is now only the second airport in Kazakhstan with a terminal for business jets. Nursultan Nazarbayev International Airport, as the main airport serving Astana, is also used by VIP flights using business jets. The Business Aviation Terminal (BAT) was built in 2016 to handle all VIP, Business and Private flights coming to Astana.

The Astana VIP Private Terminal, opened in 2017, features 32,300 m^{2} (348,000 sq ft) area and can handle 200 passengers an hour. The terminal has a conference hall and meeting rooms. The terminal building housed a lounge bar, a conference hall, rooms for negotiations, convenience for passengers with children, a duty-free shop, there are 52 parking spaces for guests.

=== Catering and cargo facilities ===
The inflight catering complex at Nursultan Nazarbayev International Airport features a single, one-storey building that meets all international requirements imposed by air catering sphere and is capable of producing up to 10,000 flight-packaged meals a day, with an area measuring 3,500 square metres (38,000 ft^{2}).

The cargo terminal is a two-tier building with a warehouse capacity of 600 tons of a cargo and a daily turnover of 300 tons. The airport handled 6 thousands tonnes of air cargo in 2022, a decrease of 59.4 per cent over 2021. On 23 November 2020 the airport was granted the RA-3 certificate (Regulated Agents Third country), a crucial requirement for facilitating the streamlined organisation of air cargo transport to the European Union.

=== Airport hotels ===
Nursultan Nazarbayev International Airport has two hotels located on site and adjacent to the airport, including the CAPS LOCK Airport capsule hotel in the international passenger terminal - T1 (opened in October 2018) that serve both transit passengers and passengers on early-morning, low-cost carrier flights as well as a transit hotel with 16 rooms in the domestic passenger terminal - T2. This allows passengers transiting through Astana to stay at a hotel without exiting the terminal.

=== Hangar buildings ===
There are several hangars around the airfield. In 2018, Air Astana established and commissioned a heavy maintenance centre at Nursultan Nazarbayev International Airport. The Aviation Technical Centre is a single-span commodious hangar that offers 5,556 m^{2} (59,800 sq ft) of floor space and capable of handling a wide-body type like the Boeing 767 or Boeing 787 Dreamliner. Since the Astana MRO center was completed, Air Astana reported conducting maintenance services for Qatar Airways, Turkish Airlines, and LOT Polish Airlines and claimed its MRO facilities service more than 20 third-party airlines.

On 1 June 2018 a modular warehouse was inaugurated at NQZ. Located in the controlled area of the airport with direct access to the apron, the facility spans over 1,100 m^{2} (12,000 sq ft). It includes designated areas for cargo and mail handling from domestic airlines and customs union countries, as well as for transfer cargo. With a capacity of up to 12,000 tons per year, the warehouse enhances the airport's capabilities for efficient cargo operations.

=== Flight training ===
The airport is home to Air Astana’s flight training centre which is the first in Central Asia to be certified by the European Aviation Safety Agency (EASA) and provides training for Air Astana and FlyArystan pilots. The facility is equipped with a full-flight Airbus A320 Reality Seven simulator supplied by L3Harris Technologies, the first ever installation in the country.

== Ground transport ==
=== Public transport ===
The primary mode of transportation to and from the airport is by road. Travelers to Astana often arrange ground transportation in advance due to its convenience.

==== Light Metro ====
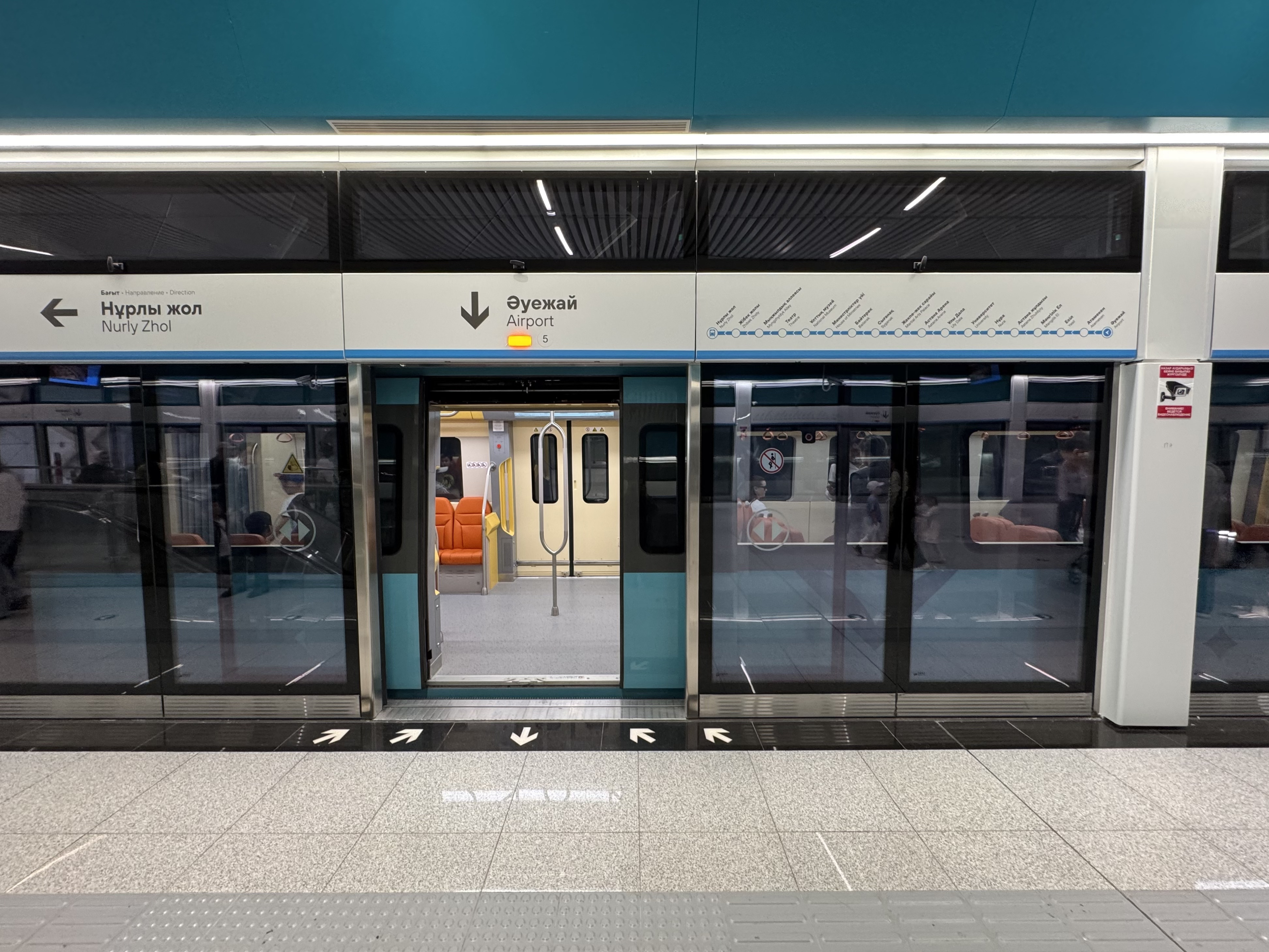
Platform view of Airport Station, Astana LRT system (photographed in May 2026)

City Transportation Systems (CTS) operates the Airport Station, which is accessible via an elevated walkway from Terminal 2. From this station, passengers can travel to Astana-Nurly Zhol station and a range of other destinations, including Nazarbayev University, Abu Dhabi Plaza near the Baiterek Tower, and the House of Ministries, Astana Arena, the Botanical Garden, and the National Museum. Trains run every 3.5 to 10 minutes, and the standard fare is 200 KZT. The journey to Baiterek station takes approximately 35 minutes, while the trip to Nurly Zhol station takes around 50 minutes.

==== Local buses ====
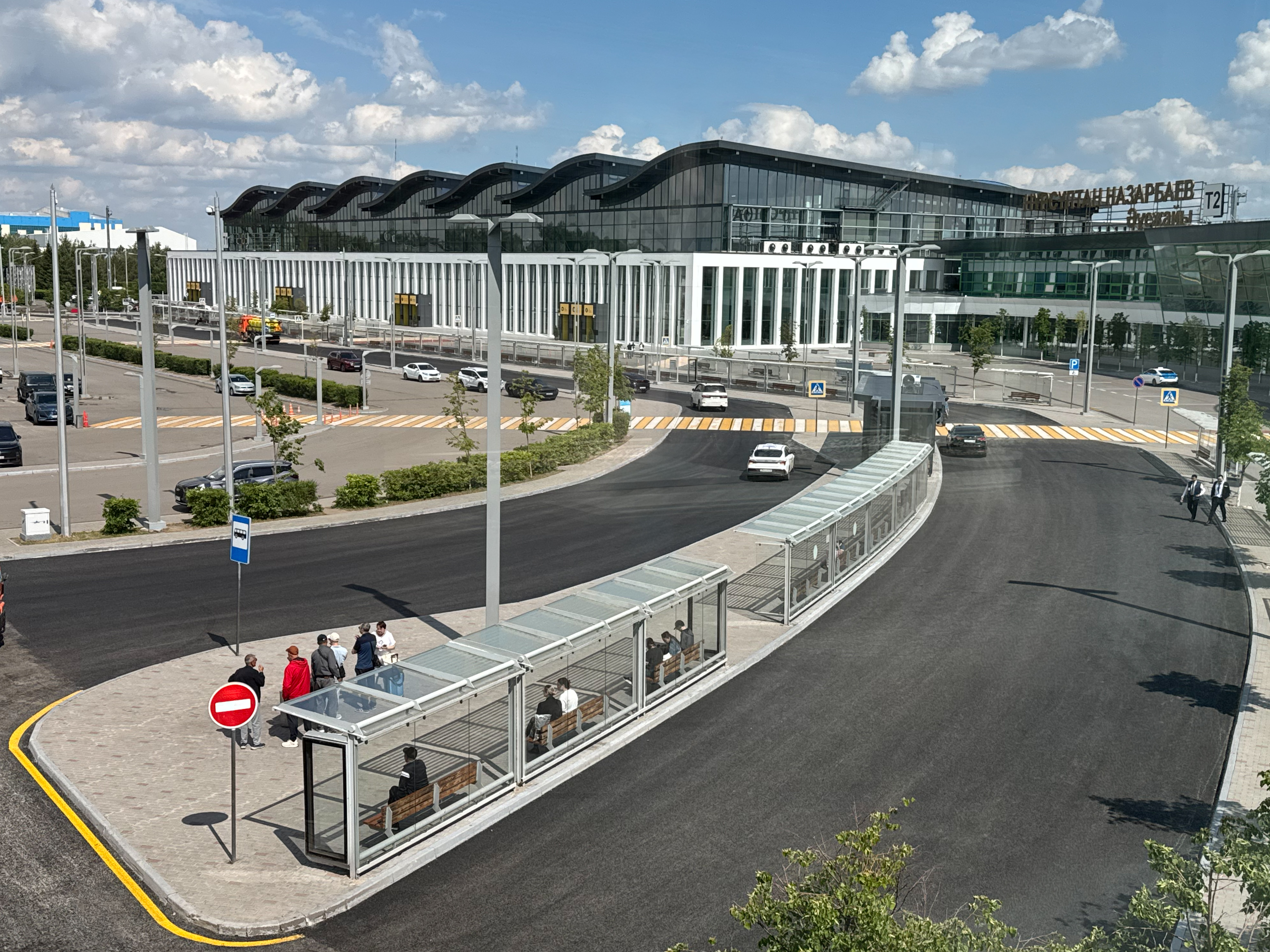
Bus stop at Nursultan Nazarbayev International Airport (photographed in May 2026)

No. 10 and 12 municipal bus lines connects the airport with the city centre of Astana. Standard tickets and passes are valid on this route.

Three airport bus lines serve the airport, providing rapid links to various destinations.

- Airport Bus Route 10: To Astana-Nurly Zhol station via Nazarbayev University, Astana Arena, Alau Ice Palace, Saryarka Velodrome, Nur-Astana Mosque, Khan Shatyr Entertainment Center near the Nurjol Boulevard, Talan Towers, Grand Alatau, Our Mother of Perpetual Help Cathedral, and to Khabar Agency
- Airport Bus Route 12: To High school № 19 via Astana Grand Mosque, Astana Botanical Garden, Jastar Park near the Dongelek Square, Astana Opera, Emerald Towers, Kazakhstan Central Concert Hall, Ramstor Bridge, Embassy of Norway, Astana-Saparjai-1 Bus Station, and to Astana-1 station
- Airport Express Bus Route 100: To Astana-Nurly Zhol station via Palace of Independence

Service is available from 06:00 to 22:00 and run from the airport (bus stops are situated opposite both Terminal 1 and 2 just outside the airport) to the city center and vice versa with intermediate stops in between. The single fare is 180. Contactless cards are accepted on all bus routes from Nursultan Nazarbayev International Airport into Astana.

==== Car and taxi ====
The airport is located on the Regional Road P3, about 16.7 kilometers (12 mi) from the city center and about 25 minutes drive, depending on traffic. There is extensive car and motorcycle parking space available including long-, mid-, and short-stay options. Starting from 30 June 2021 passengers and guests at the airport can conveniently pay for parking using Halyk Bank QR or Kaspi QR. Taxis are also available directly outside the terminal building at the airport parking lot (Yandex.Taxi and inDriver). Many taxi companies offer a flat-rate for to/from Airport trips (the rate is usually 1,650), booked via mobile app.

== Major accidents and incidents ==
The following is a list of major accidents or incidents that occurred to planes at NQZ, on approach, or just after takeoff from the airport:

- 17 June 1967 – Aeroflot Li-2 (CCCP-71220) operating from Tselinograd Airport (now Nursultan Nazarbayev International Airport), in Astana to Karaganda Airport (now Sary-Arka Airport) stalled and crashed onto a runway at Tselinograd, killing 2 of the 3 crew, and 7 of the 31 passengers.
- 4 October 1989 – Aeroflot An-24 (CCCP-46525) skidded off a runway on approach to Tselinograd Airport due to its pilots landing at excessive speed. After landing, the plane crashed into a pillar of the airport's fence. The plane was written off as damaged beyond repair but none of the 4 pilots or 48 passengers were injured.
- 25 December 2012 – An-72 of the Kazakhstan Border Guards which had taken off from Astana International airport crashed short of the runway at Shymkent International Airport amid low visibility weather and technical malfunctions with the aircraft's barometer. All 27 people aboard the plane were killed.

== See also ==
- Transport in Kazakhstan
- List of airports in Kazakhstan
- Kokshetau International Airport (located in Akmola Region 287 km (178 mi) from Astana)
- List of the busiest airports in Kazakhstan
- List of the busiest airports in the former USSR
