= Mänşük Mämetova Oral International Airport =

Airport in Kazakhstan

Mänşük Mämetova Oral International Airport Mänşük Mämetova Xalıqaralıq Äwejayı
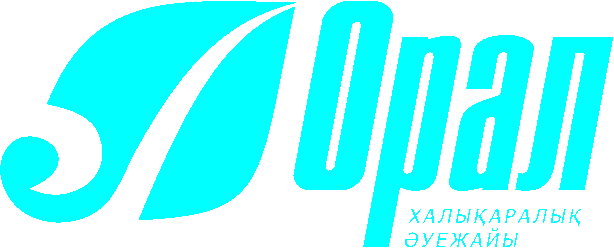

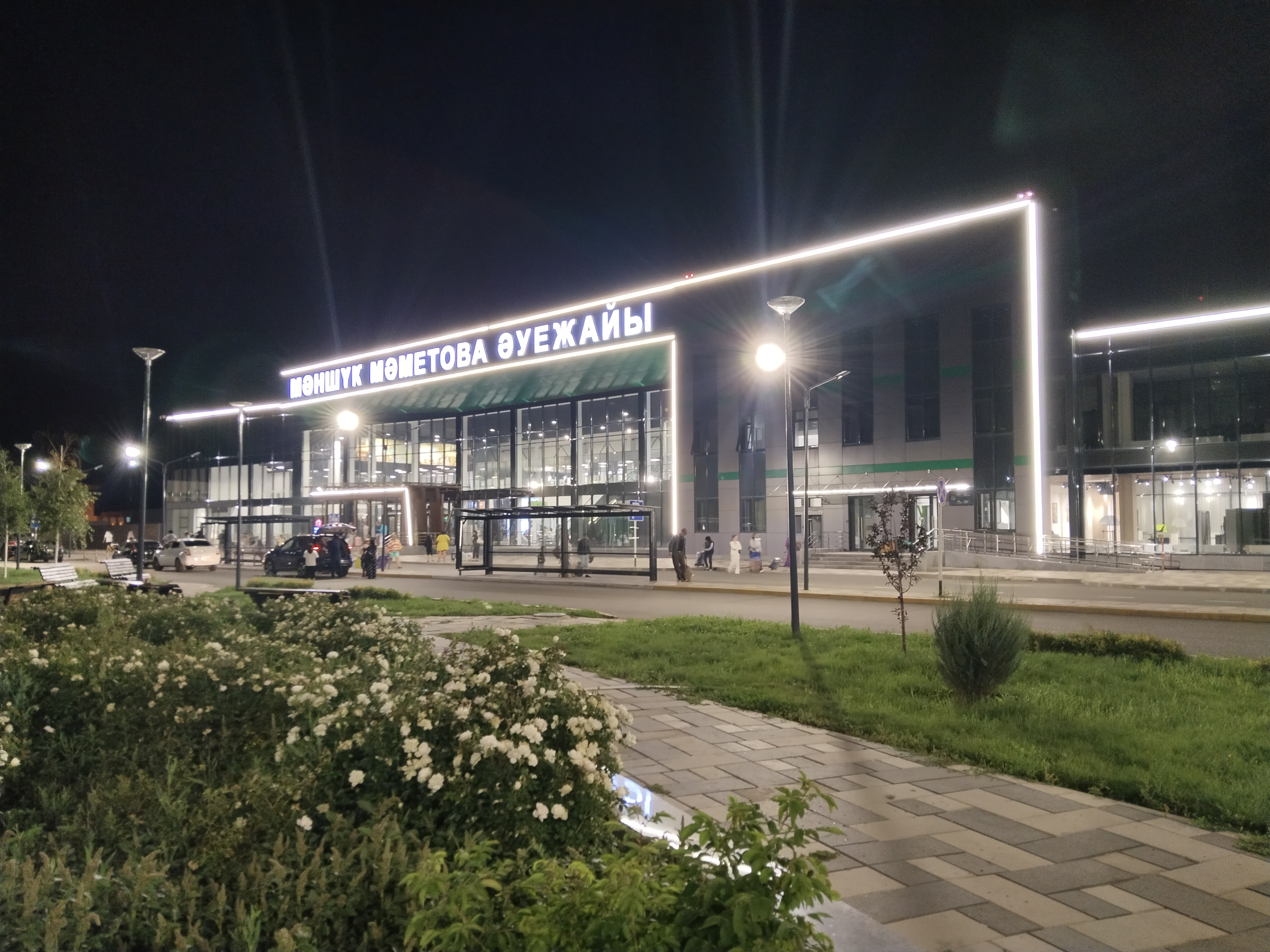
- IATA: URA; ICAO: UARR

Summary
- Airport type: Public
- Operator: Oral Airport Holding LLP
- Serves: Oral
- Location: 12 km (7.5 mi) SE of Oral, Kazakhstan
- Elevation AMSL: 38 m (125 ft)
- Coordinates: 51°09′03″N 051°32′35″E
- Website: ura.aero

Maps
- Location in Kazakhstan URA (Europe)
- Interactive map of Mänşük Mämetova Oral International Airport

Runways
Direction	Length		Surface
Direction	m	ft	Surface
22-04	2,799	9,183	Concrete
- Source: AIP Kazakhstan

Mänşük Mämetova Oral International Airport (Kazakh: Mänşük Mämetova Xalıqaralıq Äwejayı) (IATA: URA), (previously known as Oral Ak Zhol International Airport), is an international airport in Kazakhstan located 12 km (7 mi) southeast of Oral (Uralsk). The airport is located south of the Oral River.

In February 2023, Oral Airport was acquired by Oral Airport Holding LLP. It is a Kazakhstani company, the controlling stake of which belongs to the Kazakhstani Uralsk Management LLP and businessman Dauletkhan Kilybayev, and a minority stake (49%) is owned by the Russian company JSC Retrans. The company hopes to turn Oral airport into a regional hub, expand the route network and carry out technical re-equipment of the airport

in 2022 airport was officially renamed in order to commemorate Mänşük Jienğaliqyzy Mämetova who was a machine gunner during the Second World War. She became the first Kazakh woman to be awarded the title Hero of the Soviet Union.

== Facilities ==
It is a small airport servicing medium-sized airliners. It has parking for four jets. This airport has one terminal. The airport also serves the nearby town of Aksai, which provides the majority of airport passenger traffic, being the "capital" of the gas industry in West Kazakhstan. In the past, a weekly international charter flight was operated by Astraeus Airlines from Oral to London Gatwick/London Stansted; this was subsequently operated by Air Astana to Amsterdam; however, the route was terminated, along with other Air Astana flights, due to the poor condition of the runway. The airport runway and facilities were inspected by Mott MacDonald to confirm that its substandard condition prevented the airport from accommodating larger jet aircraft. On 17 April 2013, the decision was made to transfer the airport's ownership back to the government for runway reconstruction.

A new terminal was built and opened in April 2022. It aims to double the capacity of the airport to 600 thousand people per year.

== Airlines and destinations ==
Airlines	Destinations
Centrum Air	Tashkent
Nordwind Airlines	Moscow Sheremetyevo
FlyArystan	Aqtau, Astana, Dubai-International (begins 24 December 2026); Seasonal charter: Antalya
Pegasus Airlines	Istanbul-Sabiha Gökçen
SCAT Airlines	Almaty, Qarağandy
Sunday Airlines	Seasonal charter: Antalya
Vietjet Qazaqstan	Aqtöbe

== Ground transport ==
=== Bus ===
The No 12 municipal bus line connects Mänşük Mämetova Airport with centrally located Oral Train station.

=== Taxi ===
There are private taxi cabs available at the airport parking lot.
