= Zhezkazgan Airport =

Airport in Kazakhstan

Zhezkazgan Airport Жезқазған Әуежайы
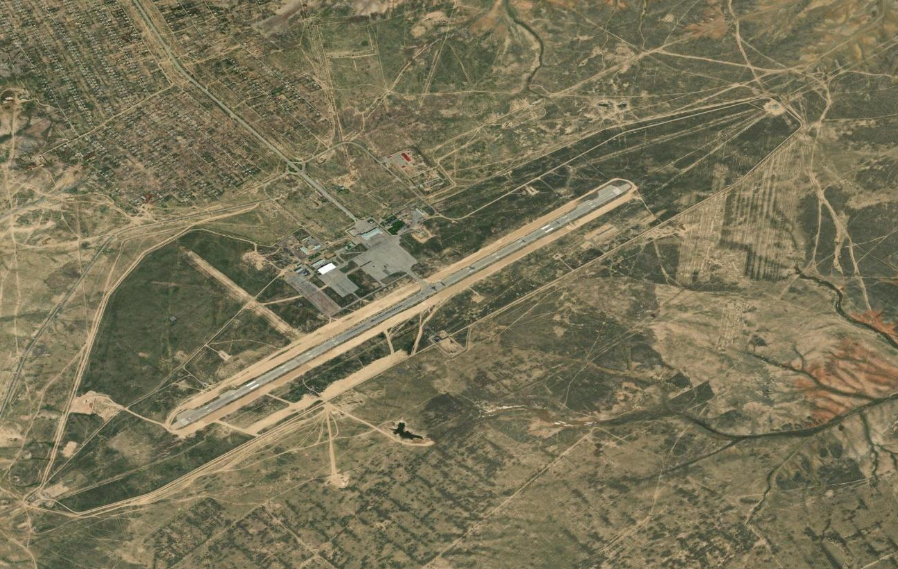
- IATA: DZN; ICAO: UAKD

Summary
- Airport type: Public
- Operator: JSC "Zhezkazgan Air"
- Location: 8 km (5.0 mi) SE of Zhezqazghan, Kazakhstan
- Elevation AMSL: 381 m (1,250 ft)
- Coordinates: 47°42′32″N 067°44′21″E
- Website: www.zhezair.kz/eng

Maps
- Location in Kazakhstan
- Interactive map of Zhezkazgan Airport

Runways
Direction	Length		Surface
Direction	m	ft	Surface
04/22	2,600	8,530	Concrete
- Source: AIP Kazakhstan

Zhezkazgan Airport (Kazakh: Жезқазған Әуежайы / Jezqazğan Äuejaiy, IATA: DZN, ICAO: UAKD) is an international airport, serving the city of Zhezqazghan in the Ulytau Region of Kazakhstan.

At the moment, it has one asphalt and concrete runway, and other four unpaved runways. The pavement classification number is 37/R/B/X/T.

In 2015, 29,518 passengers have gone through the airport, and in 2016 this number fell to 26,624 people.

== History ==
An old airport was located in 1 km (0.62 mi) from the train station of Zhezkazgan. It had two unpaved runways: 18/36 with the length of 1,800 m (5,900 ft) and 10/28 with the length of 1,400 m (4,600 ft).

Often, airport couldn't operate flights due to its runways getting wet because of rain or melting snow in the spring, what has led to canceling flights.

New, currently operating airport with an asphalt-concrete runway was built in 1971–1973, and in 1985, a new terminal was built, which could serve up to 200 passengers per hour.

The first flight, operated by the new airport, was done by an Ilyushin Il-18 airplane. In the 1970s, Zhezkazgan United Air Squadron (Russian: Джезказганская объединённая авиаэскадрилья) was formed in the airport. In 1983 it started using L-410 planes in commercial purposes, and in 1995 it has got two Mi-8 helicopters.

Zhezkazgan Air (Russian: "Жезказган Эйр") airline was formed in the airport in October 1996.

In 2004, the airport has received a reconstruction of its terminal and the runway, as well as an upgrade of its equipment. This was made possible with the financial support from Kazakhmys Corporation, a copper mining company.

In 2008, the airport was declared international after a decree from the government of Kazakhstan.

== Used aircraft ==
- Antonov An-12
- Antonov An-24
- Antonov An-26
- Ilyushin Il-76
- Tupolev Tu-134
- Tupolev Tu-154
- Yakovlev Yak-40
- Yakovlev Yak-42
- Bombardier CRJ100/200
- Bombardier Q400
- Embraer EMB 120 Brasilia
- Boeing 737

== Airlines and destinations ==
Airlines	Destinations
Qazaq Air	Astana, Öskemen, Qarağandy, Şymkent
SCAT Airlines	Almaty, Astana
Zhezkazgan Air	Qarağandy

== Accidents ==
- On 6 January 1987, an Antonov An-2R (aircraft registration number 16075) of the Zhezkazgan United Air Squadron, which was performing a X-607 mail flight through Zhezkazgan - Qara-Qengir - Qorghasyn - Amangeldi - Sary-Qengir - Jetiqonyr - Zhezkazgan route, has crashed 34 km (21 mi) north of Urozhayny airfield in Karaganda Region due to difficult weather conditions (low cloudiness, snowfall, icing and limited visibility). During the flight over the snowy terrain on an altitude, that was lower than the safe one, the crew lost visual contact with the ground. At 12:03 MSK, the plane has collided with a hill on an altitude of 680 m (2,230 ft). Aircraft commander has died immediately; the second pilot was found alive and was evacuated by a helicopter into a hospital, where he died on 13 January 1987. Search and rescue operations were complicated by difficult weather conditions (a blizzard, heavy wind and low cloudiness).
