= Airport (Astana LRT) =

Airport Әуежай / Äuejai
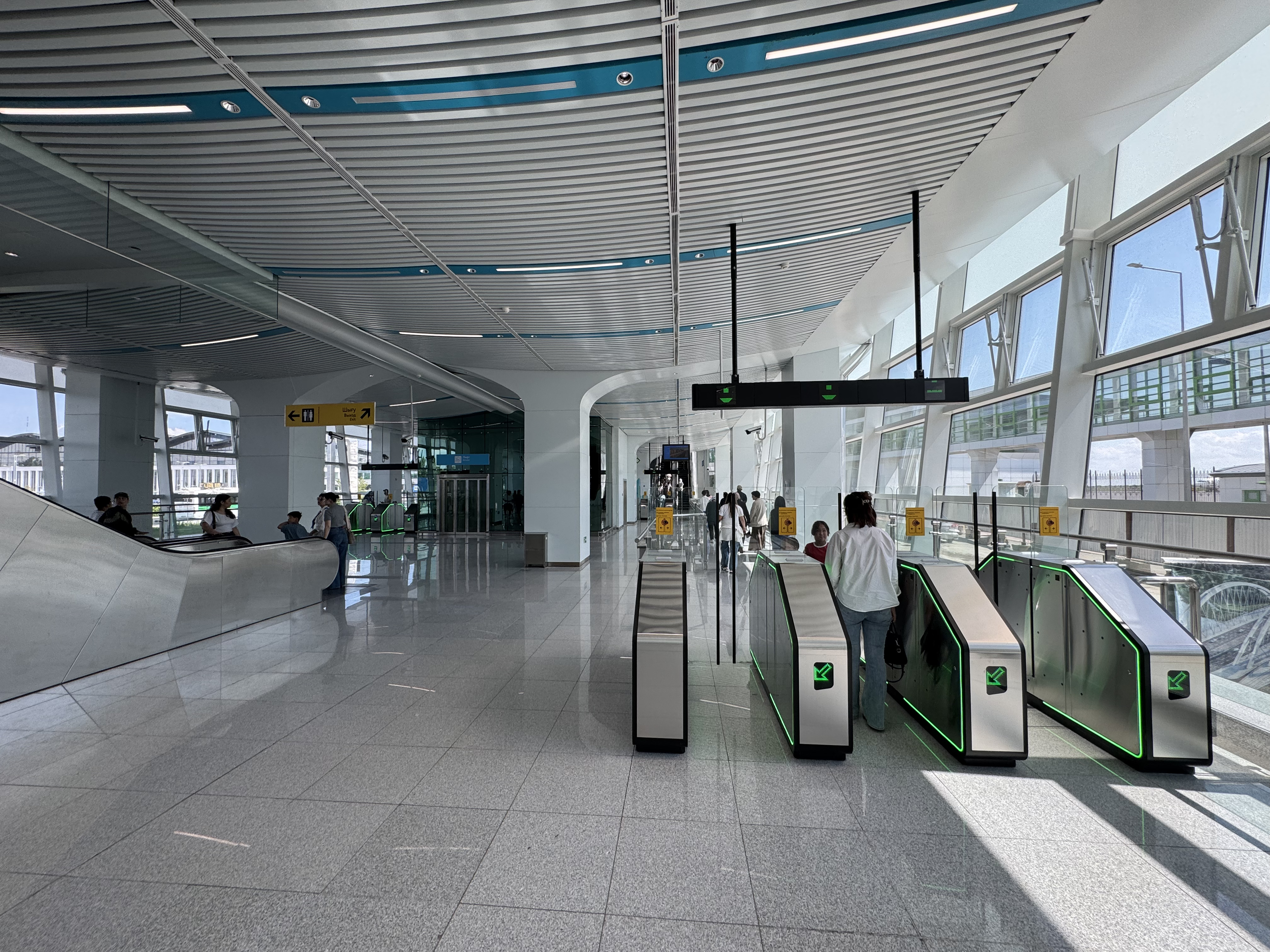
- Interior view of Airport station, May 2026

General information
- Location: Nursultan Nazarbayev International Airport, Esil District, Left Bank, 000001; Astana (inside city limits), Kazakhstan
- Coordinates: 51°01′41.27″N 071°27′31.02″E
- System: Astana Light Metro station
- Owner: Astana Light Metro
- Line: Line 1
- Platforms: 1 island platform with 2 platform edges
- Tracks: 2
- Connections: Nursultan Nazarbayev International Airport: Bus: 10, 12, 100

Construction
- Structure type: At-grade
- Parking: No
- Accessible: Yes

Other information
- Station code: 101
- IATA code: NQZ
- Website: Official page

History
- Opened: 16 May 2026; 3 months ago
Location

Airport (Kazakh: Әуежай, romanized: Äuejai; Russian: Аэропорт, romanized: Aeroport) is an elevated passenger light rapid transit (LRT) station of the Astana Light Metro that serves the international airport of Astana, Kazakhstan. The station opened as part of the Line 1 on 16 May 2026. It serves as one of the stations on the Line 1. This station provides access to the airport's Domestic Terminal - T2. It is approximately a 5-minute walk from Terminal 1. The station is also close to a number of bus routes.

The station along with the line is owned and operated by municipally owned City Transportation Systems. It operates services every 5 to 10 min between 06.00 and 23.00.

== History ==
Construction of a pedestrian skywalk between Terminal 2 at Astana International Airport and the 'Airport' LRT station began on 21 December 2025 and was completed on 12 May 2026.

== Services ==
The station currently serves one passenger line. Airport Station is served by the 21.5 kilometres (13.4 mi) Line 1. The journey from Nursultan Nazarbayev International Airport to Astana-Nurly Zhol station takes 40–50 minutes (with intermediate stops at Baiterek and National Museum stations).

- Line 1

== Public transport ==
The station is served by the following municipal public transport services:

- Bus: 10, 12, 100

== Gallery ==
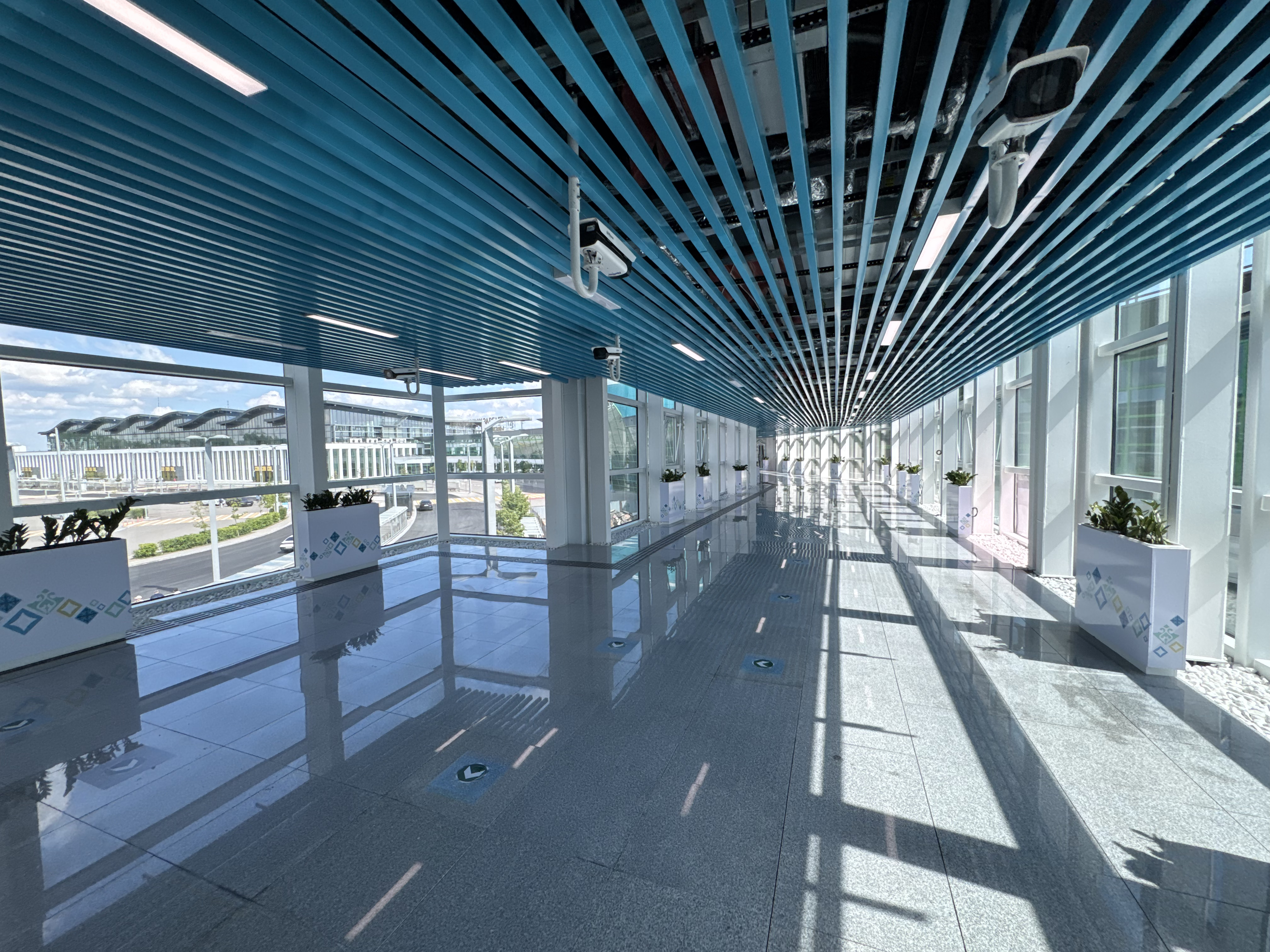
Pedestrian corridor connecting Airport Station with Nursultan Nazarbayev International Airport

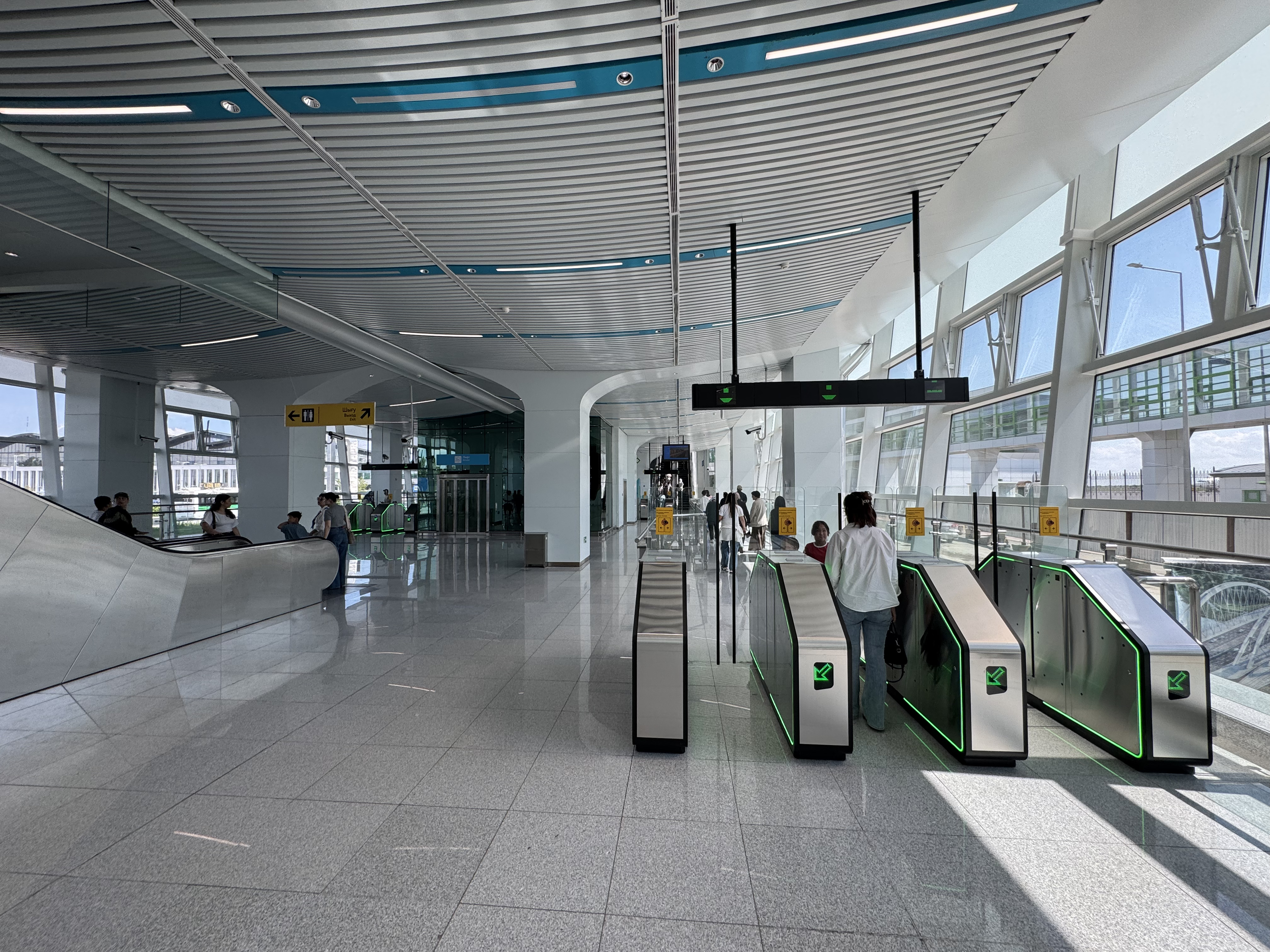
Interior view of the concourse at Airport Station

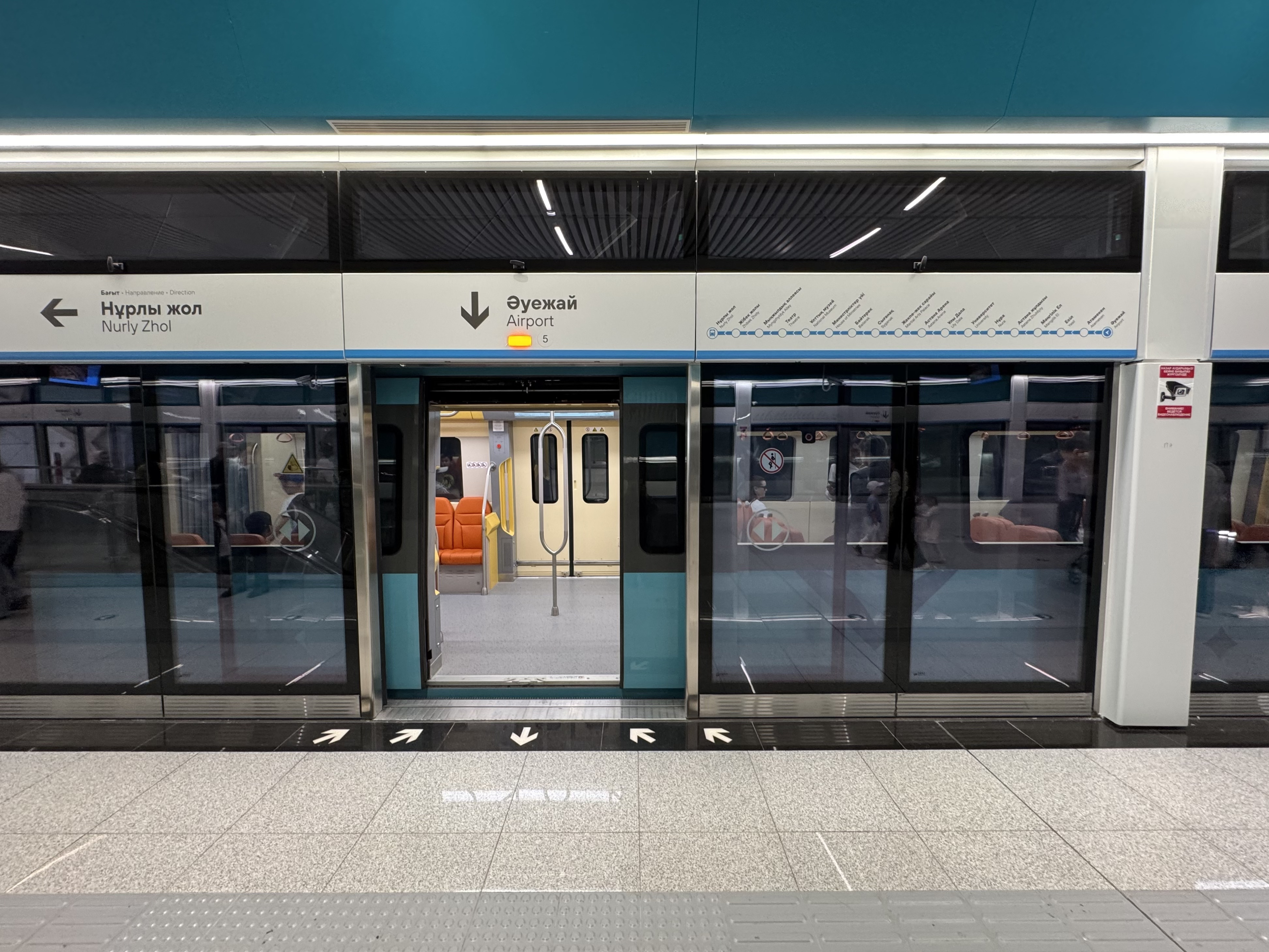
Airport station platform

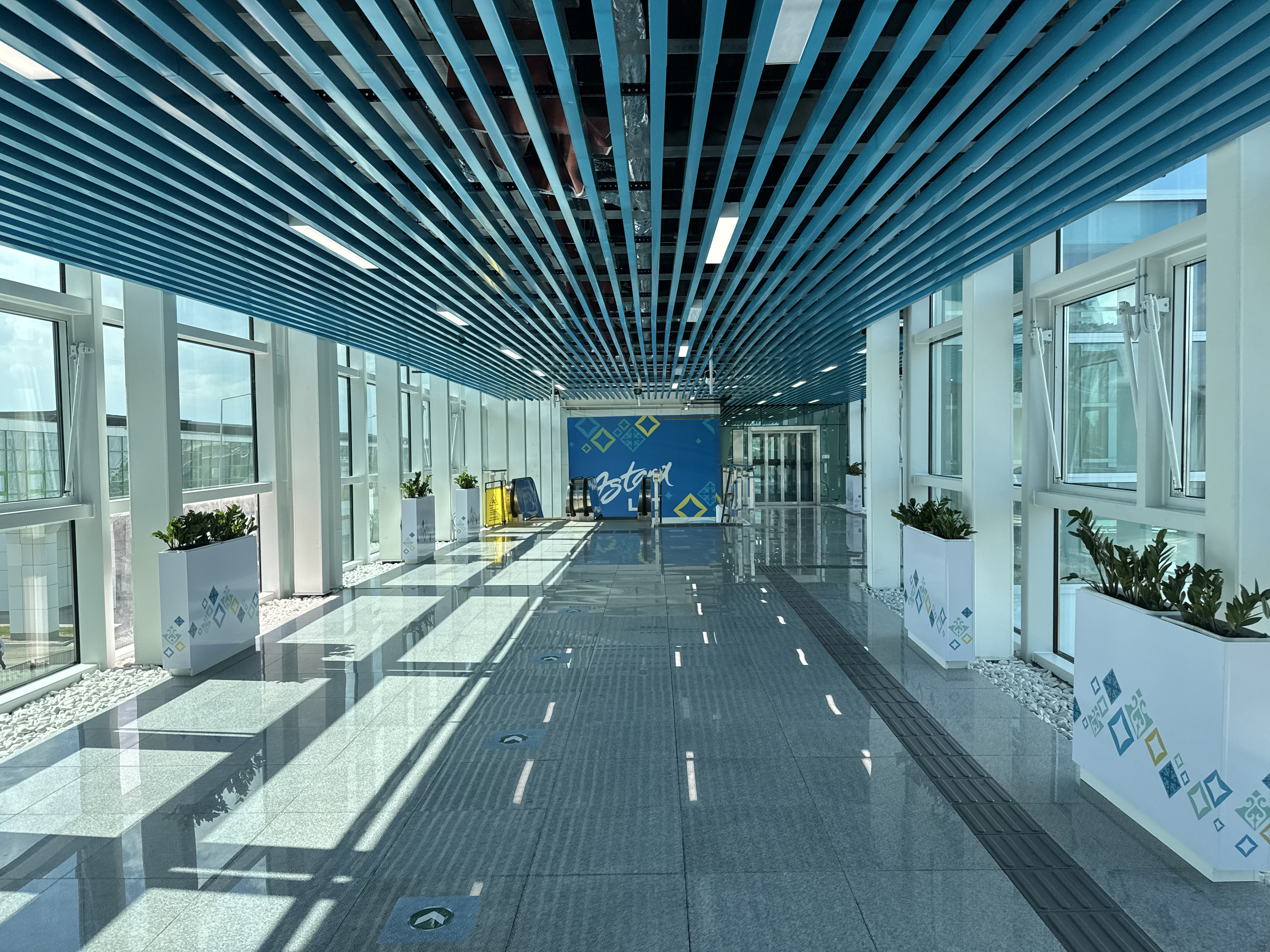
View down the walkway toward the Airport station entrance from the T2

== Surrounding areas ==
- Nursultan Nazarbayev International Airport
