= Zhezkazgan Air =

Airline of Kazakhstan

IATA	ICAO	Call sign
-	KZH	ULUTAU
- Hubs: Jezqazğan Airport
- Focus cities: Qaragandy
- Fleet size: 5
- Destinations: 3 (all domestic)
- Headquarters: Jezqazğan, Kazakhstan
- Website: http://zhezair.com/

Zhezkazgan Air, branded as ZhezAir, is an airline which operates scheduled and charter flights in Kazakhstan. It is headquartered at Jezqazğan Airport in Jezqazğan and operates domestic flights out of its base.

Until August 2012, the Government of Kazakhstan had the majority of stocks in the company. On August 29, 2012 the government stocks were offered for purchase at the Kazakhstan Stock Exchange.

== Destinations ==
- Jezqazğan – Jezqazğan Airport [base]
- Qaragandy – Sary-Arka Airport

== Fleet ==
The ZhezAir fleet consists the following aircraft as of February 2020:

ZhezAir fleet
Aircraft	In fleet	Orders	Passengers	Notes
Yakovlev Yak-40	1	0	TBC	
Let L-410	3	0	19	
Mil Mi-8	2	0	TBC	
Antonov An-2	1	0	TBC	
