= Starline.kz =

Airline of Kazakhstan

StarLine.kz Старлайн.кз
IATA	ICAO	Call sign
DZ	LMZ	ALUNK
- Founded: 2006
- Ceased operations: 2009
- Hubs: Aktobe Airport
- Secondary hubs: Astana International Airport
- Fleet size: 2 (upon closure)
- Headquarters: Almaty, Kazakhstan
- Key people: Leonid Sokolov (president); Jurij Gafurov (vice president)
- Website: starLine.kz (defunct)

JSC Starline KZ, styled as StarLine.kz (Russian: Старлайн.кз), was an airline based in Aktobe, Kazakhstan, which offered scheduled passenger flights from its bases at Aktobe Airport and Astana International Airport to destinations within Kazakhstan, Turkey and the United Arab Emirates, using a fleet of two Boeing 737-200 aircraft.

== History ==
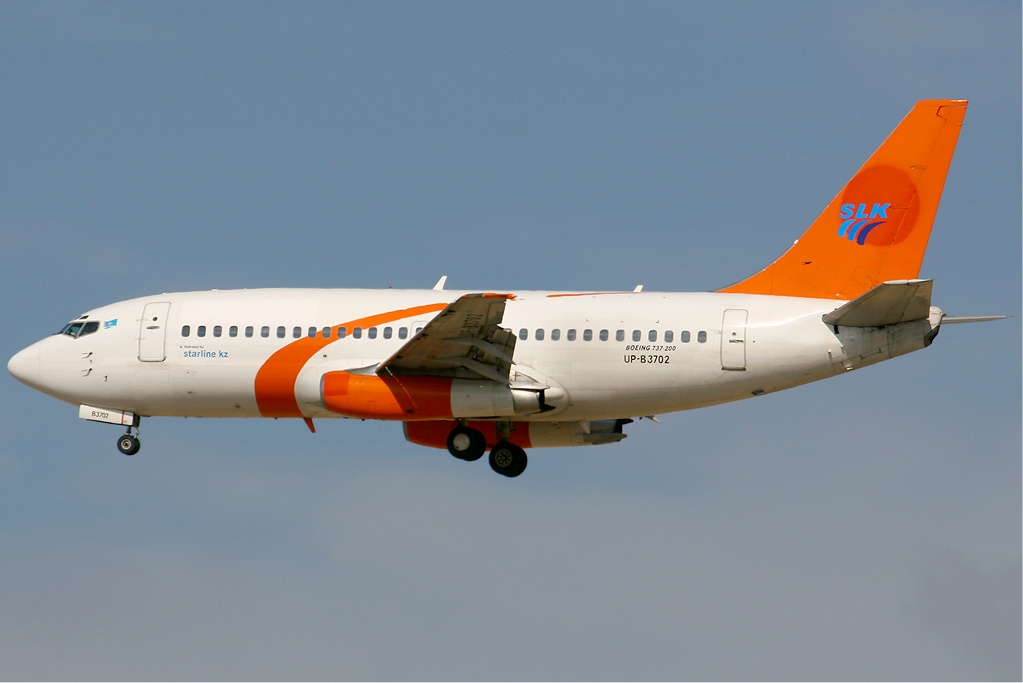
A Starline Boeing 737-200 approaches Dubai International Airport in 2008.

Starline was established in late 2005, though flight operations were only launched in May 2007. On 1 April 2009, the airline had its airline license revoked, shortly before all Kazakh airlines but Air Astana were banned from entering EU airspace due to the poor maintenance standards in the country.
