= Oskemen Airport =

Airport in Kazakhstan

Oskemen International Airport
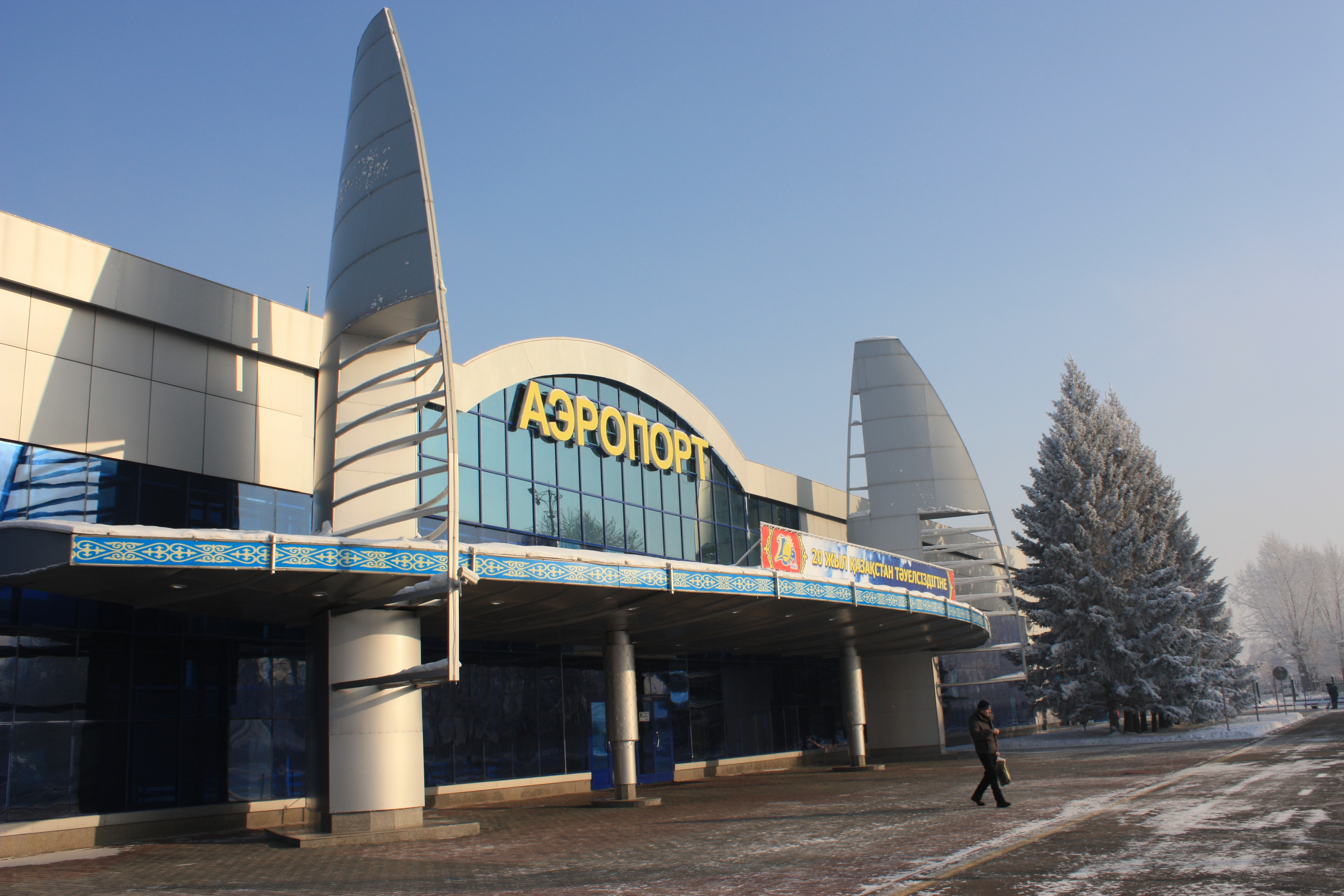
- IATA: UKK; ICAO: UASK

Summary
- Airport type: Public
- Operator: JSC "Ust-Kamenogorsk Airport"
- Serves: Oskemen (Ust-Kamenogorsk)
- Location: Oskemen (Ust-Kamenogorsk), Kazakhstan
- Elevation AMSL: 286 m (938 ft)
- Coordinates: 50°02′10″N 082°29′39″E
- Website: airport-uk.kz/

Maps
- Location in Kazakhstan
- Interactive map of Oskemen International Airport

Runways
Direction	Length		Surface
Direction	m	ft	Surface
12/30	2,510	8,235	Asphalt
12/30	1,700	5,577	Dirt
- Source: AIP Kazakhstan

Oskemen Airport or Ust-Kamenogorsk Airport (IATA: UKK, ICAO: UASK) is an airport in Kazakhstan. It is located 13 km (8.1 mi) north-west of Oskemen, the capital of the East Kazakhstan Region. The airport services regional jets.

== Facilities ==
The airport is at an elevation of 286 m (938 ft) above mean sea level. It has one asphalt paved runway designated 12/30 which measures 2,510 by 42 metres (8,235 ft × 138 ft).

== Airlines and destinations ==
Airlines	Destinations
Air Astana	Almaty, Astana
FlyArystan	Almaty, Astana
S7 Airlines	Moscow–Domodedovo, Novosibirsk
SCAT Airlines	Almaty, Astana, Qarağandy, Ürjar, Zaisan
Sunday Airlines	Seasonal charter: Antalya

== See also ==
- Transport in Kazakhstan
- List of the busiest airports in the former USSR
