= Aktobe International Airport =

Airport in Kazakhstan

Aliya Moldagulova International Airport Әлия Молдағұлова халықаралық әуежайы
- Aktobe Airport

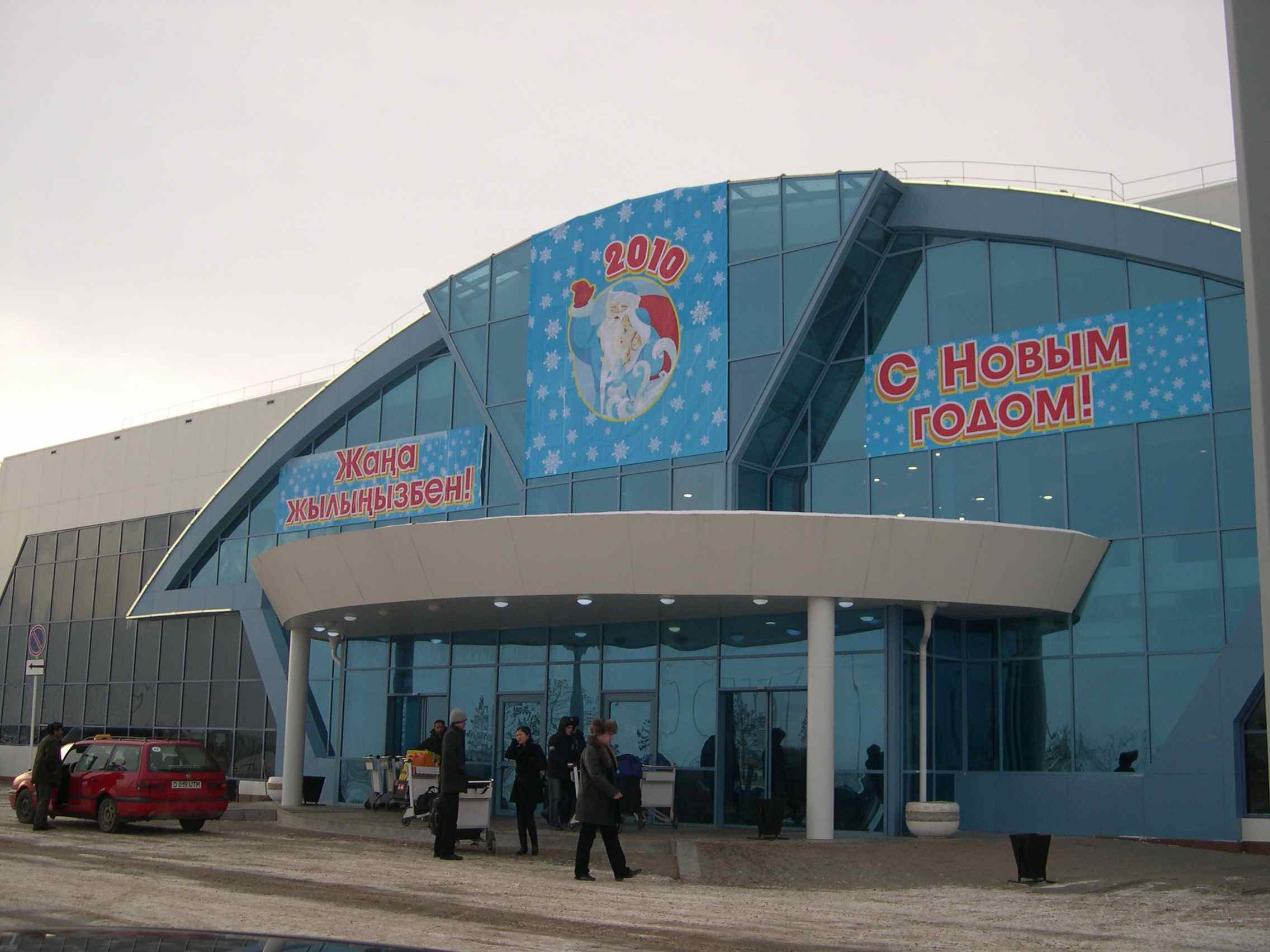
- IATA: AKX; ICAO: UATT

Summary
- Airport type: Public
- Operator: «Aliya Moldagulova International Airport» JSC (the State Institution «Department of Finance of Aktobe region»)
- Serves: Aktobe
- Location: 1.5 km (0.93 mi) SW of Aktobe
- Elevation AMSL: 225 m (738 ft)
- Coordinates: 50°14′45″N 57°12′24″E
- Website: akx.kz

Maps
- Location in Kazakhstan
- Interactive map of Aliya Moldagulova International Airport

Runways
Direction	Length		Surface
Direction	m	ft	Surface
13/31	3,203	10,509	Concrete
- Source: AIP Kazakhstan

Aliya Moldagulova International Airport (Kazakh: Әлия Молдағұлова халықаралық әуежайы) (IATA: AKX, ICAO: UATT) is an international airport in Kazakhstan located 1.5 km (0.93 mi) south-west of Aktobe. It has a small terminal with five airliner parking spots. It has serviced the Ilyushin Il-86. In 2023, the airport served more than 900,000 passengers. On 28 April 2021, the airport was officially renamed in order to commemorate Aliya Moldagulova - Kazakh woman, Hero of the Soviet Union and sniper of the Red Army famous for eliminating over 30 Nazi soldiers during World War II.

== Airlines and destinations ==
Airlines	Destinations
Air Astana	Almaty, Astana
Air Cairo	Seasonal: Sharm El Sheikh
Azerbaijan Airlines	Baku
Centrum Air	Tashkent
FlyArystan	Almaty, Aqtau, Astana
Pegasus Airlines	Istanbul–Sabiha Gökçen
SCAT Airlines	Almaty, Astana, Şymkent, Türkistan
Sunday Airlines	Seasonal charter: Antalya, Sharm El Sheikh
VietJet Qazaqstan	Astana

== See also ==
- List of airports in Kazakhstan
- List of the busiest airports in the former USSR
