= Astana Light Metro =

Rapid transit system in Astana, Kazakhstan

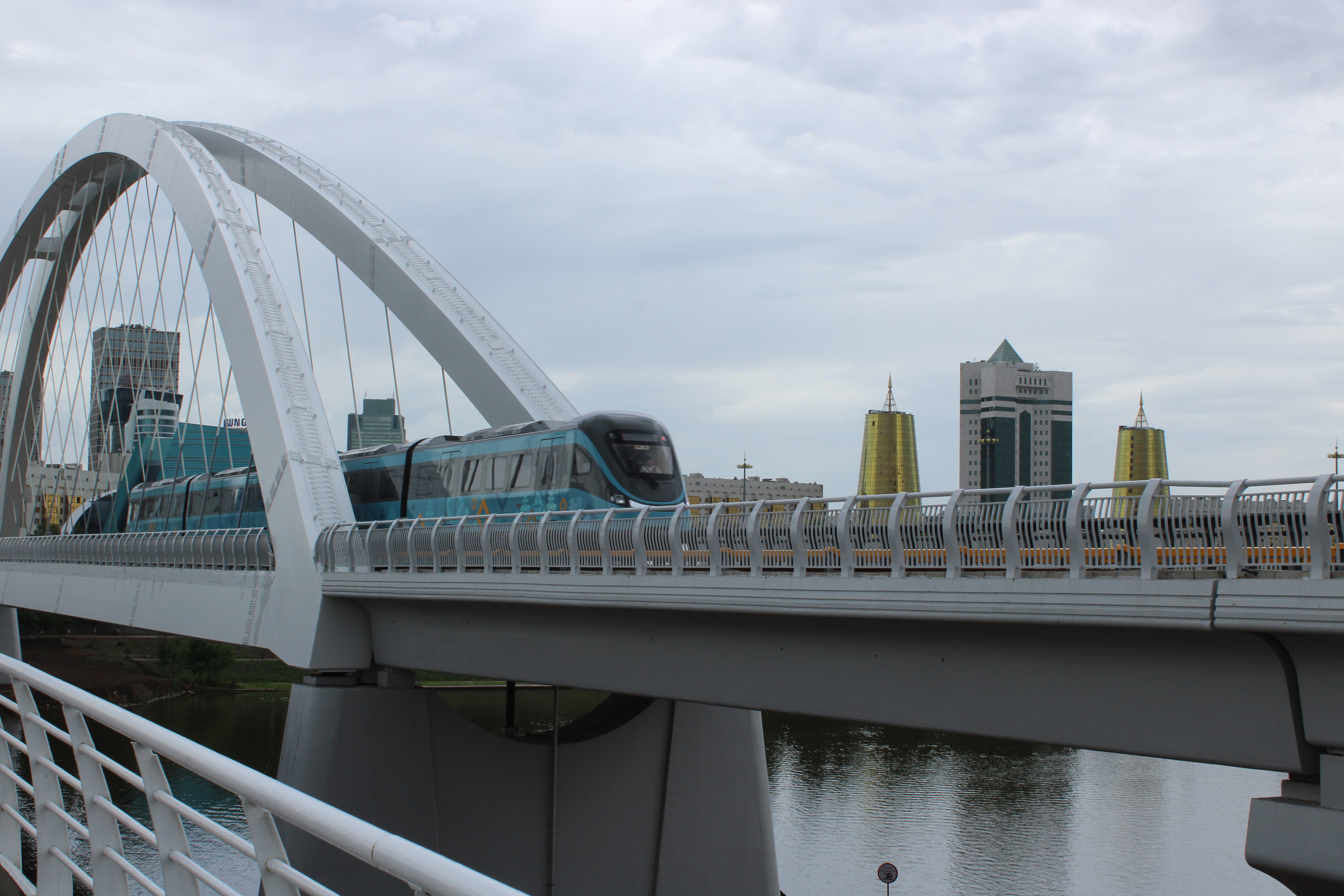
- Astana Light Metro train

Overview
- Locale: Astana, Kazakhstan
- Transit type: Light metro
- Number of lines: 1
- Number of stations: 18
- Daily ridership: 65-75 thousand people
- Website: https://cts.gov.kz/

Operation
- Began operation: 16 May 2026; 6 months ago
- Operator: City Transportation Systems
- Number of vehicles: 15 trains, 4 in reserve
- Train length: 4 carriages per trainset

Technical
- System length: 22.4 km (13.9 mi)
- Track gauge: 1,435 mm (4 ft 8 1/2 in) standard gauge
- Electrification: 750 V DC from third rail
- Average speed: 50 km/h (31 mph)
- Top speed: 80 km/h (50 mph)

The Astana Light Metro (also known as Tarlan Astana or simply as the Astana LRT), is a light metro system serving Astana, Kazakhstan, with its population of over 1.6 million people. Managed by City Transportation Systems (CTS) (Note: A public company owned by Akimat of the city of Astana.), the network has one line spanning 22.4 kilometres (13.9 mi), with 18 stations.

Construction of the Astana LRT began in 2017, and the system was officially opened on 16 May 2026, later being renamed to Tarlan Astana. The system's sole line extends from the Nursultan Nazarbayev International Airport into the city centre, and then to the Astana-Nurly Zhol station.

== History ==
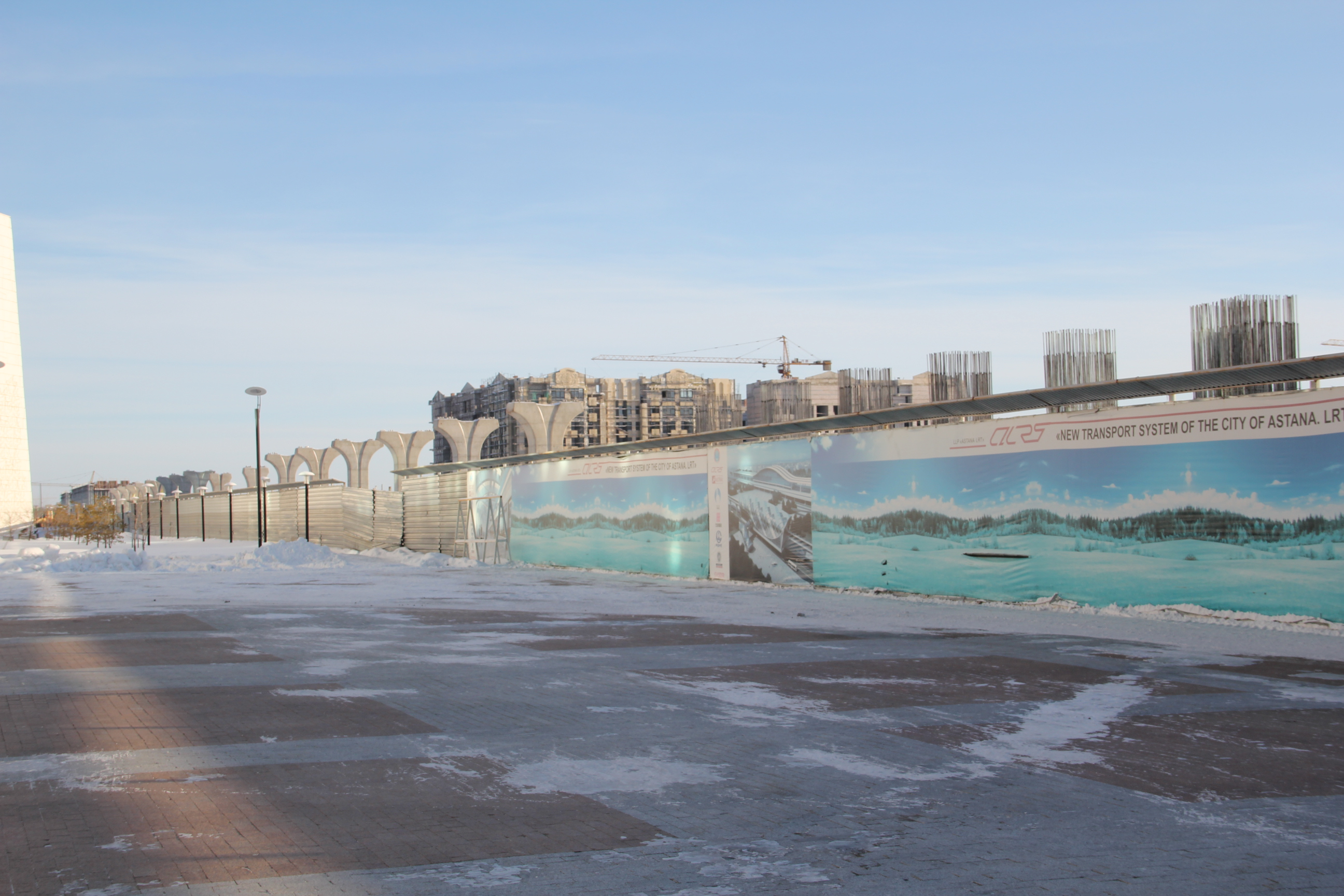
Astana Light Metro station under construction in 2019

The initial plan was termed "LRT", yet images show light metro trains. Construction should have finished roughly about the same time as the Almaty Metro, which was estimated for 2010. However, completion was postponed several times, in 2011 completion was scheduled to coincide with Expo 2017 and by October 2017 the first stage was planned to be commissioned in December 2019. Project authority Astana LRT LLP signed an agreement with a consortium of China Railway International Group (subsidiary of China Railway Group Limited) and Beijing State-Owned Assets Management Co for construction of the first phase of the capital's urban rail project on 7 May 2015. Construction began in May 2017.

The light metro is part of former president Nursultan Nazarbayev's Kazakhstan 2030 economic plan to transform Kazakhstan into an economic power.

Video renders of the proposed system show the lines built on viaducts running adjacent to roads, with enclosed stations offering heating and ventilation systems to protect passengers from the extreme weather variations in the city.

The Chinese company constructing the project went bankrupt in early 2019, causing the city government to order an indefinite suspension of the project. The half-built remnants of the project became a prominent symbol of corruption within the country.

In 2023, construction restarted and the system was planned to open by 2024-2025. In 2024, it was clarified that the system was planned to open in 2025, later postponed to May 2026. The Astana light metro will feature ground and elevated stations, with 18 stations spanning a total length of 22.4 kilometers. It will also launch 19 units of rolling stock, each capable of carrying 652 passengers. In 2025, the first trains from CRRC Tangshan were delivered.

On 16 May 2026, the Astana LRT was opened. The system was renamed to Tarlan Astana on 2 July 2026.

== Line 1 ==
The 21.5 kilometres (13.4 mi) North-South route links Nursultan Nazarbayev International Airport with Astana-Nurly Zhol station via the modern "Left Bank" area of the city center. The line has 18 stops and one depot. Capacity is estimated to be 146,000 people per day.

A total of 19 trains run on the line at average intervals of 4–5 minutes. Each train has a capacity of 652 passengers.

In August 2025, the Astana City Administration approved the final names for Line 1 stations. Previously, all stations were numbered from 101 to 118, with the first digit indicating the line and the other digits numbering the stations in sequential order, starting from the Airport station.

Station number	Station name	Station name (Kazakh)
101	Airport	Әуежай / Äuejai
102	Atameken	Атамекен / Atameken
103	Yesil	Есіл / Esıl
104	Mangilik El	Мәңгілік ел / Mäñgılık el
105	Astana Zhuldyzy	Астана жұлдызы / Astana jūldyzy
106	Nura	Нұра / Nūra
107	University	Университет / Universitet
108	Uly Dala	Ұлы дала / Ūly dala
109	Astana Arena	Астана Арена / Astana Arena
110	Martial Arts Palace	Жекпе-жек сарайы / Jekpe-jek saraiy
111	Syganak	Сығанақ / Syğanaq
112	Baiterek	Бәйтерек / Bäyterek
113	House of Ministries	Министрліктер үйі / Minisrtrlıkter üiı
114	National Museum	Ұлттық Мұражай / Ūlttyq Mūrajai
115	Theatre	Театр / Teatr
116	Myngzhyldyk Alley	Мыңжылдық аллеясы / Myñjyldyq alleiasy
117	Zhibek Zholy	Жібек жолы / Jıbek joly
118	Nurly Zhol	Нұрлы жол / Nūrly jol

== Further phases ==
=== Phase 2 ===
An extension to Qosshy is currently under construction.

Future plans (part of phase 2) could also extend the metro to Astana-1 station and the Zhagalau residential district.

== See also ==
- Almaty Metro
- List of rapid transit systems
