= Sary-Arka Airport =

Airport in Kazakhstan

Sary-Arka Airport Saryarqa äuejaiy

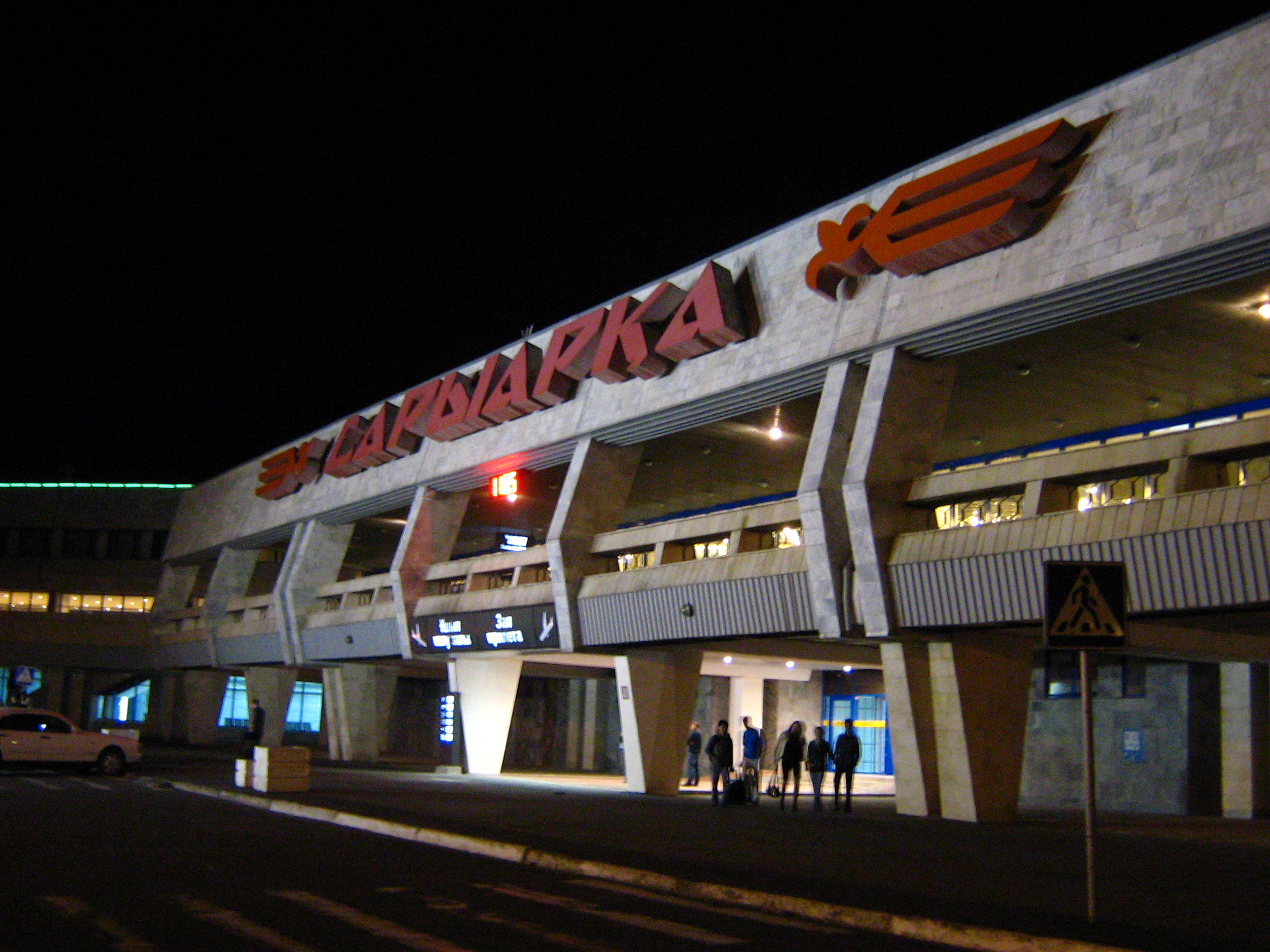
- IATA: KGF; ICAO: UAKK

Summary
- Airport type: Public
- Owner: Sky Service LLP
- Operator: JSC “Sary-Arka International Airport”
- Serves: Qarağandy
- Location: 24 km (15 mi) SE of Qarağandy, Kazakhstan
- Focus city for: FlyArystan
- Elevation AMSL: 538 m (1,765 ft)
- Coordinates: 49°40′17″N 073°20′11″E
- Website: www.kgf.aero

Maps
- Location in Kazakhstan
- Interactive map of Sary-Arka Airport

Runways
Direction	Length		Surface
Direction	m	ft	Surface
05/23	3,602	11,818	Reinforced Concrete

Statistics
- Passengers: 301 784
- Source: AIP Kazakhstan

Sary-Arka Airport (Kazakh: Saryarqa äuejaiy) (IATA: KGF, ICAO: UAKK) is an international airport which serves the city of Karaganda and its satellite town in Kazakhstan. It is located 24 km (15 mi) southeast of the city.

== History ==
The initial airport was built in 1934, on a site at the edge of the city centre, and moved further out to its current location in 1944. The old terminal building on Shturman Street still stands, now occupied as a bus terminal and a market for car parts.

In 1980 it underwent major reconstructions, including the construction of a new terminal building and the modernization of the runway. This made the landing of heavier aircraft possible, which allowed a gateway to many new destinations in the Soviet Union.

In 1992, the airport was granted international status. It has become an independent joint stock company after the separation from JSC "Karagandaavia" in 1997. It is not related to Saryarka – Steppe and Lakes of Northern Kazakhstan on the World Heritage List.

Sary-Arka Airport is home to the 610th Air Base of the Armed Forces of the Republic of Kazakhstan, one of four fast jet bases in the country with MiG-31s, Su-27s and Su-25s.

The airport is usually used as a staging area, from which the returning crewmembers of the International Space Station are flown to their respective home bases at the Yuri Gagarin Cosmonaut Training Center, the Johnson Space Center or the European Astronaut Centre following a traditional welcome ceremony upon landing in their Soyuz (spacecraft) capsule.

== Accidents ==
- On October 27, 1959, near the Karaganda airport in difficult weather conditions (below the airfield's meteorological minimum), a Li-2 plane crashed. One passenger was killed and seven were injured.
- On November 29, 2010, a Boeing 747 of the Hong Kong airline Cathay Pacific, flying from Amsterdam to Hong Kong, made an emergency landing at the airport. The cause of the emergency landing was depressurization of the cabin.

== Airlines and destinations ==
=== Passenger ===
Airlines	Destinations
Aeroflot	Moscow–Sheremetyevo
FlyArystan	Almaty
S7 Airlines	Novosibirsk
SCAT Airlines	Aqtau, Jezqazğan, Oral, Öskemen, Semei
Sunday Airlines	Seasonal charter: Antalya

=== Cargo ===
Airlines	Destinations
MSC Air Cargo	Hong Kong, Liege
My Freighter	Tashkent
SF Airlines	Liege, Yantai
