= Astana-Saparjai-1 Bus Station =

Bus station in Astana, Kazakhstan

Astana-Saparjai-1 Астана-Сапаржай-1

General information
- Location: Astana; Kazakhstan
- Coordinates: 51.19405°N 71.41162°E
- System: Bus station

Construction
- Parking: yes

Other information
- Website: saparzhai.kz

History
- Opened: 1989
Location

The Astana-Saparjai-1 (Kazakh: Астана-Сапаржай-1) is a bus station located in the city of Astana. The bus station serves more than 60 intercity, interregional and international routes daily, which carry about 1 million passengers a year.

== History ==
The Astana-Saparjai-1 building was built in 1989. In 2009–2010, the facades and interior decoration of the building were reconstructed. Today, the bus station of the city of Astana represents an extensive infrastructure in the field of providing services to the population, not only for the sale of tickets for interdistrict, interregional, intercity and international bus transportation, but also for all related services. There are 7 cash desks (1 round-the-clock) for the sale of tickets, a dispatch office, an information desk, a hand luggage storage room, lounges, six ATMs of various banks, cafes and canteens, a hairdresser, kiosks for the sale of periodicals and related goods.

In November 2017, it was reported that the bus station was sold for 1 billion tenge.

In October 2018, the Astana-Saparjai-2 was opened inside the Nur-Sultan-Nurly Jol station.
