= Esil District, Astana =

Coordinates: 51.087°N 71.447°E

Esil District Есіл Ауданы
- District of Astana
- Interactive map of Esil District; Есіл Ауданы
- Country: Kazakhstan
- Municipality: Astana

Government
  - Akim: Asylbek Yesenbayev

Area
  - Total: 31,179 ha (77,040 acres)

Population (2014)
  - Total: 375,938
  - Density: 31,179/km^{2} (80,750/sq mi)
- District number: 3
- Website: Official website

Esil District (Kazakh: Есіл Ауданы, Esıl audany; Russian: Район Есиль), is an administrative subdivision of the city of Astana, Kazakhstan.
