= VietJet Qazaqstan =

Kazakh airline based in Astana

Vietjet Qazaqstan
IATA	ICAO	Call sign
IQ	QAZ	SAMRUK
- Founded: 1 April 2015
- Commenced operations: 27 August 2015
- Hubs: Nursultan Nazarbayev International Airport
- Frequent-flyer program: IQ Bonus
- Fleet size: 5
- Parent company: Samruk-Kazyna – 49% Central Asia Aviation Holdings Limited – 49% Kazasia Holdings Limited – 2%
- Headquarters: Astana, Kazakhstan
- Key people: Adilbek Umraliyev, Chairman of the Management Board
- Revenue: about KZT 21 billion (2024)
- Website: vietjetqazaqstan.kz

Vietjet Qazaqstan (Qazaq Air JSC, «QAZAQ AIR» АҚ), before 2025 did business as Qazaq Air is a Kazakh airline based in Astana and operating from Nursultan Nazarbayev International Airport. It operates scheduled domestic and international services, as well as subsidised routes under a state programme.

The airline was established in 2015 by the Samruk-Kazyna sovereign wealth fund. In 2025, the privatisation of the company was completed: the shareholders of QAZAQ AIR became Samruk-Kazyna JSC with 49%, Central Asia Aviation Holdings Limited with 49%, and Kazasia Holdings Limited with 2%. Central Asia Aviation Holdings Limited is part of Vietnam's Sovico Group, making it the second overseas subsidiary of VietJet Air, after Thai VietJet.

== History ==
=== 2015–2018 ===
In April 2015, Samruk-Kazyna National Welfare Fund established Qazaq Air JSC as a subsidiary company. The airline was presented on 6 July 2015 in Astana.

The first scheduled passenger flight took place on 27 August 2015 on the Almaty–Astana route. During the first five days of operations, more than 900 passengers used the airline's services. By 21 October 2015, the airline had carried more than 10,000 passengers.

In 2017, more than 250,000 passengers used the airline's services, a 53.6% increase compared with the previous year.

In July 2017, the airline operated its first international flight: under a charter programme, it began flights from Almaty to Issyk-Kul International Airport in Tamchy, Kyrgyzstan.

In November 2018, Qazaq Air became the third Kazakh carrier to pass the International Air Transport Association's IATA Operational Safety Audit (IOSA) and receive IOSA certification. According to the company's annual report, in 2018 Qazaq Air carried 307,000 passengers, operated 5,451 flights, and its route network included 14 routes linking 12 cities in Kazakhstan.

=== 2019–2023 ===
According to results for the first half of 2019, the airline reported that it had carried more than 920,000 passengers since the start of operations.

In July 2019, Qazaq Air became the 293rd member of the International Air Transport Association.

In November 2019, the airline successfully completed its second IOSA audit, and its IOSA certificate and operator status were extended until November 2021.

In 2023, Samruk-Kazyna began the privatisation process for Qazaq Air. According to The Tenge, the airline was planned to be sold in the second half of 2023; however, the tender was declared unsuccessful and the sale was postponed to 2024. The publication also stated that Vietnam's SOVICO Group had shown interest in acquiring the carrier.

=== 2024–2026 ===
On 24 December 2024, Samruk-Kazyna signed a share purchase agreement for Qazaq Air with a consortium of investors consisting of Central Asia Aviation Holdings Limited and Kazasia Holdings Limited; the agreement entered into force on 27 December 2024 after the adoption of Government of Kazakhstan Resolution No. 1130. According to Samruk-Kazyna, Central Asia Aviation Holdings Limited was part of Sovico Group, the main shareholder of VietJet Air.

Samruk-Kazyna stated that at the time of the transaction Qazaq Air operated five Bombardier Dash 8-Q400 aircraft, carried more than 600,000 passengers in 2024, generated about KZT 21 billion in revenue, and recorded EBITDA of more than KZT 2 billion.

On 6 May 2025, Samruk-Kazyna announced the completion of the transfer of a controlling stake in Qazaq Air to a consortium of strategic investors consisting of Central Asia Aviation Holdings Limited and Kazasia Holdings Limited. According to Kapital.kz, 51% of the airline's shares were transferred to the investor consortium, while Samruk-Kazyna's stake decreased to 49%.

On the same day, Vietjet Air and Qazaq Air signed a strategic partnership agreement. According to Samruk-Kazyna, Vietjet Qazaqstan was created on the Qazaq Air platform, while Sovico Group and VietJet Air were expected to participate in its management and operations. The airline's official materials use the wording "QAZAQ AIR JSC, operating under the VIETJET QAZAQSTAN trademark".

In October 2025, the airline announced the launch of direct flights from Astana to Bishkek and Samarkand.

In 2025, VietJet Qazaqstan marked the 10th anniversary of its operations. According to the company, during those ten years the airline carried more than 4 million passengers and operated more than 66,000 flights; in 2024, around 601,000 passengers used the carrier's services.

In April 2026, the Federal Air Transport Agency of Russia published a note from the Embassy of Kazakhstan in Russia designating VietJet Qazaqstan as a scheduled carrier on the routes Aktobe–Kazan, Astana–Novosibirsk, Astana–Omsk, and Astana–Yekaterinburg, with up to seven weekly flights on each route.

According to an extract from the Russian Federal Tax Service dated 9 July 2026, the airline's board of directors decided on 27 February 2026 to establish a representative office in the Russian Federation. The office was accredited on 29 April 2026 following a decision of the Federal Air Transport Agency dated 15 April 2026, and was registered in Yekaterinburg at 55A Bakhchivandzhi Street, premises 3. The head of the representative office was listed as Aleksandr Dmitrievich Nechipurenko.

On 9 July 2026, Kazakh media, citing the airline's press service, reported that flights on the Astana–Omsk–Astana route had been suspended from 9 to 20 July 2026 because of temporary restrictions on the use of airspace in the Omsk area.

== Destinations ==
As of 2026, according to the official Vietjet Qazaqstan website, the airline operates scheduled domestic and international flights, as well as subsidised routes under a state programme.

== Fleet ==
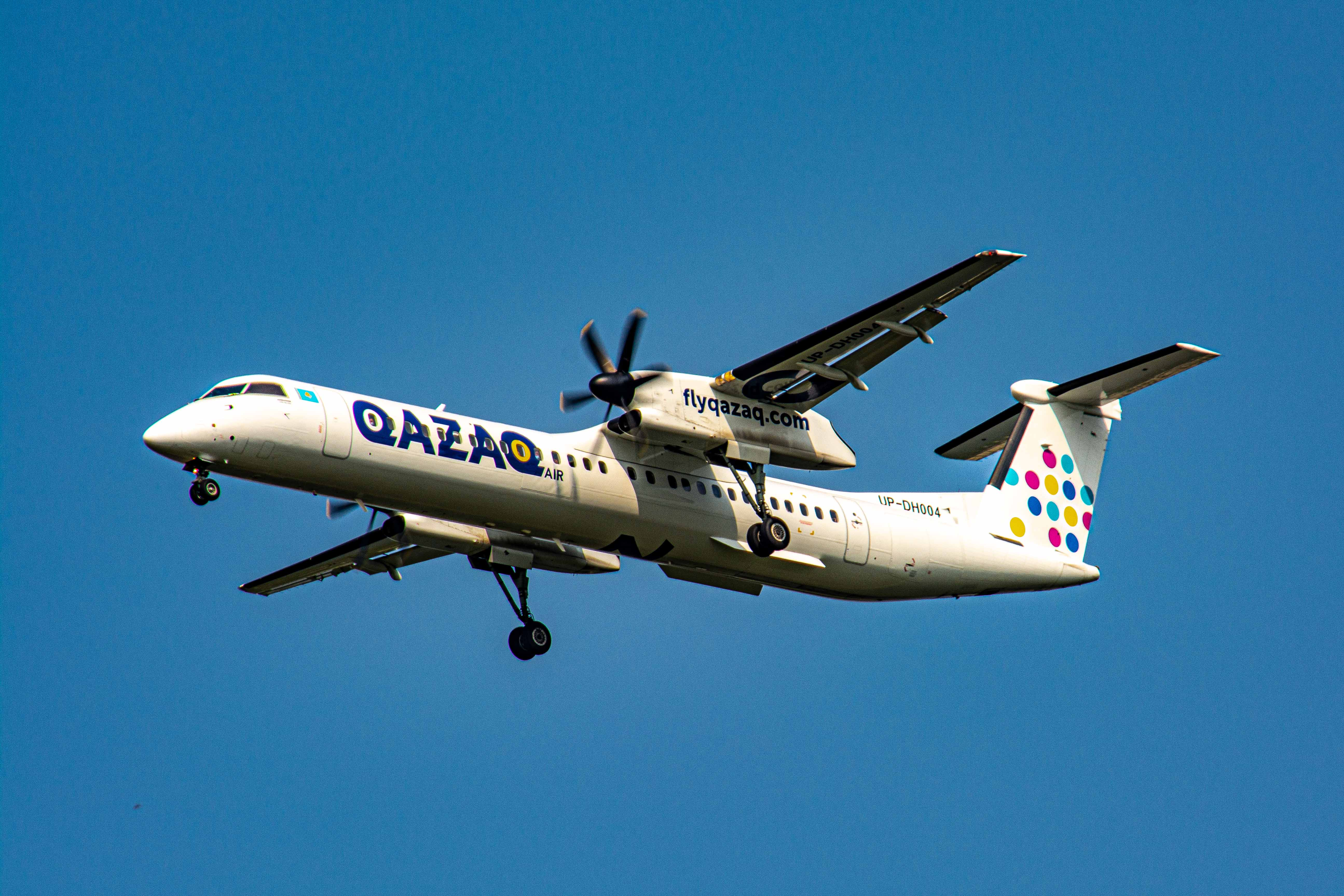
De Havilland Dash 8-400

As of July 2026, VietJet Qazaqstan operates the following aircraft:

VietJet Qazaqstan fleet
Aircraft	In service	Orders	Passengers	Notes
De Havilland Canada Dash 8-400	5	—	76	
De Havilland Canada Dash 8-400	5	—	78	
De Havilland Canada Dash 8-400	5	—	86	
Boeing 737 MAX 8	—	20	TBA	
Total	5	20		

=== Fleet development ===
The first three aircraft were taken on operating lease from Falcon Aviation Services LLC of Abu Dhabi, United Arab Emirates.

In December 2017, an agreement was signed for the acquisition of two new De Havilland Dash 8-400 aircraft. Their delivery took place in the first half of 2019.

Meanwhile, the carrier's Vietnamese owners confirmed plans to assign 20 Boeing 737 MAX 8 from VietJet Air's order book to the Qazaqstan affiliate from 2026.

== Ownership ==
From April 2015 to May 2025, 100% of VietJet Qazaqstan's shares were owned by the state through the Samruk-Kazyna fund. In May 2025, the airline's privatisation was completed: the shareholders became Samruk-Kazyna JSC with 49%, Central Asia Aviation Holdings Limited with 49%, and Kazasia Holdings Limited with 2%.

According to VietJet Qazaqstan, Central Asia Aviation Holdings Limited is part of Vietnam's Sovico Group.
