= FlyArystan =

Airline of Kazakhstan

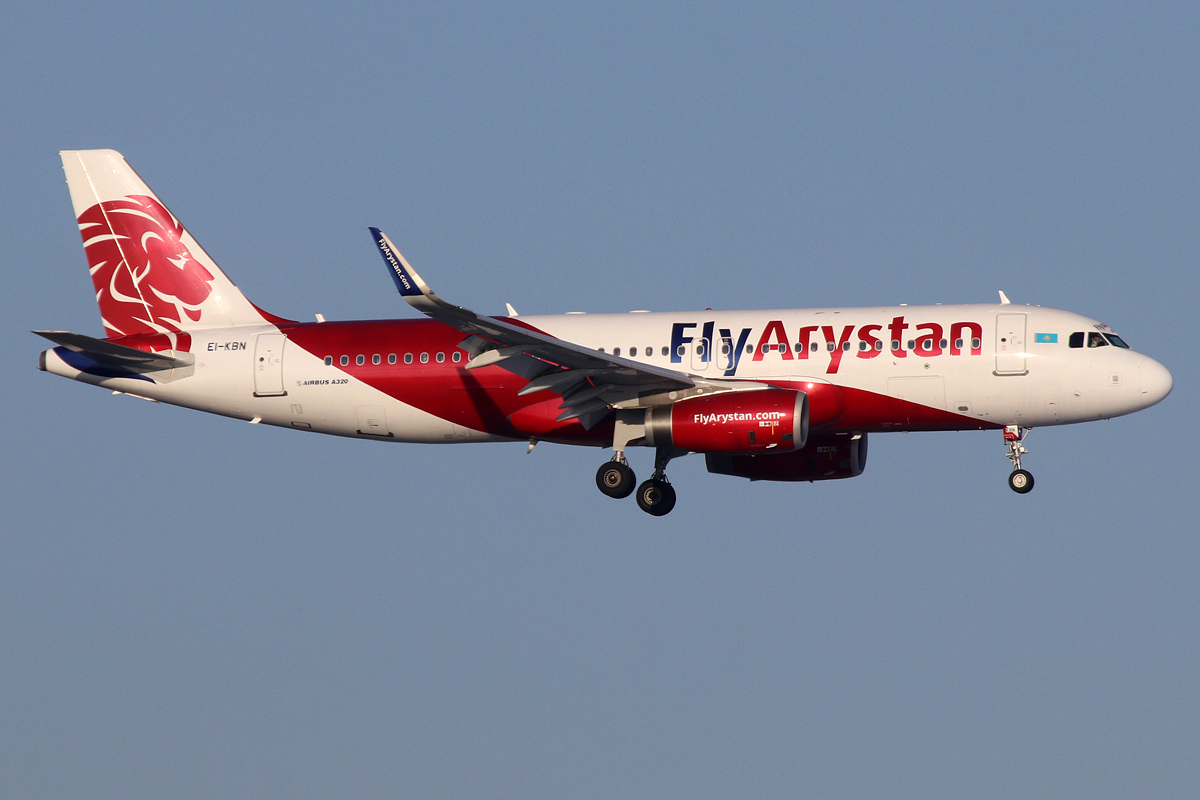
- FlyArystan Airbus A320-200
IATA	ICAO	Call sign
FS	AYN	ARYSTAN
- Founded: 1 November 2018 (7 years ago) (as a division of Air Astana)
- Commenced operations: 29 March 2019 (7 years ago)
- Operating bases: Almaty International Airport; Aqtau International Airport; Nursultan Nazarbayev International Airport
- Fleet size: 28
- Destinations: 24
- Parent company: Air Astana
- Headquarters: Almaty, Kazakhstan
- Key people: Johan Eidhagen, CEO; Pom Warakorn Komutanont, Operations Director
- Website: www.flyarystan.com

FlyArystan is a low-cost airline headquartered in Almaty, Kazakhstan. It is the country's first low-cost carrier. The company's slogan is Say YES! to Travel.

It is the wholly owned low-cost subsidiary of Air Astana. The airline commenced operations in May 2019 and operates a comprehensive network of low fare flights on a modern fleet of Airbus A320 aircraft. Its route network includes both domestic flights as well as international routes.

In 2024, FlyArystan received its air operator certificate (AOC) from the Aviation Administration of Kazakhstan (AAK), confirming compliance with Kazakh aviation legislation and international operational standards. This enables FlyArystan to obtain its own IATA code to expand its presence in foreign markets and cooperate with other airlines. FlyArystan is a 100% subsidiary of Air Astana JSC.

== History ==
FlyArystan's sales commenced on 29 March 2019 on its website. The airline first flew on 1 May 2019 with services from its hub airport, Almaty International Airport.

Peter Foster, president and CEO of Air Astana, said at a press conference in Almaty on 6 November 2018 that FlyArystan is "on the one hand a response to demand for lower airfares in a more competitive local market, on the other, a recognition of the huge opportunity for low cost air travel throughout Central Asia and the Caucasus".

== Awards ==
In November 2022, FlyArystan was recognised as a 4-star airline by SkyTrax. FlyArystan is one of only 12 LCCs to be assessed as 4-star quality.

In July 2023, FlyArystan was voted "Best LCC Central Asia & CIS" by SkyTrax.

In June 2024, the World Airline Awards 2024 ceremony was held at the Fairmont Windsor Park Hotel in London, where the airline was once again awarded "Best Lowcoster in Central Asia and CIS".

== Destinations ==
FlyArystan destinations as of May 2026

FlyArystan is Kazakhstan's largest domestic airline, offering more flights and more seats than any other airline. The route network includes 24 destinations, including 14 domestic and 10 international. FlyArystan has aircraft bases in Almaty, Astana and Aqtau. FlyArystan commenced international flights in 2019 and has since offered flights from multiple points in Kazakhstan as well as abroad.

=== Codeshare agreements ===
FlyArystan has codeshare agreements with the following airlines:

- Air Astana

== Fleet ==
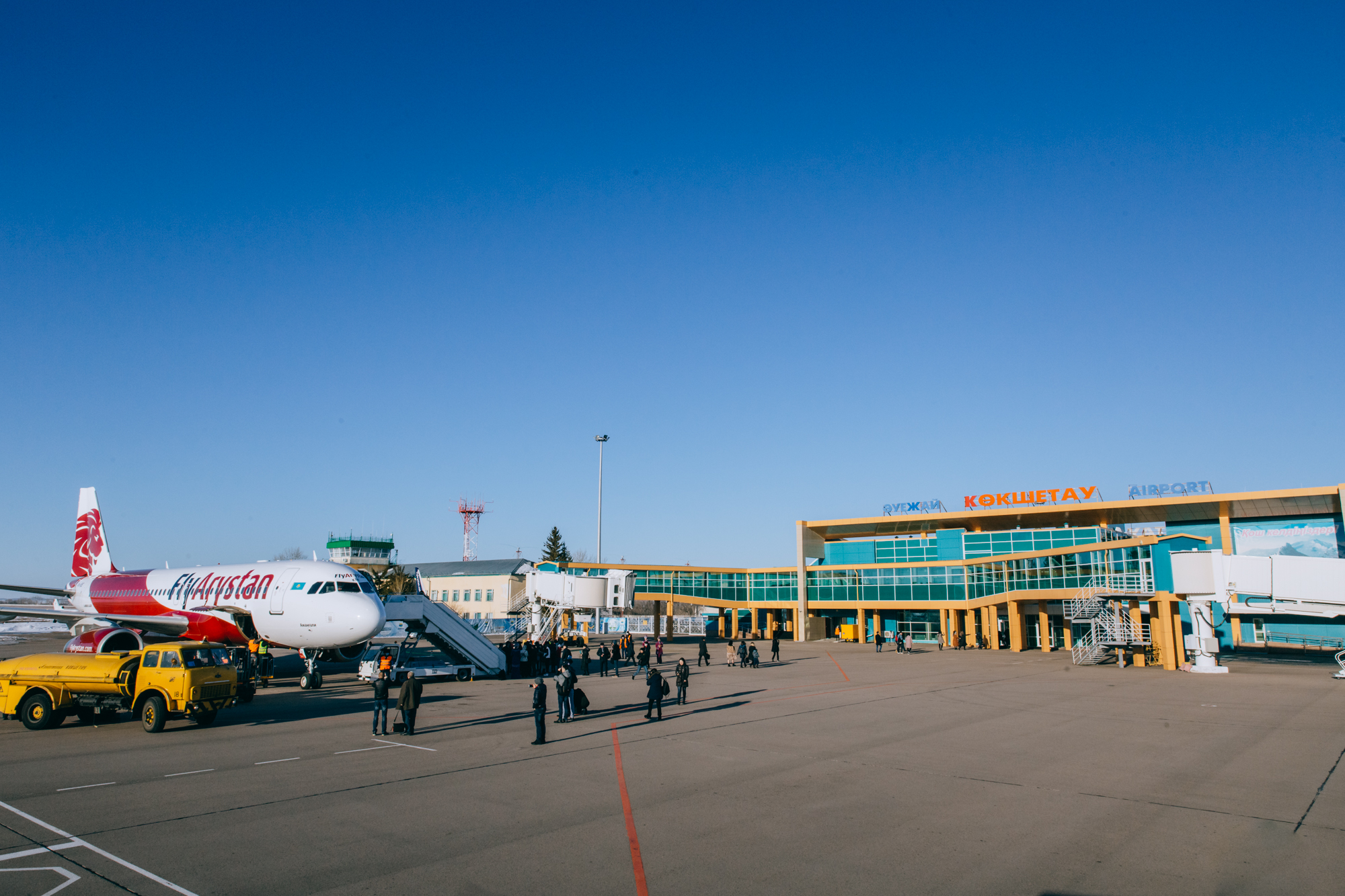
Airbus A320-200 aircraft on stands at Kokshetau International Airport

=== Current fleet ===
As of July 2026, FlyArystan operates the following aircraft:

FlyArystan fleet
Aircraft	In service	Orders	Seats	Notes
Airbus A320-200	15	—	180	Eight aircraft were transferred from Air Astana.
Airbus A320neo	13	1	188	
Total	28	1		

FlyArystan operates a standardised fleet of Airbus A320 aircraft. FlyArystan's A320neos have a 188 seat layout to maximise seat capacity in line with LCC principles.

=== Fleet development ===
FlyArystan placed a letter of intent at the Dubai Airshow 2019 for 30 Boeing 737 MAX 8 aircraft which has not been turned into an actual order yet.

=== Former fleet ===
As of August 2025, FlyArystan operated 15 Airbus A320 and 13 Airbus A320neo.

== Milestones ==
In 2022, self-service passenger terminals called iJan were installed at Almaty International Airport for the first time. These allow passengers to self-check-in for flights, check in baggage, and buy additional services, avoiding queues and saving time. Similar self-service terminals are now installed in 14 cities across Kazakhstan where the airline operates.

In 2023, the airline introduced a new baggage drop-off technology (BagJan) at Almaty International Airport, ensuring a faster and more convenient self-service process.

== Corporate social responsibility ==
In 2023, the airline supported the families of those who died in a devastating fire in the Abay region by offering free flights to the relatives of the deceased and the firefighters involved in disaster relief, as well as for transporting humanitarian aid. The previous summer, the airline contributed to the reforestation efforts in the Abay region following the catastrophe. The company purchased and delivered 570 packs or 280 liters of peat substrate for growing plants at the state forest nature reserve "Semey Ormany." This supply of peat substrate was used for 1,325,000 seedlings with a closed root system, intended for spring planting in 2024, covering a total area of 315.5 hectares.

In 2023, FlyArystan officially launched the corporate social responsibility project "Komek", aimed at supporting socially vulnerable groups by providing discounts on commercial flights.
