= List of airlines of Kyrgyzstan =

This is a list of aircraft operators which are licensed by the Kyrgyz civil aviation authorities and which have been assigned domestic codes by the Kyrgyzstan authorities.

== Active ==
=== Passenger airlines ===
| Airline | Image | IATA | ICAO | Callsign | Founded | Notes |
|---|---|---|---|---|---|---|
| Aero Nomad Airlines | | KA | ANK | AERO NOMAD | 2021 | |
| Asman Airlines | | MN | KGN | MANAS BIRD | 2023 | |
| Avia Traffic Company | | YK | AVJ | ATOMIC | 2003 | |
| Sky FRU | | | KGZ | SKY FRU | 2023 | |

=== Cargo airlines ===
| Airline | Image | IATA | ICAO | Callsign | Founded | Notes |
|---|---|---|---|---|---|---|
| Aerostan | | KW | BSC | BIGSHOT | 2004 | |
| New Way Cargo Airlines | | | NWY | NEW WAY CARGO | 2022 | |

== Defunct ==
| Airline | Image | IATA | ICAO | Callsign | Founded | Ceased operations | Notes |
|---|---|---|---|---|---|---|---|
| ACI Airlines | | | | | 2006 | 2008 | |
| Air Bishkek | | KR | EAA | EASTOK | 2011 | 2016 | |
| Air Kyrgyzstan | | QH | LYN | ALTYN AVIA | 2013 | 2018 | |
| Air Manas | | ZM | MBB | AIR MANAS | 2006 | 2022 | |
| Altyn Air | | QH | LYN | ALTYN AVIA | 2001 | 2006 | Rebranded as Kyrgyzstan Air Company |
| Anikay Air | | | AKF | ANIKAY | 2003 | 2007 | |
| Asia Alpha Airways | | OD | SAL | | 2006 | 2008 | |
| Asian Air | | KJ | AAZ | | 2009 | 2012 | |
| Botir-Avia | | B8 | BTR | BOTIR-AVIA | 2000 | 2008 | |
| Eastok Avia | | E4 | EAA | EASTOK | 2006 | 2011 | Rebranded as Air Bishkek |
| Esen Air | | K9 | ESD | ESEN AIR | 2006 | 2008 | |
| Galaxy Air | | 70 | GAL | GALAXY | 2006 | 2010 | |
| Golden Rule Airlines | | | GRS | GOLDEN RULE | 2003 | 2011 | |
| Intal Air | | | INL | INTAL AVIA | 2005 | 2008 | |
| Inter Trans Avia | | Y5 | ITD | SEITEK | 2002 | 2004 | |
| Itek Air | | GI | IKA | ITEK-AIR | 1999 | 2010 | |
| KAS Air | | KW | KSD | AEROKAS | 2001 | 2002 | |
| Kyrgyz Air | | KT | KAF | | 2002 | 2003 | |
| Kyrgyz Trans Avia | | 6K | KTC | DINARA | 2009 | 2013 | |
| Kyrgyz Airways | | KR | EAA | | 2006 | 2011 | Rebranded as Air Bishkek |
| Kyrgyz Airways | | KH | KGZ | BERMET | 2004 | 2006 | |
| Kyrgyzstan Air Company | | QH | LYN | | 2006 | 2013 | Rebranded as Air Kyrgyzstan |
| Kyrgyzstan Airlines | | R8 | KGA | KYRGYZ | 1992 | 2005 | Merged into Altyn Air |
| Kyrgyz International Airlines | | KO | KYL | KYRMAL | 2002 | 2005 | |
| Manas Air | | MV | KGM | MANAS AIR | 2000 | 2001 | |
| MAXavia | | | MAI | MAX AVIA | 2006 | 2009 | |
| Moalem Aviation | | 2Y | AMA | MOALEM | 2021 | 2026 | |
| Osh-Avia | | | OSH | OSH AVIA | 2006 | 2008 | |
| Pegasus Asia | | ZM | MBB | | 2013 | 2015 | Rebranded as Air Manas |
| Phoenix Aviation | | P3 | PHG | PHENIX GROUP | 1998 | 2005 | Rebranded as AVE.com to operate jet equipment under the UAE registry. Listed on the European Union ban list on 22 March 2006. |
| Quadro-Aero | | | QVR | | 2000 | 2004 | |
| Reem Air | | V4 | REK | | 2004 | 2007 | |
| S Group International | | | IND | INTER GROUP | 2006 | 2015 | |
| Sky Bishkek | | GY | BIS | | 2012 | 2015 | |
| Sky KG Airlines | | Y3 | KGK | KYRGYZ SKY | 2004 | 2021 | Currently operates non-flight services rather than an airline. |
| Sky Gate International Aviation | | | SGD | AIR BISHKEK | 2003 | 2008 | Registered in Kyrgyzstan with base at Amman, Jordan. |
| Sky Way Air | | | SAB | SKY ASIA | 2004 | 2019 | |
| Star of Asia | | | SSA | | 1992 | 1995 | |
| Sun Light Airlines | | 6L | SUH | | 2004 | 2006 | |
| Tenir Airlines | | | TEB | | 2005 | 2009 | |
| TezJet Airlines | | K9 | TEZ | TEZJET | 2013 | 2026 | |
| Trast-Aero | | S5 | TSJ | | 2005 | 2010 | |

== See also ==
- List of airports in Kyrgyzstan
- List of defunct airlines of Asia
- List of airlines
