= Voronezh International Airport =

Airport in Voronezh, Russia

Voronezh Peter the Great International Airport Международный аэропорт Воронеж имени Петра Первого

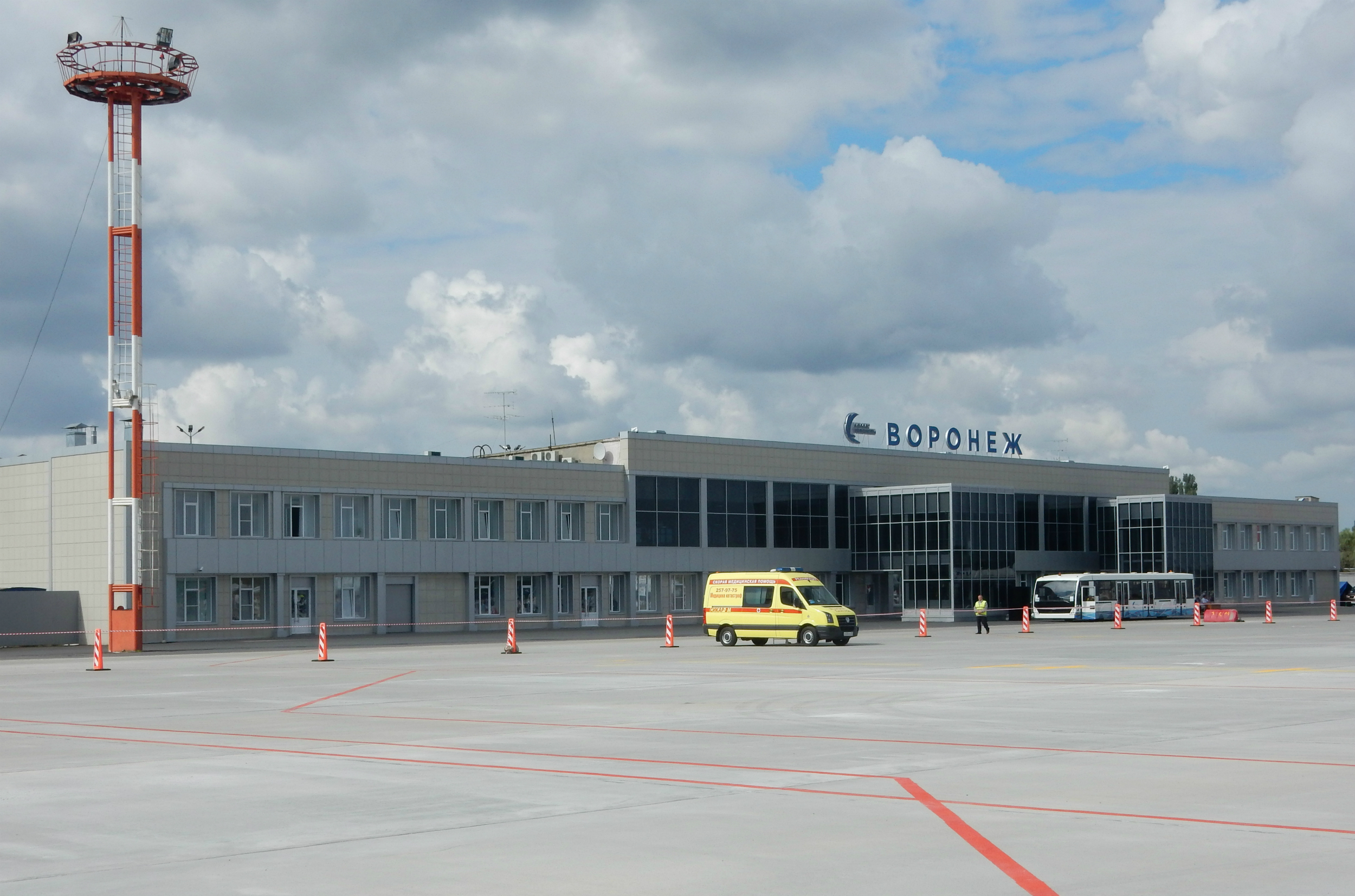
- IATA: VOZ; ICAO: UUOO; LID: ВРН

Summary
- Airport type: International
- Owner: Profi (Novaport)
- Operator: Limited Liability Company Management Company «AVIASERVICE»
- Serves: Voronezh, Lipetsk, Kursk, Tambov, Oryol, Belgorod
- Location: Voronezh
- Opened: 9 February 1933; 93 years ago
- Passenger services ceased: February 24, 2022
- Hub for: RusLine
- Elevation AMSL: 515 ft / 157 m
- Coordinates: 51°48′54″N 39°13′48″E
- Website: Official website

Map
- Airport Voronezh VOZ (European Russia) VOZ (Voronezh Oblast) VOZ (Earth)

Runways
| Direction | Length | | Surface |
| Direction | m | ft | Surface |
|---|---|---|---|
| 12/30 | 2,300 | 7,545 | Asphalt concrete |

Statistics (2021)
- Number of passengers: ▲809 455
- Work Time: 24h/7d
- Airport phone: +7 (473) 210-78-78

Voronezh Peter the Great Airport (Russian: Международный аэропорт Воронеж имени Петра Первого) (IATA: VOZ, ICAO: UUOO) is an international airport in Russia located 11 km north of Voronezh. It serves Voronezh Oblast as well as the surrounding Lipetsk, Tambov, Oryol, Belgorod, and Kursk Oblasts.

== History ==
On 10 July 1933, open regular air service on the route Moscow - Voronezh - Stalingrad on multi-seat aircraft K-5.

In 1971, a new airport terminal was built and delivered.

In the 1980s and up to the collapse of the Soviet Union, the airport served 1.1 million passengers a year. In 2018, the airport handled 770,000 passengers.

In 2008, the reconstruction of the airport was initiated. The plans for the renovation included the replacement cover and lengthening the runway to 2,600 meters (extension beyond 2,600 m was difficult, because on the one hand the airport borders on the federal highway M4, and on the other due to a ravine in front of the Voronezh Reservoir).

Replacement of perimeter fence, water and drainage systems, upgrading lighting equipment, reconstruction of the apron and taxiways and the airport complex. Since 2010, after the end of major works on the runway, its technical characteristics allows handling Boeing 737 and Airbus A320 size airliners. Currently, the reconstruction of the airfield complex of the second stage, which is expanding its capacity for reception and service of most modern passenger and luxury types of aircraft.

== Airlines and destinations ==
| Airlines | Destinations |
|---|---|
| Aeroflot | Moscow–Sheremetyevo |
| Avia Traffic Company | Bishkek |
| Azimuth | Mineralnye Vody |
| Azur Air | Seasonal charter: Dubai-Al Maktoum |
| Ikar | Yerevan; Seasonal: Simferopol; Seasonal charter: Phuket |
| NordStar Airlines | Seasonal: Norilsk, Sochi |
| Nordwind Airlines | Seasonal charter: Antalya |
| Pobeda | Moscow–Vnukovo, Saint Petersburg |
| Red Wings Airlines | Yekaterinburg |
| Rossiya Airlines | Seasonal charter: Antalya |
| RusLine | Kazan, Moscow–Vnukovo, Saint Petersburg, Sochi, Yekaterinburg |
| S7 Airlines | Moscow–Domodedovo, Novosibirsk |
| Smartavia | Saint Petersburg |
| Turkish Airlines | Istanbul |
| Ural Airlines | Dushanbe, Moscow–Zhukovsky, Osh |
| Uzbekistan Airways | Tashkent |

== Support intermodal transportation of passengers ==
Voronezh Airport supports intermodal free transportation of passengers for 13 regions of the country. Any passenger is delivered to the airport for free.

== See also ==
- List of airports in Russia
