= Sky FRU =

Kyrgyz airline

IATA	ICAO	Call sign
—	KGZ	Sky Fru
- Founded: 2023 (3 years ago)
- Commenced operations: 2024 (2 years ago)
- AOC #: 63
- Operating bases: Manas International Airport
- Focus cities: Bishkek, Osh & Issyk-Kul
- Fleet size: 01
- Destinations: 03
- Parent company: Avia Traffic Company
- Headquarters: Shevchenko st. 96, Bishkek, Kyrgyzstan
- Key people: Yan Ekimovsky (Director)
- Website: skyfru.kg/en

Sky FRU (Russian: ОсОО «Скай ФРУ») is a low cost scheduled domestic airline of Kyrgyzstan and is the subsidiary of Avia Traffic Company. Headquartered in Bishkek, Kyrgyzstan, it was founded in 2023 and commenced operations in 2024. It was banned from flying into the EU until 2026 when all Kyrgyzstani airlines were unbanned by the EU.

== History ==
The Limited Liability Company Sky FRU was established in Kyrgyzstan in 2023, and in March 2024, it obtained Operator Certificate No. 63.

On July 1, 2024, Sky FRU launched route connecting Osh and Tamchy.

== Destinations ==
Country	City	Airport	Notes
Kyrgyzstan	Bishkek	Manas International Airport	Hub
Kyrgyzstan	Issyk-Kul	Issyk-Kul International Airport	
Kyrgyzstan	Osh	Osh International Airport	

== Fleet ==
Aircraft	In Fleet	Order	Capacity	Notes
Boeing 737-33A	1	0	148	Identification sign: EX-37012 Date of Manufacture: 21.11.1996
Total	1			

== See also ==
- List of airlines of Kyrgyzstan
