= TezJet Airlines =

Kyrgyzstani airline

TezJet
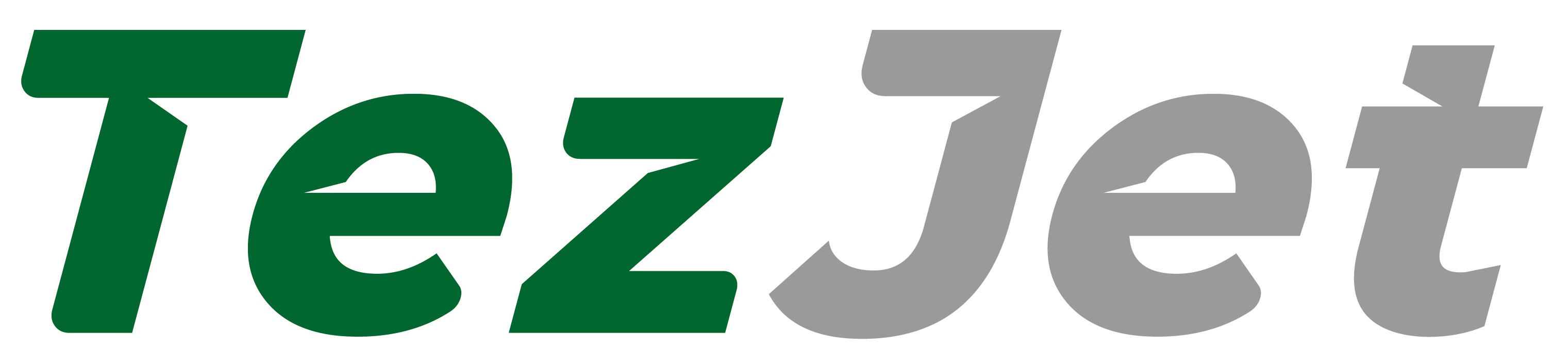

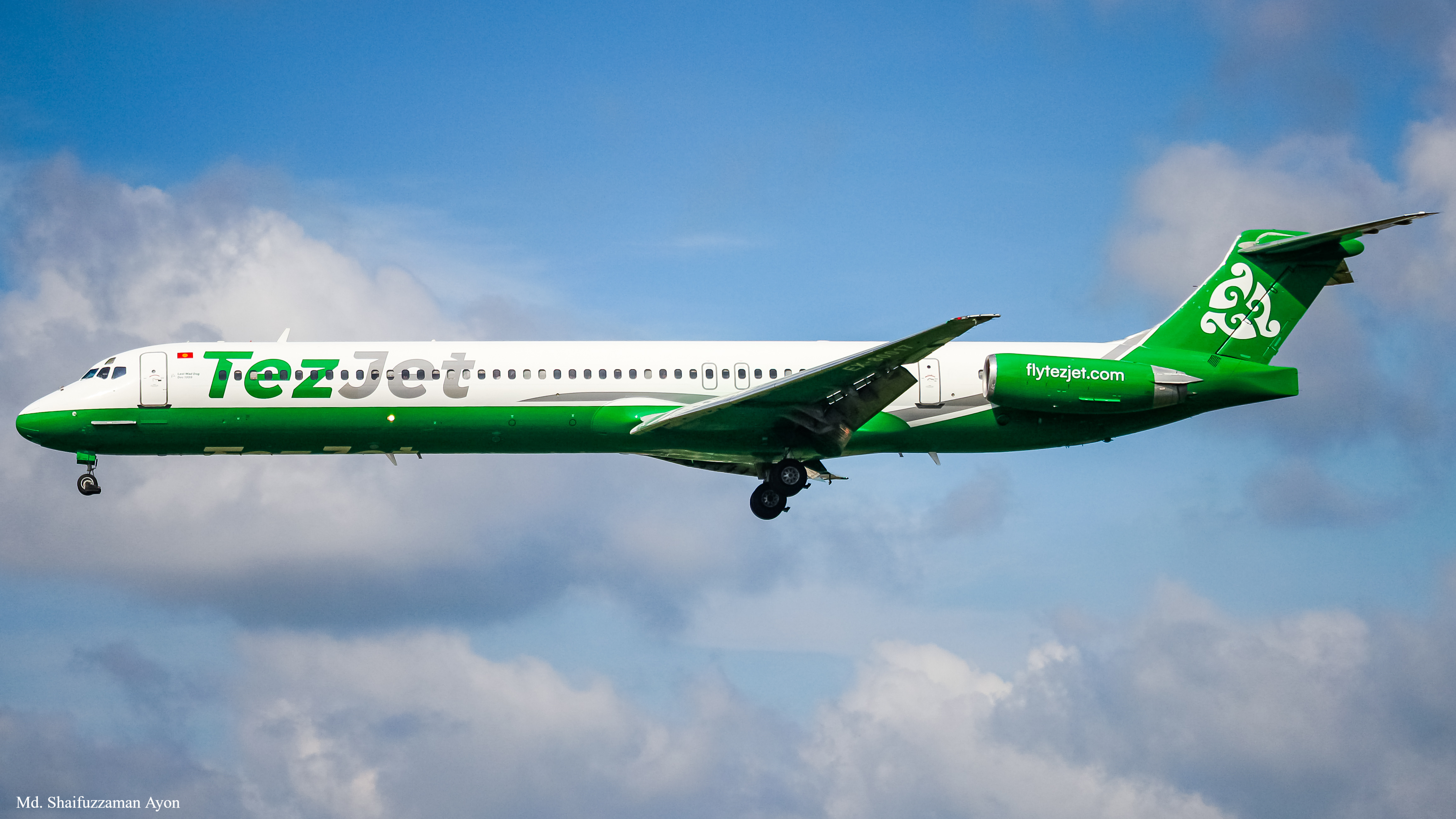
IATA	ICAO	Call sign
K9	TEZ	TEZJET
- Founded: April 23, 2013; 13 years ago
- Commenced operations: August 2014; 12 years ago
- Ceased operations: July 10, 2026; 2 months ago
- Hubs: Manas International Airport
- Fleet size: 4
- Destinations: 7
- Parent company: AKKA Group
- Headquarters: Bishkek, Kyrgyzstan
- Key people: Arun Kumar Singh (President & CEO)
- Website: flytezjet.com

TezJet Airlines (Kyrgyz: «ТЕЗ ДЖЕТ» Жоопкерчилиги чектелген коому) was a Kyrgyz airline, headquartered in Bishkek, Kyrgyz Republic.

It was founded on April 23, 2013, and began scheduled passenger operations in August 2014 after receiving its first BAe 146 aircraft, leased from Avia Traffic Company, from its main hub at Manas International Airport. On July 10, 2026, the State Agency for Civil Aviation of Kyrgyzstan revoked TezJet's air operator's certificate following an inspection of its activities after the incident of Flight 9117.

== Destinations ==
TezJet Airlines formerly flew to destinations throughout Kyrgyzstan, India, and Uzbekistan.

Country	City	Airport	Notes	Refs
India	Delhi	Indira Gandhi International Airport		
Kyrgyzstan	Bishkek	Manas International Airport	Hub	
Kyrgyzstan	Jalal-Abad	Jalal-Abad Airport		
Kyrgyzstan	Osh	Osh Airport		
Kyrgyzstan	Tamchy	Issyk-Kul International Airport		
Russia	Moscow	Moscow Domodedovo Airport		
Uzbekistan	Tashkent	Tashkent International Airport		

== Fleet ==
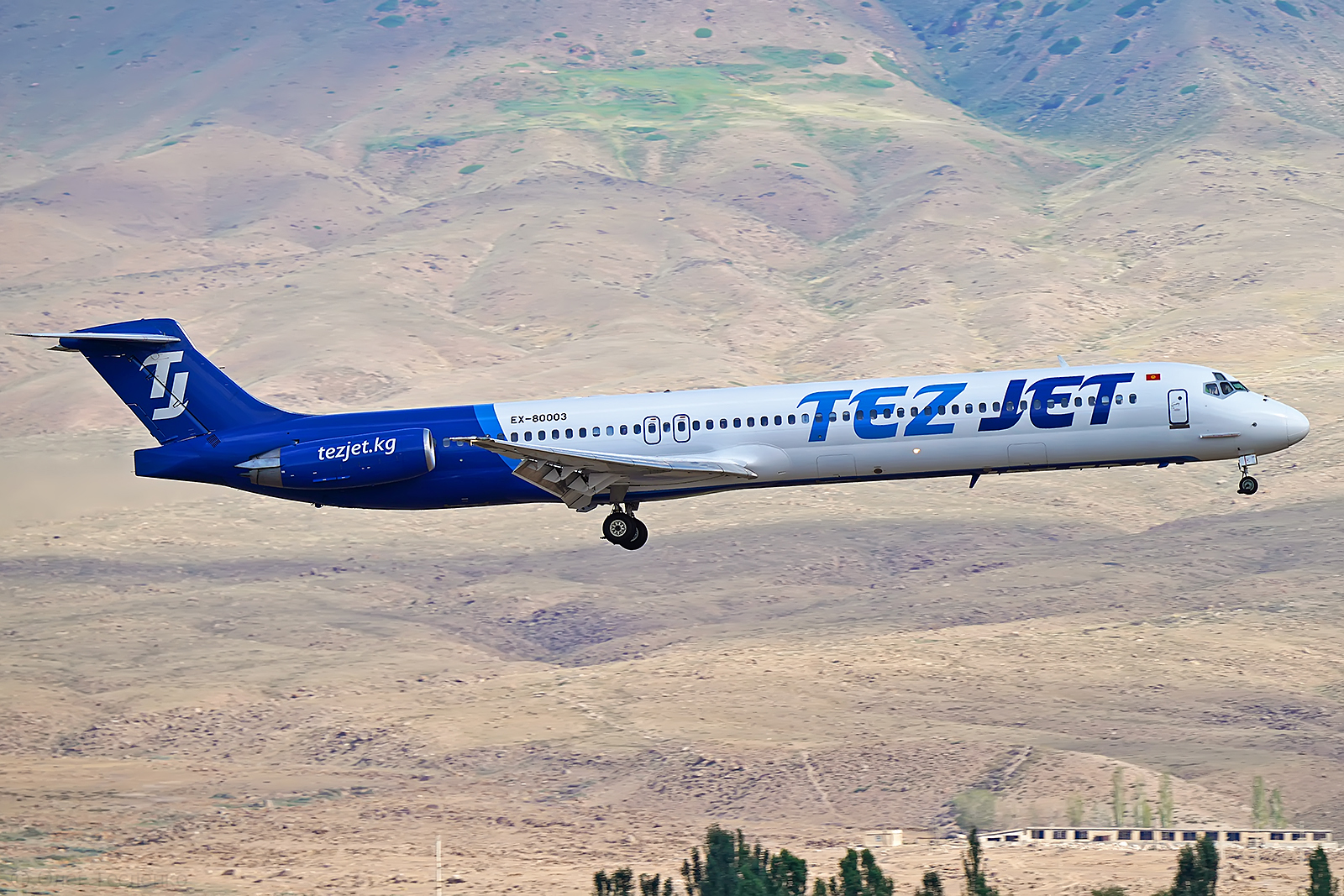
TezJet MD-83

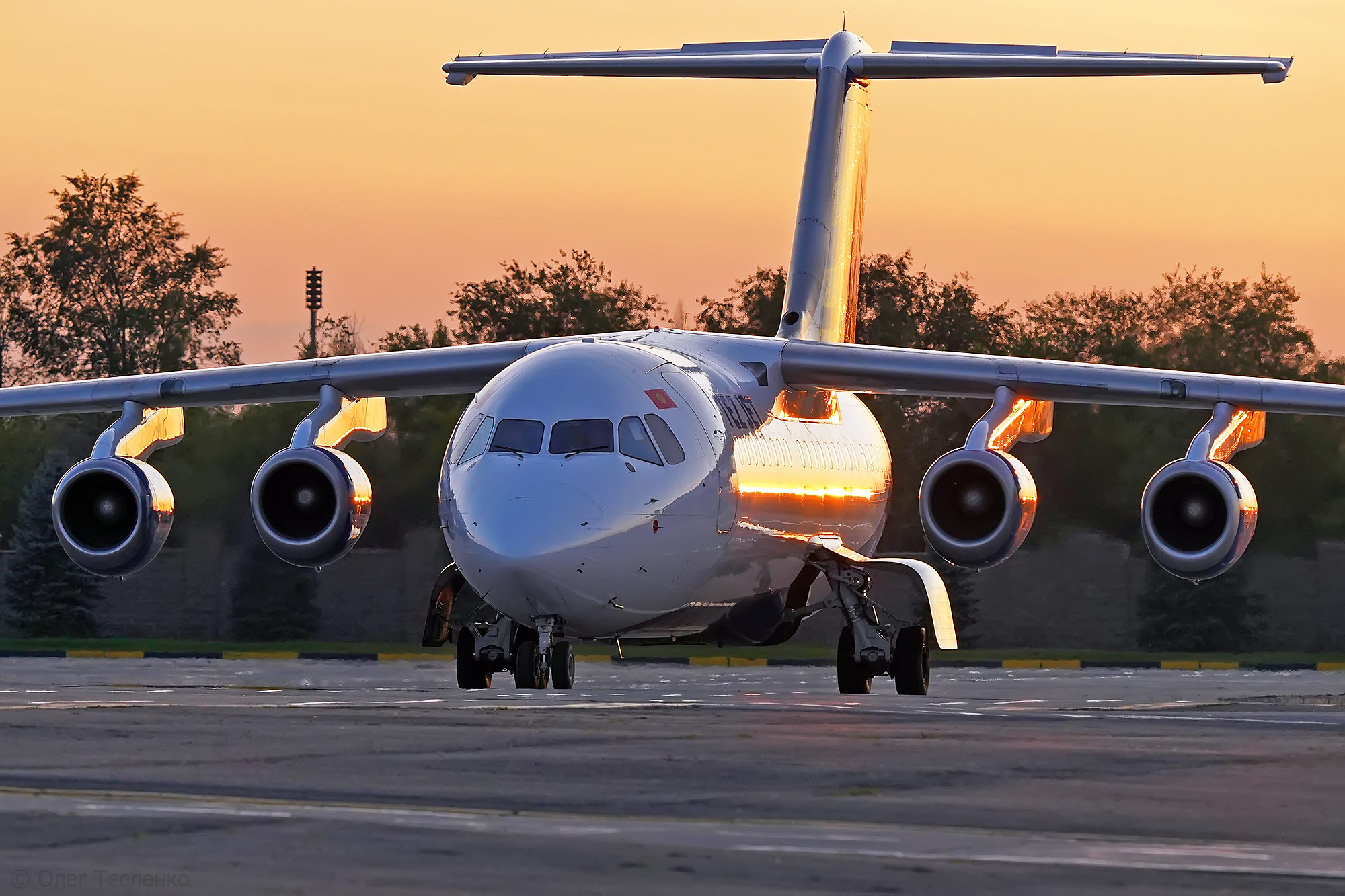
TezJet Avro RJ85

=== Fleet ===
Aircraft	In service	Orders	Passengers	Notes
Avro RJ85	2	—	96	One was damaged as Flight 107.
McDonnell Douglas MD-83	2	—	164	Includes the last MD-80 builtEX-80003 was written off as Flight 9117.
Total	4	—		

== Accidents and incidents ==
- On March 1, 2018, Tezjet Airlines Flight 107, an Avro RJ85 (registered as EX-27005), suffered an uncontained engine failure shortly after taking off from Bishkek's Manas Airport. The crew declared an emergency and safely returned to Manas Airport with no injuries.
- On July 7, 2026, Tezjet Airlines Flight 9117, a McDonnell Douglas MD-83 (registered as EX-80003), had its landing gear collapse while taking off at Bishkek's Manas Airport. The crew immediately aborted the takeoff, and the aircraft was evacuated shortly after. None of the 187 crew and passengers died, but several were injured. The aircraft’s left wing and back tail cone suffered substantial damage.This would result in TezJet's AOC from being revoked.

== See also ==
- List of airlines of Kyrgyzstan
