= Interavia =

Interavia may refer to:

- Interavia Airlines, a Russian airline
- Interavia (magazine), a monthly aerospace magazine published in English, French, German and Spanish
- Interavia I-3, a Russian aerobatic competition airplane

== See also ==
- Inter Trans Avia, a Kyrgyzstani airline
