= AVJ =

AVJ may refer to:

- Avia Traffic Company, ICAO code
- AVJennings, Australian homebuilder
- AVJ Records, indie label, imprint of Average Joes Entertainment
