= Esen Air =

Kyrgyz airline

IATA	ICAO	Call sign
K9	ESD	ESEN AIR
- Founded: 2006
- Ceased operations: 2008
- Hubs: Manas International Airport
- Fleet size: 2
- Headquarters: Bishkek, Kyrgyzstan

Esen Air was an airline based in Bishkek, Kyrgyzstan. It started operations on 10 October 2006 and operated domestic and international charter services. The main base was at Manas International Airport, Bishkek.

== Destinations ==
- Kyrgyzstan
  - Bishkek (Manas International Airport)
  - Karakol (Karakol Airport)

== Fleet ==
The Esen Air fleet included the following aircraft (at June 2009):

- 2 Boeing 737–200 operated by Avia Traffic Company
