= Air Bishkek =

Kyrgyz airline

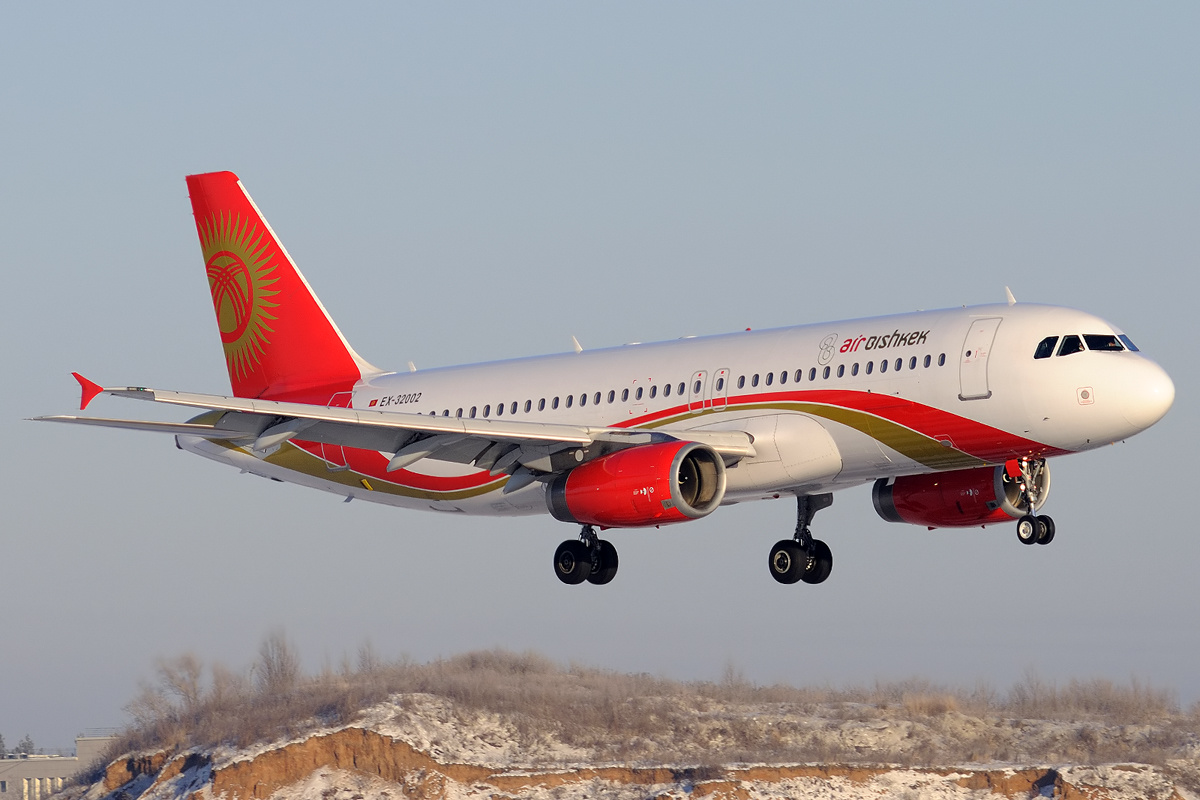
- The Airbus A320-200 of Air Bishkek lands at Domodedovo Airport in 2012.
IATA	ICAO	Call sign
KR	EAA	EASTOK
- Founded: 2006 (as Eastok Avia); 2010 (renamed Kyrgyz Airways); 2011 (renamed Air Bishkek)
- Ceased operations: 2016
- Operating bases: Manas International Airport
- Fleet size: 1
- Destinations: 9
- Headquarters: Bishkek, Kyrgyzstan
- Key people: Perelygina Vera - General Director
- Website: airbishkek.kg

Air Bishkek (Russian: Эйр Бишкек) was an airline based in Bishkek, Kyrgyzstan, with its operational base at Manas International Airport. It was founded as Eastok Avia (E4/EAA) in 2006 and renamed to Kyrgyz Airways. In 2011 the airline was again rebranded into Air Bishkek. Due to alleged poor safety standards in Kyrgyzstan, the airline has been included in the List of air carriers banned in the European Union since 12 October 2006. The airline stopped operating in February 2016 after experiencing financial difficulties. As of June 2016, its Air Operator Certificate has been suspended.

== Destinations ==
Air Bishkek operated flights to the following destinations:

China
Ürümqi – Ürümqi Diwopu International Airport
Kyrgyzstan
Bishkek – Manas International Airport (base)
Osh – Osh Airport (base)
Russia
Irkutsk – International Airport Irkutsk
Moscow – Moscow Domodedovo Airport
Surgut – Surgut International Airport
Belgorod - Belgorod International Airport
Novosibirsk – Tolmachevo Airport
Yekaterinburg - Koltsovo Airport

== Fleet ==
The Air Bishkek fleet consists of the following aircraft (as of August 2016):

Air Bishkek fleet
Aircraft	In fleet	Order	Passengers	Notes
Airbus A320-200	1	0	174	
Total	1	0		

=== Maintenance ===
- Kyrgyz Airways contracted Turkish Technic under a maintenance services agreement for its Boeing B737-300 for May 2010.

== Frequent flyer program ==
In 2010 Air Bishkek became the first airline in Kyrgyzstan to introduce a frequent flyer program, which it named Belek Bonus, after the Kyrgyz word for 'gift'.
