= Osh-Avia =

| IATA | ICAO | Call sign |
|---|---|---|
| - | OSH | - |
- Founded: 2006
- Ceased operations: 2008
- Hubs: Osh Airport
- Destinations: 2
- Headquarters: Osh, Kyrgyzstan

Osh-Avia was a charter airline based in Osh (Osh Airport) in Kyrgyzstan.

The airline was on the air carriers banned in the European Union.

== Services ==
Services operated by Osh-Avia included the following destinations:

- Bishkek (Manas International Airport)
- Osh (Osh Airport).
