= Aero Nomad Airlines =

International airline of Kyrgyzstan

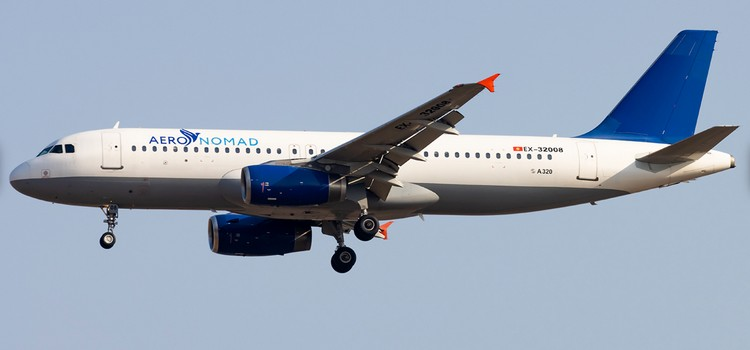
- Aero Nomad Airbus A320
IATA	ICAO	Call sign
KA	ANK	AERO NOMAD
- Founded: 2021; 5 years ago
- Commenced operations: 19 November 2021; 4 years ago
- Hubs: Manas International Airport
- Secondary hubs: Osh Airport
- Fleet size: 3
- Destinations: 9
- Headquarters: Bishkek
- Website: aeronomad.kg

Aero Nomad Airlines LLC is a Kyrgyz airline based in Bishkek. It was established in 2021, and began operations in November 2021 with its first flight out of Kyrgyzstan to Delhi, the capital of India. It has two hubs: Bishkek, as its primary hub, and Osh, as its secondary hub. It was banned from flying into the EU, the ban was lifted on June 2026.

== History ==
The airline was incorporated in 2020, and got its first Airbus A320-200 in October 2021. It received the air operator's certificate (AOC) from the Civil Aviation Department of Kyrgyzstan on 5 November 2021, and began operations with its first flight outside the country to Delhi on 19 November 2021. The airline plans to gradually expand operations in existing countries and will operate to new countries in the future.

In October 2025, the airline received its first widebody aircraft, and Airbus A330-200 registered as EX-33002. As of end of October, the plane is currently parked in Bishkek.

== Destinations ==
As of March 2025, the airline operates the following destinations:

Country	City	Airport	Notes
China	Kashgar	Kashgar Laining International Airport	
China	Ürümqi	Ürümqi Tianshan International Airport	
India	Delhi	Indira Gandhi International Airport	
India	Kolkata	Netaji Subhas Chandra Bose International Airport	Seasonal charter
Kyrgyzstan	Bishkek	Manas International Airport	Hub
Kyrgyzstan	Tamchy	Issyk-Kul International Airport	Terminated
Kyrgyzstan	Osh	Osh Airport	Hub
Pakistan	Islamabad	Islamabad International Airport	
Pakistan	Lahore	Allama Iqbal International Airport	
Russia	Krasnoyarsk	Krasnoyarsk International Airport	Terminated
Russia	Moscow	Vnukovo International Airport	
Russia	Novosibirsk	Tolmachevo Airport	Seasonal
Russia	Surgut	Farman Salmanov Surgut Airport	
Thailand	Phuket	Phuket International Airport	Seasonal charter
Turkey	Istanbul	Istanbul Airport	Terminated
Uzbekistan	Tashkent	Islam Karimov Tashkent International Airport	
Vietnam	Cam Ranh	Nha Trang International Airport	Seasonal charter
Vietnam	Phú Quốc	Phu Quoc International Airport	Seasonal charter

== Fleet ==
=== Current fleet ===
As of July 2026, Aero Nomad operates the following aircraft:

Aero Nomad Airlines fleet
Aircraft	In service	Orders	Passengers	Notes
Airbus A320	2	—	180	
Airbus A330-200	1	—	—	
Total	3	—		

=== Former fleet ===
As of August 2025, Aero Nomad Airlines operated 2 Airbus A320 and 1 Airbus A330-200.

== See also ==
- List of airlines of Kyrgyzstan
