= Sky Bishkek =

IATA	ICAO	Call sign
GY	BIS	–
- Founded: 2012
- Ceased operations: 2015
- Hubs: Manas International Airport
- Fleet size: 1
- Destinations: 3
- Headquarters: Bishkek, Kyrgyzstan
- Website: www.skybishkek.kg

Sky Bishkek was a regional airline based in Bishkek, Kyrgyzstan. Its main base was Manas International Airport.

== Destinations ==
Sky Bishkek served the following domestic destinations:

- Batken – Batken Airport
- Bishkek – Manas International Airport base
- Osh – Osh Airport

== Fleet ==
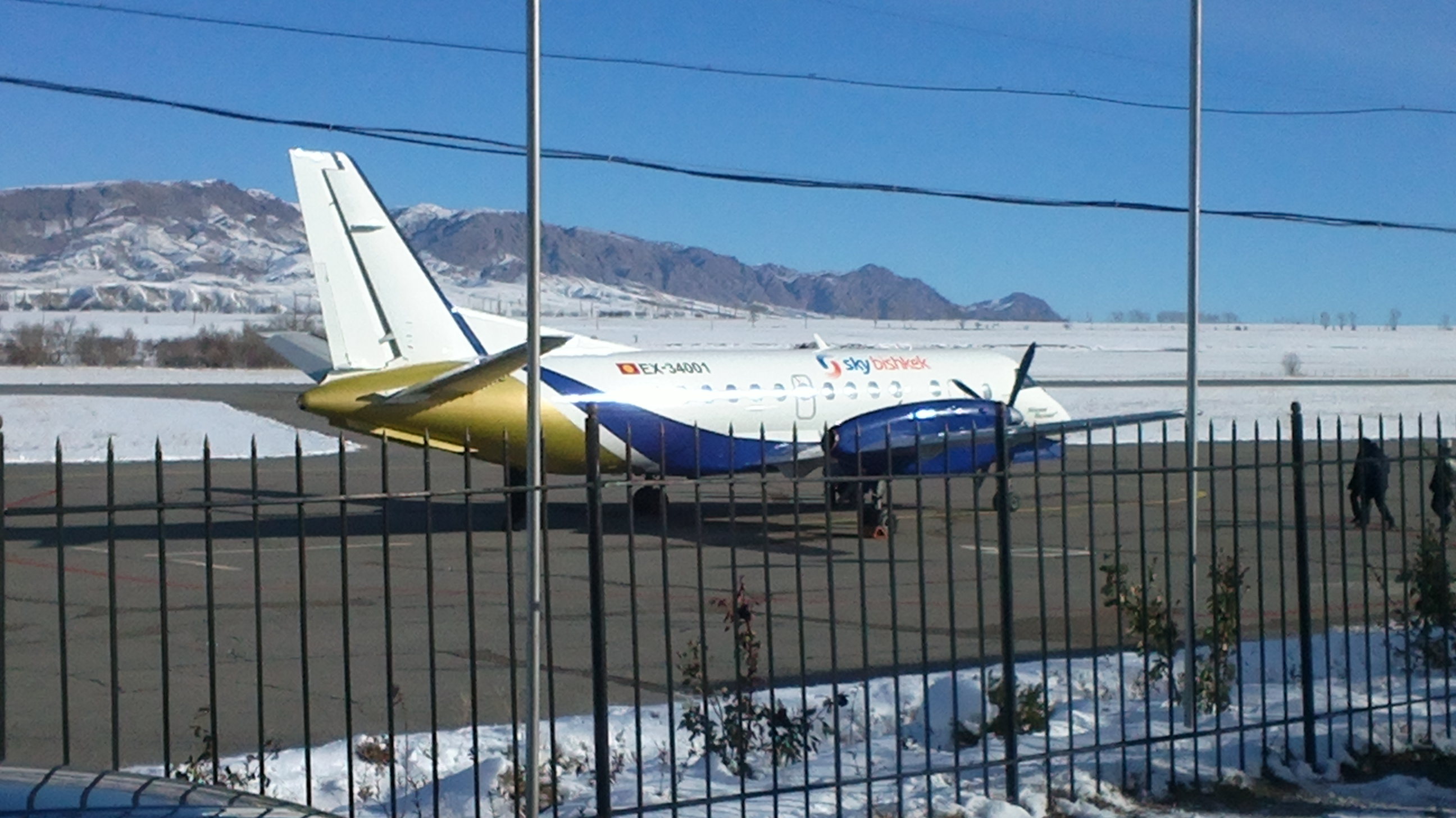
A Sky Bishkek Saab 340 at Isfana Airport.

The Sky Bishkek fleet included the following aircraft:

Sky Bishkek Fleet
Aircraft	In Fleet	Orders	Passengers
Saab 340	1	—	36
Total	1	0	
