= Avia Traffic Company Flight 768 =

2015 aviation accident in Kyrgyzstan

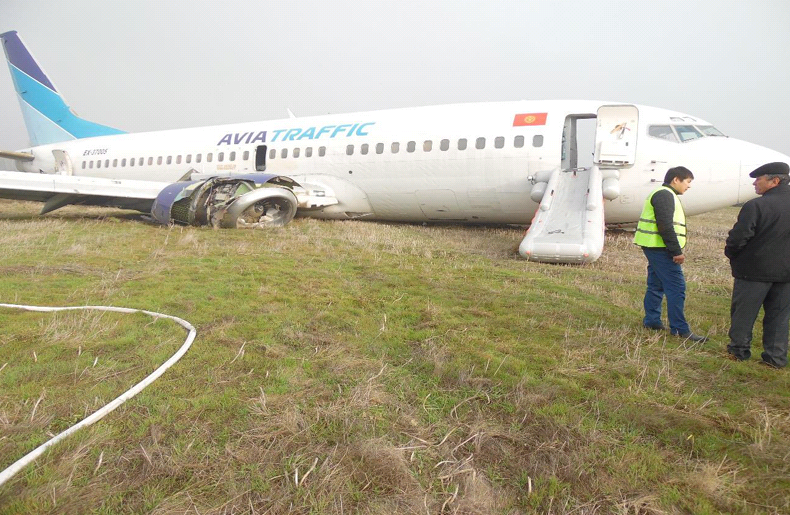
- The aircraft after overrunning the runway

Accident
- Date: 22 November 2015
- Summary: Hard landing, runway excursion
- Site: Osh Airport, Osh, Kyrgyzstan; 40°37′N 72°48′E

Aircraft
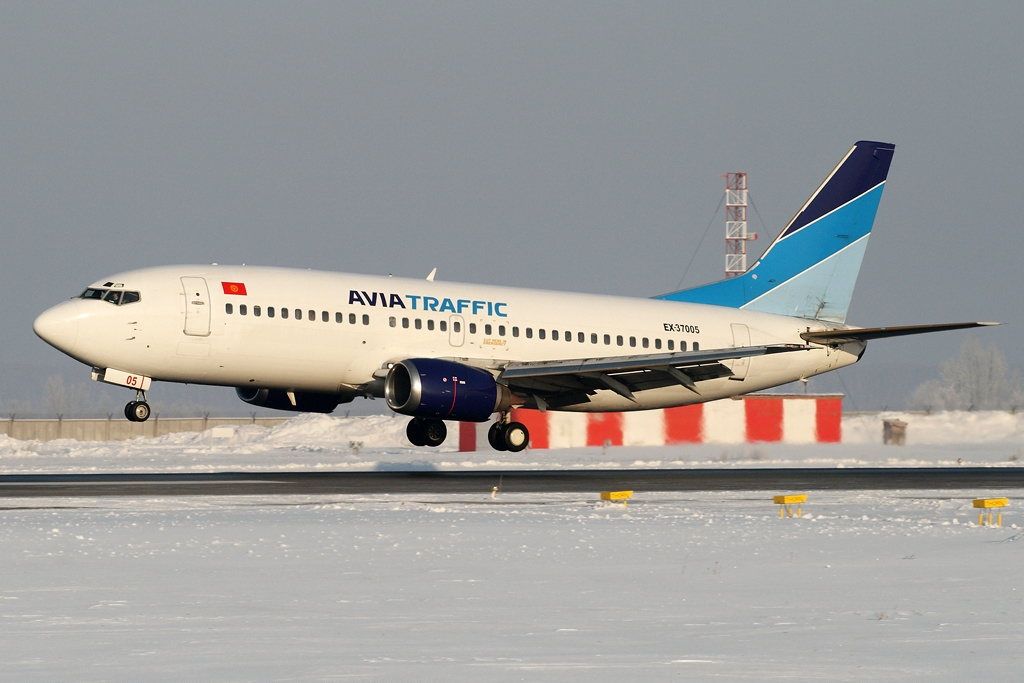
- EX-37005, the aircraft involved in the accident, pictured in 2013
- Aircraft type: Boeing 737-3Y0
- Operator: Avia Traffic Company
- IATA flight No.: YK768
- ICAO flight No.: AVJ768
- Call sign: ATOMIC 768
- Registration: EX-37005
- Flight origin: Bishkek Airport, Kyrgyzstan
- Destination: Osh Airport, Kyrgyzstan
- Occupants: 159
- Passengers: 153
- Crew: 6
- Fatalities: 0
- Injuries: 14
- Survivors: 159

Avia Traffic Company Flight 768 was a scheduled passenger flight from Bishkek to Osh, Kyrgyzstan. On 22 November 2015, the Boeing 737-300 operating the flight was about to land at the Osh Airport but it touched down so hard that both main landing gears sheared off. The aircraft skidded off the runway with the left engine being torn from its mount as well. There were no fatalities in the accident, but 14 people were injured.

== Accident ==
Map of Kyrgyzstan showing the flight origin (Bishkek) and the destination airport (Osh), where the accident occurred

=== Aircraft ===
The aircraft involved was a Boeing 737-3YO, registration EX-37005, originally delivered to Philippine Airlines in 1990; it was later sold to Garuda Indonesia, Citilink and Sama Airlines before being sold to Avia Traffic Company in 2011. The aircraft was 25 years old at the time of the accident. The aircraft was written off after the accident.

=== Accident ===
The aircraft had originally departed Krasnoyarsk Airport Russia for Osh but diverted to Bishkek due to fog in Osh. After the weather improved, the crew departed for Osh. Ground observers reported that the visibility deteriorated to about 150 m (490 ft).

The aircraft was performing an ILS approach to Osh's runway 12 at about 07:56L (01:56Z) but touched down hard causing the landing gear to collapse and separate from the aircraft. The aircraft went off the runway and ran over rough terrain, the left-hand CFM International CFM56 engine separated and the right-hand engine received substantial damage before the aircraft came to a stop about 1,500 m (4,900 ft) from touchdown. Four occupants received serious injuries and ten occupants received minor injuries.

== Investigation ==
Russia's Civil Aviation Authority opened an investigation into the accident. Preliminary reports suggested the aircraft was performing an ILS approach to Osh's runway 12, with 50 m (160 ft) visibility in fog. The crew conducted a go-around following a hard touch down and joined the traffic pattern, but during the traffic pattern the crew decided to divert to their alternate and return to Bishkek, but soon after they received warnings of two hydraulic system failures, as well as failure of the No.2 engine, which was caused by the collapsed right landing gear. The crew shut the No.2 engine down and decided to perform an emergency landing at Osh, despite weather being below safe minima. The aircraft touched down very hard and skidded off the runway.

== See also ==
- Garuda Indonesia Flight 200
