= Iran Aseman Airlines Flight 6895 =

2008 aviation accident in Kyrgyzstan

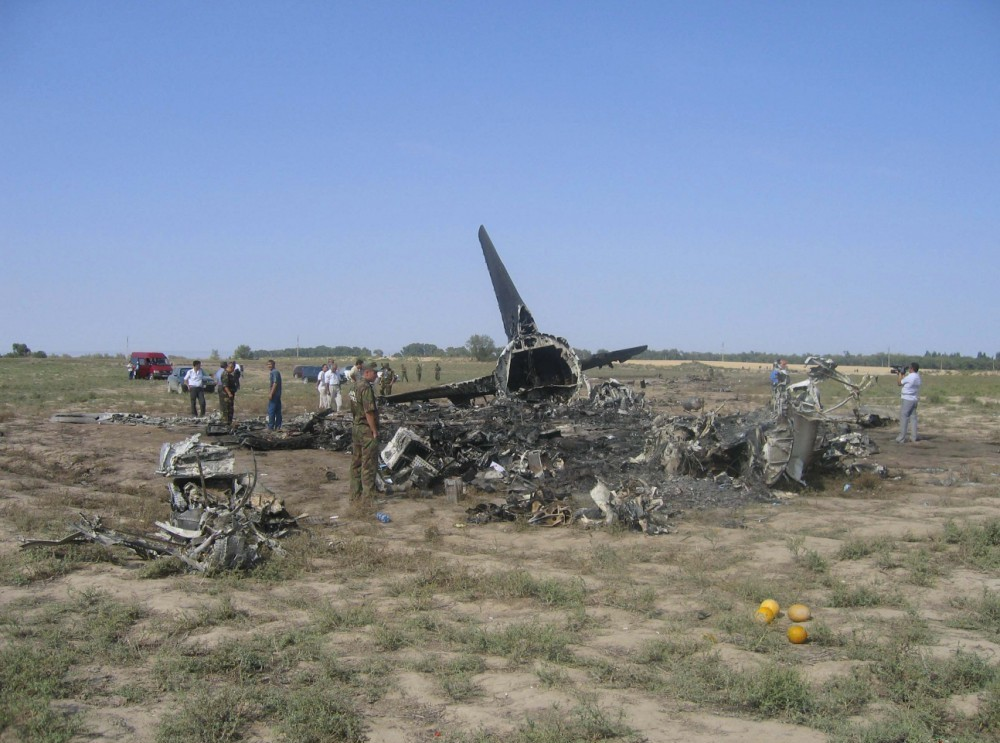
- Wreckage of the aircraft

Accident
- Date: 24 August 2008
- Summary: Controlled flight into terrain during approach due to pilot error
- Site: Manas International Airport, Bishkek, Kyrgyzstan; 43°4′42.2″N 74°21′47.5″E

Aircraft
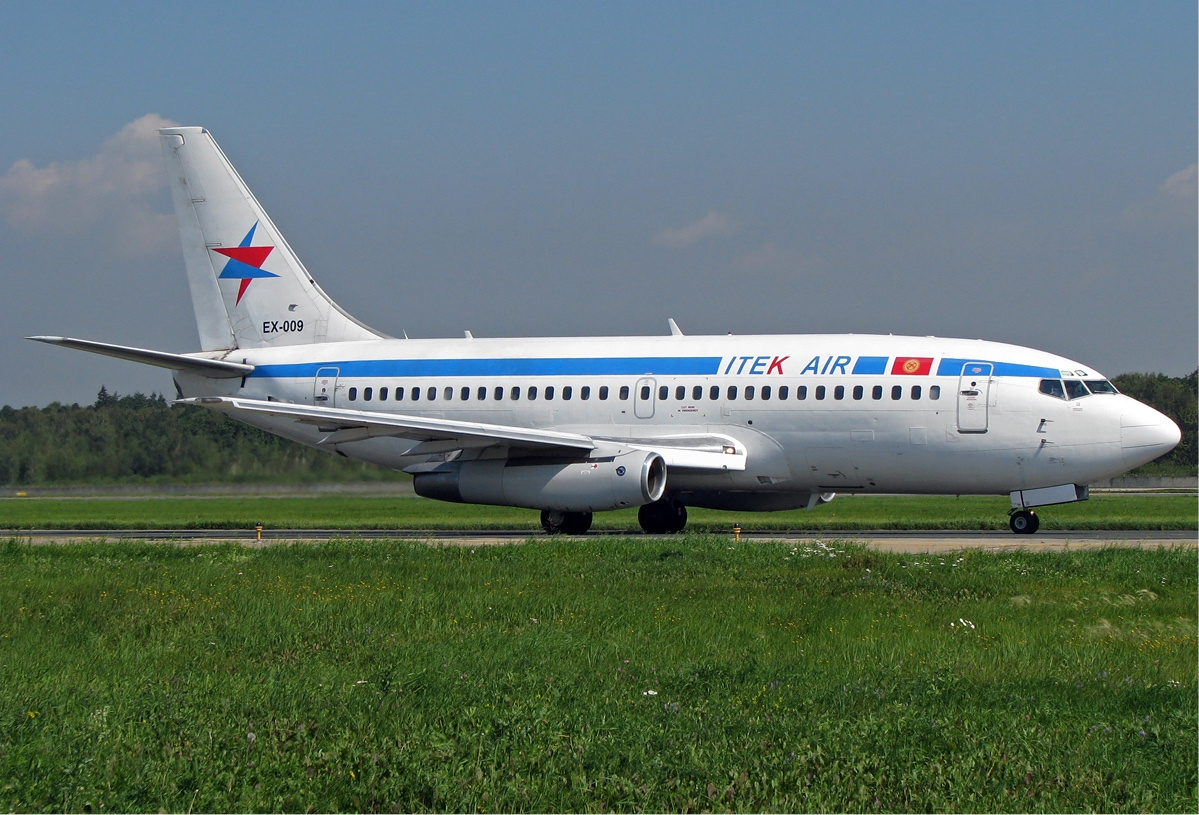
- EX-009, the aircraft involved, photographed four days before the accident
- Aircraft type: Boeing 737-219 Advanced
- Operator: Itek Air on behalf of Iran Aseman Airlines
- IATA flight No.: EP6895
- ICAO flight No.: IRC6895
- Call sign: ASEMAN 6895
- Registration: EX-009
- Flight origin: Manas International Airport, Bishkek, Kyrgyzstan
- Destination: Tehran Imam Khomeini International Airport, Tehran, Iran
- Occupants: 90
- Passengers: 85
- Crew: 5
- Fatalities: 65
- Injuries: 18
- Survivors: 25

Iran Aseman Airlines Flight 6895, was a Boeing 737-200, registered as EX-009, operating a charter flight operated by Itek Air on behalf of Iran Aseman Airlines which crashed on 24 August 2008 (at 20:44 local time) near Manas International Airport in Kyrgyzstan while en route to Imam Khomeini International Airport, Tehran, Iran. It crashed while returning to the airport of origin after experiencing technical difficulties.

== Accident ==
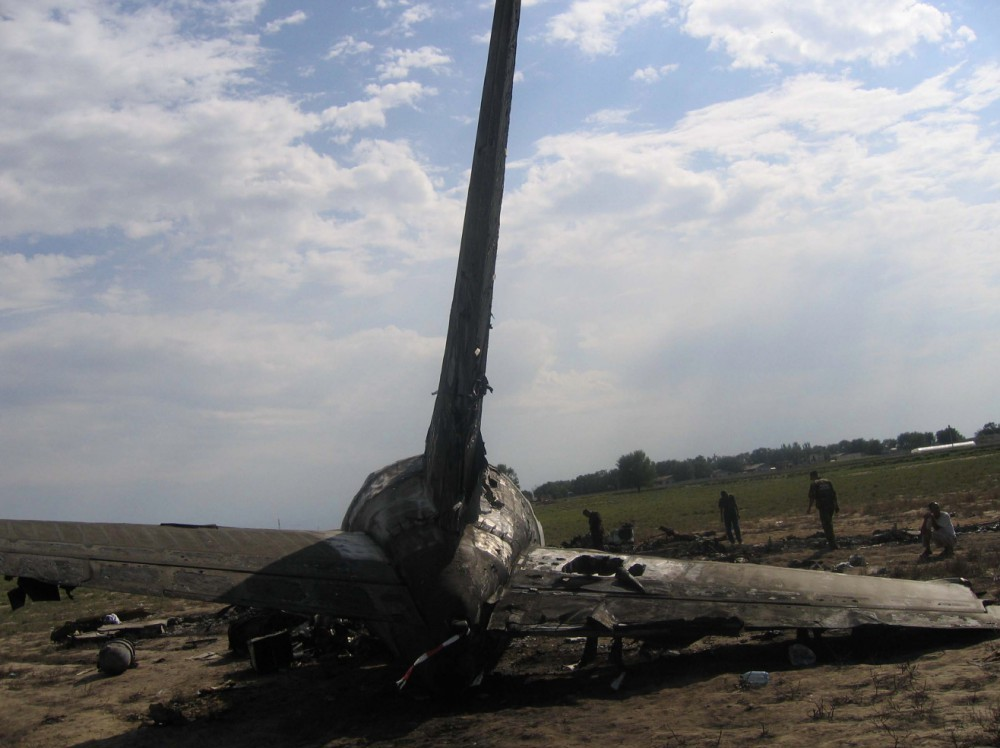
The aft section seen from the back

Seven minutes after takeoff, the crew requested a return to Manas airport due to a "technical reason", when they saw an indication that one of the doors was not properly locked and the cabin was not pressurized as expected.

The ATC asked the crew whether they are going to perform a visual approach, and the crew confirmed they are requesting a visual approach.

Realizing that the speed and altitude was too high for landing, the pilot decided to execute a left 360 degree turn when they were 6 kilometres (3.7 mi) away from the airport.

While executing this turn, the pilot failed to monitor altitude and vertical speed and inadvertently descended, being unable to see the ground at night. The aircraft struck ground with its left wing and crashed.

The United States Air Force sent ambulances and fire apparatus with firefighters and medical personnel from its base at the airport in response to a request for assistance.

There were 90 people on board (85 passengers and 5 crew) of whom 65 died. This makes it the deadliest aircraft accident to ever occur in Kyrgyzstan. A total of 25 are reported to have survived. The victims included ten members of a Bishkek high school sports team, the Kyrgyzstan National U18 Volleyball Team.

== Investigation ==
The Interstate Aviation Committee (MAK) attempted to retrieve data from the flight-data and cockpit voice-recorders, which were badly damaged in the fire which destroyed most of the aircraft. While disassembling the casing, both the mechanisms of the tape recorder and the tape media in the voice recorder were found in damaged condition, but the MAK attempted to read the data from the damaged media. The 320 mm (12.6 in) of the FDR tape was damaged by fire. This resulted in 13 seconds of missing data. The recorded audio on the CVR was of a prior flight (Flight 632). It was then determined that the CVR was not working properly on flight 6895.

The MAK has released its final report. According to the report, the forward left cabin door was not closed completely, most likely due to a jammed seal. The MAK stated that this did not contribute to the accident. It further stated that lack of pressurization did not require an urgent landing using a visual approach, and therefore pilots should have used an instrument approach.

During the visual approach, the crew realized they were too fast and too high to land, and therefore decided to make a 360 degree orbit to reduce their speed and altitude before landing. The decision to make the turn was made at 3.3 nautical miles (3.8 mi; 6.1 km) away from the airport reference point.

While executing that turn, the pilot flying descended below the minimum maneuvering altitude, failed to maintain visual contact with the runway, failed to properly monitor altitude and ignored automated warnings about terrain proximity (TAWS).

The aircraft was in a 10 degree left turn, with landing gear down, flaps 15 and speed at 160 knots (300 km/h; 180 mph) when it impacted ground.

=== Conclusions ===
The MAK concluded that, despite holding proper licenses, "the analysis of the crew’s actual actions during the approach, their explanations and enquiries suggests that the crew was not properly trained for visual approaches".

The MAK also concluded that the aircraft was "reacting as expected to control inputs" and "the airframe, aircraft systems and engines as well as the avionics [...] were operative until the impact, except the cabin not pressurizing and the [cockpit voice recorder]".

MAK concluded that the cause of the crash was the crew allowing the altitude reduction of the aircraft at night to a height below the minimum height during a visual approach for an emergency landing at the airport of departure due to depressurization caused by a failed left front door seal, which led to the collision of the aircraft with the ground, the destruction of the aircraft structure followed by fire and death.

According to the report, the combination of the following factors contributed to the accident:

- Deviations from the Boeing 737-200 standard operating procedure and pilot flying / pilot monitoring task sharing principles;
- Non-adherence to visual approach rules, as the crew did not keep visual contact with the runway and/or ground references and did not follow the prescribed procedures after they lost visual contact;
- Loss of altitude control during the missed approach (which was performed because the PIC incorrectly evaluated the aircraft position in comparison with the required descent flight path when he decided to perform visual straight-in approach);
- Non-adherence to the prescribed procedures after the TAWS warning was triggered.

=== Pilots ===
- Captain: Yury Goncharov, 18,250 hours of flying experience, 2,337 hours on B737-200
- First officer: Timofey Vodolagin, 4,531 hours of flying experience, 881 hours on B737-200

The captain and the first officer were sentenced to 5 years 2 months and 5 years respectively in a penal colony.

As of August 2011, both pilots were reported to be released.

== Aircraft information ==
The aircraft involved was first delivered on July 1, 1980, and had a total flight time of 60,014 hours, with 56,196 takeoff and landing cycles. Its certificate of airworthiness, issued by the Kyrgyz DCA, was valid until May 15, 2009.

Itek Air, along with all air carriers certified by the authorities with responsibility for regulatory oversight of Kyrgyzstan, is included in a European Union list of banned airlines for safety concerns and is therefore not permitted to fly over the territory of the EU. In May 2008, EX-009 passed a full technical inspection.
