= Itek Air =

Airline

| IATA | ICAO | Call sign |
|---|---|---|
| GI | IKA | SMART ITEK |
- Founded: 1999
- Ceased operations: 2010
- Hubs: Manas International Airport
- Fleet size: 2
- Destinations: 4
- Headquarters: Bishkek, Kyrgyzstan

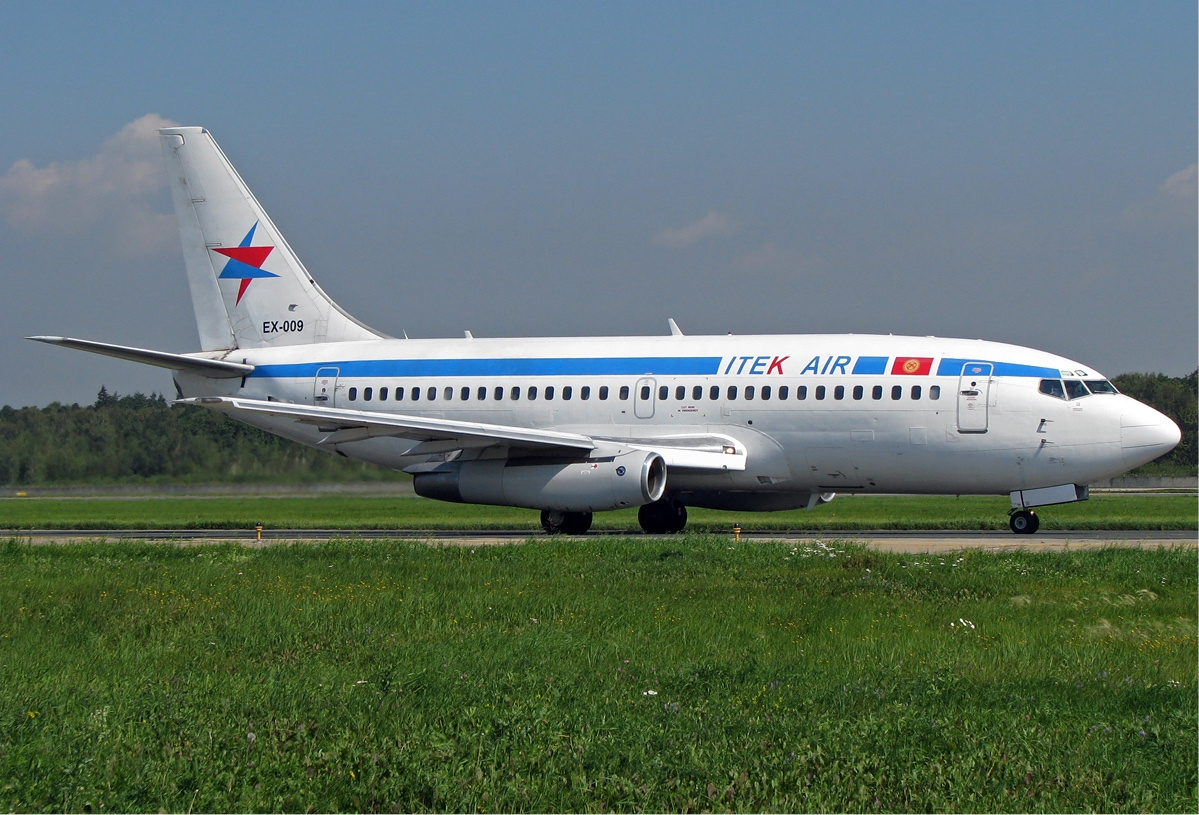
Itek Air Boeing 737-200, Moscow, 2008, which was crashed at 24 August 2008.

Itek Air, Ltd (Russian: ООО Авиакомпания «ИТЕК-ЭЙР») was an airline based in Bishkek (Manas International Airport) in Kyrgyzstan.

== Destinations ==
As of October 2008, Itek Air operated scheduled passenger flights to the following destinations:

People's Republic of China

- Ürümqi (Diwopu International Airport)

Kyrgyzstan

- Bishkek (Manas International Airport) Hub
- Osh (Osh Airport)

Russia

- Moscow (Domodedovo International Airport)
- Novosibirsk (Tolmachevo Airport)

The airline is banned from flying within the European Union.

== Accidents and incidents ==
=== Iran Aseman Airlines Flight 6895 ===
- On 24 August 2008, a Boeing 737-200, owned and operated by Itek Air (a Kyrgyz company) on a charter flight for Iran Aseman Airlines, flight 6895, crashed near Manas International Airport in Bishkek, the capital city of Kyrgyzstan, while attempting an emergency landing, returning to the airport of origin, 10 minutes after departure. Sixty-eight people were killed and 22 people survived the crash.

== Fleet ==
The fleet consisted of the following aircraft:

- 2 Boeing 737-200

The registration of the aircraft were EX-127, EX-311 and EX-009. The last one crashed near Bishkek on 24 August 2008.
