= MAXavia =

IATA	ICAO	Call sign
-	-	-
- Founded: 2006
- Ceased operations: 2009
- Hubs: Manas International Airport
- Fleet size: 1
- Headquarters: Bishkek, Kyrgyzstan
- Website: http://www.max-avia.ru

Maxavia was a charter airline based in Bishkek, Kyrgyzstan.

The airline was on the List of air carriers banned in the European Union.
