= Quadro-Aero =

IATA	ICAO	Call sign
-	QVR	-
- Founded: 2000
- Ceased operations: 2004
- Hubs: Manas International Airport
- Fleet size: 1
- Headquarters: Bishkek, Kyrgyzstan

Quadrotour-Aero was a Kyrgyzstan based airline operating a fleet of single Ilyushin IL-62, registration EX-62100. This particular aircraft was an original IL-62 series model, not the upgraded IL-62M or IL-62MK like the most, and at the time of airline operations one of only a handful of those still operational.
