= Inter Trans Avia =

IATA	ICAO	Call sign
Y5	ITD	Seitek
- Hubs: Manas International Airport
- Headquarters: Bishkek, Kyrgyzstan

Inter Trans Avia was an airline based in Kyrgyzstan. In 2002 its fleet included an Antonov An-12B and an Antonov An-12BP aircraft.
