= Osh Airport =

Airport in Osh, Kyrgyzstan

Osh International Airport Ош Эл Аралык Аэропорту

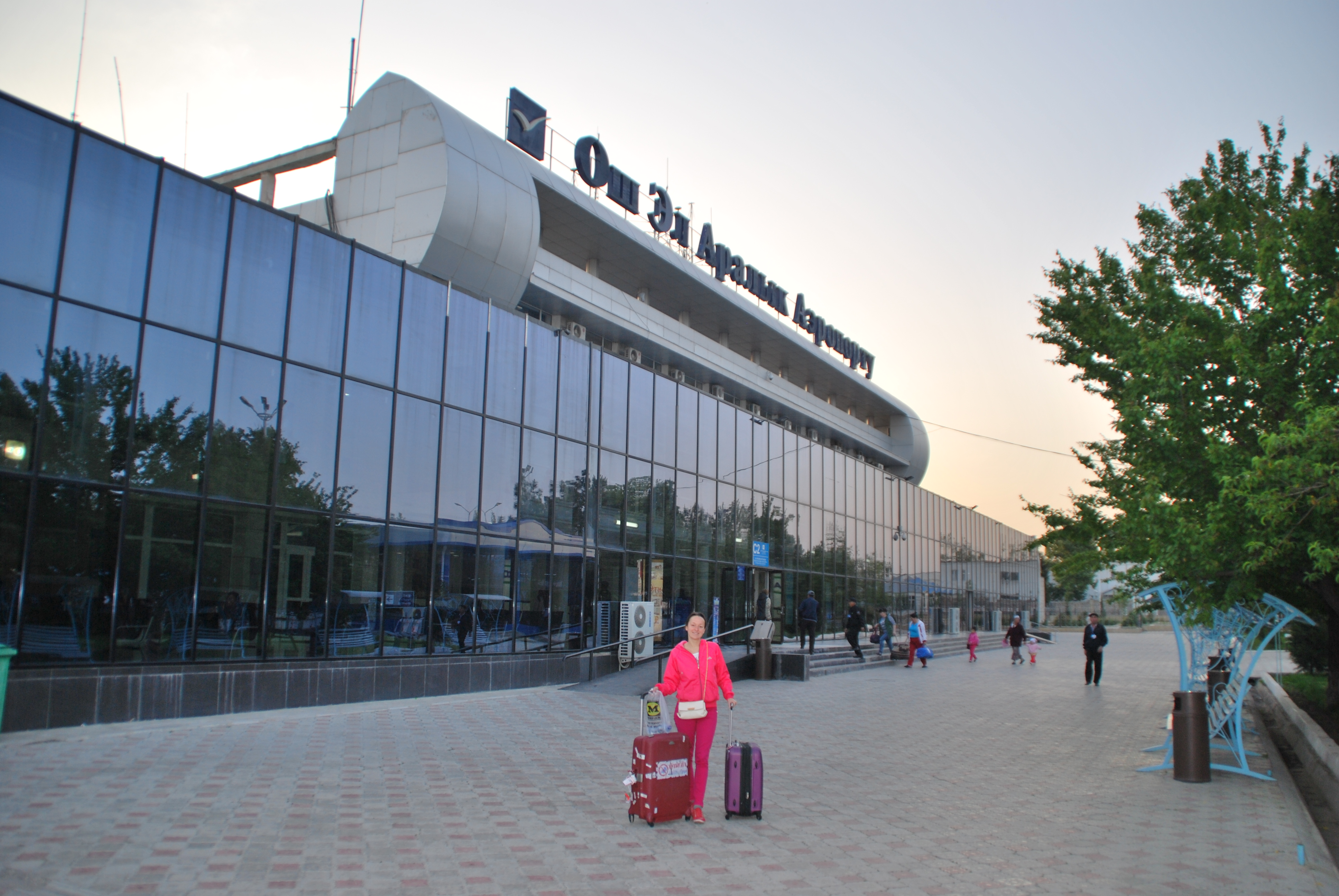
- IATA: OSS; ICAO: UCFO

Summary
- Airport type: Public
- Owner: Government
- Operator: JSC Airports of Kyrgyzstan
- Serves: Osh
- Location: Osh, Kyrgyzstan
- Hub for: Avia Traffic Company; Aero Nomad Airlines
- Focus city for: Ural Airlines
- Elevation AMSL: 2,927 ft (892 m)
- Coordinates: 40°36′32″N 072°47′35″E
- Website: oss.port.kg

Map
- Location within Kyrgyzstan

Runways
Direction	Length		Surface
Direction	m	ft	Surface
12/30	2,812	9,226	Asphalt

Statistics (2016)
- Passengers: 1,210,576
- Source: DAFIF

Osh International Airport (Kyrgyz: Ош Эл Аралык Аэропорту, romanized: Osh El Aralyk Aeroportu; Russian: Международный аэропорт "Ош") (IATA: OSS, ICAO: UCFO) is an airport serving Osh, the capital of Osh Region (oblast) of Kyrgyzstan. In 2016, 1,210,576 passengers passed through the airport, an increase of 33% over the previous years. Osh International Airport is the second busiest airport in Kyrgyzstan in terms of passenger traffic.

Osh Airport is one of the largest airports in the Fergana Valley and a subsidiary of Manas International Airport OJSC. It is located 9 km north of Osh, the most important city in southern Kyrgyzstan.

The primary function of Osh International Airport is to meet the air transportation needs of Kyrgyzstan's southern region, with Osh as its center. Distances to major cities include 300 km to Bishkek, 322 km to Tashkent, 103 km to Namangan, and 43 km to Andijan. The airport is situated at an elevation of 892 meters above sea level. The aerodrome is classified as Class B (MAK) and 4D (ICAO).

== History ==
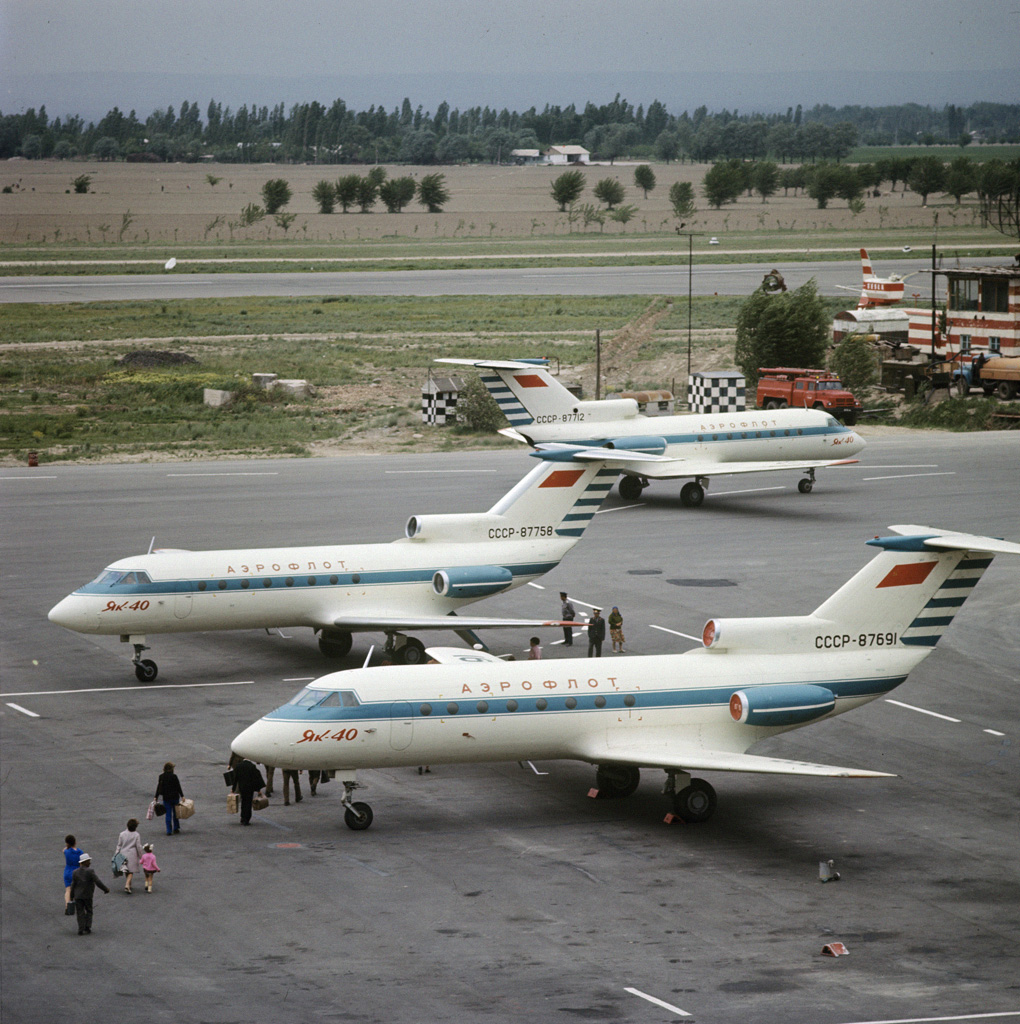
Aeroflot Yakovlev Yak-40 aircraft at Osh Airport

Osh Airport was built in 1974. The airport began operations in 1974, and its international sector was opened in 1992.

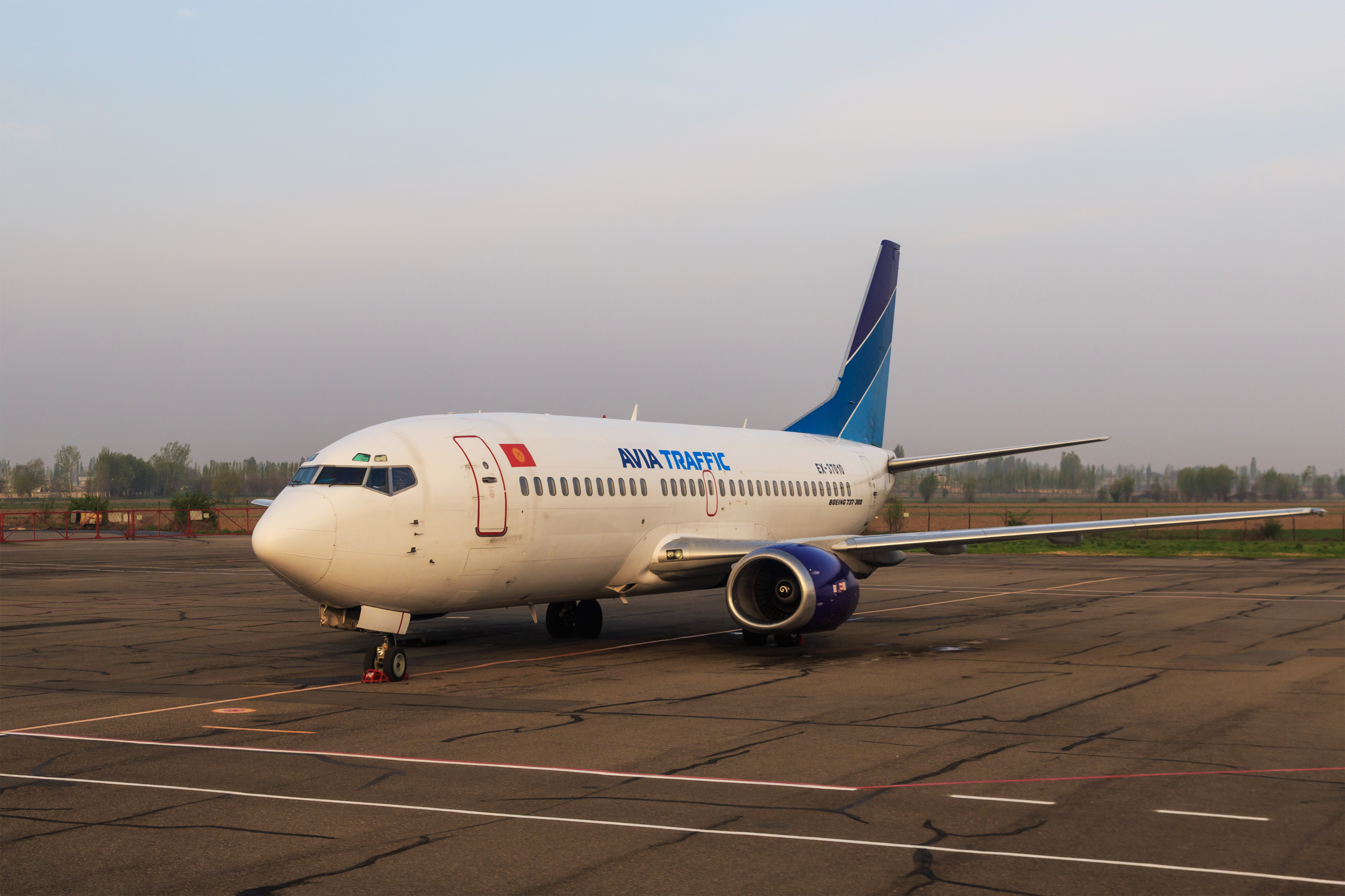
Boeing 737-300 of Avia Traffic Company at Osh Airport

=== New terminal ===
Construction of a new terminal at Osh International Airport began on February 14, 2025. The terminal will increase passenger capacity to 900 per hour. The project was developed by the Ministry of Construction, with Kyrgyzkurulush as the contractor. Funding is provided by JSC Airports of Kyrgyzstan.

A new two-story terminal with a basement will be built at Osh Airport, designed to accommodate over 5 million passengers annually. The terminal will cover 25,443 square meters and include a spacious waiting area, modern check-in zones, a food court, rest areas, and an automated parking facility for 650 vehicles.

The airport will also undergo major upgrades:

- Apron expansion – the number of aircraft parking spots will increase by 25.
- Runway extension – design documentation will be completed in 2025, with construction planned for 2026. The runway reconstruction at Osh Airport is set to be completed by 2027.
- Lighting system upgrade – after reconstruction, high-intensity lighting will meet Category 3 standards, allowing aircraft to land in almost any weather conditions.

== Facilities ==
Osh Airport operates 24/7. It features three taxiways and a ramp with 14 parking stands. Aircraft parking is facilitated by an escort vehicle when necessary. The ramp spans a total area of 59,200 square meters. The runway is 3,212 meters long and 45 meters wide.

The main operator is Avia Traffic Company.

In 2019, a runway reconstruction was completed, resulting in a total runway length of 3,212 meters. The Pavement Classification Number (PCN) of the runway is 30/F/B/X/T.

The airport accommodates a wide range of aircraft, including: An-12, An-24, An-26, An-28, An-30, An-32, An-72, An-74, Il-76, L-410, Tu-134, Tu-154, Yak-40, Yak-42, Airbus A319, Airbus A320, Boeing 737 (all modifications), Boeing 767, and other aircraft in categories 3-4, as well as helicopters of all types.

== Airlines and destinations ==
Airlines	Destinations
Aeroflot	Moscow–Sheremetyevo
Aero Nomad Airlines	Bishkek, Moscow–Vnukovo, Surgut; Seasonal: Novosibirsk
Air Arabia	Sharjah
Air Astana	Almaty
Asman Airlines	Bishkek, Issyk-Kul, Karakol
Avia Traffic Company	Bishkek, Irkutsk, Krasnoyarsk–International, Moscow–Domodedovo, Novosibirsk, Saint Petersburg, Yekaterinburg
Centrum Air	Tashkent
Chengdu Airlines	Kashgar
China Southern Airlines	Ürümqi
Flynas	Jeddah
Jazeera Airways	Kuwait City
Nordwind Airlines	Tyumen
Pegasus Airlines	Istanbul–Sabiha Gökçen
Pobeda	Moscow–Vnukovo
Red Wings Airlines	Makhachkala
Rossiya Airlines	Krasnoyarsk
S7 Airlines	Irkutsk, Novosibirsk
SalamAir	Muscat
Sky FRU	Bishkek, Issyk-Kul
Ural Airlines	Chelyabinsk, Irkutsk, Kazan, Krasnoyarsk–International, Mineralnye Vody, Moscow–Domodedovo, Moscow–Zhukovsky, Nizhnevartovsk, Saint Petersburg, Sochi, Yekaterinburg

Osh Airport
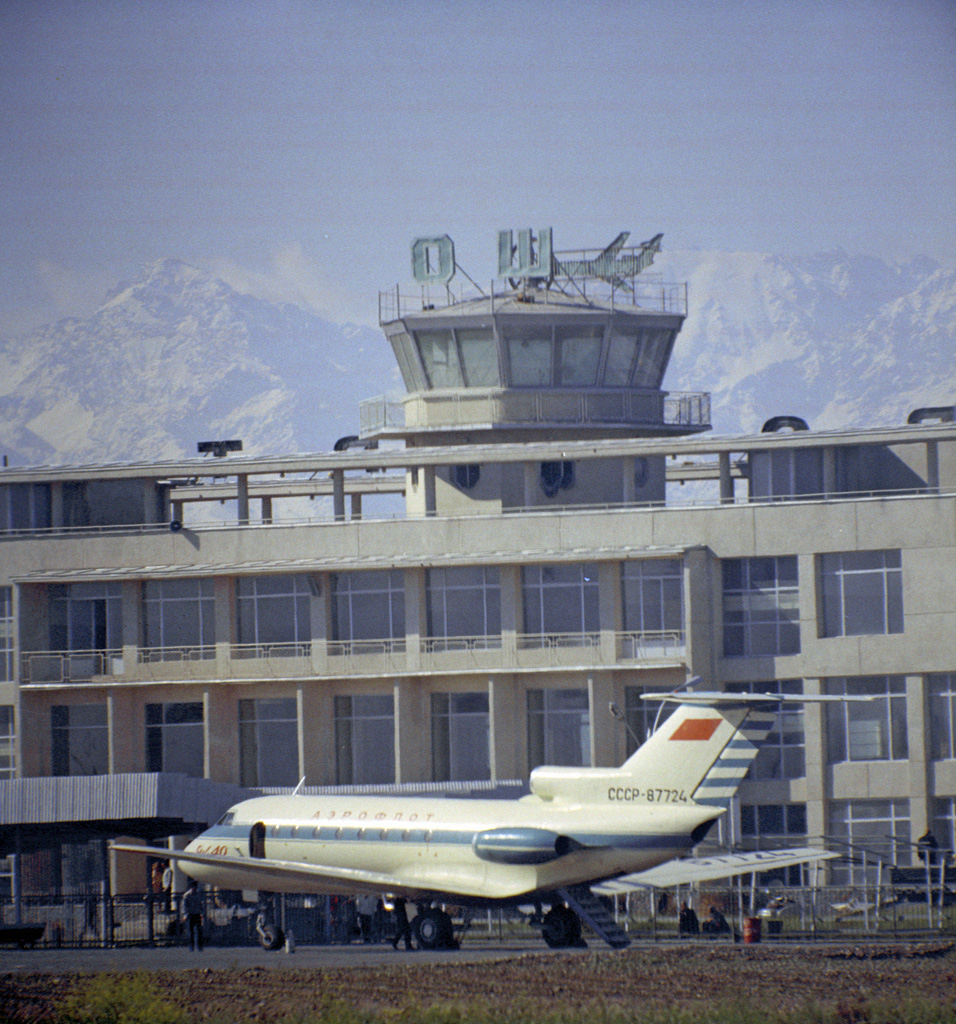
The airport in 1974.

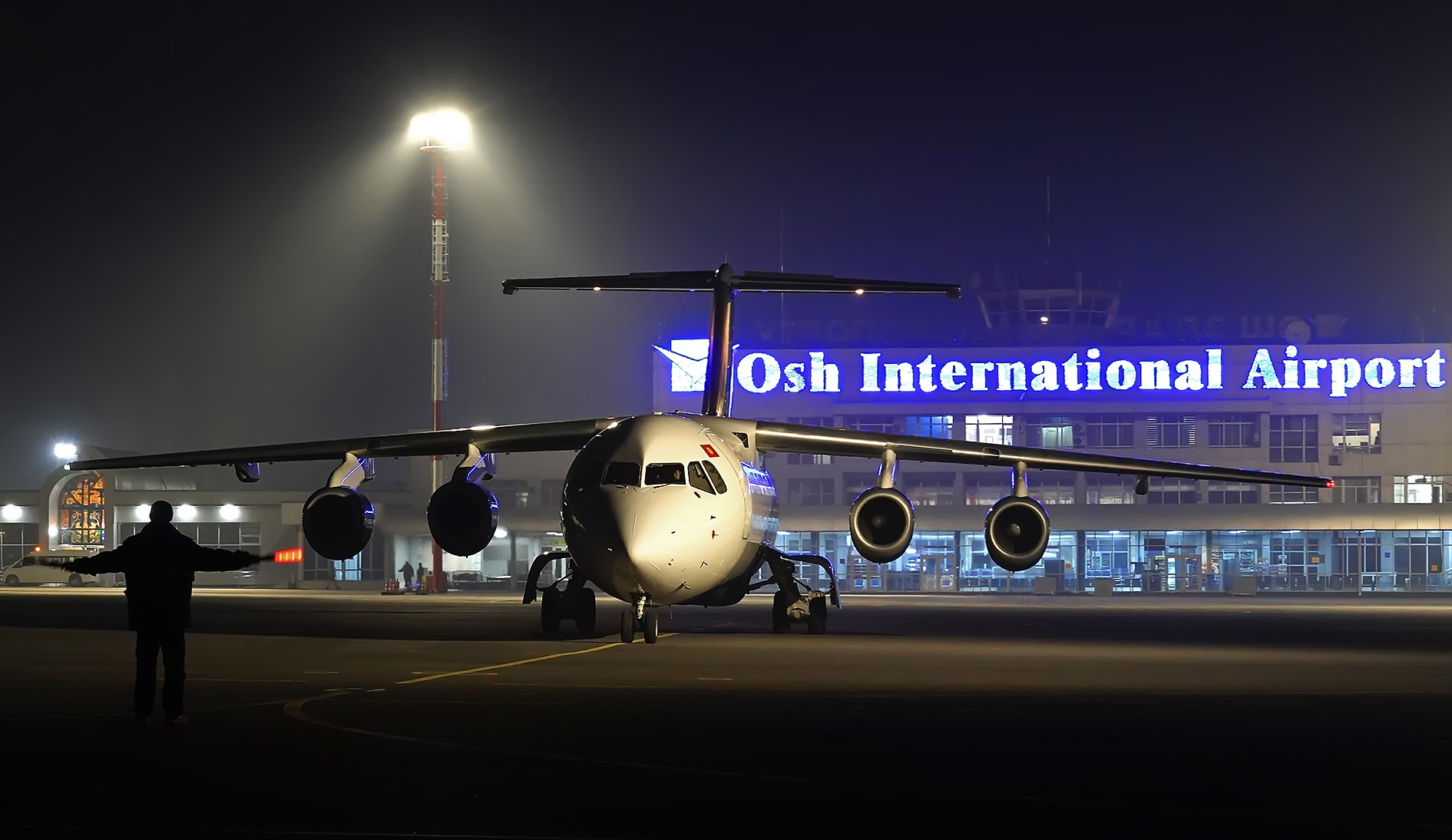
Airport terminal at night with TezJet aircraft taxiing to stand.

== Accidents and incidents ==
- On 28 December 2011, Kyrgyzstan Tupolev TU-134A, registration EX-020, operating flight QH3 from Bishkek to Osh, Kyrgyzstan, with 73 passengers and 6 crew suffered a hard landing on Osh's runway 12, resulting in the collapse of the right main gear, right wing separation and the aircraft rolling on its back in fog and low visibility. The aircraft came to a stop on soft ground about 10 meters off the right runway edge. A fuel leak from the left wing led to a fire erupting which was quickly extinguished by airport emergency services. One passenger was seriously injured and 24 received minor injuries (concussions, bruises), of which 16 were taken to local hospitals.
- On 22 November 2015, a Boeing 737-300 registration EX-37005, operating as Avia Traffic Company Flight 768, touched down hard at Osh Airport, injuring 8, and causing the landing gear to be ripped off. The aircraft skidded off the runway and the left engine was ripped off.

== Ground transportation ==
Marshrutka routes No. 107 and 142 serve the airport.

== See also ==
- List of the busiest airports in the former USSR
- Transportation in Kyrgyzstan
