= Avia Traffic Company =

Airline of Kyrgyzstan

Avia Traffic Company, LLC ООО «Авиа Трафик Компани»

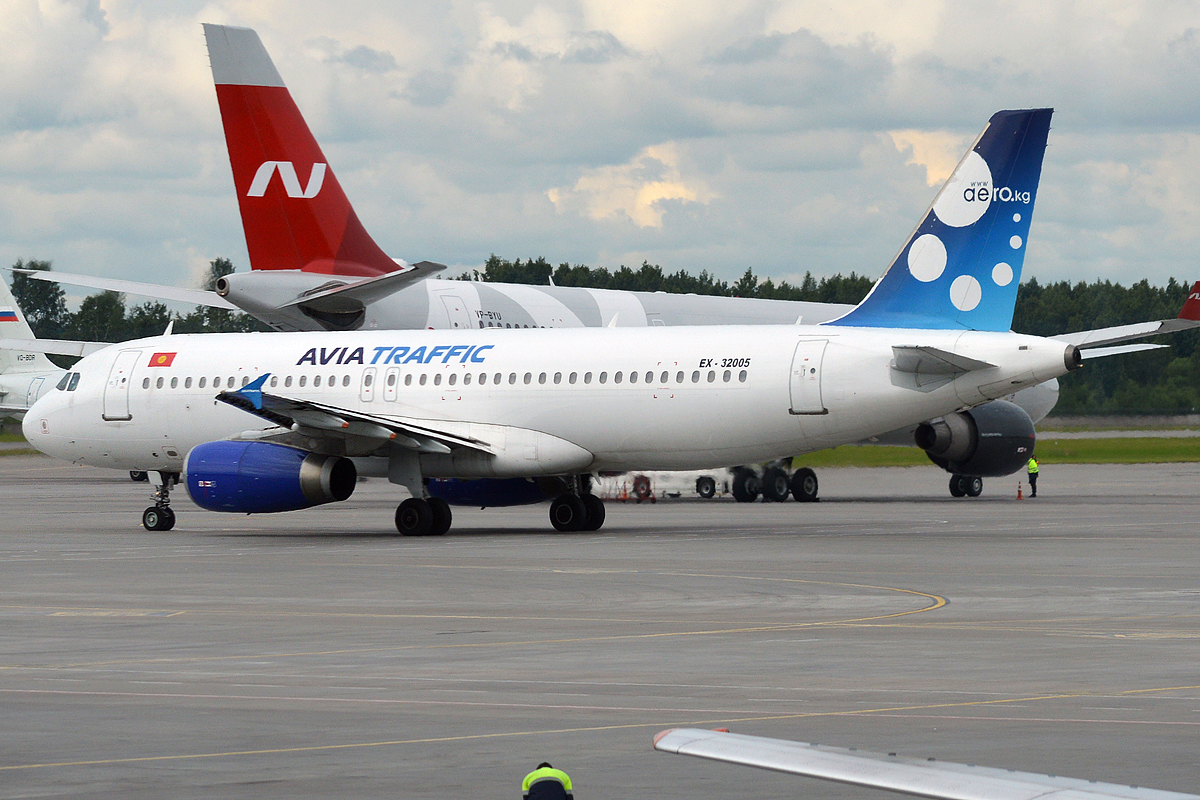
IATA	ICAO	Call sign
YK	AVJ	ATOMIC
- Founded: 2003; 23 years ago
- Hubs: Manas International Airport
- Fleet size: 6
- Destinations: 11
- Headquarters: Bishkek, Kyrgyzstan
- Key people: Karim Fiatovich Damin (General Director)
- Website: http://www.aero.kg/

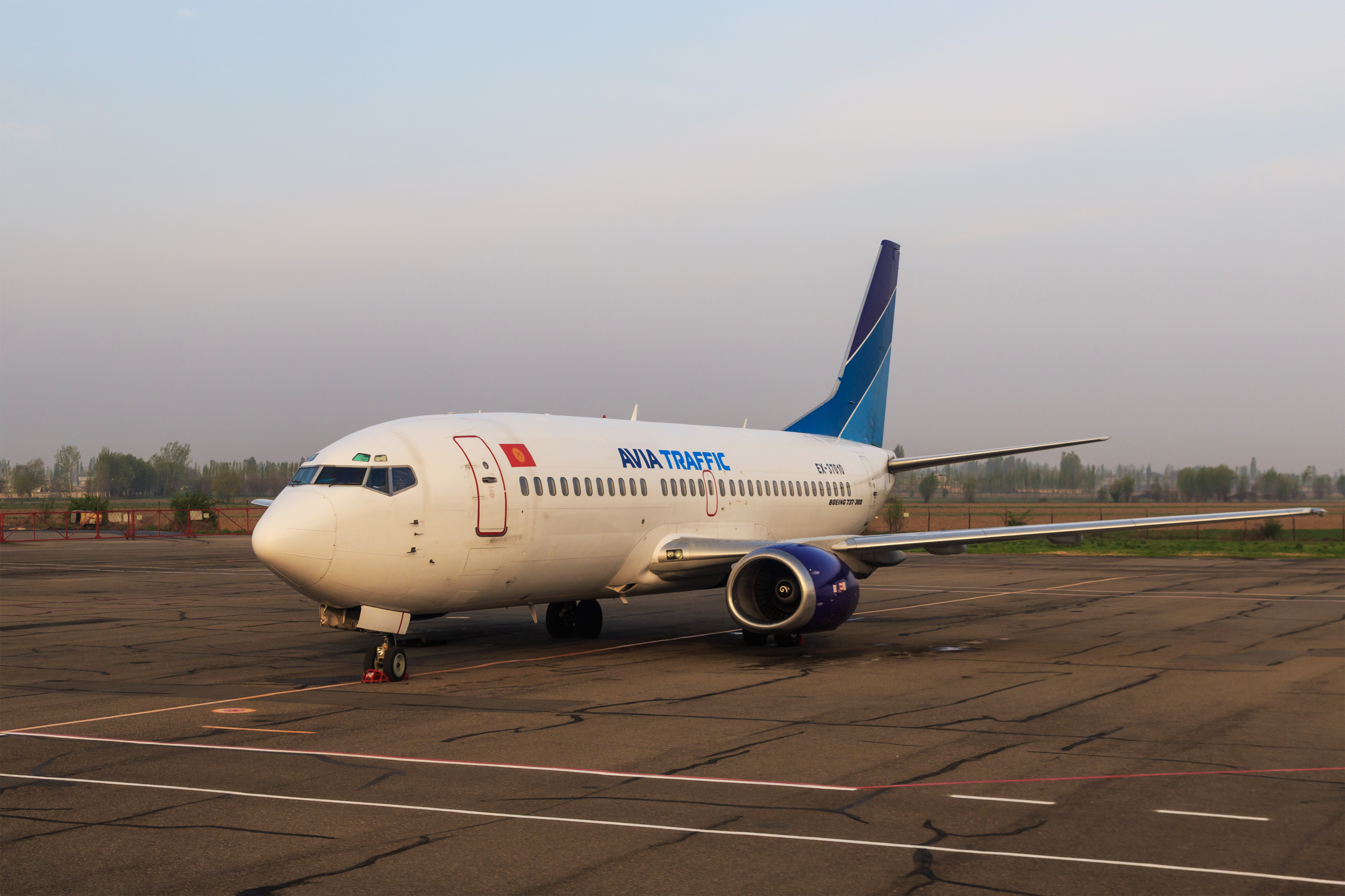
Avia Traffic's Boeing 737-300 at Osh Airport

Avia Traffic Company is an airline with its head office in Bishkek, Kyrgyzstan. operating out of Manas International Airport.

The Avia Air Traffic Company, along with all other airlines based in Kyrgyzstan, was on the list of air carriers banned in the European Union. The ban was lifted in June 2026.

== Destinations ==
As of December 2023, Avia Traffic Company operates scheduled passenger flights to the following destinations:

Kyrgyzstan

- Bishkek (Manas International Airport) Base
- Osh (Osh Airport)

Russia

- Irkutsk (International Airport Irkutsk)
- Kazan (Ğabdulla Tuqay Kazan International Airport)
- Krasnodar (Pashkovsky Airport)
- Krasnoyarsk (Yemelyanovo Airport)
- Moscow
  - Moscow Domodedovo Airport
  - Zhukovsky International Airport
- Novosibirsk (Tolmachevo Airport)
- Surgut (Surgut Airport)
- St Petersburg (Pulkovo Airport)
- Yekaterinburg (Koltsovo International Airport)

Turkey

- Istanbul (Istanbul Airport)

=== Interline agreements ===
- Hahn Air

== Fleet ==
=== Current fleet ===
As of August 2025, Avia Traffic Company operates the following aircraft:

Avia Traffic Company fleet
Aircraft	In service	Order	Passengers	Notes
Airbus A320	2	—	180	
Boeing 737-300	4	—	149	
Total	6	—		

=== Former fleet ===
As of August 2025, Avia Traffic Company operated 3 Airbus A320 and 4 Boeing 737-300.

The airline also previously operated the following aircraft:

- 2 British Aerospace 146-200
- 1 further Boeing 737-300
- 1 Boeing 737-500

3 Airbus A320 and

== Accidents ==
- On 22 November 2015, a Boeing 737-300 registration EX-37005, operating as Avia Traffic Company Flight 768, touched down hard at Osh Airport injuring 8, and causing all the landing gear to be ripped off. The aircraft skidded off the runway and the left engine was ripped off.
