= Aeroflot Flight 29674 =

1988 aviation accident in the Soviet Union

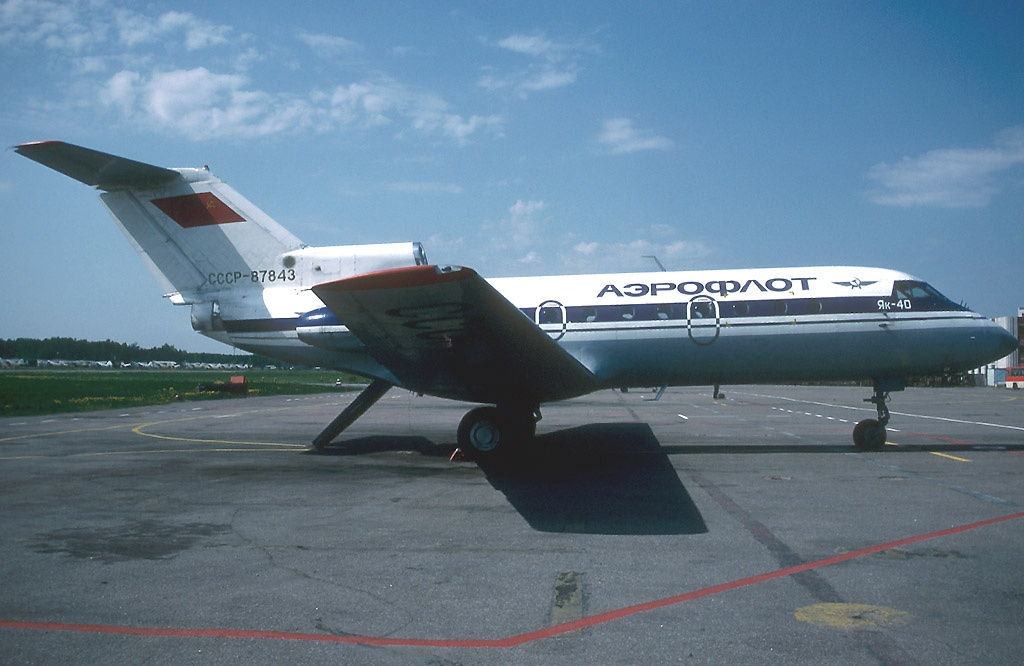
- An Aeroflot Yakovlev Yak-40, similar to the accident aircraft

Accident
- Date: 24 January 1988
- Summary: Unexplained engine failure on takeoff, loss of control
- Site: near Nizhnevartovsk Airport, Nizhenvartovsk, RSFSR, USSR; 60°58′30″N 76°31′34″E

Aircraft
- Aircraft type: Yakovlev Yak-40
- Operator: Bugulminsky OJSC, a unit of Aeroflot
- Registration: CCCP-87549
- Flight origin: Nizhnevartovsk Airport, Nizhnevartovsk
- Stopover: Tyumen Airport, Tyumen
- Destination: Bugulma Airport, Bugulma
- Occupants: 31
- Passengers: 27
- Crew: 4
- Fatalities: 27
- Survivors: 4

Aeroflot Flight 29674 was a domestic passenger flight in RSFSR, Soviet Union, en routing Nizhenvartovsk - Tyumen - Bugulma. On 24 January 1988, the Yakovlev Yak-40 hit a powerline, and crashed into a ravine slope just shortly after take-off, killing 27 of the 31 on board.

== Background ==
=== Aircraft ===
The aircraft involved was a Yakovlev Yak-40 manufactured in 1975 and registered CCCP-87549. Before the accident, it had accumulated 13,978 flight hours and operated 14,766 flights.

=== Crew members ===
- Captain: Nail Nazipovich Muradymov
- Co-pilot: Sergey Viktorovich Uvarov
- Flight engineer: Nail Zinniyatovich Nugumanov
- Flight attendant: Zemfira Anisimovna Mubarakshina

== Accident ==
The plane began taking off from Nizhnevartovsk Airport at 18:50. As the plane accelerated to 150 km/h (81 knots), the flight engineer noticed the "air starter open" indicator light had illuminated. When the plane started lifting off at 215-225 km/h (116 - 122 knots), all 3 engines begin slowing down. Engine 1 and 3 only producing 6-8% while engine 2 producing 74% of its thrust. It then produced more up to 92-95%, but plane had already been slowing down and losing altitude.

At an altitude of 6 meters (19 feet), the plane clipped some treetops. After flying for 87 more meters, it crashed into the ground near the edge of a ravine. As the plane skidding for 20 more minutes, the plane entered the ravine slope at a bank angle of more than 60 degrees, then struck a power line support, completely destroying the plane. The flight lasted 92 seconds.

=== Rescue ===
Five hours later, at 21:50, the wreckage was found. Searchers were unable to correlate the time of the accident and the electrical cut. The air search was inconclusive due to the inability of using emergency radars, the lack of night vision equipment and search lights of the aircraft. The ground search was complicated by the rugged terrain and the lack of special equipment. Initially, five passenger survived, but one had died a day after the accident in the hospital. The survivors suffered from frostbite on their hands and feet, as the temperature outside was -31°C, and severe injuries from the crash.

== Investigation ==
The investigation concluded that the plane crash was due to the loss of power in all 3 engines during take-off leading to loss of control. However, the cause of the power loss in the engines has not been determined, there are two theories for this loss:

1. When the flight engineer noticed the "air starter open" indicator light had illuminated, he pulled the throttle back to idle, shutting down the other engines. After noticed the problem, the crew re-activated the take-off mode, but it was too late.
2. Air pockets had formed in the fuel system due to air ingress, causing the airlock that disrupted the fuel flow.
