= Ak Bars Aero =

Russian airline

Ak Bars Aero Ак Барс Аэро
IATA	ICAO	Call sign
2B	BGM	BUGAVIA
- Founded: 10 July 1953 (as Bugulminskoe Aviapredpriyatie)
- Commenced operations: 2010
- Ceased operations: 12 January 2015
- Hubs: Bugulma Airport
- Secondary hubs: Kazan International Airport
- Parent company: Ak Bars Holdings
- Headquarters: Bugulma Airport; Bugulma, Russia

Notes
- recreated as UVT Aero

OJSC Ak Bars Aero (Russian: ОАО «Ак Барс Аэро»), formerly OJSC Bugulma Air Enterprise (Russian: ОАО «Бугульминское авиапредприятие»), was an airline with its head office at Bugulma Airport in Bugulma, Russia. It operated regional scheduled and charter passenger services. Its main base was Bugulma Airport.

== History ==
The airline was formed in 1993 as Bugulma Air Enterprise from the former Aeroflot division based at Bugulma. The airline was renamed Ak Bars Aero in 2010.

Due to financial difficulties, the airline filed for bankruptcy and suspended scheduled passenger services from 12 January 2015 and planned to lease its fleet of 15 CRJ-200 aircraft to other airlines.

== Destinations ==
As of February 2014, AK Bars Aero operated to the following destinations:

=== International destinations ===
Azerbaijan

- Baku – Heydar Aliyev International Airport

Ukraine

- Simferopol – Simferopol International Airport

=== Domestic destinations ===
Astrakhan Oblast

- Astrakhan – Narimanovo Airport

Bashkortostan

- Ufa – Ufa International Airport

Belgorod Oblast

- Belgorod – Belgorod International Airport

Chuvashia

- Cheboksary – Cheboksary Airport

Chelyabinsk Oblast

- Chelyabinsk – Balandino Airport
- Magnitogorsk – Magnitogorsk Airport

Krasnodar Krai

- Sochi – Adler-Sochi International Airport

Kaliningrad Oblast

- Kaliningrad – Khrabrovo Airport

Kirov Oblast

- Kirov – Pobedilovo Airport

Kursk Oblast

- Kursk – Kursk Vostochny Airport

Mari El

- Yoshkar-Ola – Yoshkar-Ola Airport

Mordovia

- Saransk – Saransk Airport

Moscow / Moscow Oblast

- Moscow – Domodedovo International Airport (secondary hub)

Nizhny Novgorod Oblast

- Nizhny Novgorod – Strigino Airport

Novosibirsk Oblast

- Novosibirsk – Tolmachevo Airport

Penza Oblast

- Penza – Penza Airport

Perm Krai

- Perm – Bolshoye Savino Airport

Rostov Oblast

- Rostov-on-Don – Rostov-on-Don Airport

Samara Oblast

- Samara – Kurumoch International Airport

Saratov Oblast

- Saratov – Saratov Tsentralny Airport

(Saint Petersburg) St Petersburg / Leningrad Oblast

- St Petersburg – Pulkovo International Airport

Stavropol Krai

- Mineralnye Vody – Mineralnye Vody Airport

Sverdlovsk Oblast

- Yekaterinburg – Koltsovo Airport

Tatarstan

- Bugulma – Bugulma Airport (hub)
- Kazan – Kazan International Airport (hub)
- Nizhnekamsk / Naberezhnye Chelny – Begishevo Airport

Tyumen Oblast

- Khanty-Mansi Autonomous Okrug
  - Nizhnevartovsk – Nizhnevartovsk Airport
  Yamalo-Nenets Autonomous Okrug
  - Novy Urengoy – Novy Urengoy Airport

Ulyanovsk Oblast

- Ulyanovsk – Ulyanovsk Baratayevka Airport

== Fleet ==
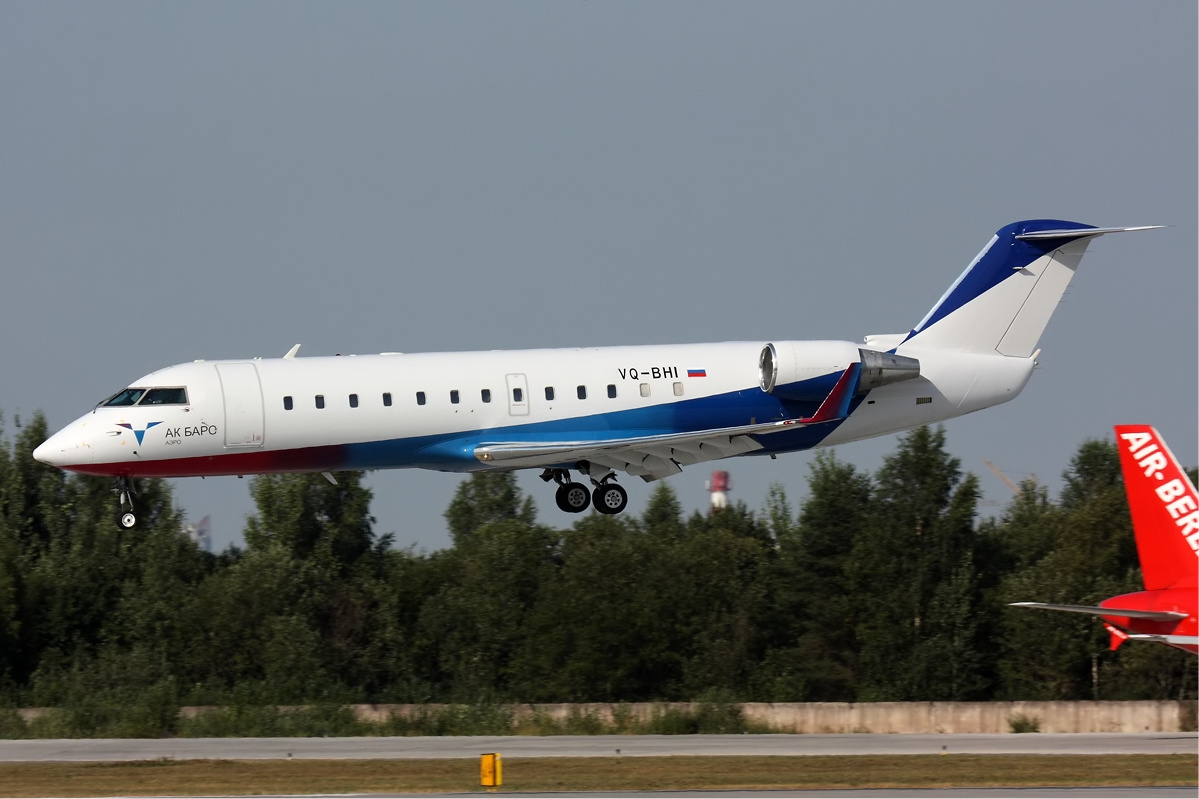
Ak Bars Aero Bombardier CRJ200

The Bugulma Air Enterprise fleet consists of the following aircraft (as of December 2012)

=== Fixed-wing aircraft fleet ===
Aircraft	In fleet	Orders	Passengers	Role	Notes
Bombardier CRJ200	16		50	Scheduled/ charter	
Bombardier Challenger 600	1	—	11	VIP charter	
Yakovlev Yak-40	10	—	11–14	VIP charter	3 more stored.

=== Helicopter fleet ===
Aircraft	In fleet	Orders	Passengers	Notes
Bell 407	unknown	1	6	
Eurocopter EC135	—	1	TBA	
Mil Mi-8	unknown	—	24	
Robinson R44	unknown	2	3	

== See also ==
- UVT Aero
