= Simferopol International Airport =

Airport in Crimea

Simferopol International Airport Міжнародний аеропорт "Сімферополь"

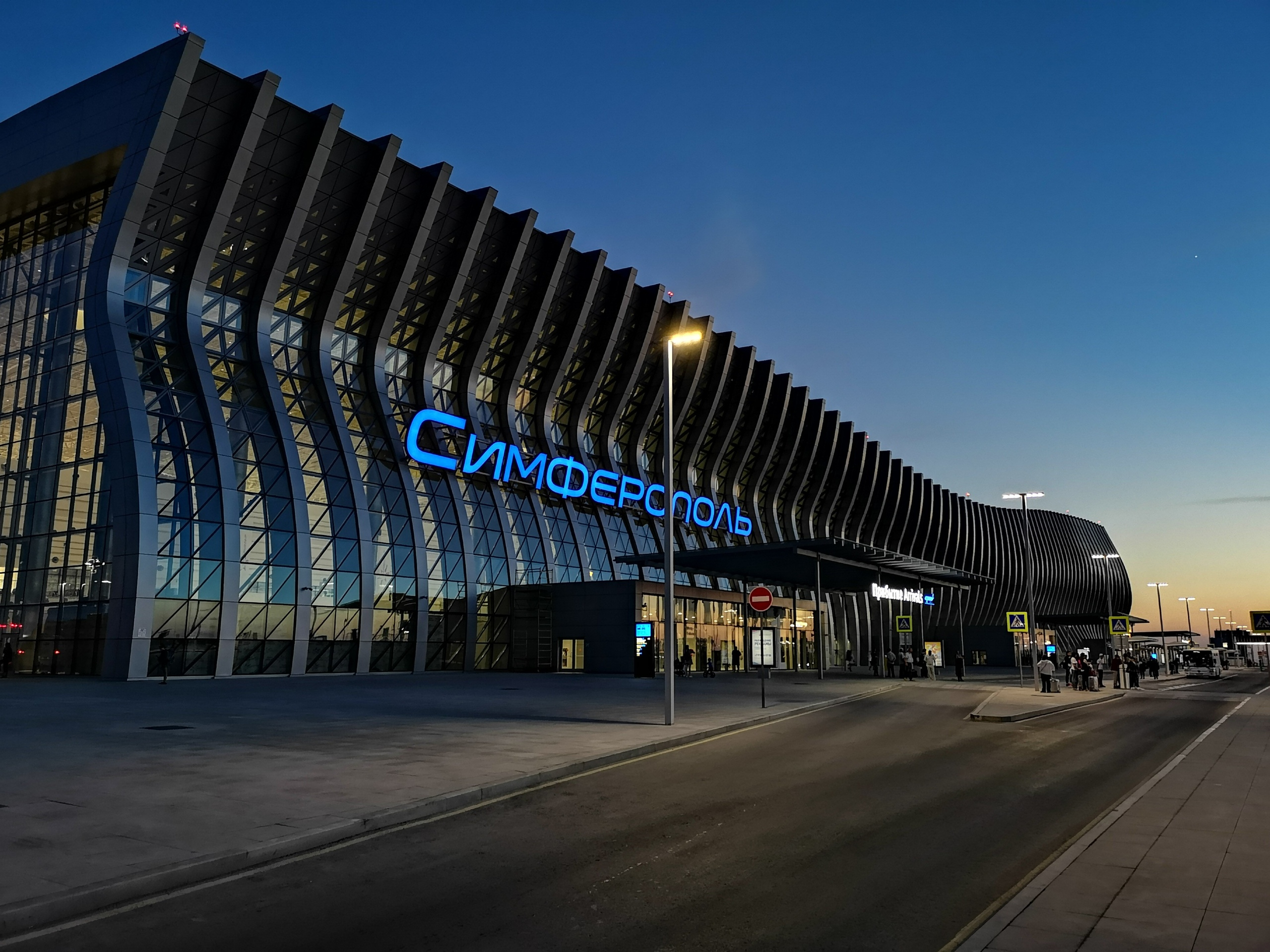
- IATA: SIP; ICAO: UKFF / URFF; LID: СИП (УРФФ)

Summary
- Airport type: Public
- Serves: Crimea
- Location: Simferopol, Crimea
- Opened: 1936
- Closed: temporarily since 2022
- Elevation AMSL: 597 ft (182 m)
- Coordinates: 45°03′07″N 33°58′25″E
- Website: new.sipaero.ru/en/

Maps
- Location of the airport in Crimea Location of the airport in Europe
- Interactive map of Simferopol International Airport

Runways
Direction	Length		Surface
Direction	m	ft	Surface
01/19	3,701	12,142	Concrete

Statistics (2021)
- Passengers: 6,830,000

Simferopol International Airport (Note: Ukrainian: Міжнародний аеропорт "Сімферополь", Mizhnarodnyy aeroport "Simferopol’"; Russian: Международный аэропорт "Симферополь", Mezhdunarodnyy aeroport "Simferopol’"; Crimean Tatar: Aqmescit Halqara Ava Limanı, Акъмесджит Халкъара Ава Лиманы) is an airport located in Simferopol, Crimea. Since the annexation of Crimea by the Russian Federation in 2014, the airport is only used for flights to and from Russian airports due to limited international recognition of the annexation. Since 24 February 2022, all flights are suspended due to situations in the aftermath the Russian invasion of Ukraine.

On 14 May 2015, the Verkhovna Rada of Ukraine voted to rename it Amet-khan Sultan International Airport in memory of Amet-khan Sultan, despite that Russia occupied Crimea and controlled the airport since 2014. Another airport named after Amet-khan Sultan is Uytash Airport located in Makhachkala, Dagestan, Russia. However, in 2018, citizens voted for the airport to be named after the painter Ivan Aivazovsky after Amet-khan's name was not allowed in the list of final three options to vote for despite being the most popular in the preliminary round of voting.

== History ==
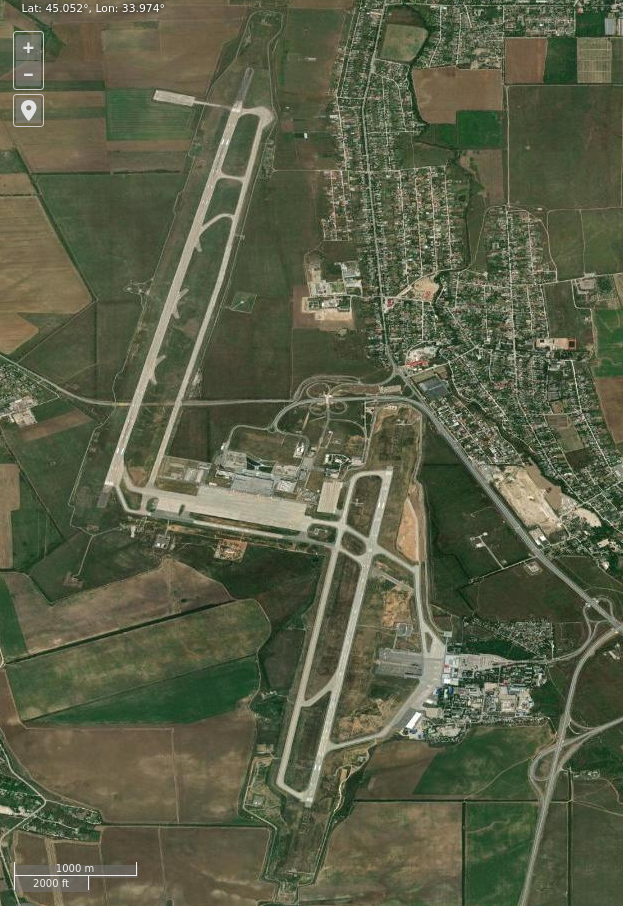
Satellite imagery of Simferopol Airport

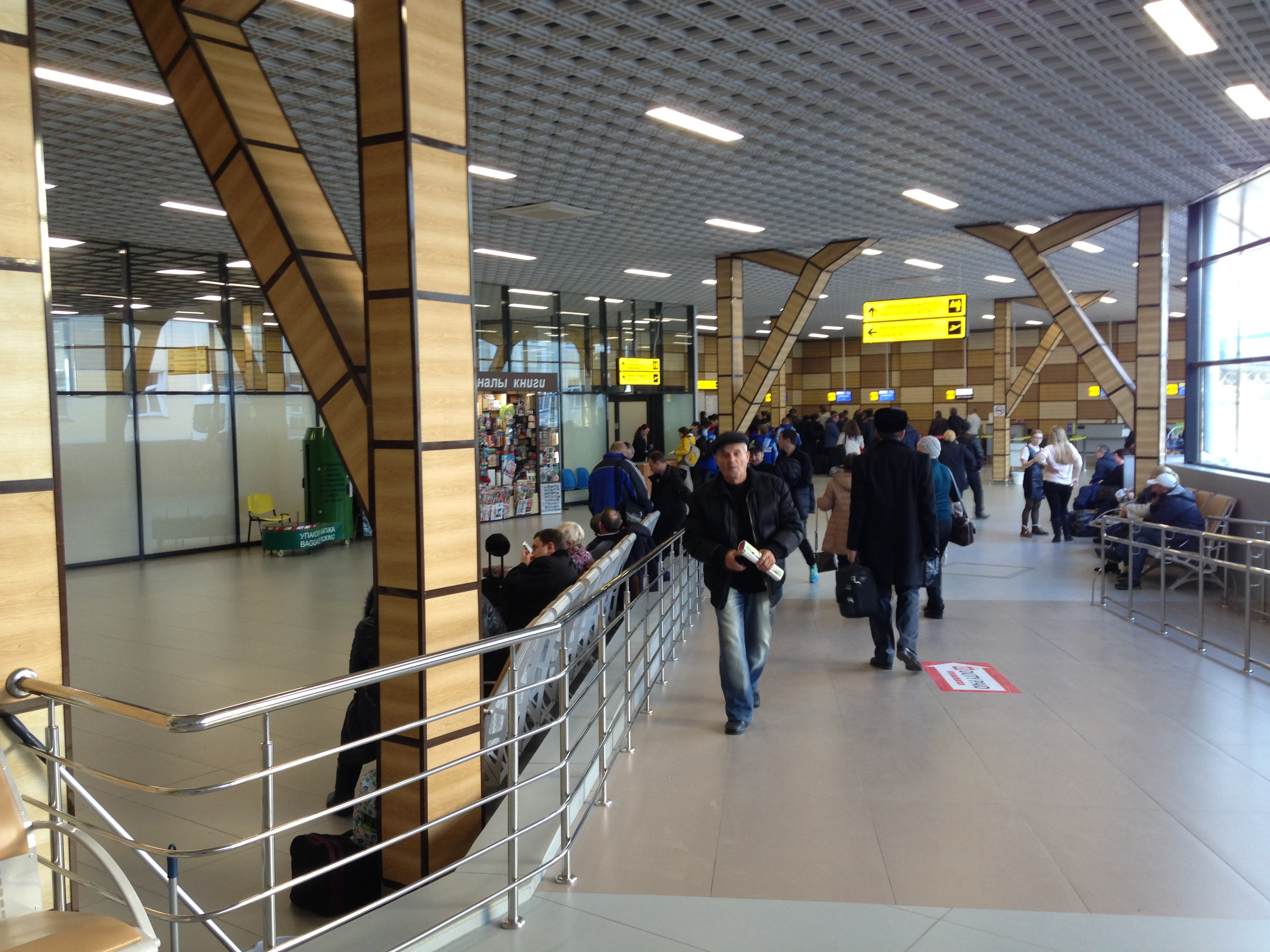
Simferopol International Airport inactive terminal B inside after reconstruction

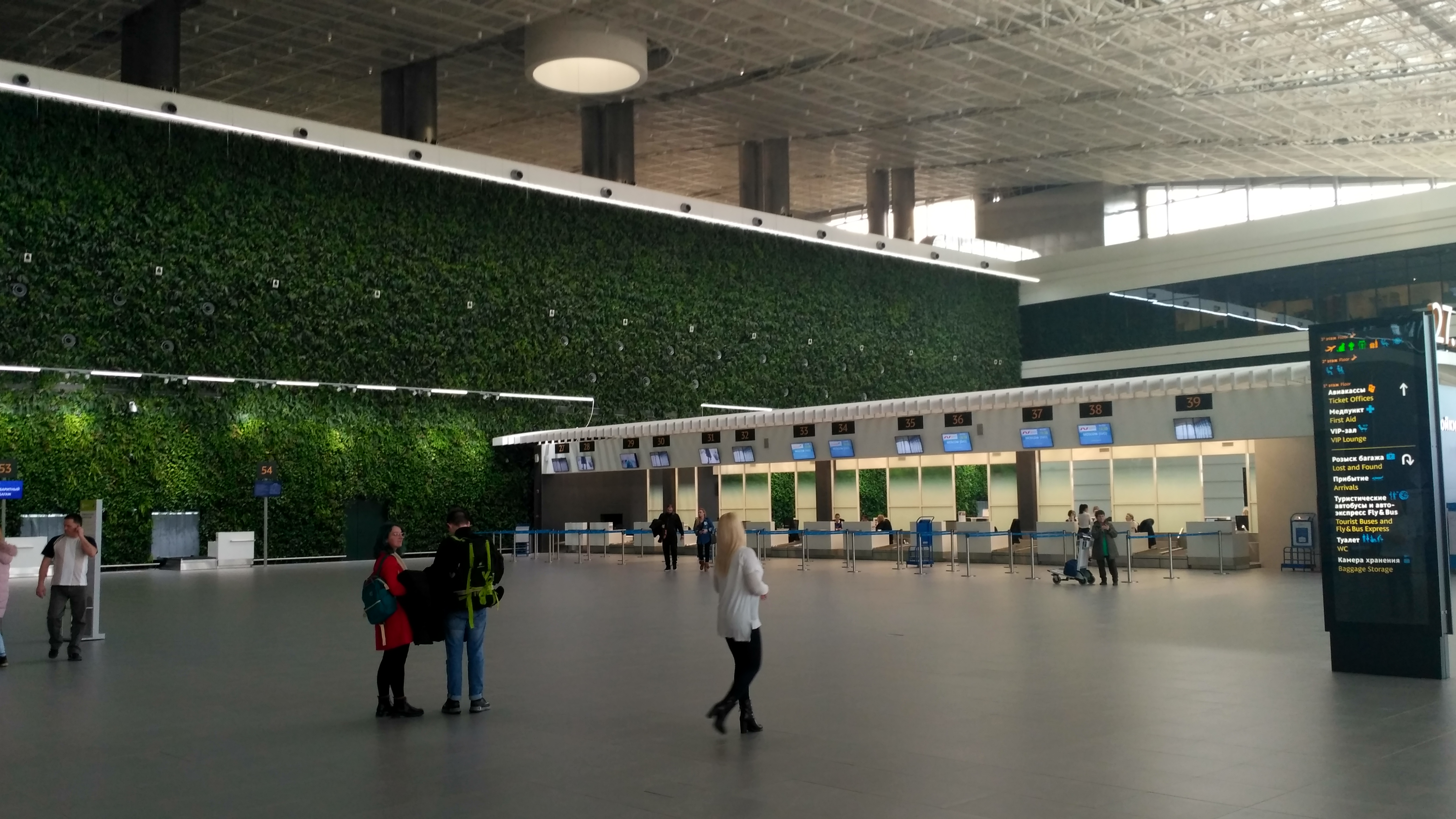
Check-in desks and wall with natural plants

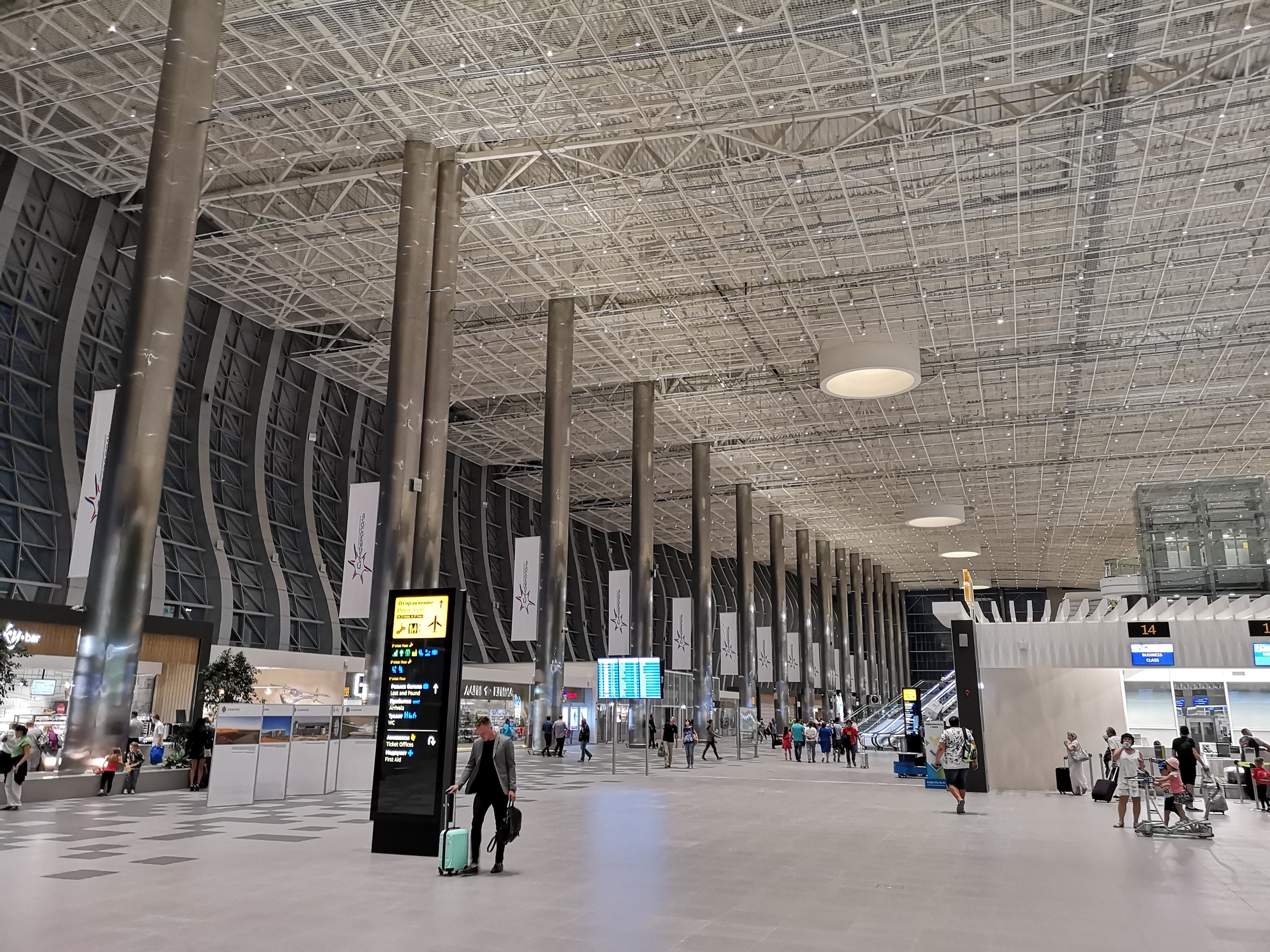
Check-in zone

On 21 January 1936, the Council of People's Commissars of the Crimean Autonomous Republic decided to allocate land and begin construction of the Simferopol Airport. Simferopol to Moscow flights began in May 1936. Before the Second World War, regular air travel was established between Simferopol and Kyiv, Kharkiv, and other airports. In 1957, a terminal was commissioned. Lighting equipment was installed on a dirt runway and IL-12, IL-14, and Mi-4 aircraft began landing at the airport. In 1960, a concrete runway with an apron and parking areas was constructed. The airport began to operate around the clock and in adverse weather conditions, using new aircraft such as Antonov An-10 and IL-18. In the 1950s and 1960s, the AN-2 carried cargo and passenger flights to regional centers of the Crimea, and the Mi-4 flew to Yalta. In the summer of 1960, a squadron of Tu-104 was organized for the first time in Ukrainian SSR. Starting in 1964, the An-24 was based at the airport.

Construction of the second runway, designed for IL-86, IL-76, IL-62, and Tu-154 aircraft, began in 1977. On 19 May 1982, Simferopol airport was the first in Ukrainian SSR to have a wide-IL-86. In subsequent years, this type of aircraft made an average of 5.6 daily flights to Moscow. In the summer of 1989, the airport was designated as a "western alternate airport" for landing the Buran spacecraft. In the early 2000s, the old runway 01R/19L (length 2700 m, PCN 22/R/B/X/T, accommodating a maximum weight of aircraft of 98 tonnes) was taken out of service because of its insufficient length and strength. Since then, it has been used as taxiway D with a length of 2100 m (the remaining 600 meters are unsuitable for taxiing). The second runway (01/19) is now in operation and is longer, wider and accommodates heavier aircraft.

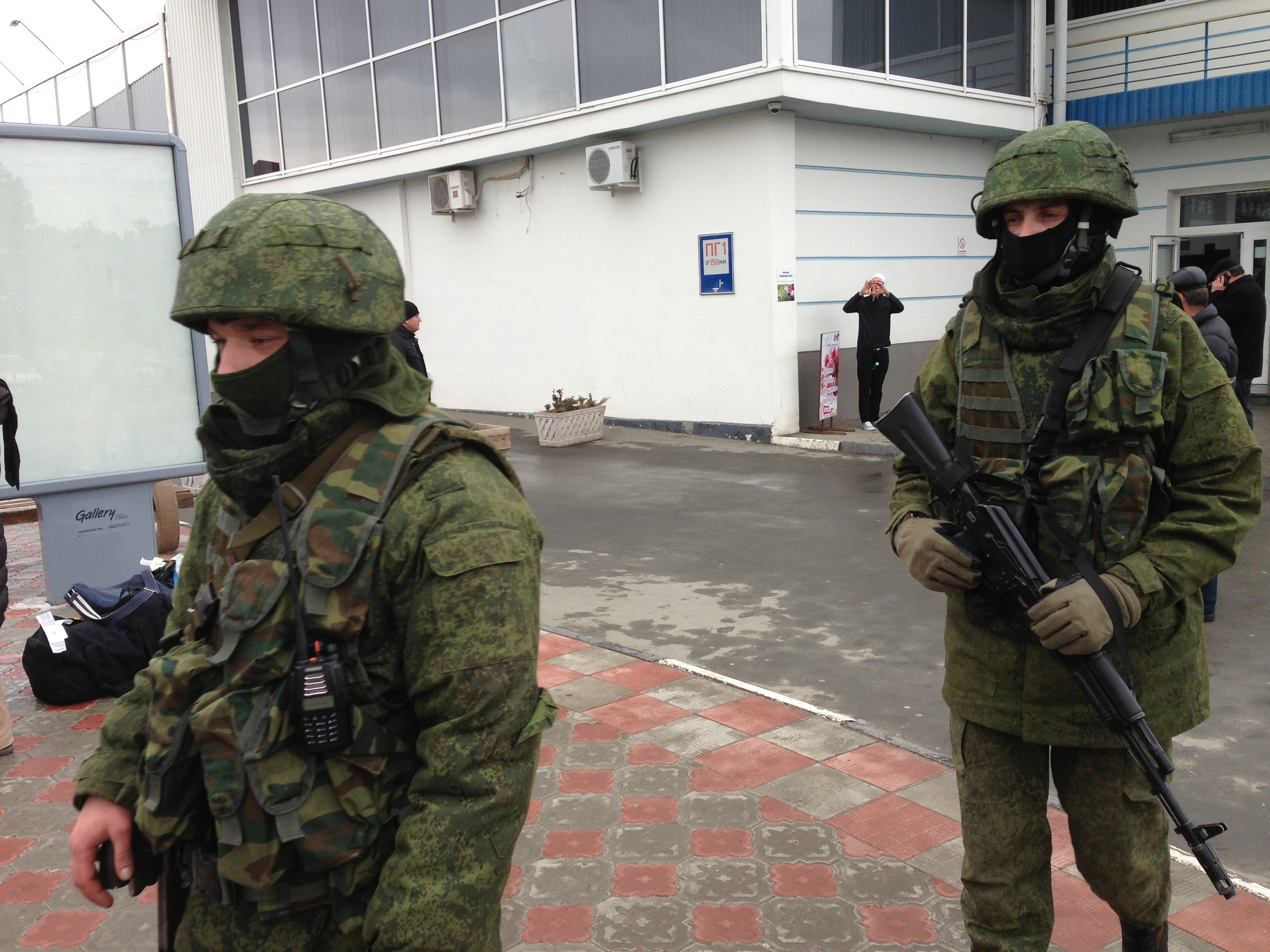
Russian soldiers without insignia at the airport on 28 February 2014

Following the 2014 Crimean crisis, Russian forces took control of the airport on 28 February 2014. Crimean airspace was closed and air traffic was disrupted for two days. On 11 March, Russian forces took over the control tower and closed Crimean airspace until the end of week. Ukraine International Flight PS65 was denied landing and diverted to Kyiv. With the Russian Takeover of the Airport, the International Civil Aviation Organization (ICAO) expressed concerns about the safety of international flights in the region and recommended airlines to avoid Crimean airspace. By the same token on 3 March 2014, the European Organisation for the Safety of Air Navigation (Eurocontrol), who also did not recognize the unilateral takeover of Ukrainian airspace by another country, had confirmed that the majority of transitional air routes have been closed, in accordance with the Chicago Convention. Ukrainian airlines also suspended routes to Simferopol.

Under the Russian control (Russia not being a member of Eurocontrol), the airport operates flights only to destinations in Russia. In June 2014, Prime Minister of Russia, Dmitry Medvedev, signed a Government resolution No.960 to open the airport for international flights, however, as of March 2016 no international flights were operated. On 29 July 2014, Rosaviation granted Chechen airline Grozny Avia permission to operate nonstop flights from Simferopol to the Armenian capital of Yerevan and Turkish cities of Istanbul and Antalya. However, these flights were technically domestic since they operated with a stopover in Anapa. Both of the routes were suspended the same year.

In May 2015, the Ukrainian Parliament voted in favor of renaming the Simferopol airport in honor of the Crimean-Tatar war hero Amet-khan Sultan. The airport's management team has responded that the authority to decree such changes is vested in the Russian government, and that they do not feel the need to respond to the Ukrainian parliament's ruling. Russian State Duma deputy, Vasiliy Likhachyov, has also released a statement dismissing this ruling as having no official authority.

In May 2016, construction began of a new terminal building, with a larger hall on a wave-like structure and 8 gates for flights. The new terminal was opened on 16 April 2018, with the first arrival at 8:30 AM of Nordwind Airlines from Moscow-Sheremetyevo, followed by other flights. The terminal was previously checked by 400 volunteers on 12 April 2018. The current terminal will be for VIP, business passengers and some space is going to be converted to the trolleybus and bus terminal.

This new terminal is 1 km west from the old terminal, between the main runway and the old one, making the eastern part of the airport useless. Eventually, the old runway (01R/19L) will be rebuilt and, with the runways being spaced >1 km apart, would be capable of parallel runway operations, like at Domodedovo, Berlin or Munich. The new terminal has 8 gates to air-bridges and 8 gates to apron buses, 16 escalators and 28 lifts, 55 check-in counters and the airport terminal is able to handle 6 million passenger annually.

In 2021, the airport became the sixth busiest one in Russia and occupied terrorities with 6.83 million passengers transiting through the airport, only behind the 3 Moscow airports (Sheremetyevo, Domodedovo and Vnukovo), St Petersburg's Pulkovo and Sochi/Adler airport.

== Airlines and destinations ==
From March 2014 onwards, all flights to/from Simferopol Airport with the exception of flights originating from Russia were cancelled due to Crimea's annexation by the Russian Federation. A flight to Istanbul, Turkey, was operated on 19 July 2014, and a flight to Yerevan, Armenia, was operated on 16 November 2014 by Grozny Avia, a Chechen airline. Technically both of these flights were not international because they had a stopover in Anapa Airport.

Dobrolyot, a Russian government-owned low-cost airline, was sanctioned by the European Union for operating flights to Simferopol. The airline was forced to close less than two months after it started operations.

As of 24 February 2022, all flights are suspended due to the Russian invasion of Ukraine.

Airlines	Destinations
Aeroflot	Krasnoyarsk–Yemelyanovo, Moscow–Sheremetyevo; Seasonal: Krasnodar
Alrosa	Seasonal: Novosibirsk, Ufa
Azimuth	Elista, Krasnodar, Mineralnye Vody, Rostov-on-Don
Ikar	Seasonal: Belgorod, Cheboksary, Kirov, Krasnoyarsk–Yemelyanovo, Magnitogorsk, Novosibirsk, Ulyanovsk–Baratayevka, Volgograd
IrAero	Saratov
Kosmos Airlines	Seasonal: Novokuznetsk, Tomsk
Kostroma Avia	Seasonal: Kostroma, Voronezh
Nordwind Airlines	Seasonal: Magnitogorsk, Ufa
Red Wings Airlines	Moscow–Domodedovo, Saint Petersburg; Seasonal: Omsk, Tomsk, Tyumen, Ufa
RusLine	Voronezh; Seasonal: Kursk, Penza, Ulyanovsk–Baratayevka, Volgograd
S7 Airlines	Irkutsk, Moscow–Domodedovo, Novosibirsk; Seasonal: Ivanovo, Kurgan, Lipetsk
Severstal Air Company	Seasonal: Cherepovets, Petrozavodsk
Smartavia	Seasonal: Arkhangelsk, Cheboksary, Moscow–Domodedovo, Syktyvkar, Ufa, Volgograd, Voronezh
Ural Airlines	Belgorod, Kazan, Kemerovo, Kirov, Krasnodar, Krasnoyarsk–Yemelyanovo, Magnitogorsk, Moscow–Domodedovo, Moscow–Sheremetyevo, Murmansk, Nizhnevartovsk, Nizhny Novgorod, Omsk, Saint Petersburg, Samara, Yekaterinburg; Seasonal: Chelyabinsk, Moscow–Zhukovsky, Rostov-on-Don
UVT Aero	Bugulma; Seasonal: Ufa
Yakutia Airlines	Seasonal: Irkutsk, Krasnodar, Mineralnye Vody, Moscow–Vnukovo, Yakutsk
Yamal Airlines	Tyumen; Seasonal: Kursk, Moscow–Domodedovo, Nizhnevartovsk, Omsk, Surgut

== Statistics ==
=== Annual traffic ===
Annual passenger traffic
Year	Passengers	% Change
2009	751,000	▼12.2%
2010	845,000	▲12%
2011	964,000	▲14.9%
2012	1,114,000	▲15.6%
2013	1,204,000	▲8.9%
2014	2,800,000	▲133%
2015	5,017,758	▲79%
2016	5,201,690	▲3.7%
2017	5,128,738	▼1.4%
2018	5,146,095	▲0.3%
2019	5,140,000	▼0.1%
2020	4,630,000	▼9.9%
2021	6,830,000	▲47.5%

== Ground transportation ==
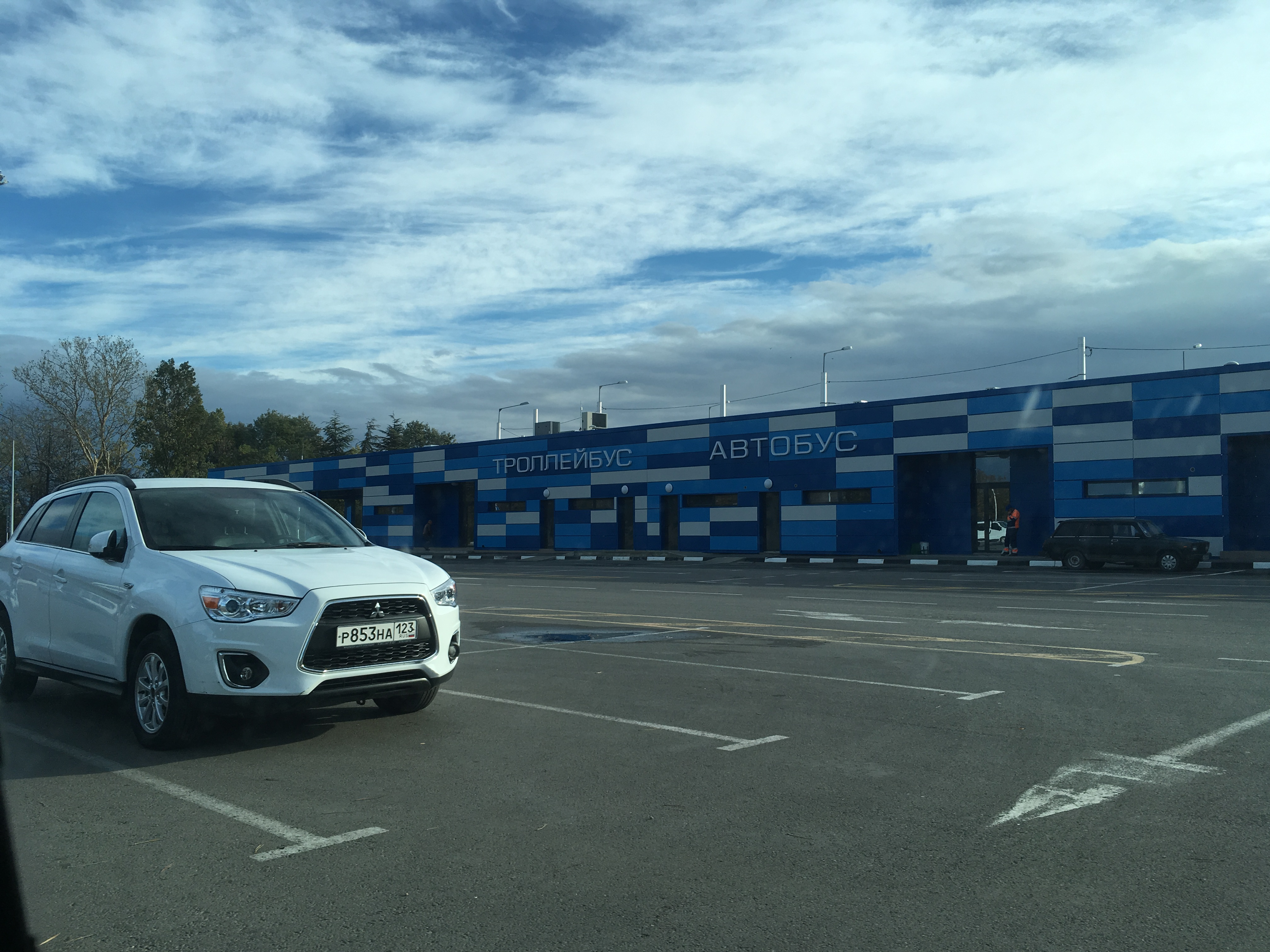
Bus station terminal in Simferopol Airport, 2017

Trolleybus Route 9 runs from the airport to the Simferopol railway station (and Kurortnaya bus station).

In 2015, a new direct express route has been launched. 24-hour Transexpress buses and trolleybuses connect the airport with the Simferopol Railway station in the city centre. The route was launched in May 2015 by Crimean Trolleybus, and runs every 10 minutes without stops in both directions.

Intercity trolleybus routes 54 and 55 run to the cities of Alushta, Yalta and resorts between them on the Southern Coast of Crimea. Route #55 Simferopol - Yalta, reestablished in April 2014, is known to be the world's longest trolleybus route.

The airport is connected with Sevastopol bus station by direct bus route.

== See also ==
- List of the busiest airports in Russia
- List of the busiest airports in Ukraine
- List of the busiest airports in Europe
- List of the busiest airports in the former USSR
