= UVT Aero =

Russian airline

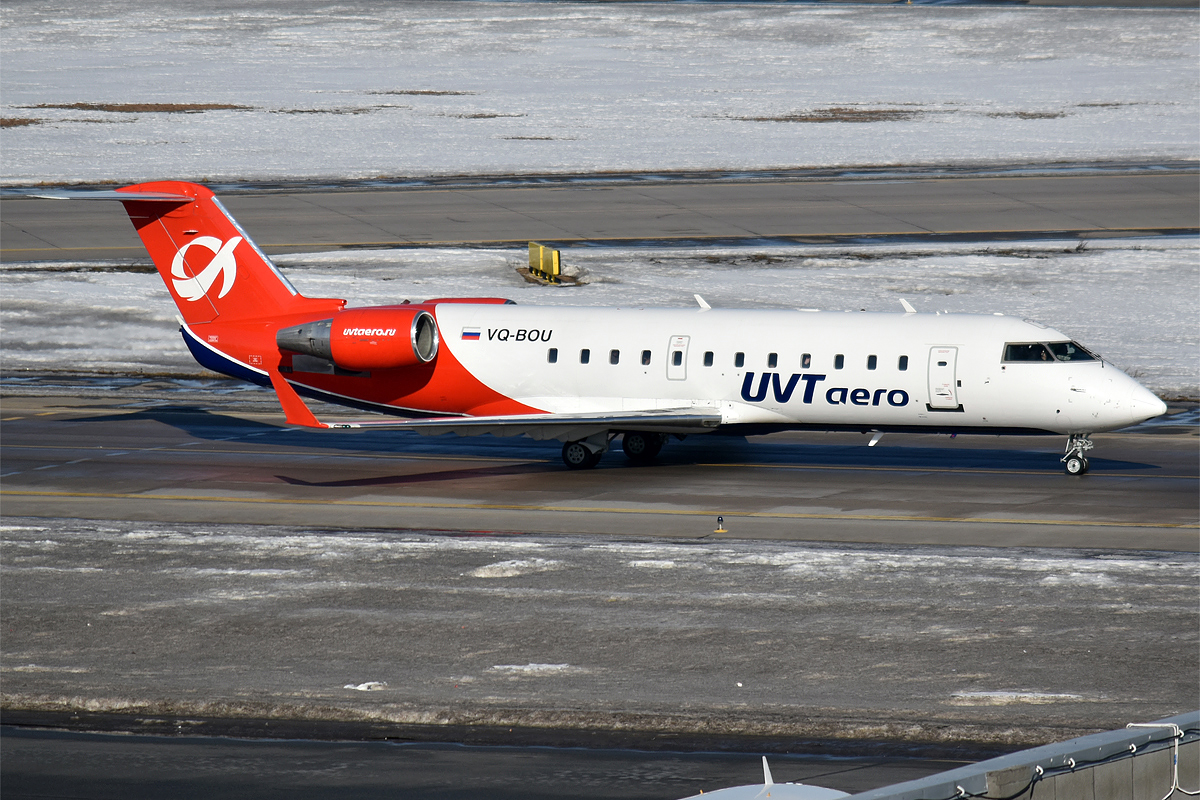
- UVT Aero Bombardier CRJ-200ER
IATA	ICAO	Call sign
RT	UVT	UVT
- Founded: 2015; 11 years ago
- Operating bases: Kazan; Bugulma
- Secondary hubs: Nizhnekamsk
- Fleet size: 5
- Destinations: 11
- Headquarters: Kazan, Tatarstan, Russia
- Key people: Trubaev Petr, CEO
- Website: uvtaero.ru/en/

UVT Aero (Russian: ЮВТ АЭРО) is a Russian airline headquartered in Kazan. Its main base is Ğabdulla Tuqay Kazan International Airport. It is currently banned from flying in the EU along with all other Russian airlines.

== History ==
On 8 July 2015 Tatarstan's Republic new airline UVT Aero was awarded with a license to carry out commercial passenger and charter flights, and also a license for freight transportation. In July 2015 regular flights from Bugulma to Moscow and from Kazan to Moscow and Saint Petersburg were launched. In August 2015 UVT Aero launched flights to Simferopol and Sochi. UVT Aero also participates in serving subsidized routes of federal importance.

== Destinations ==
UVT Aero serves following destinations:

=== Armenia ===
Yerevan

- Yerevan – Zvartnots Airport

=== Georgia ===
Autonomous Republic of Abkhazia

- Sokhumi - Sukhumi Babushara Airport

Adjara

- Batumi – Alexander Kartveli Batumi International Airport seasonal

Tbilisi

- Tbilisi – Shota Rustaveli Tbilisi International Airport

=== Kazakhstan ===
Almaty

- Almaty – Almaty International Airport Begins 25 July 2026

=== Russia ===
Altai

- Gorno-Altaysk - Gorno-Altaysk Airport

Astrakhan Oblast

- Astrakhan – Narimanovo Airport

Bashkortostan

- Ufa – Ufa International Airport

Chechnya

- Grozny - Kadyrov Grozny International Airport resumes 15 October 2026

Chelyabinsk Oblast

- Chelyabinsk – Balandino Airport

Dagestan

- Makhachkala – Uytash Airport

Kabardino-Balkaria

- Nalchik - Nalchik Airport

Karelia

- Petrozavodsk - Petrozavodsk Airport Seasonal

Kemerovo Oblast

- Novokuznetsk – Spichenkovo Airport

Komi

- Usinsk – Usinsk Airport

Krasnodar Krai

- Gelendzhik – Gelendzhik Airport Terminated
- Krasnodar – Pashkovsky Airport Terminated
- Sochi – Adler-Sochi International Airport

Moscow / Moscow Oblast

- Moscow
  - Moscow Domodedovo Airport Terminated
  - Vnukovo International Airport
  - Zhukovsky International Airport Terminated

Murmansk Oblast

- Murmansk – Emperor Nicholas II Murmansk Airport Seasonal

Nizhny Novgorod Oblast

- Nizhny Novgorod – Strigino Airport

Novosibirsk Oblast

- Novosibirsk – Tolmachevo Airport

Orenburg Oblast

- Orenburg – Orenburg Airport

Perm Krai

- Perm – Bolshoye Savino Airport

Omsk Oblast

- Omsk – Omsk Tsentralny Airport

Orenburg Oblast

- Orenburg – Orenburg Tsentralny Airport begins 4 May 2025

Saint Petersburg / Leningrad Oblast

- Pulkovo International Airport

Samara Oblast

- Samara – Kurumoch Airport

Sverdlovsk Oblast

- Yekaterinburg – Koltsovo Airport

Tatarstan

- Bugulma – Bugulma Airport Base
- Kazan – Ğabdulla Tuqay Kazan International Airport Base
- Nizhnekamsk / Naberezhnye Chelny – Begishevo Airport focus city

Tomsk Oblast

- Tomsk – Tomsk Kamov Airport

Tyumen Oblast

- Khanty-Mansi Autonomous Okrug
  - Khanty-Mansiysk – Khanty-Mansiysk Airport
  - Nizhnevartovsk – Nizhnevartovsk Airport
  - Surgut – Farman Salmanov Surgut Airport
- Tobolsk – Tobolsk Remezov Airport focus city

Voronezh Oblast

- Voronezh – Chertovitskoye Airport Terminated

Yaroslavl Oblast

- Yaroslavl – Golden Ring Yaroslavl International Airport

=== Russia / Ukraine (Note: Disputed. See Annexation of Crimea by the Russian Federation.) ===
Autonomous Republic of Crimea

- Simferopol – Simferopol International Airport Terminated

=== Uzbekistan ===
- Tashkent – Islam Karimov Tashkent International Airport

== Fleet ==
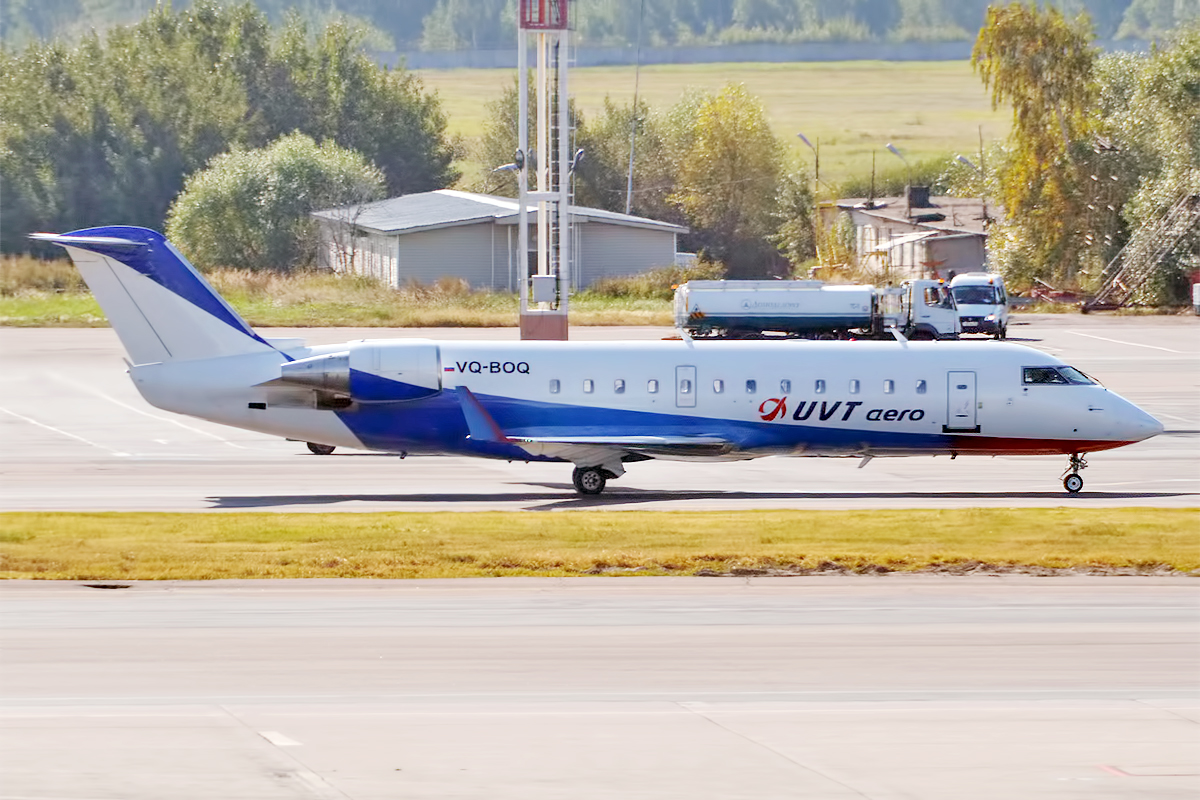
UVT Aero CRJ-200 at Domodedovo Airport

As of August 2025, UVT Aero operates the following aircraft:

UVT Aero fleet
Aircraft	In fleet	Orders	Passengers
Bombardier CRJ200	5	—	50
Tupolev Tu-214	—	2	210
Total	5	2	
