= Goz =

Goz or GOZ may refer to:

== People ==
- Balázs Gőz (born 1992), Hungarian hockey player
- Gottfried Bernhard Göz (1708–1774), German Rococo artist
- Harry Goz (1932–2003), American actor

== Other uses ==
- Gameover ZeuS
- Gorna Oryahovitsa Airport, serving Veliko Tarnovo, Bulgaria
- Gozarkhani language
- Grozny Avia, Russian airline
- Obukhov State Plant, a machine-building factory in Russia
- GoZ, a component of ZBrush modelling application
