= Nizhnevartovsk State University =

University in Nizhnevartovsk, Russia

- Нижневартовский государственный университет
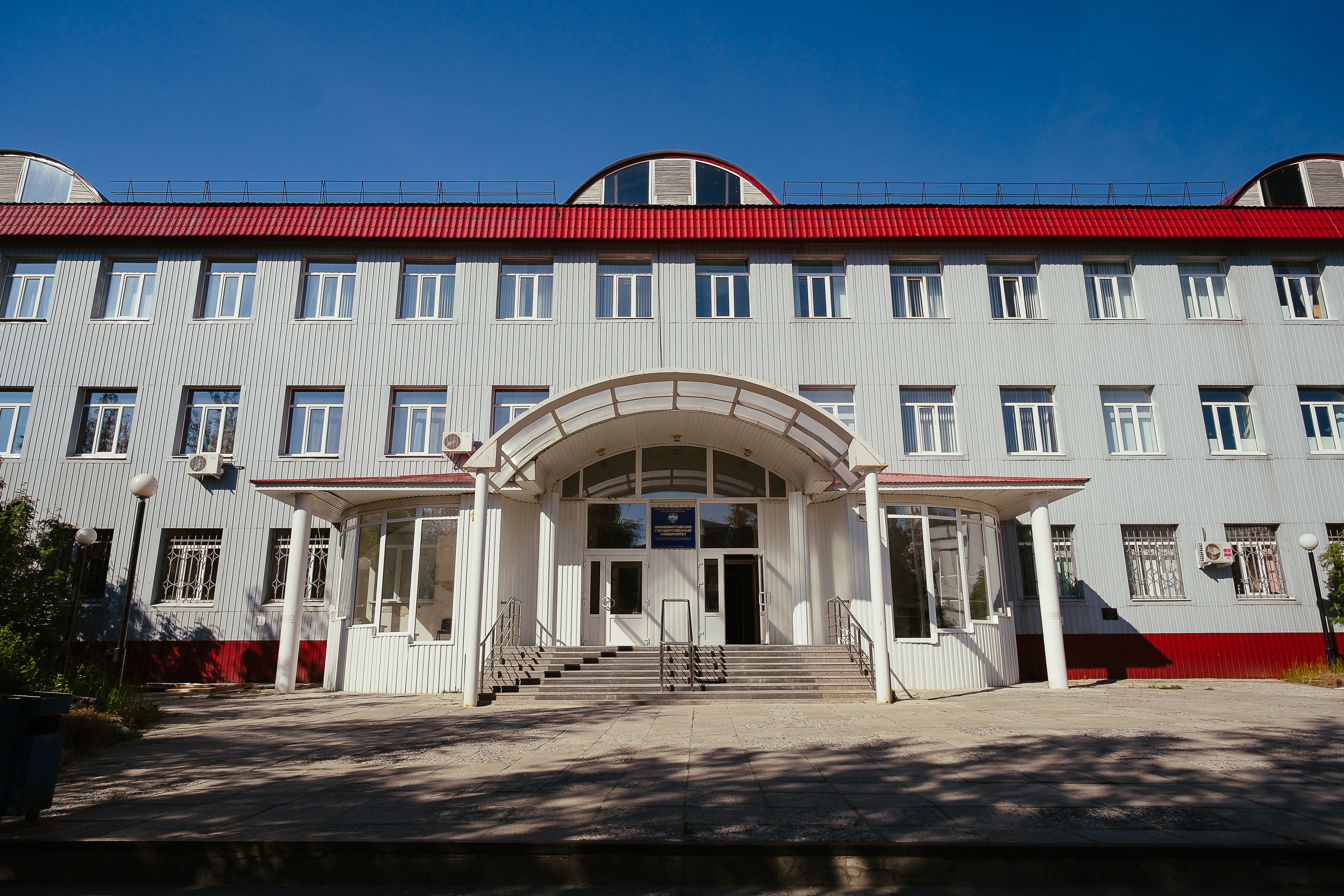
- Motto: Prospero populi educatione
- Established: 1988
- President: Anatoly Karpov
- Rector: Sergey Gorlov
- Location: Nizhnevartovsk, Russia; 60°55′50″N 76°36′9″E
- Colors
- Website: nvsu.ru

Nizhnevartovsk State University (NVSU) (Russian: Нижневартовский государственный университет) is a higher education institution located in Nizhnevartovsk.

== History ==
On July 12, 1988, a branch of the Tobolsk State Pedagogical Institute named after Dmitri Mendeleev was established in Nizhnevartovsk. The branch comprised three faculties: the Physics and Mathematics, Philology, and Pedagogy and Methods of Primary Education, initially employing 25 teachers and enrolling 158 students.

In 2005, the institute was renamed Nizhnevartovsk State Humanities University. In 2013, it became Nizhnevartovsk State University. For several years, based on the annual ranking by the Federal Agency for Education, the university has been among the top ten pedagogical, linguistic, and humanities universities in Russia. According to the 2009 ranking of pedagogical, humanities, and linguistic universities compiled by the Ministry of Education and Science of the Russian Federation, the Nizhnevartovsk State Humanities University ranked 5th among 74 universities in Russia. In 2017, the university was ranked 191st in Russia by Interfax.

In 2019, the Nizhnevartovsk State University won the national competition "Best Universities of the Russian Federation – 2019." In 2021, the university became a laureate of the V All-Russian Competition "100 Best Universities of the Russian Federation – 2021." In 2023, eight educational programs were recognized among the most innovative educational programs in Russia. Eighteen educational programs were included in the first, second, third, and fourth leagues of the Subject National Aggregated Ranking by broad fields of study. The Nizhnevartovsk State University conducts research on the impacts of humans on the environmental quality of Western Siberia.

The university has over 5,000 undergraduate and postgraduate students.

== International collaboration ==
The university is a member of the University of the Arctic. UArctic is an international cooperative network based in the Circumpolar Arctic region, consisting of more than 200 universities, colleges, and other organizations with an interest in promoting education and research in the Arctic region. The participation has been paused after the beginning of the Russo-Ukrainian War in 2022.
