= Tobolsk Remezov Airport =

Airport in Tobolsk, Russia

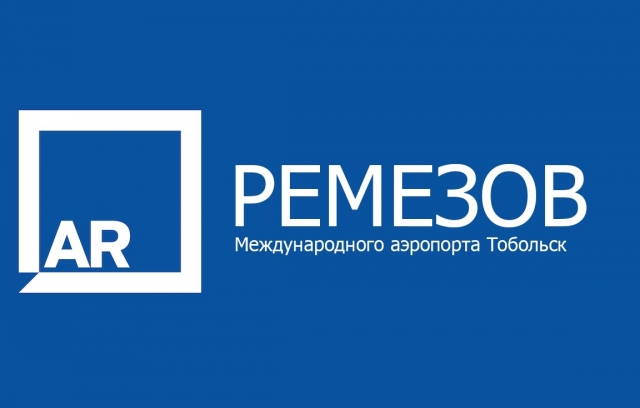

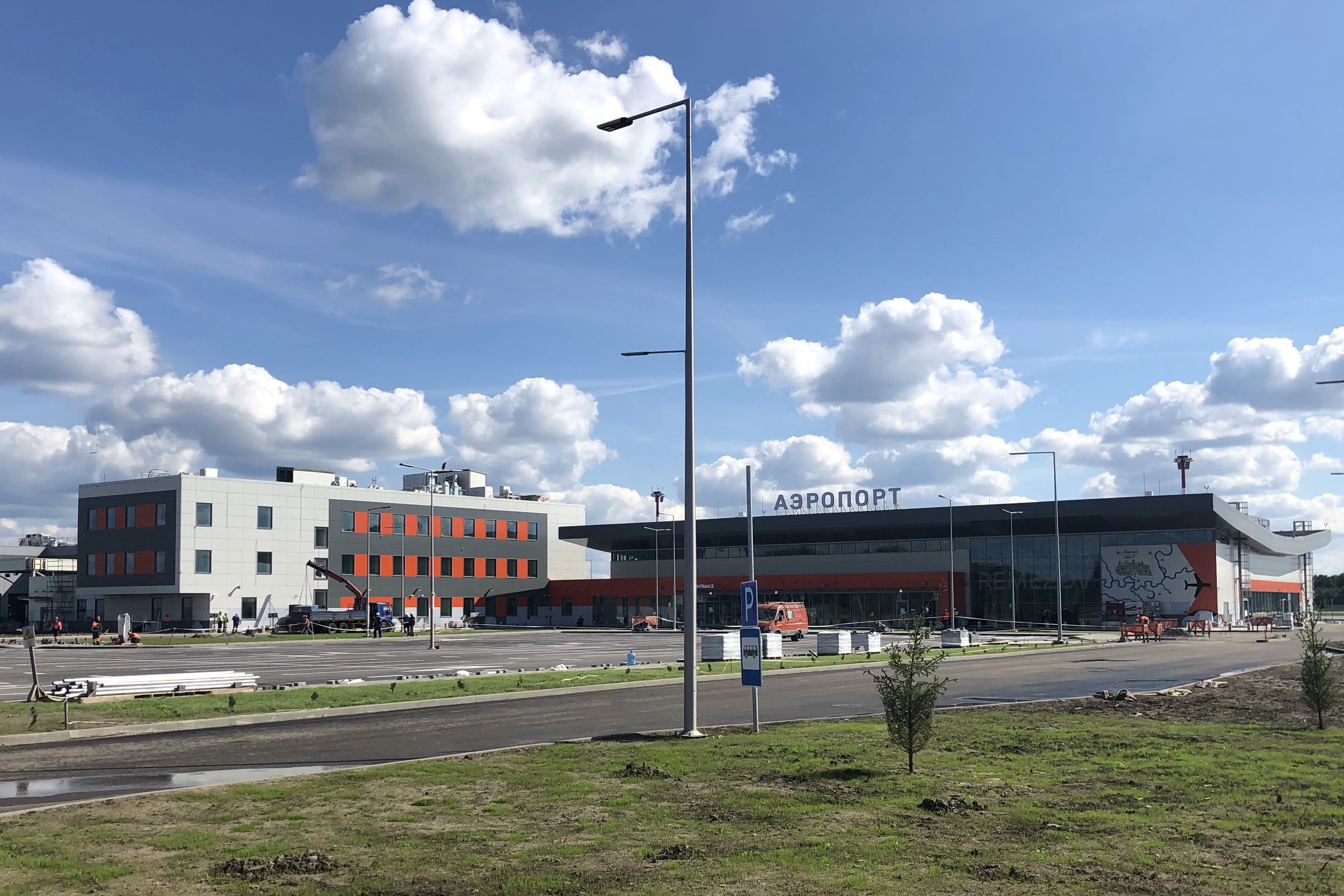
- IATA: RMZ; ICAO: USTJ

Summary
- Airport type: Public
- Owner: Sibur
- Operator: Airports of Regions
- Serves: Tobolsk
- Location: Tobolsk, Russia
- Hub for: UVT Aero
- Elevation AMSL: 157 ft / 48 m
- Coordinates: 58°03′30″N 68°20′55″E
- Website: ar-rmz.ru
- Interactive map of Tobolsk Remezov Airport

Runways
Direction	Length		Surface
Direction	ft	m	Surface
08/26	7.875	2.400	Concrete

Tobolsk Remezov Airport (Russian: Аэропорт Тобольск (Ремезов)) (IATA: RMZ, ICAO: USTJ) is a civil airport located about 10 km south of the city of Tobolsk. The airport received its first passenger flight on 24 September 2021.

== Airlines and destinations ==
As of May 2026 airport serves following destinations:

Airlines	Destinations
UVT Aero	Kazan, Moscow-Vnukovo, Nizhnekamsk, Novosibirsk, Novy Urengoy, Omsk, Saint Petersburg, Samara
