= Vnukovo International Airport =

International airport serving Moscow, Russia

Vnukovo International Airport Международный аэропорт Внуково

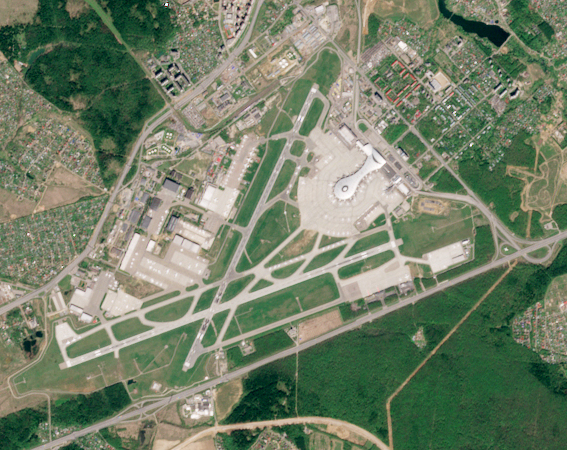
- Satellite view in May 2020
- IATA: VKO; ICAO: UUWW; LID: ВНК

Summary
- Airport type: Public
- Operator: JSC "Vnukovo Airport"
- Serves: Moscow metropolitan area
- Location: Moscow
- Hub for: Azimuth; Azur Air; Gazpromavia; I-Fly; Pobeda; RusLine; Utair
- Elevation AMSL: 209 m (686 ft)
- Coordinates: 55°35′46″N 37°16′03″E
- Website: vnukovo.ru

Map
- Location of the airport in Moscow Oblast Location of the airport in Russia Location of the airport in Europe

Runways
Direction	Length		Surface
Direction	m	ft	Surface
06/24	3,500	11,483	Concrete
01/19	3,060	10,039	Concrete

Statistics (2018)
- Passengers: 21,478,486
- Aircraft movements: 163,600
- Sources: Russian Federal Air Transport Agency (see also provisional 2018 statistics)

Vnukovo International Airport (Note: Russian: Международный аэропорт Внуково, IPA: [ˈvnukəvə]) (Internal code: ВНК, IATA: VKO, ICAO: UUWW) is a dual-runway international airport located in Vnukovo District, 28 km (17 mi) southwest of the centre of Moscow, Russia. It is one of the four major airports that serve Moscow, along with Sheremetyevo, Domodedovo and Zhukovsky.

In 2019, the airport handled 24.01 million passengers, representing an increase of 12% compared to the previous year. Vnukovo was the eleventh-busiest airport in Europe in 2021 but had a strong decline in traffic and dropped to 30th place in 2022 as a consequence of sanctions following the Russian invasion of Ukraine. As of 2025 it is the 3rd busiest airport in Russia and Post-Soviet states as well as the 41st-busiest airport in Europe. The airport was formally named "Vnukovo Andrei Tupolev International Airport", (Note: Russian: Аэропорт Внуково имени А. Н. Туполева, romanized: Aeroport Vnukovo imeni A. N. Tupoleva) after Andrei Tupolev.

== History ==
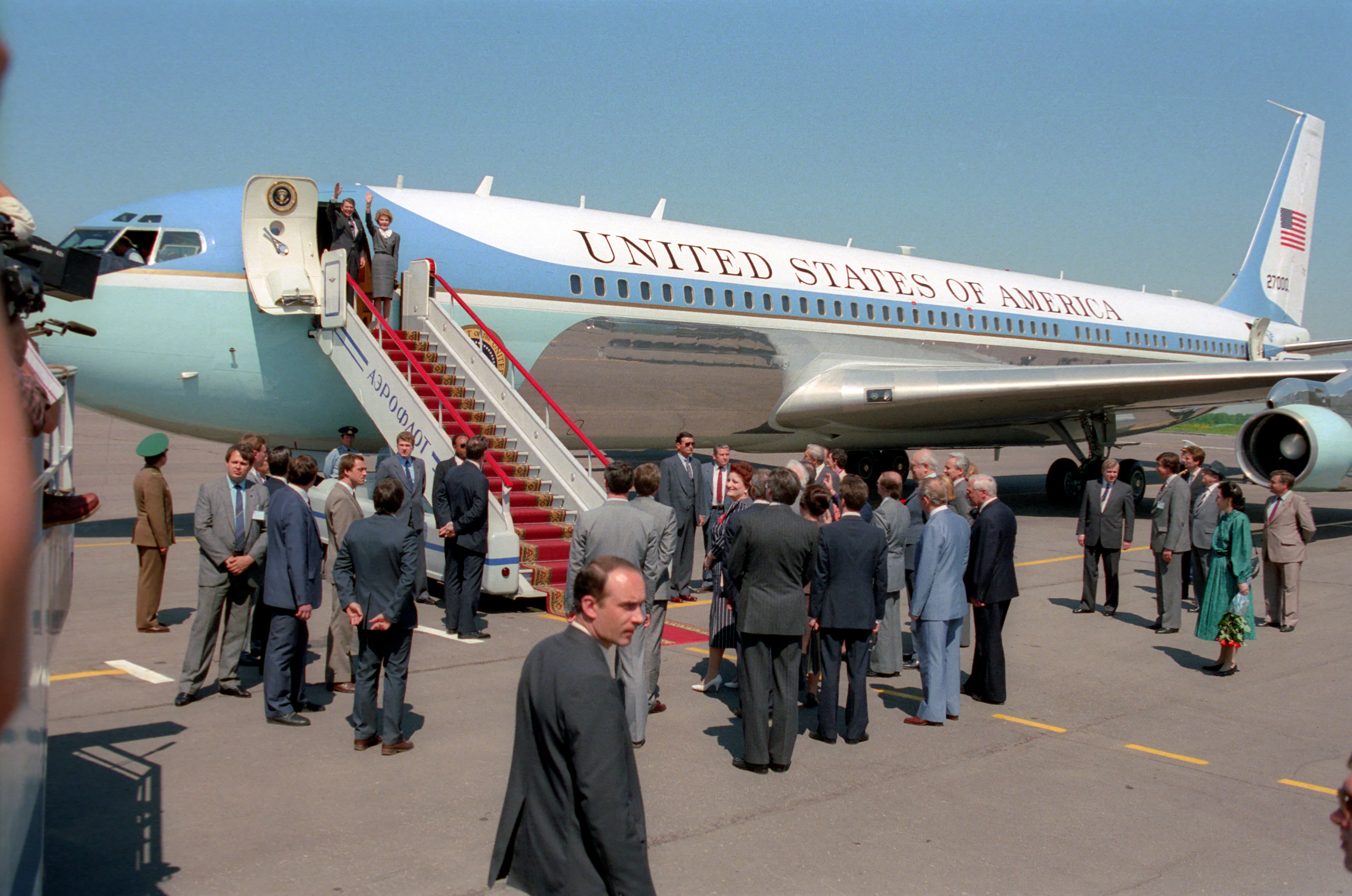
US President Ronald Reagan at Vnukovo in 1988

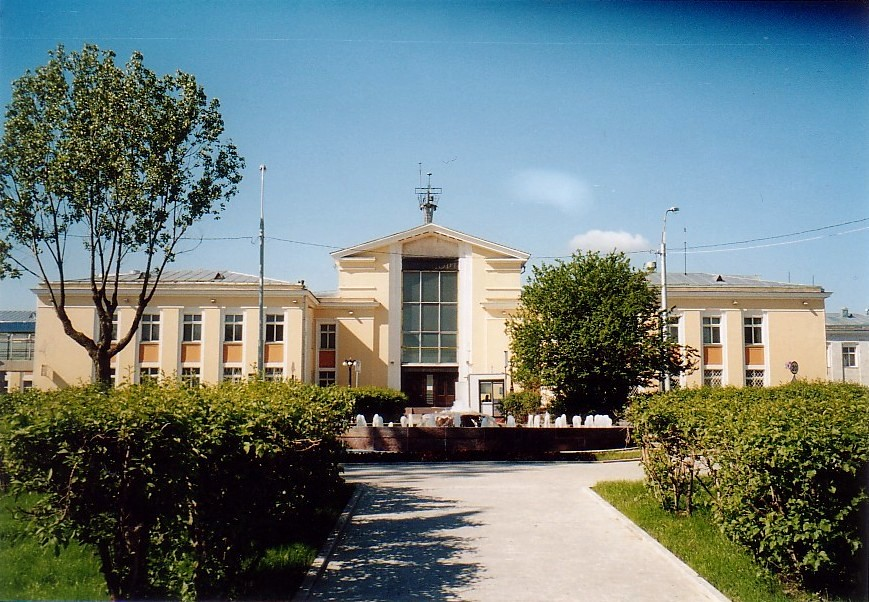
Old terminal (pictured in 2000)

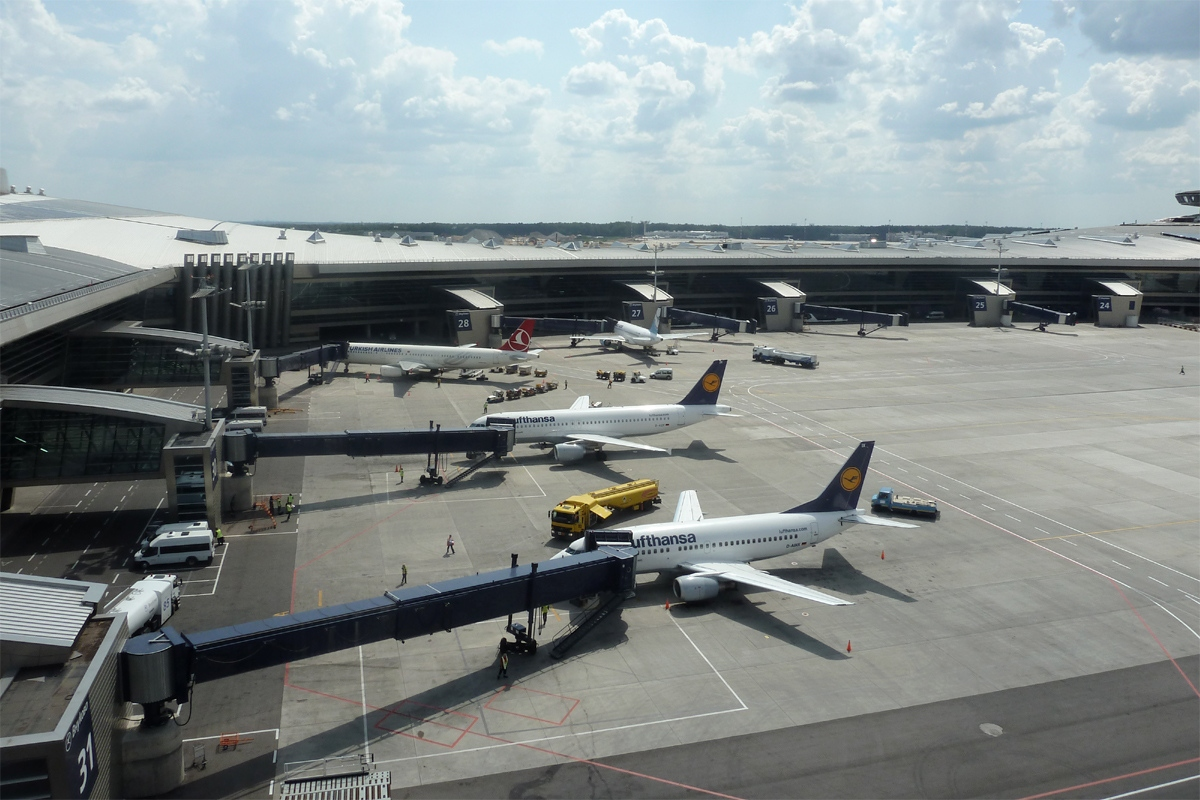
Apron view

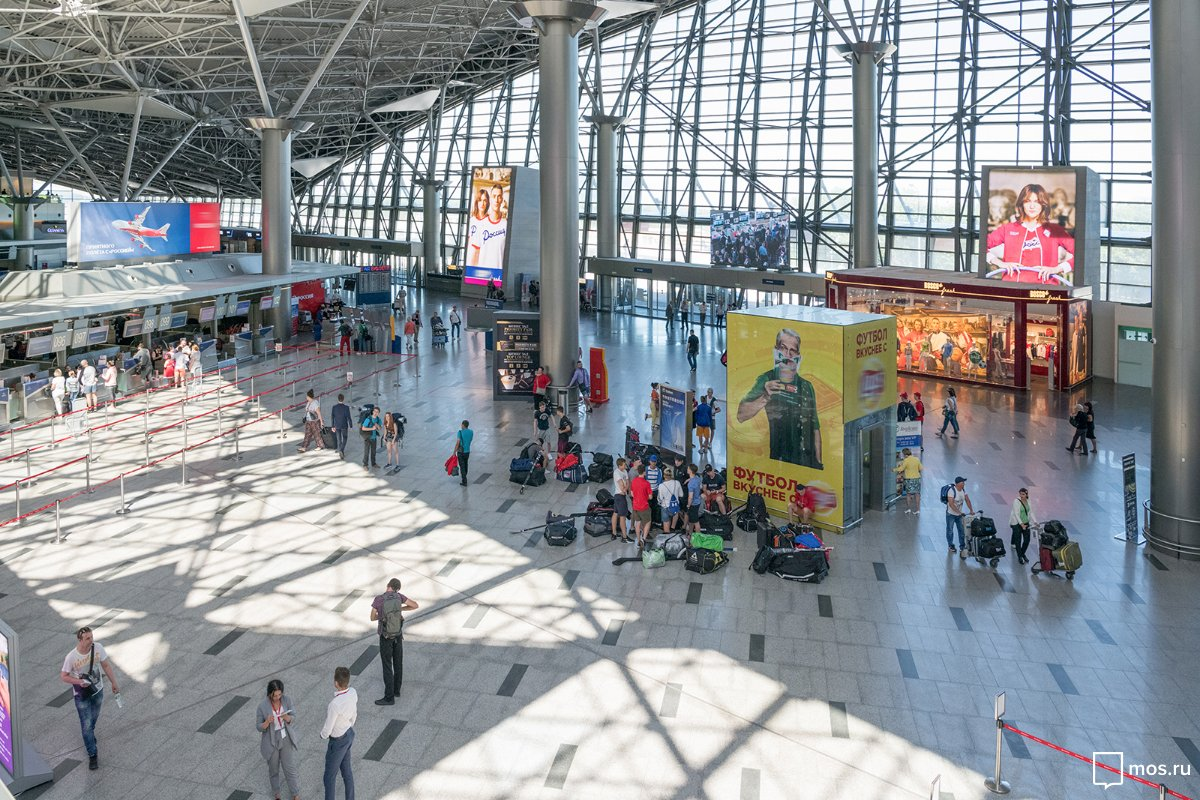
Terminal A

Vnukovo is Moscow's oldest operating airport. It was opened and used for military operations during the Second World War but became a civilian facility after the war. Its construction was approved by the Soviet government in 1936 because the older Khodynka Aerodrome (located much closer to the city centre, but closed by the 1980s) was becoming overloaded.

On 15 September 1956, the Tupolev Tu-104 jetliner made its first passenger flight from Moscow Vnukovo to Irkutsk via Omsk.

On 4 November 1957, a plane carrying Romanian Workers' Party officials, including the most prominent politicians of Communist Romania (Chivu Stoica, Alexandru Moghioroș, Ştefan Voitec, Nicolae Ceauşescu, Leonte Răutu, and Grigore Preoteasa), was involved in an accident at Vnukovo Airport. Preoteasa, who was the minister of foreign affairs at the time, was killed, as was the aircraft's crew. Several others were injured.

The first passenger flights of the IL-18 (Moscow to Alma-Ata on 20 April 1959) and Tu-114 (Moscow to Khabarovsk on 24 April 1961) were also made from Vnukovo Airport. In 1980, Vnukovo was expanded because of the 22nd Summer Olympic Games. In 1993, Vnukovo Airport became a joint-stock company.

A massive reconstruction and strategic development programme commenced at Vnukovo International in late 2003, following the transfer by the federal government of the controlling stake in the airport to the government of Moscow.

As part of the Airport Strategic Development Plan, these projects were completed between 2003 and 2010:

- April 17, 2004: New Terminal B was opened. The terminal currently handles international passengers, but in the future, it will be converted to handle domestic flights or to fulfill any other dedicated functions to be determined at a later date. The terminal's total floor space offering stands at 80,000 m^{2} (861,113 sq ft)), allowing for an annual passenger throughput capacity of four million.
- August 7, 2005: Vnukovo's express rail link to Kiyevsky Rail Terminal was opened.
- December 2010: New Terminal A is put into operation.

Vnukovo is Europe's busiest airport for international flights by larger private planes.

== Location and capacity ==
Of the three Moscow airports, Vnukovo is the highest (204 m (669 ft 3 in) above sea level), so in case of fog, it has frequently served as an alternative airport.

The airfield has two intersecting runways of 3,500 m (11,482 ft 11 in) and 3,060 m (10,039 ft 4 in) in length. Each runway is 60 m (196 ft 10 in) wide, with 10 m (32 ft 10 in)-wide safety shoulders on each side. The joint runway capacity is 60 aircraft movements per hour. Runway 24 is mostly used for departures, while Runway 01 is for landings.

The airport has two passenger terminals (Terminal A and Terminal B), one general aviation terminal (for charter and business flights), one cargo terminal, and 60 aircraft stands.

The airport can handle a maximum of 10,100 passengers per hour, and 4,000 people are employed there. In 2013, the airport handled almost 11.18 million passengers, representing a 15.3% increase compared to 2012. In February 2014 the airport handled 722,500 passengers, an increase of 23.8% compared to February 2013, partly attributed to expansion by Utair.

Vnukovo Airport is equipped with a VIP hall, which is used by many political leaders and important people visiting Russia. The Russian President also uses Vnukovo's VIP facility. The Tupolev airliner rework facility is located at the edge of the airport, and major overhaul and modification programmes are carried out in several large aircraft hangars. On the northern perimeter of the airport, the government VIP transport wing is located, operating head-of-state flights for high-ranking government officials. Thus, the airport is occasionally closed for regular flights when VIP flights arrive or depart.

== Further expansion ==
The prospective development programme was intended to last until 2015, and was aimed at transforming Vnukovo International into an air transportation hub of international significance.

A new international passenger Terminal A will have a total floor space of 250,000 m^{2} (2,700,000 sq ft) and passenger throughput capacity of 7,800 passengers per hour, making a total capacity of 18–20 million passengers annually. This will open up many opportunities for the tenant airlines to expand and improve the quality of their customer service at the airport, and ensure the introduction of international-quality service and comfort overall. The sprawling terminal building will be located on the site of the existing domestic passenger terminal, and will also serve as a springboard for the subsequent development of the entire adjacent landside area both next to the terminal and further out towards Vnukovo Settlement. The oldest of the Vnukovo passenger terminals, dating back to 1941, will be demolished by the time construction of the new one goes ahead (it was started to be dismantled in November 2005). The existing domestic Terminal 2, built in the late 1970s, will continue in operation until its eventual demolition during the final phase of construction and replacement with the new terminal.

The expansion plans include lengthening one of the two V-configured runways (3,500 m (11,482 ft 11 in) and 3,060 m (10,039 ft 4 in) long) to 3,800 m (12,467 ft 2 in) and upgrading the instrument landing system from the present CAT II to CAT III. The existing taxiways are to be extended as part of the expansion and new ones will also be built, along with a brand new control tower, an extension to the cargo terminal, and a multistory car park.

== Terminals ==
Terminal A is the only terminal used both for domestic and international flights. Terminals B and D are out of service as of October 2017.

Vnukovo-2 serves as highly secure, restricted government and diplomatic terminal.

Vnukovo-3 opened in 2006 is a terminal for international flights and has a total area of 7000 m^{2}. It has two terminals for passengers and guests of domestic and international flight.

== Airlines and destinations ==
Airlines	Destinations
Aero Nomad Airlines	Bishkek, Osh
Air Tanzania	Dar es Salaam, Zanzibar
AJet	Ankara, Istanbul–Sabiha Gökçen
ALROSA	Mirny, Novosibirsk, Saint Petersburg
Armenia Airways	Yerevan
Azerbaijan Airlines	Baku, Ganja
azimuth	Apatity/Kirovsk, Batumi, Kutaisi, Magnitogorsk, Navoi, Petrozavodsk, Pskov, Saint Petersburg, Tbilisi, Termez, Urgench, Yerevan
Azur Air	Seasonal charter: Hambantota–Mattala, Malé, Phuket
Belavia	Homiel, Minsk
flydubai	Dubai–International
flynas	Jeddah, Riyadh
FlyOne	Tashkent, Yerevan
Gazpromavia	Seasonal charter: Bovanenkovo, Nadym, Novy Urengoy, Tyumen, Ufa, Ukhta, Yamburg
Georgian Airways	Batumi, Tbilisi
Iraqi Airways	Baghdad
Nesma Airlines	Seasonal charter: Hurghada
Pegasus Airlines	Antalya, Istanbul–Sabiha Gökçen, İzmir
Pobeda	Antalya, Chelyabinsk, Dubai–Al Maktoum, Gazipaşa/Alanya, Gyumri, Istanbul, Kaliningrad, Khujand, Krasnodar, Makhachkala, Mineralnye Vody, Minsk, Nalchik, Nukus, Nizhnevartovsk, Novosibirsk, Omsk, Osh, Perm, Saint Petersburg, Samara, Samarqand, Saratov, Sochi, Tashkent, Termez, Tyumen, Ufa, Ulyanovsk–Baratayevka, Vladikavkaz, Yekaterinburg
Red Sea Airlines	Seasonal charter: El Alamein, Hurghada, Sharm El Sheikh
Rossiya Airlines	Saint Petersburg
RusLine	Tambov, Yaroslavl, Yoshkar-Ola (suspended), Sukhumi
SCAT Airlines	Almaty, Astana, Şymkent
Shirak Avia	Yerevan
Turkish Airlines	Istanbul; Seasonal charter: Antalya, Bodrum, Dalaman
Utair	Antalya, Baku, Bukhara, Dubai–Al Maktoum, Dushanbe, Fergana, Ganja, Gelendzhik, Grozny, Khanty-Mansiysk, Khujand, Kogalym, Krasnodar, Krasnoyarsk–International, Lankaran, Makhachkala, Mineralnye Vody, Nakhchivan, Naryan-Mar, Noyabrsk, Saint Petersburg, Samara, Samarqand, Sharm El Sheikh, Sochi, Surgut, Syktyvkar, Tashkent, Tyumen, Ufa, Ukhta, Usinsk, Vladikavkaz, Yerevan
UVT Aero	Bugulma, Kazan, Sukhumi, Tobolsk
Uzbekistan Airways	Andizhan, Bukhara, Fergana, Namangan, Navoiy, Nukus, Qarshi, Samarqand, Tashkent, Termez, Urgench
Vologda Aviation Enterprise	Vologda
Yakutia Airlines	Mineralnye Vody, Nalchik, Neryungri, Novosibirsk, Sochi, Yakutsk

== Statistics ==
=== Annual traffic ===
Annual passenger traffic
Year	Passengers	% change
2010	9,460,292	Steady
2011	8,197,162	▼13.4%
2012	9,699,452	▲18.3%
2013	11,175,142	▲15.2%
2014	12,733,118	▲14.0%
2015	15,815,129	▲24.2%
2016	13,946,688	▼11.8%
2017	18,139,000	▲30.1%
2018	21,478,000	▲18.4%
2019	24,001,521	▲14.4%
2020	12,565,241	▼47.4%
2021	17,999,084	▲43.2%
2022	16,400,000	▼8.9%
2023	14,500,000	▼11.6%
2024	16,000,000	▲10.3%

== Ground transportation ==
=== Rail ===
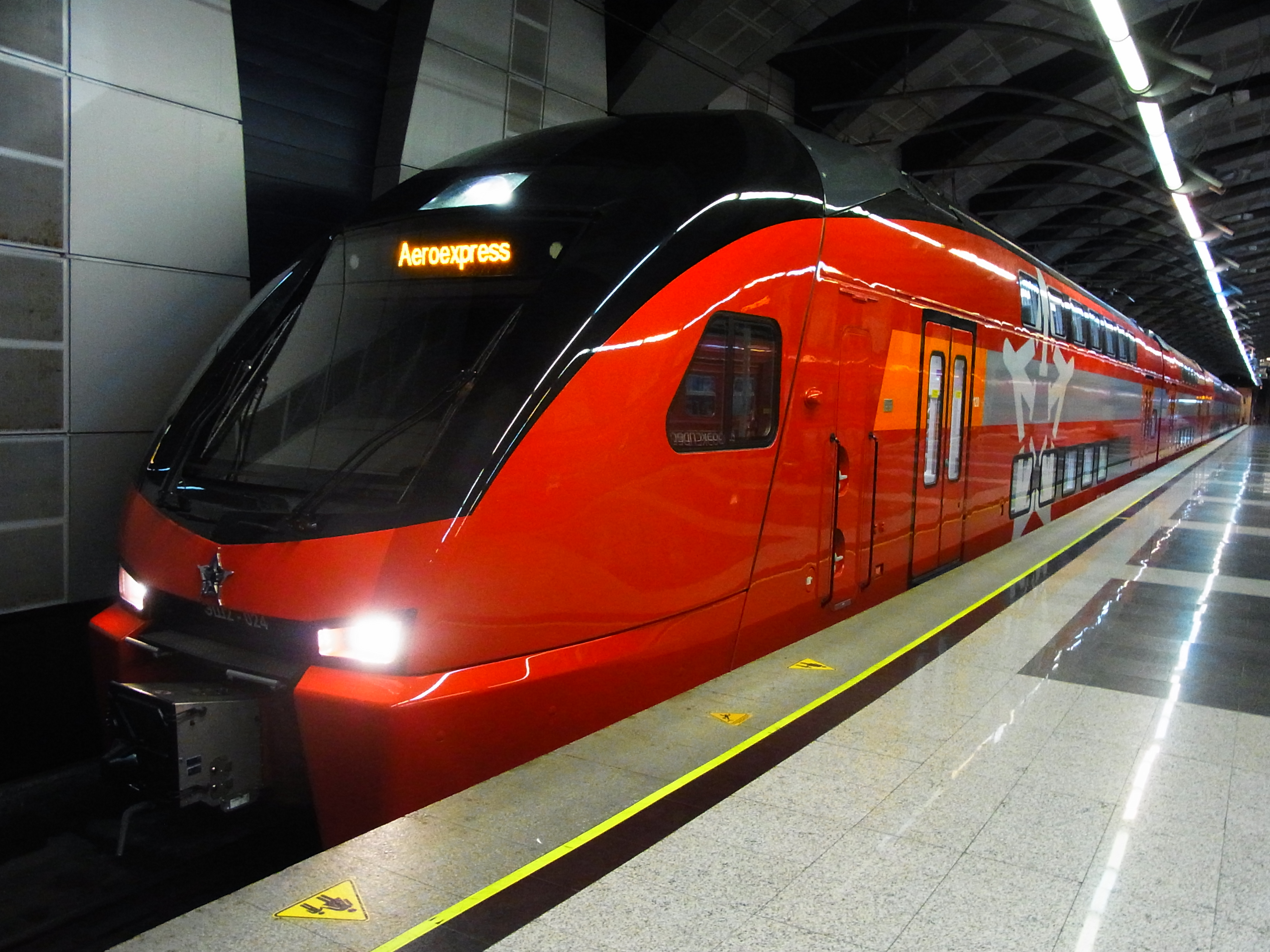
A double-deck Aeroexpress ESh2, at Vnukovo Airport train station

Before 31 July 2024 Aeroexpress direct line was connecting Vnukovo Airport and Kiyevsky Rail Terminal in Moscow city centre (operations launched in August 2005). Since 1 August 2024 railway line is only served by Central Suburban Passenger Company.

=== Bus ===
Moscow city can be reached by the municipal Mosgortrans bus lines: 611 - reaches two consecutive stations (Troparyovo and Yugo-Zapadnaya) of Moscow Metro Sokolnicheskaya Line, 611k (Russian: 611к) reaches only the nearest Salaryevo station of Moscow Metro Sokolnicheskaya Line, but avoids the often congested crossing with MKAD road; nearby Rumyantsevo station is only easily accessible on the way to the airport, not away from it. The fare is 50 rubles (as of September, 2016; eq. to 0.77 US$), travel time 20-35 min. by schedule.
Private marshrutka line 45 also serves this direction. One-way journey costs 150 rubles (as of February 2016; eq. to 2 US$). Due to heavy traffic in Moscow, journey takes 15 minutes to 1 hour.

=== Taxi ===
Several taxi services to Moscow city and suburbs are available at the airport. Uber, Gett, Yandex.Taxi and local transportation network companies offer flat rate trips to anywhere in Moscow.

=== Metro ===
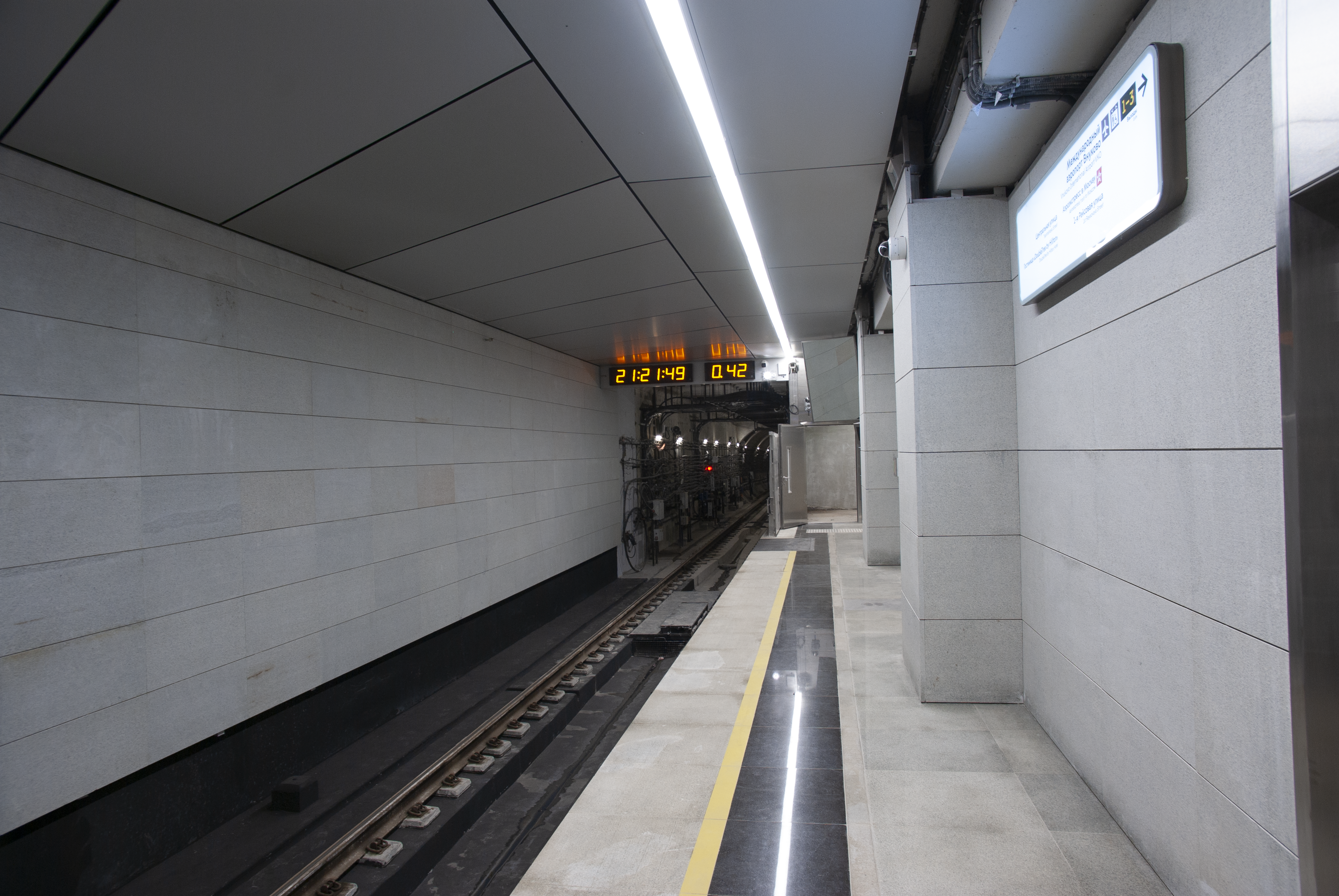
Vnukovo Airport Metro station, 2023

Since 6 September 2023 Airport is served by "Aeroport Vnukovo" Metro station, terminus of Moscow Metro Line 8a (Kalininsko-Solntsevskaya Line).

== Other facilities ==
Previously Vnukovo Airlines had its head office at the airport.

== Ownership ==
The airport is co-owned by the Russian state and Russian businessman Vitaly Vantsev and his partners. In March 2018, Qatar Airways announced plans to buy a 25 percent stake in Vnukovo Airport.

== Accidents and incidents ==
- On 21 December 1943, a Lisunov Li-2 crashed while on a training flight due to a defect in the left rear fuel tank.
- On 4 March 1944, Douglas C-47A crashed into a Bell P-39Q Airacobra on the ground while attempting to execute a go-around.
- On 5 November 1946, Douglas C-47B crashed after the crew decided to go-around some 300 m (980 ft) past a landing sign. The aircraft was flying low and engine power was sharply increased. The aircraft went into a steep climb, lost speed and crashed 600 m (2,000 ft) from the landing sign.
- On 5 November 1946, an Aeroflot-Lithuania Lisunov Li-2 crashed due to fuel exhaustion after repeated approach attempts while in a holding pattern.
- On 1 July 1947, an Aeroflot Ilyushin Il-12 crashed after the left engine failed on takeoff, causing a loss of airspeed.
- On 29 March 1951, an Aeroflot Ilyushin Il-12P crashed during which the right propeller struck the top of a radio tower.
- On 14 June 1957, an Ilyushin Il-14P operating as LOT Polish Airlines Flight 232 crashed after the crew did not follow instruction to use an instrument approach.
- On 4 November 1957, an Ilyushin Il-14P belonging to the Romanian Government crashed on approach in the fog. Grigore Preoteasa, who was the minister of foreign affairs at the time, was killed, as was the aircraft's crew.
- On 2 September 1959, an Ilyushin Il-18B suffered significant structural damage, forcing it to make an emergency landing. The aircraft was written off.
- On 23 October 1959, Aeroflot Flight 200 crashed in a forest on approach and was destroyed by fire, killing 28 of the 29 people aboard.
- On 26 August 1969, an Aeroflot Ilyushin Il-18B crashed after the crew forgot to lower the landing gear, killing 16 passengers.
- On 10 October 1971, Aeroflot Flight 773 crashed shortly after takeoff when an explosive device on board detonated, killing all 25 people aboard.
- On 3 January 1976, Aeroflot Flight 2003, a Tupolev Tu-124, crashed 7 kilometres (4.3 mi) west of Vnukovo Airport after both artificial horizons failed in IMC.
- On 17 March 1979, Aeroflot Flight 1691 crashed 1.5 kilometres (0.93 mi) away from the runway while attempting to return to the airport.
- On 2 June 1980, a Soviet Air Force Antonov An-22A suffered an in-flight fire and crashed short of the runway.
- On 16 January 2010, Utair Boeing 737-500 VQ-BAC departed the runway on landing and was substantially damaged when the nosewheel collapsed.
- On 29 December 2012, a Red Wings TU-204 overran the runway hitting the M3 highway. The aircraft burst into flames and broke into three pieces, with dashcam footage showing a car being hit by the debris. Five people were killed.
- On 20 October 2014, a Dassault Falcon 50 collided on take-off with a snow plow, killing all four people on board, including the CEO of Total S.A. oil and gas company Christophe de Margerie.
- In 2021, a 27-year-old man murdered a flight attendant at the airport. They were said to have arranged a rendezvous after a flight. He fled and was caught after a few days on the run.

== See also ==
- List of the busiest airports in Russia
- List of the busiest airports in Europe
- List of the busiest airports in the former USSR
