= Bugulma Airport =

Airport in Tatarstan, Russia

Bugulma Airport Бөгелмә Аэропорты
- IATA: UUA; ICAO: UWKB

Summary
- Airport type: Public
- Operator: JSC "Bugulma Air Enterprise"
- Serves: Bugulma
- Location: Bugulma, Russia
- Hub for: Ak Bars Aero
- Elevation AMSL: 991 ft / 302 m
- Coordinates: 54°38′24″N 52°48′6″E
- Website: bugavia.ru

Map
- Location of airport in Tatarstan

Runways
Direction	Length		Surface
Direction	ft	m	Surface
01/19	6,561	2,000	Asphalt

Bugulma Airport (Tatar: Бөгелмә Аэропорты; Russian: Аэропорт Бугульма) (IATA: UUA, ICAO: UWKB) is an airport in Tatarstan, Russia located 12 km north of Bugulma. It is a small airport with several hangars, servicing small prop transports. The 2000 m runway was constructed in 2000–2001. Foreign pilots need permission and a Russian Navigator, since Bugulma is a Russian language only airport.

Ak Bars Aero had its head office on the airport property.

== Airlines and destinations ==
As of November 2023 airport served following routes:

Airlines	Destinations
UVT Aero	Moscow-Vnukovo, Nizhnevartovsk, Novy Urengoy, Noyabrsk, Surgut, Usinsk

== See also ==
- List of airports in Russia
