= Grozny Avia =

Airline of Russia

Groznyy Avia
IATA	ICAO	Call sign
ZG	GOZ	GROZNYY AVIA
- Founded: 2007
- Ceased operations: 2016
- Hubs: Grozny Airport
- Fleet size: 6
- Destinations: 8
- Headquarters: Grozny, Russia
- Key people: H Turkaev (General Director)
- Website: grozny-avia.ru

JSC "Aircompany Grozny Avia" (ОАО "Авиакомпания Грозный Авиа"), operating as Grozny Avia (Russian: Грозный Авиа), was a Russian airline with its head office at Grozny Airport in Grozny, Russia. Its main base is Grozny Airport.

== History ==
The airline was formed on 17 August 2007 by Ramzan Kadyrov regional public fund on the order of the President of Chechnya. In 2014, a deal to acquire two Sukhoi Superjet 100 aircraft fell through due to cost.

== Fleet ==
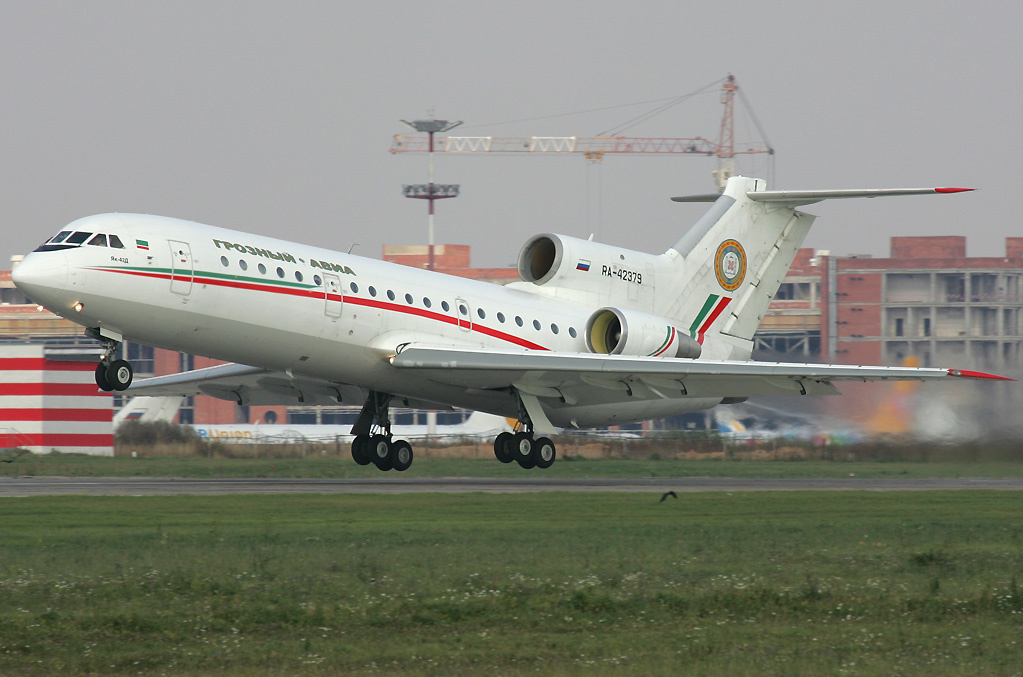
Grozny Avia Yakovlev Yak-42

The Groznyyavia fleet included the following aircraft as of 7 November 2012:

Aircraft type	Active	Notes
Yakovlev Yak-42	6	
