= Bugulma =

Town in the Republic of Tatarstan, Russia

Bugulma Бугульма
- Town

Other transcription(s)
  - Tatar: Бөгелмә
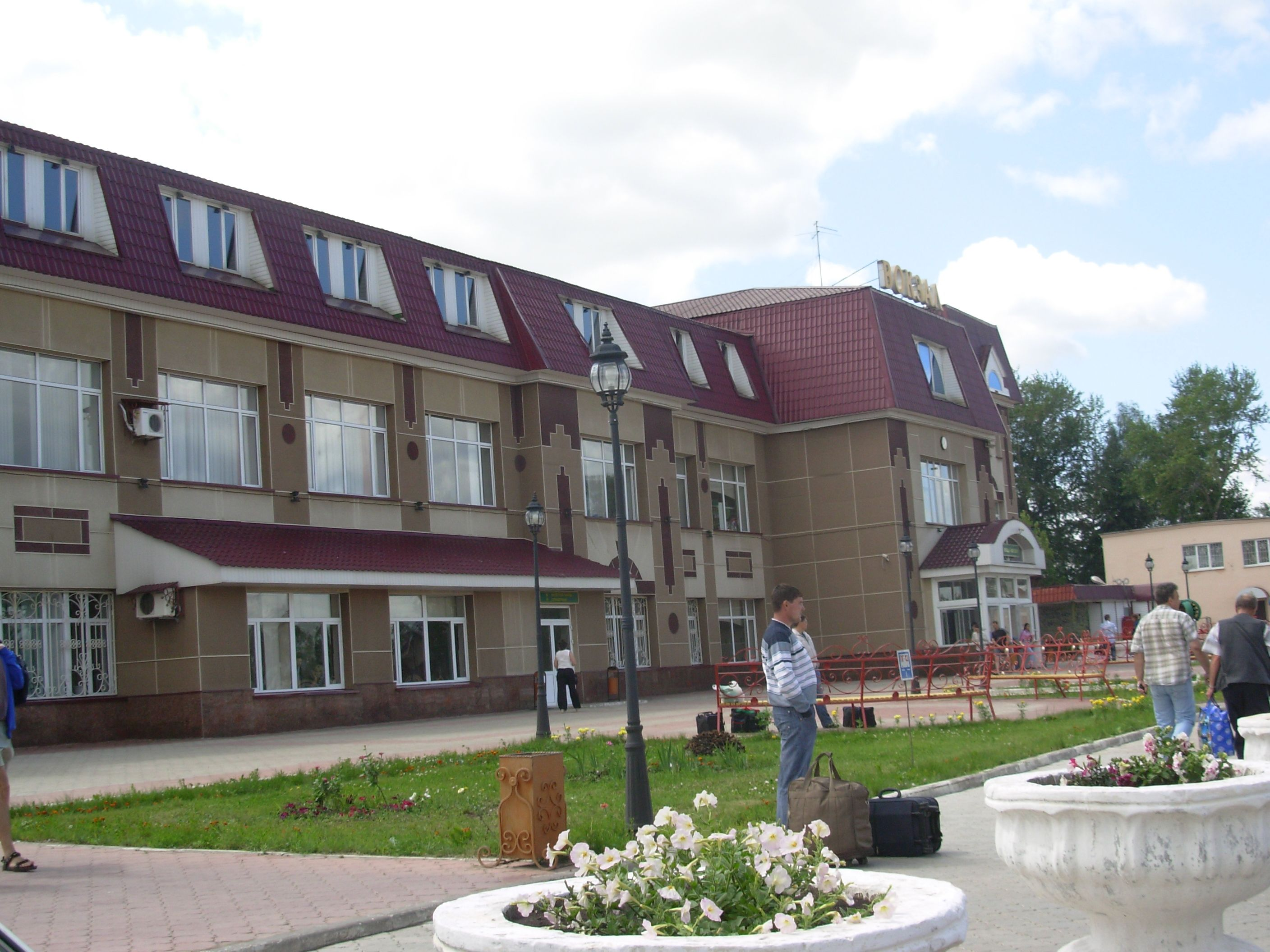
- Bugulma station building

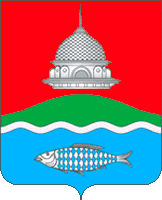
- Coat of arms
- Interactive map of Bugulma
- Location of Bugulma Bugulma (Tatarstan)
- Coordinates: 54°32′11″N 52°47′51″E
- Country: Russia
- Federal subject: Tatarstan
- Founded: 1736
- Town status since: 1781

Government
  - Body: City Council

Area
  - Total: 27.87 km^{2} (10.76 sq mi)
- Elevation: 315 m (1,033 ft)

Population (2010 Census)
  - Total: 89,204
  - Estimate (2025): 78,851 (−11.6%)
  - Rank: 188th in 2010
  - Density: 3,201/km^{2} (8,290/sq mi)

Administrative status
  - Subordinated to: town of republic significance of Bugulma
  - Capital of: town of republic significance of Bugulma, Bugulminsky District

Municipal status
  - Municipal district: Bugulminsky Municipal District
  - Urban settlement: Bugulma Urban Settlement
  - Capital of: Bugulminsky Municipal District, Bugulma Urban Settlement
- Time zone: UTC+3 (MSK)
- Postal codes: 423200,423230
- Dialing code: +7 85594
- OKTMO ID: 92617101001
- Website: bugulma.tatar.ru

Bugulma (Russian: Бугульма́; Tatar: Бөгелмә) is a town in the Republic of Tatarstan, Russia. Population: 89,204 (2010 census); 93,014 (2002 census); 89,589 (1989 Soviet census).

== Administrative and municipal status ==
Within the framework of administrative divisions, Bugulma serves as the administrative center of Bugulminsky District, even though it is not a part of it. As an administrative division, it is incorporated separately as the town of republic significance of Bugulma—an administrative unit with the status equal to that of the districts. As a municipal division, the town of republic significance of Bugulma is incorporated within Bugulminsky Municipal District as Bugulma Urban Settlement.

== Economy ==
Ak Bars Aero has its head office at Bugulma Airport.

== Notable people ==
Bugulma is the birthplace of noted Tatar singer Alsou.

Jaroslav Hasek in 1918 was the governor of the town Bugulma.
