= Nizhnevartovsk =

Nizhnevartovsk Нижневартовск
- City
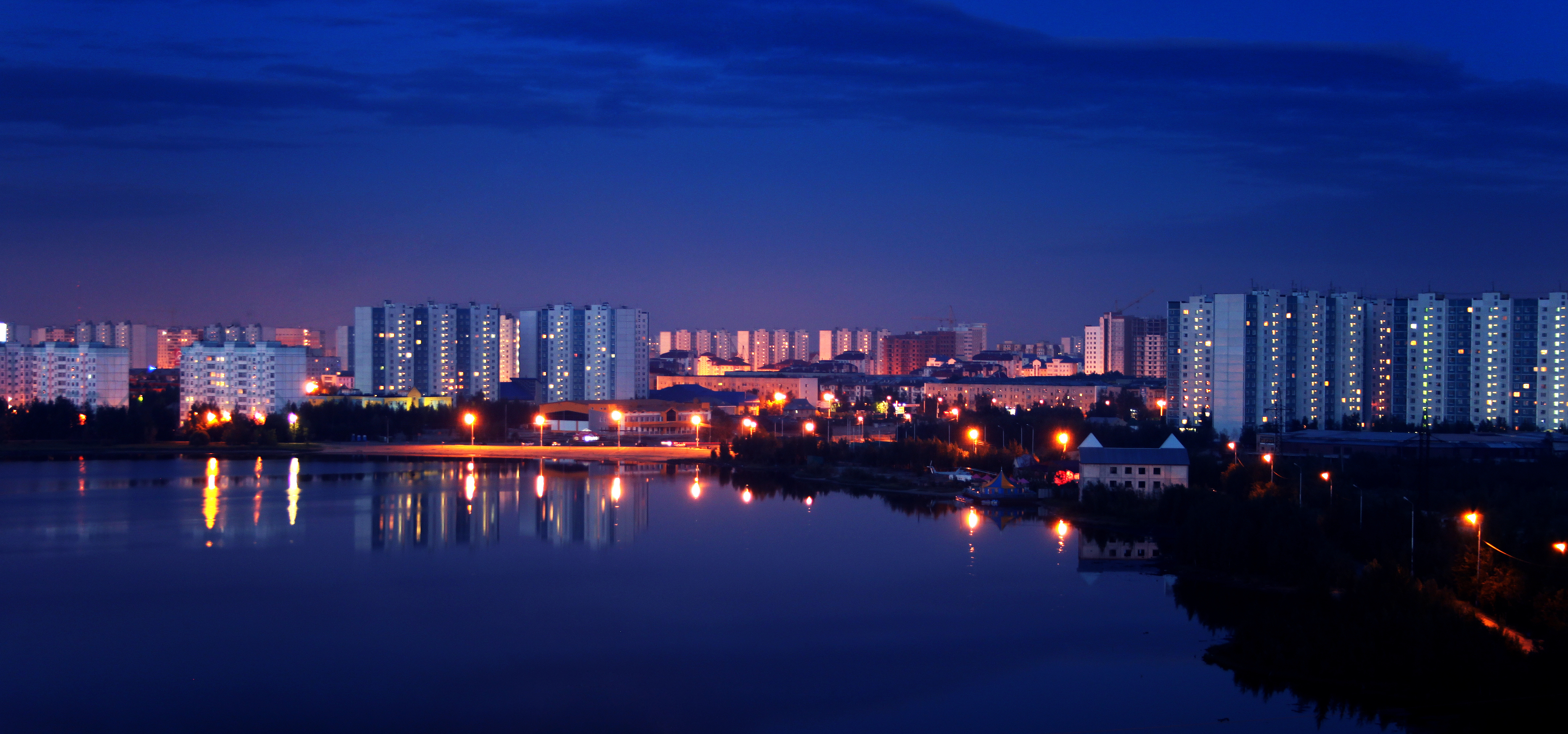
- Lake Komsomolskoye skyline

- Flag Coat of arms
- Interactive map of Nizhnevartovsk
- Location of Nizhnevartovsk Nizhnevartovsk (Khanty–Mansi Autonomous Okrug)
- Coordinates: 60°57′N 76°36′E
- Country: Russia
- Federal subject: Khanty-Mansi Autonomous Okrug
- Founded: 1909
- City status since: March 9, 1972

Government
  - Body: City Duma
  - Mayor: Dmitriy Koshenko

Area
  - Total: 271.319 km^{2} (104.757 sq mi)
- Elevation: 45 m (148 ft)

Population (2010 Census)
  - Total: 251,694
  - Estimate (2025): 293,130 (+16.5%)
  - Rank: 73rd in 2010
  - Density: 927.668/km^{2} (2,402.65/sq mi)

Administrative status
  - Subordinated to: city of okrug significance of Nizhnevartovsk
  - Capital of: Nizhnevartovsky District, city of okrug significance of Nizhnevartovsk

Municipal status
  - Urban okrug: Nizhnevartovsk Urban District
  - Capital of: Nizhnevartovsk Urban Okrug, Nizhnevartovsky Municipal District
- Time zone: UTC+5 (MSK+2)
- Postal code: 628600-628624
- Dialing code: +7 3466
- OKTMO ID: 71875000001
- City Day: March 9
- Website: www.n-vartovsk.ru

Nizhnevartovsk (Russian: Нижневартовск, IPA: [nʲɪʐnʲɪˈvartəfsk]) is the second-largest city in Khanty-Mansi Autonomous Okrug–Yugra, Russia. Since the 1960s, the Western Siberian oil boom has led to Nizhnevartovsk's rapid growth from a small settlement to a city due to its location beside the Samotlor oil field along the right bank of the Ob River, 30 kilometers (19 mi) from the border with Tomsk Oblast, and the presence of the petroleum industry has made it one of the wealthiest cities in Russia.

Nizhnevartovsk is one of the few cities in Russia that exceeds the population of the administrative center of its federal subject. Population: 283,256 (2021 census); 251,694 (2010 census); 239,044 (2002 census); 241,457 (1989 Soviet census).

Historical population
Year	Pop.	±%
1959	2,300	—
1970	15,663	+581.0%
1979	108,740	+594.2%
1989	241,457	+122.0%
2002	239,044	−1.0%
2010	251,694	+5.3%
2021	283,256	+12.5%
Source: Census data

== Etymology ==
The name Nizhnevartovsk comes from a section of the Ob river bank suitable for building a pier, which was called Vartovsky Yar (Вартовский Яр) (Note: Historically, yar (яр) referred to a concave, steep riverbank.). This name, in turn, came from the Vartovskiye (Note: A family name of the inhabitants circa 1780.) yurts of the Khanty people, known since the second half of the 18th century. The prefix "Нижне-" 'Nizhne-', lit. 'Lower' was used because 180 versts (Note: 180 versts ≈ 192 km ≈ 119 miles) upstream along the Ob there was another yar with the same name near the river Vartovskaya. To distinguish it from thе upper pier, the new one was named Nizhne-Vartovskaya (Нижне-Вартовская), and later this name was passed on to the settlement founded beside it.

== Physical and geographical characteristics ==
=== Geographical location ===
Nizhnevartovsk is located in the Sredneobskaya lowland of the West Siberian plain in the middle reaches of the Ob river on its right Bank.

Nizhnevartovsk, like the entire district, is located in the Moscow time zone+2 (Yekaterinburg time). The offset of the applied time relative to UTC is +5:00

=== Hydrology ===
The main watercourse of the city is the Ob river, from the mouth of the Svitlaya Bayou to the Lokosovskaya Bayou. Within the Nizhnevartovsky district, the section of the middle Ob river is 134 km long and the floodplain is 18 to 20 km wide. By the nature of the water regime, it belongs to the type of rivers with spring and summer floods and floods in the warm period of the year. The duration of the flood is on average 60–130 days. The appearance of ice formations on rivers is typical for the second half of October—early November. The average duration of ice build-up is 180–200 days.

In hydrographic terms, the taiga zone of the Ob river differs sharply from the forest-steppe zone adjacent to it from the South; this difference is primarily due to a change in the ratio of water balance elements. With a noticeable increase in precipitation, with a decrease in their losses to evaporation, surface runoff increases sharply here.

In 2015, the largest flooding of territories adjacent to Nizhnevartovsk in thirty years occurred, including numerous dachas and gardening associations. The reason for the dynamics of water level rise was the climatic features of the spring period.

=== Climate ===
Nizhnevartovsk has a subarctic climate (Koppen Dfc). The climate is characterized by a long cold winter, long snow cover (200–210 days), short transitional seasons, late spring and early autumn frosts, short frost-free period (100–110 days), and short, but relatively warm summer (10–14 weeks). Winter is characterized by relatively small inter-day variability in air temperature, the average value of which is 5°C; which is lower than during the summer.

The annual precipitation rate is of the continental type. During the cold period, about 20% of the annual amount falls. Most of them fall in the first months of winter. The maximum annual precipitation falls in the summer months of the year — from June to August. In some years, the amount of precipitation may deviate significantly from the norm. The annual minimum precipitation is observed in February. Snow cover is formed in October—early November, and its descent is observed in late April-early May.

As the entire district is equated to the regions of the Far North.

- Average annual air temperature: −0.9°C
- Relative humidity: 73.7%
- Average wind speed: 3.1m/s

=== Vegetation ===
In the Nizhnevartovsky district, as well as throughout the entire territory of the Middle Ob region, cedar (people in Russia called "cedar" some species of pine, in this case – Siberian pine) forests are indigenous, and birch and aspen trees that have arisen in their place are derived. The basis of the district's forests is made up of three species: pine, cedar and birch. Among the forest formations, the area is dominated by pine trees. Cedar forests cover less than a quarter of the forested area. A third of the area is occupied by small-leaved forests.

Pine trees are found on sandy and sandy loam strongly podzolic soils and are confined to elevated terrain areas. The most common types are lichen and cranberry pines.

For cedar trees, a good development of the grass-shrub layer is characteristic, in which the dominant value belongs to forest shrubs (blueberries, cranberries, watermelons, marsh bagulnik) and taiga smallgrass (Linnea Severnaya, kislitsa, maynik dvulistnogo). Shrubs are represented by Siberian mountain ash, individual specimens. Green mosses are always present in these forests.

== History ==
Nizhnevartovsk was founded in 1909 (or 1905), built as a service point for merchant steamships operating on the Ob River to acquire stocks of firewood to power their boats. The new village had five homes with a population of eleven people, and was named Nizhnevartovskoye (Нижневартовское), in reference to the Vartovskaya River, a tributary of the Ob located 180 versts (190 km; 120 mi) downstream. In early 1924, Nizhnevartovsky Selsoviet was formed.

Nizhnevartovsk remained a relatively small settlement until the 1960s when the Soviet authorities began widespread prospecting for the petroleum industry in the Western Siberia region, discovering the Samotlor oil field, one of the largest oil fields in the world, beneath the nearby Lake Samoltor to the north of Nizhnevartovsk. The discovery saw its rapid development and growth from a large village to a boomtown, Komsomol volunteers were brought in from across the country to construct the city, and Nizhnevartovsk's population skyrocketed from 2300 people in 1959 to 15,663 in 1970. Town status was granted to Nizhnevartovsk on March 9, 1972.

== Administrative and municipal divisions ==
Within the framework of administrative divisions, Nizhnevartovsk serves as the administrative center of Nizhnevartovsky District, even though it is not a part of it. As an administrative division, it is incorporated separately as the city of okrug significance of Nizhnevartovsk—an administrative unit with the status equal to that of the districts. As a municipal division, the city of okrug significance of Nizhnevartovsk is incorporated as Nizhnevartovsk Urban Okrug.

== Economy ==
Nizhnevartovsk is the center of the West Siberian oil-producing region and one of the wealthiest cities in the country.

== Education ==
Nizhnevartovsk is home to Nizhnevartovsk State University, a higher education institution with over 5,000 students.

== Notable people ==
- Ksenia Sukhinova (born 1987), Miss World 2008

== In popular culture ==
Nizhnevartovsk features prominently in the opening of Tom Clancy's novel Red Storm Rising, which details a hypothetical war between NATO and the Warsaw Pact. In the novel, Nizhnevartovsk is depicted as a significant center for petroleum in the Soviet Union until it is sabotaged, causing a major economic crisis which triggers World War III.

== Gallery ==
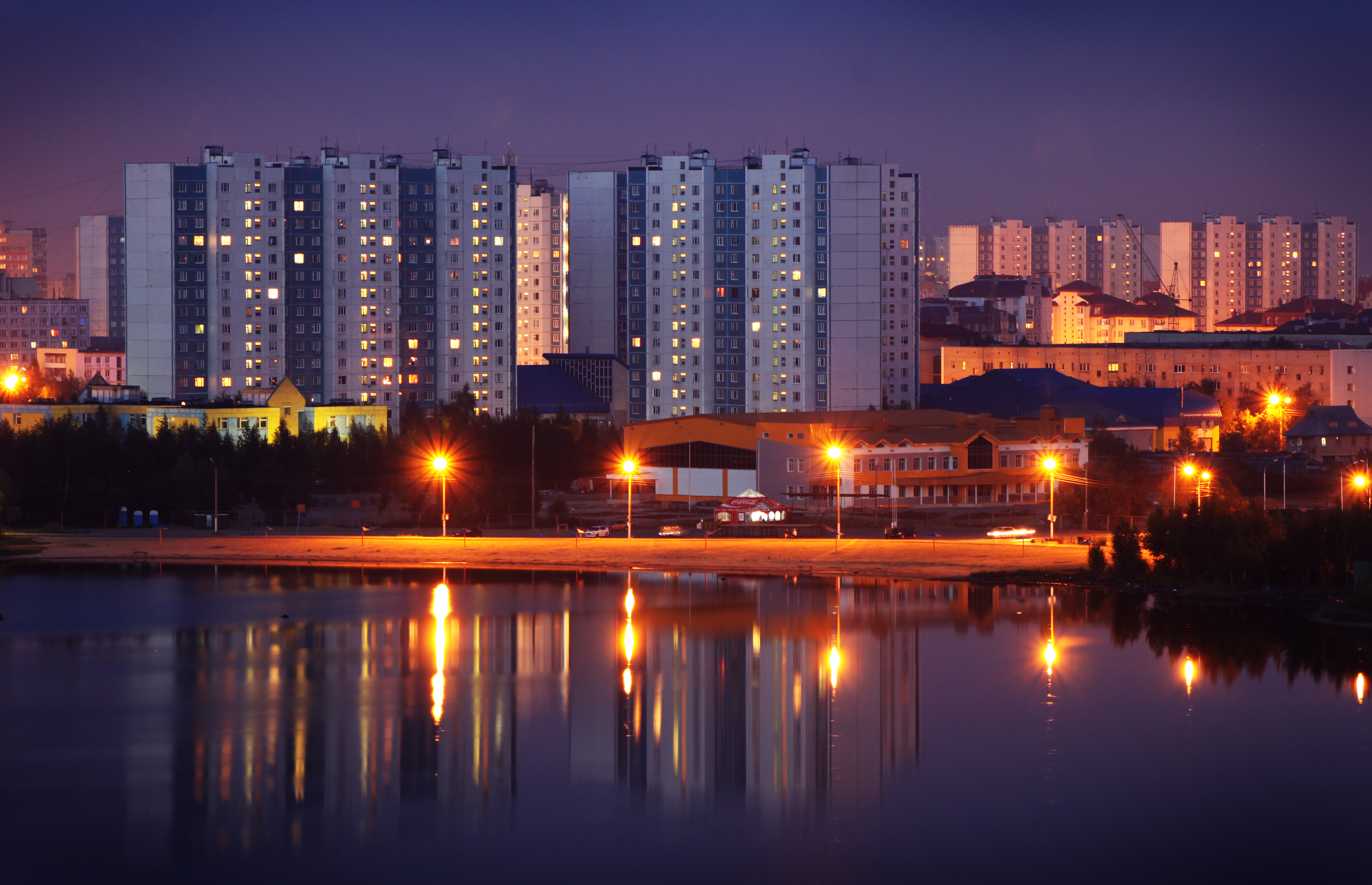
Buildings near Lake Komsomolskoye in Nizhnevartovsk

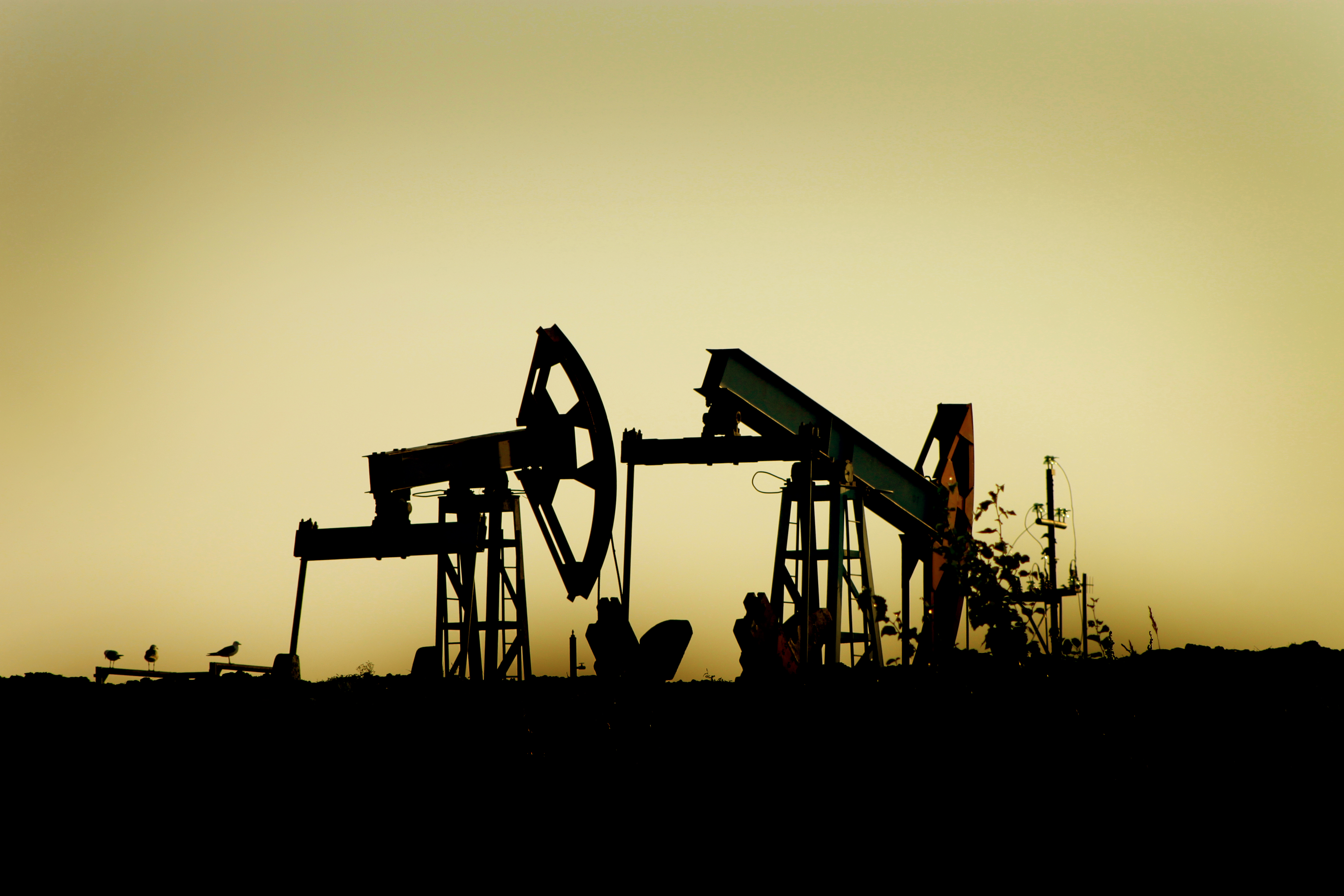
The pumpjacks near Lake Kymylemtor

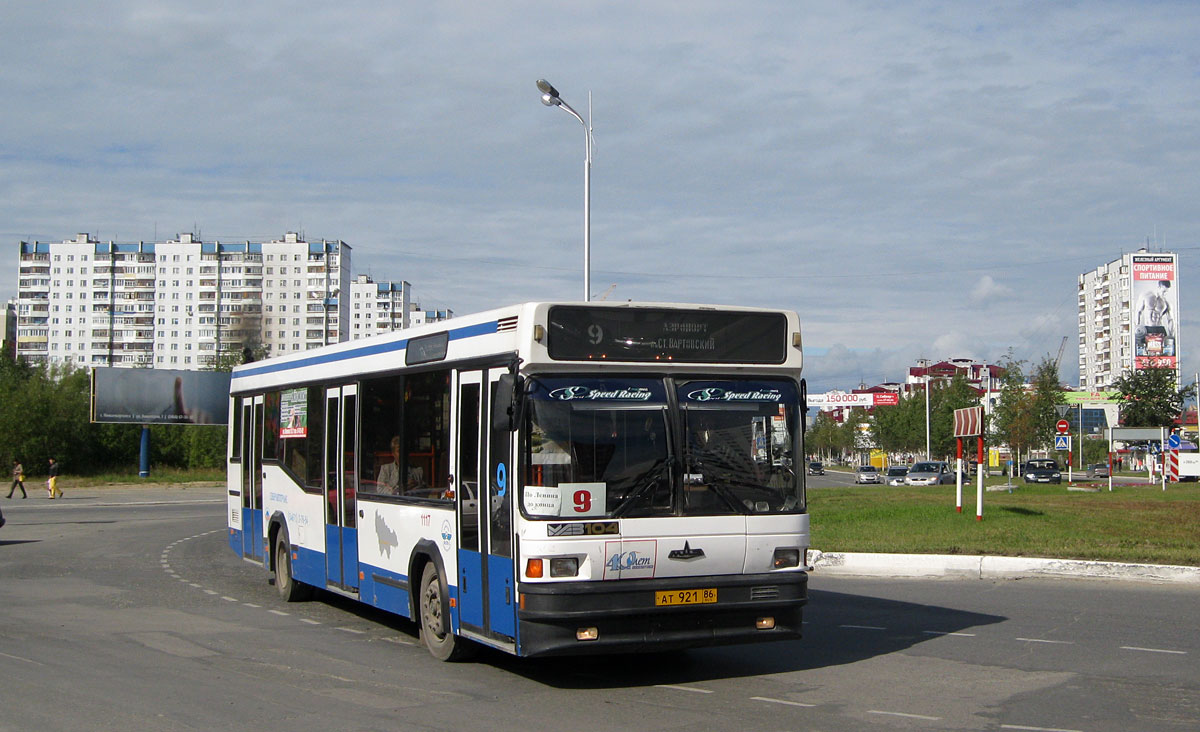
MAZ-104 bus in Nizhnevartovsk

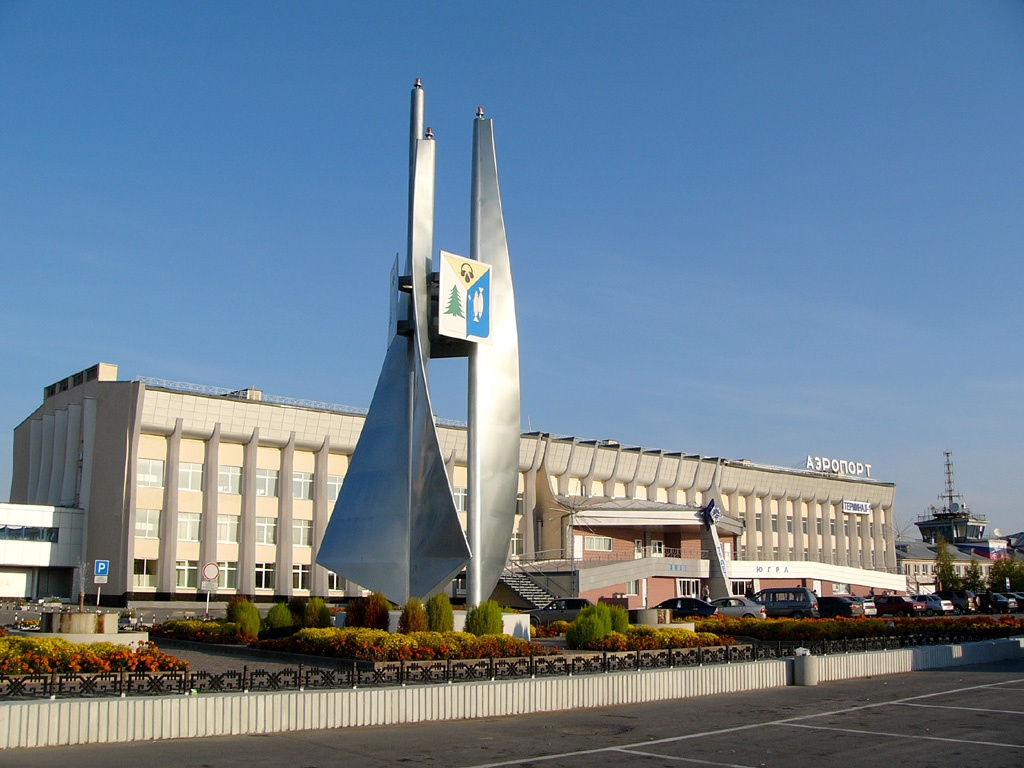
Nizhnevartovsk Airport
