= Nizhnevartovsk Airport =

Airport in Nizhnevartovsk, Russia

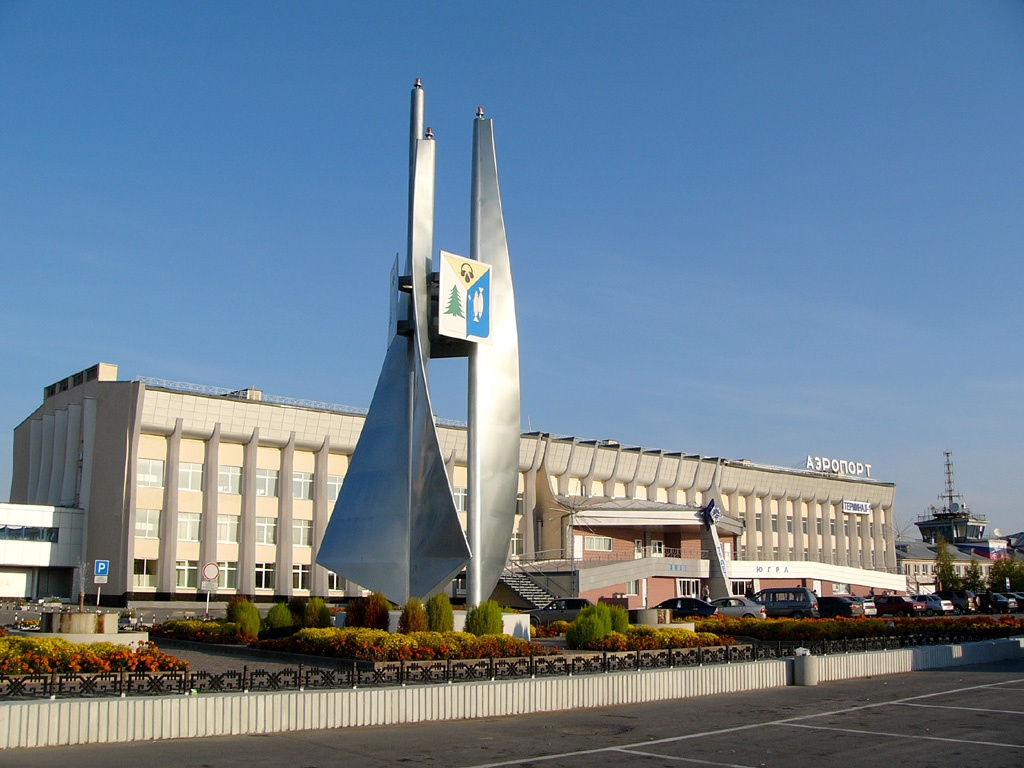
- IATA: NJC; ICAO: USNN

Summary
- Airport type: Public
- Operator: Nizhnevartovskavia
- Serves: Nizhnevartovsk
- Location: Nizhnevartovsk, Russia
- Elevation AMSL: 177 ft / 54 m
- Coordinates: 60°57′0″N 76°29′0″E
- Website: nv-aero.ru

Map
- Location of airport in Khanty-Mansi NJC (Russia)

Runways
Direction	Length		Surface
Direction	ft	m	Surface
03/21	10,499	3,200	Asphalt

Statistics (2018)
- Passengers: 652,129
- Sources: Russian Federal Air Transport Agency (see also provisional 2018 statistics)

Nizhnevartovsk Airport (Russian: Аэропорт Нижневартовск) (IATA: NJC, ICAO: USNN) is a major airport in Russia located 4 km northwest of Nizhnevartovsk. It is a large civilian airport with an asphalt runway, handling some widebody aircraft. The airport is a key element of the region's gas production region.

== Airlines and destinations ==
Airlines	Destinations
Aeroflot	Moscow–Sheremetyevo, Saint Petersburg
azimuth	Mineralnye Vody
IrAero	Baku
KrasAvia	Krasnoyarsk–International
Nordwind Airlines	Seasonal: Sochi
Pobeda	Moscow-Vnukovo
Red Wings Airlines	Chelyabinsk, Makhachkala, Yekaterinburg
RusLine	Tomsk, Yekaterinburg
S7 Airlines	Novosibirsk
Ural Airlines	Osh, Tashkent
Utair	Khanty-Mansiysk, Nyagan, Omsk, Tyumen, Ufa, Yekaterinburg; Seasonal: Sochi
UVT Aero	Bugulma, Cheboksary, Kazan, Perm
Uzbekistan Airways	Namangan, Tashkent

== See also ==
- List of airports in Russia
