= List of Azimuth destinations =

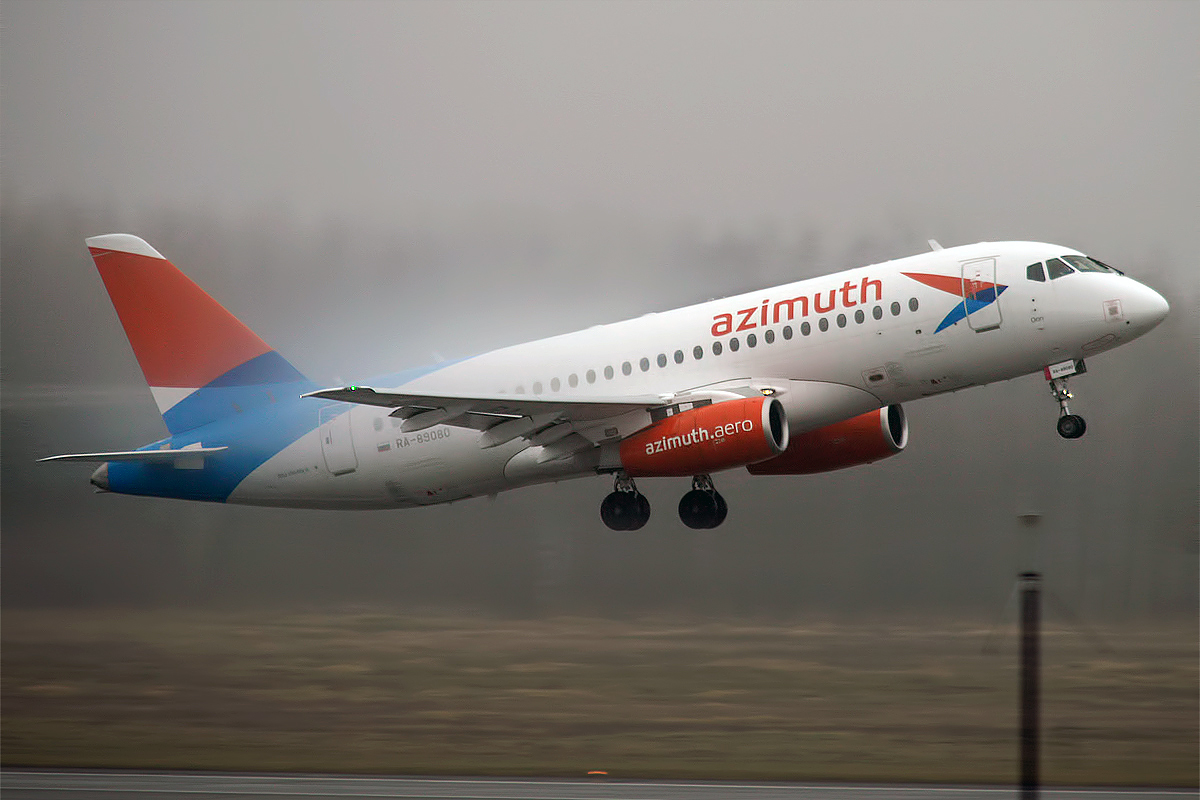
Azimuth Sukhoi Superjet 100 taking off at Pulkovo Airport

As of January 2026, Azimuth Airlines operates flights to 28 domestic destinations and 16 international destinations in Eurasian countries.

== Destinations ==
Country	City	Airport	Notes	Ref
Armenia	Yerevan	Zvartnots International Airport		
Azerbaijan	Baku	Heydar Aliyev International Airport		
Azerbaijan	Ganja	Ganja International Airport	Terminated	
Belarus	Minsk	Minsk National Airport		
Egypt	Hurghada	Hurghada International Airport	Terminated	
Egypt	Sharm El Sheikh	Sharm El Sheikh International Airport		
Germany	Munich	Munich Airport	Terminated	
Georgia	Batumi	Alexander Kartveli Batumi International Airport		
Georgia	Kutaisi	David the Builder Kutaisi International Airport		
Georgia	Tbilisi	Shota Rustaveli Tbilisi International Airport		
Israel	Tel Aviv	David Ben Gurion International Airport		
Kazakhstan	Almaty	Almaty International Airport		
Kazakhstan	Aqtau	Aqtau International Airport	Terminated	
Kazakhstan	Atyrau	Atyrau Airport		
Kyrgyzstan	Bishkek	Manas International Airport	Terminated	
Russia	Apatity	Apatity Airport		
Russia	Arkhangelsk	Talagi Airport	Terminated	
Russia	Astrakhan	Narimanovo Airport		
Russia	Bryansk	Bryansk International Airport	Terminated	
Russia	Cheboksary	Cheboksary International Airport		
Russia	Chelyabinsk	Balandino Airport		
Russia	Elista	Elista Airport	Terminated	
Russia	Grozny	Grozny Airport	Terminated	
Russia	Ivanovo	Ivanovo Yuzhny Airport		
Russia	Izhevsk	Izhevsk Airport	Terminated	
Russia	Kazan	Kazan International Airport	Terminated	
Russia	Kaliningrad	Khrabrovo Airport		
Russia	Kaluga	Kaluga (Grabtsevo) Airport	Suspended until 23 March 2027	
Russia	Kemerovo	Alexei Leonov Kemerovo International Airport	Terminated	
Russia	Kirov	Pobedilovo Airport		
Russia	Krasnodar	Pashkovsky Airport		
Russia	Krasnoyarsk	Krasnoyarsk International Airport		
Russia	Magas / Nazran	Magas Airport	Terminated	
Russia	Magnitogorsk	Magnitogorsk International Airport		
Russia	Makhachkala	Uytash Airport		
Russia	Mineralnye Vody	Mineralnye Vody Airport	Hub	
Russia	Moscow	Vnukovo International Airport	Hub	
Russia	Murmansk	Emperor Nicholas II Murmansk Airport	Terminated	
Russia	Nalchik	Nalchik Airport	Terminated	
Russia	Nizhnekamsk	Begishevo Airport	Terminated	
Russia	Nizhny Novgorod	Strigino International Airport	Terminated	
Russia	Novosibirsk	Tolmachevo Airport	Terminated	
Russia	Omsk	Omsk Tsentralny Airport		
Russia	Orenburg	Orenburg Tsentralny Airport		
Russia	Penza	Penza Vissarion Belinsky Airport		
Russia	Perm	Bolshoye Savino Airport		
Russia	Petrozavodsk	Besovets Airport	Terminated	
Russia	Pskov	Princess Olga Pskov International Airport		
Russia	Rostov-on-Don	Platov International Airport	Terminated	
Russia	Saint Petersburg	Pulkovo Airport		
Russia	Samara	Kurumoch International Airport		
Russia	Saransk	Saransk Airport		
Russia	Saratov	Saratov Gagarin Airport	Terminated	
Russia	Sochi	Adler-Sochi International Airport	Focus city	
Russia	Stavropol	Stavropol Shpakovskoye Airport		
Russia	Surgut	Farman Salmanov Surgut Airport		
Russia	Tyumen	Roshchino International Airport		
Russia	Ufa	Ufa International Airport	Focus city	
Russia	Ulyanovsk	Ulyanovsk Baratayevka Airport		
Russia	Vladikavkaz	Beslan Airport	Terminated	
Russia	Volgograd	Gumrak Airport	Terminated	
Russia	Yaroslavl	Golden Ring Yaroslavl International Airport		
Russia	Yekaterinburg	Koltsovo International Airport	Terminated	
Saudi Arabia	Jeddah	King Abdulaziz International Airport		
Saudi Arabia	Riyadh	King Khalid International Airport		
Saudi Arabia	Tabuk	Prince Sultan bin Abdulaziz Airport		
Turkey	Antalya	Antalya Airport		
Turkey	Bodrum	Milas-Bodrum Airport	Seasonal	
Turkey	Istanbul	Istanbul Airport		
Ukraine / Russia (Defacto)	Simferopol	Simferopol International Airport	Terminated	
United Arab Emirates	Dubai	Dubai International Airport	Terminated	
United Arab Emirates	Dubai	Al Maktoum International Airport		
Uzbekistan	Bukhara	Bukhara International Airport		
Uzbekistan	Navoi	Navoi International Airport		
Uzbekistan	Samarqand	Samarqand International Airport		
Uzbekistan	Tashkent	Islam Karimov Tashkent International Airport		
Uzbekistan	Termez	Termez Airport		
Uzbekistan	Urgench	Urgench Airport		
