= Royal Flight (airline) =

Charter airline based in Abakan, Russia

IATA	ICAO	Call sign
RL	ABG	ROYAL FLIGHT
- Founded: 1992 (as Abakan-Avia); 11 July 2014 (as Royal Flight)
- Ceased operations: May 2022
- Operating bases: Moscow-Domodedovo; Moscow-Sheremetyevo; St. Petersburg; Yekaterinburg
- Fleet size: 11
- Destinations: 66
- Parent company: Coral Travel
- Headquarters: Abakan, Khakassia, Russia
- Employees: 76 (2007)
- Website: www.royalflight.ru/en/

Joint stock company Royal Flight Airlines (Russian: АО «Авиакомпания «Роял Флайт»), formerly Abakan-Avia (Russian: ЗАО «Авиакомпания «Абакан-Авиа»), was a charter airline based in Abakan, Republic of Khakassia, Russia. It operated charter services between Russian cities and various holiday destinations in Asia, Europe, the Middle East, Africa, and the Caribbean. Its main base was the Abakan Airport (ABA).

== History ==
The airline was established in 1992 as Abakan-Avia and started operations in 1993. It was established from a former Aeroflot unit, and started domestic cargo flights in 1993 and international flights in 1994. Sobol acquired a 70% share in 1999. It had 76 employees (at March 2007). In 2002, a proposed merger with RusAir failed. In July 2014, it was purchased by Russian tour operator Coral Travel and renamed Royal Flight Airlines on 11 July 2014.

In May 2022, Royal Flight ceased all operations.

== Destinations ==
Logo of Abakan-Avia

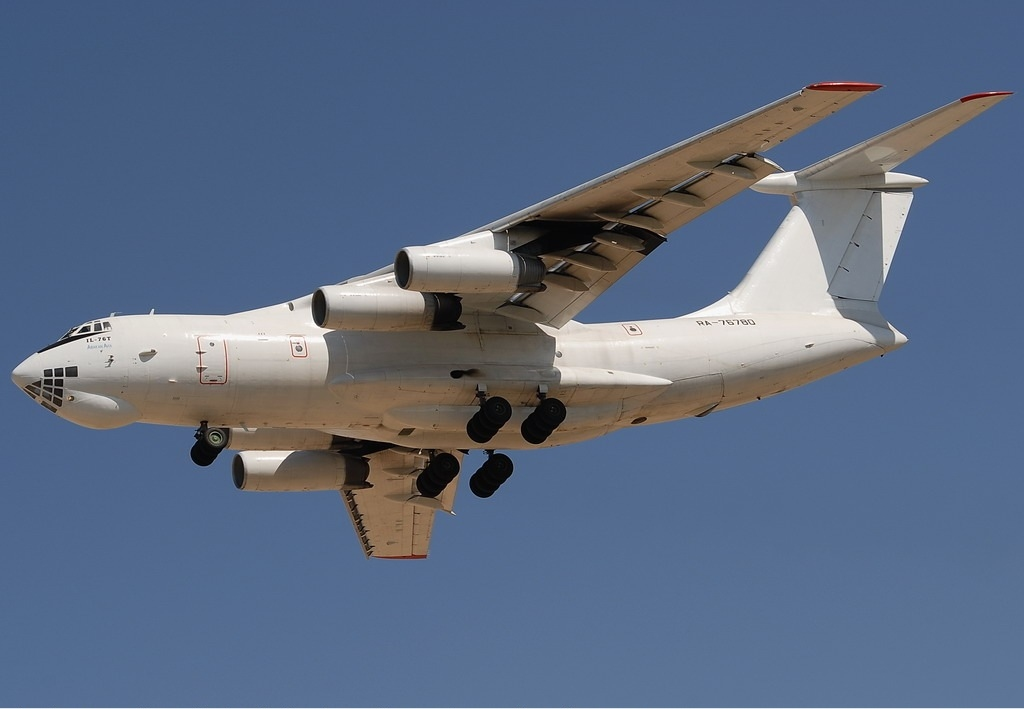
A former Abakan-Avia Ilyushin IL-76T.

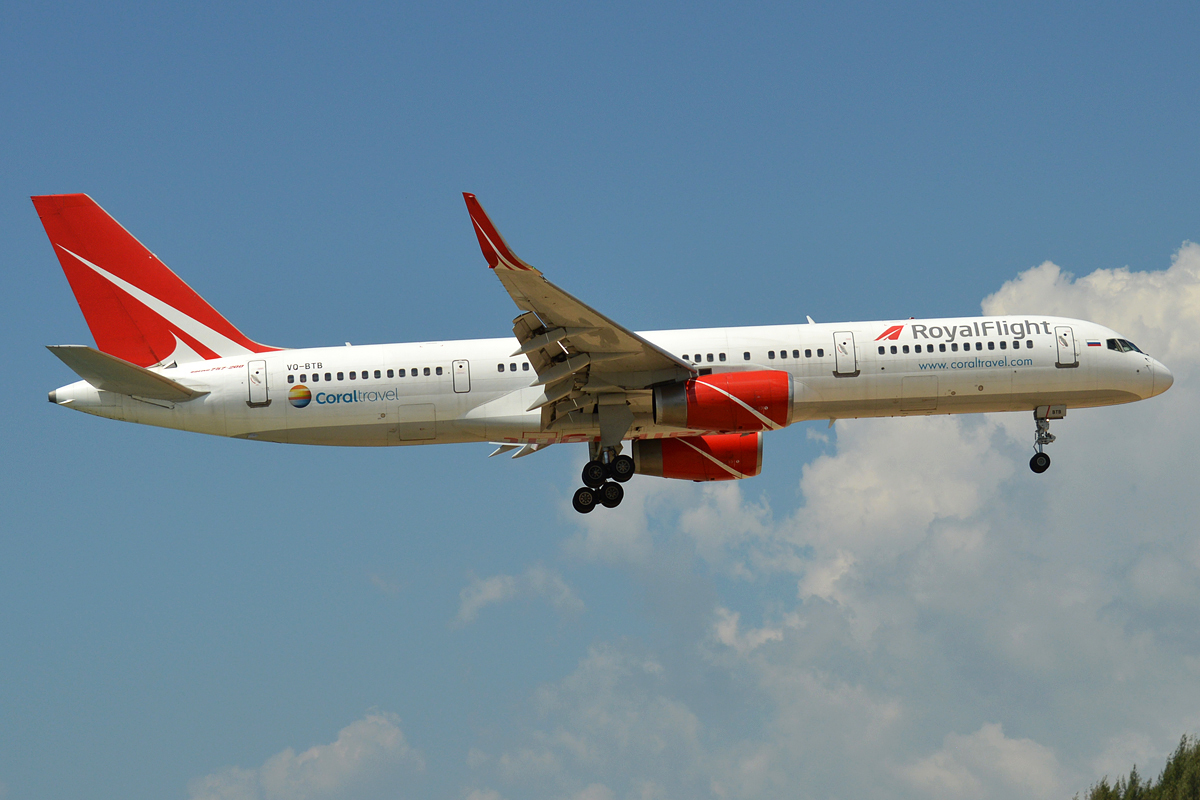
Royal Flight Boeing 757-200

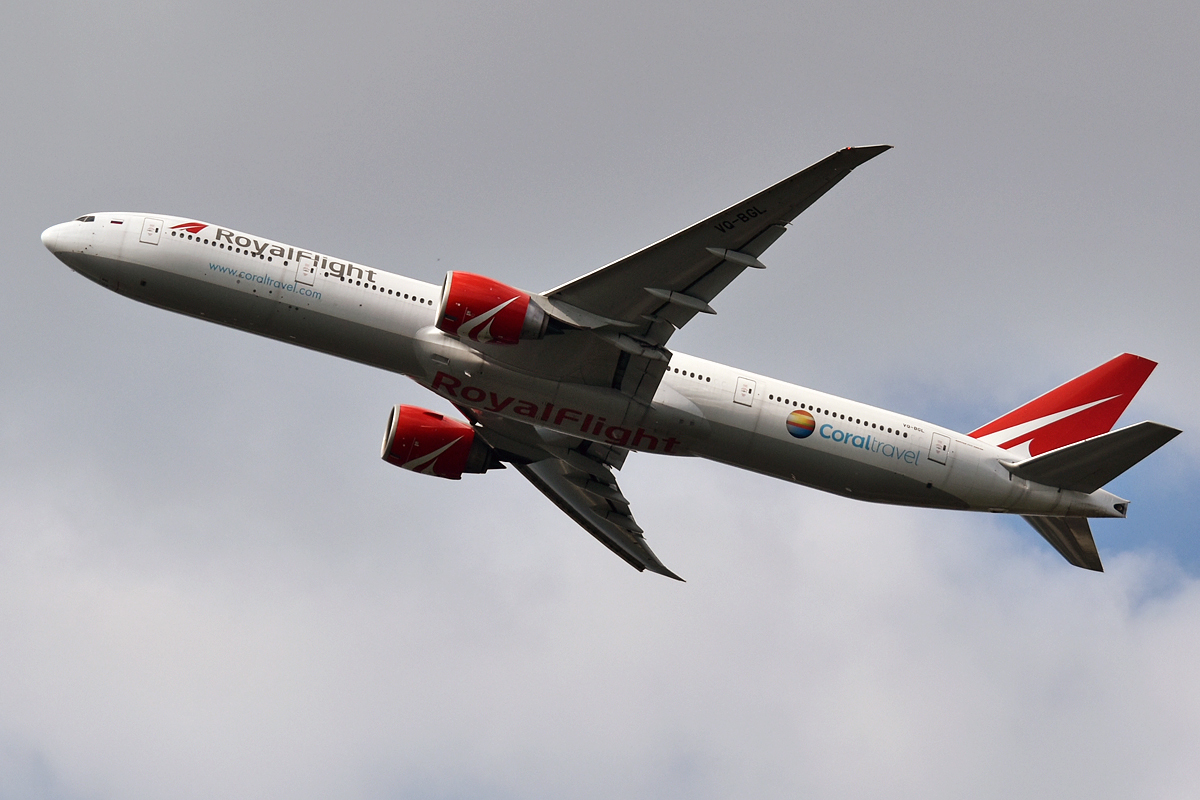
Royal Flight Boeing 777-300ER

By July 2019, Royal Flight operated to the following destinations:

Country/region	City	Airport	Notes	Ref.
Bulgaria	Burgas	Burgas Airport	Terminated	
Taiwan	Taipei	Taoyuan International Airport	Seasonal charter	
Hong Kong	Hong Kong	Hong Kong International Airport	Cargo	
China	Chongqing	Chongqing Jiangbei International Airport	Seasonal charter	
China	Guiyang	Guiyang Longdongbao International Airport	Seasonal charter	
China	Hefei	Hefei Xinqiao International Airport	Seasonal charter	
China	Nanning	Nanning Wuxu International Airport	Seasonal charter	
China	Ningbo	Ningbo Lishe International Airport	Seasonal charter	
China	Macau	Macau International Airport	Seasonal charter	
Cuba	Varadero	Juan Gualberto Gómez Airport	Seasonal charter	
Cuba	Holguín	Frank País Airport	Seasonal charter	
Cyprus	Larnaca	Larnaca International Airport	Terminated	
Dominican Republic	Punta Cana	Punta Cana International Airport	Seasonal charter	
Greece	Corfu	Corfu International Airport	Terminated	
Greece	Kos	Kos International Airport	Terminated	
Greece	Rhodes	Rhodes International Airport	Terminated	
India	Goa	Dabolim Airport	Seasonal charter	
Italy	Bari	Bari Karol Wojtyła Airport	Seasonal charter	
Italy	Catania	Catania–Fontanarossa Airport	Seasonal charter	
Italy	Naples	Naples International Airport	Seasonal charter	
Mexico	Cancún	Cancún International Airport	Seasonal charter	
Montenegro	Tivat	Tivat Airport	Seasonal charter	
Morocco	Agadir	Agadir–Al Massira Airport	Seasonal charter	
Russia	Abakan	Abakan International Airport	Seasonal charter	
Russia	Arkhangelsk	Talagi Airport	Seasonal charter	
Russia	Barnaul	Barnaul Airport	Seasonal charter	
Russia	Belgorod	Belgorod International Airport	Seasonal charter	
Russia	Bryansk	Bryansk International Airport	Seasonal charter	
Russia	Irkutsk	Irkutsk International Airport	Seasonal charter	
Russia	Kaliningrad	Khrabrovo Airport	Seasonal charter	
Russia	Kaluga	Kaluga (Grabtsevo) Airport	Seasonal charter	
Russia	Kazan	Kazan International Airport	Seasonal charter	
Russia	Kemerovo	Kemerovo International Airport	Seasonal charter	
Russia	Khanty-Mansiysk	Khanty-Mansiysk Airport	Seasonal charter	
Russia	Krasnodar	Krasnodar International Airport	Seasonal charter	
Russia	Mineralnye Vody	Mineralnye Vody Airport	Seasonal charter	
Russia	Moscow	Moscow Domodedovo Airport	Base	
Russia	Moscow	Sheremetyevo International Airport	Base	
Russia	Nizhnevartovsk	Nizhnevartovsk Airport	Seasonal charter	
Russia	Nizhny Novgorod	Strigino International Airport	Seasonal charter	
Russia	Novokuznetsk	Spichenkovo Airport	Seasonal charter	
Russia	Novosibirsk	Tolmachevo Airport	Seasonal charter	
Russia	Omsk	Omsk Tsentralny Airport	Seasonal charter	
Russia	Orenburg	Orenburg Tsentralny Airport	Seasonal charter	
Russia	Perm	Perm International Airport	Seasonal charter	
Russia	Rostov-on-Don	Platov International Airport	Seasonal charter	
Russia	Saint Petersburg	Pulkovo Airport	Base	
Russia	Samara	Kurumoch International Airport	Seasonal charter	
Russia	Saratov	Saratov Gagarin Airport	Seasonal charter	
Russia	Sochi	Sochi International Airport	Seasonal charter	
Russia	Surgut	Surgut International Airport	Seasonal charter	
Russia	Tomsk	Bogashevo Airport	Seasonal charter	
Russia	Tyumen	Roshchino International Airport	Seasonal charter	
Russia	Ufa	Ufa International Airport	Seasonal charter	
Russia	Ulyanovsk	Ulyanovsk Vostochny Airport	Seasonal charter	
Russia	Vladivostok	Vladivostok International Airport	Seasonal charter	
Russia	Volgograd	Volgograd International Airport	Seasonal charter	
Russia	Yekaterinburg	Koltsovo International Airport	Base	
Spain	Barcelona	Barcelona–El Prat Airport	Terminated	
Spain	Palma de Mallorca	Palma de Mallorca Airport	Terminated	
Spain	Reus	Reus Airport	Terminated	
Sri Lanka	Colombo	Bandaranaike International Airport	Seasonal charter	
Thailand	Krabi	Krabi International Airport	Seasonal charter	
Thailand	Pattaya	U-Tapao International Airport	Seasonal charter	
Thailand	Phuket	Phuket International Airport	Seasonal charter	
Tunisia	Djerba	Djerba–Zarzis International Airport	Seasonal charter	
Tunisia	Enfidha	Enfidha–Hammamet International Airport	Seasonal charter	
Turkey	Alanya	Gazipaşa Airport	Seasonal charter	
Turkey	Antalya	Antalya Airport	Seasonal charter	
Turkey	Bodrum	Milas–Bodrum Airport	Seasonal charter	
Turkey	Dalaman	Dalaman Airport	Seasonal charter	
Vietnam	Nha Trang	Cam Ranh International Airport	Seasonal charter	
Vietnam	Phu Quoc	Phu Quoc International Airport	Seasonal charter	
United Arab Emirates	Dubai	Al Maktoum International Airport	Seasonal charter	

== Fleet ==
As of March 2022, the Royal Flight fleet consisted of the following aircraft:

Royal Flight fleet
Aircraft	In service	Orders	Passengers			Notes
Aircraft	In service	Orders	C	Y	Total	Notes
Boeing 737-800	1	—	—	189	189	
Boeing 757-200	1	—	—	235	235	Stored at Václav Havel Airport Prague due to the 2022 Russian invasion of Ukraine.
Boeing 767-300ER	2	—	—	325	325	
Boeing 767-300ER	2	—	—	330	330	
Boeing 777-300ER	2	—	14	478	492	
Total	11	—				

== See also ==
- List of defunct airlines of Russia

== Bibliography ==
- Günter Endres, ed. (2010). Flight International World Airlines 2010. Sutton, Surrey, England: Reed Business Information. ISBN 978-1-898779-39-1.
