= Fyodorovka Airport =

Omsk-Fyodorovka Airport Аэропорт Омск-Фёдоровка
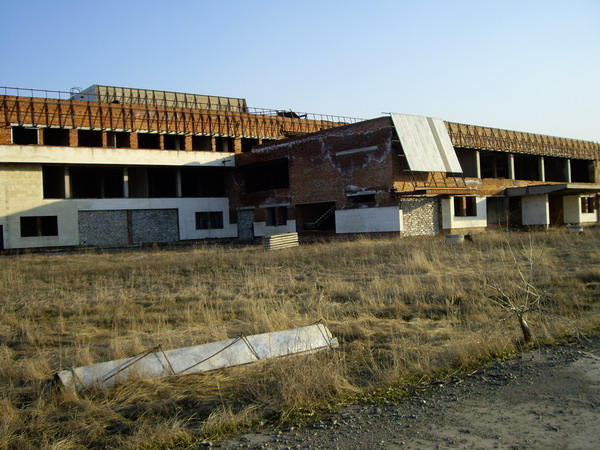
- Building in April 2007; View from a runway
- IATA: —; ICAO: UNOF

Summary
- Airport type: Public
- Operator: not decided yet Currently between Novaport and Airports of Regions
- Location: Omsk, Russia
- Elevation AMSL: 1,366 m (4,482 ft)
- Coordinates: 55°5′N 73°0.2668′E

Map
- Omsk, Omsk Oblast

Runways
| Direction | Length | | Surface |
| Direction | m | ft | Surface |
|---|---|---|---|
| 06/24 | 2,900 x 45 (width) | 11,811 | Concrete |

Fyodorovka Airport (Russian: аэропорт Омск-Фёдоровка) is an abandoned airport, located in the North-Western part of Omsk, Russia. The airport was initially planned to be opened in 2016, as one of the gifts to Omsk's jubilee of 300 years.

== History ==
The airport was initially decided to be built outside the boundaries of Omsk in 1979. The construction of the facility was constantly discontinued and resumed in 1996, 2001, 2005 and 2008. Years later it was planned to be commissioned for the 300th anniversary of Omsk, which was celebrated in 2016, but in 2012 it was announced that the work was being stopped.

=== Plans and current state ===
In July 2017, the airport was sold to airport operator Novaport, who decided to restart construction by investing 11 billion rubles over a course of three years. The airport is proposed to be built on a new site, rather than continue working on the previous long-lasting construction, which in recent years has become a venue for street racing auto-matches Currently, only plans, there were no official documents signed, but Novaport promises to finish the airport construction for three years. However in October 2017, Airports of Regions also brought its interest to take part in the airports construction. Due to the question of investment and the operator choice difficulty, on first quarter of 2018, the government of Omsk Oblast' will select the main investor into the project.

In 2024, the Governor of Omsk Oblast, Vitaly Khotsenko announced that design and engineering work was underway to restart construction. The existing unfinished airport infrastructure would be largely removed, with construction of a new 3,200 m long runway, apron accommodating 25 aircraft, and passenger terminal able to handle at least 700 passengers an hour on domestic flights, and 600 for international flights. It was stated that construction was expected to begin in 2026. During the 2024 St. Petersburg International Economic Forum, an agreement was signed between the Government of Omsk Oblast and Airport of Regions, for a period of 49 years. In November 2024, the project received funding from the federal budget, with 9.8 billion rubles allocated for 2026-2027.

In June 2025, the Russian Ministry of Economic Development reported that the cost of the airport had risen to 51 billion rubles. By August, the cost had risen once more to 64.6 billion rubles.

In September 2025, demolition work began on the unfinished airport terminal.
