= Novaport =

Russian transport company

- Company type: Limited liability company
- Founded: 2007
- Headquarters: Moscow, Russia
- Parent: AEON Corporation
- Website: www.novaport.ru

Novaport Holding is a Russian transport company which operates regional airports, and holds interests in the operation of several other airports.

== History ==
Before the official creation of Novaport, the company's owner acquired a 38% stake in Tolmachevo Airport in 2004 and 48% of Barnaul Airport's operator. The airport operator Novaport was created in 2007 and acquired 100% of Kadala Airport's operator Aerochita.

In March 2008, Novaport announced a $1 billion budget to expand its portfolio of regional airports over the next five years. That same year, Novaport acquired 69% of Chelyabinsk Airport and 43% of Narimanovo Airport's operator.

In September 2011, Novaport finalized the 51% purchase of the Tolmachevo Airport through its Moscow-based subsidiary AeroService Complex, bringing its stake to 68%. AeroService Complex then sold its 68% stake in August 2011 to Cyprus-based TS Trans Siberia, an offshore company also linked to Roman Trotsanko, the owner of Novaport.

In November 2015, Novaport acquired Murmansk Airport from its former owner, Gazprom Oil, with plans to develop flights for the low-cost airline Podeba to the airport. In May 2016, Novaport presented its plan to build a new terminal, aiming to increase passenger numbers to 1.7 million by 2030 (up from 751,300 in 2015).

In July 2016, Novaport purchased Khrabrovo Airport and Mineralnye Vody Airport from Aeroinvest.

In February 2017, Novaport invested $500,000 in the online service Grabr, which provides a solution for purchasing goods abroad by hiring a traveler.

In March 2017, Novaport expressed interest in acquiring 100% of the Belgrade Airport.

In August 2017, Novaport began discussions to purchase Omsk-Fyodorovka Airport. However in October 2017, Airports of Regions also showed interest in the airport's development.

== Operations ==
Airports partially owned and/or managed by Novaport.

Novaport Holding is one of the largest regional airport operators in Russia with 16 airports. Novaport serviced more than 21.6mln passengers in 2018 and is leading Russia's drive to enhance regional connectivity across the country's vast geography and multitude of time zones. As of December 2018, it holds or operates a major equity stake in 14 regional airports in Novosibirsk, Chelyabinsk, Volgograd, Tomsk Astrakhan, Chita, Tyumen, Perm, Murmansk, Kemerovo, Kaliningrad, Mineralnye Vody, Ulan-Ude, Vladikavkaz and possesses minority interest (48-49%) in Barnaul and Stavropol airports.

Airport	Ownership	Country	City served	Passengers (2016)
Baikal International Airport		Russia	Ulan-Ude	
Barnaul Airport	48%	Russia	Barnaul	
Bogashevo Airport		Russia	Tomsk	
Chelyabinsk Airport	69%	Russia	Chelyabinsk	1.2m
Kadala Airport	100%	Russia	Chita	
Kemerovo International Airport	90%	Russia	Kemerovo	
Khrabrovo Airport		Russia	Kaliningrad	1.57m
Mineralnye Vody Airport		Russia	Mineralnye Vody	1.73m
Murmansk Airport		Russia	Murmansk	0.763m
Narimanovo Airport		Russia	Astrakhan	0.525m
Perm International Airport	75%	Russia	Perm	
Roshchino International Airport	100%	Russia	Tyumen	
Tolmachevo Airport	68%	Russia	Novosibirsk	4m
Volgograd International Airport		Russia	Volgograd	0.811m

== Governance ==
Novaport Holding is owned by Russian billionaire Roman Trotsenko, the former advisor to the head of Rosneft. Novaport is a subsidiary of Roman Trotsenko's AEON Corporation, who is also the president of Russia's state-run United Shipbuilding Corporation. AEON Corporation also owns assets in the shipbuilding, telecommunications and real estate sectors.

The deputy CEO of the company is Anna Varshavskaya.
