= Novy Urengoy Airport =

Airport in Yamalo-Nenets Autonomous Okrug, Russia

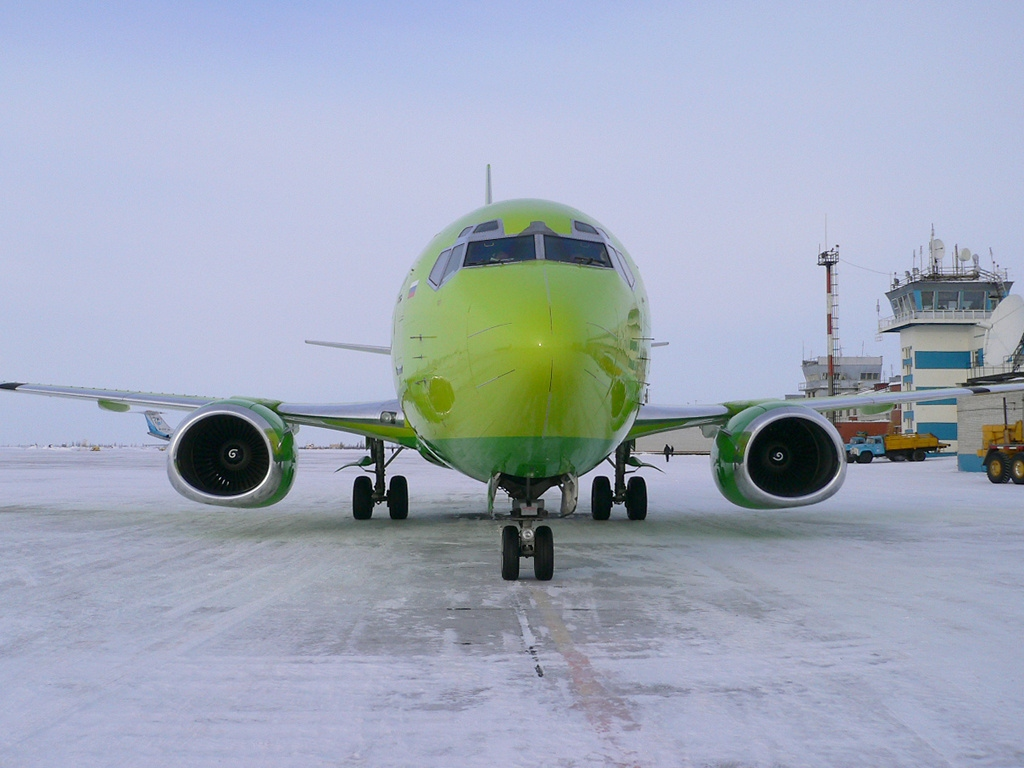
- IATA: NUX; ICAO: USMU

Summary
- Airport type: Public
- Owner: Government of YaNAO
- Operator: Airports of Regions
- Serves: Novy Urengoy, Yamalo-Nenets Autonomous Okrug, Russia
- Elevation AMSL: 64 m / 210 ft
- Coordinates: 66°04′21″N 76°31′19″E
- Website: ar-nux.ru

Maps
- Yamalo-Nenets Autonomous Okrug in Russia

- Location of the airport in Yamalo-Nenets

Runways
Direction	Length		Surface
Direction	m	ft	Surface
09/27	2,550	8,366	Concrete

Statistics (2018)
- Passengers: 972,668
- Sources: Russian Federal Air Transport Agency (see also provisional 2018 statistics)

Novy Urengoy Airport (IATA: NUX, ICAO: USMU) is an airport in Yamalo-Nenets Autonomous Okrug, Russia located 4 km southwest of Novy Urengoy. It handles medium-sized aircraft.

== History ==
=== New terminal construction ===
On 7 September 2018, the airport started to be operated by Airports of Regions with construction of a new terminal, parking space, apron and runway refurbishment. Initially, construction was planned to finish by end of 2021, but due to issues faced from COVID-19 pandemic, construction will finish by December 2022.

== Airlines and destinations ==
Airlines	Destinations
Gazpromavia	Seasonal charter: Moscow–Vnukovo, Tyumen, Ufa
Red Wings Airlines	Makhachkala, Nizhnekamsk, Samara, Saratov, Ufa
Rossiya	Krasnoyarsk–International
S7 Airlines	Moscow–Domodedovo, Novosibirsk
UVT Aero	Bugulma, Kazan, Samara, Tobolsk
Utair	Tyumen, Ufa, Yekaterinburg
Yamal Airlines	Mineralnye Vody, Moscow–Domodedovo, Moscow–Sheremetyevo, Omsk, Saint Petersburg, Salekhard, Sochi, Tyumen, Ufa, Yekaterinburg

== Statistics ==
=== Annual traffic ===
Passengers
Year	2013	2014	2015	2016	2017	2018	2019
Passengers	732,5	▲815,7	▲870,7	▲896,6	▲937,6	937,4	973,7
Cargo
Tones	—N/a	3 183,4	▲3 803,7	▲3 843,5	▲4 167,8		
Link: Rosaviation

== See also ==
- List of airports in Russia
- List of the busiest airports in the former USSR
