= Platov International Airport =

Airport in Rostov-on-Don, Russia

Platov International Airport Международный аэропорт Платов

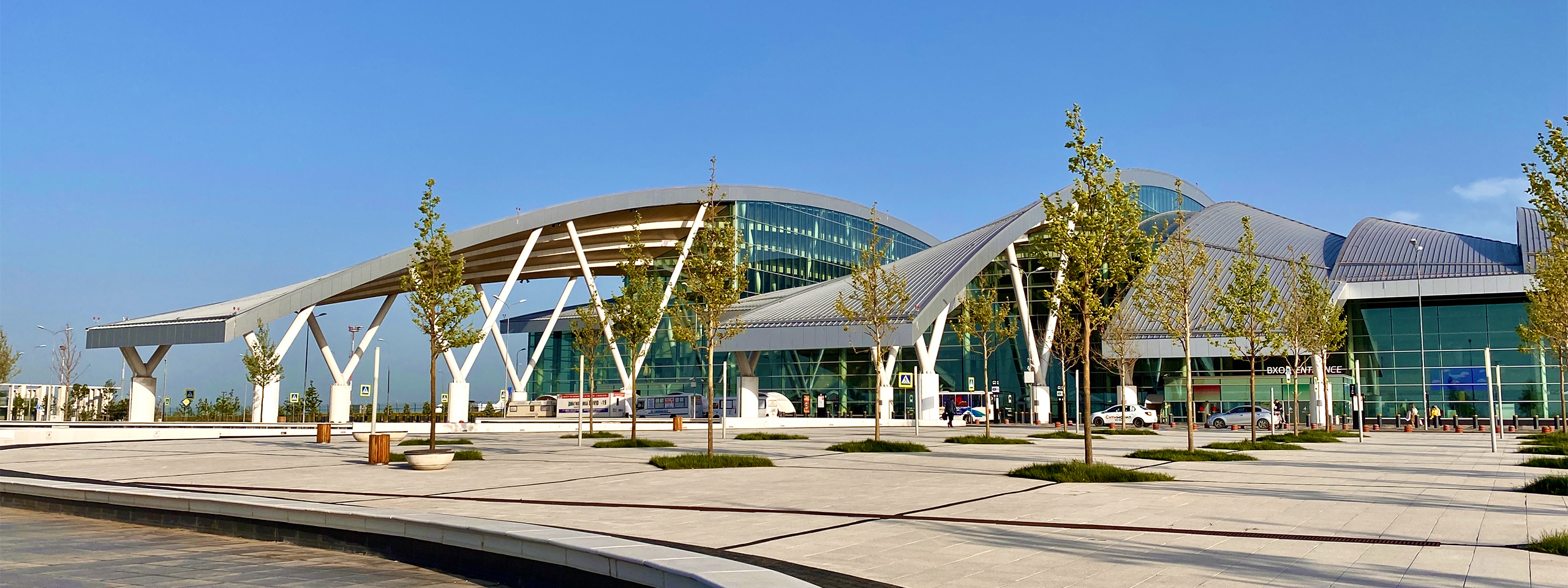
- IATA: ROV; ICAO: URRP

Summary
- Airport type: Public
- Operator: Airports of Regions
- Serves: Rostov-on-Don
- Location: Aksaysky District, Rostov Oblast, Russia
- Opened: 27 November 2017; 8 years ago
- Passenger services ceased: 24 February 2022
- Hub for: Azimuth
- Focus city for: Azur Air; Pobeda; Rossiya Airlines; Ural Airlines
- Elevation AMSL: 213 ft (65 m)
- Coordinates: 47°29′38″N 39°55′29″E
- Website: Platov International Airport

Map
- Location of the airport in Rostov Oblast Location of the airport in Russia Location of the airport in Europe

Runways
Direction	Length		Surface
Direction	ft	m	Surface
05/23	11,811	3,600	Concrete/Asphalt

Statistics (2020)
- Passengers: 2,086,000 ▼ (-32%)
- Source: , List of the busiest airports in Russia

Platov International Airport (IATA: ROV, ICAO: URRP) (Russian: Международный аэропорт Платов) is an airport close to the stanitsa of Grushevskaya, Aksaysky District, Rostov Oblast, Russia near the city of Novocherkassk northeast of Rostov-on-Don. It serves Rostov-on-Don (as a replacement for the old Rostov-on-Don Airport) and started operation in December 2017. It is named after Matvei Platov.

It was originally planned that the airport would open in November 2017, with passenger navigation starting on 1 December 2017. The project has a capacity of 5 million passengers per year. Azimuth will be the main company serving the airport. The airport was opened on 27 November 2017, with the new highway to the airport and final tests before the operations would commence. The airport commenced passenger service on 7 December 2017, and the old airport was scheduled to officially cease all its operations on 1 March 2018. In 2018, for the first year of operation of the airport, 3,236,000 passengers passed through this airport. The airport has been closed since the beginning of the 2022 Russian invasion of Ukraine.

While the airport functioned as a major regional hub since 2017, all civilian flight operations have been suspended since 24 February 2022. The facility remains closed due to security concerns as of late 2025, with the Federal Air Transport Agency (Rosaviatsiya) formally dismissing reports of a near-term reopening.

== History ==
=== Name choice ===
Initially, the project name was "Yuzhny" (eng. Southern). During the voting procedure for the new airport's name, "Platov" was the top choice with 40% of overall votes, whereas "Yuzhny" and "Rostov-on-Don International" had 27% and 34% respectively. Therefore, on 20 January 2017, Government of Russian Federation officially named the airport "Platov International Airport", in honor of Matvei Platov, a Russian general commanding the Don Cossacks.

=== Certification and opening ===
At the end of September, the airport construction was finished. Then, 16 October, Rosaviation had approved the new airport and the airport plans to commence the testing procedure till 20 November. After all the stages are done, the airport plans to fully open 1 December. The old airport will close, due to development issues, caused by the location inside town. More likely, the building will be demolished. On 18 November, the first aircraft Airbus A319 of Rossiya Airlines and Sukhoi Superjet 100 of Azimuth landed at the airport. These were the test mode flights. On 24 November 2017, the first 150 volunteers tested the new airport's equipment. On 27 November, Platov received its IATA code ROV from the current airport, whereas old airport received a new IATA code RVI.

The airport was officially opened on 7 December 2017 at 11:00am, with the first passenger flight of Pobeda Boeing 737-800 arriving from Moscow–Vnukovo, following with other domestic and international flights. By 1 March 2018, the old airport was going to be officially closed. At the time of construction, Platov airport was named the most expensive airport in Russia.

On 24 February 2022, in relation to the beginning of the Russian invasion of Ukraine, the airport, together with other airports in Southern Russia, were closed without prior notice.

== Facilities ==
=== Passenger main terminal ===
The airport terminal is 50,000 square metres (540,000 sq ft). There are 9 air-bridges and 9 bus gates. Moreover, the airport complex contains a cargo terminal and a VIP terminal with an area of 2,880 square metres (31,000 sq ft). The car parking can accept a maximum of 2500 cars.

=== VIP terminal ===
The airport has a VIP terminal, with a total area of 2,880 m². The complex was opened in early 2018.

== Transport ==
Shuttle buses go from the center of Rostov-on-Don to the airport, the route interval is from 05:00 to 23:00 every half hour, from 23:00 to 05:00 every hour. Travel time is 1 hour.

== Airlines and destinations ==
The following airlines operated from Platov International before the launch of the Russian invasion of Ukraine on 24 February 2022 to the following destinations:

Airlines	Destinations
Aeroflot	Moscow–Sheremetyevo, Yerevan
Air Serbia	Belgrade
Azimuth	Astrakhan, Baku, Bishkek, Chelyabinsk, Dubai–International, Grozny, Istanbul, Kaliningrad, Kaluga, Kazan, Makhachkala, Mineralnye Vody, Minsk, Moscow–Vnukovo, Nizhny Novgorod, Novosibirsk, Omsk, Perm, Saint Petersburg, Samara, Saratov, Simferopol, Sochi, Tel Aviv, Tyumen, Ufa, Yekaterinburg, Yerevan
Azur Air	Seasonal charter: Antalya, Dubai–International, Goa, Pattaya-U-Tapao, Phuket, Zanzibar
Flydubai	Seasonal: Dubai–International
IrAero	Baku, Moscow–Domodedovo
NordStar	Cairo, Norilsk, Yekaterinburg
Nordwind Airlines	Antalya, Baku, Istanbul, Yerevan; Seasonal charter: Phuket
Pegas Fly	Sochi
Red Wings Airlines	Seasonal charter: Antalya, Istanbul
Rossiya Airlines	Moscow–Sheremetyevo, Saint Petersburg
S7 Airlines	Moscow–Domodedovo
Smartavia	Moscow–Domodedovo, Saint Petersburg
Turkish Airlines	Istanbul
Ural Airlines	Antalya
Utair	Astrakhan, Moscow–Vnukovo, Vladikavkaz, Volgograd
Uzbekistan Airways	Tashkent

== Statistics ==
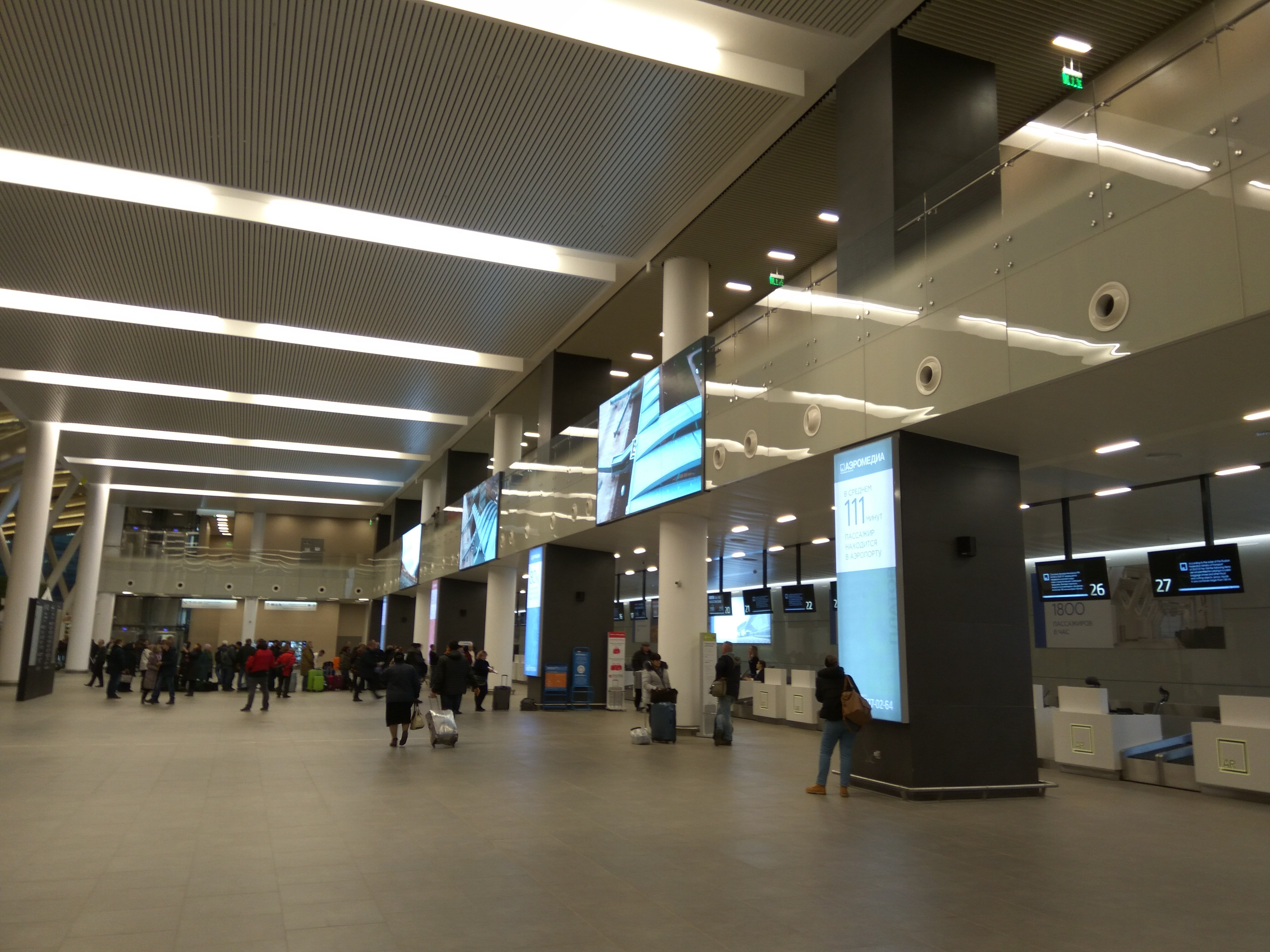
Check-in area

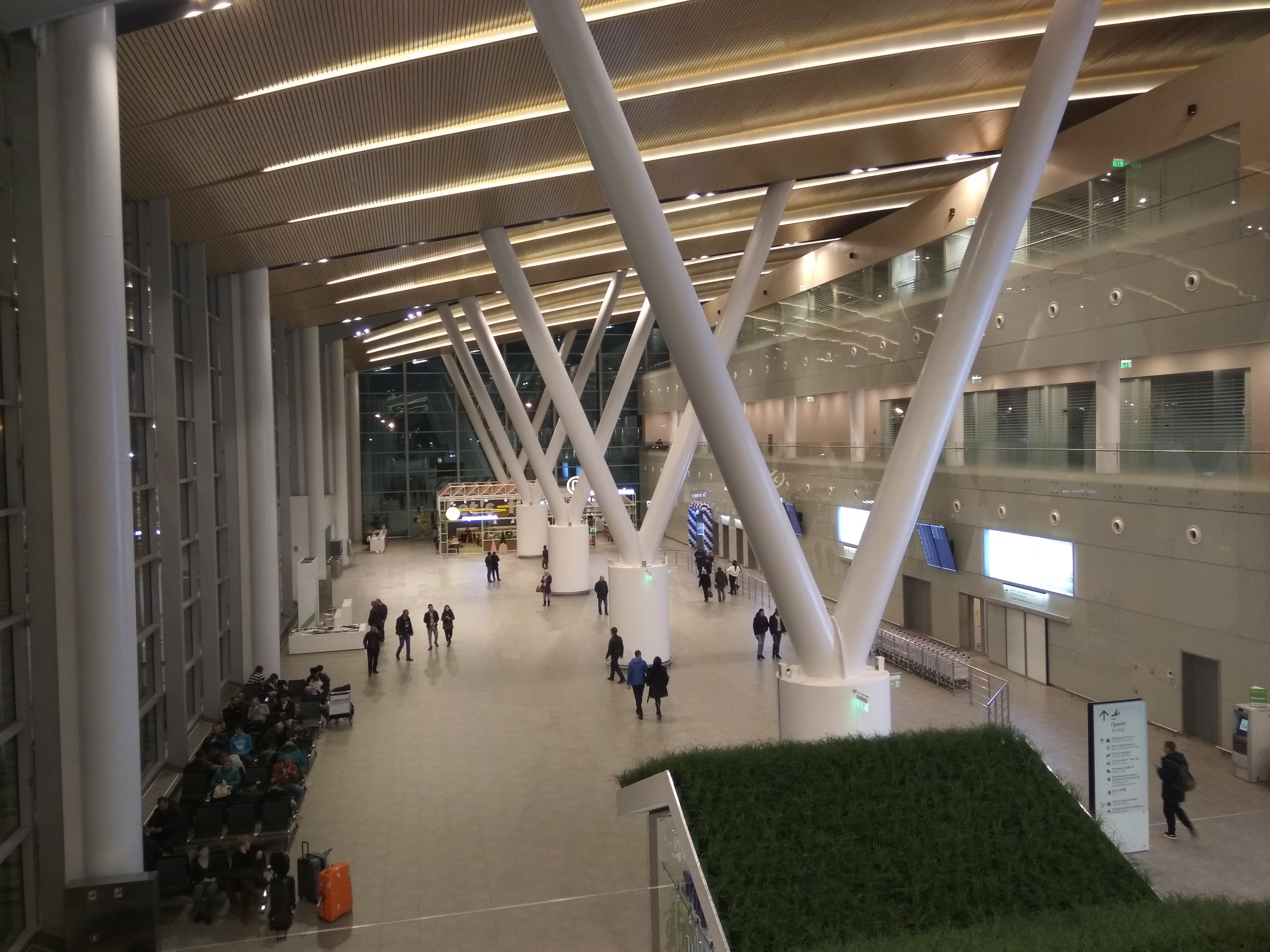
Arrivals hall

=== Annual traffic ===
Annual passenger traffic
Year	Passengers	% Change
2017	2,621,000; Including defunct Rostov-on-Don Airport	▲ ?
2018	3,236,000	▲19%
2019	3,060,000	▼6%
2020	2,086,000	▼-32%

== Transportation ==
=== Road ===
Currently, the airport is connected to the city center by M4 highway, which was reconstructed before the airport construction finished. From 1 December, when the flights commence officially, the new shuttle vans will go to the city center every 20 minutes, nevertheless, the Rostov government had purchased 20 vans for this route.

=== Railway ===
In perspective, the Aeroexpress is also planned for the route to city center, but only in case of annual passenger flow of 6 million. Currently, the government of Rostov, are planning to construct a railway line that, apart from Rostov-on-Don, will serve other big habitations, located nearby the airport.

== See also ==
- List of the busiest airports in Russia
- List of the busiest airports in Europe
- List of the busiest airports in the former USSR
