= Saratov Gagarin Airport =

Airport near Saratov, Russia

Gagarin International Airport Международный Аэропорт Гагарин

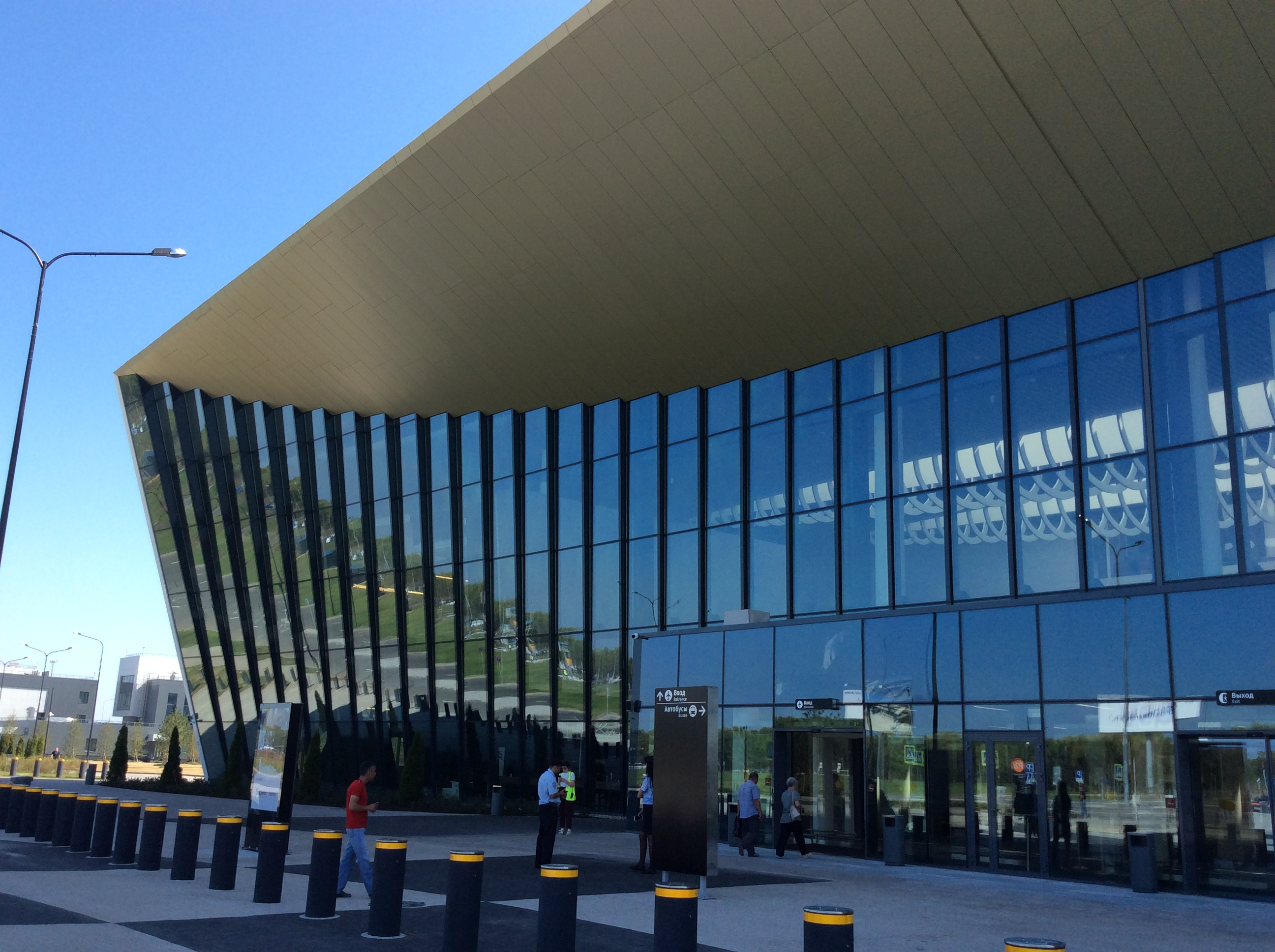
- IATA: GSV; ICAO: UWSG

Summary
- Airport type: Public
- Operator: Airports of Regions
- Serves: Saratov
- Location: Saburovka, Saratov oblast, Russia
- Elevation AMSL: 31 m / 103 ft
- Coordinates: 51°42′46″N 46°10′16″E
- Website: ar-gsv.ru

Map
- Saratov Saratov Oblast

Runways
Direction	Length		Surface
Direction	m	ft	Surface
08/26	3,000 x 45 (width)	9,840	Concrete

Gagarin International Airport (Russian: Международный Аэропорт Гагарин) is an airport near Saratov, Russia, that has been in operation since 20 August 2019.

== History ==
Saratov Central Airport had been the airport that served Saratov for many decades, having been opened under Soviet rule in 1931. Originally, the airfield was built relatively far away from the city, but the city's limits slowly caught up to the airport. By the early 1990s, the airfield was completely surrounded by an urban area with no room to expand. At the time there still was plenty of excess capacity left over to soak up the ever-growing passenger numbers; however, by about the mid-2000s it was realised that Saratov Central would soon be too small to handle the forecast passenger numbers.

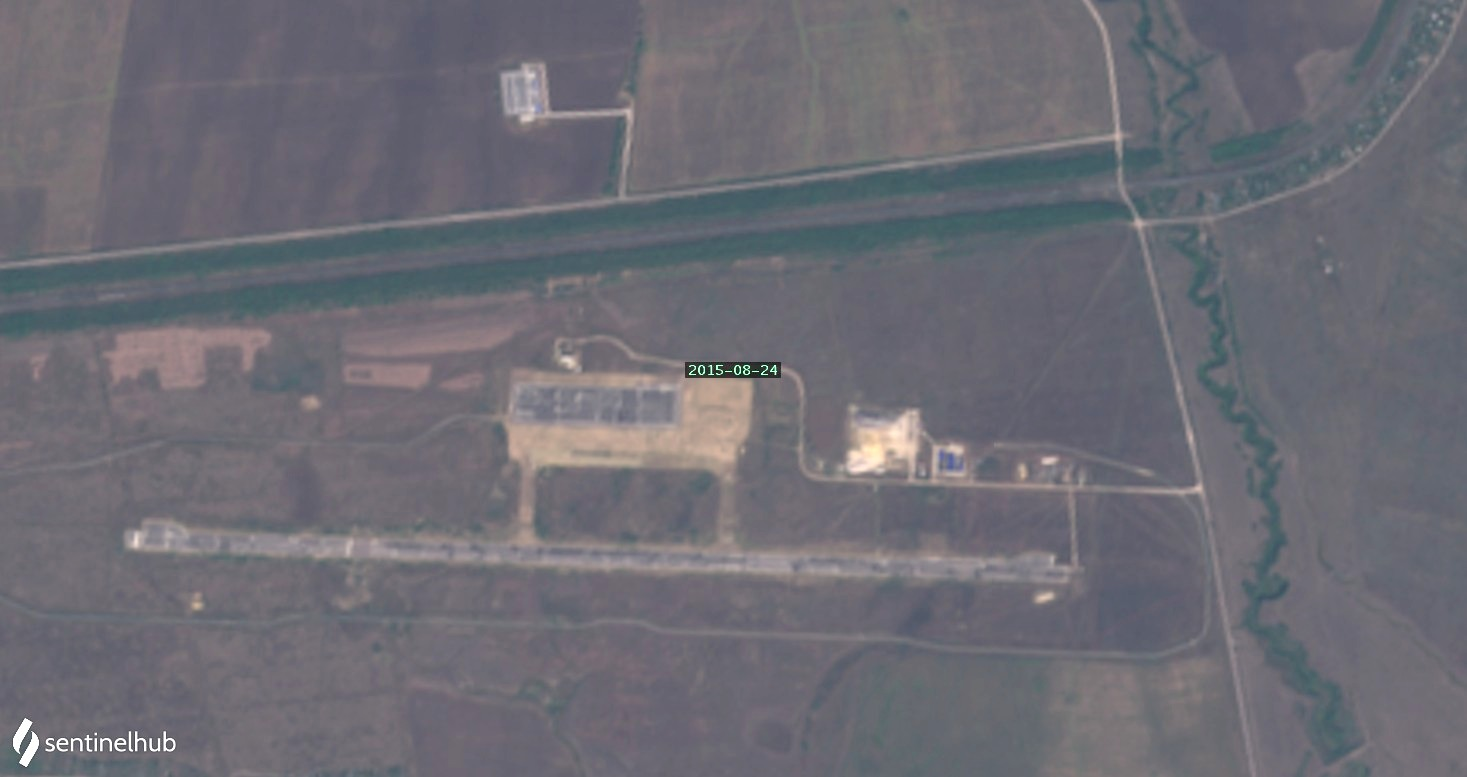
Satellite imagery of airport construction (2015)

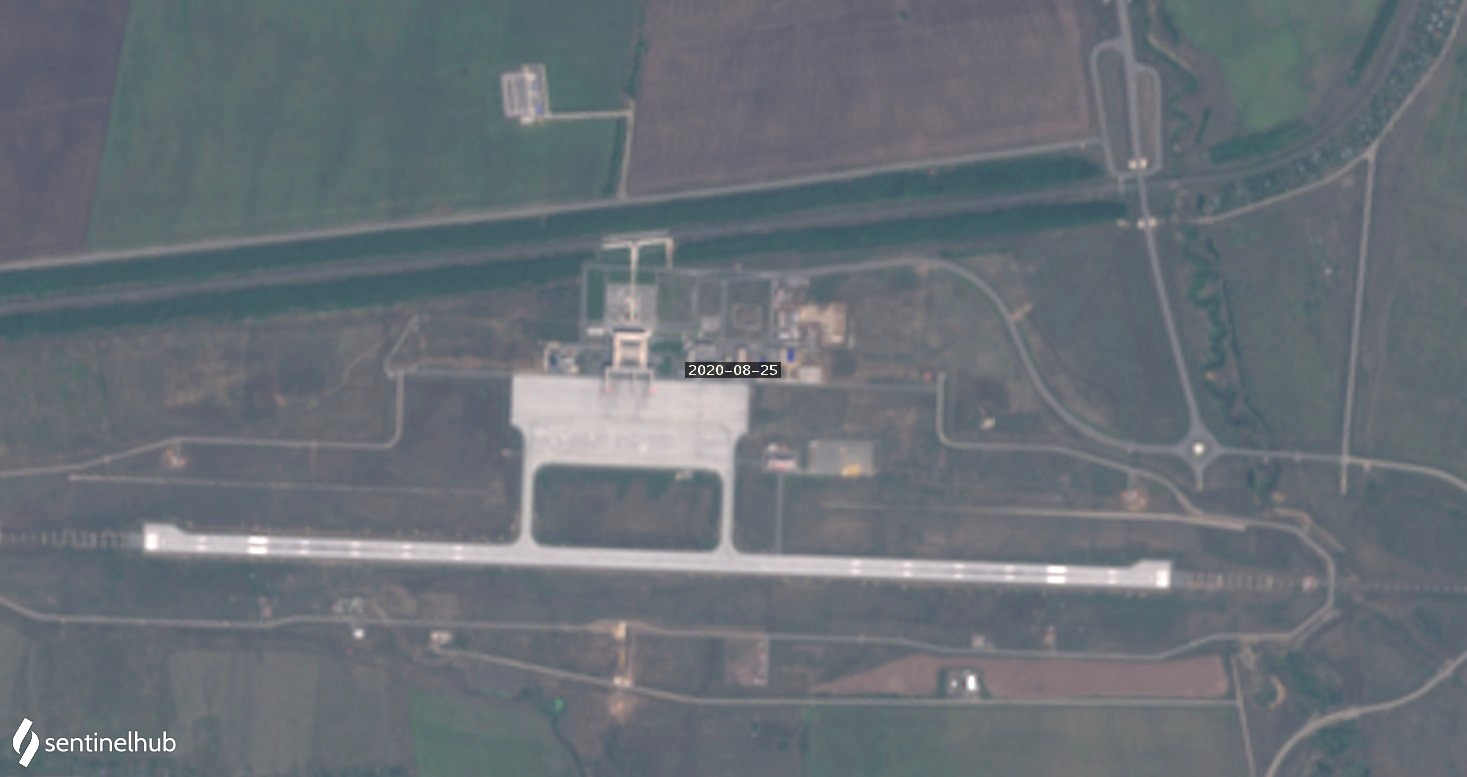
Satellite imagery of airport (2020)

=== Airports of Regions ===
In 2014, "Airports of Regions" presented a project for the new Saratov Airport. At that time it was still unknown whether it would be built on the old area, or on a new one. In January 2015, construction of the airport began. The terminal complex is currently being constructed. The total amount spent for the construction is from 10 to 7 billion rubles. It will be the third airport in Russia to be built from scratch after the breakup of the Soviet Union, after Talakan Airport in Yakutia and Platov International Airport in Rostov-on-Don, which also belongs to Airports of Regions.

=== Name decision ===
Airports of Regions initially gave the current airport's name to the one that is under construction, but in August, the constructors decided to call it "Gagarin". This has created confusion, since Orenburg Airport already has a similar name.

== Airlines and destinations ==
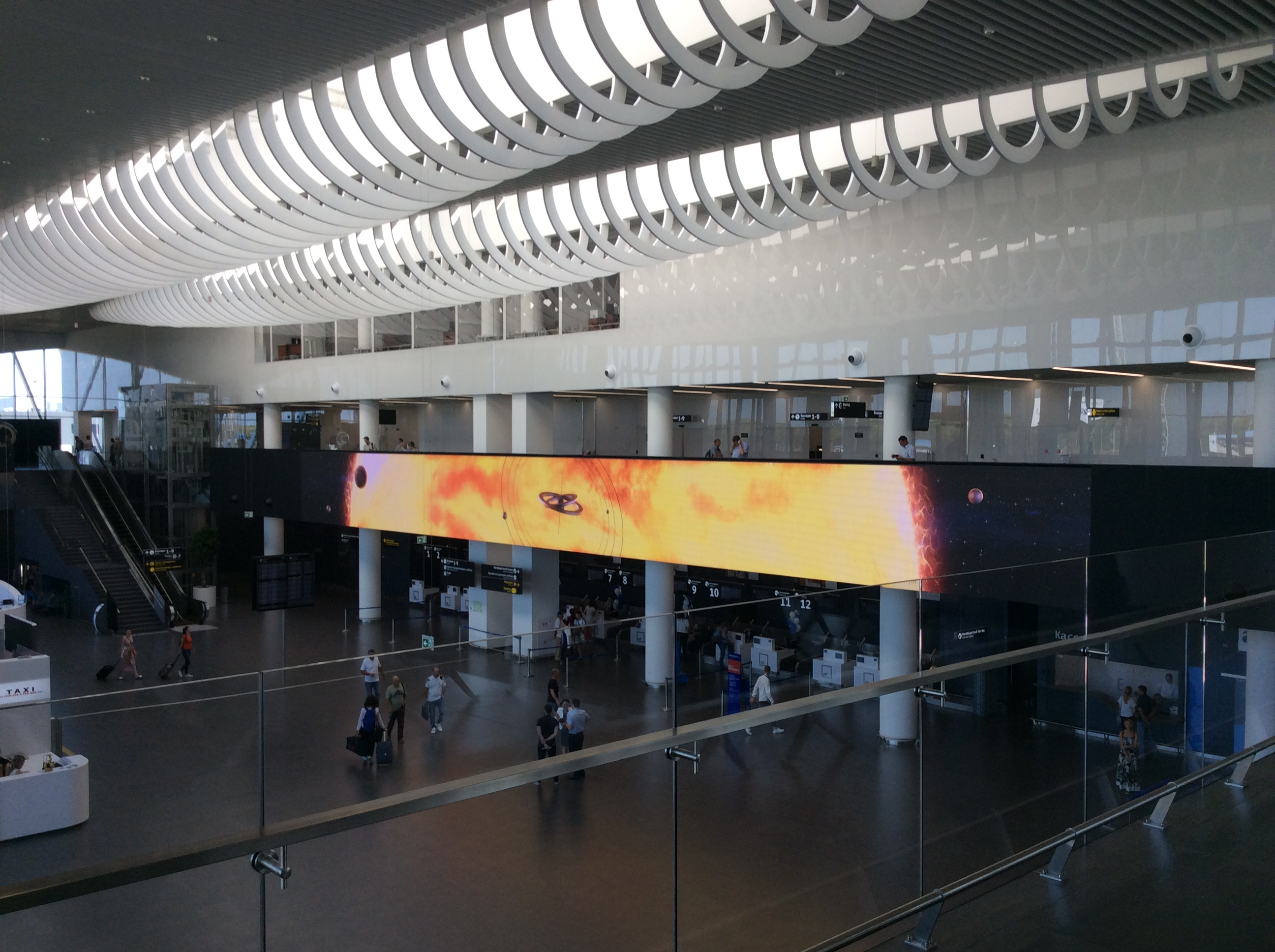
Terminal hall

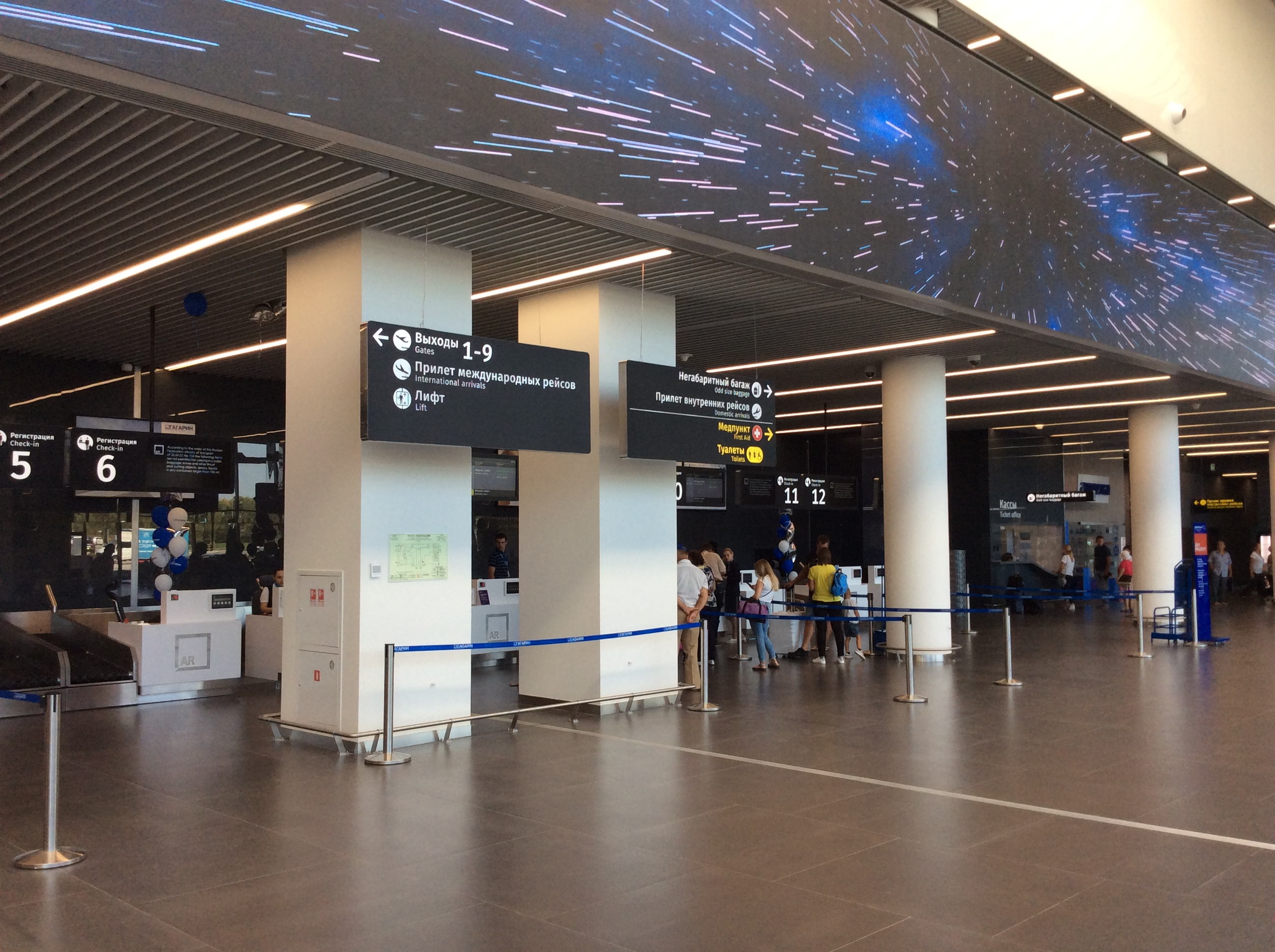
Check-in counters

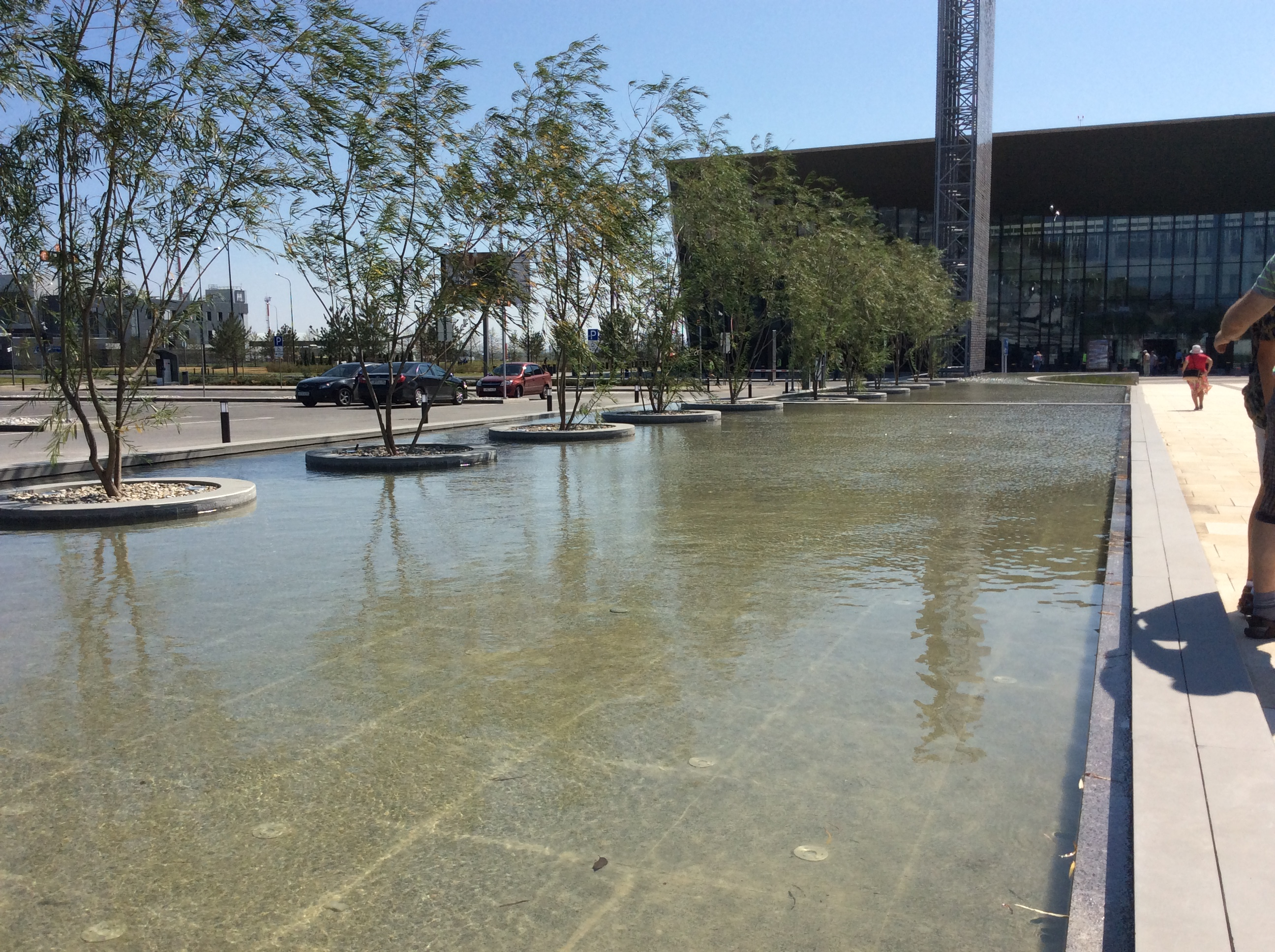
Terminal corridor

Airlines	Destinations
Aeroflot	Moscow–Sheremetyevo
Ikar	Kaliningrad
Nesma Airlines	Seasonal charter: Hurghada
Pobeda	Moscow–Sheremetyevo, Moscow–Vnukovo, Saint Petersburg, Sochi
Red Wings Airlines	Makhachkala, Novy Urengoy, Yekaterinburg; Seasonal: Batumi
Rossiya	Moscow–Sheremetyevo
S7 Airlines	Novosibirsk
Shirak Avia	Yerevan
Southwind Airlines	Seasonal charter: Antalya
Tailwind Airlines	Seasonal charter: Antalya
Utair	Seasonal charter: Surgut

== Transportation ==
=== Bus ===
Buses depart hourly from Saratov to the airport. The journey takes approximately 40 minutes.

=== Rail ===
The airport is connected by an alley to the railway platform. In case of the passenger increase, the airport will construct a separate railway terminal for the airport's needs. There is a separate express service to Saratov Railway Terminal and other standard services connecting the airport to other settlements, including Engels. The journey to Saratov takes 40 minutes.

=== Road ===
The airport is connected by a route that is next to the city, that was constructed specifically for the airport.

=== Water ===
The Volga river is near to the airport which makes it able to be connected to Saratov by water transport. Currently the journey takes 2 hours, but the Saratov Government promises to include in the service the express water-buses, that will shorten the journey.

== See also ==
- List of airports in Russia
- List of the busiest airports in the former USSR
