= Azimuth (airline) =

Russian airline

Azimuth АЗИМУТ

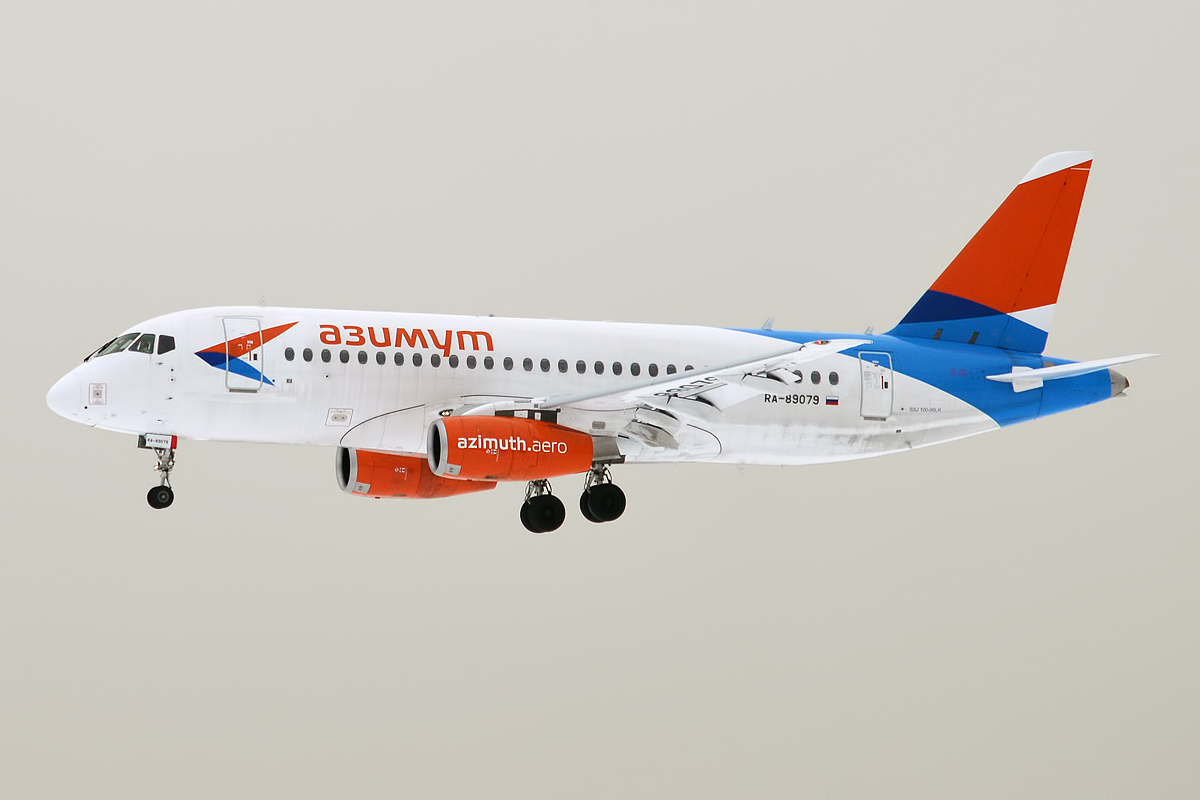
- Azimuth Sukhoi Superjet 100-95
IATA	ICAO	Call sign
A4	AZO	AZIMUTH
- Founded: February 2017
- Operating bases: Platov International Airport; Krasnodar International Airport
- Fleet size: 20
- Destinations: 49
- Headquarters: Rostov-on-Don, Russia
- Key people: Vitaliy Vantsev (co-founder); Pavel Yekzhanov (CEO)
- Website: https://azimuth.ru

Azimuth (Russian: АО «АЗИМУТ», branding itself as azimuth) is a Russian joint-stock company airline operating since 2017 based in Platov International Airport in Rostov-on-Don, the capital of Rostov Oblast. It is banned from flying in EU airspace.

== History ==
Due to the merger of Donavia with Rossiya Airlines in 2016, Rostov-on-Don lost its main airline, even though Rossiya continued the flights previously operated by Donavia. As Rostov-on-Don was selected as one of the host cities for the 2018 FIFA World Cup in Russia, there was a perceived need for another airline to provide quality flights to connect the cities of Southern Russia and Central Russia. Azimuth registered itself as a legal entity in Krasnodar, but re-registered itself in Rostov-on-Don in February 2017, with shareholders being co-owner of Vnukovo International Airport Vitaly Vantsev, Pavel Udod and Pavel Yekzhanov.

In March 2017, contracts were signed for the delivery of four Sukhoi Superjet 100 (SSJ100) regional jets. Another contract was signed for the delivery of four more SSJ100s. The delivery of the aircraft began in July 2017, with the airline receiving its first SSJ100 on 7 July through the State Transport Leasing Company (GTLK). The airline plans to further increase the fleet to 16 aircraft. On 18 August 2017, the airline received an air operator's certificate (AOC) from the Russian government giving the airline permission to commence flight operations.

Domestic routes to Kaliningrad, Chelyabinsk, Volgograd, Astrakhan, Surgut and Gelendzhik, as well as international routes to Yerevan, Prague, Frankfurt, Istanbul and Tel Aviv were planned to enter Azimuth's route network by 2021.

On 7 December 2017, Azimuth officially shifted all flights from Rostov-on-Don Airport to Platov International Airport.

Azimuth officially started international flights on 29 September 2018 when it started offering weekly flights to Bishkek. Two days later, Azimuth had its first flight to Yerevan, with a schedule offering three flights each week.

The airline, which obtained its Air Operator’s Certificate (AOC) in August 2017, is exempt from the requirement that Russian airlines must demonstrate at least two years’ of successful domestic operations before being allowed to perform international services. This is because the requirement does not apply to countries of the Eurasian Economic Union (EEU), of which Armenia and Kyrgyzstan are a part.

In December 2019, after more than two years of successful domestic and CIS operations, Azimuth started its first international flights outside the CIS, with flights to Tel Aviv begun 1 December and Munich starting 22 December. In the same month, Azimuth reached its operational break-even point, citing government subsidies and high dispatch reliability to be main contributing factors of its success.

In 2020, Azimuth began regular flights to Crimea.

Azimuth announced that it was planning to purchase the larger Airbus A220-300 with a seating maximum of 149 passengers. On 29 April 2021, the airline confirmed Airbus orders, for usage on international routes. As of October 2022, the order had been removed by Airbus. The already produced and fitted aircraft were allocated to the Italian flag carrier ITA Airways instead, following extensive economic sanctions on Russia following the 2022 Russian invasion of Ukraine.

== Corporate affairs and identity ==
Azimuth is headquartered in Rostov-on-Don, Rostov Oblast. Shareholders of the airline include Vitaliy Vantsev, who owns Vnukovo International Airport and Pavel Udod, former owner of Yakutia Airlines. As of April 2017, Azimuth's CEO position is held by Pavel Yekzhanov. Azimuth's logo and livery was designed by Asgard Branding based in St. Petersburg. According to the designers, the logo symbolizes the sun, the sea, the sky and southern hospitality.

== Destinations ==
As of December 2019, Azimuth Airlines operated flights to 30 domestic destinations and three international destinations.

=== Codeshare agreements ===
Azimuth has codeshare agreement with the following airlines:

- S7 Airlines

== Accidents ==
On 24 November 2024, an Azimuth Sukhoi Superjet 100 aircraft caught fire after landing at Antalya Airport in Turkey. The aircraft was carrying 89 passengers and six crew from Sochi to Antalya, Turkey. All passengers and crew were safely evacuated using the emergency slides following the fire which had started in one of the engines. The aircraft was substantially damaged. No description of recent aircraft maintenance nor how that may have been affected by sanctions following the Russian invasion of Ukraine was included in initial reports.

== Fleet ==
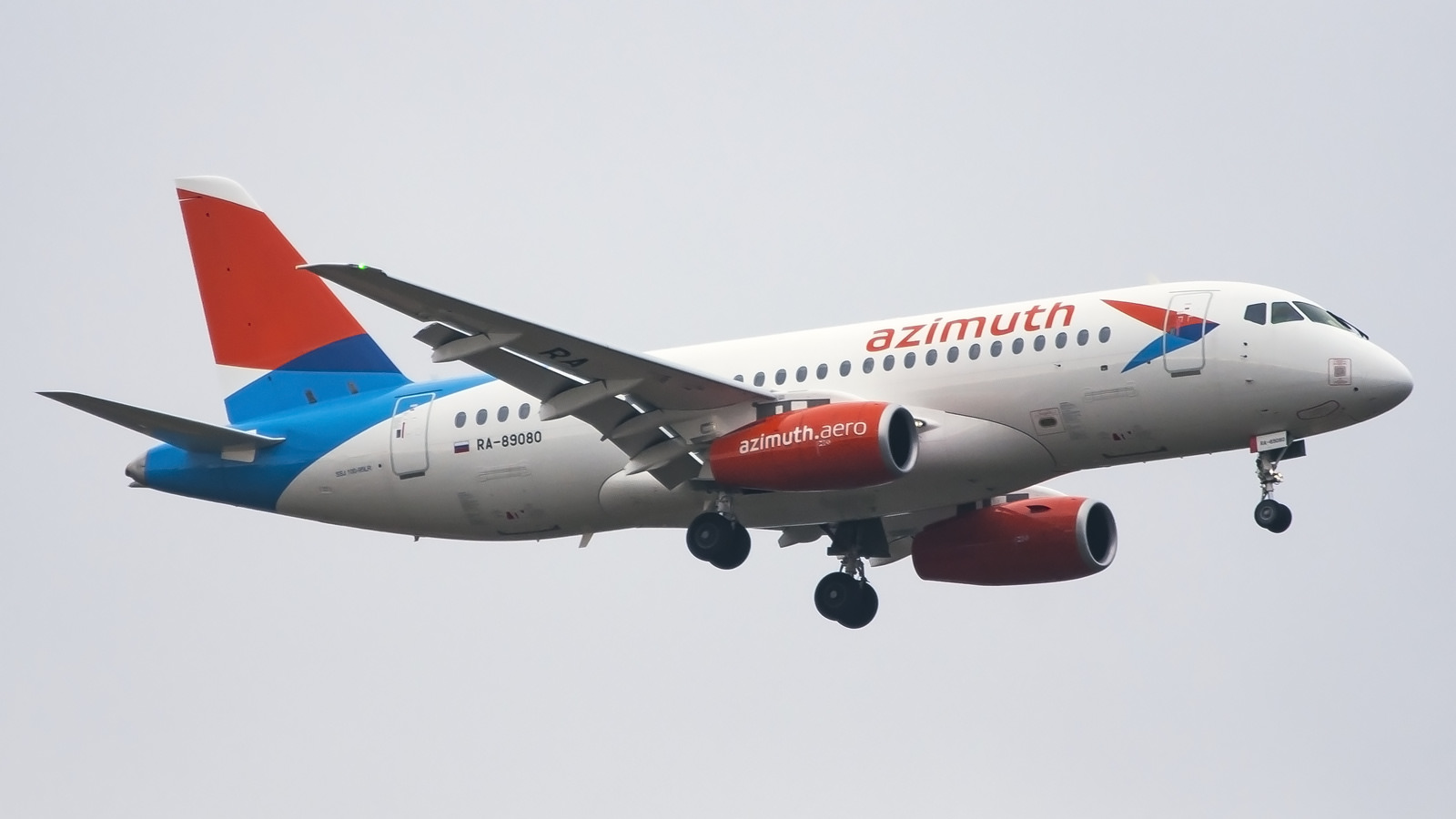
Azimuth Sukhoi Superjet 100

As of August 2025, Azimuth operates the following aircraft:

Aircraft	In service	Orders	Passengers	Notes
Sukhoi Superjet 100	20	—	103	One in M-1 Global livery
Total	20	—		

== See also ==
- Donavia
- List of airlines of Russia
- List of airports in Russia
- Transport in Russia
