= Airports of Regions =

Airport holding and management company in Russia

CJSC HC Airports of Regions
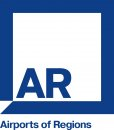
- Airports of Regions logo.
- Company type: Private/Holding company
- Industry: Transportation Infrastructure
- Headquarters: Moscow, Moscow Oblast, Russia
- Area served: Russia
- Key people: Evgeniy A. Chudnovskiy (general director)
- Services: Airport Management
- Parent: Retrans
- Website: www.ar-management.ru

Airports of Regions (Russian: Аэропорты Регионов, /Aeroporty Regionov/) is the leading airport management company in Russia and is owned by Retrans company. It is based in Moscow, Russia. AR works in the transportation industry and provides services such as airport management and airport facility development. The company currently has operating rights over 10 airports in Russia.

The general director of the company as of November 8, 2014, is Evgeniy A. Chudnovskiy.

== Operations ==
Airports partially owned and/or managed by Airports of Regions:

Airport	Status	City served
Koltsovo Airport	Active	Yekaterinburg
Kurumoch International Airport	Active	Samara
Novy Urengoy Airport	Active	Novy Urengoy
Platov International Airport	Active	Rostov-on-Don
Saratov Gagarin Airport	Active	Saratov
Strigino Airport	Active	Nizhny Novgorod
Elizovo Airport	Active	Petropavlovsk-Kamchatsky
Blagoveshchensk Airport	Active	Blagoveshchensk
Orenburg Airport	Active	Orenburg
Remezov Airport	Active	Tobolsk
