= Kurchatov Chelyabinsk International Airport =

Airport in Chelyabinsk, Russia

Kurchatov Chelyabinsk International Airport Курчатов Международный аэропорт Челябинска
- Kurchatov Airport view

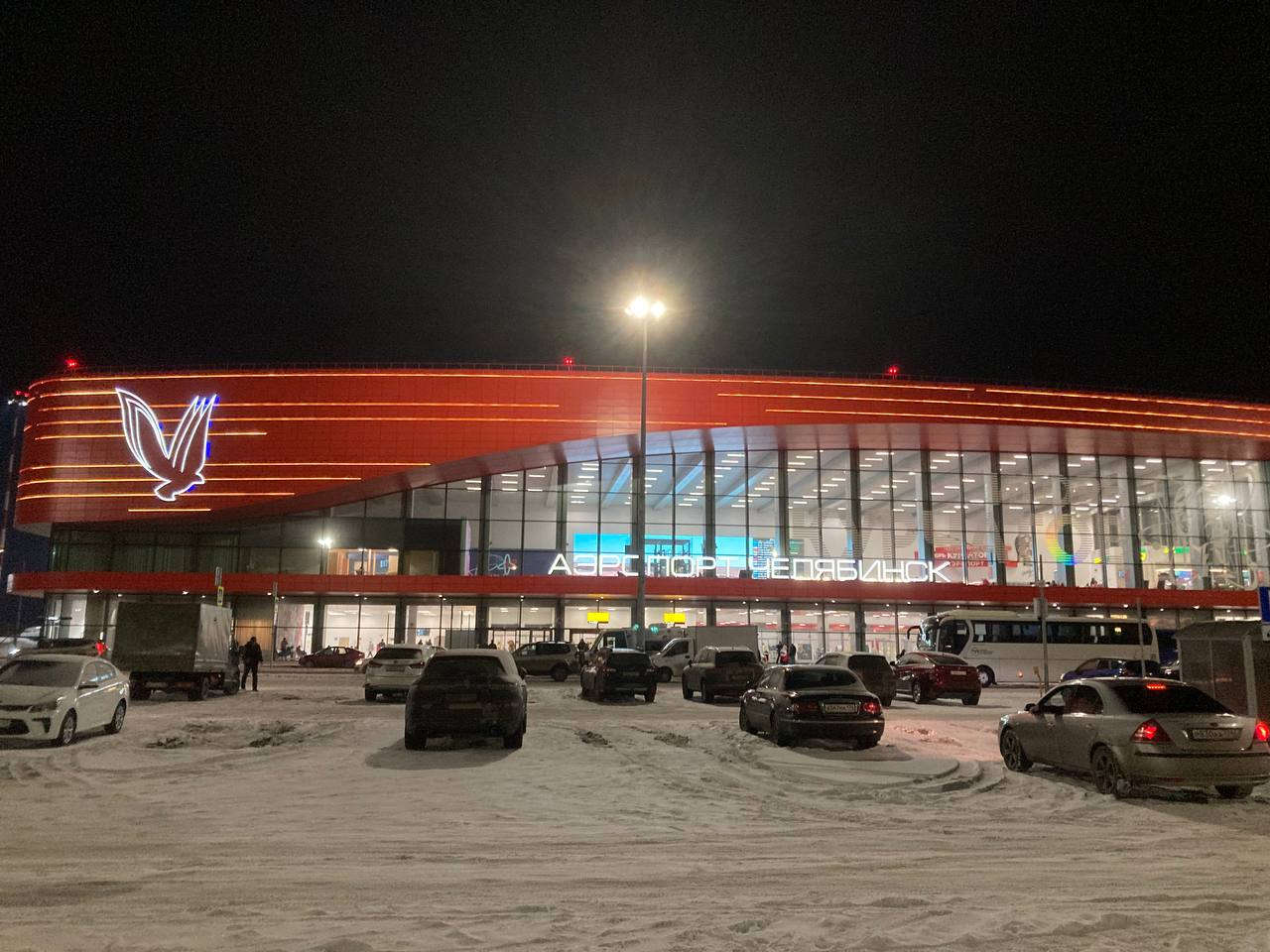
- IATA: CEK; ICAO: USCC

Summary
- Airport type: Public
- Operator: Novaport
- Serves: Chelyabinsk
- Location: Chelyabinsk, Russia
- Hub for: Red Wings Airlines
- Focus city for: Ural Airlines; Yamal Airlines
- Elevation AMSL: 771 ft (235 m)
- Coordinates: 55°18′18″N 61°30′18″E
- Website: cekport.ru
- Interactive map of Kurchatov Chelyabinsk International Airport

Runways
Direction	Length		Surface
Direction	ft	m	Surface
09/27	10,499	3,200	Concrete

Statistics (2018)
- Number of passengers: 1,640,535
- Sources: Russian Federal Air Transport Agency (see also provisional 2018 statistics)

Kurchatov Chelyabinsk International Airport (Balandino) (IATA: CEK, ICAO: USCC) is an international airport in Russia located 18 km north of Chelyabinsk. It services large airliners and can park up to 51 aircraft. It also serves as a secondary hub for Ural Airlines and Yamal Airlines.

== History ==
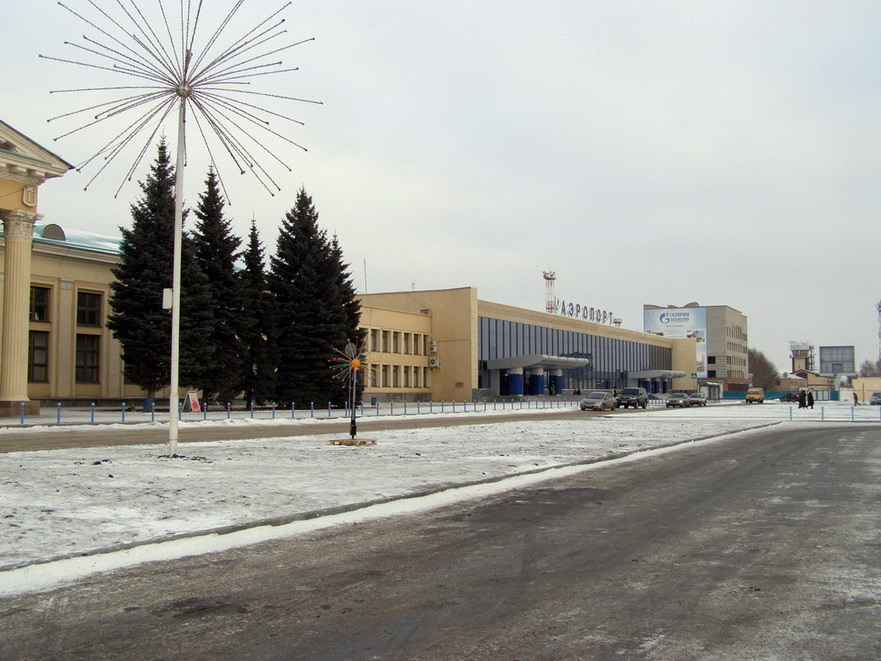
Terminal buildings of Chelyabinsk Airport

Passenger flights to Chelyabinsk were served by Chelyabinsk Shagol Airport from 1938 until it was repurposed for military only use.

The current Chelyabinsk airport, initially called Balandino Airport, was opened in late 1953 with a passenger terminal and a dirt runway. The runway was paved in December 1962. A year later, the first jet plane (a Tu-104) arrived at the airport.

A new terminal was built in 1974 which remains in service to this day as one of the terminal buildings. In 1994, the government-owned airport was privatized and started its first international flights.

Passenger traffic reached 1.1 million and declined heavily during the 1990s. In 2013, the airport handled 1.2 million passengers, breaking the Soviet-time record.

The new, longer runway was built in 1999, while the old runway was repurposed as a taxiway. The airport can accept heavy aircraft including the Boeing 747 and the An-225.

=== New terminal construction and airport expansion ===
The construction of the new passenger terminal is planned at Chelyabinsk Airport, this is done for BRICS summit in 2020. The project includes the construction of the new terminal, which was scheduled to commence in summer 2018 and finish by December 2019. The complex will be able to handle 2,5 million passengers per annum. The next plan for the airport is to take the third category of ICAO. This category in Russia is owned only by Moscow's Domodedovo and Sheremetyevo Airports and Pulkovo Airport in Saint Petersburg.

== Airlines and destinations ==
=== Passenger ===
Airlines	Destinations
Aeroflot	Moscow–Sheremetyevo
AlMasria Universal Airlines	Seasonal charter: Hurghada, Sharm El Sheikh
Azimuth	Mineralnye Vody
Azur Air	Seasonal charter: Phuket
Centrum Air	Tashkent (begins 4 December 2026)
Iraero	Seasonal: Baku
Nordwind Airlines	Saint Petersburg, Sochi
NordStar Airlines	Krasnodar, Norilsk
Pobeda	Moscow–Sheremetyevo, Moscow–Vnukovo, Saint Petersburg, Sochi
Red Wings Airlines	Minsk, Norilsk, Yerevan; Seasonal: Batumi
Rossiya	Krasnoyarsk–International, Moscow–Sheremetyevo, Saint Petersburg; Seasonal charter: Hurghada, Sharm El Sheikh
RusLine	Khanty-Mansiysk
S7 Airlines	Novosibirsk
Smartavia	Kaliningrad, Saint Petersburg
Ural Airlines	Dushanbe, Krasnodar, Osh, Sochi
Utair	Surgut
UVT Aero	Nizhny Novgorod, Kazan

=== Cargo ===
Airlines	Destinations
Grizodubova Air Company	Moscow–Vnukovo

== Passenger statistics ==
Chelyabinsk Airport statistics
Year	Total passengers	Change	Domestic	International	Aircraft departures
2000	274 236	+0,1% ▲	208 912	65 324	2 656
2001	297 198	+8,4% ▲	325 077	62 121	3 205
2002	302 626	+1,8% ▲	234 495	67 701	3 152
2003	359 822	+18,9% ▲	282 186	77 636	3 439
2004	404 151	+12,3% ▲	307 231	96 920	3 550
2005	386 115	−4,5% ▼	333 206	52 909	3 096
2006	432 034	+11,9% ▲	357 733	74 301	3 167
2007	675 141	+56,3% ▲	534 796	140 345	5 050
2008	685 408	+1,5% ▲	561 649	123 760	4 832
2009	581 555	−15,2% ▼	477 507	104 048	3 499
2010	664 184	+14,2% ▲	510 314	153 870	4 416
2011	833 780	+25,5% ▲	594 087	239 693	5 150
2012	1 000 753	+20,0% ▲	679 920	320 833	≈5 800
2013	1 210 388	+20,1% ▲	799 288	339 609	≈6 380
2014	1 404 238	+16,0% ▲	964 887	364 075	≈7023
2015	1 239 212	-11,8% ▼	990 868	248 344	no data
2021	1 827 951	+57,0% ▲	1 683 432	144 519	8 227

== Accidents and incidents ==
- On 26 January 2008, an S7 Airlines Airbus A319 landed on the taxiway by mistake. There were no injuries or damage.
- On 26 May 2008, an Antonov An-12 operated by Moskovia Airlines crashed shortly after takeoff when trying an emergency landing. All nine crew members on board died.
- On 17 July 2015, an An-12BK of the Russian Air Force registered RF-94291 diverted to Chelyabinsk Airport after flying into severe thunderstorm and hail. Three out of four engines failed. The aircraft landed on the grass outside the runway and sustained substantial damage. There were no injuries.

== Miscellaneous facts ==
- An NDB beacon transmits on 412 kHz.

== See also ==
- Chelyabinsk Shagol Airport
- List of the busiest airports in Russia
- List of the busiest airports in the former USSR
