= Alexei Leonov Kemerovo International Airport =

Airport in Russia

Kemerovo International Airport
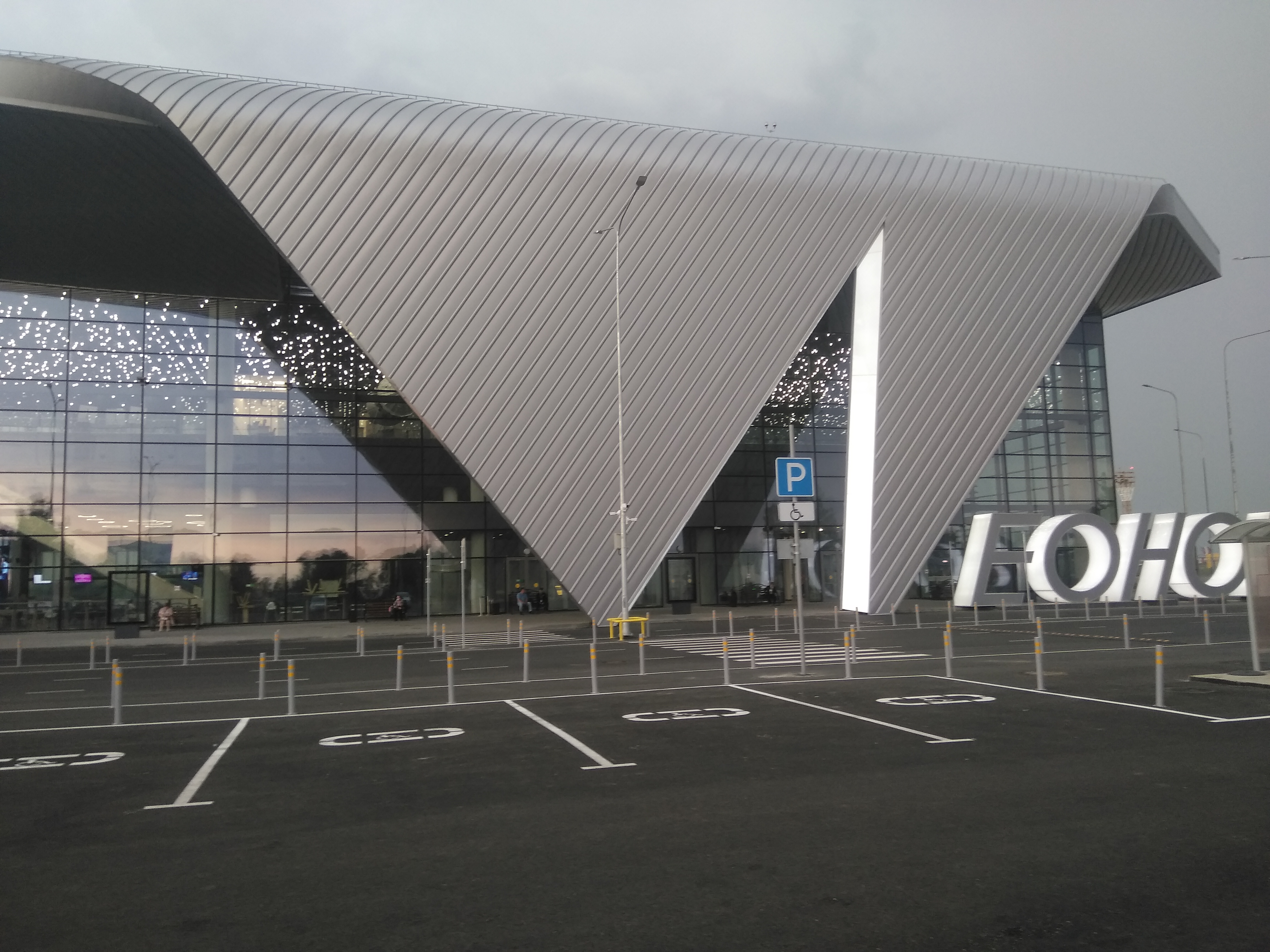
- New Kemerovo Airport Terminal, opened in 2021
- IATA: KEJ; ICAO: UNEE

Summary
- Airport type: Public
- Operator: Novaport
- Serves: Kemerovo
- Location: Kemerovo, Russia
- Elevation AMSL: 863 ft (263 m)
- Coordinates: 55°16′18″N 86°6′36″E
- Website: AirKem.ru

Map
- Location of airport in Kemerovo Oblast

Runways
Direction	Length		Surface
Direction	ft	m	Surface
05/23	10,500	3,200	Concrete
Closed	8,700	2,650	Asphalt

Kemerovo International Airport (Russian: Международный Аэропорт Кемерово) (IATA: KEJ, ICAO: UNEE), also known as Alexei Leonov Airport, is one of 2 major airports in Kemerovo Oblast (Russian: Кемеровская область, Kemerovskaya oblast) in Russia, located 10 km southeast of Kemerovo. It is a civilian airfield serving medium-sized airliners, but large enough to be used for military purposes.

== Gallery ==
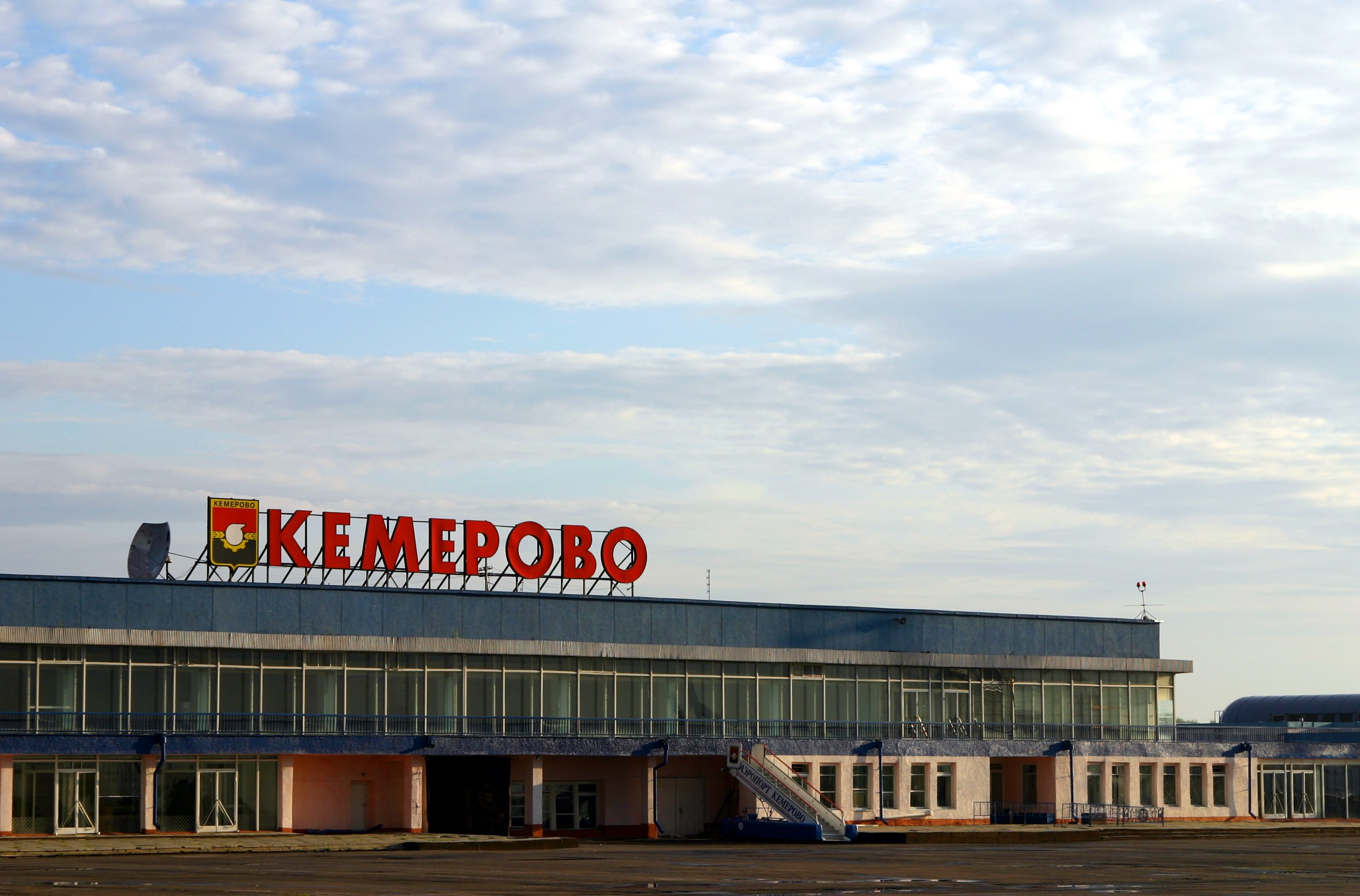
Old terminal before refurbishment

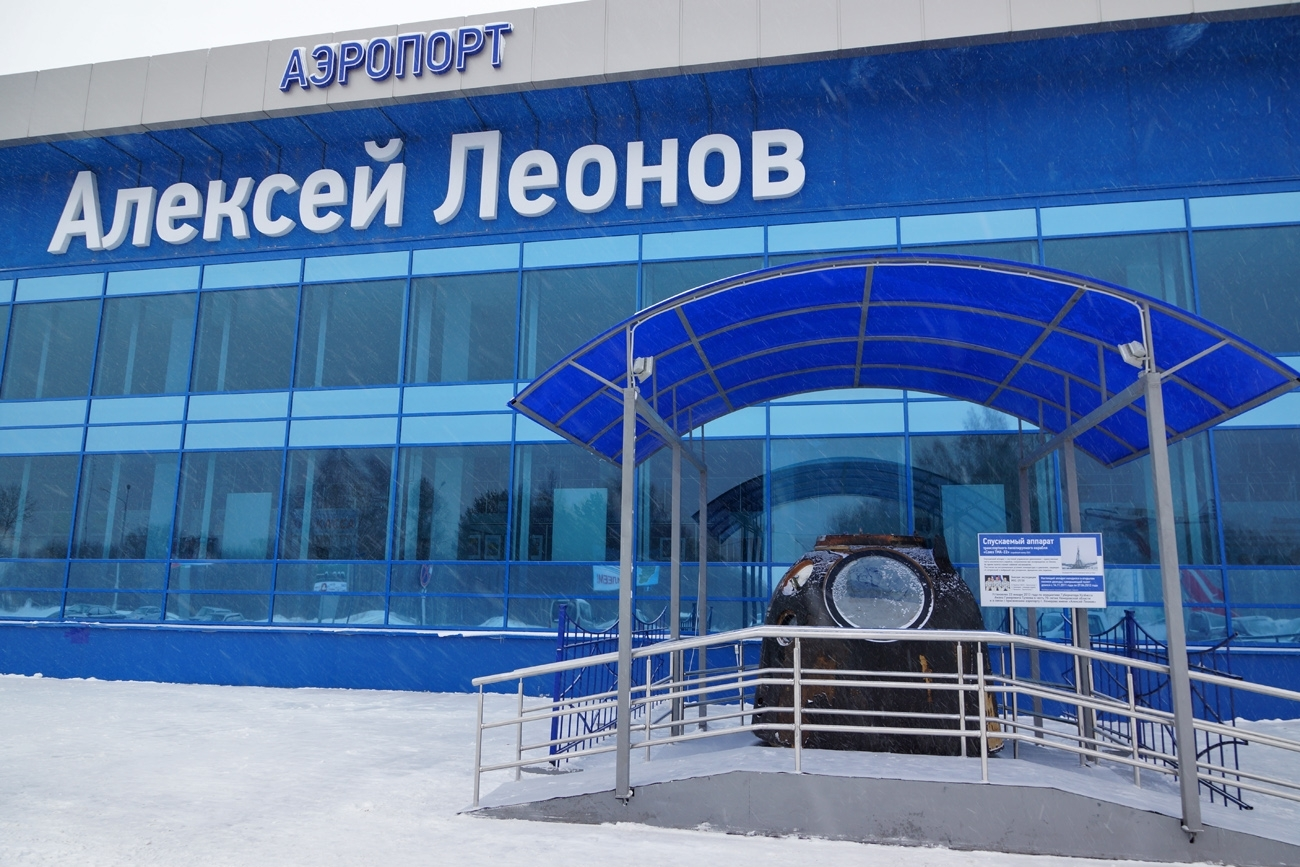
Old terminal entrance after refurbishment

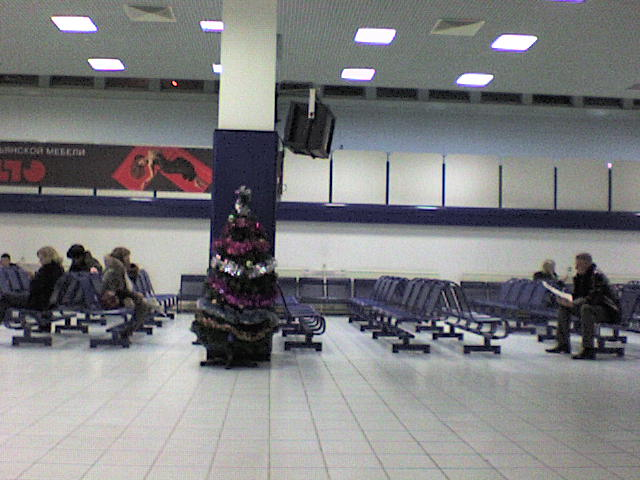
Old international terminal waiting area interior

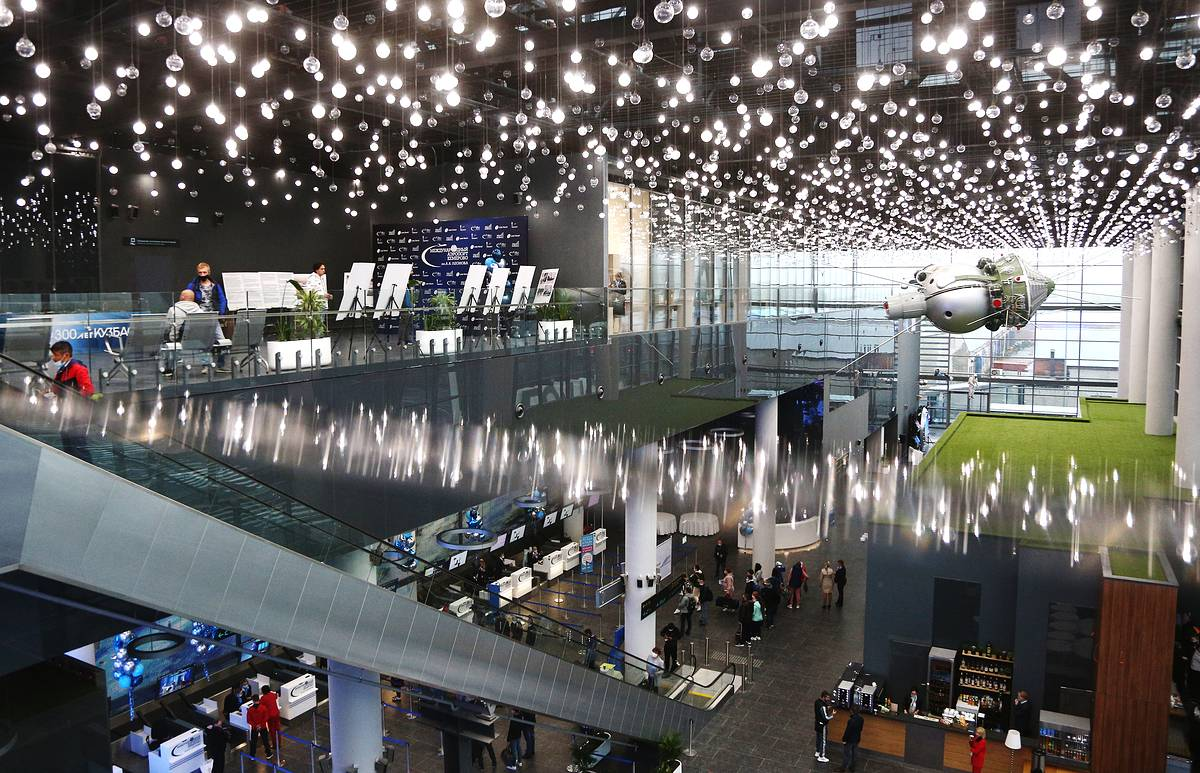
New terminal check-in zone interior

== Airlines and destinations ==
Airlines	Destinations
Aeroflot	Moscow–Sheremetyevo
KrasAvia	Krasnoyarsk–International
Nordwind Airlines	Kazan, Saint Petersburg, Sochi
Red Wings Airlines	Chita, Ulan-Ude, Yekaterinburg
S7 Airlines	Moscow-Domodedovo, Novosibirsk
Ural Airlines	Seasonal: Sochi

== Statistics ==
=== Annual Traffic ===
Annual Passenger Traffic

Year	Passengers	% Change
2011	365,2 ▲	
2012	383,1 ▲	+4,7
2013	485,6 ▲	+21,1
2014	464,7 ▼	-4,5
2015	347,4 ▼	-33,8
2016	268,6 ▼	−29,2
2017	398,0 ▲	+32,5
2018	494,3 ▲	+19,5
2019	512,9 ▲	+3,7
2020	297,2 ▼	−72,6

== See also ==
- Alexei Leonov, namesake and cosmonaut, first person to walk in space
- List of airports in Russia
