= Khrabrovo Airport =

Main airport in Kaliningrad, Russia

Khrabrovo Kaliningrad Airport

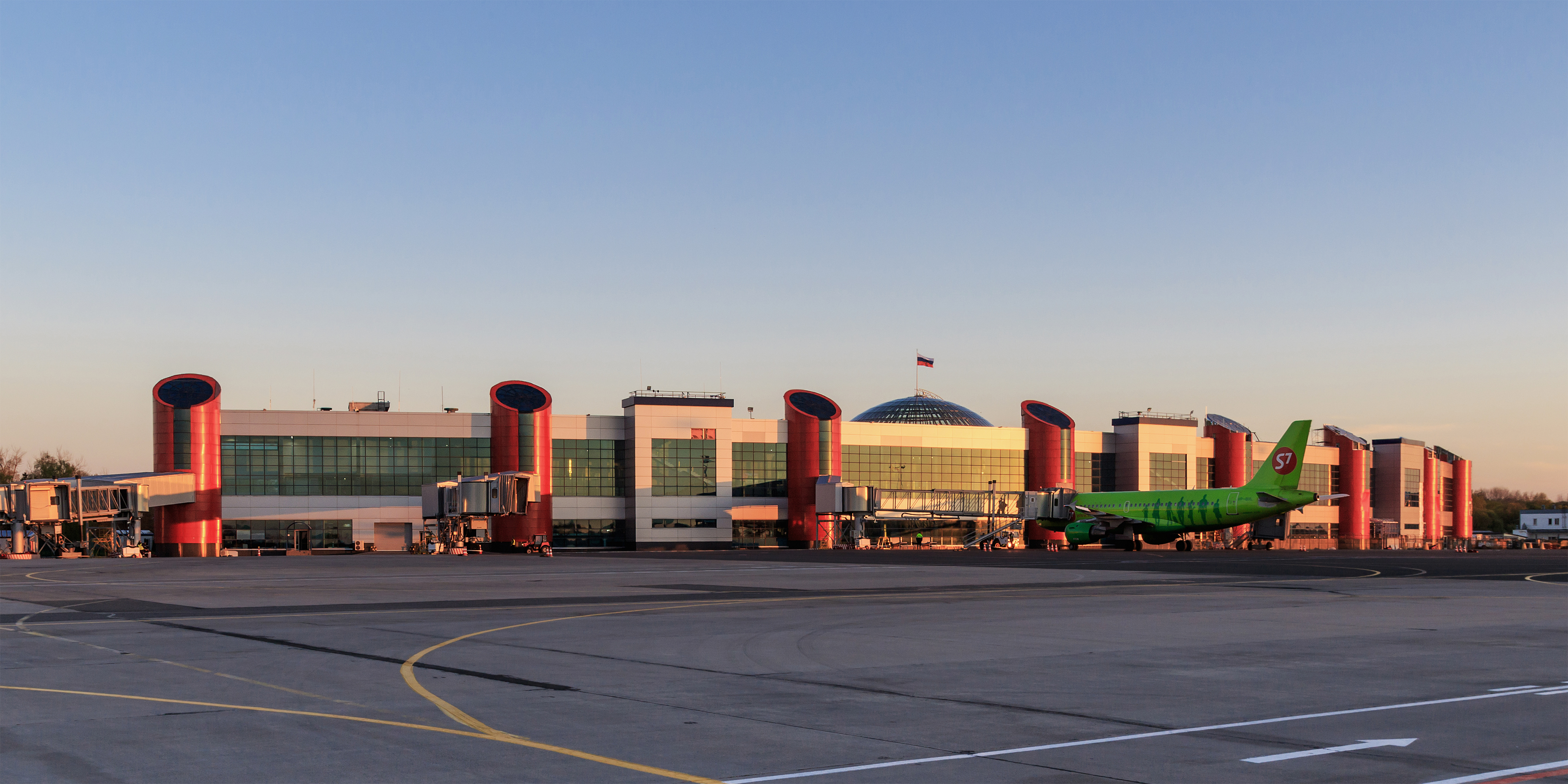
- IATA: KGD; ICAO: UMKK

Summary
- Airport type: Public/military
- Owner: Roman Trotsenko through Novaport
- Operator: Khrabrovo airport (JSC)
- Serves: Kaliningrad
- Location: Kaliningrad, Russia
- Elevation AMSL: 42 ft (13 m)
- Coordinates: 54°53′24″N 20°35′33″E
- Website: kgd.aero

Map
- Location of the airport in Kaliningrad Location in Russia Location in the Baltic Sea Region

Runways
Direction	Length		Surface
Direction	ft	m	Surface
06/24	10,990	3,350	Concrete

Statistics (2021)
- Passengers: 3,910,846
- Passenger change 17-18: ▲20.13%
- Source: Kaliningrad International Airport

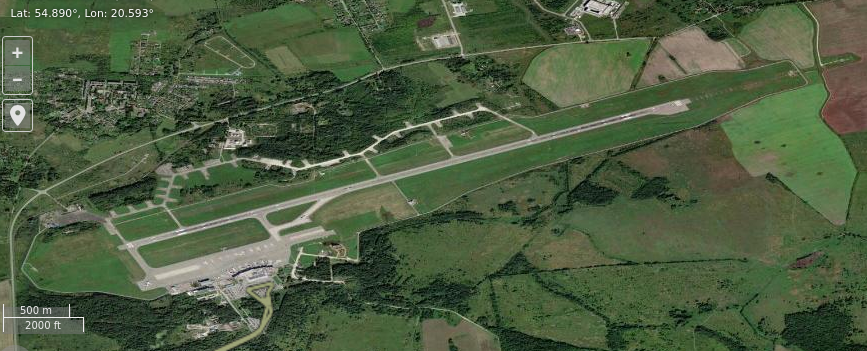
Satellite imagery of Khrabrovo Airport

Khrabrovo Airport (Russian: Аэропорт Храброво) (IATA: KGD, ICAO: UMKK), also appearing in historical documents as Powunden Airfield, is the airport of Kaliningrad, located 24 kilometers (15 mi) north of the city near the village of Khrabrovo. While it mostly serves scheduled domestic destinations, part of it is still a military base of the Russian Navy. As of 2025 it is the ninth-busiest airport in Russia, 18th-busiest in Post-Soviet states as well as one of the 100 busiest airports in Europe.

The base is home to the 398th Independent Air Transport Squadron of the 132nd Composite Aviation Division of the Baltic Fleet along with the Special Purpose Aviation Detachment Kaliningrad of the Russian National Guard.

== History ==
In 1922, the joint Russian–German venture Deruluft started flights on the first scheduled international route, from Königsberg (Devau airport) to Moscow. During World War II, the airfield was taken over for military use. After the war, the airport was transferred to the Civil Air Fleet of the USSR in 1945, but military aircraft continued to be based at the airfield.

In the 1950s, Khrabrovo was a major operating location for Ilyushin Il-28 (Beagle) tactical bombers, and at least one MiG-15 (Fagot) was observed at the airfield. At this time it was known as Kaliningrad/Powunden Airfield.

By the 1960s, the airfield was regaining its use for civil air transport, and a Joint Air Squadron was formed in 1961. The use of "Kaliningrad/Powunden" by Western intelligence ceased after July 1962 and the airfield became known as "Khrabrovo". At that time, the runway was listed as having a length of 1,920 m (6,290 ft) with alert aprons and 20 hardstands, but no aircraft were observed.

In 1977, the first Tupolev Tu-134 operations began, followed by the construction of a passenger terminal in 1979. Tupolev Tu-154 service began in 1988.

In 1992, the enterprise separated from Vnukovo Production association and became an independent entity. The following year, the first scheduled international flights began. The air enterprise was renamed "Kaliningrad Avia" in 1997, but fell into receivership in 2001. The airport changed ownership the following year and became a joint stock company. In 2004, the runway, apron, and navigation facilities were rebuilt. The new air enterprise was renamed KD Avia in 2005, with the new terminal opened in 2007. In 2009, KD Avia airlines ceased operation.

=== FIFA-2018 re-construction ===
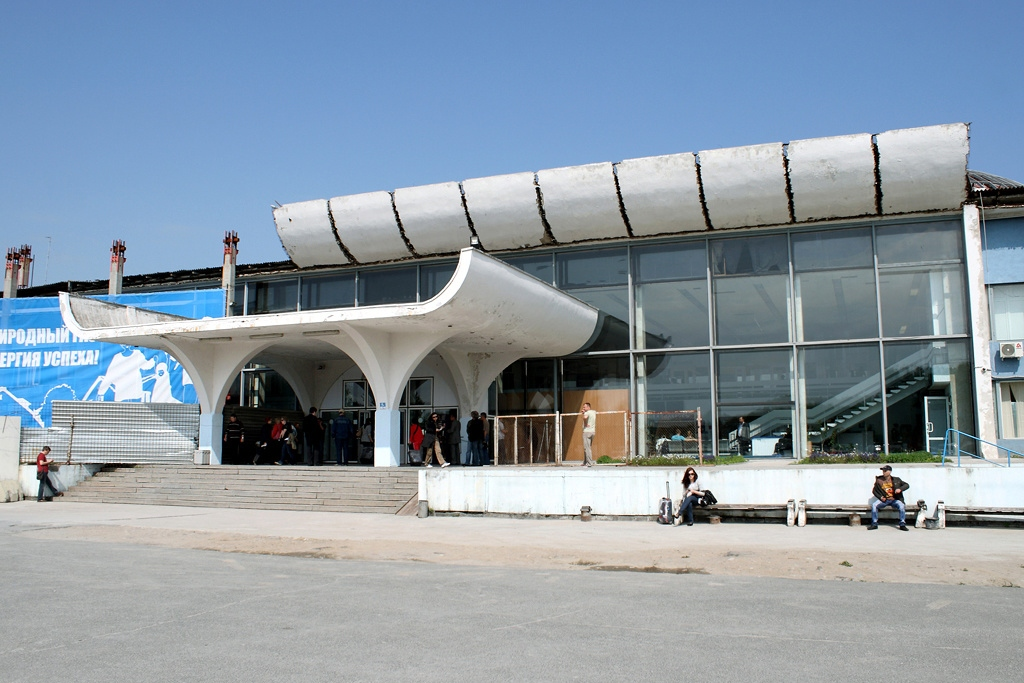
Airport's terminal entrance being partially demolished and reconstructed

In July 2016, Novaport bought the Khrabrovo Airport from Aeroinvest. As part of Russia's preparations to host the 2018 FIFA World Cup, in July 2017, a new terminal was put into operation. In addition, the airport infrastructure was modernized and this included the lengthening and reinforcement of the runway, the installation of new radiotechnical, lighting, and weather forecast equipment and construction of new aircraft parking spaces and a high-speed taxiway.

The reconstruction of the passenger terminal and the runway enlargement were officially finished on 27 April 2018.

== Airlines and destinations ==
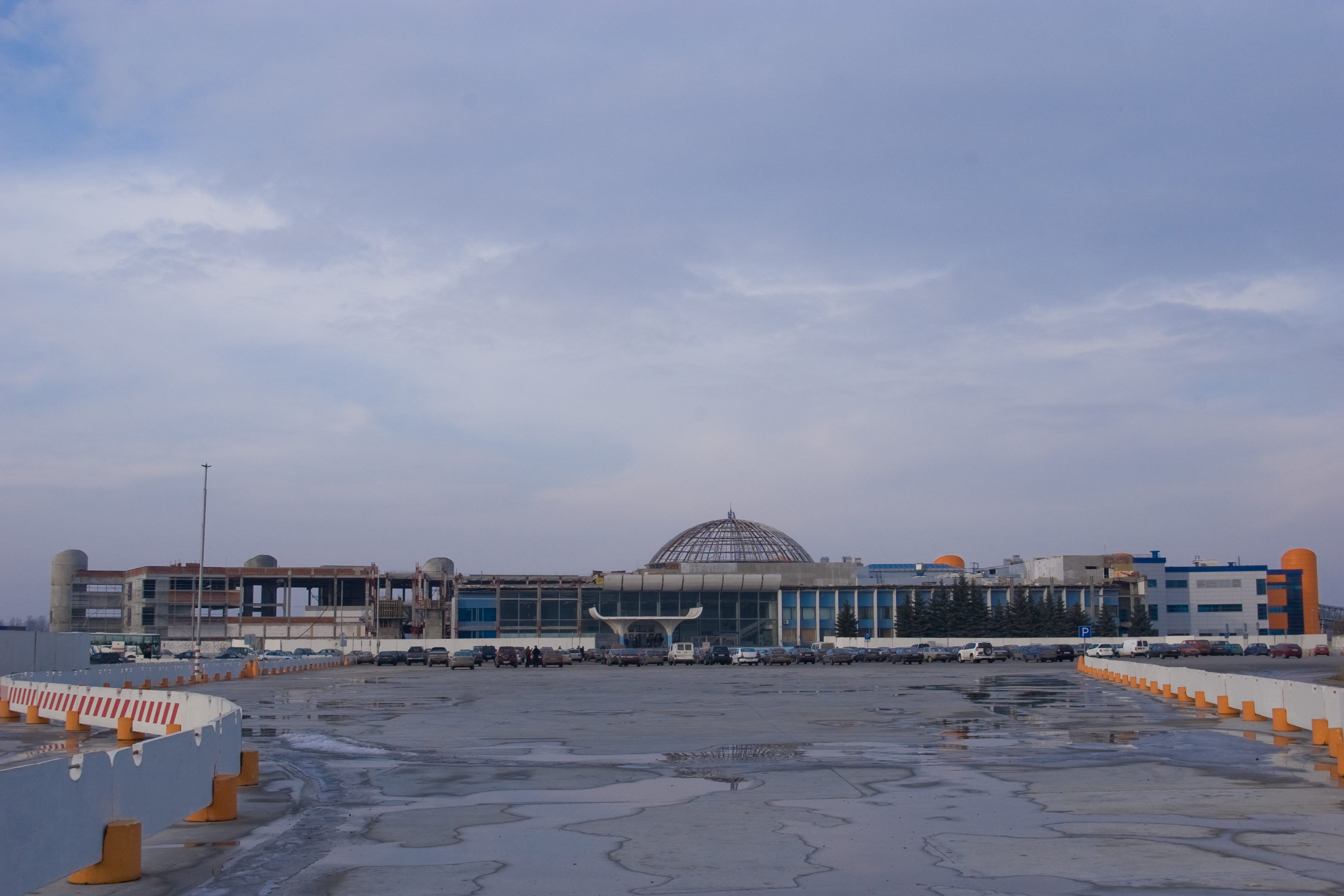
The old terminal under reconstruction and merging with new terminal

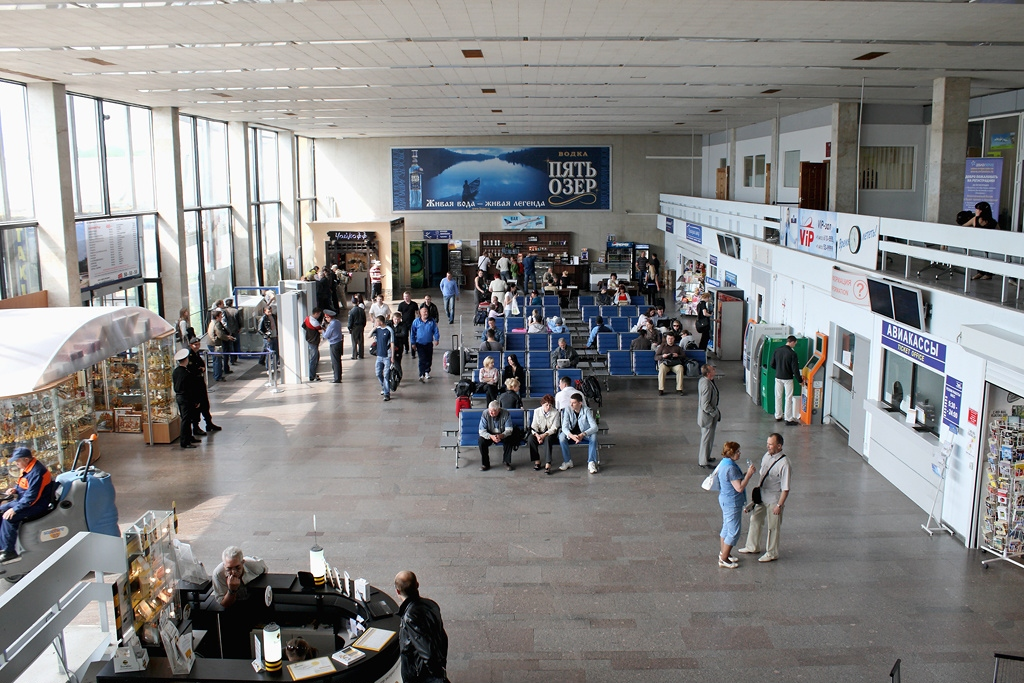
Interior of the old terminal

Airlines	Destinations
Aeroflot	Moscow–Sheremetyevo; Seasonal: Cheboksary
Air Cairo	Seasonal charter: Sharm El Sheikh
AlMasria Universal Airlines	Seasonal charter: Sharm El Sheikh
Azimuth	Pskov
Belavia	Minsk
Ikar	Izhevsk; Seasonal: Ivanovo, Kirov, Volgograd
Nordwind Airlines	Kazan, Moscow–Sheremetyevo, Nizhny Novgorod, Orenburg, Perm, Saint Petersburg, Samara, Tyumen, Ufa
Pobeda	Moscow–Sheremetyevo, Moscow–Vnukovo, Saint Petersburg, Yekaterinburg
Rossiya Airlines	Moscow–Sheremetyevo, Saint Petersburg; Seasonal: Apatity/Kirovsk
S7 Airlines	Moscow–Domodedovo, Novosibirsk
Shirak Avia	Seasonal: Yerevan
Severstal Air Company	Cherepovets, Petrozavodsk
Smartavia	Arkhangelsk–Talagi, Chelyabinsk, Moscow–Sheremetyevo, Murmansk, Saint Petersburg; Seasonal: Syktyvkar
Southwind Airlines	Seasonal: Antalya
Ural Airlines	Moscow–Domodedovo, Saint Petersburg, Yekaterinburg

== Statistics ==
=== Annual traffic ===
Annual passenger traffic
Year	Passengers	% change
2010	1,024,000	Steady
2011	1,229,017	▲20%
2012	1,188,422	▼3.3%
2013	1,314,046	▲10.6%
2014	1,460,054	▲11.1%
2015	1,542,360	▲5.6%
2016	1,570,854	▲1.8%
2017	1,780,000	▲13.9%
2018	2,149,413	▲20.13%
2019	2,369,860	▲10.3%
2020	2,117,931	▼10.6%
2021	3,910,846	▲84.7%
2022	3,742,387	▼4.3%
2023	4,300,625	▲14.9%
2024	4,814,395	▲11.9%

== Ground transportation ==
The bus line No. 244э connects the airport with the Kaliningrad Main Bus/Railway Station.

== See also ==
- List of the busiest airports in Russia
- List of the busiest airports in Europe
- List of the busiest airports in the former USSR
- List of military airbases in Russia
