= List of airports in Tajikistan =

Airports in Tajikistan

This is a list of airports in Tajikistan, grouped by type and sorted by location.

Tajikistan, officially the Republic of Tajikistan, is a mountainous landlocked country in Central Asia. Afghanistan borders it to the south, Uzbekistan to the west, Kyrgyzstan to the north, and People's Republic of China to the east. Tajikistan also lies adjacent to Pakistan, separated by the narrow Wakhan Corridor. Its capital city is Dushanbe.

== Airports ==
Airport names shown in bold have scheduled passenger service on commercial airlines.

Location served	Province	ICAO	IATA	Airport name	Coordinates
Public airports
Ayni	Sughd			Ayni Airport	39°24′14″N 068°31′26″E
Dushanbe	RRP	UTDD	DYU	**Dushanbe International Airport**	38°32′36″N 068°49′30″E
Garm (Gharm)	RRP			Garm Airport	39°00′14″N 070°17′29″E
Isfara	Sughd			Isfara Airport	40°07′18″N 070°39′55″E
Khorog (Khorugh)	GBAO	UTOD		**Khorog Airport**	37°30′08″N 071°30′48″E
Khujand	Sughd	UTDL	LBD	**Khujand Airport**	40°12′55″N 069°41′40″E
Kulob (Kulyab)	Khatlon	UTDK	TJU	**Kulob Airport**	37°59′00″N 069°48′00″E
Murgab (Murghab)	GBAO			Murgab Airport	38°11′25″N 074°01′29″E
Penjikent (Panjakent)	Sughd			Penjikent Airport	39°29′02″N 067°36′12″E
Bokhtar	Khatlon	UTDT	KQT	**Bokhtar International Airport**	37°51′44″N 068°51′46″E
Military airports
Farkhor (Parkhar)	Khatlon			Farkhor Air Base (Farkhor-Ayni Air Base)	37°28′11″N 069°22′51″E
Gissar (Hisor)	RRP			Gissar Air Base	38°30′44″N 068°40′20″E
Moskovskiy / Pyandzh (Panj)	Khatlon			Moskovskiy Pyandzh Air Base	37°38′25″N 069°38′47″E

== See also ==
- List of airports by ICAO code: U#UT - Tajikistan, Turkmenistan, Uzbekistan
- Transport in Tajikistan
- Wikipedia: WikiProject Aviation/Airline destination lists: Asia#Tajikistan
