= Tajik Air Force =

Air warfare branch of Tajikistan's military

Tajik Air Force and Air Defence
- Военно-воздушные силы и противовоздушная оборона Таджикистана (Russian); Қувваҳои ҳавоӣ ва мудофиаи Тоҷикистон (Tajik)
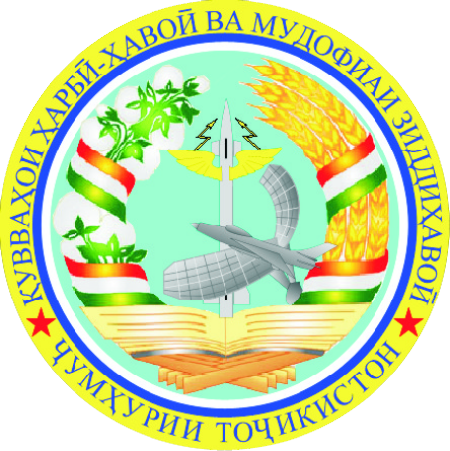
- Emblem of the Tajik Air Force and Air Defence
- Founded: 1994; 32 years ago
- Country: Tajikistan
- Type: Air force
- Role: Aerial warfare Aerial defence
- Size: 1 squadron
- Part of: Tajik Armed Forces
- Headquarters: Dushanbe
- Anniversaries: 23 February
- Engagements: Tajik Civil War

Commanders
- Commander of the Air Force and Air Defense Forces: Shamsiddin Sobirzoda

Insignia
- Roundel

Aircraft flown
- Helicopter: Mil Mi-8
- Attack helicopter: Mil Mi-24
- Trainer: Aero L-39
- Transport: Antonov An-26

The Tajik Air and Air Defense Forces (Russian: Военно-воздушные силы и противовоздушная оборона Таджикистана; Tajik: Қувваҳои ҳавоӣ ва мудофиаи Тоҷикистон, romanized: Quvvahoi Havoī va Mudofiai Tojikiston) is the aerial military service branch of the Armed Forces of the Republic of Tajikistan, which currently consists of 20 helicopters. The force engages in search and rescue missions, as well as military raids.

== History ==
The Air Force was established the same year as the National Army. The Air Defense Forces were established in 1994. As a result of military reforms and the common goals and objectives, in 2005 the two forces were merged.

In 2007, it consisted of sixteen combat and support helicopters, prior to which the country had relied on the Russian Air Force for protection. Tajikistan is part of the Joint CIS Air Defence System, and its airspace is monitored by Russia. Currently, no air defense capabilities exist, with the exception of a few surface-to-air missiles that were transferred to the Tajik Army. Russia opposes Tajik's ambition of a more capable air force, and Moscow has consistently declined to supply fighter aircraft or assist modernizing its military air traffic control system. Russia's assessment is that its own air force contingent at Gissar and in Kazakhstan is sufficient to ensure adequate security for Tajikistan. Tajikistan's modest number of combat-capable helicopters are primarily tasked with search and rescue and airlift duties; they have been occasionally deployed to attack opposition forces. Dushanbe receives minimal foreign military aid and has no funding available for procurement of fixed-wing combat aircraft. Moscow bolstered Tajikistan's rotary wing capability in 2006 by providing six Mi-8 and Mi-24 attack helicopters. It also provided four L-39 training aircraft.

India's defence ministry signed a basing agreement with Tajikistan that gives it access to Tajik's Ayni Air Base that is also shared with the Russians. Under this trilateral agreement, the runway was extended, perimeter fencing erected and aircraft hangars built. Since 1985, this decaying airbase was used by the former Soviet Union during its Afghan war, and after renovation, it was officially opened in September 2010. India contributed 70 million dollars toward the renovation and sent specialists to help with the work. The airfield, located some 20 kilometers west of Dushanbe, now has state-of-the-art navigational and defense technology. Its runway was also extended to 3,200 meters so that all types of aircraft can land there.

== Structure ==
Tajik Air and Air Defense Forces consist of

- Independent Helicopter Squadron (Ayni, Dushanbe, Bokhtar and Khujand airfields)
- 536th Anti-Aircraft Missile Regiment (Dushanbe)
- 45th Radio Engineering Battalion (Dushanbe)
- 97th Anti-Aircraft Missile Brigade (Bokhtar)
- 770th Anti-Aircraft Missile Regiment (Isfara)
- 74th Anti-Aircraft Missile Regiment (Khujand)
- 69th Anti-Aircraft Missile Regiment (Kulyab)
- 42nd Anti-Aircraft Missile Regiment (Dushanbe)

== Aircraft ==
=== Current inventory ===
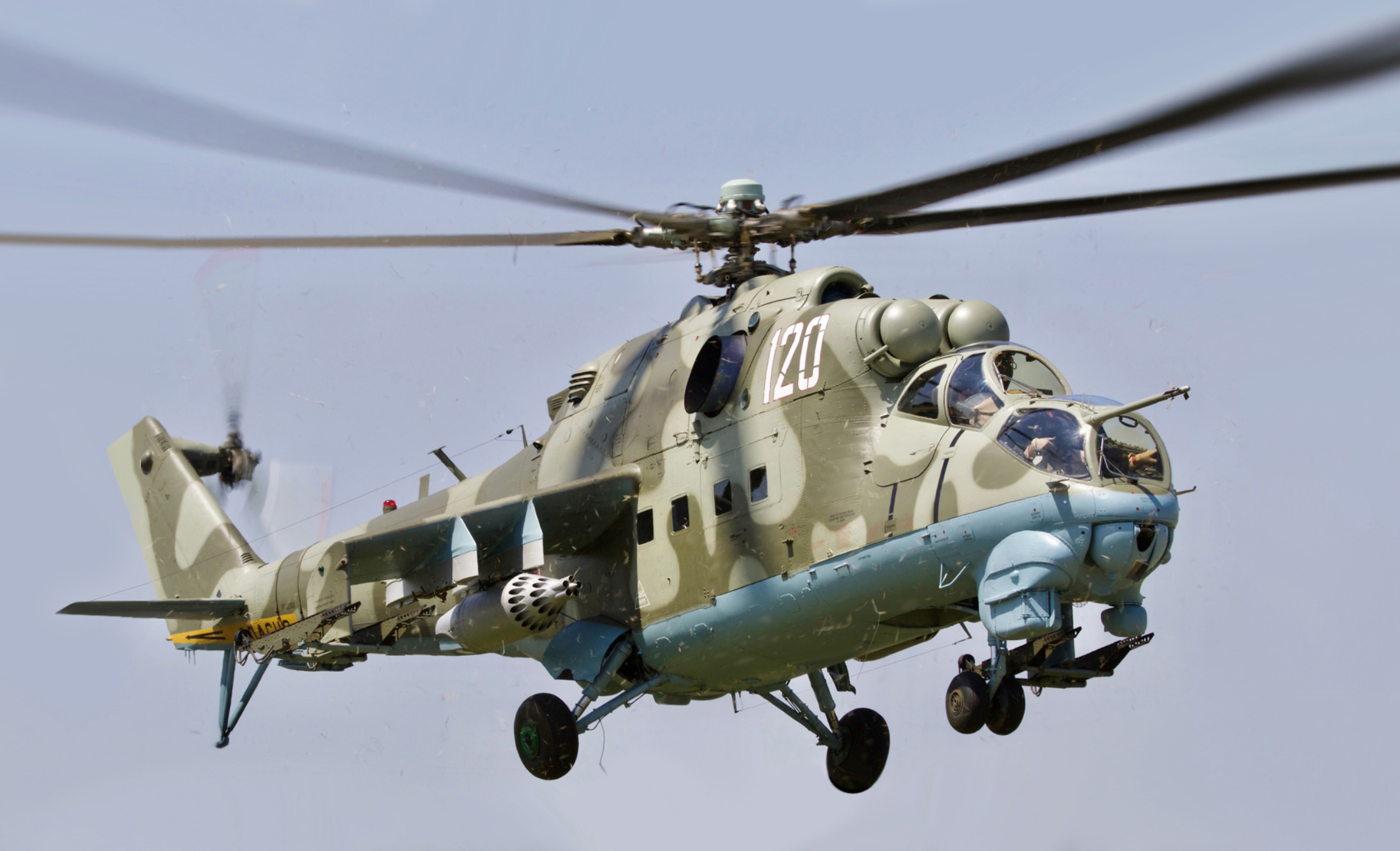
The Mil Mi-24, as pictured, is one of two types of helicopters seen in use by the Tajik Air Force.

| Aircraft | Origin | Type | Variant | In service | Notes |
Transport
| Antonov An-26 | Soviet Union | Transport | | 1 | |
| Tupolev Tu-134 | Soviet Union | Transport/VIP | Tu-134AK | 1 | |
Helicopters
| Mil Mi-8 | Soviet Union | Transport | | 14 | |
| Mil Mi-24 | Soviet Union | Attack | Mi-24V(Mil Mi-35) | 6 | |
Trainer aircraft
| Aero L-39 | Czechoslovakia | Light attack / Trainer | | 4 | |

== See also ==
- Chief of Staff of the Tajik Air Force
