= East Air =

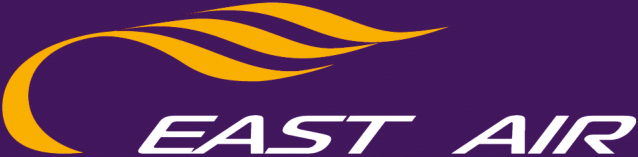
IATA	ICAO	Call sign
EG	ETJ	EAST TAJIK
- Founded: 2007
- Ceased operations: 2014
- Hubs: Kulob Airport
- Fleet size: 4
- Destinations: Russia
- Headquarters: Qurghonteppa, Tajikistan
- Website: www.eastair.tj

East Air was a privately owned airline based in Qurghonteppa, Tajikistan. The airline operated regular flights from Qurghonteppa and Kulob to Russia. In October 2014 the Tajikistan General Authority of Civil Aviation revoked East Air's Air Operator's Certificate (AOC) and the airline went out of business.

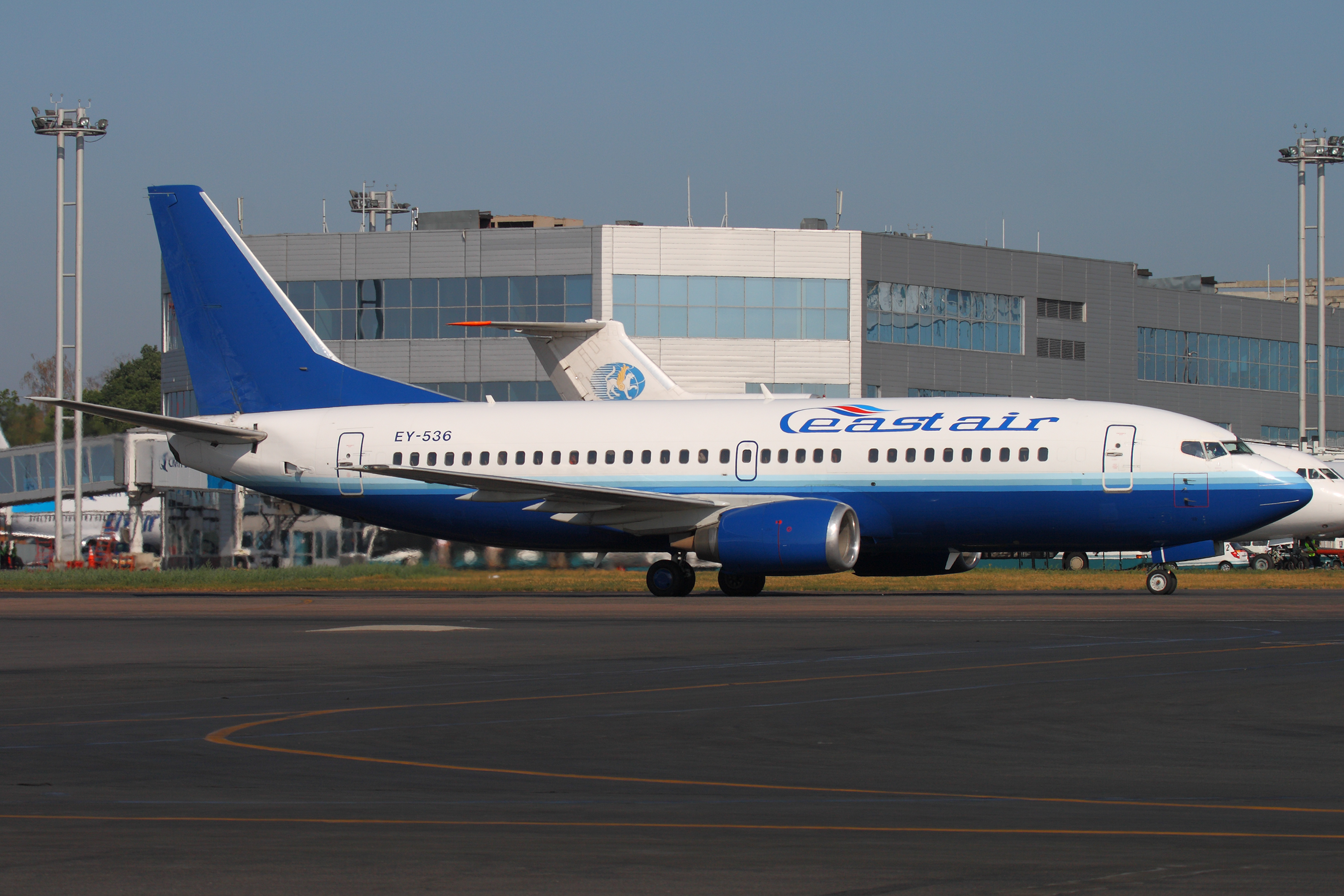
East Air Boeing 737-300

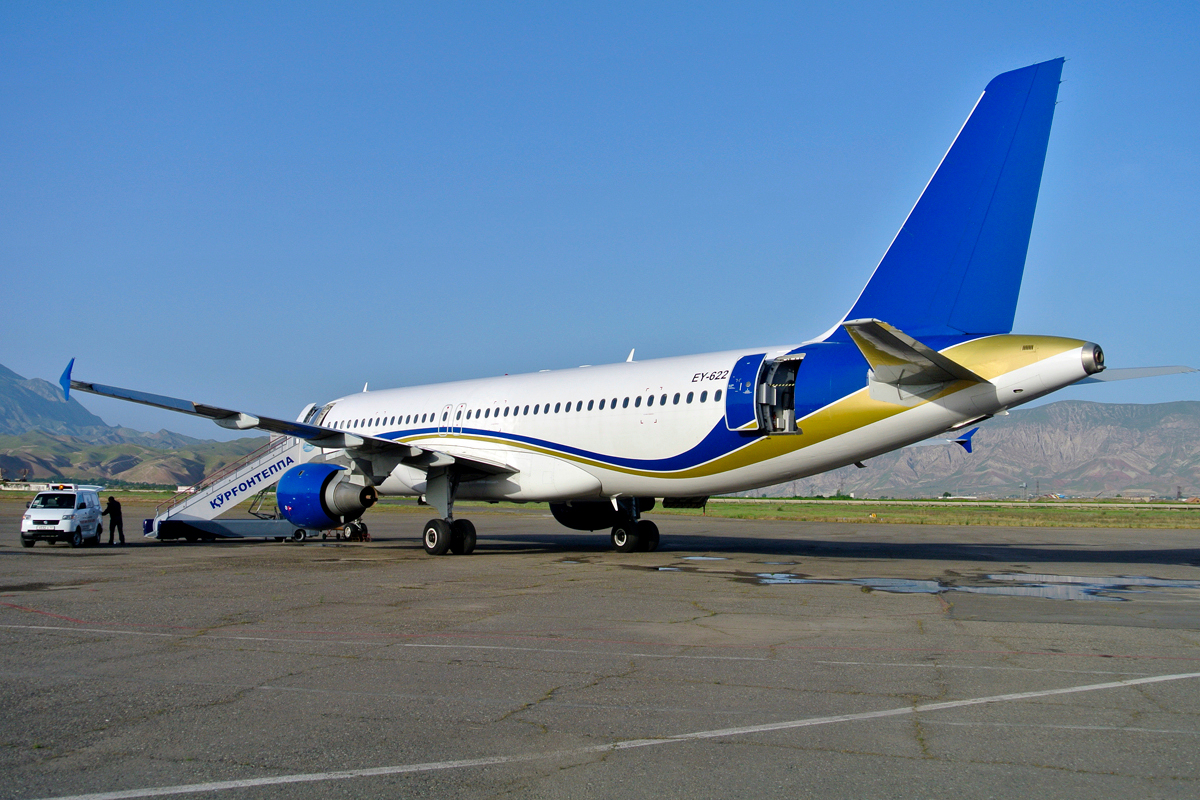
East Air Airbus A320

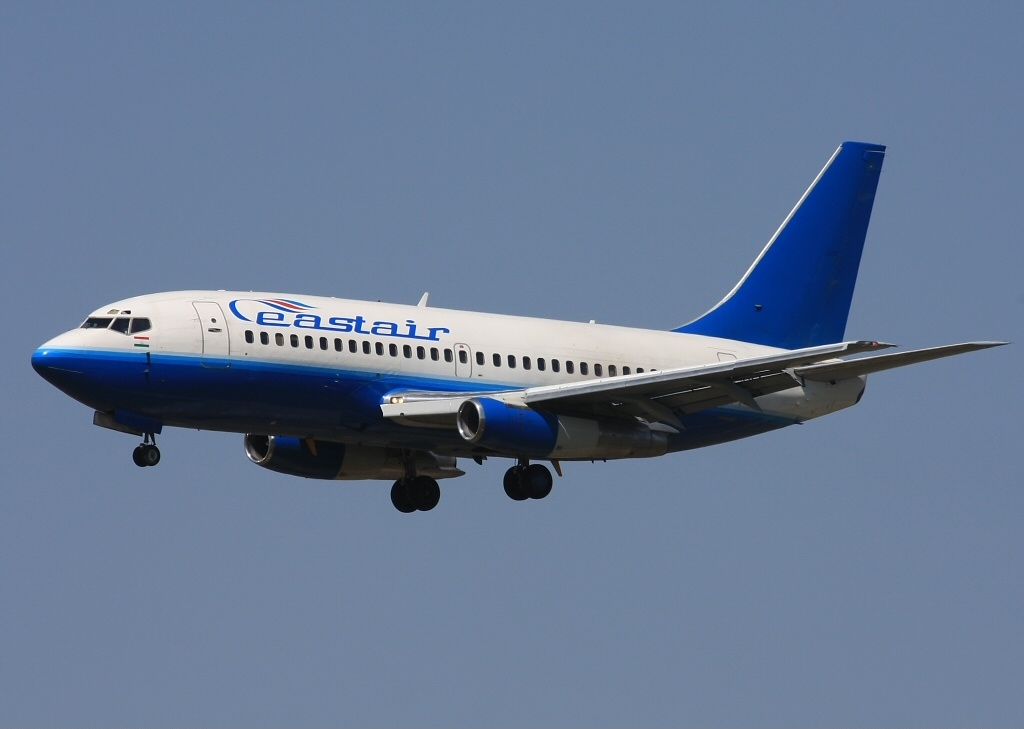
East Air Boeing 737-200

== Destinations ==
As of July 2013 East Air served following destinations:

=== Asia ===
Kyrgyzstan

- Bishkek – Manas International Airport

Tajikistan

- Dushanbe – Dushanbe International Airport
- Kulob – Kulob Airport
- Qurghonteppa – Qurghonteppa International Airport

=== Europe ===
Russia

- Kazan – Kazan International Airport
- Moscow – Moscow Domodedovo Airport
- Novosibirsk – Tolmachevo Airport
- Chelyabinsk – Balandino Airport
- Orenburg – Orenburg Tsentralny Airport
- Saint Petersburg – Pulkovo Airport
- Yekaterinburg – Koltsovo Airport

== Fleet ==
The East Air fleet consisted entirely of Boeing 737 and Airbus A320 aircraft (as of May 2014):

East Air Fleet
Type	In Fleet	Notes
Airbus A320-200	2
Boeing 737-300	1	Operating for Daallo Airlines
Boeing 737-400	1
Total	4
