= Kazan International Airport =

Airport in Kazan, Russia

Ğabdulla Tuqay Kazan International Airport Габдулла Тукай исемендәге Казан Аэропорты

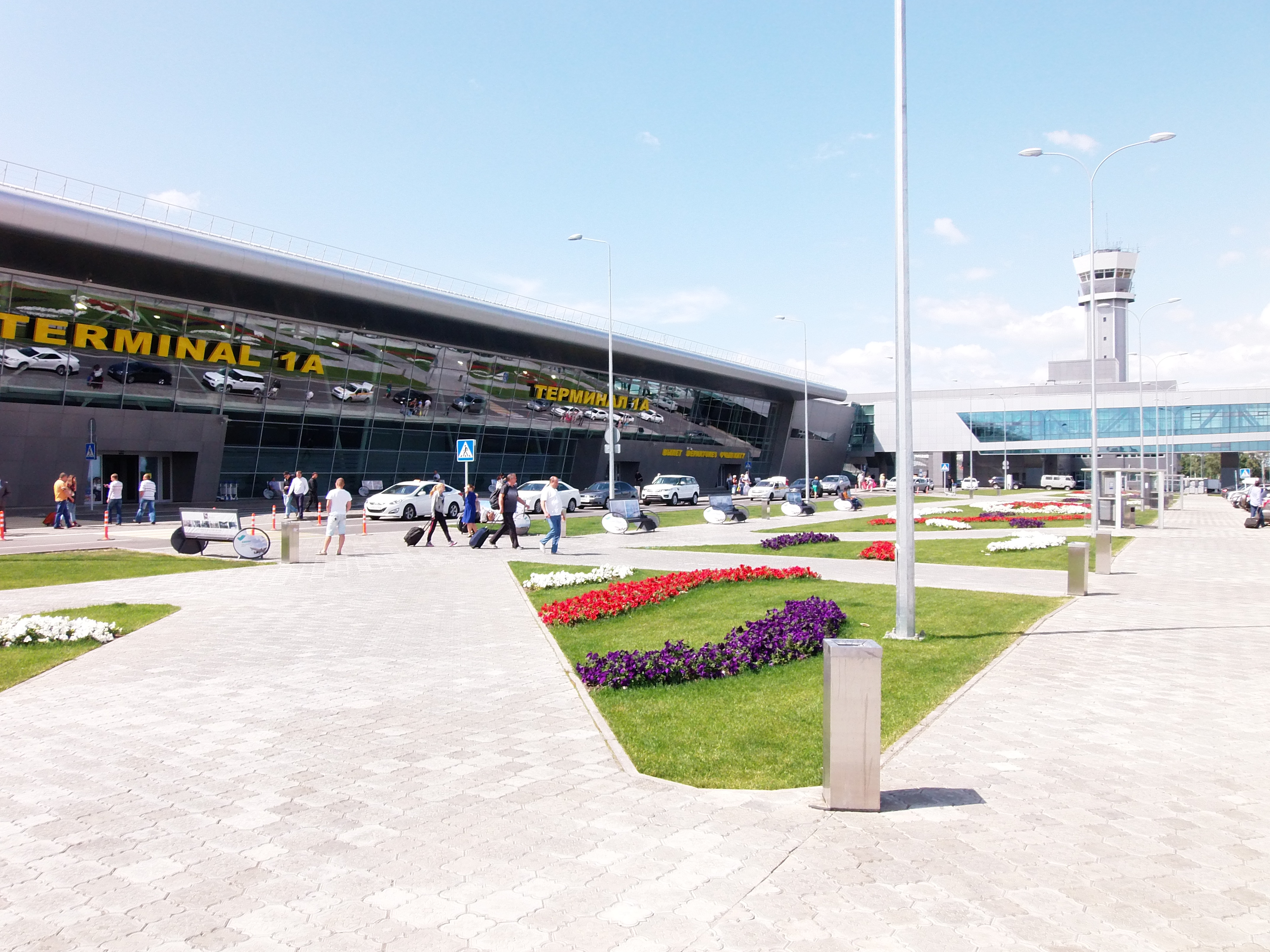
- IATA: KZN; ICAO: UWKD

Summary
- Airport type: International
- Owner: Kazan International Airport
- Operator: JSC "Kazan International Airport"
- Serves: Kazan, Russia
- Hub for: UVT Aero
- Elevation AMSL: 410 ft (120 m)
- Coordinates: 55°36′24″N 49°16′54″E
- Website: www.kazan.aero

Map
- Location of the airport in Tatarstan Location of the airport in Russia Location of the airport in Europe

Runways
Direction	Length		Surface
Direction	ft	m	Surface
11L/29R	12,218	3,724	Concrete

Statistics (2018)
- Passengers (2023): 5.000.000 https://flightmapper.io/airports/kazan-international-airport-kzn-26404
- Time zone: UTC +4
- Operating time: 7.00–24.00, all year
- Most popular international flight: Istanbul, Turkey
- Sources: Russian Federal Air Transport Agency (see also provisional 2018 statistics)

Ğabdulla Tuqay Kazan International Airport (Tatar: Казан Халыкара Аэропорты, romanized: Qazan Xalıqara Aeroportı, Russian: Международный аэропорт Казань; IATA: KZN, ICAO: UWKD) is an international airport in Russia, around 25 km southeast of Kazan. With 5.4 million passengers in 2025 it is the busiest airport in Tatarstan and Volga Federal District, as well as one of the busiest airports in Russia and the Post-Soviet States. In 2019 Airport was renamed to commemorate a Volga Tatar poet, critic, publisher, and towering figure of Tatar literature Ğabdulla Tuqay.

== History ==
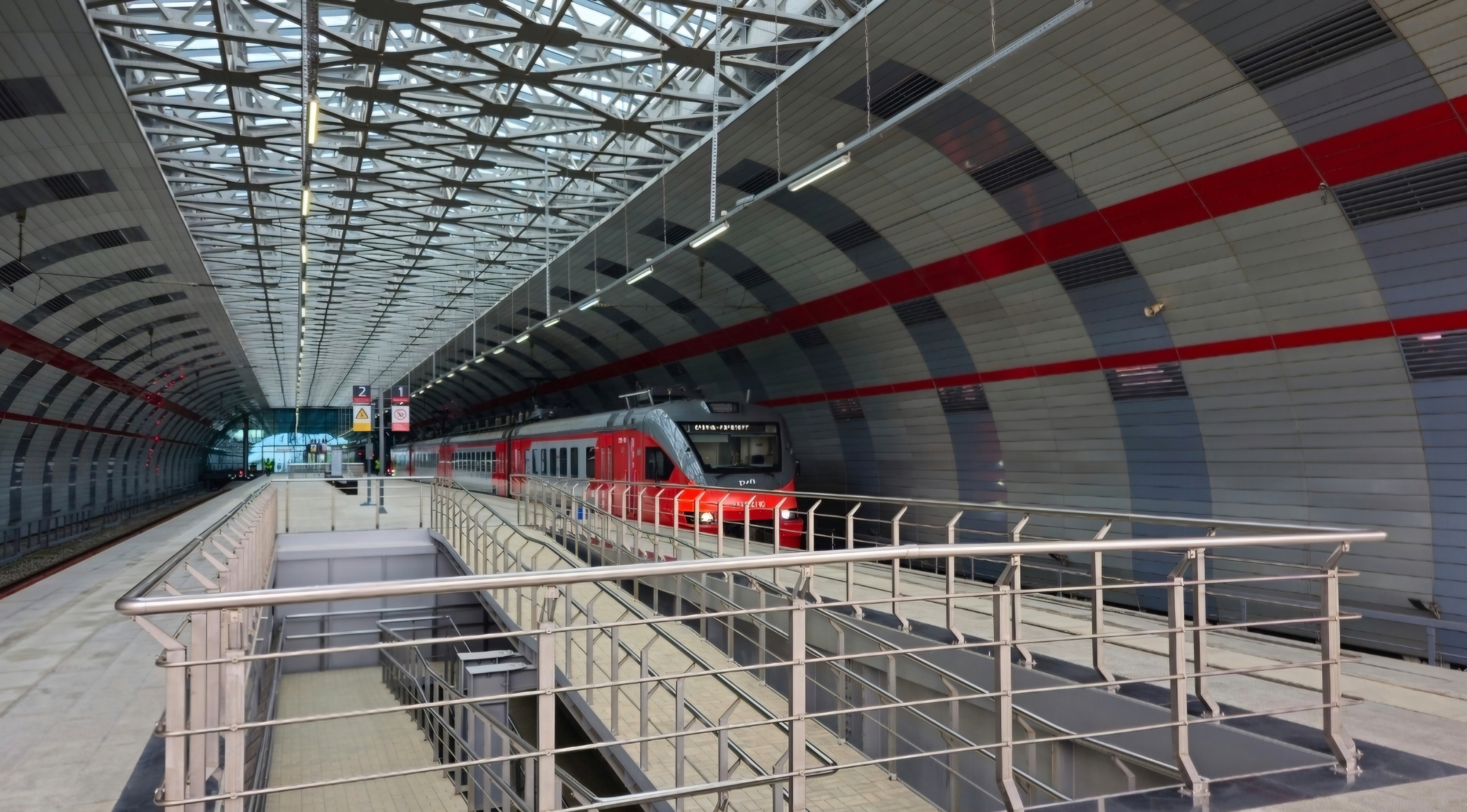
The train station adjacent to the airport

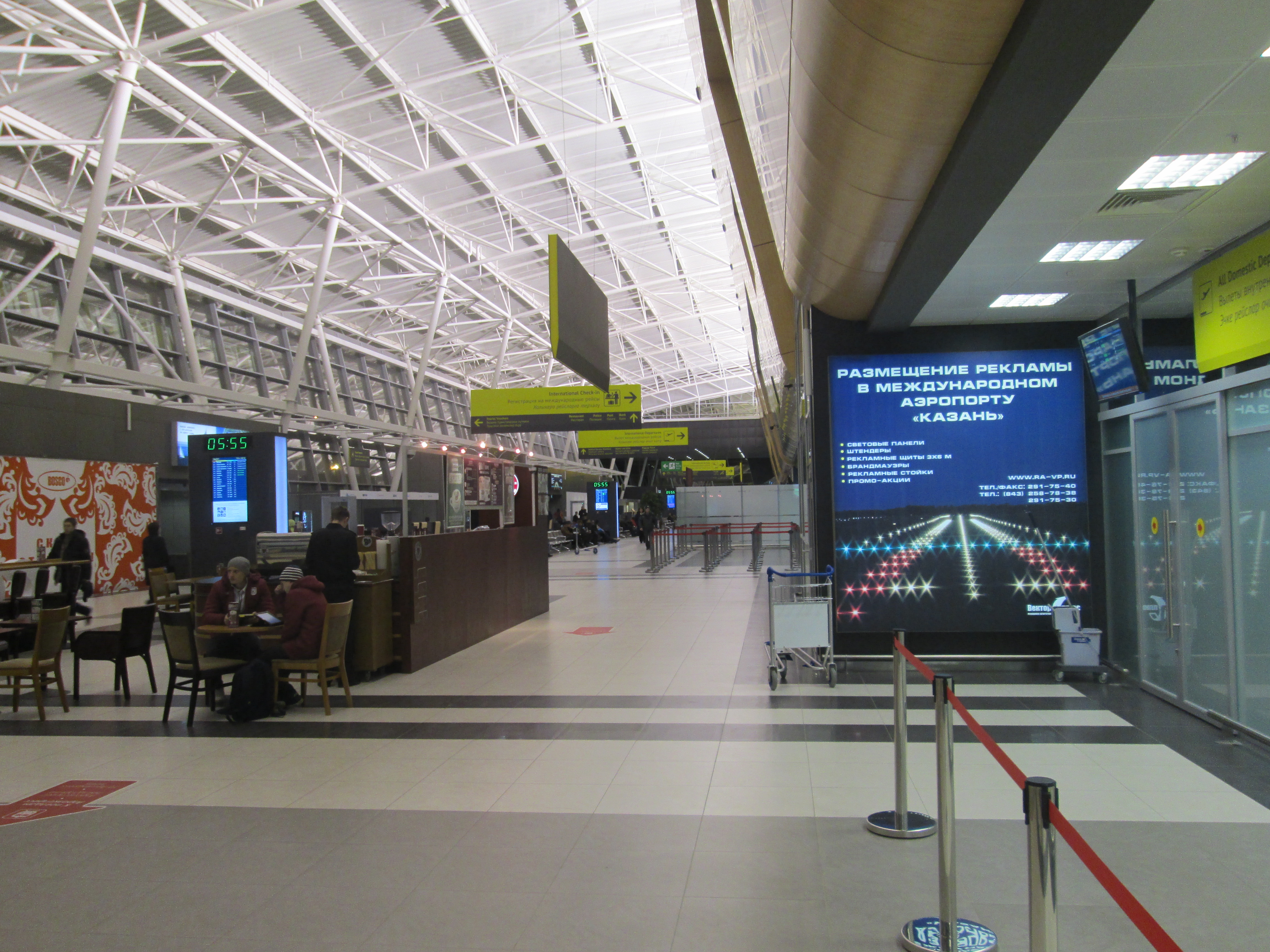
Inside Kazan Airport, departure hall

Kazan 2 was completed on 15 September 1979. On 28 September 1984, Kazan 1 (located inside the city) was shut down, and Kazan 2 was renamed Kazan Domestic Airport. On 21 February 1986, Kazan Airport gained international rank. This was a drastic announcement because the USSR Council of Ministers only rarely allowed its citizens to fly out of the USSR.

In 1991, after the fall of the Soviet Union, the Tatarstan region separated from the USSR's single Aeroflot airline and created Tatarstan Airlines. This airline didn't gain an efficient amount of investments in its 22 years of service, and its operating license was officially terminated on 31 December 2013 after a disaster.

On 26 October 1992, Kazan got its first international regular flight: Kazan – Istanbul – Kazan. This flight was (and still is) operated by Turkish Airlines and 145 annual trips are made to and from Istanbul, making it the most popular international route.

In 2008, Tatarstan's president, Mintimer Shaimiev, after winning the bid for the 2013 Summer Universiade, began creating a set of major reform projects in Kazan. Apart from repairing the streets, bringing in investments, the integrating English language, and improving the bus route system in Kazan, Shaimiev also began to completely redesign Kazan's airport. He designed the blueprints for Terminal 1A and planned out the complete refining of the airport between 2008 and 2025. Shaimiev's successor and today's president of Tatarstan, Rustam Minnikhanov, used the blueprints, which were made in 2009, to begin the construction of Terminal 1A and a complete redesign of Terminal 1 (essentially also a new reconstruction).

First, a new 3,700-meter runway was built, and edge lights were added on both of the runways. This made it possible for the airport to operate 24/7. In 2012, a new airport fire station was built. In 2012, the construction of Terminal 1A began. Later that year, Terminal 1 began its own renovation. Terminal 1A was officially opened on 7 November 2012. Terminal 1 finished renovations on 22 June 2013.

Today, the new airport has more than 30 check-in slots and seven conveyor belts. It has three separate duty-free shops, selling merchandise such as alcohol, cigars and cigarettes, chocolates. It offers popular brands such as Costa coffee. The airport can sustain around three million passengers. Further expansions and the creation of Terminal 2 will occur before the 2018 FIFA World Cup.

Following the Skytrax Airport and Airline Awards, Kazan Airport was nominated for 4 stars in 2014 and was called Russia's and CIS's best airport.

Following the opening of new air routes and an increase in flights through existing routes, the Kazan Airport reached a record of 2.5 million passengers transported in less than a year at the beginning of December 2017.

On October 15, 2026, the new Terminal B, designed for domestic flights, opened in test mode. Its capacity is 5.7 million passengers per year.

== Airlines and destinations ==
Airlines	Destinations
Aeroflot	Antalya, Krasnodar, Moscow–Sheremetyevo, Sanya, Sochi
Air Arabia	Ras Al Khaimah, Sharjah (all flights suspended until 27 March 2027)
Air Cairo	Seasonal charter: El Alamein, Sharm El Sheikh
Air Serbia	Belgrade
AlMasria Universal Airlines	Seasonal charter: Hurghada, Sharm El Sheikh
Avia Traffic Company	Bishkek
Azur Air	Seasonal charter: Antalya, Hambantota–Mattala, Nha Trang, Dalaman, Sharm El Sheikh
Belavia	Minsk
Centrum Air	Samarqand, Tashkent
China Eastern Airlines	Shanghai–Pudong
Corendon Airlines	Seasonal charter: Antalya
Etihad Airways	Seasonal: Abu Dhabi
Flydubai	Dubai–International
FlyOne	Tashkent, Yerevan
Ikar	Arkhangelsk-Talagi, Murmansk, Surgut, Ufa, Volgograd; Seasonal: Astrakhan; Seasonal charter: Nha Trang
IrAero	Baku
Nordstar Airlines	Norilsk
Nordwind Airlines	Astana, Barnaul, Bishkek, Bokhtar, Dushanbe, Fergana (begins 25 November 2026), Grozny, Irkutsk, Istanbul, Kaliningrad, Kemerovo, Khujand, Krasnodar, Krasnoyarsk–International, Kulob (begins 27 September 2026), Makhachkala, Mineralnye Vody, Moscow–Sheremetyevo, Namangan, Novokuznetsk, Omsk, Saint Petersburg, Samarqand, Sochi, Tashkent, Tomsk, Ulan-Ude, Vladikavkaz
Pegasus Airlines	Antalya
Pobeda	Antalya, Dubai-Al Maktoum, Krasnodar, Istanbul, Moscow–Sheremetyevo, Moscow–Vnukovo, Sochi, Surgut
Red Wings Airlines	Almaty, Astana, Batumi, Bukhara, Chelyabinsk, Tashkent, Tbilisi, Yekaterinburg, Yerevan; Seasonal: Gelendzhik; Seasonal charter: Hambantota–Mattala, Nha Trang, Sharm El Sheikh
Rossiya	Saint Petersburg; Seasonal charter: Hurghada, Sharm El Sheikh
RusLine	Khanty-Mansiysk, Naryan-Mar, Saint Petersburg
S7 Airlines	Moscow–Domodedovo, Novosibirsk
Severstal Air Company	Cherepovets
Sky Vision Airlines	Seasonal charter: Sharm El Sheikh
Smartavia	Moscow–Sheremetyevo, Saint Petersburg
Somon Air	Dushanbe
Southwind Airlines	Seasonal charter: Antalya
Turkish Airlines	Istanbul
Turkmenistan Airlines	Aşgabat
Ural Airlines	Dushanbe, Osh
Utair	Omsk, Samara, Tyumen, Ufa; Seasonal: Grozny
UVT Aero	Chelyabinsk, Grozny, Kirov, Magnitogorsk, Nalchik, Nizhnevartovsk, Nizhny Novgorod, Novy Urengoy, Omsk, Orenburg, Perm, Samara, Samarqand, Saransk, Sochi, Tashkent, Tobolsk, Tomsk, Ulan-Ude, Usinsk, Yaroslavl, Yekaterinburg; Seasonal: Petrozavodsk
Uzbekistan Airways	Fergana, Samarqand, Tashkent
VietJet Air	Seasonal charter: Da Nang, Nha Trang
Yamal Airlines	Salekhard

== Statistics ==
=== Passenger statistics ===
Annual passenger traffic
Year	Passengers	% change
2004	309,900	Steady
2005	393,600	▲27.0%
2006	445,700	▲13.2%
2007	616,400	▲38.3%
2008	751,500	▲22.0%
2009	675,700	▼10.1%
2010	958,500	▲41.8%
2011	1,227,000	▲28.0%
2012	1,487,000	▲21.2%
2013	1,847,000	▲24.2%
2014	1,942,408	▲5.2%
2015	1,799,267	▼7.4%
2016	1,923,223	▲6.9%
2017	2,623,423	▲36.4%
2018	3,141,000	▲19.7%
2019	3,470,742	▲10.5%

=== Arrivals and departures ===
2004	2005	2006	2007	2008	2009	2010	2011	2012	2013
▲4,831	▲6,192	▲6,601	▲7,946	▲8,238	▼6,898	▲9,549	▲11,210	▲20,475	▲29,783

=== Cargo handled ===
2004	2005	2006	2008	2009	2010	2011	2012	2013
▲2,078	▲4,384	▲4,456	▲5,321	▼2,744	▲2,936	▲3,834	▲6,014	▲7,212

== Other facilities ==
Tatarstan Airlines had its head office on the airport property.

== Accidents and incidents ==
On 17 November 2013, Tatarstan Airlines Flight 363, a Boeing 737-500, operating for Tatarstan Airlines, crashed while attempting to land at the airport. All 44 passengers and six crew members died. Investigations revealed the pilot had not completed his primary flight training, a revelation which then led Russia's Federal Air Transport Agency (Rosaviatsiya) to revoke hundreds of pilots' licenses.

On 21 December 2016, a man drove his car through the airport's terminal while under the influence of drugs, causing an estimated 6,000,000 Russian rubles (US$100,000) in damage. The suspect, identified as Ruslan Nurtdinov, was charged with violating traffic rules, endangerment, and drug trafficking.

== Ground transportation ==
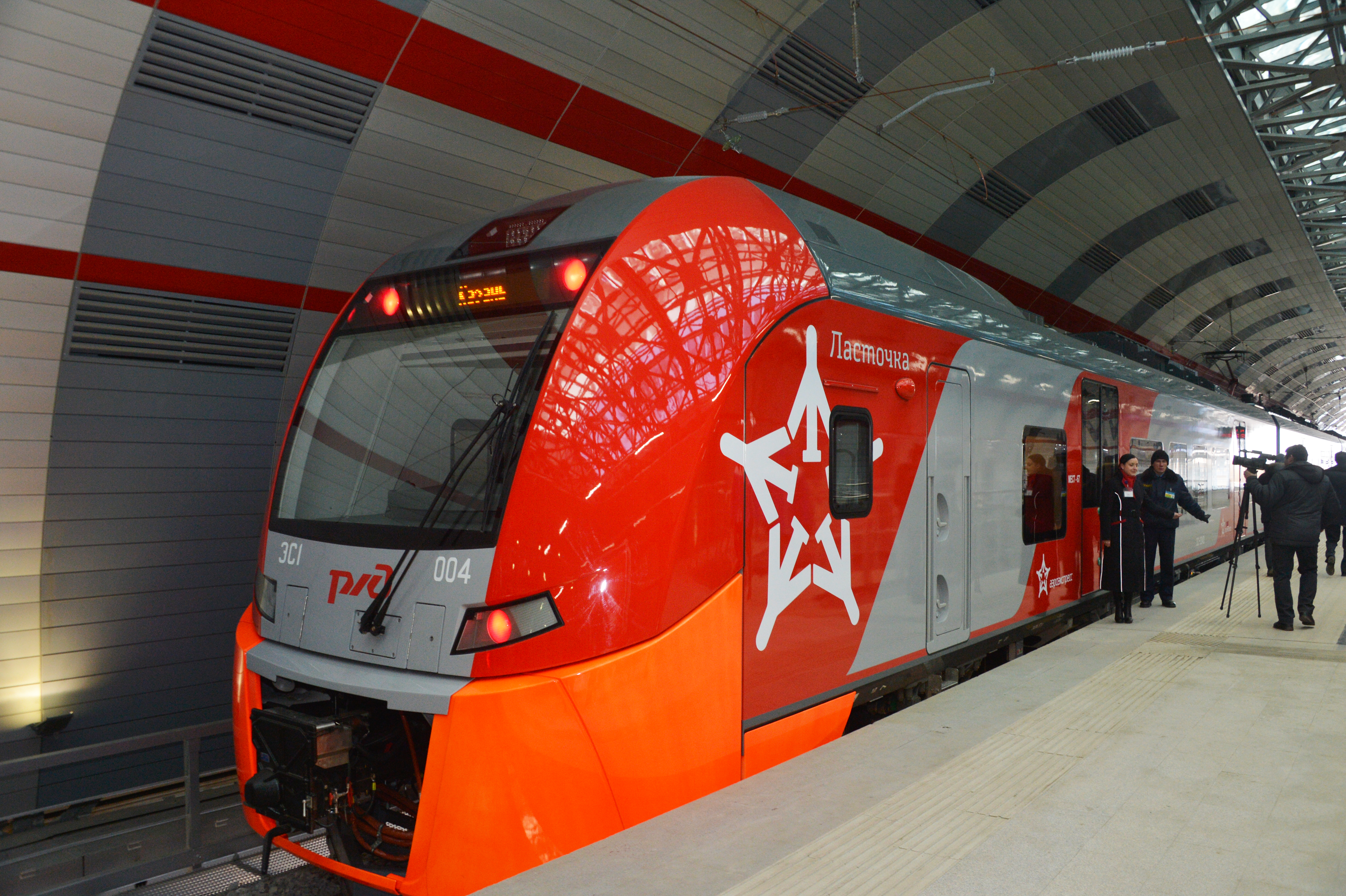

Kazan International Airport is connected to the city center (Kazan-Passazhirskaya railway station) by a 26-kilometer (16 mi) radial railway line. Operated by the suburban passenger company "Sodruzhestvo", the commuter train service also serves southern suburban residential areas and features a fare comparable to municipal public transport.

The line was originally opened on May 22, 2013, as a non-stop Aeroexpress shuttle service built for the 2013 Summer Universiade. On the opening day of the Universiade, Russian President Vladimir Putin used the Aeroexpress service from the airport to the city, praising its speed and comfort. Initially, the line utilized Siemens Desiro ("Lastochka") trains. However, due to low passenger numbers, high maintenance costs (roughly 40% more expensive than standard suburban trains), and the resulting unprofitability of the premium-fare service (costing 200 rubles at the time), the Desiro trains were replaced in 2014 by upgraded ED9M commuter electric multiple units.

Currently, the journey takes about 30 minutes, with trains running from early morning (first departure at 06:31) until late evening (21:40). The airport railway station is connected to Terminal 1A via a covered pedestrian walkway. Tickets can be purchased at the main railway station ticket offices or at self-service terminals inside the airport.

=== Road transport ===
The airport is accessible via the R245 highway, which branches off from the Orenburg tract (R239 highway) approximately 15 kilometers (9.3 mi) outside the Kazan city boundary. The airport territory includes parking facilities for 700 cars and 50 buses.

=== Bus ===
Bus connection to the city was established in 1979, when route No. 121 was launched from the old Kazan Airport. Over time, routes No. 122 and No. 123 were introduced along the same corridor. By the late 1990s, the latter two routes were discontinued, and route No. 121 was renumbered as No. 321.

Following a major overhaul of the city's bus network in 2007, route No. 97 began operating between Sotsgorod and the airport. In 2014, it was renumbered as route No. 197 and rerouted to run during daytime hours from the Eastern Bus Station via the Mega Kazan shopping center, Pobeda Avenue (including the metro station of the same name), the RKB/DRKB hospital campus, and the settlements of Stolbishche and Usady.

== See also ==
- List of airports in Russia
- List of the busiest airports in Europe
- List of the busiest airports in the former USSR
