= Kulob Airport =

Airport serving Kulob, Tajikistan

Kulob International Airport Tajik: Фурудгоҳи байналмилалии Кӯлоб Russian: Международный аэропорт «Куляб»
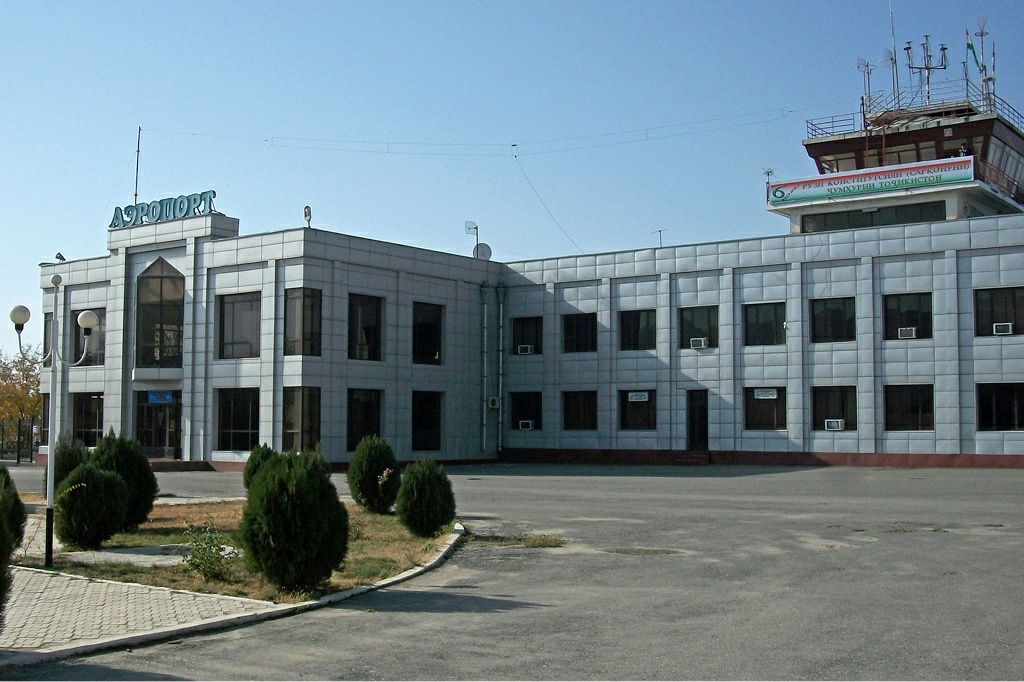
- Passenger terminal and control tower
- IATA: TJU; ICAO: UTDK

Summary
- Airport type: Public
- Owner: Government of Tajikistan
- Operator: OJSC "Kulob International Airport"
- Serves: Kulob, Khatlon Region, Tajikistan
- Location: Kulob
- Elevation AMSL: 2,293 ft (699 m)
- Coordinates: 37°59′18″N 069°48′18″E
- Website: airport-kulob.tj

Map
- Location of airport in Tajikistan

Runways
Direction	Length		Surface
Direction	m	ft	Surface
01/19	3,000	9,843	Asphalt
- Source: AIP Tajikistan

Kulob International Airport (Tajik: Фурудгоҳи байналмилалии Кӯлоб; Russian: Международный аэропорт «Куляб»), sometimes spelled as Kulyab International Airport ((IATA: TJU, ICAO: UTDK)), is an international airport serving Kulob, the third largest city of the country, and the capital of Khatlon Region of Tajikistan. Situated approximately 6 km (3.7 mi) north of the city centre, it functions alongside Dushanbe and Khujand as one of the country's primary commercial aviation gateways, serving southern Tajikistan and facilitating passenger links to destinations across Russia.

== History ==
Construction of the airfield began in 1977 during the Soviet period. Prior to the dissolution of the Soviet Union and Tajikistan's independence, the facility operated as a local domestic airport built to handle short-range passenger aircraft such as the Yakovlev Yak-40.

Following the civil war, the facility underwent extensive reconstruction: the single runway was widened from 35 metres (115 ft) to 45 metres (148 ft) and extended from 2,000 metres (6,600 ft) to 3,000 metres (9,800 ft). On 30 December 1995, the airport landed its first medium-haul passenger jet, a Tupolev Tu-154 operated under the command of Mirzo Mastongulov.

In 1998, the airport was granted full international status, inaugurating an official government and VIP delegation hall that was subsequently renovated in 2015. Regular scheduled international operations commenced in 2002, predominantly serving labour migration and business transit between Khatlon Province and the Russian Federation.

Between 2006 and 2014, the airport underwent phased upgrades:

- A dedicated departures terminal was opened in 2006
- Capital resurfacing and runway reinforcement works were finished in 2008
- A second floor was constructed atop the main passenger terminal in 2014, increasing passenger handling capacity by 200 travellers per hour
- Subsequent apron expansions and modern instrument navigation beacons were installed to accommodate commercial narrow-body jet airliners.

== Facilities ==
The airport resides at an elevation of 2,293 feet (699 m) above mean sea level.

=== Airfield and runway ===
The airport features a single operational runway aligned 01/19:

- Dimensions: 3,000 by 42 metres (9,843 ft × 138 ft)
- Surface: Asphalt concrete
- Capabilities: The runway and taxiway systems are engineered to accommodate narrow-body airliners including the Airbus A320 family, Boeing 737, and Tupolev Tu-154, as well as regional turboprops, charter jets, and tactical air transports.

== Airlines and destinations ==
=== Passenger ===
Airlines	Destinations
Nordwind Airlines	Kazan (since 2026-09-27)
Tajik Air	Dushanbe
Ural Airlines	Moscow–Domodedovo, Moscow–Zhukovsky

=== Former services ===
Multiple carriers previously operated regular scheduled or seasonal charter flights to Kulob:

- East Air: Operated scheduled services connecting Kulob with Moscow–Domodedovo, Yekaterinburg, and Novosibirsk until the airline had its air operator certificate revoked in 2014.
- S7 Airlines: Previously maintained direct routes to Moscow–Domodedovo and Novosibirsk.
- Somon Air: Operated domestic trunk services linking Kulob with Dushanbe, alongside seasonal international flights to Moscow, prior to consolidating passenger operations at Dushanbe and Khujand.
- Saratov Airlines: Flew seasonal charters to regional Russian airports until operations ceased in 2018.

== Traffic and throughput ==
Passenger and cargo traffic at the airport is monitored by the Civil Aviation Agency under the Government of the Republic of Tajikistan.

== Statistics ==
Annual passenger throughput and freight tonnage handled at Kulob International Airport:

=== Annual cargo volume ===
Annual passenger and cargo figures recorded across recent operational years include:

- 2024: 142,500 passengers and 410 metric tons of cargo
- 2023: 133,000 passengers and 385 metric tons of cargo
- 2022: 115,100 passengers and 340 metric tons of cargo
- 2021: 85,800 passengers and 270 metric tons of cargo
- 2020: 47,000 passengers and 160 metric tons of cargo (reduced operations due to COVID-19 pandemic travel restrictions)
- 2019: 131,000 passengers and 390 metric tons of cargo
- 2015: 130,100 passengers and 410 metric tons of cargo
- 2013: 157,000 passengers and 490 metric tons of cargo
- 2010: 109,000 passengers and 370 metric tons of cargo

== Ground transportation ==
The airport is positioned approximately 6 km (3.7 mi) north of central Kulob, accessible via the A385 highway. Local transit is handled by private motor vehicles, official airport taxis, and fixed-route shared minibuses (marshrutkas). The facility is also situated near the southern terminal station of Tajikistan Railways, providing onward rail links across Khatlon Province towards Bokhtar and Dushanbe.

== See also ==
- Transport in Tajikistan
- List of airports in Tajikistan
- Tajik Railways
