= Aviacon Zitotrans =

Russian airline

Aviacon Zitotrans Авиакомпания «Авиакон Цитотранс»
IATA	ICAO	Call sign
ZR	AZS	ZITOTRANS
- Founded: 1995
- Hubs: Koltsovo International Airport
- Focus cities: Vladivostok
- Fleet size: 5
- Destinations: 10
- Parent company: AVS Group Holding
- Headquarters: Yekaterinburg, Russia
- Website: aviacon.ru

JSC "Aviacon Zitotrans" (Russian: АО Авиакомпания «Авиакон Цитотранс», AO Aviakompaniya «Aviakon Tsitotrans») is a private cargo airline based in Yekaterinburg, Russia.

== History ==
It was established and started operations in June 1995 and specializes in air transportation of heavy and outsize, high-value, dangerous goods, aerospace equipment, sea containers, humanitarian, government, military, live cargo on IL-76 TD worldwide. It has more than 170 employees and its main base is Koltsovo International Airport, Yekaterinburg. In 2008, the name of the company was changed to Aviacon Air Cargo.

== Fleet ==
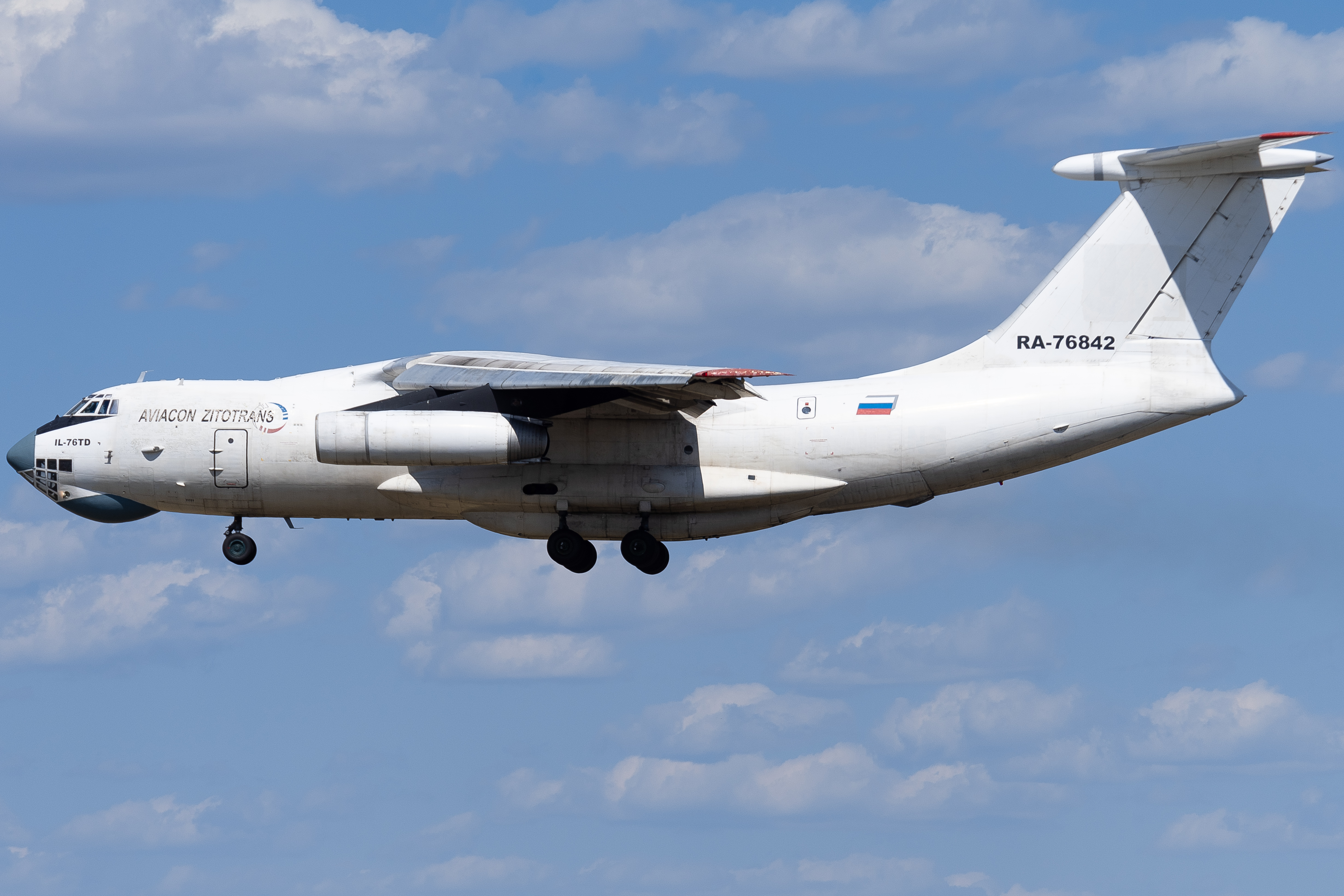
Aviacon Zitotrans Ilyushin Il-76

As of August 2025, Aviacon Zitotrans operates the following aircraft:

- 5 Ilyushin Il-76TD

== Sanctions ==
On 26 January 2023, due to Russian invasion of Ukraine, the airline was included in the US sanctions list against PMC Wagner. Also 4 IL-76TD aircraft of the company RA-76502, RA-76842, RA-76846, RA-78765 were sanctioned.

The airline carried out cargo transportation for enterprises of the Russian defense complex that were sanctioned. In addition, Aviacon Zitotrans transported military equipment such as missiles, warheads and helicopter parts around the world, sending military equipment to Venezuela, Africa and other countries.

— Treasury Sanctions Russian Proxy Wagner Group as a Transnational Criminal Organization

Earlier, on 19 October 2022, the company was included in the sanctions list of Ukraine. On 19 May 2023 Aviacon Zitotrans was included in Canada's sanctions list against companies that provide military technology to the Russian armed forces.
