= Bokhtar International Airport =

Bokhtar International Airport Фурудгоҳи байналмилалии «Бохтар»
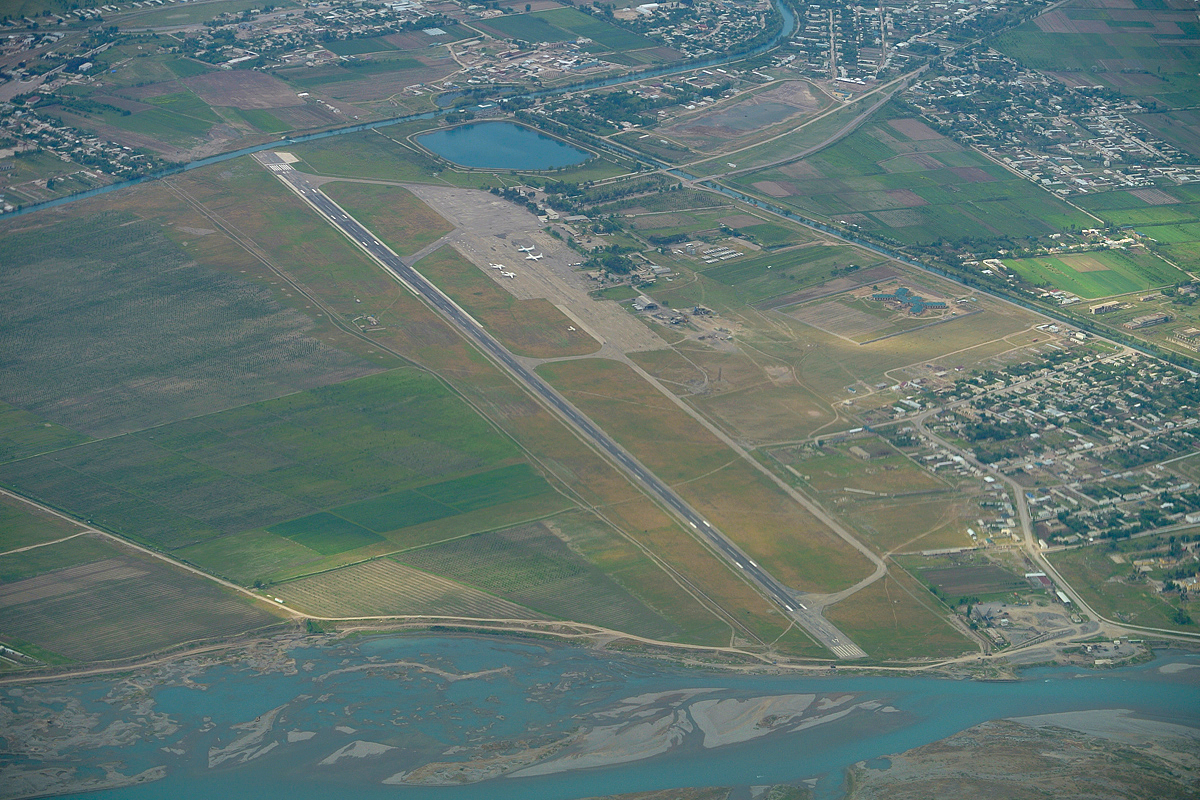
- IATA: KQT; ICAO: UTDT

Summary
- Airport type: Civil
- Location: Qurghonteppa, Khatlon Province
- Hub for: Tajik Air
- Coordinates: 37°51′44″N 068°51′46″E

Map
- Location of airport in Tajikistan

Runways
Direction	Length		Surface
Direction	ft	m	Surface
17/35	7,497	2,285	Asphalt
- Source: AIP Tajikistan

Bokhtar International Airport (Tajik: Фурудгоҳи байналмилалии «Бохтар», romanized: Furudgohi Baynalmilalii Bohtar, Russian: Международный аэропорт «Бохтар»; ) is an international airport (IATA: KQT, ICAO: UTDT) five kilometers northeast of the city of Bokhtar (until 2018 was called Qurghonteppa), near the village of Levakant. Also known as Kurgan-Tyube, but after renaming the city of Kurgan-Tyube to Bokhtar, it changed its name in the same way. It is one of the four international airports in Tajikistan.

== History ==
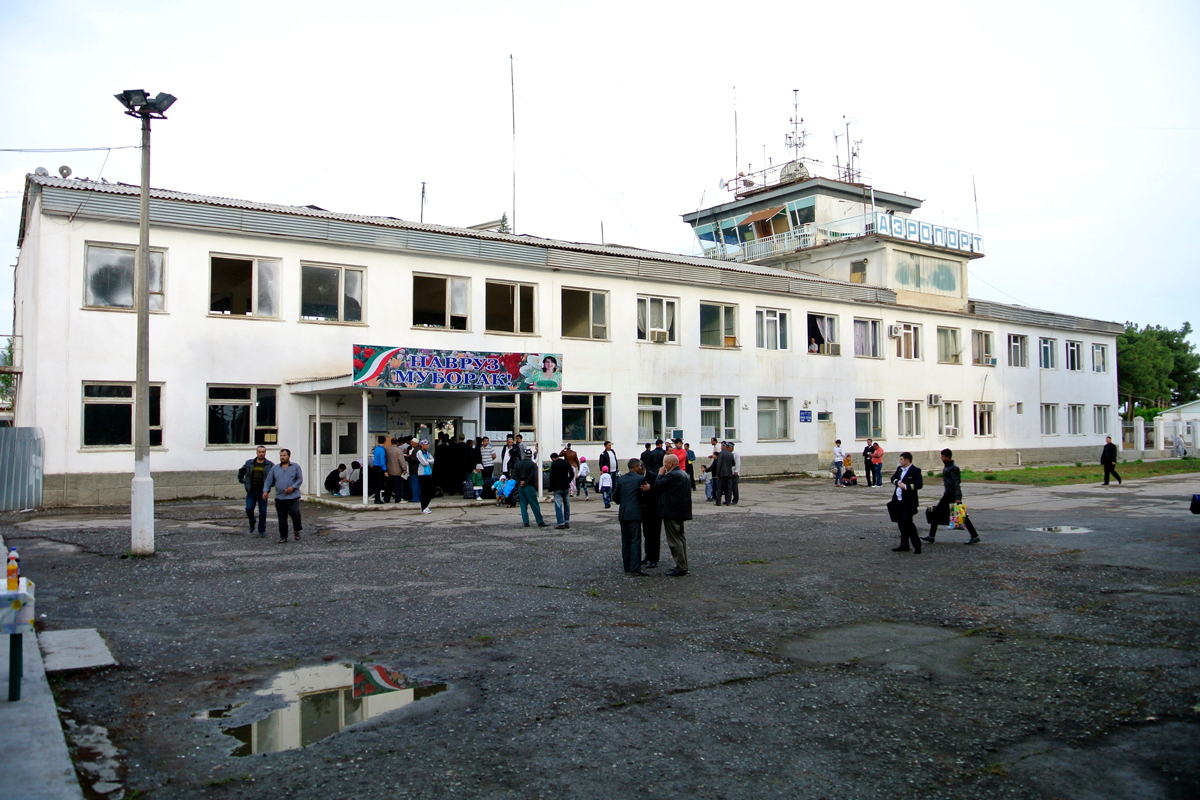

The airport was built and opened in years of Soviet rule, and received the status of international airport after the end of the civil war in Tajikistan. The airport is able to take helicopters of all types, and aircraft such as the Airbus A320 and Boeing 737.

Since the beginning of the 2000s and until recently, in different years, the airport has had regular flights with a number of Russian cities, such as Moscow, St. Petersburg, Novosibirsk, Yekaterinburg, Kazan, Saratov, Orenburg, and also once with the Kazakhstani city of Almaty. Today, it still has an irregular flight connection with only two airports in Tajikistan: the Dushanbe International Airport and the Khujand Airport.

The current decline of the airport is due to the Kulob Airport, located 85 kilometers to the east of Bokhtar, which is larger than the Bokhtar Airport, as well as disagreements between the aviation authorities of Tajikistan and Russia, which began in the spring of 2017. Both airports are located in the Khatlon province.

== Airlines and destinations ==
In the 2000s, the airport used to serve regular flights to few Russian cities, but in the last few years it only receives irregular flights from Khujand.

Airlines	Destinations
Nordwind Airlines	Moscow–Sheremetyevo
