= Somon Air =

Tajik airline

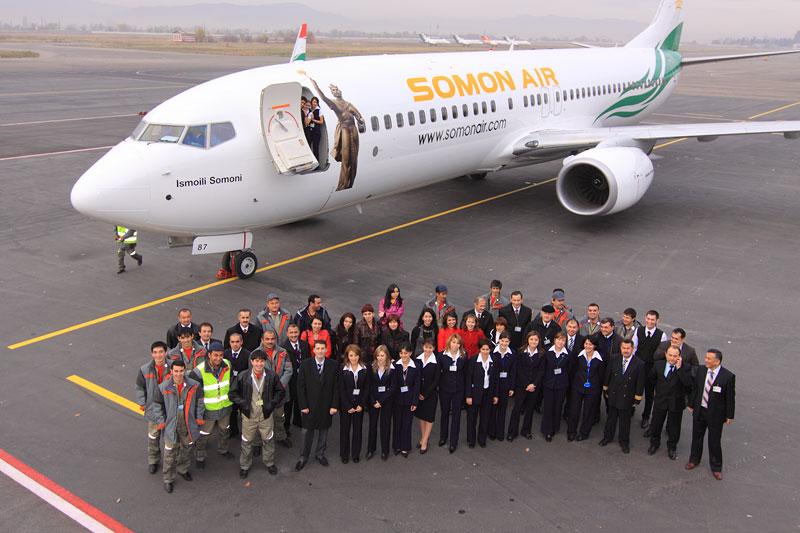
IATA	ICAO	Call sign
SZ	SMR	SOMON AIR
- Founded: 2007
- Commenced operations: February 2008
- Hubs: Dushanbe International Airport
- Focus cities: Dushanbe, Khujand
- Fleet size: 6
- Destinations: 27
- Headquarters: Dushanbe, Tajikistan
- Key people: Abdulkosim Valiev (CEO)
- Website: www.somonair.com

Air Company Somon Air LLC (Russian and Tajik: Сомон Эйр) is a private airline in Tajikistan headquartered in Dushanbe and based at Dushanbe International Airport.

== History ==
The airline started operating on 5 February 2008 with regular flights to Moscow. Somon Air also serves as the official carrier of President of the Republic of Tajikistan and other Tajikistan high-ranking officials. Since its formation, Somon Air has been primarily focused on passenger service and transportation to Eastern Europe and other locations. Most flights to international destinations operate from Dushanbe.

In early August 2009, Somon Air joined IATA's (International Air Transport Association) IATA Billing and Settlement Plan. As of January 2013, the airline participates in 14 BSP countries. BSP is a settlement system designed to simplify the selling, reporting and remitting procedures between passenger sales agents and airlines globally. In April 2013, Somon Air jointed the IATA Multilateral Interline Traffic Agreement (MITA). The IATA Multilateral Interline Traffic Agreement (MITA) is an agreement where passengers and cargo use a standard traffic document on various transportation modes to reach the final destination on a particular routing.

In June 2013, Somon Air became a member of IATA Clearing House which provides a service for settling of interline accounts, airline-associated companies and travel partners.

In September 2017, Somon Air obtained IATA membership and is working on signing interline agreements with some of major airlines from the Commonwealth of Independent States (CIS), Europe and Asia.

In July 2019, Somon Air opened an aviation training center for aviation specialists at its headquarters in Dushanbe.

On 18 December 2019, Somon Air received the award "Brand of the Year 2019" bestowed by the Republic of Tajikistan.

On 30 August 2022, Somon Air received the first of two Boeing 737-800 aircraft.

On 8 September 2022, the airline received its second Boeing 737-800 aircraft.

== Destinations ==
Somon Air flies to following destinations as of June 2022:

Country	City	Airport	Notes	Refs
Afghanistan	Kabul	Kabul International Airport	Terminated	
Belarus	Minsk	Minsk National Airport		
China	Ürümqi	Ürümqi Tianshan International Airport		
Georgia	Tbilisi	Tbilisi International Airport		
Germany	Munich	Munich Airport		
India	Delhi	Indira Gandhi International Airport		
Iran	Tehran	Imam Khomeini International Airport		
Kazakhstan	Almaty	Almaty International Airport		
Kazakhstan	Astana	Nursultan Nazarbayev International Airport		
Kyrgyzstan	Bishkek	Manas International Airport		
Pakistan	Islamabad	Islamabad International Airport		
Qatar	Doha	Hamad International Airport		
Russia	Irkutsk	International Airport Irkutsk	Terminated	
Russia	Kazan	Ğabdulla Tuqay Kazan International Airport		
Russia	Khanty-Mansiysk	Khanty-Mansiysk Airport	Terminated	
Russia	Krasnodar	Krasnodar International Airport	Terminated	
Russia	Krasnoyarsk	Krasnoyarsk International Airport		
Russia	Makhachkala	Uytash Airport	Terminated	
Russia	Moscow	Moscow Domodedovo Airport		
Russia	Moscow	Vnukovo International Airport	Terminated	
Russia	Moscow	Zhukovsky International Airport		
Russia	Nizhnevartovsk	Nizhnevartovsk Airport	Terminated	
Russia	Novosibirsk	Tolmachevo Airport		
Russia	Orenburg	Orenburg Tsentralny Airport	Terminated	
Russia	Saint Petersburg	Pulkovo Airport		
Russia	Samara	Kurumoch International Airport		
Russia	Sochi	Adler-Sochi International Airport		
Russia	Surgut	Farman Salmanov Surgut Airport		
Russia	Tyumen	Roshchino Airport	Terminated	
Russia	Yekaterinburg	Koltsovo International Airport		
Saudi Arabia	Jeddah	King Abdulaziz International Airport		
Tajikistan	Dushanbe	Dushanbe International Airport	Hub	
Tajikistan	Khujand	Khujand Airport	Focus city	
Tajikistan	Kulob	Kulob Airport		
Turkey	Istanbul	Istanbul Airport		
Turkey	Trabzon	Trabzon Airport		
Ukraine	Simferopol	Simferopol International Airport	Terminated	
United Arab Emirates	Dubai	Dubai International Airport		
Uzbekistan	Bukhara	Bukhara International Airport	Terminated	
Uzbekistan	Tashkent	Tashkent International Airport		

=== Codeshare and Interline agreements ===
Somon Air currently has a codeshare and interline agreement with Asiana Airlines.

== Fleet ==
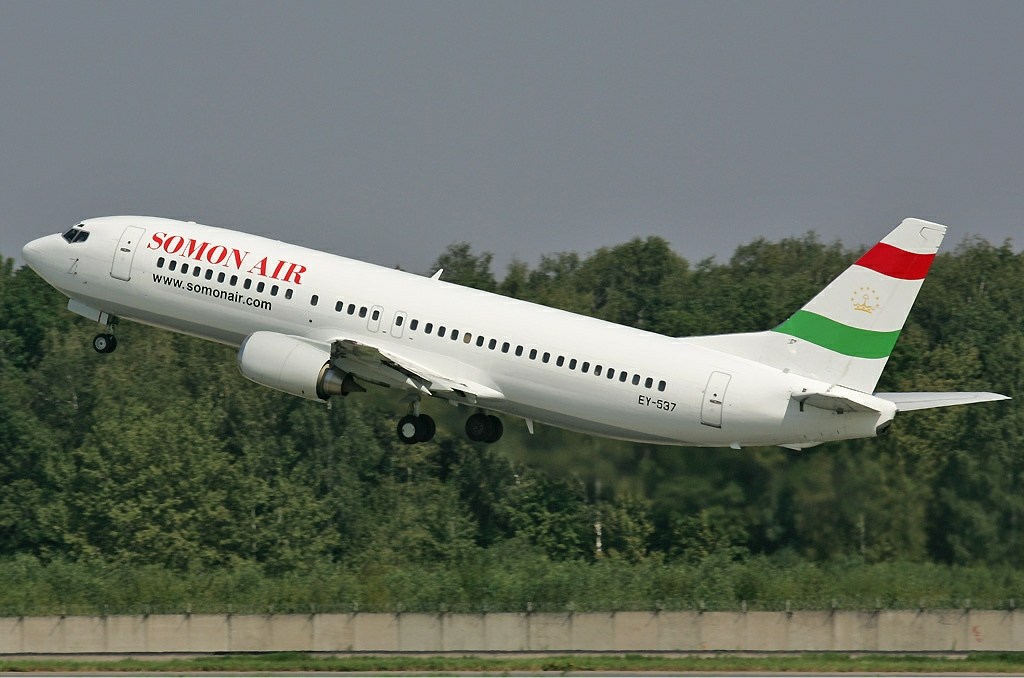
A former Somon Air Boeing 737-400

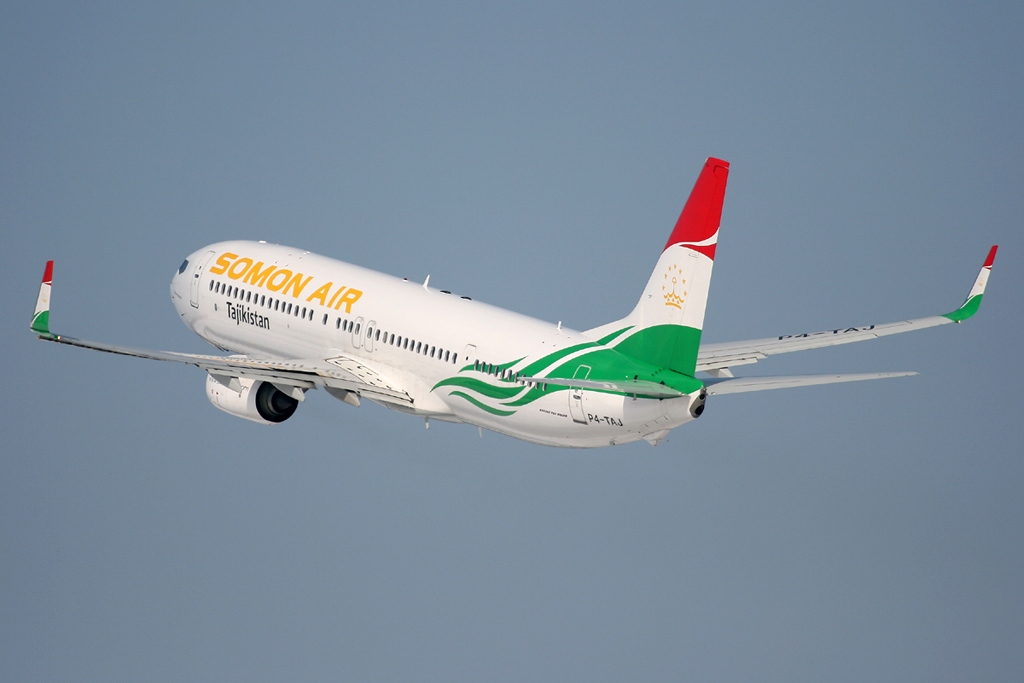
Somon Air Boeing 737-900ER

=== Current fleet ===
As of October 2026, Somon Air operates an all-Boeing fleet composed of the following aircraft:

Somon Air fleet
Aircraft	In service	Orders	Passengers			Notes
Aircraft	In service	Orders	J	Y	Total	Notes
Boeing 737-800	4	—	—	189	189	
Boeing 737-900ER	2	—	16	168	184	
Boeing 737 MAX 8	2	11	TBA			Deliveries from 2026. Leased from DAE Capital. Named Abu Ali ibn Sino and Rudaki.
Boeing 787-9	—	4	TBA			
Total	6	16				

=== Fleet development ===
Somon Air signed a memorandum of understanding to purchase a Boeing 787-8 at the 2018 Dubai Air Show for further fleet development. This has not yet been firmed. The company still hoped to launch wide-body flights that year with a 767-300ER. The airline was considering the purchase of four Embraer 190-E2, to replace older Boeing 737 Classic aircraft. The airline planned to commence service of the new Embraer aircraft by the end of 2018, but by September 2019, there had been no further announcement. In November 2019, Somon Air signed a memorandum of understanding with the Airbus group of companies under which the airline intended to acquire helicopters and the latest Airbus family aircraft directly from the manufacturer.

In 2025, Boeing and Somon Air announced that the Tajik carrier had placed its largest-ever order for 14 aircraft. The airline ordered Boeing 787-9 widebody aircraft and up to 10 Boeing 737-8 narrowbody aircraft.

On 27 July 2026, the company's fleet replenished the first Boeing 737 MAX 8., followed by the second, named Rudaki, on 12 September 2026.
