= Gelendzhik Airport =

Airport in Krasnodar Krai, Russia

- IATA: GDZ; ICAO: URKG

Summary
- Airport type: Public
- Location: Gelendzhik, Russia
- Elevation AMSL: 131 ft (40 m)
- Coordinates: 44°34′21″N 38°00′34″E
- Website: GelAero.ru/

Map
- Location of airport in Krasnodar Krai

Runways
Direction	Length		Surface
Direction	ft	m	Surface
01/19	10,170	3,100	Asphalt

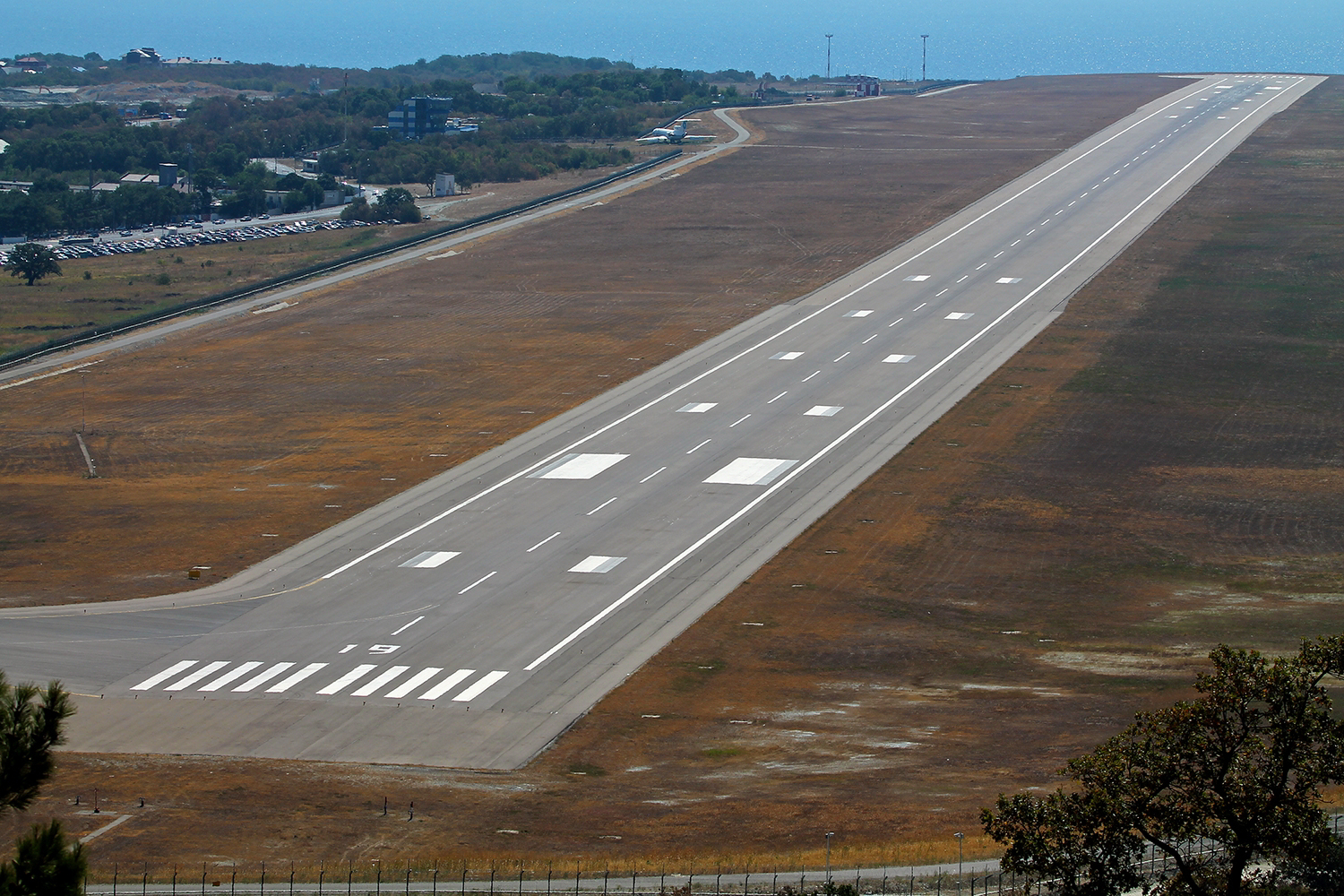
Runway of the Gelendzhik Airport

Gelendzhik Airport (Russian: Аэропорт Геленджик, romanized: Aeroport Gelendzhik) (IATA: GDZ, ICAO: URKG) is an airport in Krasnodar Krai, Russia. It serves the resort town of Gelendzhik and the much larger nearby city of Novorossiysk. The airport opened to passengers on 5 June 2010.

== History ==
The building of a new terminal of the Gelendzhik Airport was completed in December 2021.

On February 24, 2022, following the start of the Russian invasion of Ukraine, all civilian flights to and from the airport were indefinitely suspended.

Federal Air Transport Agency announced the airport's reopening on July 10, 2025, for regular passenger flights with some restrictions. Commercial flights formally resumed on July 18 with the arrival of an Aeroflot passenger flight from Sheremetyevo Airport in Moscow.

== Airlines and destinations ==
As of July 2025 Gelendzhik Airport is going to serve following destinations:

Airlines	Destinations
Aeroflot	Moscow–Sheremetyevo
Nordstar Airlines	Seasonal: Krasnoyarsk, Moscow-Domodedovo
Red Wings Airlines	Seasonal: Kazan, Samara
Rossiya Airlines	Saint Petersburg
Smartavia	Seasonal: Saint Petersburg
Ural Airlines	Seasonal: Moscow-Domodedovo, Yekaterinburg
Utair	Moscow–Vnukovo, Saint Petersburg; Seasonal: Surgut, Tyumen, Ufa

== See also ==
- List of airports in Russia
