= Farkhor Air Base =

Military base in Farkhor, Tajikistan

- Farkhor, Tajikistan

Site information
- Type: Military base
- Owner: Tajikistan Air Force
- Controlled by: Tajikistan Air Force

Location
- Location within Tajikistan
- Location within Tajikistan
- Coordinates: 37.4701°N 69.3809°E

Garrison information
- Occupants: Tajikistan Air Force

Farkhor Air Base is a military airfield located near the town of Farkhor in Tajikistan, 130 kilometres (81 mi) southeast of the capital Dushanbe.

Farkhor was reported by Indian media outlets as country's first military base outside its territory. India operated a field hospital at Farkhor in the late-1990s and early-2000s, which was closed after the establishment of NATO-led ISAF mission, in 2008.

== History ==
In 1996–97, the Research & Analysis Wing (R&AW) started negotiations with Tajikistan to use the Farkhor Air Base to transport high-altitude military supplies to the Afghan Northern Alliance, service their helicopters and gather intelligence. At that time, India operated a small military hospital in the Farkhor region. The hospital at Farkhor was used to treat Afghan Northern Alliance members injured in fighting with the Taliban, including military leader Ahmad Shah Massoud, who was rushed there after a suicide attack against him.

In 2002, India acknowledged that it was setting up an air base in Farkhor with Russian assistance. The base was shut down in 2008. As of 2015, there has not been any evidence of Indian Air Force presence at Farkhor.

== See also ==
- Geostrategy in Central Asia
- Ayni Air Base
