= Ayni Airport =

Ayni Airport Аэропорт «Айни Фурудгоҳи Айнӣ
- IATA: none; ICAO: none; LID: АЙН

Summary
- Airport type: Public
- Operator: Government
- Serves: Ayni, Tajikistan
- Coordinates: 39°24′17″N 068°31′23.7″E

Map
- Location of airport in Tajikistan

Runways
| Direction | Length | | Surface |
| Direction | m | ft | Surface |
|---|---|---|---|
| 14/33 | 992 | 3,255 |
- Source: World Airport Codes

Ayni Airport (Russian: Аэропорт «Айни»; Tajik: Фурудгоҳи Айнӣ) is an airport serving Ayni in the Sughd Province in Tajikistan. It does not seem to be coded in IATA or ICAO lists, but had the code АЙН in the former USSR internal system.
