= Stolbishche =

Stolbishche Столбище
- Khutor
- Location within Belgorod Oblast Location within Russia
- Coordinates: 50°31′N 37°46′E
- Country: Russia
- Region: Belgorod Oblast
- District: Volokonovsky District
- Time zone: UTC+3:00

Stolbishche (Russian: Столбище) is a rural locality (a khutor) in Volokonovsky District, Belgorod Oblast, Russia. The population was 145 as of 2010. There is 1 street.

== Geography ==
Stolbishche is located 12 km northwest of Volokonovka (the district's administrative centre) by road. Yutanovka is the nearest rural locality.
