= Ayni Air Force Base =

Military airfield in Tajikistan

- Rudaki, Tajikistan

Site information
- Type: Air force base
- Controlled by: Tajik Air Force

Location
- Location within Tajikistan
- Coordinates: 38.5142°N 68.6755°E

Site history
- Materials: Asphalt

Garrison information
- Occupants: Tajik Air Force

Ayni Air Force Base, also known as Gissar Air Base, is located in Tajikistan, 10 km (6.2 mi) west of the capital Dushanbe. It is operated by Tajik Air Force, which has an independent Helicopter Squadron based here.

The base was jointly operated by the Indian Air Force and the Tajik Air Force from 2002, until 2022. It was India's second overseas air base after Farkhor Air Base. Since 2014 India had deployed Su-30MKI in limited numbers at this base. It was extensively used by Indian Air Force as a standby base for its aircraft to evacuate Indian Nationals from Kabul Airport amidst the Afghan Crisis. India withdrew from the air base after the lease agreement expired in 2022. The withdrawal was completed by October 2025.

== History ==
Reports began circulating in early 2000s that India would establish air bases at Ayni and Farkhor in Tajikistan. Both Indian and Tajik officials issued immediate denials, but they did admit that India had been renovating the bases since 2002. In January 2011, Tajik Foreign Minister, Hamrohan Zarifi, officially launched negotiations with Russia to discuss possible deployment of Russian military at Ayni. Zarifi also ruled out deployment of Indian or American forces at Ayni.

During the Cold War era, Ayni served as a major military base of the Soviet Union — possibly of the Central Asian Military District. However, following Soviet withdrawal from Afghanistan, the base's infrastructure deteriorated significantly. Between 2002 and 2010, India spent nearly US$70 million to renovate the air base — the runway was extended to 3,200 meters and state-of-the-art navigational and air defense equipment were installed. It was speculated by some media outlets that India was keen on establishing a military base in Ayni so as to gain a strategic foothold in Central Asia.

In 2018 India renewed its interest in the Ayni airbase. The scope and scale of India's military detachment in Ayni was a subject of discussion between India, Russia and Tajikistan as Russia patrolled the Tajik skies and had a motorised rifle division deployed in Ayni. Since being admitted to the Shanghai Cooperation Organisation (SCO) in 2018 and participating in war games with its members, Delhi was enthusiastic to revive the relationship with Tajikistan, now that India-Russian ties were its zenith due to massive defence deals between two nations. Tajikistan was also a member of the Collective Security Treaty Organisation (CSTO), along with Russia, Armenia, Kazakhstan and Kyrgyzstan, and required a green signal from the CSTO to allow Indian military operations at Ayni.

An Indian online newspaper The Print reported on 23 August 2021 that around 2001–2002 Indian Government came up with the proposal to set up an airbase in Tajikistan as Tajikistan is just about 20 km (12 mi) from Pakistan Administered Kashmir across the corridor. Having the ability to operate from Tajikistan, IAF fighters could target Peshawar from Tajikistan, which would put additional pressure on the resources of Pakistan. The IAF appointed the then Group Captain Naseem Akhtar to begin the work on the airbase. Akhtar, who retired as Air Commodore, was followed by another officer. The Indian government also involved the Border Roads Organisation (BRO) team which was led by a Brigadier. At that point in time, there were around 200 Indians working on the project and the airstrip at Gissar was extended to 3,200 metres — long enough for most fixed-wing aircraft to land and take-off. Besides this, the Indian team also developed hangars, overhauling and the refuelling capacity of aircraft. It is estimated that India spent close to $US100 million developing the base. Birender Singh Dhanoa, then a Group Captain-ranked officer, was appointed the first Base Commander of the base around the end of 2005.

In late October 2025, it was reported that the India-Tajikistan bilateral agreement for the rehabilitation and development of aerodromes in the country had lapsed in 2022 and Tajikistan refused to renew the lease of the air base. From 2021 to October 2025, Indian forces gradually pulled back from the air base.

== See also ==
- Geostrategy in Central Asia
- Farkhor Air Base
