= Zhukovsky International Airport =

Airport in Zhukovsky, Russia

Zhukovsky International Airport Международный Аэропорт Жуковский

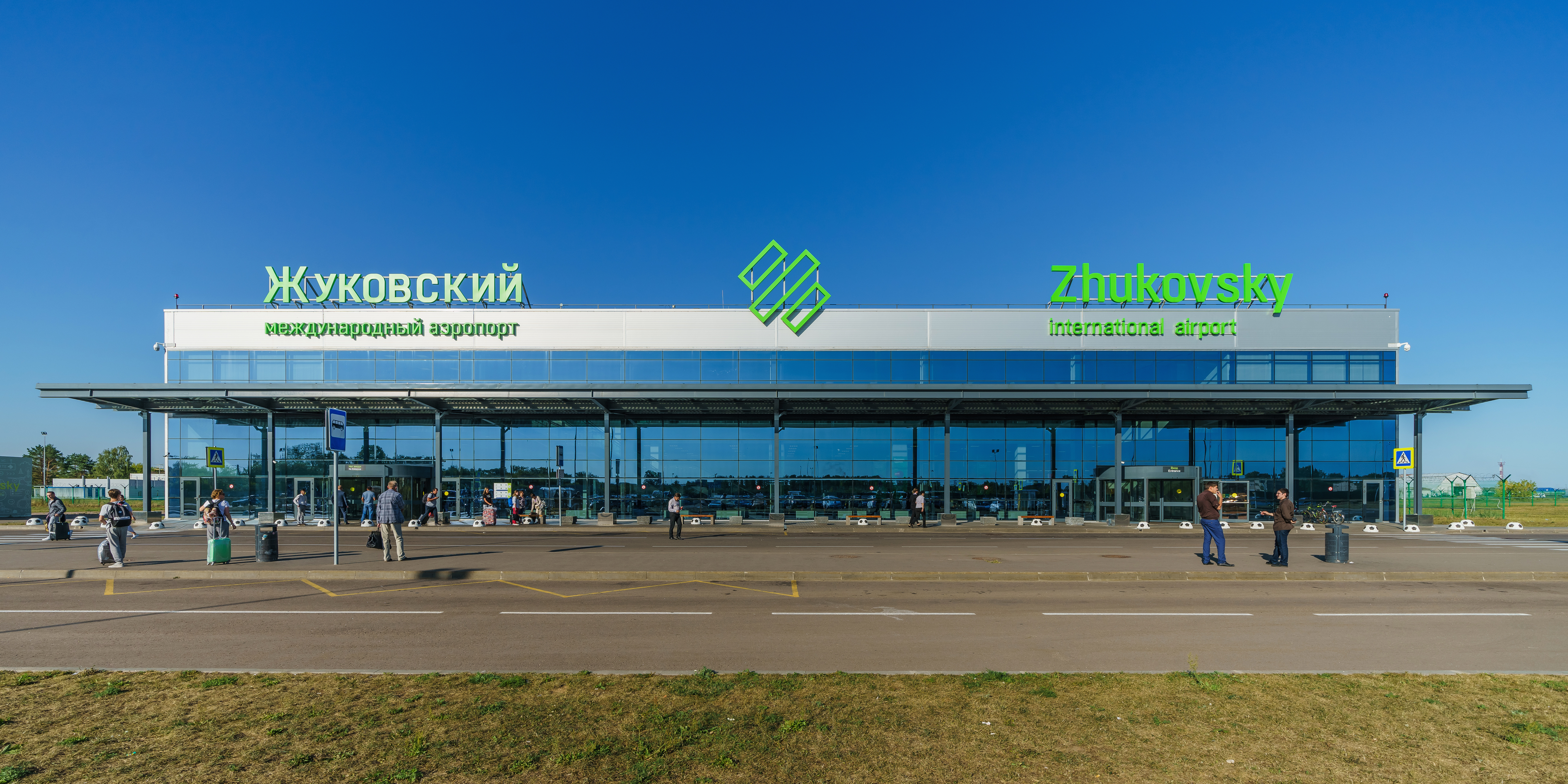
- IATA: ZIA; ICAO: UUBW; LID: РНУ

Summary
- Airport type: Public
- Operator: Ramport Aero
- Serves: Moscow
- Location: Zhukovsky, Russia
- Focus city for: Red Wings Airlines; Ural Airlines
- Elevation AMSL: 123 m (404 ft)
- Coordinates: 55°33′12″N 38°9′6″E
- Website: zia.aero

Map
- Location of the airport in Moscow Oblast Location of the airport in Russia Location of the airport in Europe

Runways
Direction	Length		Surface
Direction	m	ft	Surface
12/30	4,600	15,100	Concrete

Statistics (2018)
- Passengers: 1,426,000
- Passenger change 24-25: ▼4.4%

Zhukovsky (IATA: ZIA, ICAO: UUBW) (Russian: Жуковский), formerly (and still occasionally) known as Ramenskoye (Russian: Раменское), is an international airport located in Moscow Oblast, Russia, 36 km (22 mi) southeast of central Moscow, in the city of Zhukovsky, a few kilometers south-east of the closed Bykovo Airport.

== History ==
ZIA Airport official logo before March 2025

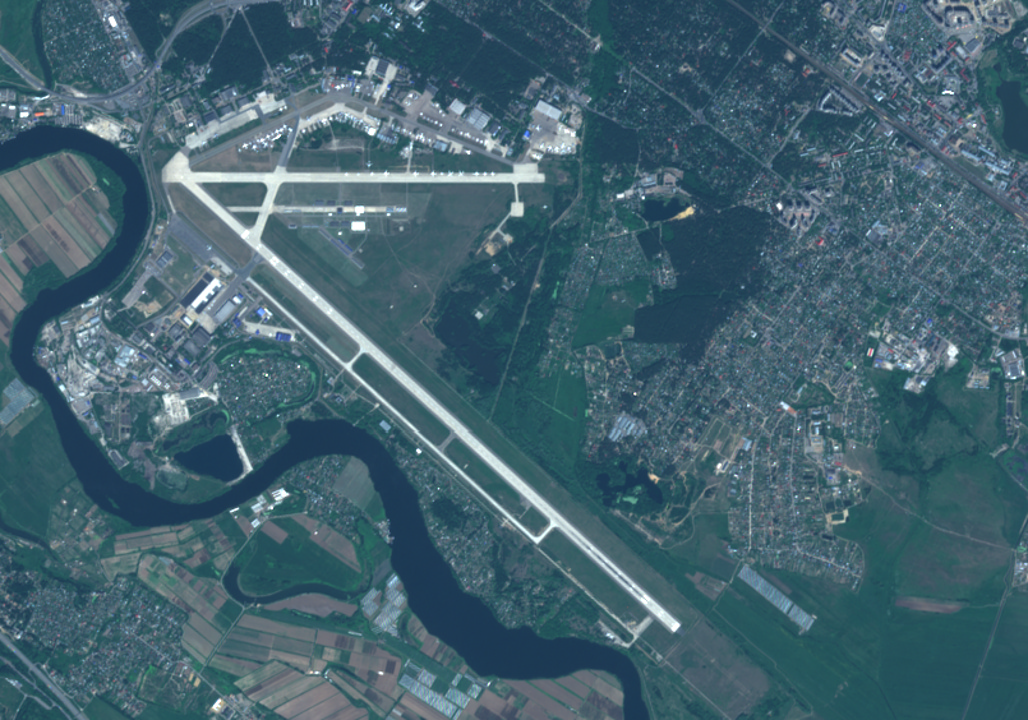
Satellite photo of the airport (located left and below the runways, photo taken in 2019)

The airfield began as a military airbase, originally assigned in 1941 to the newly established Flight Research Institute which served as a USSR aircraft testing establishment, with most of the major Russian OKBs having facilities there.

The airfield was used as a test site in the 1980s for the Soviet Buran Spacecraft. It was also used by the Ministry of Emergency Situations and cargo carriers.

Until June 2006, jet fighters flights for the public and international customers were available at the Gromov Flight Research Institute airfield (a number of two-seater jets like: Aero L-39 Albatros, Mikoyan-Gurevich MiG-25 Foxbat, for Edge of Space flights, Mikoyan MiG-29 Fulcrum, etc.).

On March 29, 2011, then Russian prime minister Vladimir Putin proposed moving all charter and low-cost flights to Ramenskoye Airport (as it was then called) to relieve Moscow's Sheremetyevo, Domodedovo, and Vnukovo airports and reduce the cost of tickets. A new terminal was constructed and the airport scheduled to be opened on 16 March 2016, but was later postponed due to lack of interest and airport certification issues. Originally named the same as the airfield after the nearby city of Ramenskoye, the airport was officially renamed after the city of Zhukovsky, in which it is geographically situated, and opened on 30 May 2016. The opening ceremony was attended by Russian Prime Minister Dmitry Medvedev.

The airfield is also the location of the biennial MAKS Airshow.

=== Construction of the airport ===
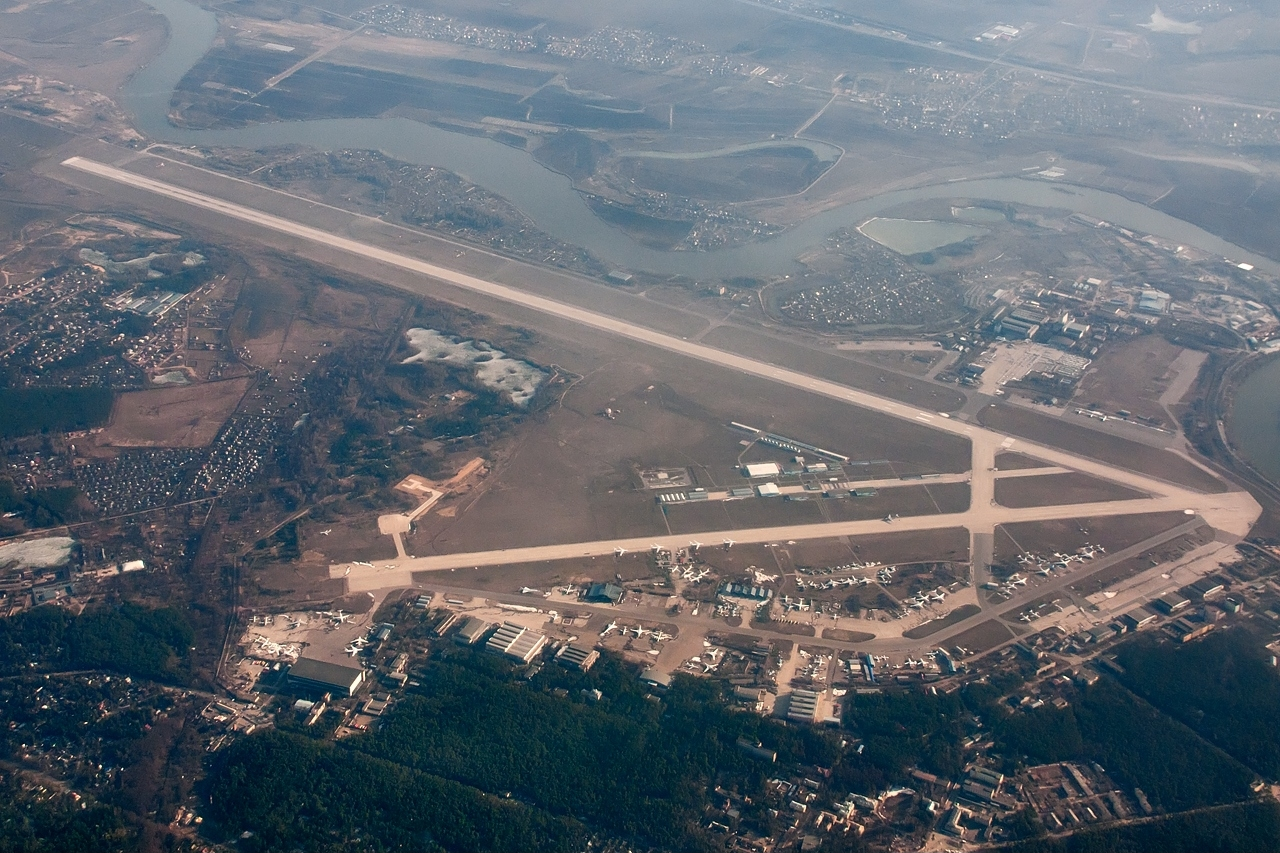
Gromov Flight Research Institute airfield before the construction of the airport began (photo taken in 2011)

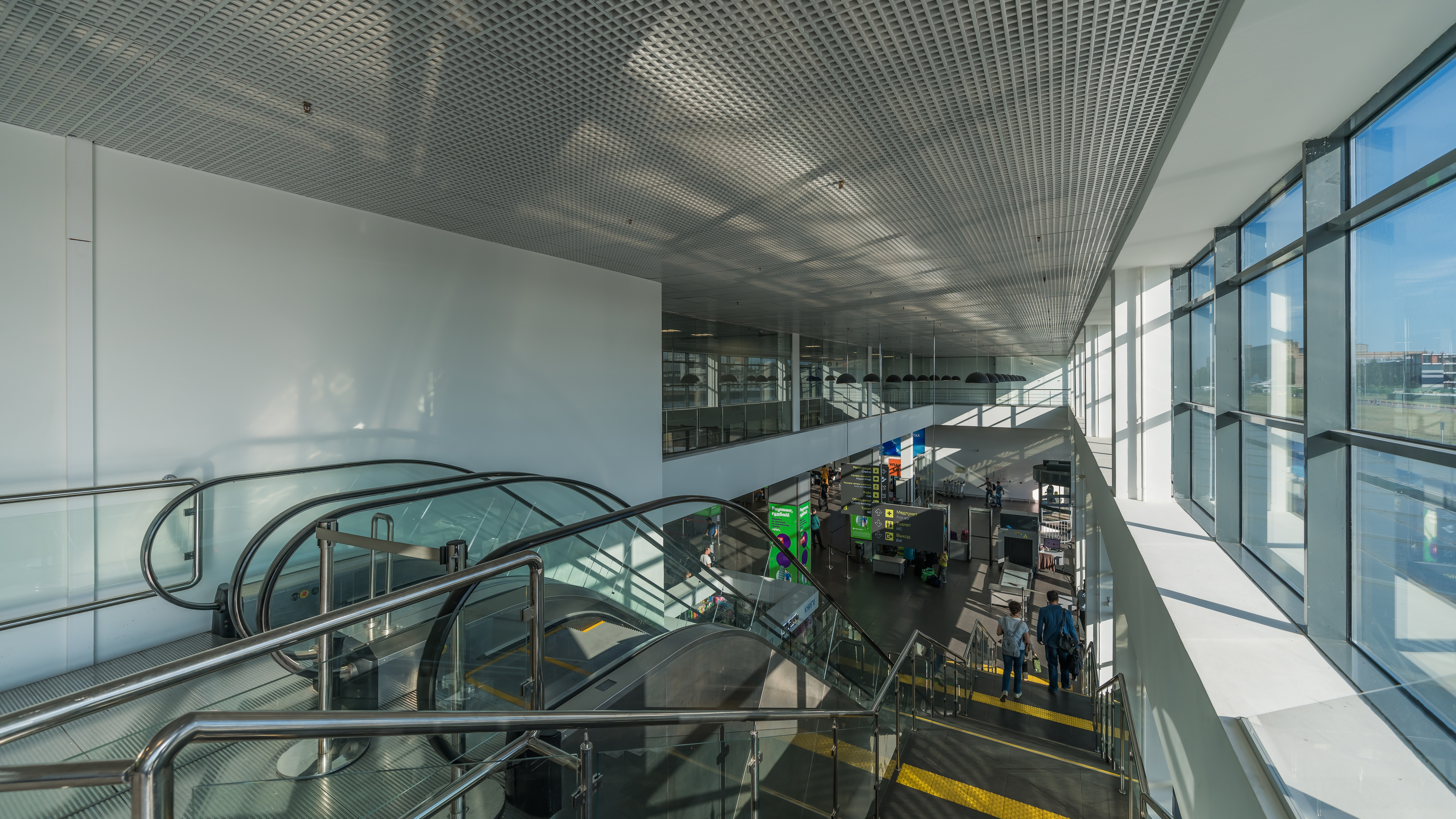
Airport terminal interior, 2018

The joint venture "Ramport Aero" formed to operate the airport in 2016 included Lithuania's Avia Solutions Group (75%) and Russia state corporation Rostec (25%), with plans to expand the airport in three stages. The opening of the new airport was delayed and an aircraft limit to Ramenskoye was in place in 2016,

Following the addition of new facilities for commercial operation, the airport opened in May 2016.

Air France-KLM noted in 2016 that it would intend to use Ramenskoye as a diversion airport for Sheremetyevo in emergency situations.

In October 2018, Avia Solutions Group (ASG), sold its share of the airport management company to the management of Ramport Aero

According to a 2018 development plan, there were plans in 2019 to build two passenger terminals (with a capacity of 2 million and 5 million passengers per year), a hotel with 250 rooms, office buildings, open parking for 1,240 parking spaces and covered parking, with a capacity of up to 7,426 cars, as well as the station for aeroexpress. The first phase of the new airport in 2016 would have a capacity of 1.7 million passengers annually, and if realized, could support up to 10.8 million by 2020. The development of the project was expected to improve the transport infrastructure in the Moscow area.

The airport terminal area is now 17,000 sq meters and the throughput capacity is up to two mln passengers per year.

In May 2026 airport commence the terminal expansion by adding extra spaces from the right and left side to it - 800 sq m from each side.

== Airlines and destinations ==
=== Passenger ===
The following airlines operated regular and scheduled services to and from Zhukovsky as of November 2023:

Airlines	Destinations
Armenian Airlines	Yerevan
Belavia	Minsk-National
Red Wings Airlines	Baku, Batumi, Minsk, Nyagan, Saransk, Tel Aviv, Tbilisi; Seasonal: Daşoguz
RusLine	Beloyarsky
Somon Air	Dushanbe, Khujand
Southwind Airlines	Seasonal charter: Istanbul
Ural Airlines	Baku, Dushanbe, Fergana, Khujand, Namangan, Osh, Qarshi, Samarqand, Tashkent, Urgench

=== Cargo ===
Airlines	Destinations
Suparna Airlines	Chengdu–Tianfu, Nanjing

== Ground transport ==
=== Rail ===
The nearest railway station to Zhukovsky Airport is Otdykh station. There is no direct rail connection between Moscow and the airport. Express electric train "Sputnik" from Moscow Kazansky railway station to Otdykh station with two stops. There are 26 services from 7:00 to 23:00 on weekdays at irregular intervals, no services at weekends. Travel time: 37 minutes. Passengers can also take an ordinary suburban train along Ryazanskiy direction to Otdykh station. Buses depart from Otdykh railway station to Zhukovsky airport. Departure 8 minutes after Sputnik arrival. Travel time: 20 minutes. From the Otdykh railway station, there are buses to the airport, interval: 30 minutes or by bus routes 2, 6 to the stop "Pereezd".

=== Bus ===
A direct route from Kotelniki station of the Moscow Metro to Zhukovsky International Airport is bus No. 441 "Kotelniki metro station" - "Airport Zhukovsky". The interval varies starting from 12 minutes depending on traffic, travel time 64 minutes.

== Accidents and incidents ==
- On 15 August 2019, Ural Airlines Flight 178, an Airbus A321 registered as VQ-BOZ, was scheduled to fly from Zhukovsky Airport to Simferopol, with 226 passengers and seven crew on board. The aircraft suffered a bird strike shortly after takeoff and made an emergency landing in a cornfield less than three nautical miles (six kilometres) from the runway with its landing gear up. Although 74 passengers sought medical treatment, only one major injury occurred, and all passengers survived.

== See also ==
- List of the busiest airports in Russia
- List of the busiest airports in Europe
- List of the busiest airports in the former USSR
