= Isfara Airport =

Airport

- IATA: none; ICAO: none

Summary
- Airport type: Public
- Operator: Government
- Serves: Isfara, Tajikistan
- Elevation AMSL: 2,814 ft (858 m)
- Coordinates: 40°07′18″N 070°39′55″E

Map
- Location of airport in Tajikistan

Runways
Direction	Length		Surface
Direction	m	ft	Surface
08/26	2,903	9,525	Asphalt
- Source: DAFIF

Isfara Airport (Russian: Аэропорт «Исфара́»; Tajik: Фурудгоҳи «Исфара») is an airport serving Isfara, a city in the Sughd province in northern Tajikistan.

== Facilities ==
The airport resides at an elevation of 2,814 feet (858 m) above mean sea level. It has one runway designated 08/26 with an asphalt surface measuring 2,903 by 44 metres (9,524 ft × 144 ft).
