= Dushanbe International Airport =

Airport in Dushanbe, Tajikistan

Dushanbe International Airport Tajik: Фурудгоҳи Байналмилалии Душанбе

- IATA: DYU; ICAO: UTDD

Summary
- Airport type: Joint (Civil and Military)
- Owner: Tajikistan
- Operator: Government of Tajikistan
- Serves: Dushanbe
- Location: Dushanbe, Tajikistan
- Hub for: Somon Air; Tajik Air
- Elevation AMSL: 2,575 ft (785 m)
- Coordinates: 38°32′6″N 068°49′5″E
- Website: airport.tj

Map
- Location of airport in Tajikistan

Runways
| Direction | Length | | Surface |
| Direction | ft | m | Surface |
|---|---|---|---|
| 09/27 | 10,210 | 3,112 | Asphalt-concrete |

Statistics (2025)
- Passengers: 2,160,248

Dushanbe International Airport (IATA: DYU, ICAO: UTDD) is an international airport in Dushanbe, the capital of Tajikistan. It is the main hub for Somon Air and is the home base for Tajik Air, which also has its headquarters on the property.

== History ==
On 7 September 1992, during the first months of the Tajikistani Civil War, President Rahmon Nabiyev and an entourage of his were on their way to the airport when they were ambushed by opposition forces. At the terminal, Nabiyev was forced to resign, practically at gunpoint, after a meeting and discussions with the armed opposition in the VIP lounge, before being released. Tanks and troops were reportedly stationed at the terminal during the whole ordeal.

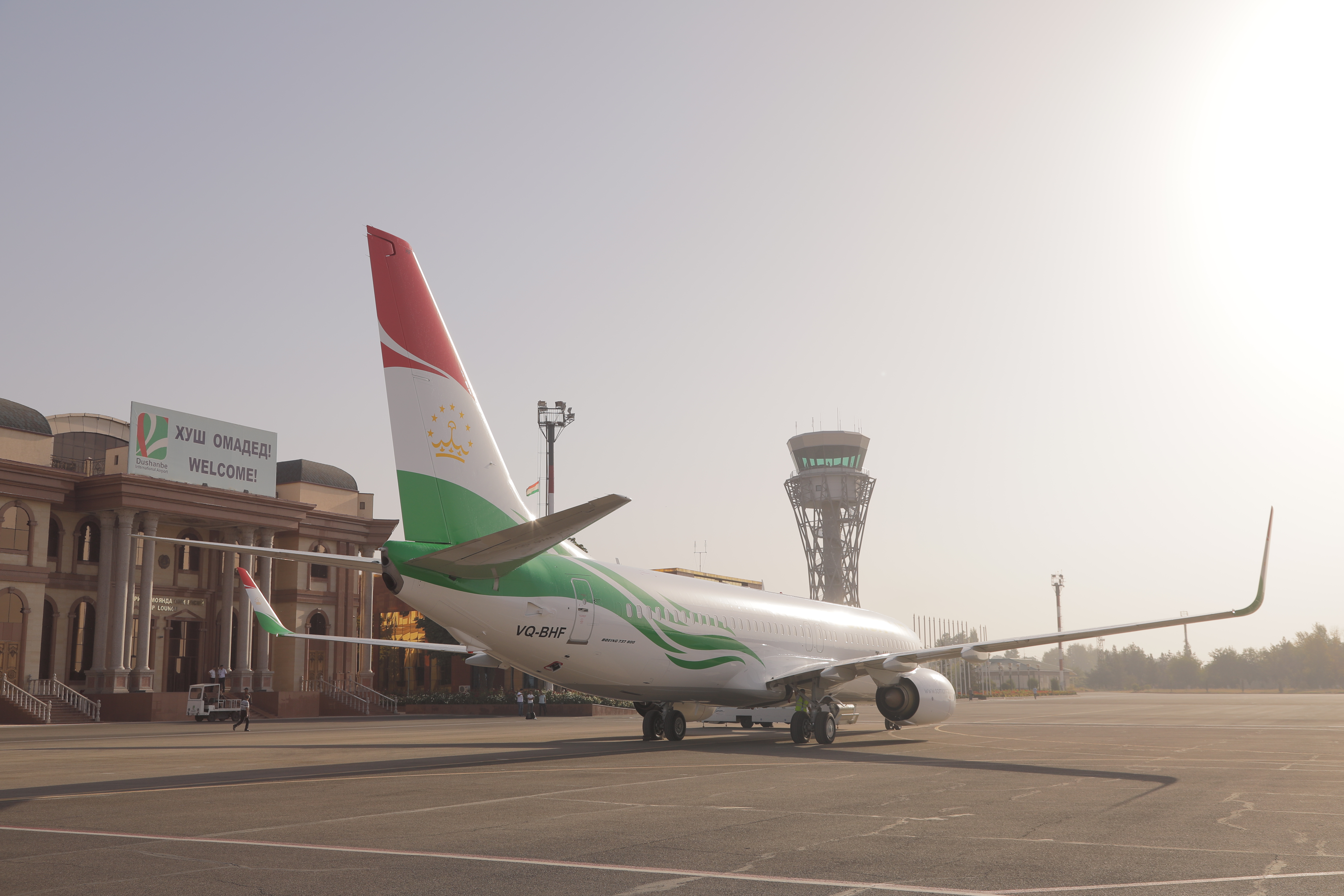
International Airport of Dushanbe, Tajikistan

A new French-built terminal, which can serve 1.5 million passengers a year, was opened on 3 September 2014. France provided Tajikistan a long-term, low-interest €20 million loan. Tajikistan's own contribution was €19 million.

=== New terminal ===
On October 9, 2026, President Emomali Rahmon and Dushanbe Mayor Rustam Emomali laid the foundation stone for a new terminal at Dushanbe International Airport. The facility is designed to handle 8.5 million passengers annually and is scheduled for completion in 1.5 years.

== Airlines and destinations ==
=== Passenger ===
| Airlines | Destinations |
|---|---|
| Air Astana | Almaty |
| Azerbaijan Airlines | Baku |
| Centrum Air | Tashkent |
| China Southern Airlines | Beijing–Daxing, Ürümqi, Xi'an |
| flydubai | Dubai–International |
| FlyOne | Yerevan |
| Jazeera Airways | Kuwait City |
| Kish Airlines | Seasonal charter: Kish |
| Loong Air | Xi'an |
| Nordwind Airlines | Ufa, Kazan, Tyumen |
| Raimon Airways | Mashhad |
| Red Wings Airlines | Makhachkala |
| Somon Air | Almaty, Astana, Bishkek–Manas, Delhi, Doha, Dubai–International, Islamabad, Istanbul, Jeddah, Kazan, Khujand, Krasnoyarsk–International, Makhachkala, Mineralnye Vody, Minsk, Moscow–Domodedovo, Moscow–Zhukovsky, Munich, Novosibirsk, Samara, Sochi, Tashkent, Tbilisi, Tehran–Imam Khomeini, Trabzon, Ufa, Ürümqi, Yekaterinburg; Seasonal charter: Sharm El Sheikh, |
| Tajik Air | Gharm, Khorog, Kulob, Panjakent, Rasht |
| Turkish Airlines | Istanbul |
| Ural Airlines | Krasnodar, Ufa,Moscow–Domodedovo,Samara, Yekaterinburg, Kazan, Krasnoyarsk–International, St. Petersburg, Moscow-Zhukovsky, Mineralnye Vody, Irkutsk, Sochi, Chelyabinsk |
| S7 Airlines | Novosibirsk |
| Uzbekistan Airways | Tashkent |
| Utair | Moscow Vnukovo |
| Varesh Airlines | Mashhad, Tehran–Imam Khomeini |

=== Cargo ===
| Airlines | Destinations |
|---|---|
| My Freighter | Tashkent |

== Technical data ==
The structure, located at an altitude of 785 m / 2575 ft above sea level, is equipped with a single terminal and a single landing runway with an asphalt surface, 3 112 m long and 45 m wide (10 170 × 147 ft) with 09/27 orientation.

The airport is also equipped with a 90 × 45 m stand for helicopters weighing up to 12 tons.

== See also ==
- Transport in Tajikistan
- List of the busiest airports in the former USSR
