= Khujand Airport =

Khujand International Airport Tajik: Фурудгоҳи Байналмилалии Хуҷанд
- IATA: LBD; ICAO: UTDL

Summary
- Airport type: Public
- Serves: Khujand
- Location: Chkalovsk, Tajikistan
- Hub for: Somon Air
- Elevation AMSL: 442 m (1,450 ft)
- Coordinates: 40°12′55″N 069°41′41″E

Map
- Location of airport in Tajikistan

Runways
Direction	Length		Surface
Direction	m	ft	Surface
08/26	3,200	10,499	Asphalt
08/26	1,650	5,413	Grass
- Source: AIP Tajikistan

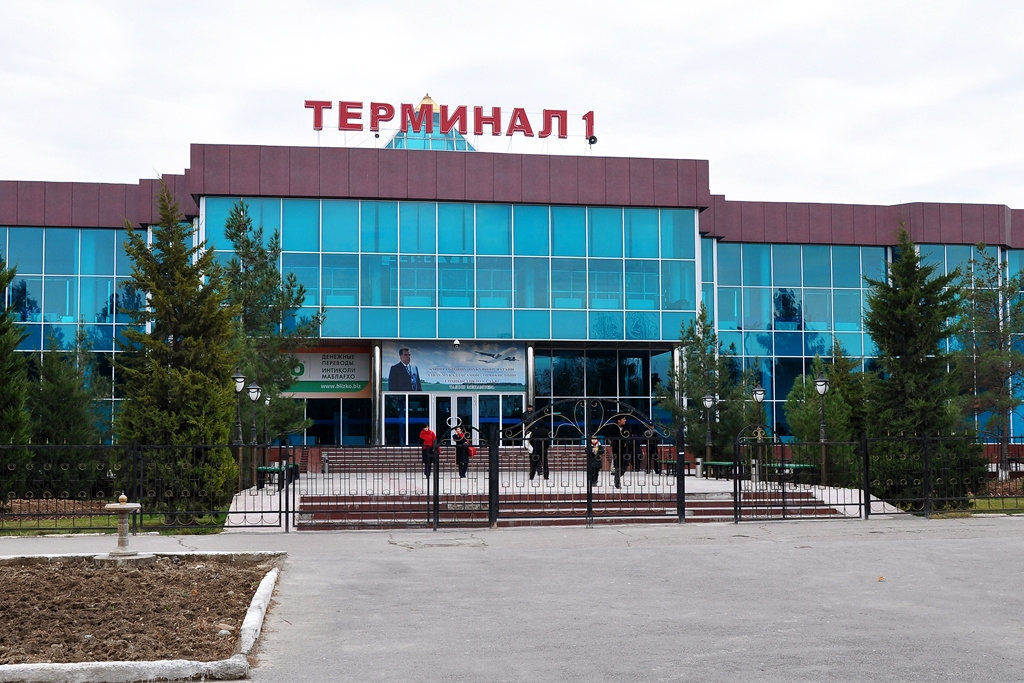
Old Terminal

Khujand International Airport (IATA: LBD, ICAO: UTDL) is an airport serving Khujand, the second-largest city in Tajikistan. Khujand was formerly known as Leninabad (during the Soviet era); hence the IATA code LBD. It is located out of the city, in the nearby town of Buston.

== Facilities ==
The airport resides at an elevation of 442 m above mean sea level. It has one runway designated 08/26 with an asphalt surface measuring 3,200 x 50 m.

The new passenger terminal was opened on 1 October 2019.

In 2024 the airport served 779,201 passengers, which is 22.1% less than in 2023 when 1,025,537 passengers were served.

== Airlines and destinations ==
Airlines	Destinations
Chengdu Airlines	Kashgar
Nordwind Airlines	Kazan, Tyumen, Ufa
S7 Airlines	Novosibirsk
Somon Air	Dushanbe, Moscow–Domodedovo, Surgut, Ürümqi
Ural Airlines	Chelyabinsk, Krasnoyarsk–Yemelyanovo, Mineralnye Vody, Moscow–Domodedovo, Moscow–Zhukovsky, Saint Petersburg, Samara, Yekaterinburg
Utair	Moscow–Vnukovo, Surgut, Tyumen
Yamal Airlines	Tyumen

== See also ==
- Transport in Tajikistan
- List of the busiest airports in the former USSR
