= Citrus (airline) =

Airline in Russia

| IATA | ICAO | Call sign |
|---|---|---|
| XT | CTU | CITY WINGS |
- Founded: 2021
- Ceased operations: June 2022
- Hubs: Kazan; Omsk
- Parent company: S7 Airlines
- Headquarters: Moscow, Russia
- Website: citrus.ru

Citrus was a planned Russian low-cost airline owned by S7 Airlines, with its headquarters in Moscow. The announcement from S7 to create a regional low-cost carrier was made in 2021. The airline's first flight was planned for July 2022, however, all plans have been suspended indefinitely.

== History ==
In 2008, S7 Airlines, a Russian carrier, founded a subsidiary airline, Globus. Globus and S7 merged at the end of 2019. In 2021 the S7 Group announced their plans to create a regional low-cost carrier. A competition was held to decide airline's name. By its end, the airline slogan was also announced: connecting cities of Russia — "Cities of Russia".

On 28 January 2022 an Airbus A319 (VP-BHP) with code CTU-8899 made its flight to receive certification from the Federal Air Transport Agency. On 9 February 2022 Citrus received the certificate from Globus. By 2024, the airline plans to have a fleet consisting of 24 aircraft. Ticket sales were planned to commence in April 2022 and the first regular flight was slated for July 2022.

In June 2022, shortly before its planned inaugural flight, S7 announced that they would be suspending the launch of Citrus indefinitely. Aircraft delivery issues due to the current sanctions against Russia was a contributory factor.

On 12 February 2026, it was reported that S7 Airlines was re-evaluating the possibility of launching a low-cost airline subsidiary, operating a fleet of Tupolev Tu-214 aircraft.

== Destinations ==
Citrus plans to have predominantly domestic network, outside Moscow, then followed by CIS countries.

| Country | City | Airport | Notes | Ref |
|---|---|---|---|---|
| Russia | Kazan | Kazan International Airport | Hub | |
| Russia | Omsk | Omsk Tsentralny Airport | Hub | |

== Fleet ==
Citrus fleet
| Aircraft | In service | Orders | Passengers | Notes |
| Airbus A320neo | – | 4 | TBD | Deliveries halted due to sanctions. |

== See also ==
- List of airlines of Russia
- Transport in Russia
