= Vnukovo Airlines Flight 2806 =

2001 aircraft hijacking

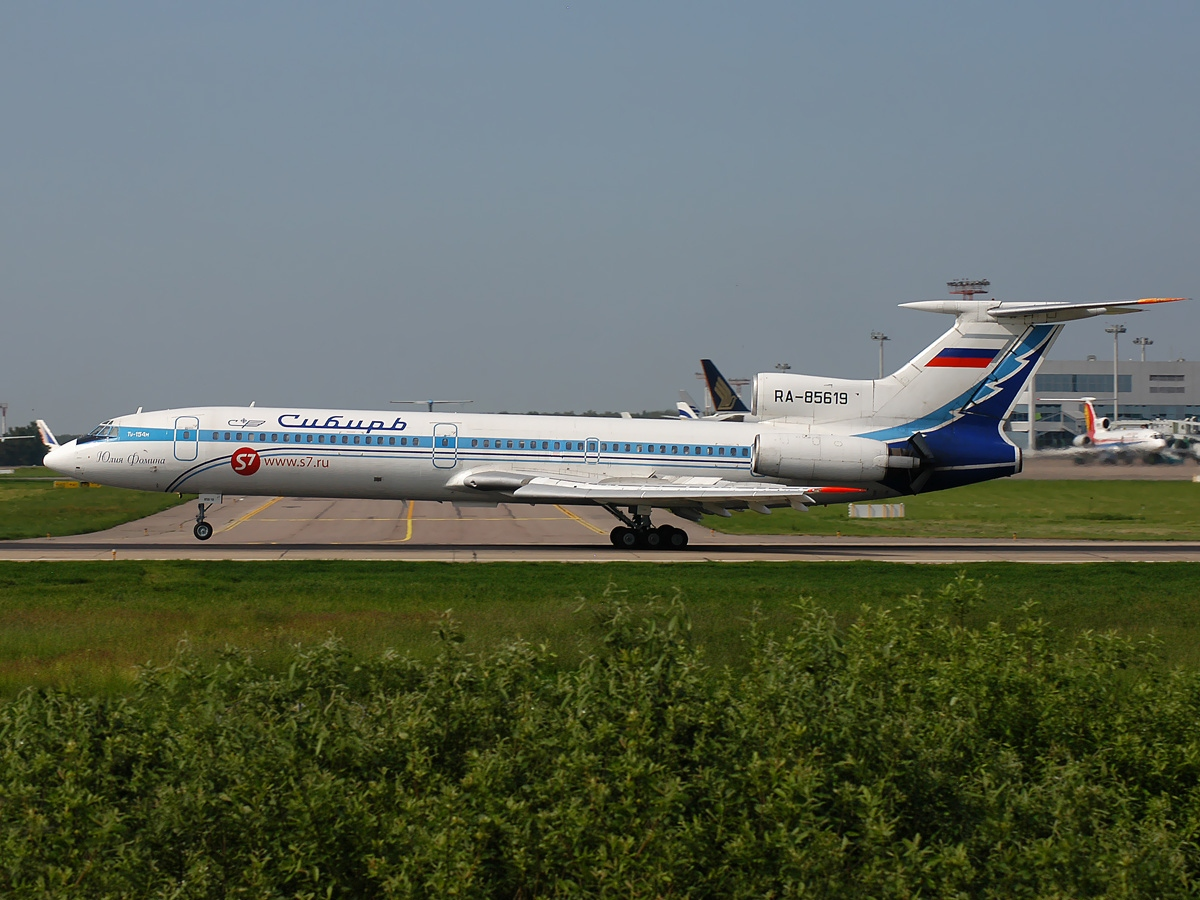
- The aircraft involved in the hijacking, now in operation with Siberia Airlines.

Act of terrorism
- Date: March 15, 2001 – March 16, 2001
- Summary: Hijacking of aircraft by Chechen terrorists and subsequent storming of aircraft by Saudi special forces after failed negotiations
- Site: Prince Mohammad bin Abdulaziz International Airport, Medina, Saudi Arabia

Aircraft
- Aircraft type: Tupolev Tu-154M
- Operator: Vnukovo Airlines
- Registration: RA-85619
- Flight origin: Istanbul Atatürk International Airport, Istanbul, Turkey
- Destination: Vnukovo International Airport, Moscow, Russia
- Occupants: 174
- Passengers: 162
- Crew: 12
- Fatalities: 3 (including 1 hijacker)
- Injuries: 6
- Survivors: 171

Vnukovo Airlines Flight 2806 was an act of terrorism carried out by three Chechens from March 15 to March 16, 2001. During the incident, a Tu-154M airliner of Vnukovo Airlines performing flight VKO-2806 from Istanbul to Moscow was hijacked. The hijacked plane landed at Prince Mohammad bin Abdulaziz International Airport in Medina, Saudi Arabia. The aircraft was freed following a special forces operation by Saudi Arabia. Three people were killed — one passenger, a flight attendant, and the terrorist leader. It would be the final hijacking where the hijackers did not plan to kill themselves prior to the September 11 attacks. The hijackers were led by Supyan Arsaev, who was accompanied by his two sons.

== Background ==
=== Aircraft ===
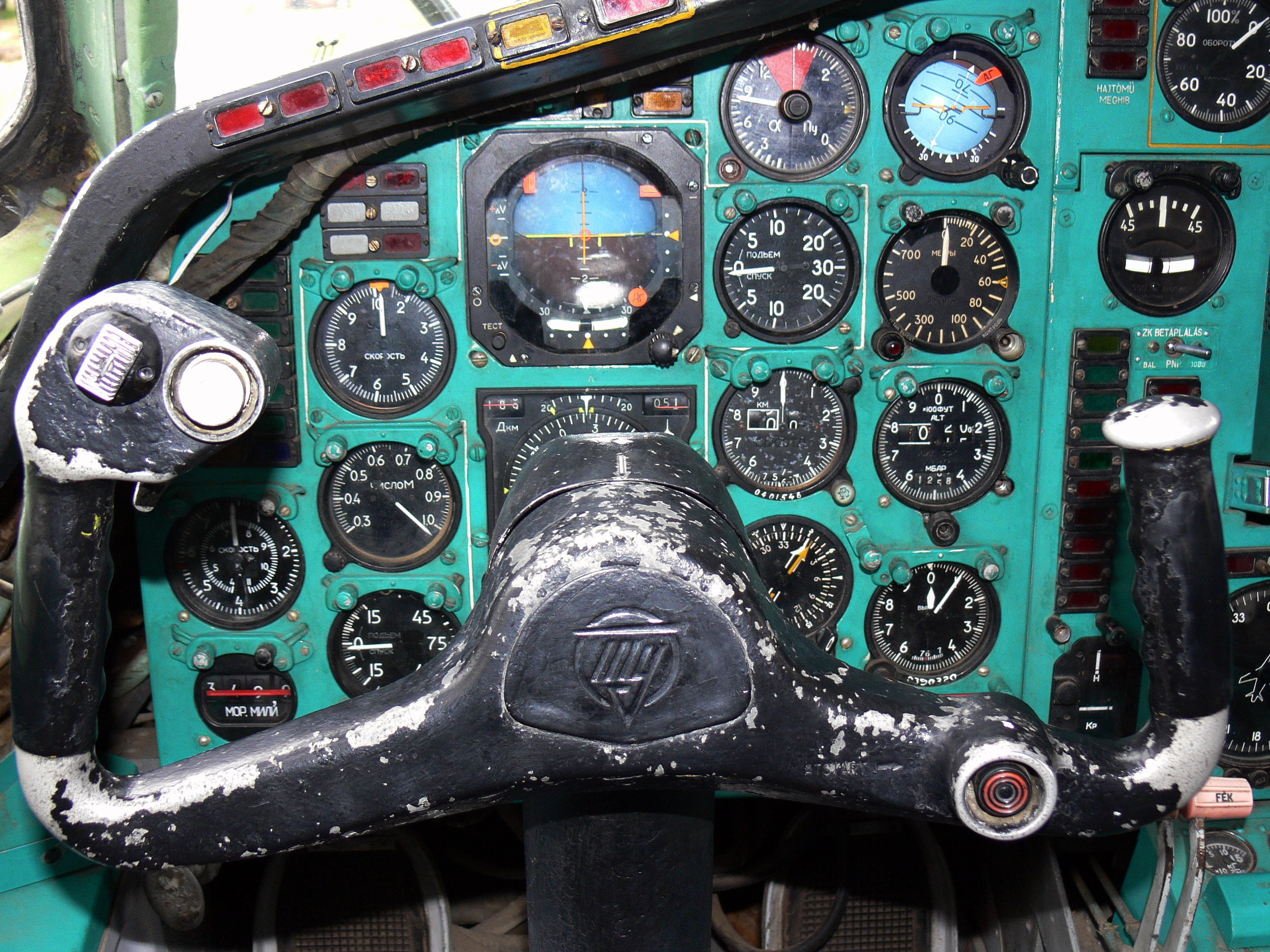
Cockpit of a Tupolev Tu-154, similar to the one aboard RA-85619. The crew held the cockpit door shut manually for 22 hours during the hijacking.

The Tu-154M was manufactured by the Aviakor plant in Samara on November 12, 1986.

From 1986 to 1993, the aircraft belonged to Aeroflot, from 1993 to 1995 to Meta Aviotransport Macedonia, from 1996 to 2000 to Vnukovo Airlines, and from 2002 to 2012 to Sibir (S7 Airlines).

It was scrapped in April 2012 with a total resource of about 50,000 flight hours and 26 years of operation.

=== Crew ===
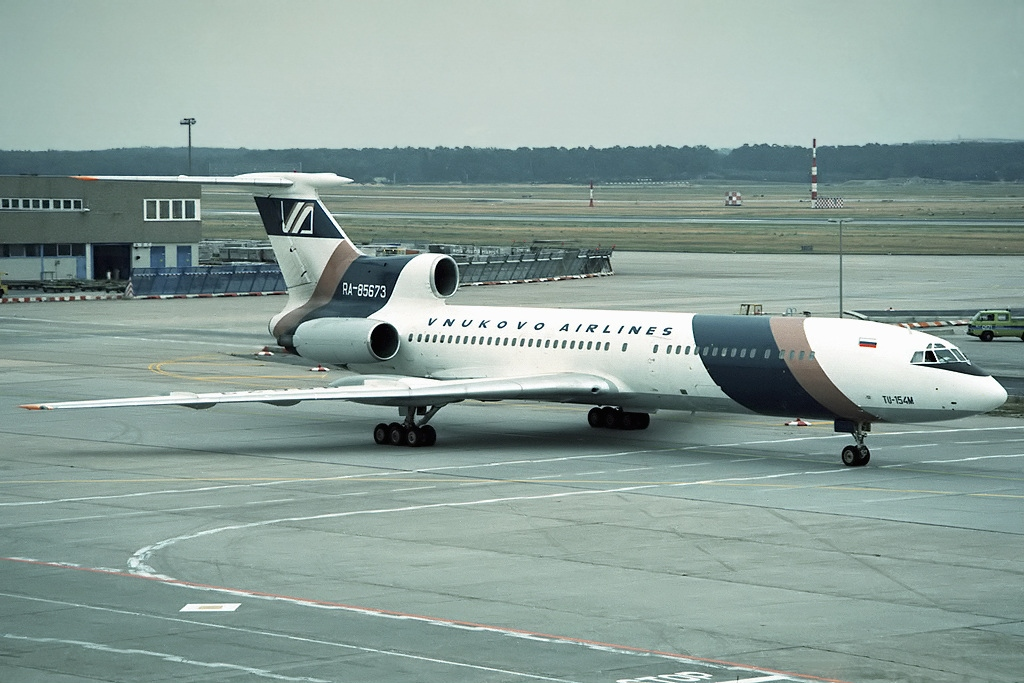
A Vnukovo Airlines Tupolev Tu-154M, similar to the aircraft used on Flight 2806.

The crew of flight VKO-2806 consisted of:

- Captain — Nikolay Sergeevich Vinogradov, who had logged 13,000 flight hours in his 30 years as a pilot at that time
- First officer — Sergey Borisovich Vorobyov
- Flight navigator — Sergey Olegovich Kozhevnikov
- Flight navigator-instructor — Gennady Semyonovich Chernitenko
- Flight engineer — Andrey Borisovich Guselnikov
- Flight attendants:
  - Nikolay Yuryevich Dmitriev (senior flight attendant and inspector, head of the flight attendant service of the airline)
  - Yuliya Vyacheslavovna Fomina
  - Aleksandr Alekseevich Khromov
  - Elena Aleksandrovna Dubinina
  - Svetlana Serafimovna Ivaniv

The crew also included two ground service engineers.

This flight became the last for captain Vinogradov before retirement, as he was left with health issues, including post-traumatic stress disorder, after the hijacking.

=== Hijackers ===
There were three hijackers on board:

- 45-year-old Supyan Arsaev — the leader of the terrorists. A first-degree invalid and younger brother of the former Minister of Sharia State Security of Ichkeria, Aslanbek Arsaev.
- 19-year-old Deni (Denis) Magomerzaev — son of Supyan Arsaev (he bore his mother's surname).
- 16-year-old Iriskhan Arsaev — son of Supyan Arsaev.

Among the passengers, there were up to five accomplices of the terrorists. They did not actively participate in the hijacking but monitored the course of the terrorist attack. In particular, a person later identified as Turkish terrorist Ertan Coşkun, who participated in the hijacking of the Russian ferry Avrasaya in 1996, was on board. According to Russian intelligence representatives and Alexander Khinshtein, the National Intelligence Organization of Turkey might have been involved in organizing the hijacking.

The terrorists were armed with a stiletto knife, which was smuggled in the heel of Supyan Arsaev's boot. They also possibly had an explosive device disguised as a video recorder box, which someone from Istanbul airport staff brought on board.

== Incident ==
=== Hijacking ===
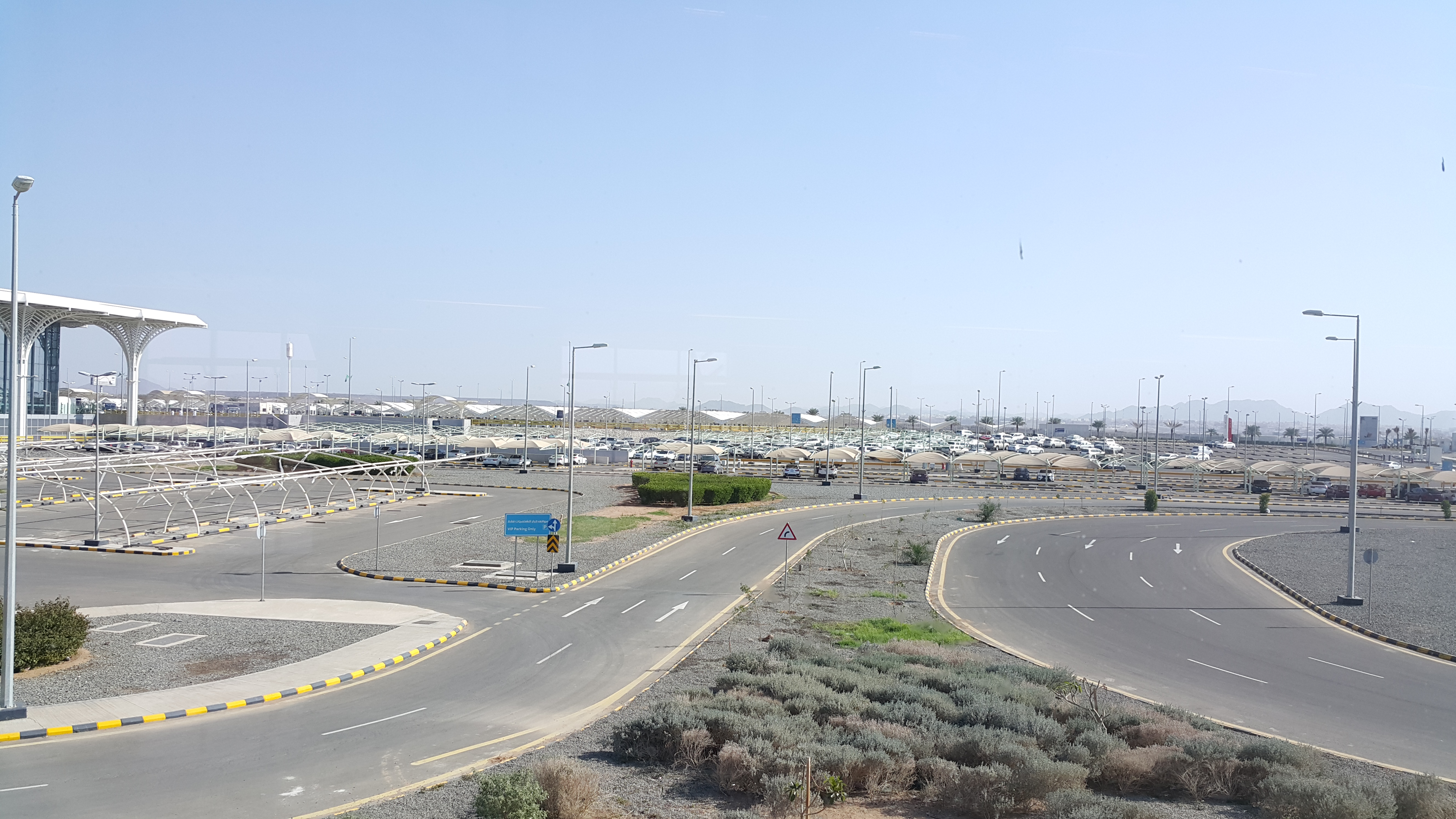
Prince Mohammad bin Abdulaziz International Airport in Medina, where the hijacked Tu-154 was forced to land.

On March 15, 2001, a Tu-154M aircraft with tail number RA-85619 operated by Vnukovo Airlines performed charter flight VKO-2806 from Istanbul to Moscow on behalf of the travel company "Pan-Ukraine". At 14:57 Moscow time, the aircraft took off from Istanbul Atatürk International Airport. On board were 164 (according to other sources, 162) passengers (including 98 Russian nationals) and 12 crew members. A few minutes after takeoff, while the airliner was still gaining altitude, the two Arsaevs, who were seated in row 7, got up from their seats and headed towards the cockpit. Flight attendants Khromov and Dmitriev, whom the hijackers asked to convey their demands to the crew, attempted to resist. As a result, Supyan Arsaev stabbed Khromov in the abdomen with a stiletto, while Dmitriev managed to escape to the cockpit and warn the flight crew of the danger. The cockpit door lock was faulty, so to prevent the terrorists from breaking in, the crew members in the cockpit took turns holding the door handle manually for the next 22 hours.

The terrorists ordered the passengers to stay in their seats and not resist, threatening to detonate a bomb, the dummy fuse of which was in the hands of Iriskhan Arsaev. They announced that the bomb was with a fourth terrorist, who was supposedly among the passengers, but in reality, either did not exist or did not reveal themselves until the end of the hijacking operation. The hijackers broke into the aircraft's fire extinguisher compartment and armed themselves with two small axes from the inventory. They also took knives from the galley. The hijackers contacted the pilots via intercom and demanded access to the cockpit. The crew sent a distress signal and attempted to return for an emergency landing in Istanbul, descending to 400 metres (1,300 ft), however, the landing approach was unsuccessful because the hijackers noticed the maneuver and threatened to blow up the plane. Later, Arsaev demanded the plane be redirected to Saudi Arabia or the United Arab Emirates.

=== Further flight ===
Having refused to allow the hijackers into the cockpit for their safety, the captain offered to land at an airport in any of the nearby Muslim countries for the terrorists to present their demands to the authorities on the ground. However, Arsaev reiterated that the plane must land only in Saudi Arabia or the UAE. The hijacked plane took a southeast course. Learning of the course change, the terrorists calmed down and stopped trying to break into the cockpit. The plane flew 2,500 kilometres (1,600 miles) through the airspace of Turkey, Cyprus, Egypt, and Saudi Arabia in search of a suitable airport for landing. Unwilling to take responsibility for the hostage rescue, the authorities of Egypt, Israel and Syria refused to allow the plane to land on their territory.

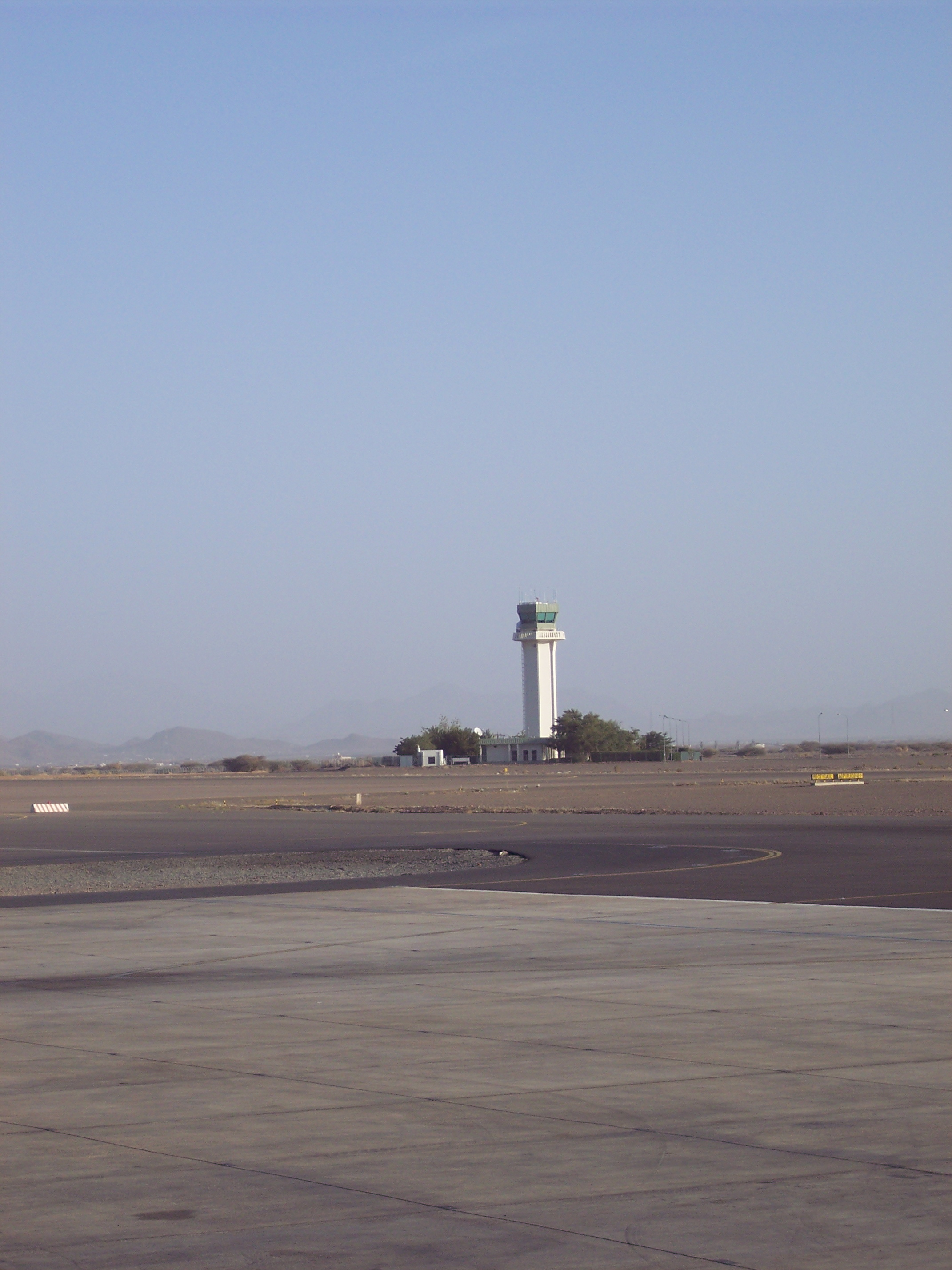
The control tower at Prince Mohammad bin Abdulaziz International Airport. Air traffic controllers initially threatened to have the Tu-154 shot down

Three hours into the flight, the aircraft was low on fuel, and it became clear to the crew that an immediate landing was necessary. The nearest airport was Prince Mohammad bin Abdulaziz International Airport in the Saudi city of Medina. The crew used auxiliary onboard GPS data and the onboard computer, as they had no navigation charts of the area. The authorities of Saudi Arabia also did not want to deal with the terrorists and refused the plane's request to land. Moreover, Medina is a holy city for Muslims, and non-Muslim presence is strictly prohibited. Air traffic controllers threatened to shoot down the Tu-154 with air defense fighters if it did not immediately leave Saudi airspace. The commander and navigator managed to explain that there were no other options for landing, and if the plane crashed, the responsibility would fall on the Saudi aviation authorities. The controller finally gave in, and the crew miraculously landed at the unfamiliar airport. The airport is in a mountainous area with complex approaches, and none of the pilots had ever been there. Nevertheless, at 18:20 Moscow time, the Tu-154 successfully landed in Medina. There were 1.5 tons of kerosene left in the tanks, enough for another 10–12 minutes of flight.

=== On the ground ===
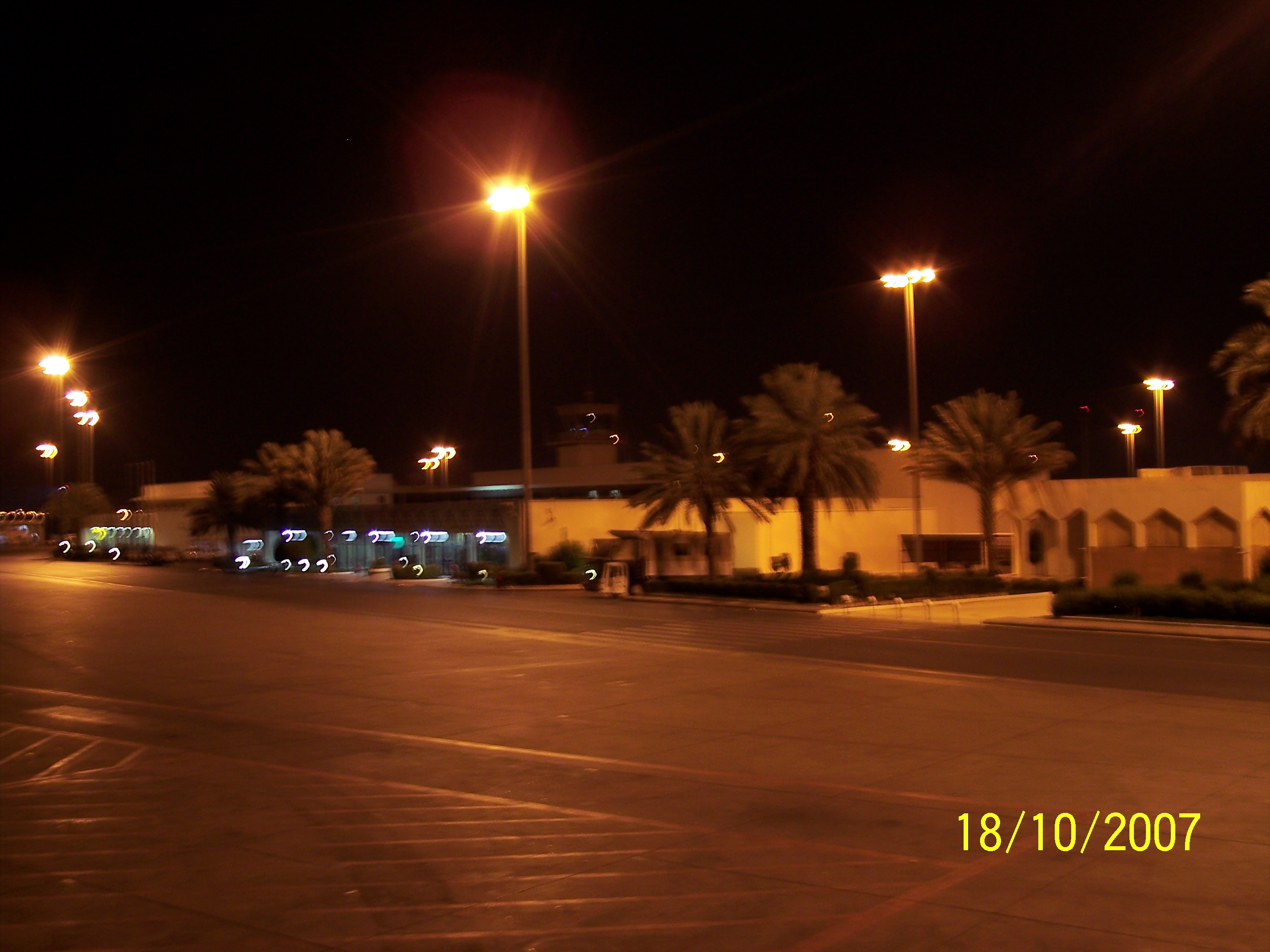
Terminal building at Prince Mohammad bin Abdulaziz International Airport in Medina.

Medina airport was immediately closed, and the Russian airliner was moved to a remote stand. Supyan Arsaev again demanded that the hijackers be allowed into the cockpit so that they could transmit their demands via radio, to which the crew again refused. Despite repeated threats to kill flight attendant Yuliya Fomina and the other hostages, and to detonate an explosive device on board, the crew did not open the door to the cockpit. The hijackers were forced to negotiate with the Saudi authorities through the open entry door. They demanded an end to the fighting in Chechnya. Arsaev explained that the Russian authorities had taken everything from him with the Second Chechen War: they killed his relatives, bombed his house, and left him disabled. The hijackers wanted to draw the world's attention to the Chechen issue. Arsayev's immediate demands included the prompt refueling of the aircraft and the guarantee of its unimpeded departure for Afghanistan.

After food and a radio were delivered to the hijackers, they allowed 20 passengers (the sick, elderly, women, and children) to leave the plane, as well as the unconscious flight attendant Aleksandr Khromov. Since the airport was extremely hot with a temperature of +54 °C (129 °F), the hijackers allowed the flight attendants to open all the doors. Using this, about 15 passengers managed to escape through an emergency exit in the rear. However, the hijackers wounded three passengers in retaliation to demonstrate the seriousness of their intentions. Realizing the passengers' escape, the terrorists locked all the hatches and doors, leaving only the one near the cockpit open. After another passenger, a Turkish citizen, escaped at night (under the pretext of smoking), the hijackers also closed this door. The aircraft's overheating could only be alleviated at night, after connecting an air conditioning unit. As a result of the negotiations, representatives of Saudi Arabia stated that the hijackers' demands were unfulfillable and that they would not allow the plane to continue its flight.

The pilots maintained communication with Moscow through HF channels from the beginning of the hijacking. In Moscow, an operational headquarters was created, headed by the first deputy director of the FSB Vladimir Pronichev. Alpha Group fighters prepared to fly to Medina, but Turkey, Egypt, and Saudi Arabia did not permit the arrival of Russian special forces. Saudi authorities guaranteed Vladimir Putin that they could carry out the hostage rescue on their own and that they would not let the plane leave Medina. At night, Putin personally contacted the crew (while he was on a recreational trip to Altai) and promised to do everything possible, asking them not to succumb to the terrorists' threats and not to take off.

By morning, the plane was surrounded by Saudi Arabian special forces. As the aircraft was Russian property, Saudi authorities sought Russian consent to conduct the operation. According to the head of the operational headquarters Vladimir Pronichev, such permission was granted. The rehearsal was held at night on another Tu-154, provided by Sibir Airlines. To mislead the hijackers, the plane was refueled, creating the illusion that it would soon be allowed to depart. The first attempt to storm the aircraft failed as the terrorists saw the approaching military and began breaking down the cockpit door. At the crew's request, the special forces retreated. After another refueling, the crew simulated engine start. There were 117 hostages still remaining on board.

=== Assault operation and hostage rescue ===
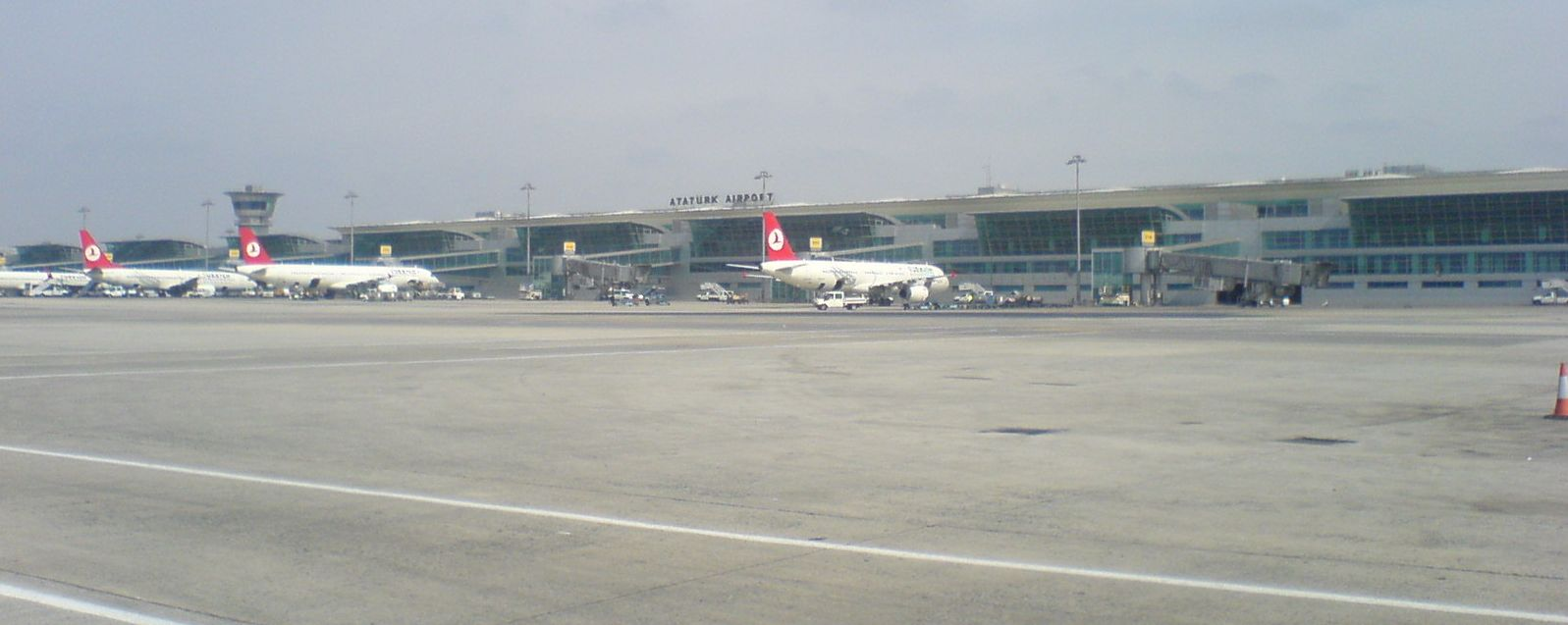
Istanbul Atatürk International Airport, from which Flight 2806 departed on March 15, 2001.

At 12:15 Moscow time on March 16, special forces surrounded the plane again and began preparations for the assault. The terrorists started banging on the cockpit door, demanding immediate takeoff. Under continuous blows, the door began to break, leading the dispatcher to order the crew to leave the cockpit. Barely holding the door, all five crew members managed to escape through the emergency hatch, with minor injuries to flight engineer Andrey Guselnikov and captain Nikolay Vinogradov.

At this time, self-propelled ladders with special forces in black masks and bulletproof vests armed with short-barreled rifles approached the plane. They attacked from four directions simultaneously. The first group went through the cockpit, using the rope the crew had escaped with. The second group entered through the main exit between the cabins. The third group entered through the rear hatch from which passengers had previously escaped. The fourth group landed on the wing and planned to enter the cabin through emergency windows.

The special forces hesitated to open the hatches, so the group from the cockpit was the first to storm the cabin. A special forces member shot Supyan Arsaev, who stood in the front vestibule, at point-blank range. One of the bullets hit Turkish passenger Gurzel Kambal in the abdomen. Both men died on the way to the hospital.

Panic ensued, and passengers rushed to the rear of the plane. The other special forces groups were unable to open the exits. 27-year-old flight attendant Yuliya Fomina came to their aid. Squeezing through the crowd to the door, she opened it and was immediately shot: a special forces soldier presumably aimed at a passenger behind Fomina, who was trying to lay her down, mistaking him for a terrorist, but accidentally hit Fomina instead. Fomina died at age 27 from a neck wound.

By 13:00, the operation was concluded. The two remaining hijackers were arrested without resistance. Five Russian citizens suspected of aiding them were detained but later released. The special forces reportedly suffered one killed and several injured, but Saudi authorities did not confirm this information.

== Aftermath ==
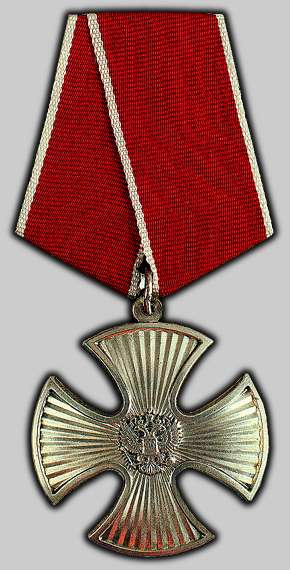
The Order of Courage, awarded to captain Vinogradov, flight engineer Guselnikov, flight attendant Khromov, and posthumously to Yuliya Fomina.

Fifty Turkish citizens on board were sent to Istanbul on a Turkish Airlines plane, including suspected accomplices. The next day, March 17, at 17:13, an Il-62 from Rossiya Airlines returned to Russia with 121 people — passengers from Russia and CIS countries, crew members, and the body of Yuliya Fomina. Upon arrival, 28 people sought medical help. On March 19, after maintenance, the Tu-154M returned to Moscow. The same day, Yuliya Fomina was buried at Pykhtino cemetery in Vnukovo.

Russian President Vladimir Putin stated at a Kremlin meeting that the tragedy during the release of hostages from the hijacked Tu-154, resulting in the deaths of two innocent people, "reminded the Russian and international community of whom the Russian army was dealing with during the counter-terrorist operation in Chechnya and who law enforcement and special services are dealing with now in establishing constitutional order in that republic".

For their courage, bravery, and professionalism, the Tu-154 crew members received state awards. Initially, Vinogradov was nominated for the title Hero of Russia, but he was later awarded the Order of Courage, which was also awarded to Andrey Guselnikov, Aleksandr Khromov, and posthumously to Yuliya Fomina. Sergey Vorobyov, Nikolay Dmitriev, Elena Dubinina, Svetlana Ivaniv, Sergey Kozhevnikov, and Gennady Chernitenko received the Medal "For Courage".

The Russian Prosecutor General's office initially did not press for the extradition of the hijackers, for one, because it was assumed that they would receive the death sentence under Sharia law, and secondly, there is no extradition treaty between Russia and Saudi Arabia. In July 2002, the Sharia court of Saudi Arabia sentenced the surviving terrorists. Despite the death penalty for terrorism in Saudi Arabia, the court handed lenient sentences: Deni (Denis) Magomerzaev received six years in prison, and Iriskhan Arsaev four years. The Russian Prosecutor General's Office disagreed with the Sharia court's decision: "We believe this sentence is too lenient and inappropriate for the gravity of the crime committed." The Prosecutor General's Office considered the possibility of asking Saudi authorities to extradite the hijackers. However, it was expected that they would likely spend their prison sentences in Saudi Arabia after all, because even under Russian law their sentences would likely only be 2–3 years longer than the Sharia court sentence for neither of the two could be charged as the organizer of the hijack — they were merely carrying out orders of the leader Supyan Arsaev.Supyan Arsaev was buried in Saudi Arabia with the help of the Chechen diaspora.
