= Enkor =

Russian airline

Enkor Энкор
| IATA | ICAO | Call sign |
|---|---|---|
| G8(G5) | ENK | ENKOR |
- Founded: 1997
- Ceased operations: 2004 merged with Siberia Airlines
- Hubs: Chelyabinsk
- Secondary hubs: Moscow-Domodedovo
- Focus cities: Ulan-Ude
- Headquarters: Chelyabinsk, Russia

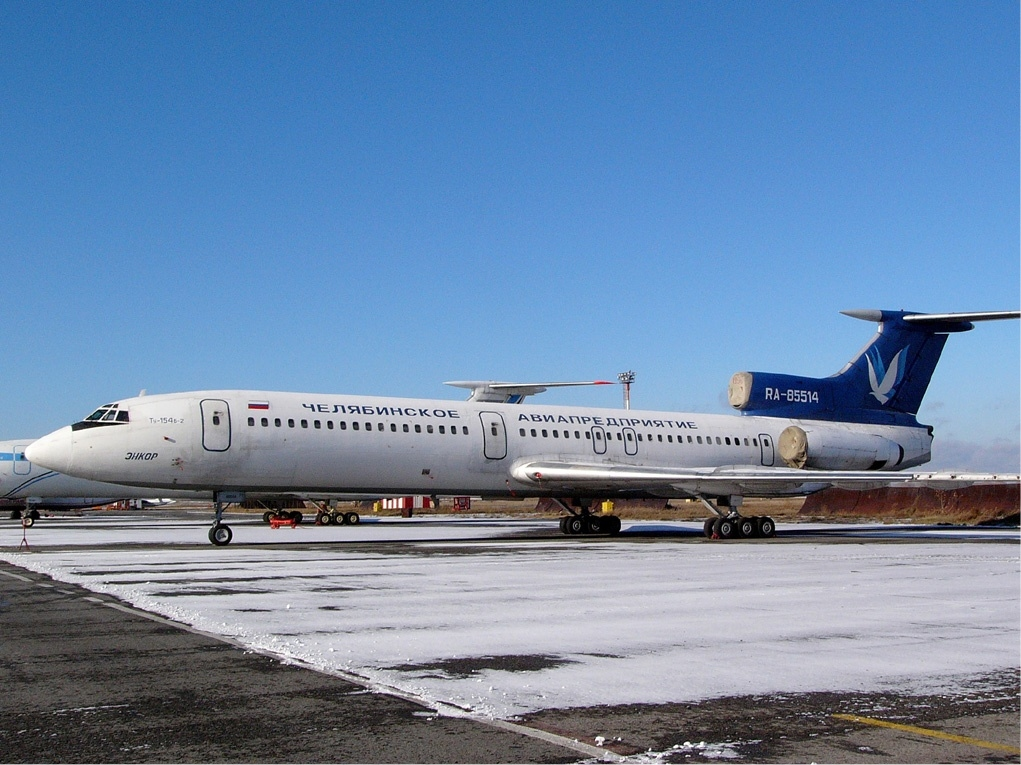
Enkor Tupolev Tu-154, Tolmachevo, 2004

Enkor (full name is Joint Stock Company (JSC) Enkor) was an airline based in Moscow, Russia. It operated scheduled international passenger services and provided technical aircraft maintenance. Its main bases were Domodedovo International Airport, Moscow, Ulan Ude Airport (UUD) and Chelyabinsk Airport (CEK). In 2004, the airline merged with S7 which inherited their fleet of TU-154M aircraft. The TU-134 and Yakovlev Yak-42 aircraft were retired and the TU-154B2 was sold to Kolavia.

== History ==
The airline was established on 18 November 1997 and started operations in February 1998. It is owned by Open JSC Chelyabinsk Air Enterprise (50.15%), Colentra Leasing Enterprises, Nicosia, Cyprus (48.31%) and the remainder by Closed JSC Tandem Agency and Closed JSC Chelyabinsk Insurance Company.

In 2001, Enkor merged with Siberian Airlines.

== Services ==
Enkor operated the following services (at January 2005):

- Domestic scheduled destinations: Adler/Sochi, Chelyabinsk, Mirnyj, Novosibirsk and Saint Petersburg.
- International scheduled destinations: Almaty, Baky, Bishkek, Dushanbe, Khujand, Öskemen and Yerevan.

== Fleet ==
The Enkor fleet consisted of the following aircraft (at January 2005):

- 3 Tupolev Tu-134A
- 1 Tupolev Tu-154B-2
- 6 Tupolev Tu-154M (two were received from Bural)
- 2 Yakovlev Yak-42D
