= Vnukovo Airlines =

Russian airline

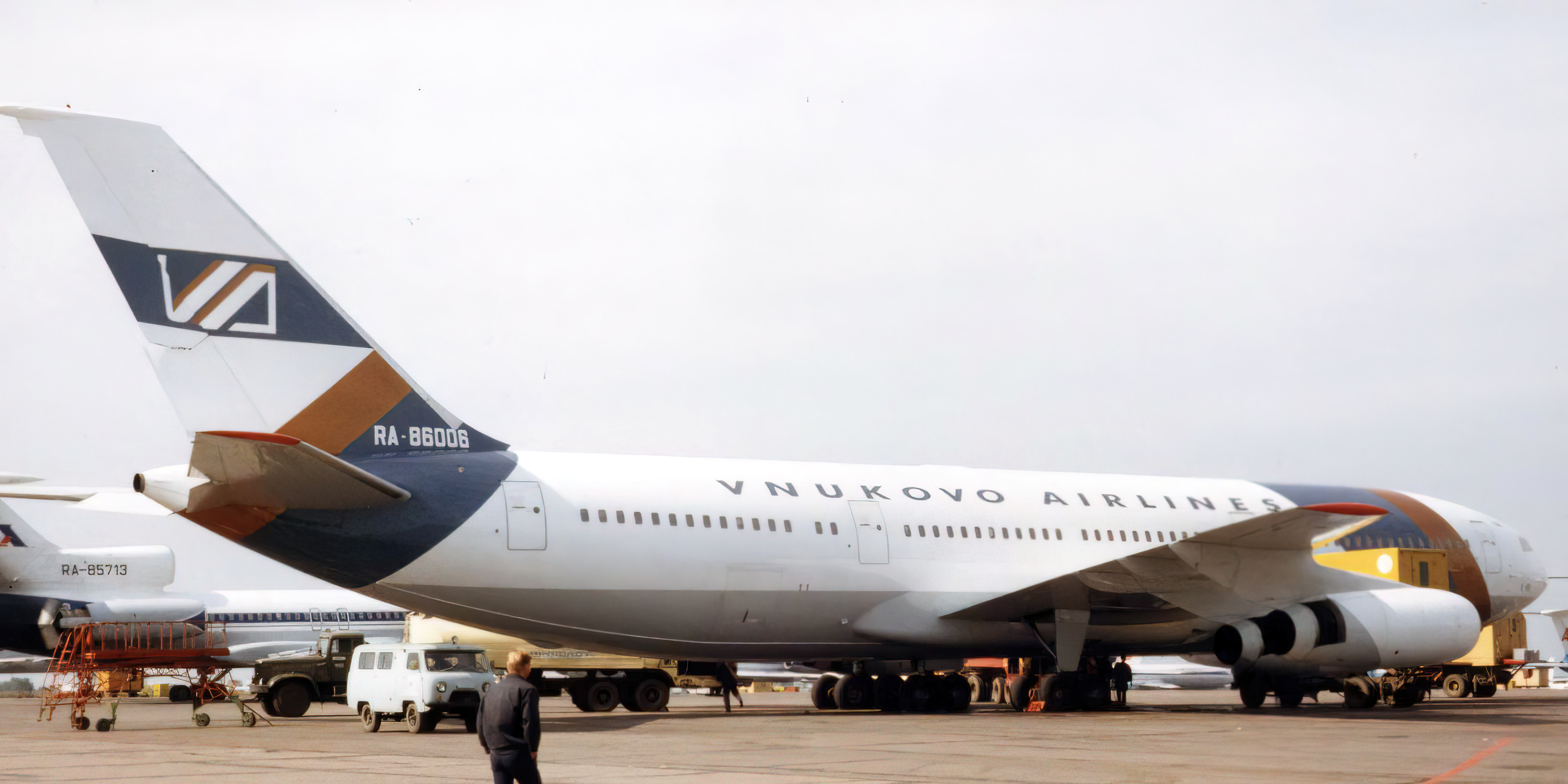
IATA	ICAO	Call sign
V5	VKO	VNUKOVO
- Founded: 1993
- Commenced operations: 1994
- Ceased operations: 2001 (merged with Siberian Airlines)
- Operating bases: Vnukovo International Airport
- Headquarters: Moscow, Russia
- Key people: Alexander Krasnenker (CEO)

Vnukovo Airlines (Russian: Внуковские авиалинии or Vnukovskie Aviallnii) was a Russian airline which had its corporate headquarters at Vnukovo International Airport in Moscow. It was created as a spin-off from the Vnukovo Airport division of Aeroflot in March 1993 and operated until 2001, when it was bought by Siberian Airlines.

Passenger aircraft types operated by the airline on scheduled flights from Vnukovo included the Ilyushin Il-86 and the Tupolev Tu-154.

== History ==
The airline commenced operations in 1994 as Vnukovo Air Enterprise, which had been spun off from Aeroflot. It became one of the biggest charter airlines in Russia in the 1990s, serving nearly 100 destinations in various cities and countries. The airline was also the launch customer for the Tupolev Tu-204.

In 1997, Siberia Airlines (now known as S7 Airlines) tried to buy the airline in order to make Moscow its next main hub, but was unsuccessful. After the 1998 Russian financial crisis, the airline was in danger of bankruptcy and Siberia Airlines suggested a merger, but was again rebuffed. In 1999 Siberia Airlines signed a letter of intent to take over Vnukovo Airlines in the event Vnukovo ceased its operations. Vnukovo went bankrupt in 2001 and the Siberia Airlines takeover went ahead.

== Fleet ==
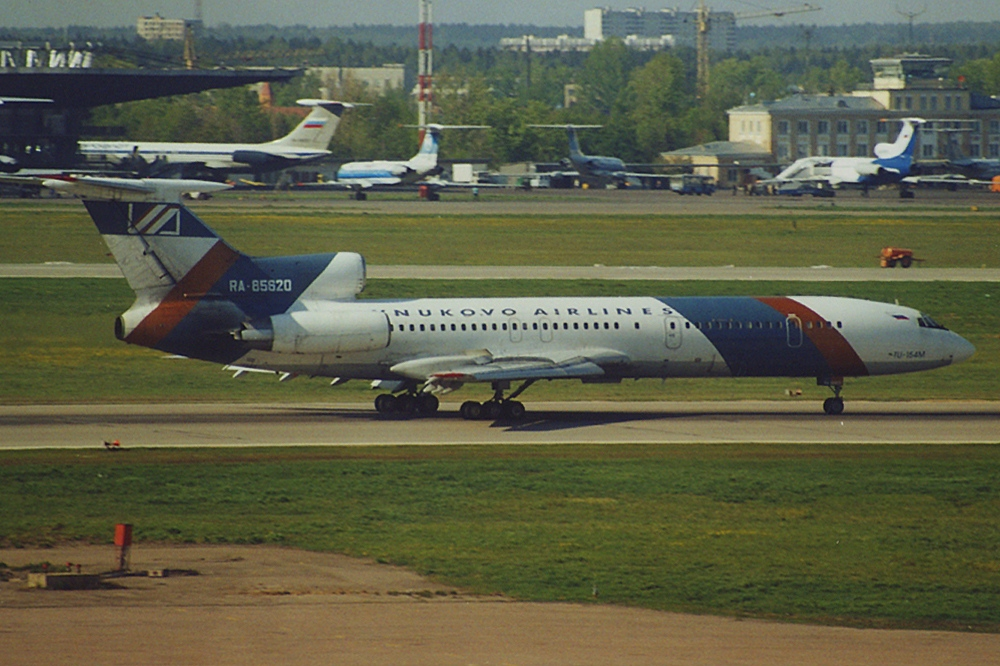
Vnukovo Airlines Tupolev Tu-154 at Sheremetyevo International Airport.

Vnukovo Airlines fleet history
Aircraft	Number
Ilyushin Il-86	18
Tupolev Tu-154	16
Tupolev Tu-204	2

== Accidents and incidents ==
- On 25 December 1993, an Aeroflot Tupolev Tu-154 leased by Vnukovo Airlines was operating from Moscow to Grozny. The aircraft was damaged when its nose landing gear collapsed on landing in bad weather conditions. None of the 172 passengers and crew on board were injured.
- On 29 August 1996, the airline was involved in Norway's deadliest aviation accident, when Vnukovo Airlines Flight 2801 crashed during approach to Svalbard Airport, Longyear, killing all 141 people on board.
- On 11 November 2000, a Tupolev Tu-154 operating from Mahachkala to Moscow as Flight 838 was taken over by a lone hijacker, who forced the crew to fly the aircraft to Israel. The aircraft was allowed to land at an Israeli military base, where the hijacker surrendered. None of the 59 passengers and crew on board were injured.
- On 15 March 2001, a Tupolev Tu-154 on a non-scheduled flight from Istanbul to Moscow as Flight 2806 was taken over by three Chechen hijackers, who had the crew fly the aircraft to Saudi Arabia. The Tu-154 landed at Medina, where 47 hostages, including a flight attendant who had been fatally stabbed in the beginning of the hijacking, were released the next day. The Saudi military later stormed the aircraft after the hijackers threatened to blow it up. The plane was renamed "Yulia Fomina" after the stewardess killed by hijackers.

== See also ==
- Domodedovo Airlines
- List of defunct airlines of Russia
- Babyflot
