= S7 Airlines =

Airline of Russia

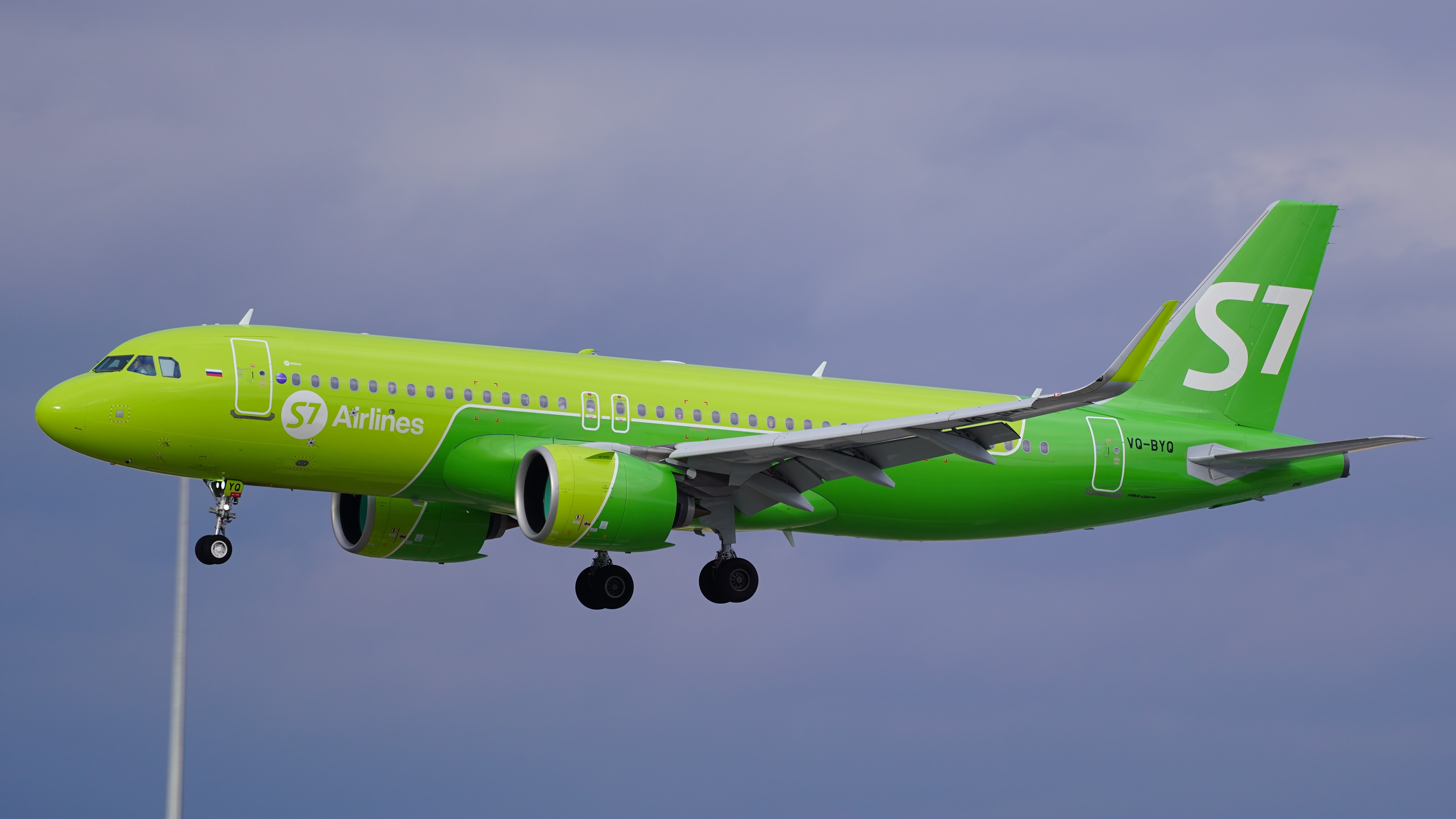
- An Airbus A320neo of S7 Airlines
IATA	ICAO	Call sign
S7	SBI	SIBERIAN AIRLINES
- Founded: May 1957; 69 years ago (as Tolmachevsky squadron)
- Commenced operations: May 1992; 34 years ago (as Siberia Airlines)
- Hubs: Moscow–Domodedovo; Novosibirsk–Tolmachevo
- Focus cities: Irkutsk; Vladivostok
- Frequent-flyer program: S7 Priority
- Alliance: Oneworld (suspended)
- Subsidiaries: S7 Cargo; S7 Training
- Fleet size: 104
- Destinations: 77
- Parent company: S7 AirSpace Corporation
- Headquarters: Ob, Novosibirsk Oblast, Russia
- Key people: Igor Valerievich Mel’khov (General Director)
- Employees: 3,000
- Website: s7.ru

S7 Airlines, legal name JSC Siberia Airlines (Russian: АО «Авиакомпания "Сибирь"», "АО Aviakompania Sibir"), is an airline headquartered in Ob, Novosibirsk Oblast, Russia, with offices in Moscow. As of 2008, it was Russia's largest domestic airline, with its main bases at Domodedovo International Airport and Tolmachevo Airport. It is a member of the Oneworld alliance, but its membership has been suspended since 2022 due to Russia's invasion of Ukraine. It is also currently banned from flying into the EU like all other Russian airlines.

== History ==
=== Early years ===
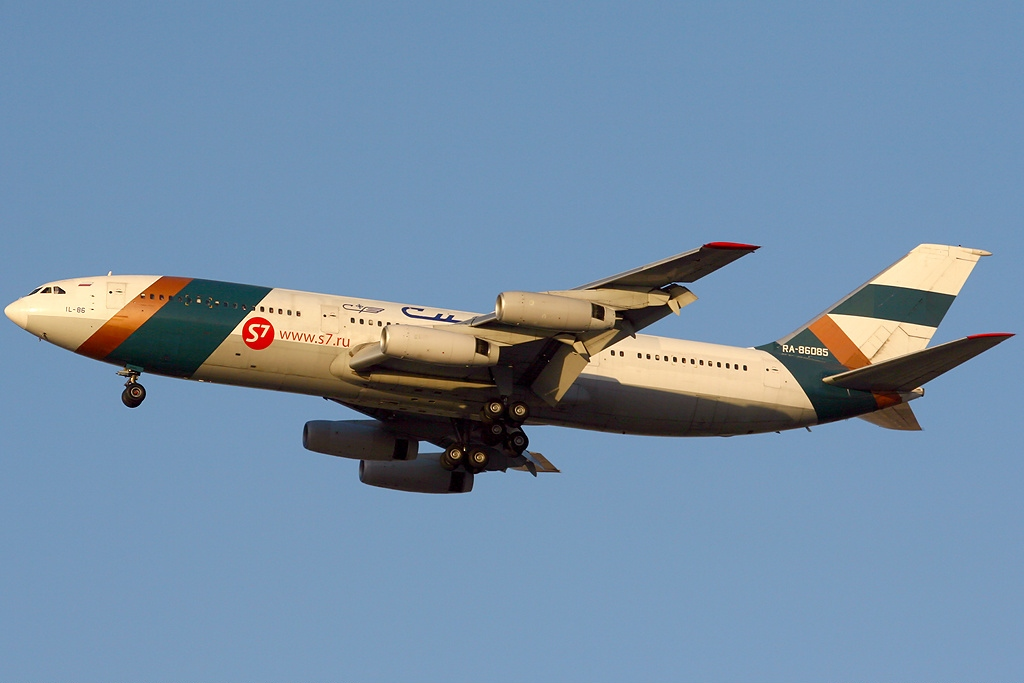
S7 Airlines Ilyushin Il-86 (formerly operated by Vnukovo Airlines)

What is now S7 Airlines started in 1957 as "the Tolmachevo united squadron" of the General Directorate of Civil Aviation of the Soviet Union. After the Soviet Union disintegration and during the 1990s Russian economic reforms, a state-run Siberia Airlines was created based on the squadron in 1992 and later privatized in 1994, the same year Siberia was assigned an IATA airline code.

In 1997, Siberia Airlines tried to buy Vnukovo Airlines, to make Moscow its next main hub, but the purchase did not proceed. After the 1998 Russian financial crisis, Vnukovo Airlines was heading towards bankruptcy, and Siberia Airlines offered to merge the two airlines, but Vnukovo refused. In 1999, Siberia Airlines signed a document offering to take over Vnukovo Airlines, in the event Vnukovo ceased operations due to insolvency.

=== Development 2000–2009 ===
S7 Airlines' previous logo, used from 2005 until 2015

Siberia Airlines began merging with Vnukovo Airlines in 2001. The same year, the airline absorbed Baikal Airlines and then in 2004, the airline absorbed Chelyabinsk Airlines and Enkor.

Siberia Airlines acquired its first non-Russian aircraft, Airbus A310, in 2004. In the summer of 2004, during the Farnborough Airshow, the company signed a memorandum of understanding to purchase fifty Sukhoi Superjet 100s, with the first to be delivered in 2007. However, the airline subsequently dropped its plans to order this aircraft, citing that the aircraft's changed specifications no longer met its requirements.

Siberia Airlines rebranded itself as S7 Airlines in 2005.

In line with an International Air Transport Association (IATA) resolution, from December 2006 the airline began to publish its fares for international destinations originating in Russia in euros, rather than US dollars. This resulted in a fare increase, as the conversion rate used was 1 euro = 1 US dollar. Fuel surcharges were also published in euros. Its domestic fares were still to be shown in the local currency. Also in December 2006, the airline became the second Russian air carrier to complete, and pass, the IATA Operational Safety Audit, which is the first global air safety standard.

In April 2007, S7 announced that it had set up a new division, called Globus, focused on charter flights for tourists to foreign holiday destinations. Initially, the aircraft for this division were drawn from the mainline fleet, but during 2010–2014, ten Boeing 737-800 aircraft were leased with an all-economy layout, with the option for a further ten aircraft.

=== Development 2010–COVID ===
S7 joined Oneworld airline alliance in 2010.

In November 2015, S7 Airlines offered to acquire a majority stake in the bankrupt Transaero; the proposal was subsequently rejected by shareholders.

In 2016, the American band OK Go partnered with S7 to film a "zero-g" music video for their song "Upside Down & Inside Out", aboard a reduced gravity aircraft.

On 28 August 2018, S7 would invest $192.87 million in a new manufacturing plant in Moscow, part of its Victory business plan. In December 2018, a few months after the completion of its purchase of Sea Launch the parent holding company was renamed S7 AirSpace Corporation to reflect the transition from an aviation-only business.

On 31 March 2019, chairwoman and co-owner Natalia Fileva died after the Epic LT private plane she was in crashed while landing at Frankfurt Egelsbach Airport. In August 2019, S7 Airlines announced it was collecting donations for Siberian forests damaged by massive fires. The airline decided to use a hybrid-retro livery on one of its Airbus A320-200 to the hybrid-retro livery, underlining its previous name and current callsign: Siberia Airlines. The livery is a combination of one from 1992 to 2005 and one from 2017–today. Also in August 2019, the airline announced that S7 Airlines and Globus Airlines would merge by December 2019, ending Globus' operations. By early December 2019, the merger had been completed.

=== Development 2022–present ===
In February 2022, as a result of the Russian invasion of Ukraine, S7 and other Russian airlines were banned from EU airspace and that of other countries. This led to S7 suspending operations in Europe on 25 February 2022 and a suspension of all international flights by 5 March 2022. The owner of aircraft leased to S7 Airlines, AerCap, is seeking to repossess their aircraft. In April 2022, S7 was suspended from Oneworld. In July 2022, S7 announced a halt to all plans for its new low-cost subsidiary Citrus due to the required aircraft not being delivered. The US Commerce Department, who had previously sanctioned US manufactured aircraft, extended sanctions to the European manufactured Airbus aircraft in S7's fleet in August 2022.

In September 2022, S7 reached an agreement to hand back its two leased Boeing 737 MAX aircraft to their lessor. The aircraft VQ-BGV and VQ-BGW, were transferred via Turkey, a neutral country. Air Lease Corporation are seeking to recover six Airbus A320s, two Airbus A321ceo, and five A321neo, as the lease payments are not being made.

October 2023 saw problems for S7, with spare parts for engines and the servicing of aircraft, as a result of sanctions, have reduced the number of Airbus aircraft that are operational to around 13, or 20%, of the Airbus fleet.

In December 2023, an agreement was reached with AerCap, ALC, SMBC Aviation Capital and others to purchase 45 aircraft for around 45-50 billion rubles, with help from the Russian National Wealth Fund.

In July 2024, Dmitry Yadrov, the head of Russia's civil aviation regulator confirmed reports from S7 that they were "decommissioning" their A320neo and A321neo aircraft due to ongoing issues with the Pratt & Whitney PW1000G engines and international sanctions preventing regular maintenance of the engines.

== Financial and operational performance ==
There are financial and operational performance S7 Airlines starting from 2011:

	2011	2012	2013	2014	2015	2016	2017	2018	2019	2020	2021
Passengers flown (millions)	5.128	6.351	7.085	7.938	8.207	9.509	9.948	11.552	13.059	12.349	17.831
— Domestic flights (millions)	3.548	4.010	4.385	5.093	5.526	6.673	6.881	7.146	8.173	11.303	
— International flights (millions)	1.580	2.341	2.700	2.845	2.681	2.836	3.067	4.406	4.886	1.046	
Load factor, %	75.6	80.1	80.9	80.0	80.3	85.2	85.3				
Turnover (rubles, billion)	45,264	55,864	62,721	70,706	82,215	108,111	117,722				
Net Profit (rubles, million)	734	546	702	868	923	2,896	4,432				
Number of employees	—	2,507	2,711	2,672	2,752	2,571	2,878				
Number of aircraft (at the end of the year)	—	38	43	45	45	46	62				
Source											

== Destinations ==
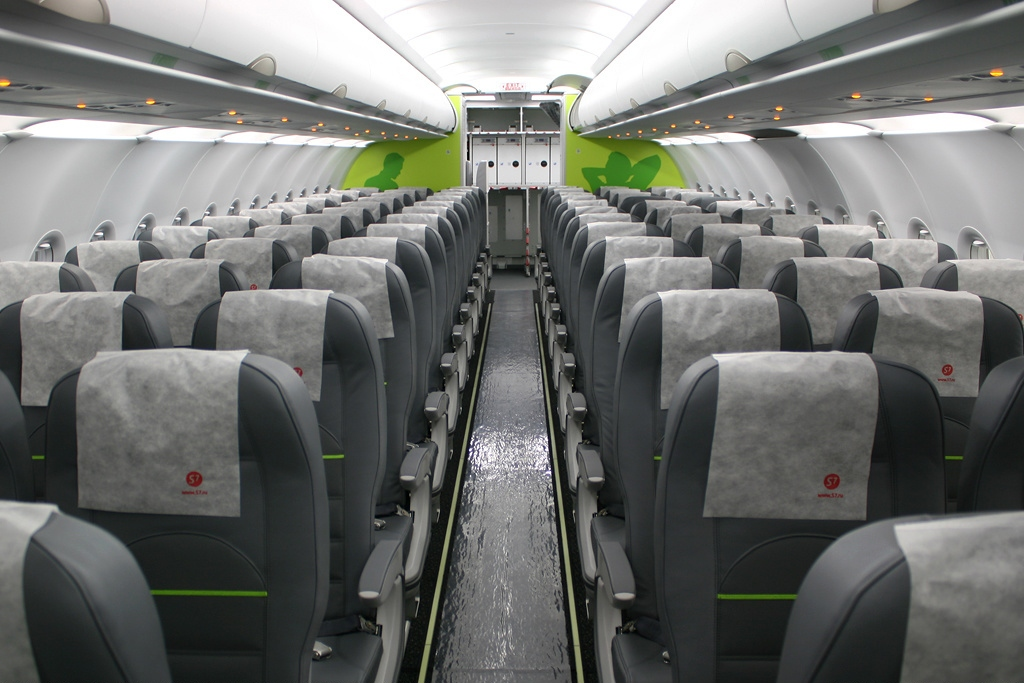
The cabin of a brand new S7 Airlines Airbus A320-200

As of November 2023, the airline serves 10 countries with 134 routes.

=== Codeshare agreements ===
S7 Airlines has codeshare agreement with the following airlines:

- Azerbaijan Airlines
- Azimuth
- Uzbekistan Airways

=== Interline agreements ===
S7 Airlines has interline agreement with the following airlines:

- Azerbaijan Airlines
- Azimuth
- Bangkok Airways
- Emirates
- Myanmar Airways International
- Uzbekistan Airways

== Fleet ==
=== Current fleet ===
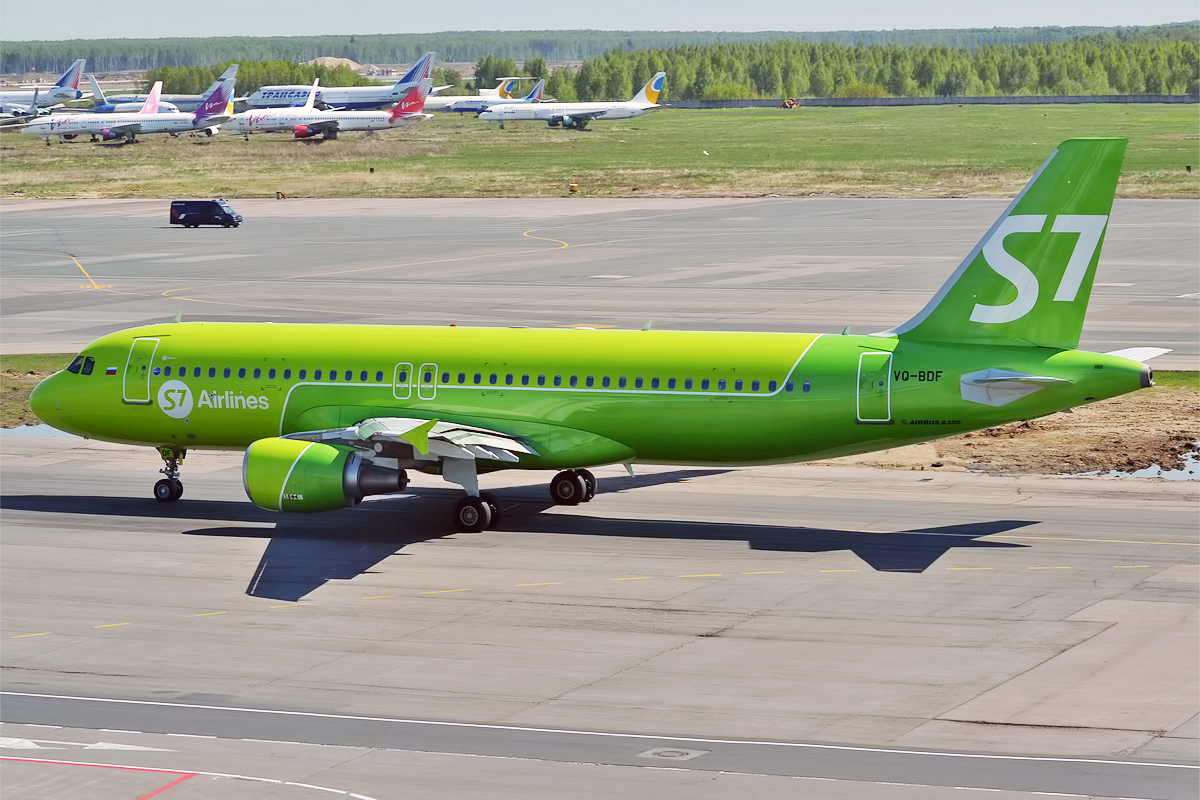
S7 Airlines Airbus A320 painted in the airline's revised livery

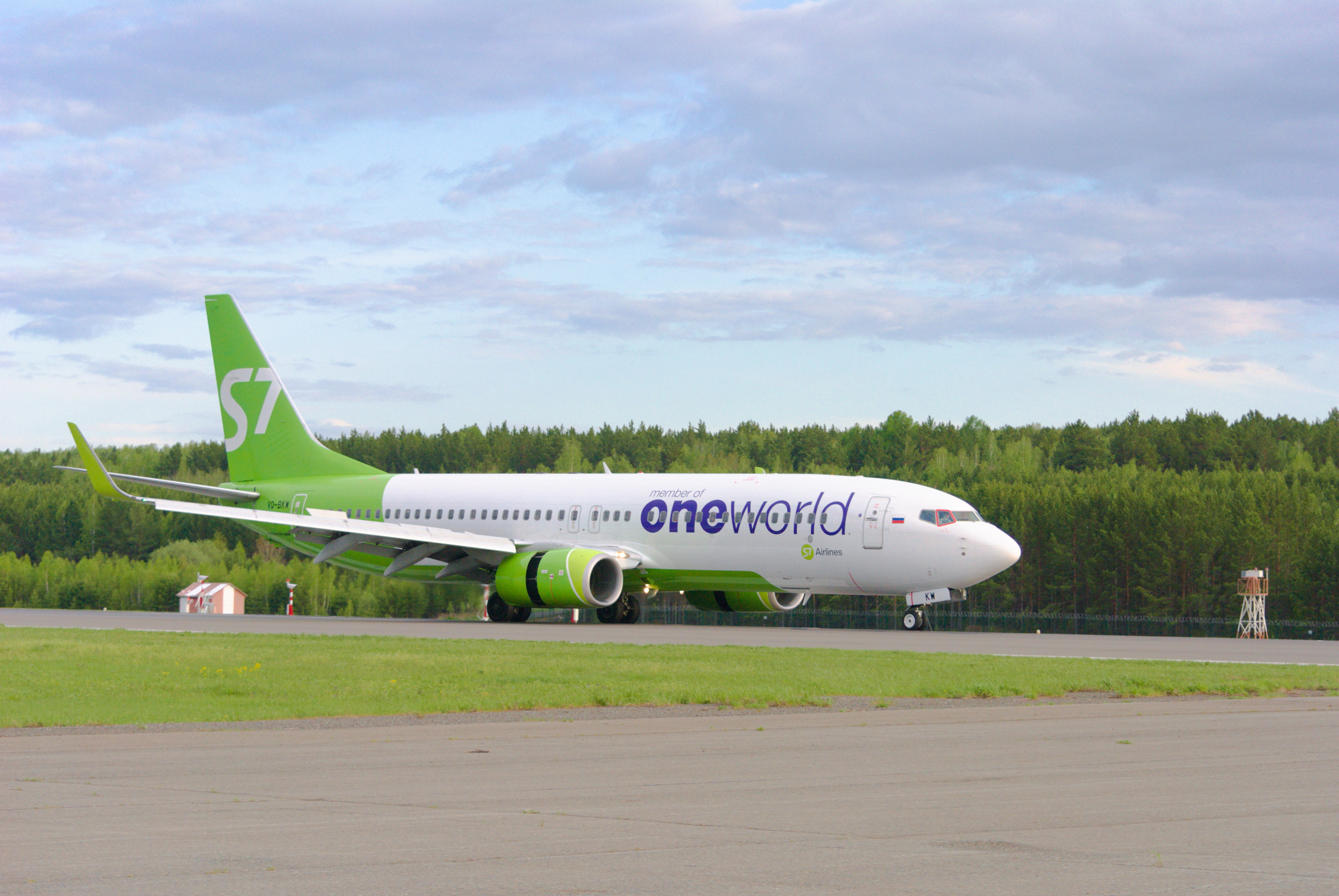
Globus Airlines-operated S7 Airlines Boeing 737-800 painted in the Oneworld livery

As of August 2025, S7 Airlines operates the following aircraft:

S7 Airlines fleet
Aircraft	In service	Orders	Passengers			Notes
Aircraft	In service	Orders	J	Y	Total	Notes
Airbus A319-100	2	—	—	144	144	Both aircraft parked.
Airbus A320-200	16	—	—	174	174	One painted in a hybrid-retro livery.
Airbus A320neo	31	—	8	156	164	21 aircraft parked. To be retired.
Airbus A321-200	11	—	8	189	197	
Airbus A321-200	11	—	8	190	198	
Airbus A321neo	8	—	8	195	203	All aircraft parked.
Airbus A321neo	8	—	8	203	211	All aircraft parked.
Boeing 737-800	17	—	8	168	176	
Embraer E170	17	—	—	78	78	4 aircraft parked.
Tupolev Tu-214	—	100	TBA			Agreement for order.
S7 Airlines Cargo fleet
Boeing 737-800BCF	2	—	Cargo			
Total	104	100				

=== Fleet development ===
On 29 May 2007, the airline announced a proposed order for fifteen Boeing 787 Dreamliners scheduled for delivery in 2014, with an option for ten additional aircraft. However, the order was officially cancelled on 29 January 2009, with S7 stating that it was considering the possibility of taking the aircraft under a leasing scheme. As of November 2008, all Soviet-made aircraft had left the fleet.

In April 2018, S7 renewed interest in the Sukhoi Superjet by planning to purchase 25 Sukhoi Superjet 75 aircraft, with an option of 50 more for the new modification of the Superjet family, and become the launch customer. These will replace the airline's aging Embraer E170 aircraft. The airline plans to take deliveries of this aircraft from 2023. However, in September 2019, it was announced the project had been scrapped.

In October 2018, the airline took delivery of its first Boeing 737 MAX 8 and became the Russian launch customer of the aircraft type. In September 2022, the aircraft were returned to their lessor.

== Incidents and accidents ==
- On 4 October 2001, Siberia Airlines Flight 1812, a Tupolev Tu-154M, registration RA-85693, en route from Tel Aviv to Novosibirsk crashed into the Black Sea off Sochi, after being hit with a S-200V surface-to-air missile launched as part of a Ukrainian Air Defense exercise staged off Cape Opuk (or Chuluk) in Crimea. All 78 people on board were killed.
- On 24 August 2004, Siberia Airlines Flight 1047, a Tupolev Tu-154B2, registration RA-85556, en route from Moscow to Sochi exploded and crashed due to a terrorist bombing near Rostov-on-Don, Russia, killing all 46 people on board.
- On 9 July 2006, S7 Airlines Flight 778, an Airbus A310 carrying 193 passengers and 10 crew members, suffered a landing accident at Irkutsk International Airport in Siberia. The jet failed to decelerate on landing, overran the runway, and crashed into a concrete barricade; 125 people died.
- On 20 August 2020, Russian politician Alexei Navalny was flying to Moscow on S7 Airlines. He was poisoned and became ill. When the plane landed in Omsk he was transferred to an ambulance. He was later treated in Germany.
- On 2 December 2021, S7 Airlines Flight 5220, an Airbus A321-271N made an emergency landing at Irkutsk International Airport due to severe icing which led to reduced controllability. The flight suffered from rapid pitch oscillations for 7 minutes. After control was regained the flight diverted to Irkutsk, where all 209 people on board exited injury-free.

== Subsidiaries ==
S7 Technics is a subsidiary of S7, located on the grounds of Tolmachevo Airport.

== See also ==
- Babyflot
- List of airlines of Russia
- Transport in Russia
