= Globus Airlines =

2007–2019 Russian airline operating for S7 Airlines

IATA	ICAO	Call sign
GH	GLP	GLOBUS
- Founded: April 2007
- Ceased operations: December 2019
- Operating bases: Moscow Domodedovo Airport
- Secondary hubs: Tolmachevo Airport
- Frequent-flyer program: S7 Priority
- Alliance: Oneworld (affiliate; 2010—2019)
- Fleet size: 23
- Destinations: 34
- Parent company: S7 Airlines
- Headquarters: Moscow, Russia

Globus Airlines (Russian: Авиакомпания «Глобус», romanized: Aviakompanija «Globus») was a Russian airline based at Moscow Domodedovo Airport operating for and as a subsidiary of S7 Airlines.

== History ==
The airline was founded in the spring of 2008 by S7 Airlines, a major Russian airline, based in Novosibirsk for charter flights. Globus started operations shortly thereafter with a Tupolev Tu-154M, which was previously in use at the parent company. Another Tupolev Tu-154M and the first Boeing 737-400 were transferred from S7 Airlines to Globus later in the first year of operation, followed by second-hand Boeing 737-800 aircraft. Its purpose was to concentrate on flying to holiday destinations. From 2010 onwards, Globus had been operating mainly regular domestic services, however it was still in cooperation with its former owner, S7 Airlines.

In August 2019, the airline's head announced that S7 Airlines and Globus Airlines would merge by December 2019, therefore closing the operations of the second airline. By early December 2019, the merger had been completed.

== Destinations ==
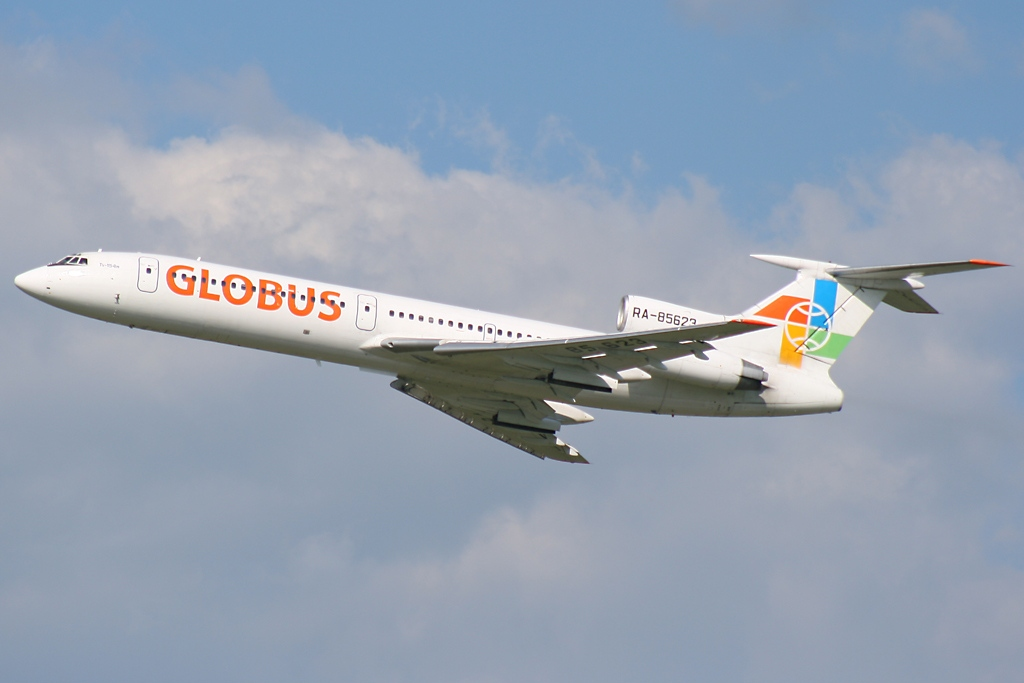
A Tupolev Tu-154M formerly operated by Globus

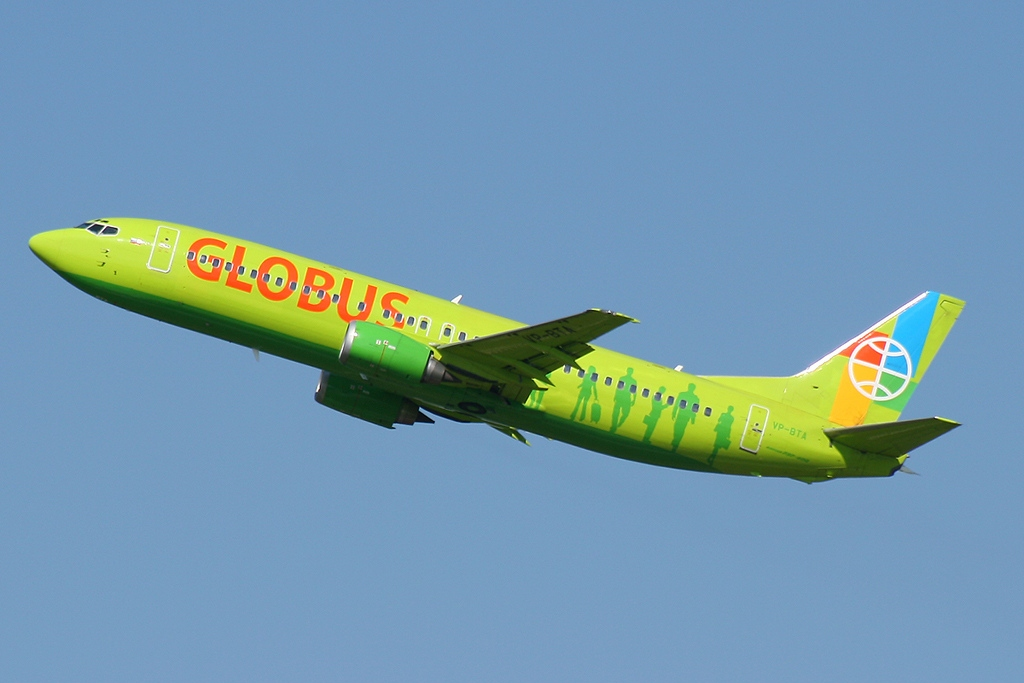
A Boeing 737-400 formerly operated by Globus

Globus Airlines operated scheduled and charter flights to domestic and some international destinations on behalf of S7 Airlines.

=== Asia ===
Armenia

- Yerevan – Zvartnots International Airport seasonal

China

- Beijing – Beijing Capital International Airport
- Hong Kong – Hong Kong International Airport seasonal
- Shanghai – Shanghai Pudong International Airport seasonal

Cyprus

- Larnaca – Larnaca International Airport
- Paphos – Paphos International Airport

Kyrgyzstan

- Osh – Osh Airport

Tajikistan

- Khujand – Khujand Airport seasonal

=== Europe ===
Croatia

- Pula – Pula Airport seasonal

Iceland

- Reykjavík – Keflavík International Airport seasonal

Italy

- Genoa – Genoa Cristoforo Colombo Airport seasonal
- Verona – Verona Villafranca Airport

Montenegro

- Tivat – Tivat Airport

Russia

- Anapa – Anapa Airport seasonal
- Barnaul – Barnaul Airport
- Bratsk – Bratsk Airport
- Chita – Kadala Airport
- Gorno-Altaysk – Gorno-Altaysk Airport
- Irkutsk – International Airport Irkutsk focus city
- Kaliningrad – Khrabrovo Airport seasonal
- Kemerovo – Kemerovo International Airport
- Krasnodar – Krasnodar International Airport
- Krasnoyarsk – Krasnooyarsk International Airport
- Mineralnye Vody – Mineralnye Vody Airport
- Moscow – Moscow Domodedovo Airport base
- Nizhnevartovsk – Nizhnevartovsk Airport
- Norilsk – Alykel Airport
- Novosibirsk – Tolmachevo Airport base
- Novy Urengoy – Novy Urengoy Airport
- Sochi – Sochi International Airport
- St Petersburg – Pulkovo Airport
- Ulan-Ude – Baikal International Airport
- Vladikavkaz – Beslan Airport

Spain

- Barcelona – Barcelona–El Prat Josep Tarradellas Airport

== Fleet ==
=== Historic fleet ===
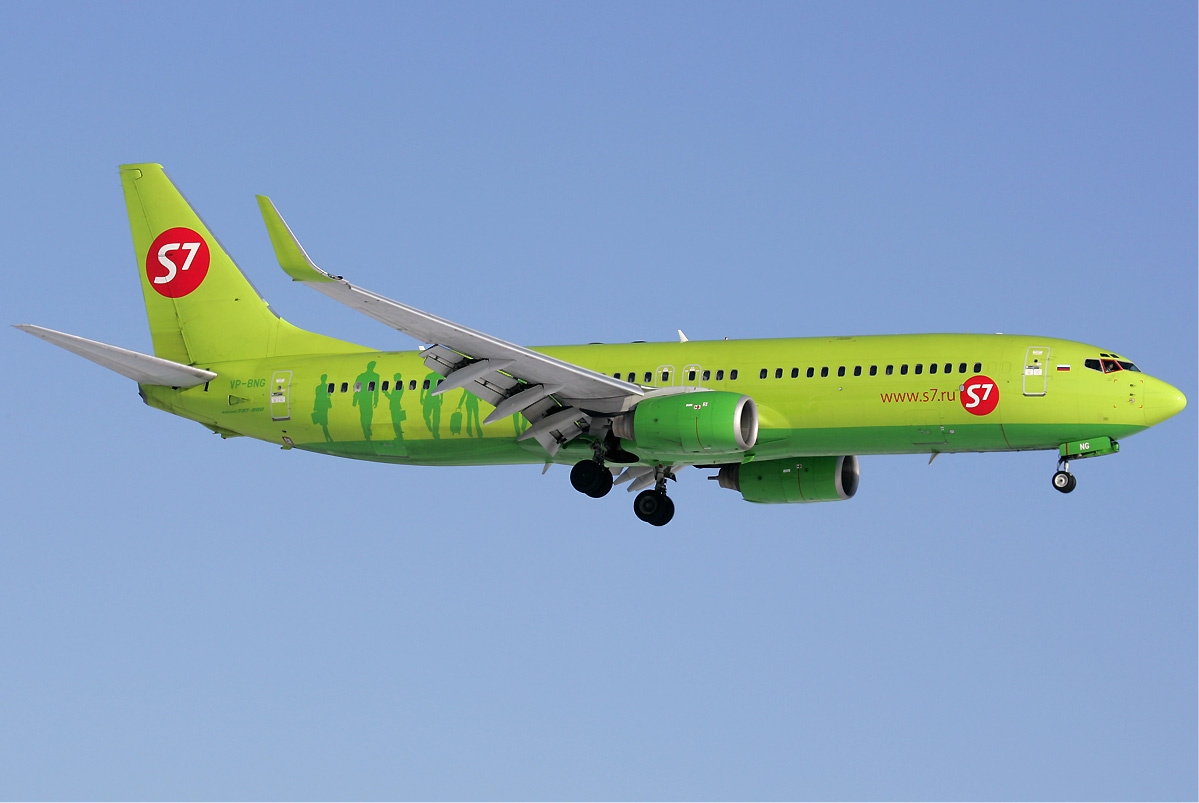
A S7 Airlines Boeing 737-800 operated by Globus Airlines

As of October 2019, prior to the merger into S7 Airlines, the Globus Airlines fleet comprised the following aircraft:

Aircraft	In Fleet	Orders	Passengers			Notes
Aircraft	In Fleet	Orders	J	Y	Total	Notes
Boeing 737-800	21	—	8	168	176	One in Oneworld livery.
Boeing 737 MAX 8	2	8	6	168	176	Deliveries from 2018. Russian launch customer. Not taken up due to merger with S7 Airlines and Russia's invasion of Ukraine.
Total	23	8				

=== Retired fleet ===
Retired fleet
Aircraft	Notes
Boeing 737-400	
Tupolev Tu-154M	First aircraft type operated.
