= Transport in Kazakhstan =

The vast territory of Kazakhstan spans across 2,700,000 km^{2} (1,000,000 sq mi). The population density is low in Kazakhstan, and the centers of industry and agriculture are spread out and remote from world markets.

== Railways ==
Railways provide 68% of all cargo and passenger traffic to over 57% of the country. There are 16,636 km (10,337 mi) in common carrier service, excluding industrial lines, of which 4,237 km (2,633 mi) was electrified as of 2021. All railway lines in Kazakhstan are built in 1,520 mm (4 ft 11 27/32 in) gauge.

Kazakhstan Temir Zholy (KTZ) is the national railway company. KTZ cooperates with French rolling stock manufacturer Alstom in developing Kazakhstan's railway infrastructure. Alstom has more than 600 staff and two joint ventures with KTZ and its subsidiary in Kazakhstan. In July 2017, Alstom opened its first locomotive repairing center in Kazakhstan. It is the only repairing center in Central Asia and the Caucasus.

As the Kazakhstani rail system was designed during the Soviet era, rail routes were designed ignoring inter-Soviet borders, based on the needs of Soviet planning. This has caused anomalies, such as the route from Oral to Aktobe passing briefly through Russian territory. It also means that routes might not suit modern-day Kazakhstani needs.

Kazakhstan's developed railway system promotes international and regional trade connecting Asia and Europe. In 2019, the transit of goods through Kazakhstan increased 23% to 664,000 containers.

=== Railway links with adjacent countries ===
- Russia - same gauge (former Soviet Union railway system)
- China - break of gauge 1,520 mm (4 ft 11 27/32 in)/1,435 mm (4 ft 8 1/2 in);
  - Border station at Druzhba, KZ - Alashankou, CN, connection between the Turkestan–Siberia Railway and the Northern Xinjiang Railway (no electrification on them).
  - Another connection exist from Altynkol railway station near Khorgas to the Jinghe–Yining–Khorgos Railway towards Ürümqi.
- Kyrgyzstan - same gauge (former Soviet Union railway system)
- Uzbekistan - same gauge (former Soviet Union railway system)
- Turkmenistan - same gauge (former Soviet Union railway system) (railway link opened in 2013, presently for freight)
- Caspian Sea - railhead 1,520 mm

The strategy of transport development in Kazakhstan until 2015 was to build 1,600 km (990 mi) of new electrified and 2,700 km (1,700 mi) of existing railway stations.

In 2006, a standard gauge rail link from China to Europe was proposed.

In 2007, it was proposed to eliminate break of gauge at Druzhba-Alashankou by converting the Kazakhstan main line to European gauge.

In 2008, BOOT line from Zhetigen to Khorgos on the China border. The line would branch off the existing railway near Shaquanzi.

=== Maps ===
- UN Map
- reliefweb map

== Rapid transit and tram systems ==
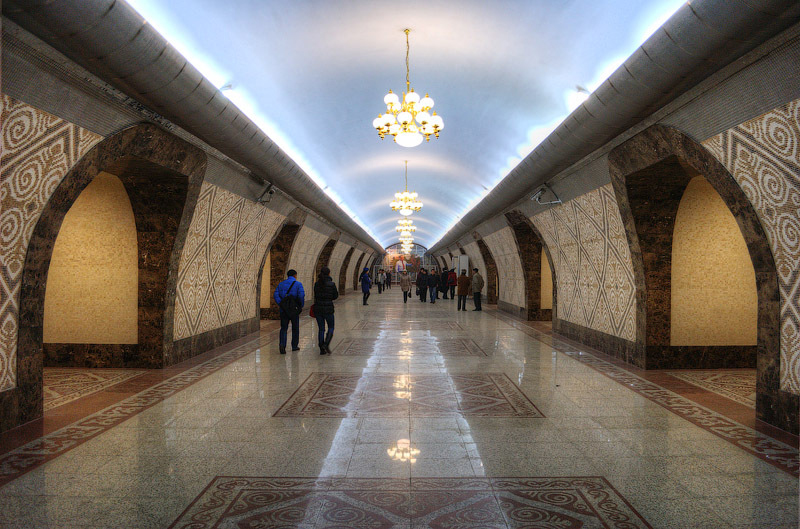
Metro station in Almaty.

=== Almaty ===
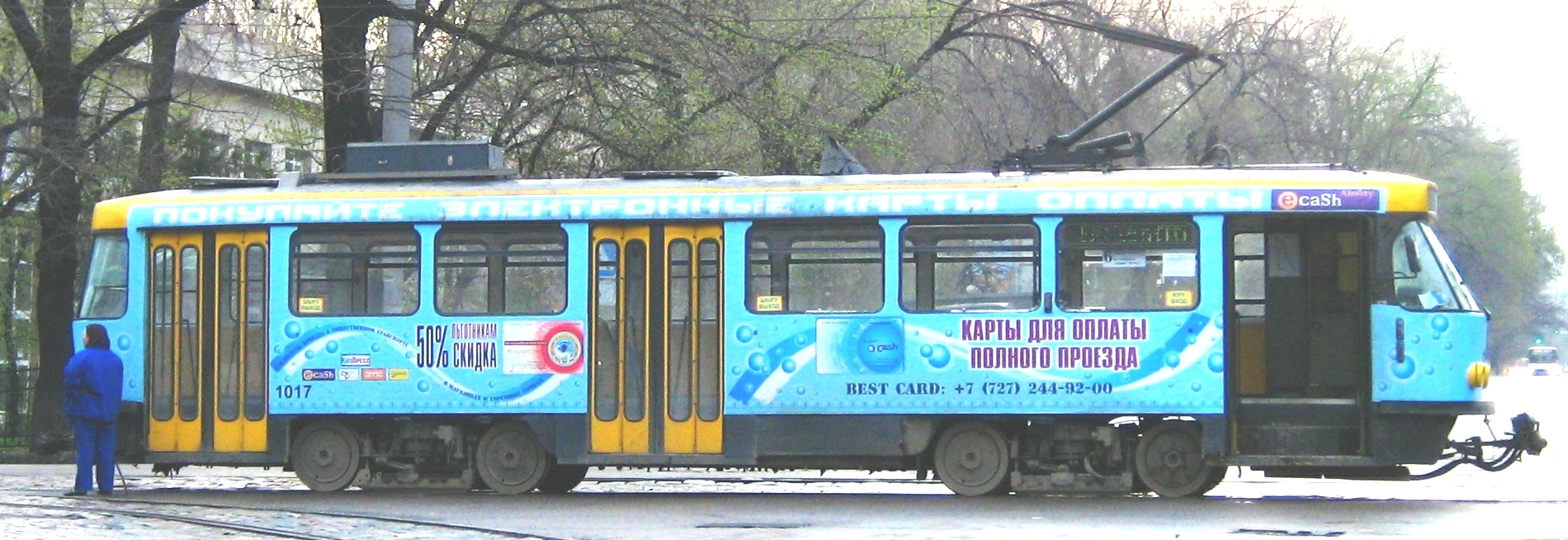
Tram in Almaty

There is a small (8.56 km (5.32 mi)) metro system in Almaty, the former capital and the largest city in the country. Second and third metro lines are planned in the future. The second line would intersect with the first line at Alatau and Zhibek Zholy stations.

In May 2011, the construction of the second phase of the Almaty Metro line 1 began. The general contractor is Almatymetrokurylys. The extension includes five new stations, and will connect the downtown area of Almaty with Kalkaman in the suburbs. Its length will be 8.62 km (5.36 mi).

The construction is divided into three phases. The first phase, the addition of the two stations Sairan and Moscow with a length of 2.7 km (1.7 mi) opened in 2015.

There was a tram system of 10 lines which operated from 1937 to 2015.

=== Astana ===
A metro system is currently under construction in Astana , the capital city.

The metro line had been a long time coming and the project was abandoned at one point in 2013, but an agreement was signed on 7 May 2015 for the project to go ahead.

=== Oskemen ===
In Oskemen, there is a tram system with 3 operating lines. It was temporarily closed in 2018, but has since been reopened. Opened between 1959 and 1978, the tram is a popular form of transport in Oskemen. At its peak, it had six routes, but in 2018 it had four routes in operation. It had a fleet of 50 working tram cars.

=== Pavlodar ===
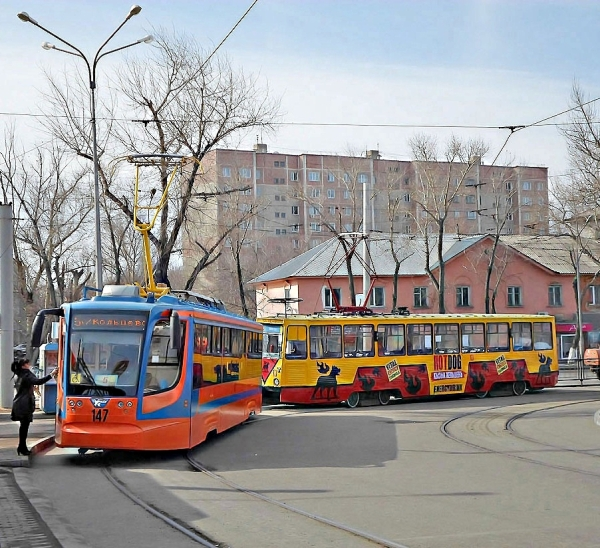
Trams in Pavlodar

In Pavlodar, there is an 86 km (53 mi) tram network which began service in 1965. As of 2012, the network has 20 regular and three special routes. The network has a 60% share of the local public transport market. Its fleet of 115 trams are due to be replaced and in 2012, with the city announcing plans to purchase 100 new trams.

=== Temirtau ===
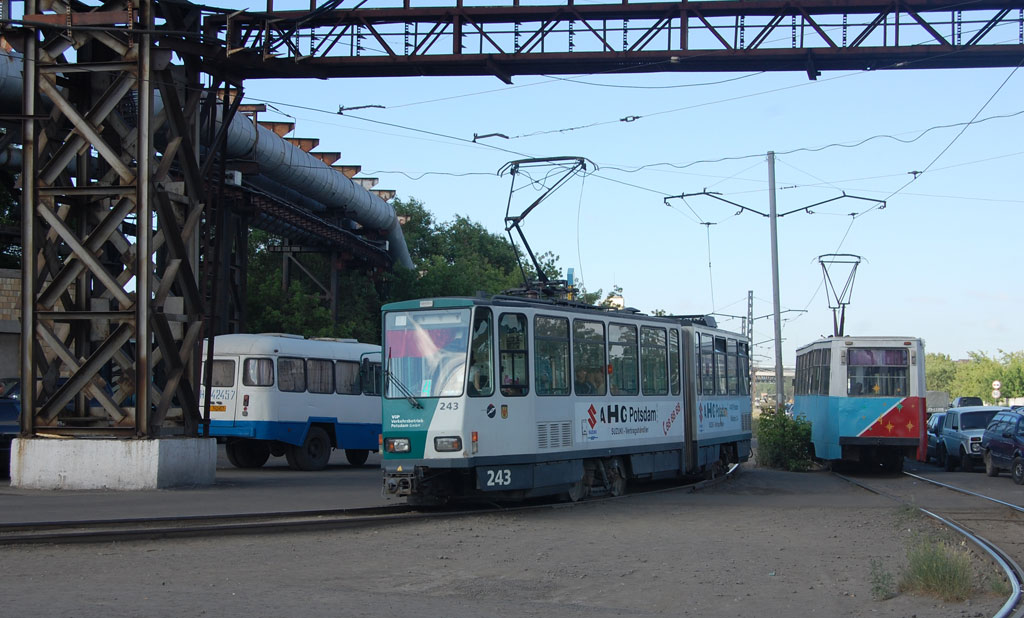
Trams in Temirtau

There are two tram lines in Temirtau.

== Highways ==
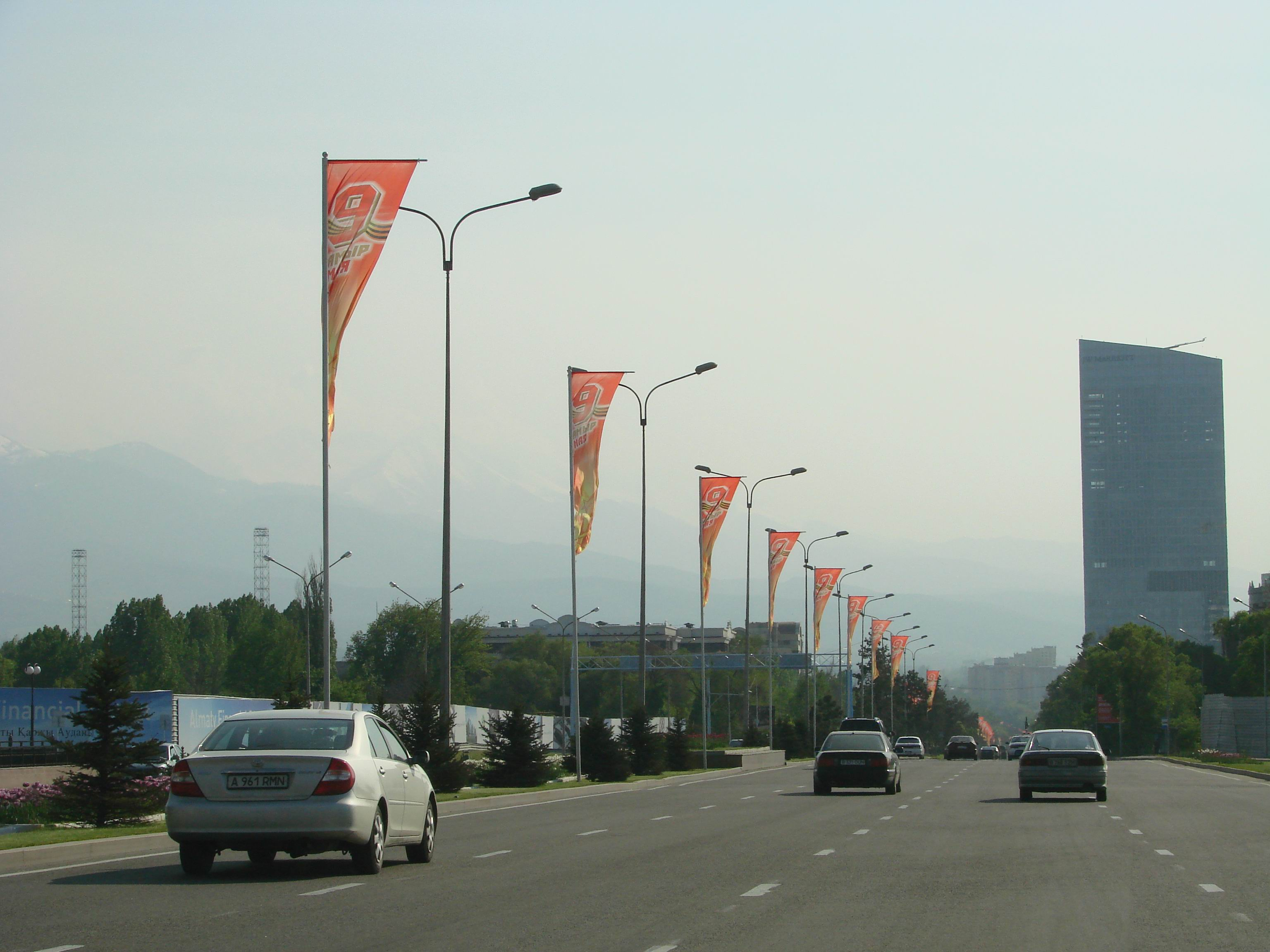
Al-Farabi street, Almaty, Esentai Tower

Kazakhstan has a road network stretching over 96,000 km (60,000 mi), most of which is in need of modernization and repair. It is, however, notable for containing the easterly terminus of European route E40, which contains the most easterly section of the Euroroute network.

- Total: 189,000 kilometres (117,000 mi) (2002)
- Paved: 108,100 km (67,200 mi) (2002)
- Unpaved: 80,900 km (50,300 mi) (2002)

As per the CIA Factbook, as of 2021, Kazakhstan had a total road network of 96,167 km (59,755 mi) which was made up of 83,813 km (52,079 mi) paved and 12,354 km (7,676 mi) unpaved roads.

As of 2017, there were 3,845,301 registered cars and a total of 4,425,770 units of autotransport.

=== Motorways ===
The motorway network in Kazakhstan is rather underdeveloped, mainly due to the low population density in the country, which doesn't require wider roads on long distances. There is a total of 490 km of motorways. The following are the only existing multi-lane, double carriage roads in Kazakhstan:

- A1 - Runs from Astana to Shchuchinsk. It further continues as the A1 two-lane highway to Kokshetau. Motorway length: 250 km (160 mi).
- A2 - Runs from Almaty to a point past Uzynagash. It further continues as the A2 two-lane highway to Shymkent. Motorway length: 58 km (36 mi).
- A2 - Other four-lane portion runs from Shymkent to Zhibek Zholy, on the border with Uzbekistan. Length: 100 km (62 mi).
- A3 - Runs from Almaty to Kapshagay. It further continues as the A3 two-lane highway to Oskemen. Motorway length: 82 km (51 mi).

=== International routes ===
Five international routes pass through Kazakhstan, totaling 23,000 km (14,000 mi). These highways are:

- M-36 Highway: Almaty – Astana – Kostanay (continues to Chelyabinsk)
- Almaty – Petropavl to Omsk with the release of
- M-38 Highway: Almaty - Semey - Pavlodar (continues to Omsk)
- M-39 Highway: Almaty - Shymkent (continues to Tashkent)
- M-32 Highway: Shymkent - Aktobe - Oral (continues to Samara)

In 2009, the country began the construction of the Western Europe-Western China highway, which was completed in 2018, linking the Chinese and Russian highway systems and allowing uninterrupted highway road transport from Europe to China. 2,787 km (1,732 mi) of that highway stretch across Kazakhstan (Aktobe, Kyzylorda, South Kazakhstan, Zhambyl and Almaty oblasts). The thickness of the asphalt and concrete pavement was planned to be 80 cm (31 in), and the expected lifespan of the highway 25 years, without a major overhaul, and the maximum speed limit 120 km/h (75 mph). The project includes a number of bridges over rivers, road maintenance facilities, bus stop areas, avtopavilony, cattle trails, and electronic signage. Simultaneously with the construction of this highway, roads were repaired and built in areas along its route.

== Pipelines ==
As of 2017, pipelines in Kazakhstan consist of:

- Condensate: 658 km (409 mi)
- Gas: 15,256 km (9,480 mi)
- Oil: 8,013 km (4,979 mi)
- Refined products: 1,095 km (680 mi)
- Water: 1,975 km (1,227 mi)

== Waterways and waterborne transportation ==
There are 4,000 km (2,500 mi) of waterways on the Syrdariya (Syr Darya), 80%, and Ertis (Irtysh) rivers, (2010)

== Ports and harbours ==
=== Caspian Sea ===
- Aqtau (Shevchenko) - railhead 1,524 mm (5 ft)
- Atyrau (Gur'yev) - railhead 1,524 mm

=== On rivers ===
- Oskemen (Ust-Kamenogorsk)
- Pavlodar
- Semey (Semipalatinsk)

=== Merchant Marine ===
The merchant marine has a total of 122 vessels as of 2023, consisting of three general cargo vessels, seven petroleum tankers, and 112 other vessels.

== Airports ==
Kazakhstan has a total of 132 airports (2025). However, it is quoted as having a total of 449 airports in 2001.

The large area of the country and the associated long distances makes air travel a very important component in domestic travel.

=== Airports - with paved runways (2012) ===
total: 64

- over 3,047 metres (9,997 ft): 10
- 2,438–3,047 metres (7,999–9,997 ft): 25
- 1,524–2,437 metres (5,000–7,995 ft): 16
- 914–1,523 metres (2,999–4,997 ft): 5
- under 914 metres (2,999 ft): 8

=== Airports - with unpaved runways (2012) ===
total: 33

- over 3,047 metres (9,997 ft): 5
- 2,438–3,047 metres (7,999–9,997 ft): 7
- 1,524–2,437 metres (5,000–7,995 ft): 3
- 914–1,523 metres (2,999–4,997 ft): 5
- under 914 metres (2,999 ft): 13

=== Open Sky regime ===
11 airports of Kazakhstan are part of the open sky regime, which allows more foreign carriers and more flights to operate at Kazakh airports. They include the airports of Astana, Almaty, Shymkent, Aktau, Karaganda, Ust-Kamenogorsk, Pavlodar, Kokshetau, Taraz, Petropavlovsk, and Semey.

=== Heliports ===
Total: 32 (2025)

== Airlines ==
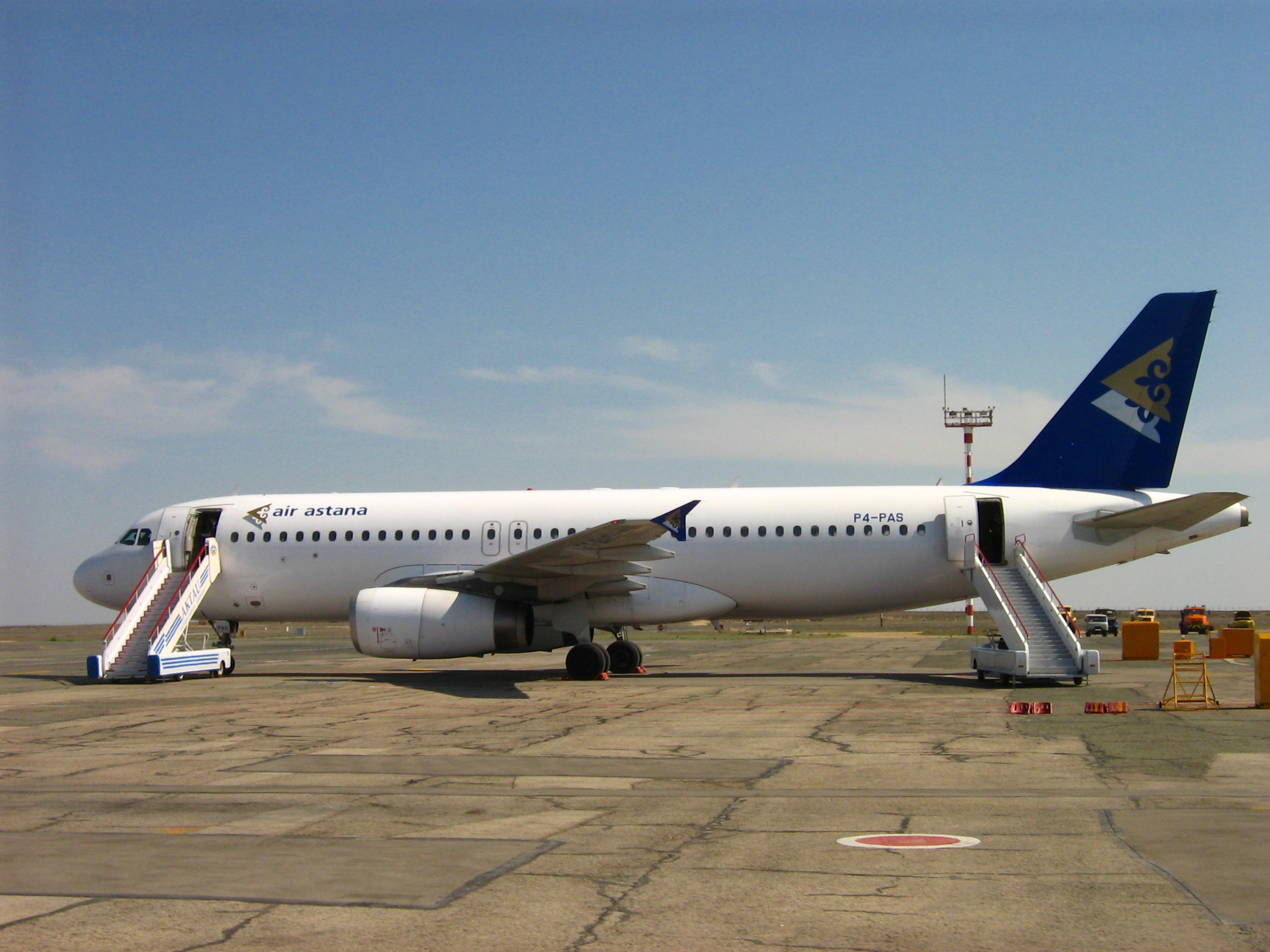
Air Astana Airbus-320 aircraft at Aktau Airport.

The European Commission blacklisted all Kazakh carriers in 2009, with the sole exception of Air Astana. Since then, Kazakhstan had consistently been taking measures to modernize and revamp its air safety oversight. Thus, in 2016, the European Aviation Safety Agency removed all Kazakh airlines from its blacklist citing “sufficient evidence of compliance” with international standards by Kazakh airlines and its Civil Aviation Committee.

In December 2021, it was announced that Kazakhstan’s aviation safety record increased to 84%, which is 15% higher than the global average. These statistics were reported from an audit conducted by the ICAO Coordinated Validation Mission.

- Air Astana - Air Astana (Эйр Астана) is the principal airline and the flag carrier of the Republic of Kazakhstan, based in Almaty, Kazakhstan. It operates scheduled domestic and international services on 56 routes from its main hub, Almaty International Airport, and from its 2 secondary hubs, Astana International Airport and Atyrau Airport. It is a joint venture between Kazakhstan's sovereign wealth fund Samruk-Kazyna (51%), and BAE Systems PLC (49%). It was incorporated in October 2001, and started commercial flights on 15 May 2002. At the 2012 World Airline Awards held at Farnborough Airshow in the UK, Air Astana was named the Best Airline in Central Asia & India.
- FlyArystan - low-cost subsidiary of Air Astana
- SCAT Airlines
- Sunday Airlines - charter subsidiary of SCAT Airlines
- Qazaq Air
- Caspiy
- Kaz TransAir
- Sigma Airlines
- Sunkar Air

== The New Silk Road ==
Kazakhstan is actively involved in the New Silk Road initiative, which is an infrastructure project expected to significantly accelerate and reduce the cost of goods delivery from China to Europe through Central Asia.
