= Shaquanzi =

Town in Xinjiang, China

Coordinates: 44°40′00″N 83°12′00″E

Shaquanzi (Chinese: 沙泉子; pinyin: Shāquánzǐ) is a small town in Xinjiang, China about 100 km from the border with Kazakhstan.

== Transport ==
The town is served by the original railway which connected China with Kazakhstan via Druzhba, Kazakhstan and Alashankou, China in the early 1990s.

In 2008, a BOOT scheme proposes to build a more direct line to Almaty in Kazakhstan which would branch off the existing line in the vicinity of this town.
