= Western Europe-Western China Highway =

Highways connecting Russia, Kazakhstan and China

The Western Europe – Western China Highway (WE-WC Highway) is a series of highways that since 2018 connect St. Petersburg in Russia, Almaty in Kazakhstan and Lianyungang in China, and allow uninterrupted highway road travel and road transport between Europe and China.

The highway system has a length of 8,445 km, and links the cities of St. Petersburg, Moscow, Nizhny Novgorod, Kazan, Orenburg (Russia), Aktobe, Kyzylorda, Shymkent, Taraz, Corday, Almaty (Kazakhstan), Khorgos, Urumqi, Lanzhou, Zhengzhou and Lianyungang (China). It provides a land-based alternative to the traditionally predominant mode of sea transport of goods from China to Russia and Europe, cutting transport time to Europe from around 45 days by ship through the Suez Canal to around 11 days by way of the WE-WC highway.

After ten years of construction, the last parts of the WE-WC highway became operational on 27 September 2018 with the opening of the border crossing between Kazakstan and China in Khorgos. The first TIR test truck completed the 13-day journey from Xinjang to Poland in November 2018. The WE-WC highway required significant road construction in Kazakhstan, supported by the World Bank, which estimated that the new highways connected 5.5 million people and significantly increased trade in the region.
