= Transport in China =

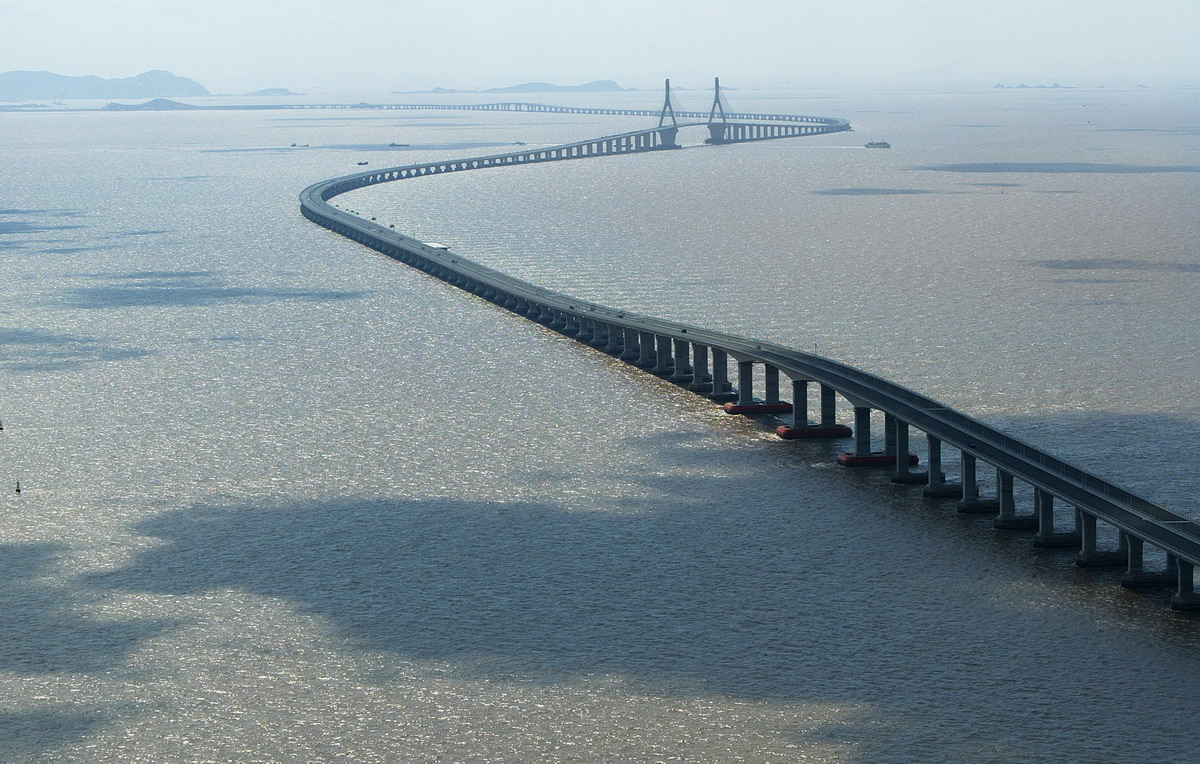
The Donghai Bridge is one of the longest bridges in the world.

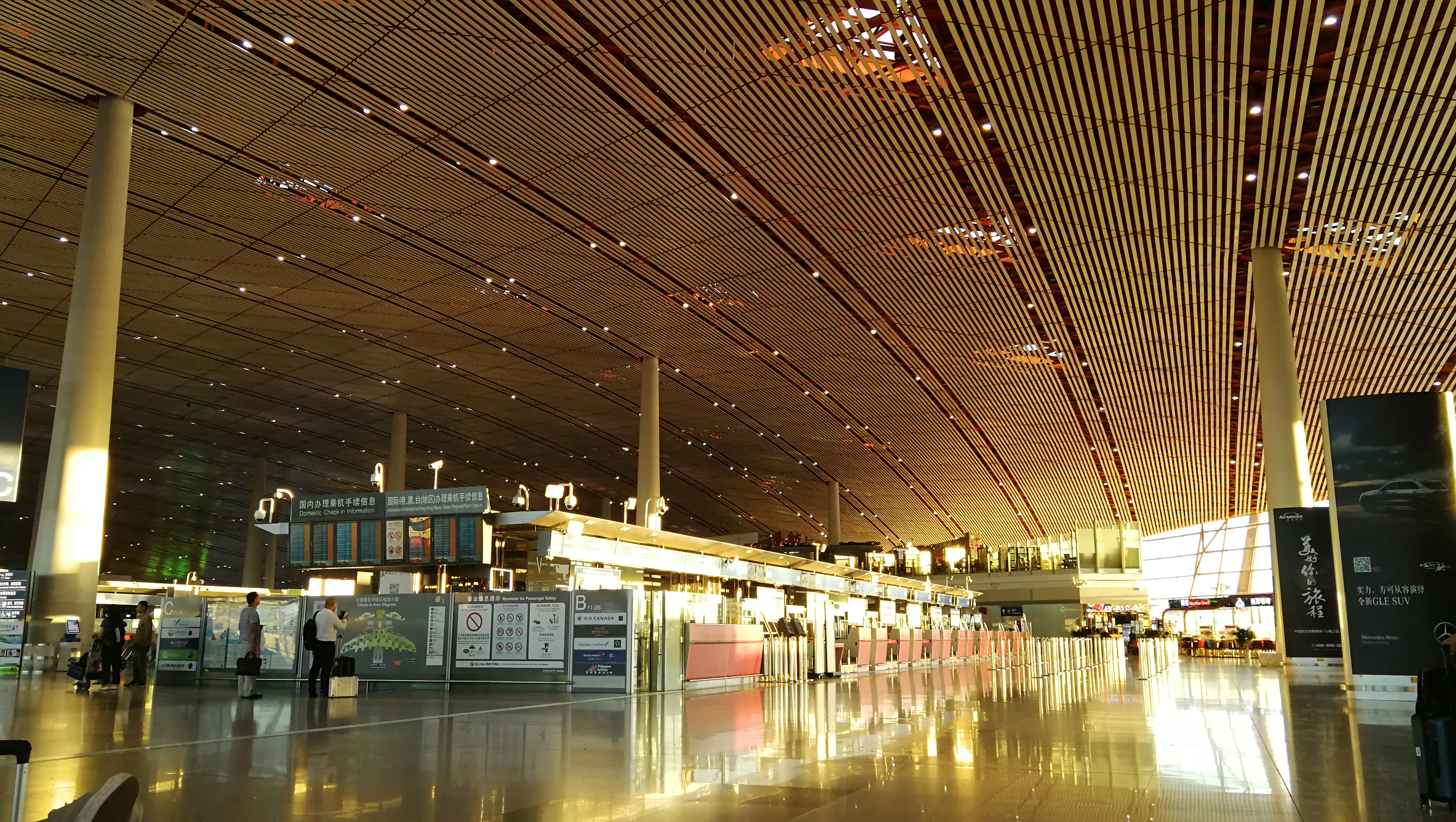
Beijing Capital International Airport, one of the busiest airports in Asia.

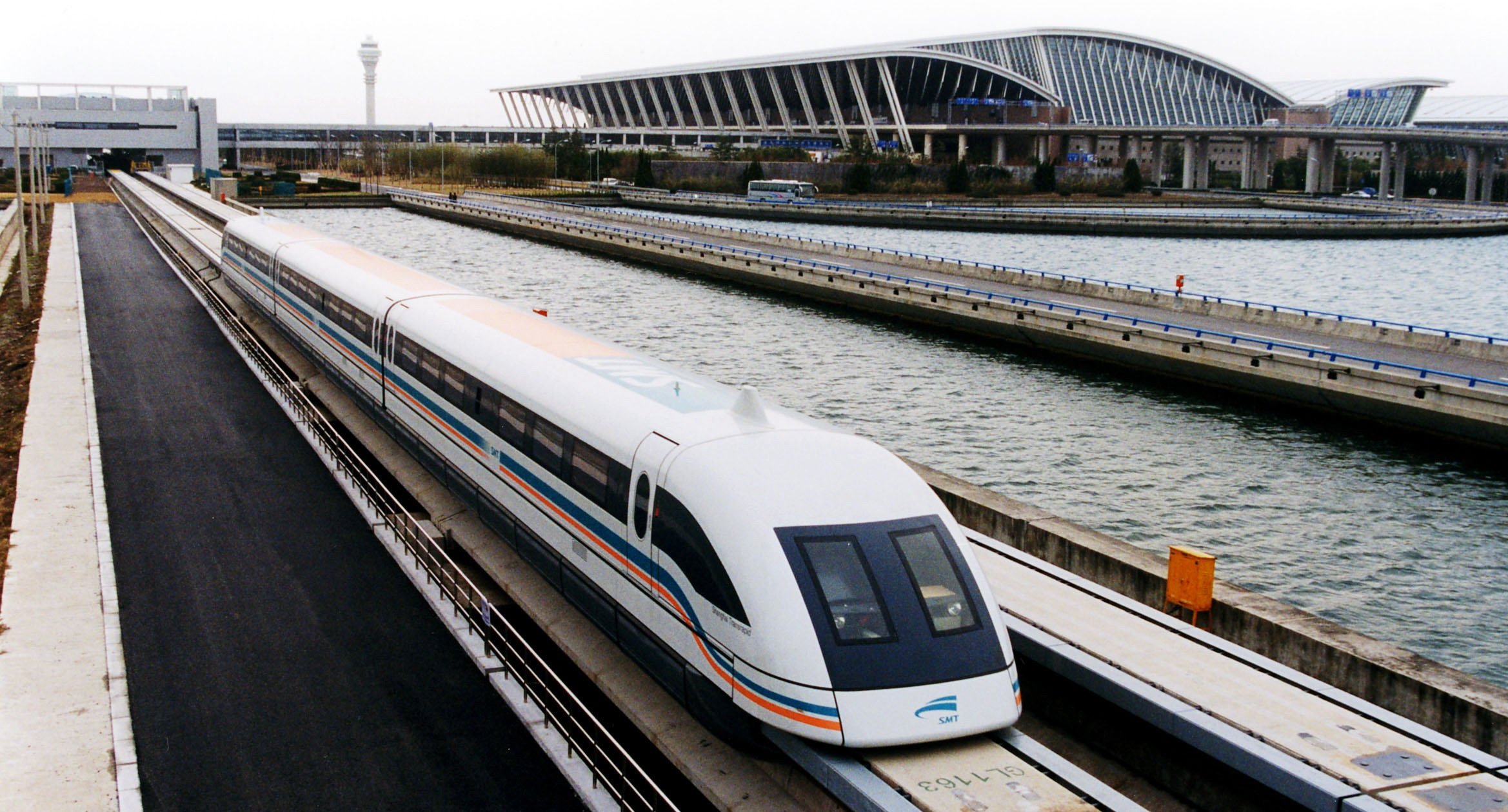
The Transrapid Shanghai maglev train, with a top speed of 431 km/h (268 mph). It is the first and only commercial high-speed maglev line in the world.

Transport in China has experienced major growth and expansion in recent years. Although China's transport system comprises a vast network of transport nodes across its huge territory, the nodes tend to concentrate in the more economically developed coastal areas and inland cities along major rivers. The physical state and comprehensiveness of China's transport infrastructure tend to vary widely by geography. While remote, rural areas still largely depend on non-mechanized means of transport, urban areas boast a wide variety of modern options, including a maglev system connecting the city center of Shanghai with Shanghai Pudong International Airport. Airports, roads, and railway construction will provide a massive employment boost in China over the next decade.

Much of contemporary China's transport systems have been built since the establishment of the People's Republic in 1949. The railway, which is the primary mode of long distance transport, has seen rapid growth reaching 139,000 km (86,371 mi) of railway lines making it the second longest network in the world (2016). Prior to 1950, there were only 21,800 km (13,546 mi) of railway lines. The extensive rail network includes the longest and busiest HSR network in the world with 35,000 km (21,748 mi) of high-speed lines by year end 2019. While rail travel remained the most popular form of intercity transport, air travel has also experienced significant growth since the late 1990s. Major airports such as Beijing Capital International and Shanghai Pudong International being among the busiest in the world. At the end of 2017, there are some 34 metro systems in operation across China, including some of the largest and busiest subway networks in the world. Of the 12 largest metro networks in the world by length, seven are now in China. Additionally, many bus rapid transit, light rail and rapid transit lines are currently under construction, or in the planning stages across the country. The highway and road system also has gone through rapid expansion, resulting in a rapid increase of motor vehicle use throughout China. A government-led effort started in the 90s to connect the country by expressways via the National Trunk Highway System has expanded the network to about 97,000 km (60,273 mi) by the end of 2012 making China's the longest expressway network in the world.

== History ==
China is in the midst of a massive upgrade of its transport infrastructure. Until recently, China's economy was able to continue to grow despite deficiencies in infrastructure development. This is no longer the case, and the government realizes that to keep the economy moving forward, they need an efficient system in place to move goods and people across the country. According to World Bank statistics, goods lost due to poor or obsolete transport infrastructure amounted to one percent of China's GDP as recently as the most current survey (mid-1990s). Logistic costs account for 20% of a product's price in China, compared to 10% in the United States, and 5% in other developed countries.

Ports are being improved for greater use of China's waterways, and airports are being improved across the country. Related industries such as construction equipment, engineering, container security, and electronics and safety devices have also grown rapidly.

== Regulation ==
=== Mainland China ===
Transport in mainland China is regulated by the Ministry of Transport and its subordinate departments such as the National Railway Administration and the Civil Aviation Administration of China.

=== Special administrative regions ===
The aforementioned transport authorities have no jurisdiction in Hong Kong and Macau. Hong Kong's transport is regulated by the Transport Department of Hong Kong, whereas Macau's transport is regulated by the Transport Bureau of Macau.

== Rail ==
Current railway network in China, including HSR lines

Rail is the major mode of transport in China. In 2019, railways in China delivered 3.660 billion passenger trips, generating 1,470.66 billion passenger-kilometres and carried 4.389 billion tonnes of freight, generating 3,018 billion cargo tonne-kilometres; both traffic volumes are among the highest in the world. The high volume of traffic that China's railway system carries makes it critical to China's economy. China's railway system carries 24% of the world's railway transport volume on only 6% of the world's railways. China has the world's second longest railway network; as of 2020 it is 146,300 km (90,907 mi) long. About 71.9% of the network is electrified in 2019.

In 2011 China's railway inventory included 19,431 locomotives owned by the national railway system. The inventory in recent times included some 100 steam locomotives, but the last such locomotive, built in 1999, is now in service as a tourist attraction while the others have been retired from commercial service. The remaining locomotives are either diesel- or electric-powered. Another 352 locomotives are owned by local railroads and 604 operated by joint-venture railways. National railway freight cars numbered 622,284 and passenger coaches 52,130 .

Because of its limited capital, overburdened infrastructure, and need to continuously modernize, the national rail system, which is controlled by the Ministry of Railways through a network of regional divisions, operates on an austere budget. Foreign capital investment in the freight sector was allowed beginning in 2003, and international public stock offerings opened in 2006. In another move to better capitalize and reform the rail system, the Ministry of Railways established three public shareholder-owned companies in 2003: China Railways Container Transport Company, China Railway Special Cargo Service Company, and China Railways Parcel Express Company.

In recent decades, rail use in China has seen significant growth in the volume of goods and passengers transported. Since 1980, the volume of goods transported (metric tons times kilometers traveled) has increased by 305% and the volume of passengers (million passengers times kilometers traveled) has increased by 485%. During this same time period, total length of rail lines has only increased by 34%.

=== Statistics ===
	1980	1990	2000	2010	2014	2015	2017
Rail lines (total route-km)	49,940	53,378	58,656	66,239	66,989		
Goods transported on railways (metric tons times kilometers traveled)	570,732	1,060,100	1,333,606	2,451,185	2,308,669		
Passengers carried on railways (million passengers times kilometers traveled)	138,037	263,530	441,468	791,158	807,065		
Urban rail transit (kilometers)							5,033
Subway (kilometers)							3,844
Urban rail transit under construction (kilometers)							6,246
Bus rapid transit (kilometers)						2,991	

=== Regional development ===
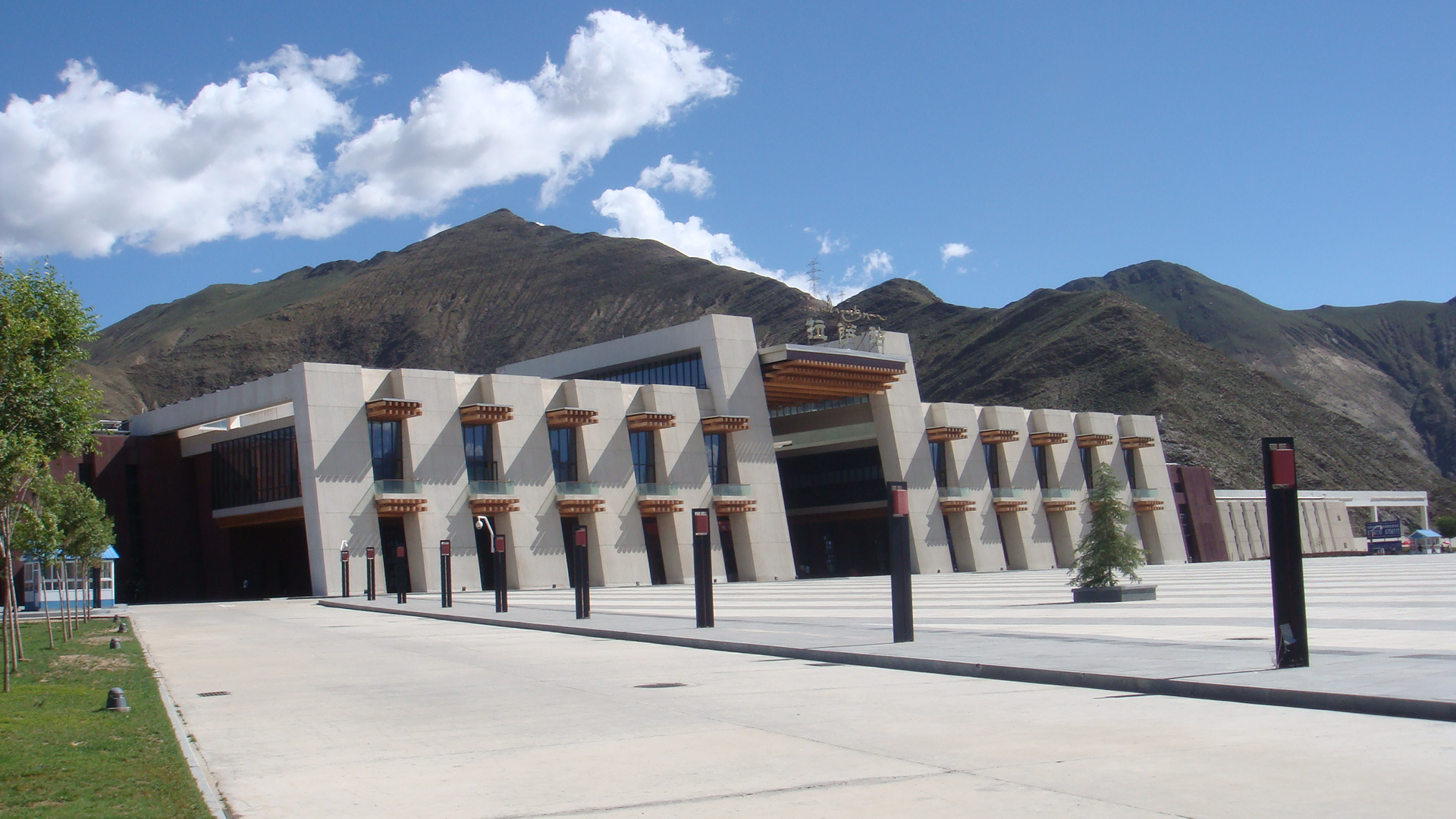
Lhasa railway station

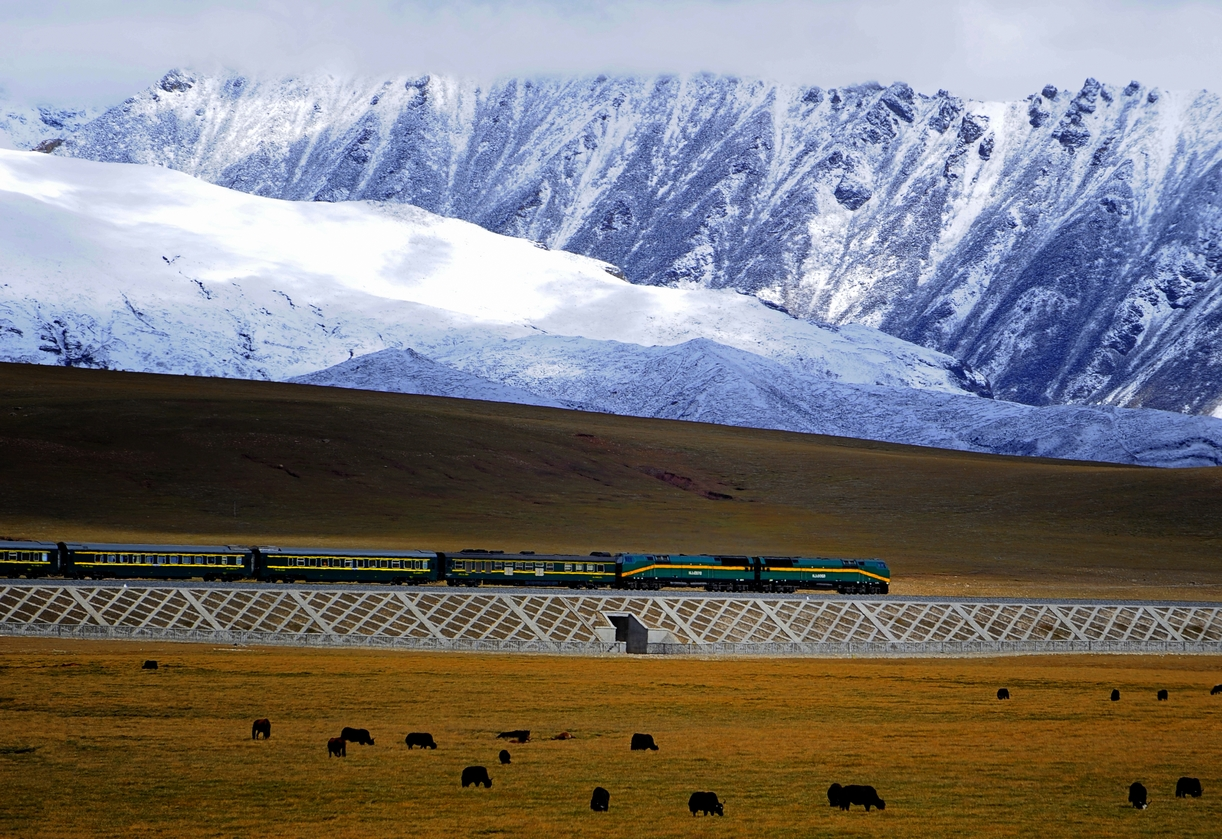
A train pulled by an NJ2 locomotive travels on the Qingzang railway in 2008.

In 1992, a new large-scale rail project was launched in China, called the "New Silk Road" or "Eurasian Continental Bridge" project. The project involved the modernization and infrastructure development of a 4,131 km (2,567 mi) railroad route starting in Lianyungang, Jiangsu, and traveling through central and northwestern China to Urumqi, Xinjiang, to the Alataw Pass into Kazakhstan. From that point, the railroad links to some 6,800 km (4,225 mi) of routes that end in Rotterdam.

China also has established rail links between seaports and interior export-processing zones. For example, in 2004 Chengdu in Sichuan was linked to the Shenzhen Special Economic Zone in coastal Guangdong; exports clear customs in Chengdu and are shipped twice daily by rail to the seaport at Shenzhen for fast delivery.

==== Tibet ====
A 1,080 km (671 mi) section of the Qingzang railway has been completed from Golmud to Lhasa. The 815 km (506 mi) section from Xining to Golmud in Qinghai opened to traffic in 1984. The railway's highest point, the Tanggula Mountain Pass, is 5,072 m above sea level, making it the highest railway in the world. More than 960 km (597 mi), or over four-fifths of the railway, is at an altitude of more than 4,000 m, and over half of it was laid on frozen earth. Because of the high altitudes, carriages are supplied with supplemental oxygen.

Linking Lhasa and Shigatse together in Tibet, the construction of a 254 km (158 mi) extension line of the Qingzang railway started in 2009 with completion expected by 2014.

=== High-speed rail ===
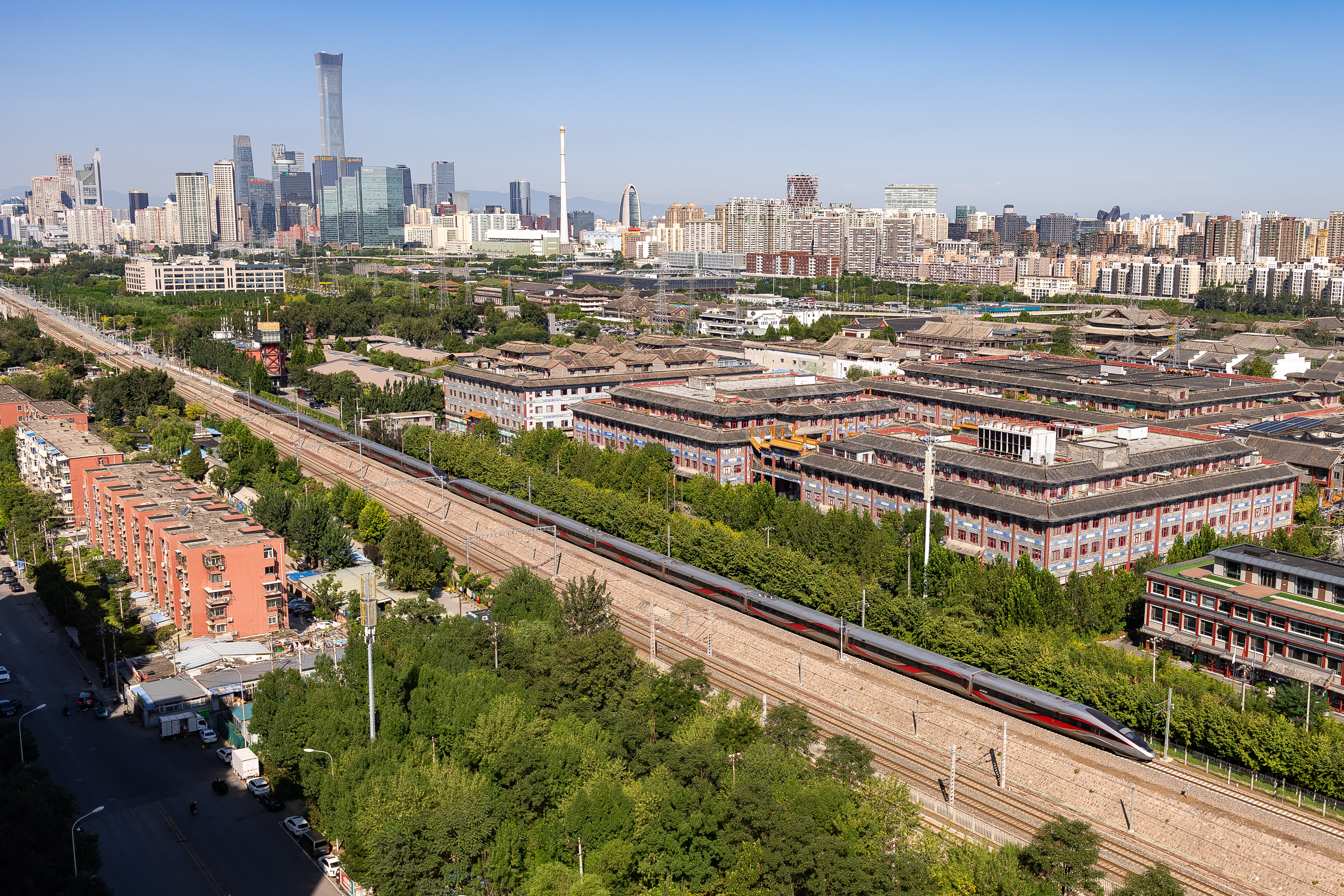
High speed train passing the Beijing central business district

The high-speed service is mainly operated by China Railway High-speed. HSR developed rapidly in China over the past 15 years thanks to generous funding from the Chinese government. With ridership exceeding 1.44 billion in 2016, China's HSR service was the most heavily used in the world. In 2016, the network is the longest in the world and accounted for about two-thirds of the world's high-speed rail tracks and operated with 2,595 high-speed trains, accounting for about 60 percent of all global high-speed trains.

=== Maglev ===
China also has the world's first commercial high-speed maglev (magnetic levitation) service, Shanghai Maglev Train (the first maglev service opened at Birmingham International Airport, United Kingdom, in 1984; however, it was not high-speed). The Chinese project, a Sino-German joint venture, was a 38 km-long route between downtown Shanghai and the Pudong airport that opened in 2003. The project cost US$1.2 billion. Low speed commuter maglevs using ingenious technology have opened in Changsha (Changsha Maglev) and Beijing (Line S1, Beijing Subway).

In January 2021 a prototype for a new high-speed maglev train capable of 620 km/h (390 mph) was unveiled. Developed by Southwest Jiaotong University near Chengdu, Professor He Chuan, vice president of the university, told reporters that the train is scheduled to be operational within 3–10 years. In July 2021 the CRRC unveiled a four-car 600 km/h (370 mph) maglev train. Long test tracks are being developed to test the vehicles.

=== Railway links with adjoining countries ===
The two railway links China have with a neighboring country that does not have a break of gauge is with North Korea and Vietnam. China also has links with Kazakhstan, Mongolia and Russia, which all use the 1,520 mm (4 ft 11 27/32 in) gauge, and with Vietnam, where the 1,000 mm (3 ft 3 3/8 in) gauge is still in use. The Trans-Siberian Railway, which crosses Russia, has a branch that sweeps down from Ulan-Ude, across Mongolia, and on to Beijing.

China does not have a direct rail link with Afghanistan, Bhutan, India, Kyrgyzstan, Nepal, Pakistan or Tajikistan, but is currently planning links with Laos and India (via Myanmar).

Variable-gauge-axle trains are sometimes used to overcome the break of gauge with neighboring countries. The mainland is also linked to Hong Kong, but not with Macau, although a Macau link is planned.

=== Urban Rail ===
==== Rapid Transit ====
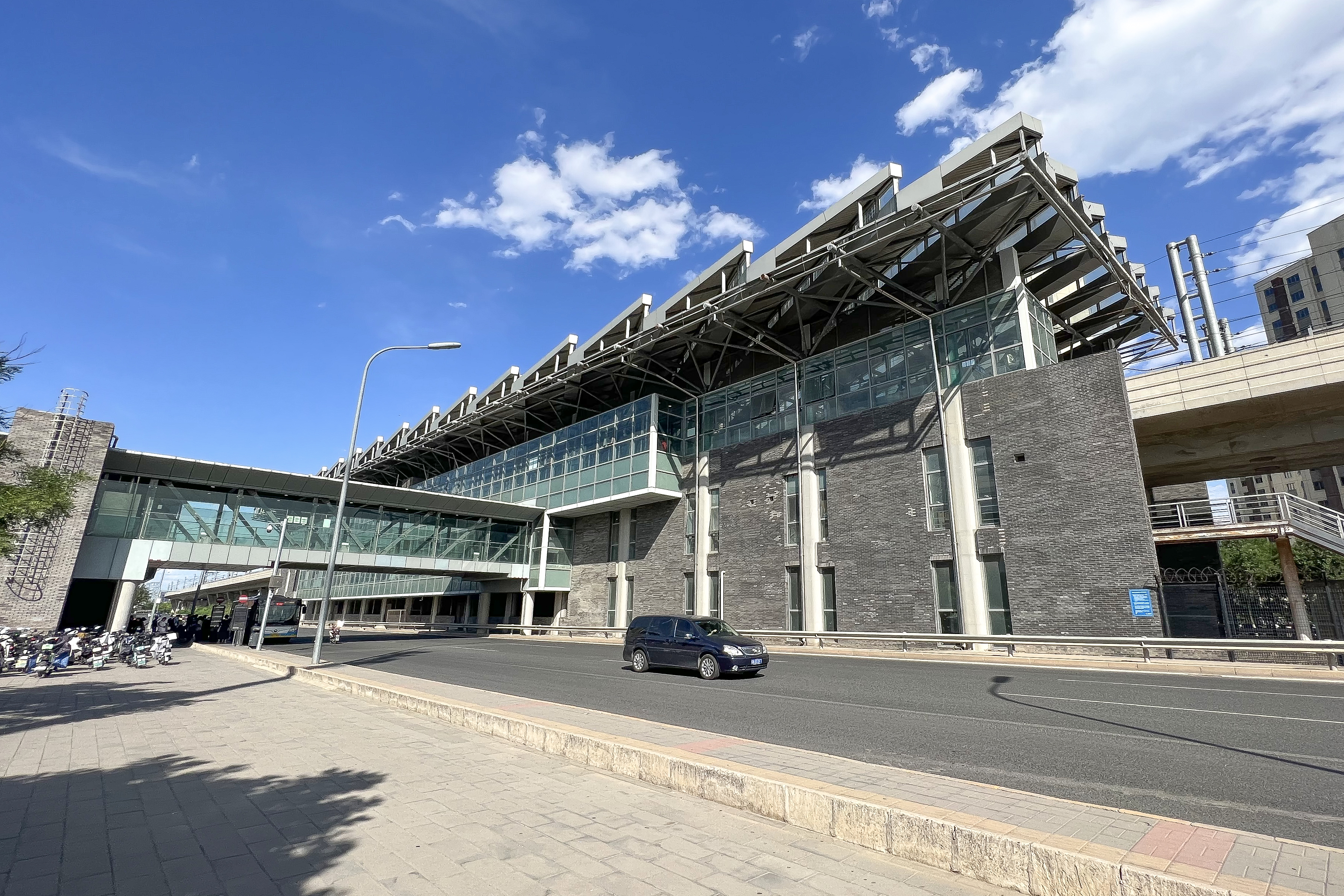
Zhangguozhuang station on Line 14, Beijing Subway

As of 2025, there are at least 50 rapid transit systems in mainland China. While it is difficult to gauge the number of systems and lines under construction or being planned at any given time, the rapid development of mass rapid transit in China suggests that new metro systems, lines, and extensions are constantly emerging and being rapidly developed. Today, China boasts nine of the world's ten longest metro systems. Furthermore, of the 50 longest metro systems in the world, 26 are in mainland China; Hong Kong and Taipei also make the list. The Shanghai Metro only started operating in 1993 and has since expanded to be the world's longest or second-longest subway system, trading places only with the Beijing Subway. In Mainland China, 23 urban rail lines are expected to start construction in 2025.

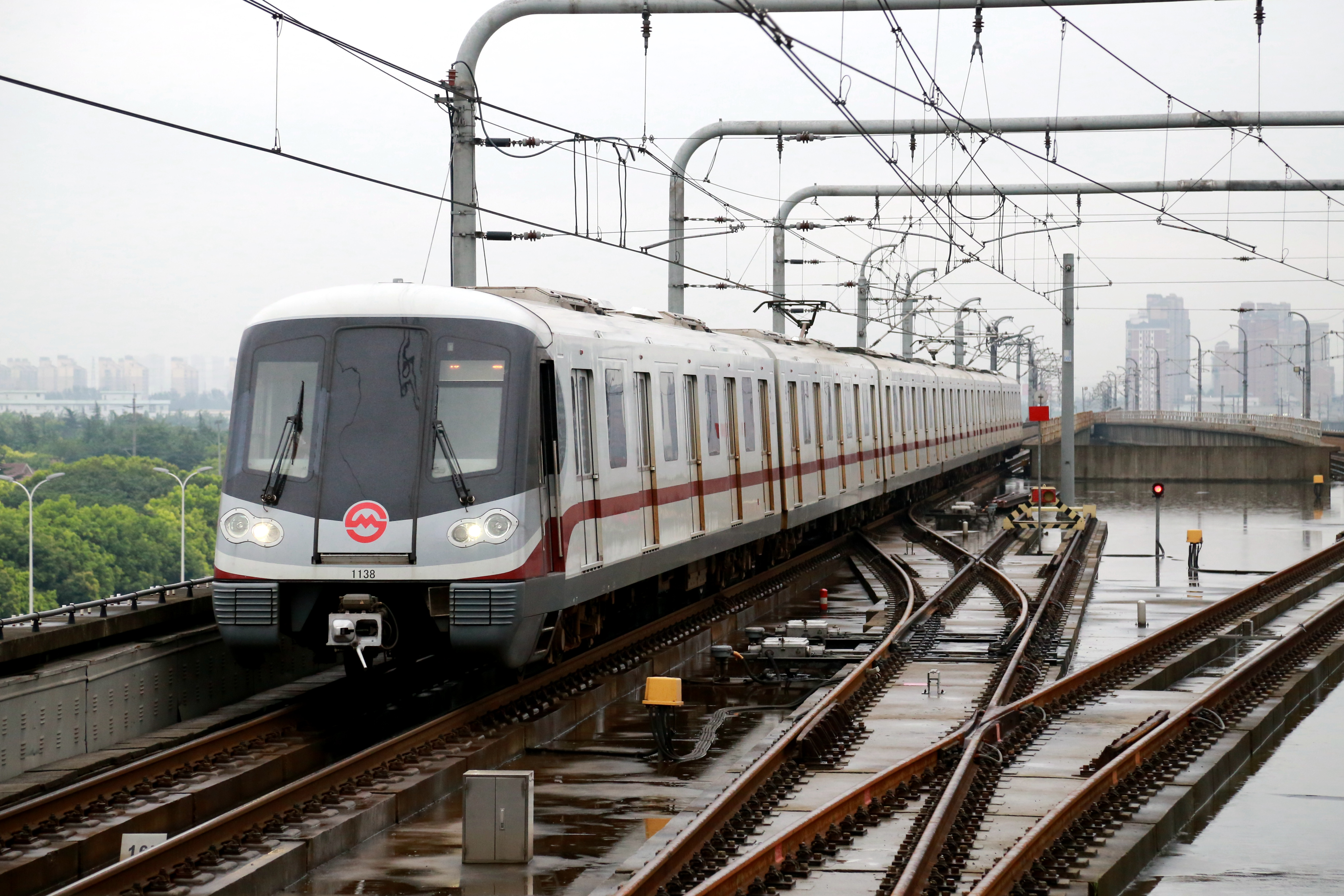
A Line 11 train arriving at Nanxiang station of Shanghai Metro.

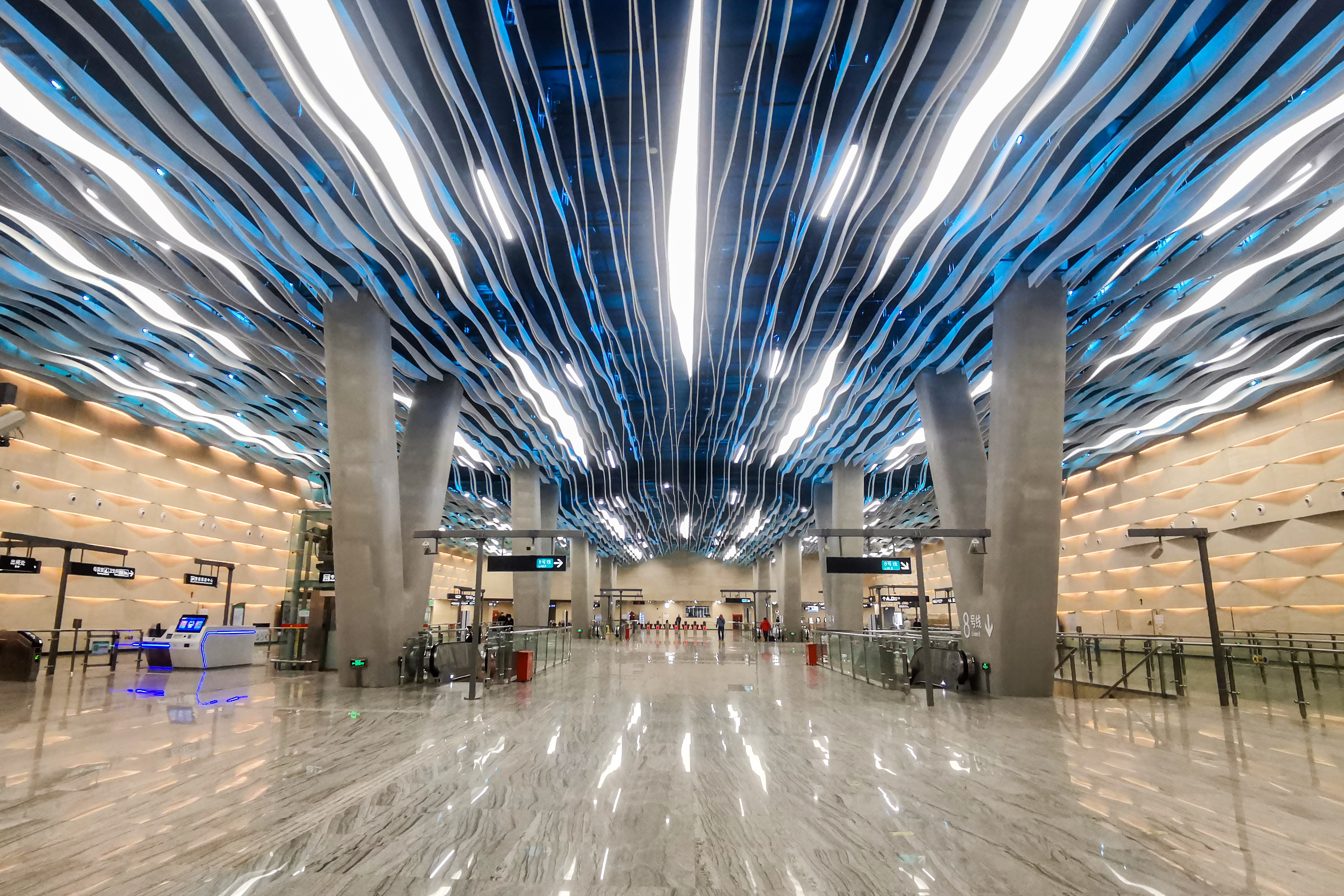
Caihongqiao station of Line 8, Guangzhou Metro

==== Light Rail/Tram ====
Several cities in China had tram systems during the 20th century; however, by the end of the century, only Dalian, Hong Kong and Changchun remained. Since 2010, then new tram systems opened in Qingdao, Guangzhou, Shenzhen, Shenyang, Suzhou, Zhuhai, and Huai'an.

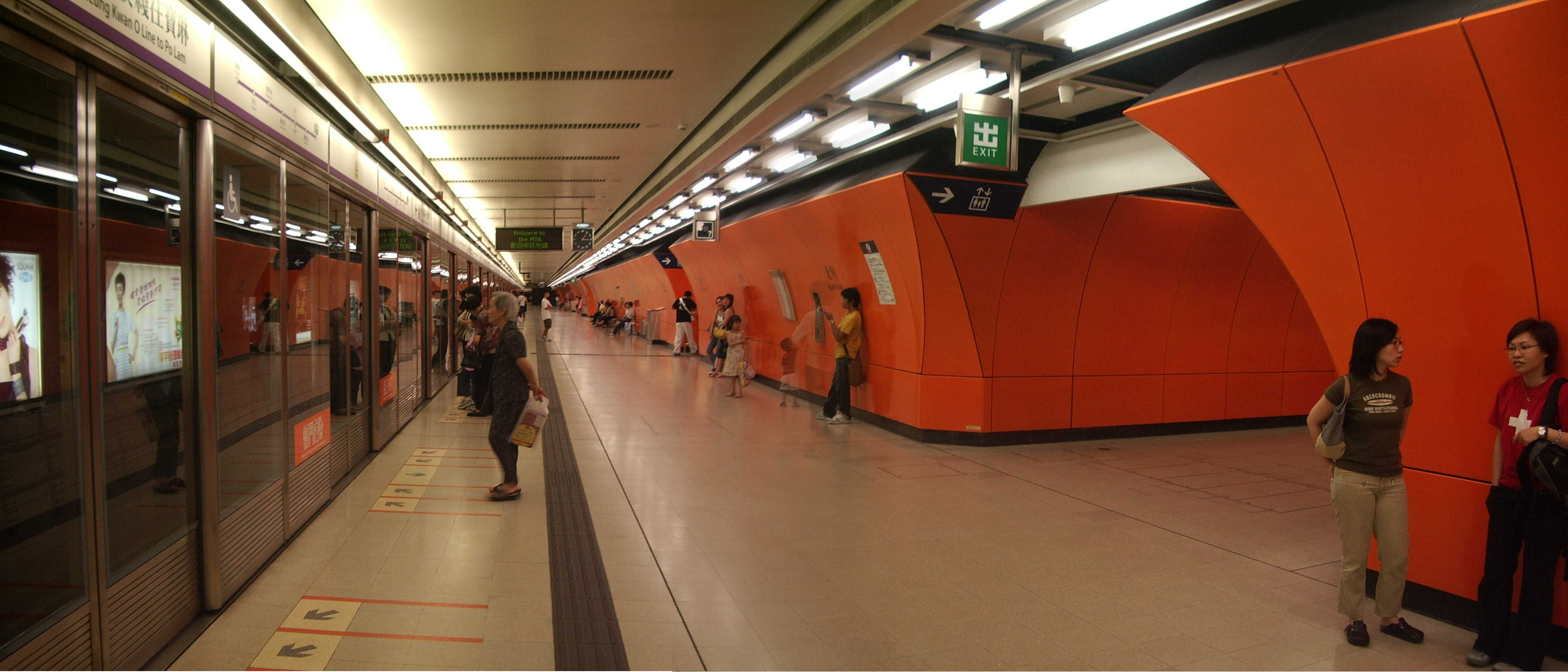
North Point station on Island line, MTR

In 2016 a Chinese firm developed the Autonomous Rail Rapid Transit system which has been described as a crossover between a train, a bus and a tram and is commonly called a "trackless tram". As of 2021 the system has four lines in operation and is being considered for a number of other locations around the country.

==== Monorail ====
China has installed a number of straddle-type rubber-tyred monorail systems since 2005. The longest monorail line in the world, at 66.2 km (41.1 mi), is Line 3 located in Chongqing. A large number of other transit systems are under construction, as well as tourist lines using suspended monorail technology.

==== Suburban and commuter rail systems ====
China's passenger railways are mostly used for medium- and long-distance travel, with few trains stopping anywhere but at major stations in center cities. Commuter rail systems, characteristic of large European and North American cities, were initially uncommon in China. Instead radial suburban metro lines (Shanghai Metro Line 16, Binhai Mass Transit Line 9, Guangfo Metro, etc.) were mostly fulfilling that role. However a number of high-speed regional networks such as the Chengdu–Dujiangyan ICR, Changsha–Zhuzhou–Xiangtan ICR, Pearl River Delta Rapid Transit, and Wuhan Metropolitan Area Intercity Railway have recently started providing commuter services.

==== Rail transit in Hong Kong SAR ====
Hong Kong Mass Transit Railway was planned, designed, constructed and opened under British administration; it was opened in 1979 and merged with the KCR network in 2007 to form a 10-line heavy metro operation and a modern light rail network. In addition, a tramway system operates on Hong Kong Island.

==== Rail transit in Macau SAR ====
The Macau LRT was first proposed in 2003, but a final go-ahead was not given until a public announcement by the Government of Macau in October 2006. The Macau Light Transit System currently operates three lines: the Taipa Line, which connects Taipa (including Macau International Airport), Cotai, and the Macau Peninsula; the Hengqin Line, a two-station line which connects Hengqin Island to Lotus Station, and the Seac Pai Van Line, a two-station southern link connecting Union Hospital with Seac Pai Van. The Taipa Line opened on 10 December 2019, while the Seac Pai Van and Hengqin lines opened on 1 November 2024 and 2 December 2024, respectively. The East Line, which will connect the eastern terminus of the Taipa Line at Taipa Ferry Terminal with the Macau Peninsula, began construction in 2023 and is expected to open in 2028.

As of February 2025, all lines on the LRT use Mitsubishi Heavy Industries Crystal Mover APM vehicles that are two-car trains and fully automated. The car is named Ocean Cruiser. All LRT stations are equipped with platform screen doors.

== Road ==
=== Motor vehicles ===
NTHS System

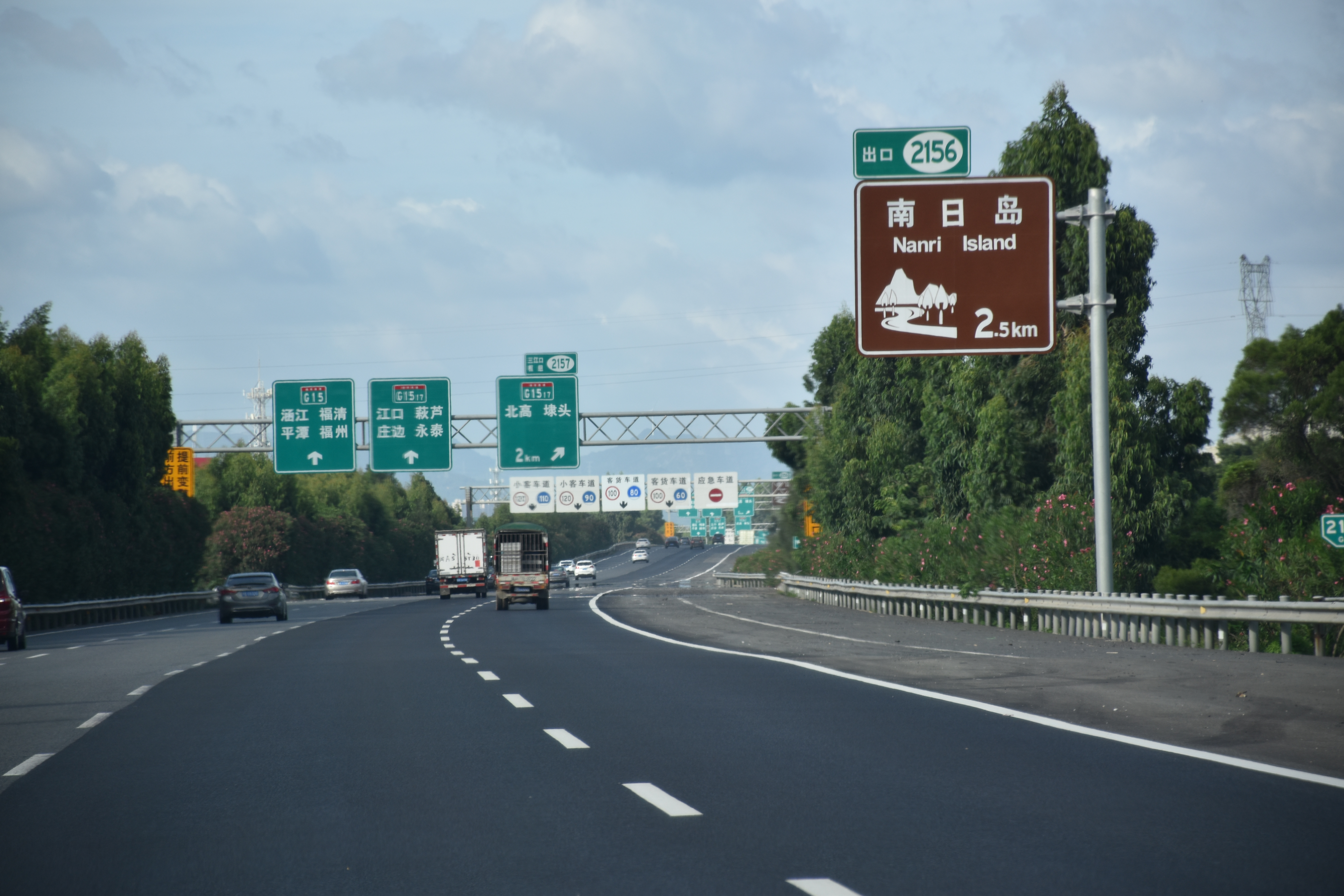
A section of G15 Shenyang–Haikou Expressway, part of the NTHS

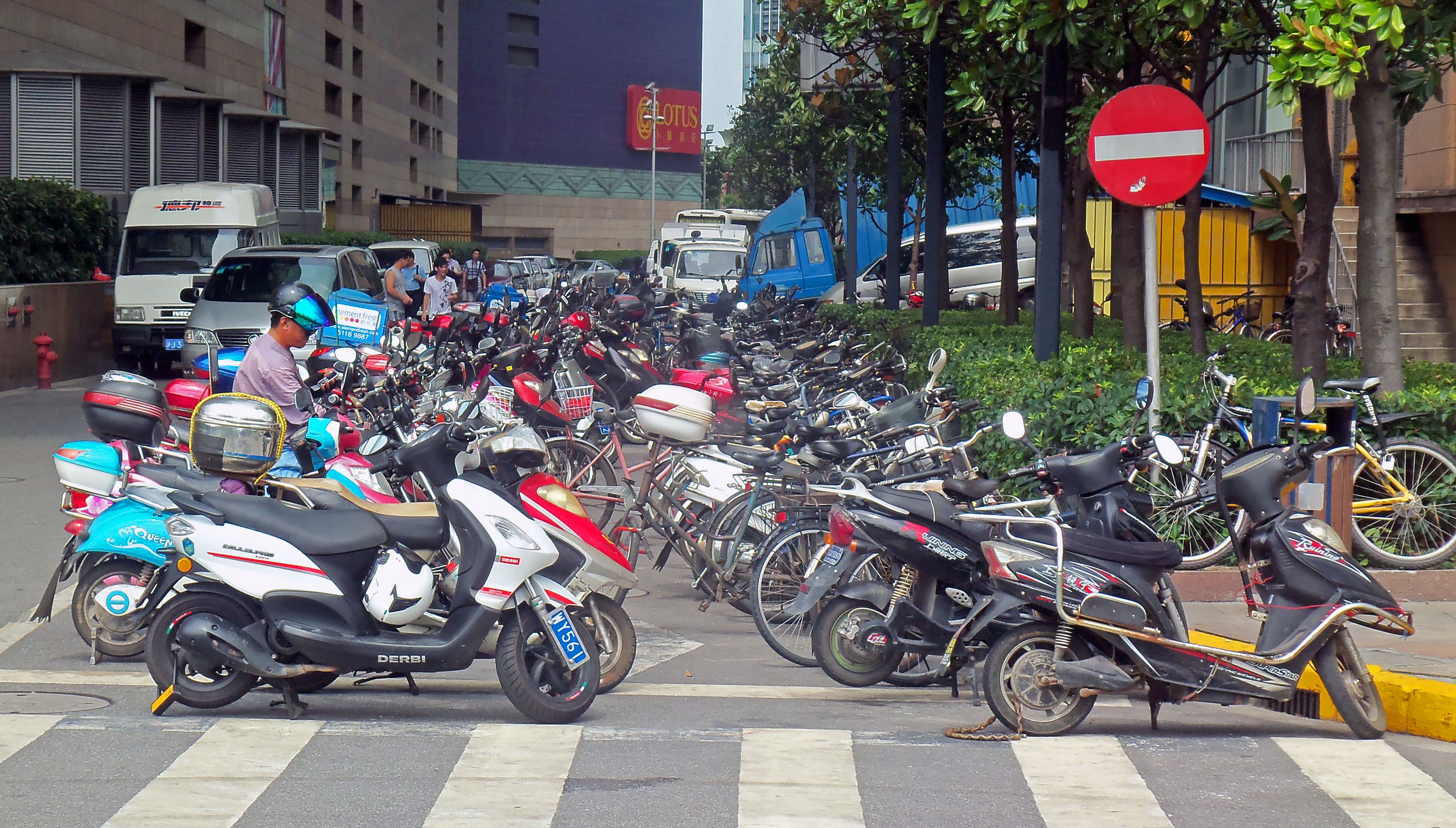
Many Chinese still use motorbike or e-bike (seen here parked on a Shanghai street) to get around, but it is forbidden in some major cities.

During the war with Japan, in the 1930s, China built many roads, the most famous of which is the Burma Road that leads southwest from Kunming to the city of Lashio. Since it came into power, the Communist government initiated a large effort into building highways that extend across China and beyond its borders.

Today, China is linked by an evolving network of highways (China National Highways) and expressways (Expressways of China). In the past few years, China has been rapidly developing its road network. Between 1990 and 2003, the total length of urban roads in China more than doubled; increasing from 95,000 to 208,000 kilometers of roads during that period. Similarly, during the same period of time, the total area allocated to roads more than tripled; from 892 million square meters in 1990, to 3,156.5 million square meters in 2003. China National Highways stretch to all four corners of mainland China. Expressways reach the same destinations as China National Highways, except for the rugged terrain of Tibet. An expressway link is already at the planning stage.

Highways (totaling 130,000 km) were critical to China's economic growth as it worked to mitigate a poor distribution network and authorities sought to spur economic activity directly. The highway and road systems carried nearly 11.6 billion tons of freight and 769.6 trillion passenger/kilometers in 2003.

The importance of highways and motor vehicles, which carry 13.5% of cargo and 49.1% of passengers, was growing rapidly in the mid-2000s. Automobile usage has increased significantly in urban areas as incomes rise. However, as of 2009, car ownership was still low in comparison to the other members of the BRIC group of countries, being exceeded by Russia and Brazil. Indeed, the rate of car ownership in China is only expected to meet the 1960s level of car ownership of some developed countries in 2015.

In 2002, excluding military and probably internal security vehicles, there were 12 million passenger cars and buses in operation and 8.1 million other vehicles. In 2003 China reported that 23.8 million vehicles were used for business purposes, including 14.8 million passenger vehicles and 8.5 million trucks. The latest statistics from the Beijing Municipal Statistics Bureau show that Beijing had nearly 1.3 million privately owned cars at the end of 2004 or 11 for each 100 Beijing residents. Beijing currently has the highest annual rate of private car growth in China, leading to major congestion in the capital.

In 2005 China had a total road network of more than 3.3 million km, although approximately 1.47 million km of this network are classified as "village roads". Paved roads totaled 770,265 km (478,620 mi) in 2004; the remainder were gravel, improved earth standard, or merely earth tracks.

Some 270,000 km (167,770 mi) of rural highways will be built and upgraded in 2008. By comparison, 423,000 km (262,840 mi) of countryside highways were built or upgraded in 2007, a record high. According to China's Transport Ministry, as of the end of 2007, 98.54 percent of villages and towns had already been connected by highways.

The 2008 construction plan comprises five north–south highway trunk roads and seven east–west trunk roads and eight inter-provincial roads. Meanwhile, the central and local governments have continued to allocate funds to support the countryside highway build-up and step up construction quality supervision.

By the end of 2010, the total length of all public roads in China reached 3,984,000 km, with about 97,000 km (60,273 mi) of expressways by the end of 2012. All major cities are expected to be linked with a 108,000 km (67,108 mi) inter-provincial expressway system by 2020.

=== Motor vehicles safety ===
RTA fatalities are vulnerable users (68%), including motorcycle, pedestrian and NMW.

Vehicle is in cause in 17% of road fatalities.

Fatalities are 497 for 8.2 million inhabitants in Hainan, and 9959 for 83 million people in Guangdong in 2005.

=== Bus rapid transit ===
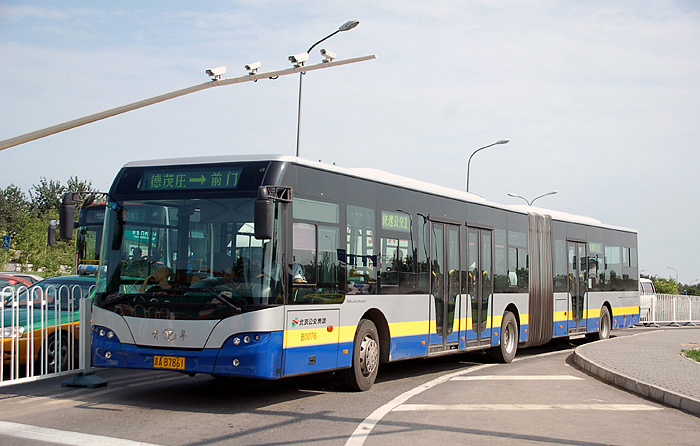
Beijing BRT Line 1. Note the doors on the left-hand side of the bus -- the BRT line uses central island platforms for most of its route.

A number of BRT systems started operating in China, including the high capacity Guangzhou BRT. More than 30 projects are being implemented or studied in China in some big cities. In 2018, 99% of all electric buses globally were registered in the People's Republic of China.

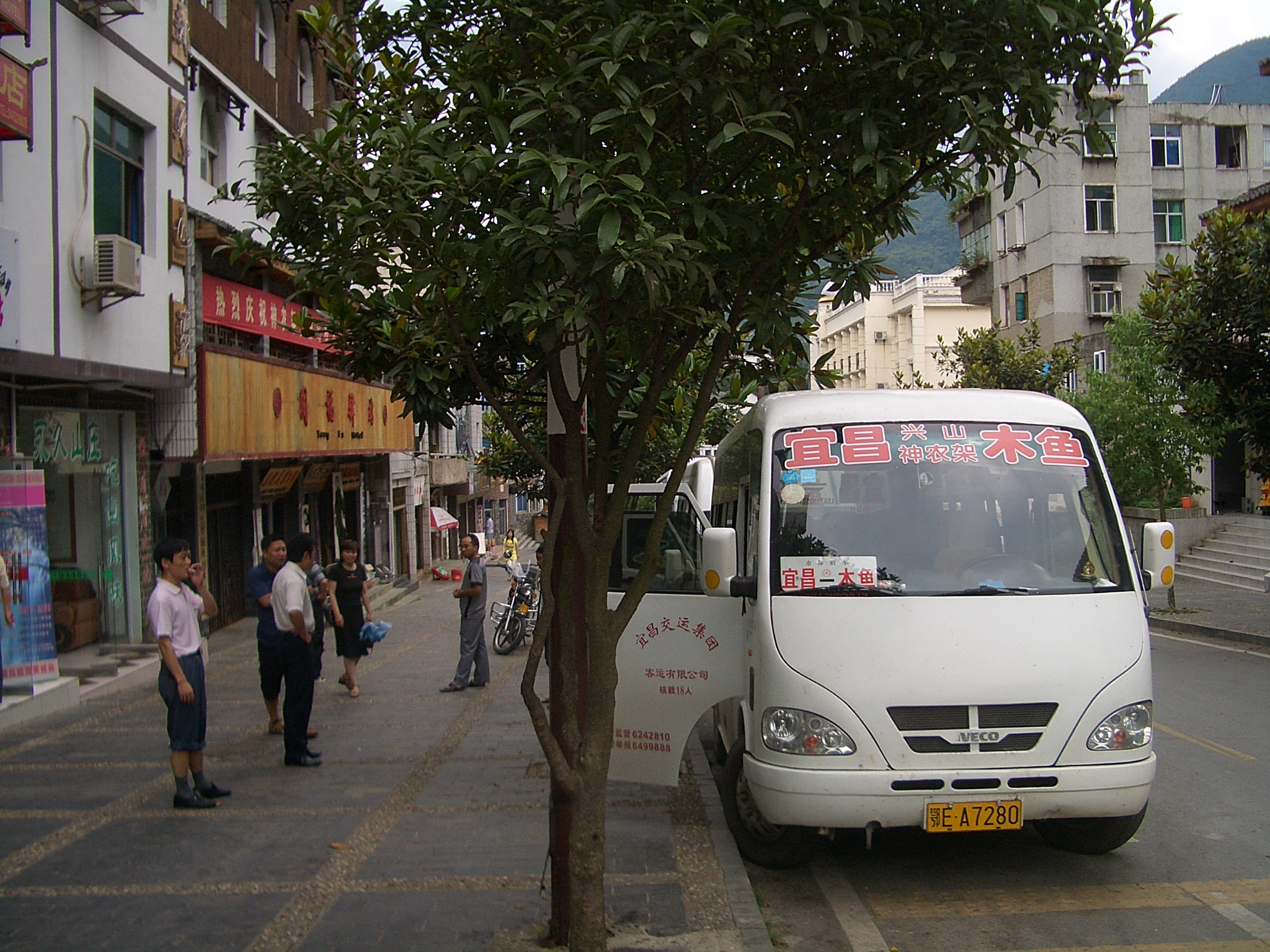
Shuttle buses like this link smaller towns with regional centers.

=== Trolleybus systems ===
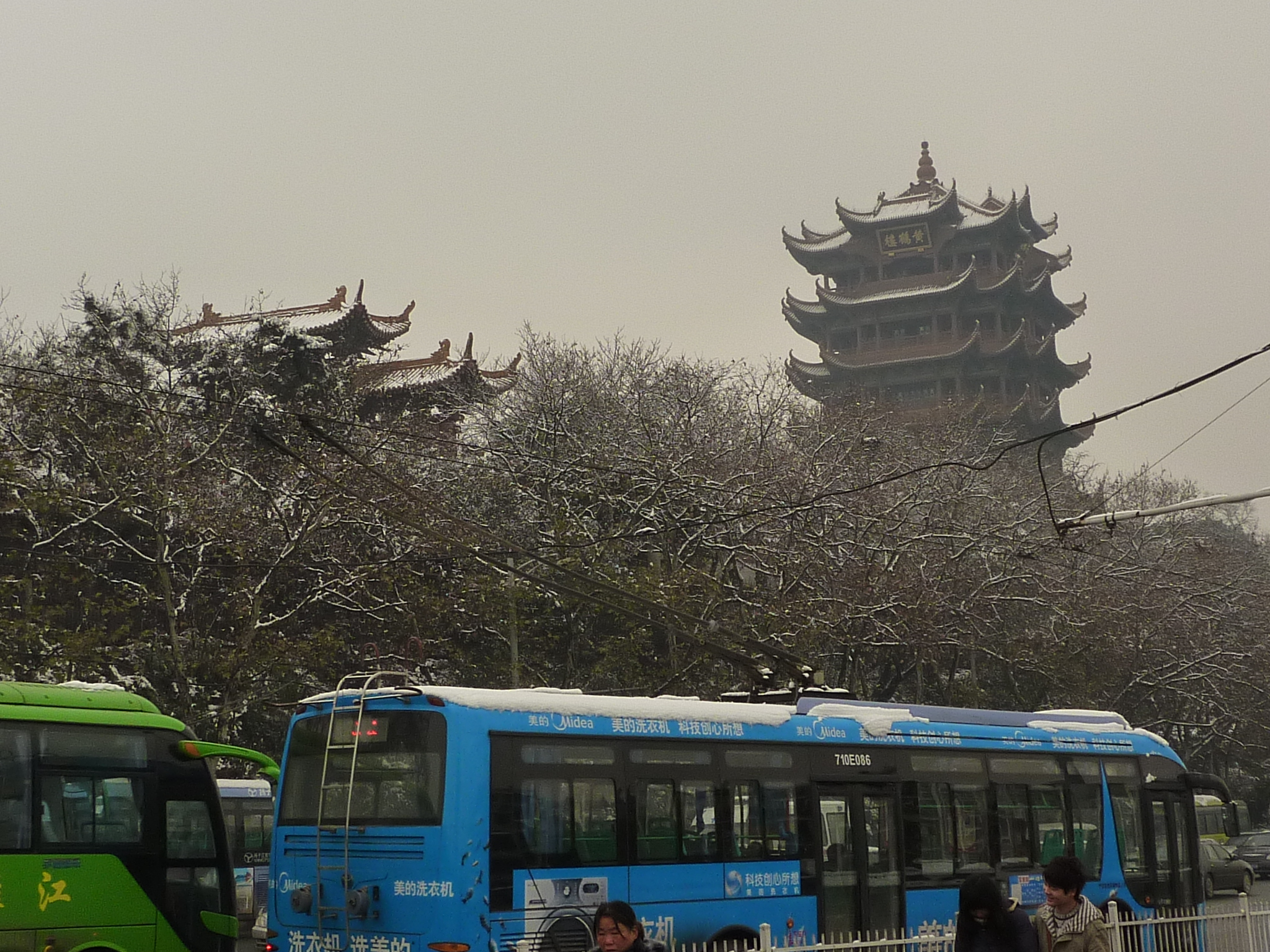
A trolleybus passes the Yellow Crane Tower in Wuhan.

As of 2013, trolleybuses provide a portion of the public transit service in 10 Chinese cities. At one time, as many as 27 cities were served by trolleybuses, comprising 28 systems, as Wuhan had two independent trolleybus systems. The Shanghai trolleybus system, which remains in operation, opened in 1914 and is the longest-lived trolleybus system in the world. All other trolleybus systems in China opened after 1950.

=== Electric bicycles ===
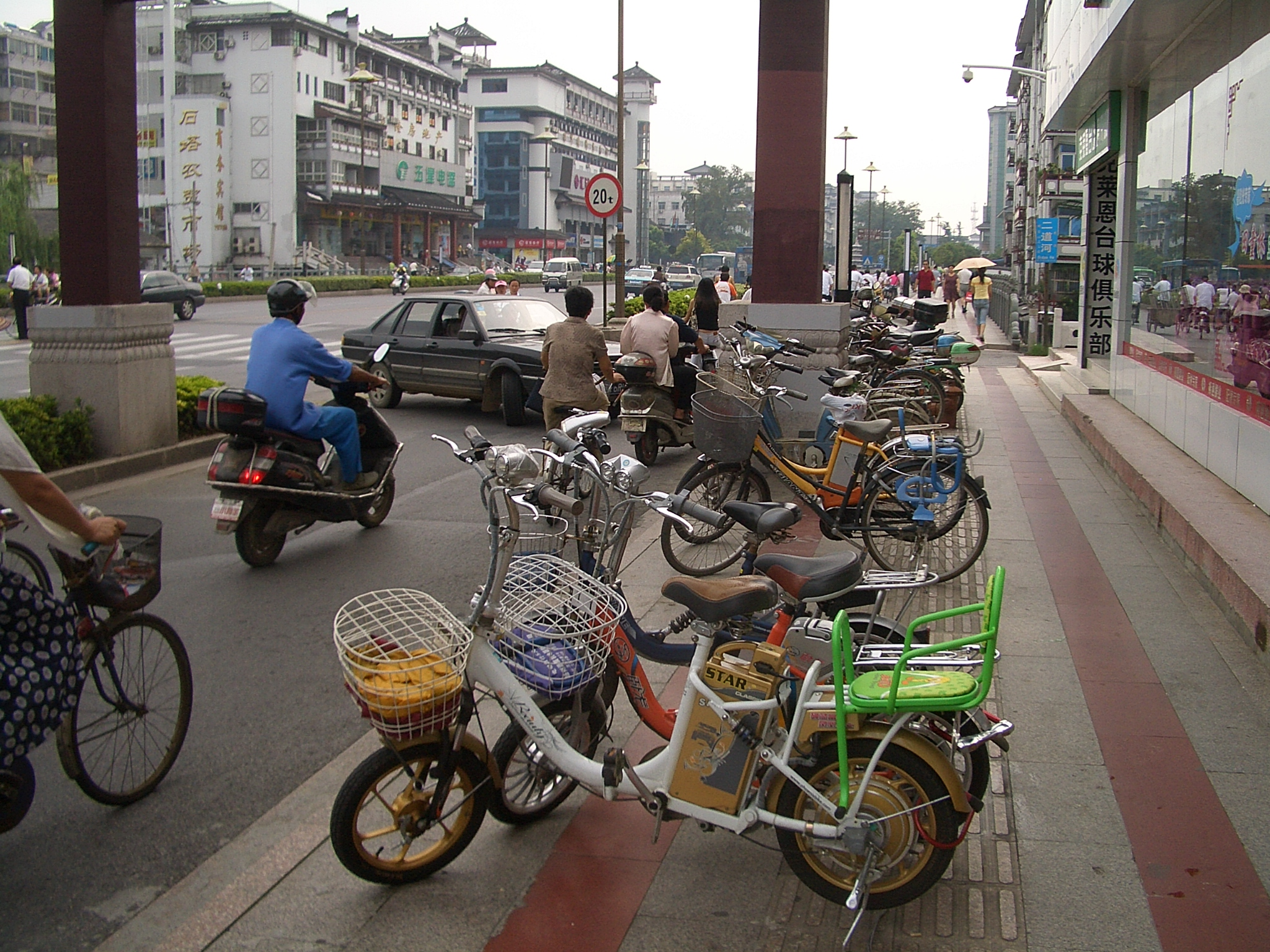
Electric bicycles are very common in many cities of China, such as Yangzhou; in some areas they outnumber motorcycles or regular bicycles.

China is the world's leading producer of electric bicycles. According to the data of the China Bicycle Association, a government-chartered industry group, in 2004 China's manufacturers sold 7.5 million electric bicycles nationwide, which was almost twice 2003 sales; domestic sales reached 10 million in 2005, and 16 to 18 million in 2006. By 2007, electric bicycles were thought to make up 10 to 20 percent of all two-wheeled vehicles on the streets of many major cities. A typical unit requires 8 hours to charge the battery, which provides the range of 25–30 miles (40–50 km), at the speed of around 20 km/h (12 mph), however people usually illegal override, makes it just like normal motorcycles, capable of reach nearly 100 km/h (62 mph). A large number of such vehicles is exported from China as well (3 million units, worth 40 billion yuan ($5.8 billion), in 2006 alone),

=== Bikeshare ===
As of May 2011, the Wuhan and Hangzhou Public Bicycle bike-share systems in China were the largest in the world, with around 90,000 and 60,000 bicycles respectively. Of the world's 15 biggest public bike share programs 13 of them are in China. By 2013, China had a combined fleet of 650,000 public bikes. China has seen a rise in popularity with privately run app driven "dockless" bike shares with fleets that dwarf systems outside of China. One such bike share alone, Mobike, operates 100,000 dockless bikes in each of the cities of Shanghai, Beijing, Shenzhen and Guangzhou. Overall, there are more than 30 private bike share operators including Mobike, ofo, and Bluegogo, that have put over 3 million dockless shared bikes in various cities across China.

== Bridges ==
During the infrastructure boom of the past two decades, bridge-building has proceeded at a rapid pace on a vast scale. Notably, prior to the completion of the Wuhan Yangtze River Bridge in 1957, there were no bridges across the Yangtze River, China's longest, from Yibin to Shanghai, and all overland road and railways crossing this 2,884 km (1,792 mi.) stretch of the river required ferries. In 1992, there were only seven such bridges, but by the end of 2012, the tally had reached 73, including eight new openings in that year alone. Some notable bridges include:

- Chaotianmen Bridge, the largest arch bridge in the world by main span length
- Xihoumen Bridge, the second-longest suspension bridge in the world ranked by the length of the centre span
- Danyang–Kunshan Grand Bridge, the longest bridge of any type in the world
- Jiaozhou Bay Bridge, the world's longest bridge over water

== Air ==
As a result of the rapidly expanding civil aviation industry, by 2007 China had around 500 airports of all types and sizes in operation, about 400 of which had paved runways and about 100 of which had runways of 3,047 m or shorter. There also were 35 heliports in 2007, an increasingly used type of facility. With the additional airports came a proliferation of airlines.

=== Airlines ===
The Civil Aviation Administration of China (CAAC), also called the General Administration of Civil Aviation of China, was established as a government agency in 1949 to operate China's commercial air fleet. In 1988 CAAC's operational fleet was transferred to new, semiautonomous airlines and has served since as a regulatory agency.

In 2002 the government merged the nine largest airlines into three regional groups based in Beijing, Shanghai, and Guangzhou, respectively: Air China, China Eastern Airlines, and China Southern Airlines, which operate most of China's external flights.

By 2005 these three had been joined by six other major airlines: Hainan Airlines, Shanghai Airlines, Shandong Airlines, Xiamen Airlines, Shenzhen Airlines, and Sichuan Airlines. Together, these nine airlines had a combined fleet of some 860 aircraft, mostly Boeing from the United States and Airbus from Europe.

To meet growing demands for passenger and cargo capacity, in 2005 these airlines significantly expanded their fleets with orders placed for additional Boeing and Airbus aircraft expected to be delivered by 2010. In June 2006, it was announced that an Airbus A320 assembly plant would be built in the Binhai New Area of Tianjin, with the first aircraft to be delivered in 2008.

Air China owns 30% of Cathay Pacific (second largest shareholder) and the Civil Aviation Administration of China (CAAC), an administrative agency of the State Council, owns majority and controlling stakes in China Southern Airlines, China Eastern Airlines, and Air China.

The total number of planes of all mainland Chinese carriers combined will be near 1,580 by 2010, up from 863 in 2006. By 2025, the figure is estimated to be 4,000.

Twenty-seven airlines in mainland China handled 138 million passengers, and 22.17 million tons of cargo in 2005.

=== Airports ===
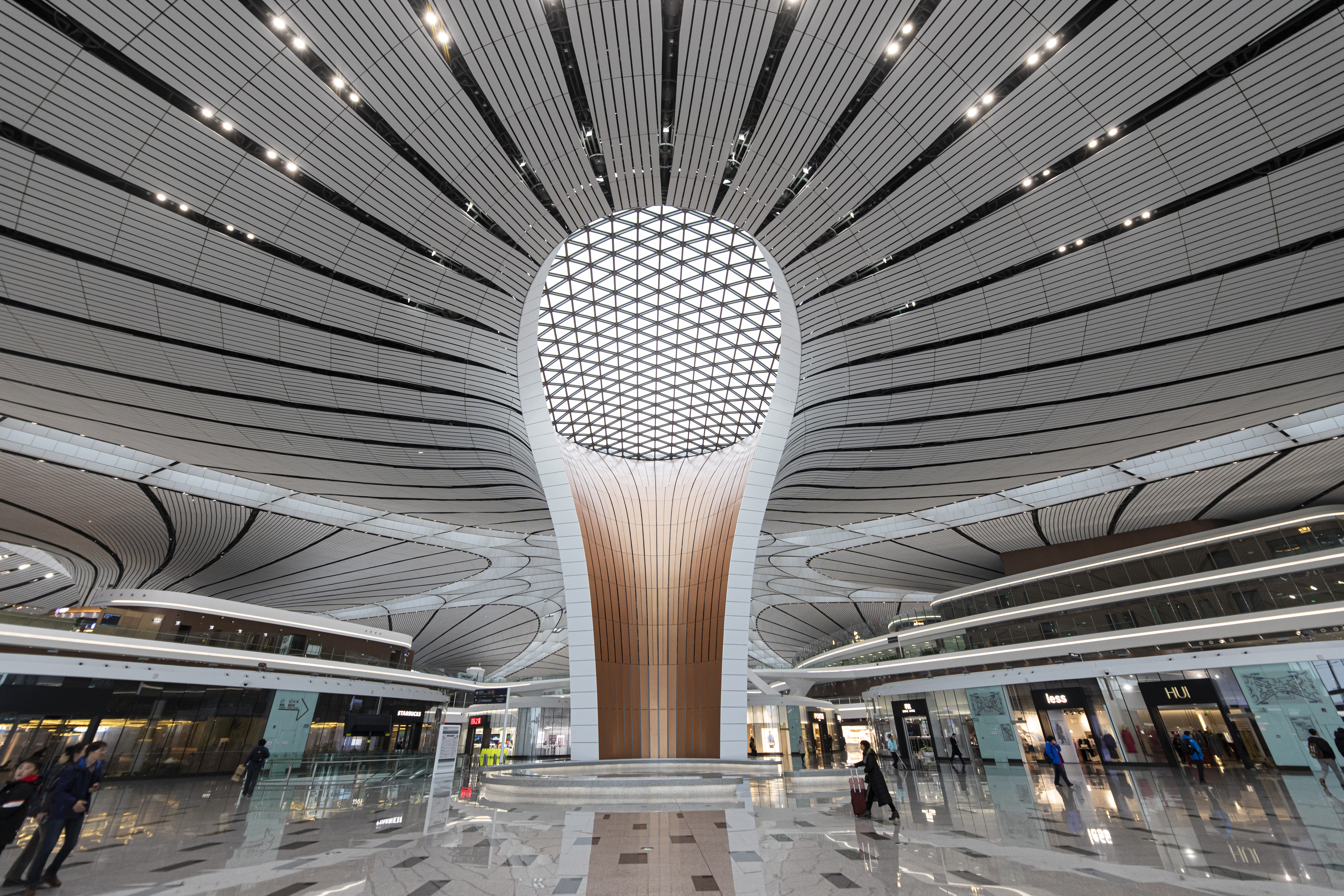
Interior of Beijing Daxing International Airport

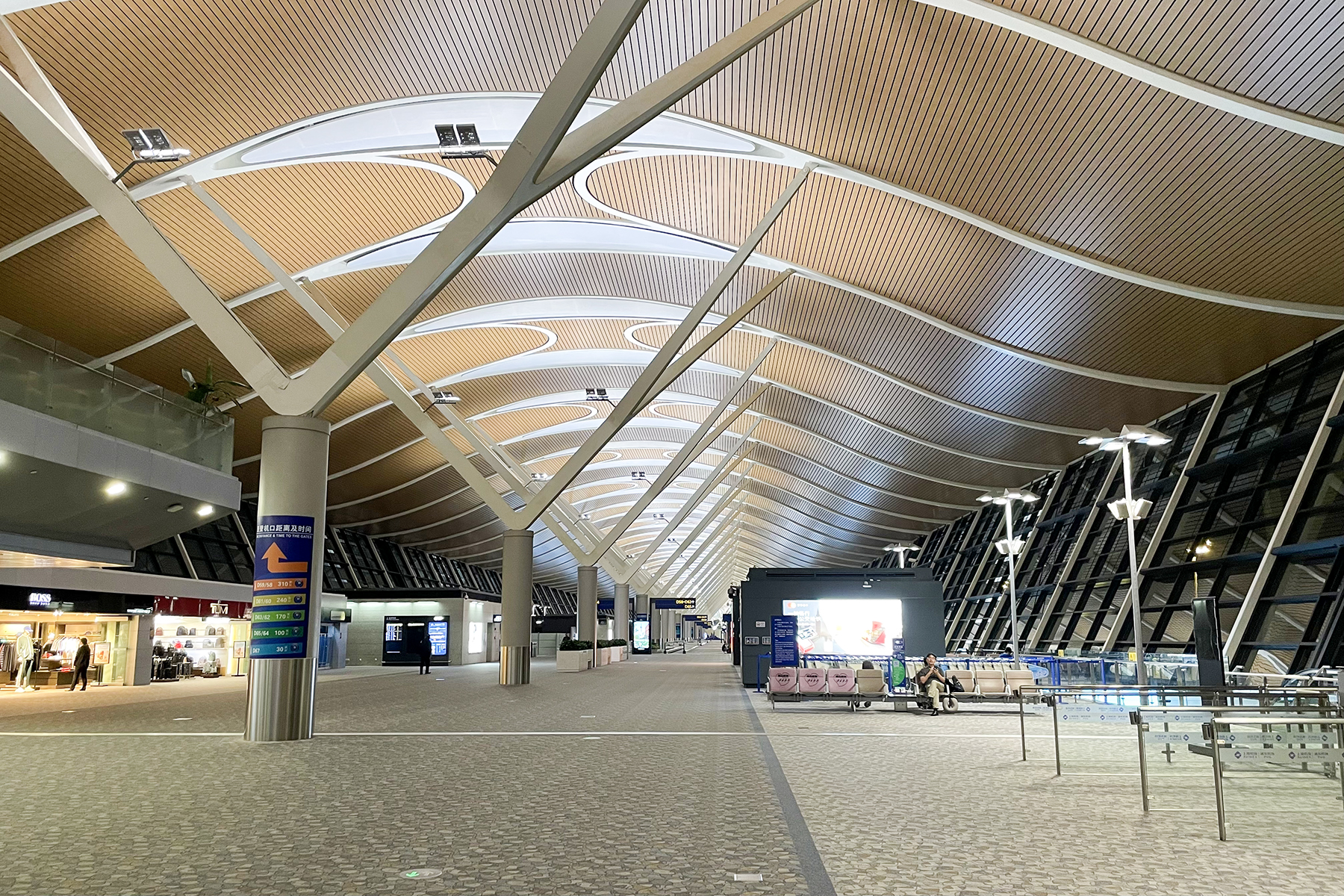
Interior of Shanghai Pudong International Airport

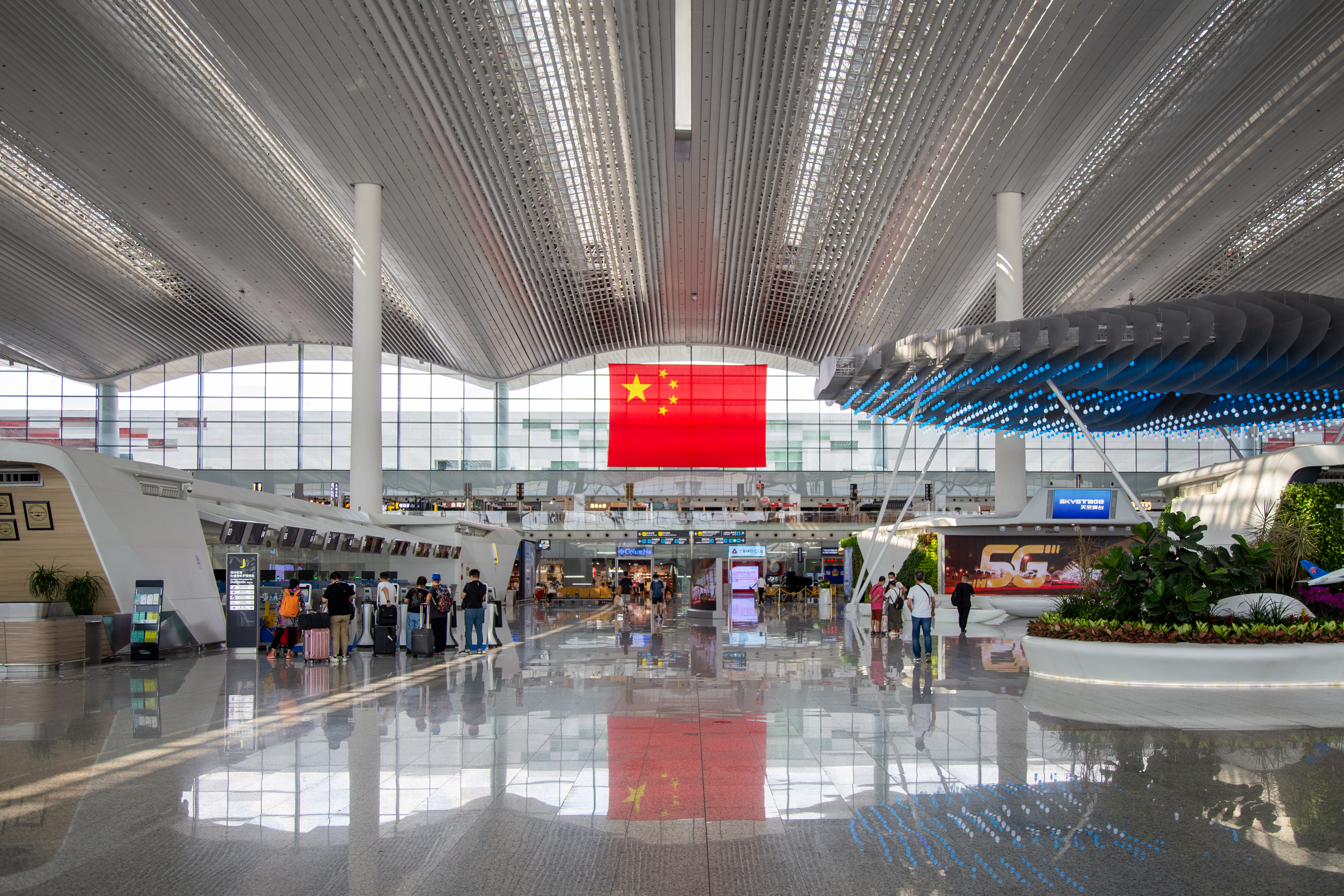
Interior of Guangzhou Baiyun International Airport

In 2007 China had 467 airports. Of China's major airports, Beijing Capital International Airport (PEK), located 27 km (17 mi) northeast of central Beijing, has the greatest flow of passengers annually and is the second busiest in the world.

Shanghai has the 2nd largest amount of air traffic in China through its two airports combined, the Shanghai Pudong International Airport (PVG), which is located 30 km (19 mi) southeast of central Shanghai, and Shanghai Hongqiao International Airport (SHA), which is located 13 km (8 mi) west of central Shanghai. Both are under control of the Shanghai Airport Authority.

The new Guangzhou Baiyun International Airport (CAN), which opened in August 2004 and is located 28 km (17 mi) from downtown Guangzhou.

Other major airports are located at Hong Kong, Chengdu, Chongqing, Dalian, Hangzhou, Harbin, Hohhot, Kunming, Qingdao, Shenyang, Tianjin, Urumqi, Xiamen, and Xi'an.

China is served both by numerous major international flights to most countries of the world and a host of domestic regional airlines. Air traffic within mainland China is often connected through Beijing, Shanghai or Guangzhou. They are, respectively, the main hubs for Air China, China Eastern Airlines and China Southern Airlines. In 2003 China's civil aviation sector carried nearly 2.2 million tons of freight and 126.3 trillion passenger/kilometers.

Passenger flights to Taiwan and other places under administration of the Republic of China must follow special rules. Flights between mainland China and Hong Kong International Airport (HKG) and Macao International Airport (MFM) are considered international.

China, however, is planning to build a new airport in Nagqu, Tibet in 2011. It will surpass Qamdo Bangda Airport as being the world's highest airport once completed.

==== Airports with paved runways ====
- Total: 403
- Over 3,047 m: 58
- 2,438 to 3,047 m: 128
- 1,524 to 2,437 m: 130
- 914 to 1,523 m: 20
- Under 914 m: 67 (2007)

==== Airports with unpaved runways ====
- Total: 64
- Over 3,047 m: 4
- 2,438 to 3,047 m: 4
- 1,524 to 2,437 m: 13
- 914 to 1,523 m: 17
- Under 914 m: 26 (2007)

== Ports and shipping ==
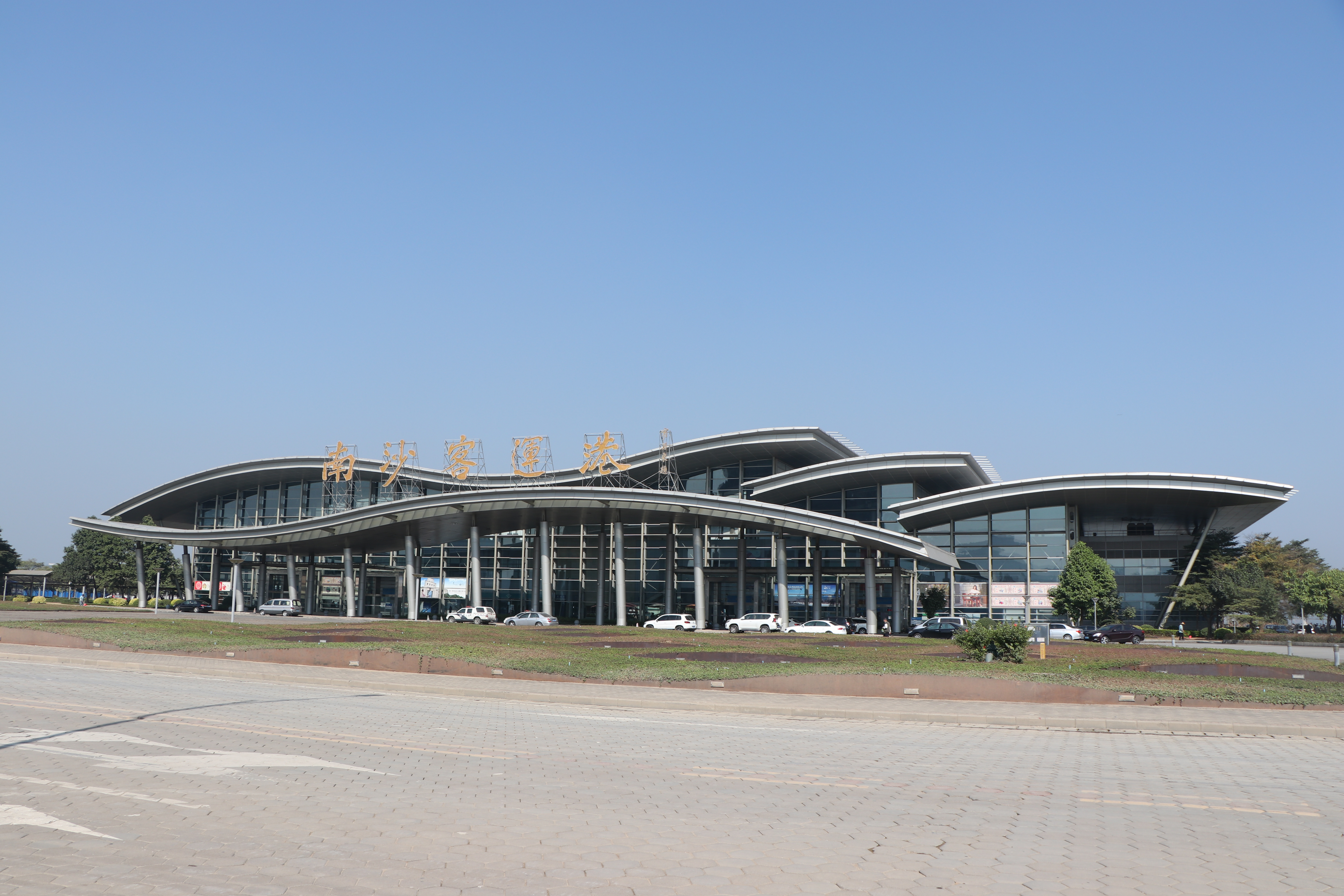
Nansha Passenger Port in Nansha District, Guangzhou

China has more than 2,000 ports, 130 of which are open to foreign ships. The major ports, including river ports accessible by ocean-going ships, are Beihai, Dalian, Dandong, Fuzhou, Guangzhou, Haikou, Hankou, Huangpu, Jiujiang, Lianyungang, Nanjing, Nantong, Ningbo, Qingdao, Qinhuangdao, Rizhao, Sanya, Shanghai, Shantou, Shenzhen, Tianjin, Weihai, Wenzhou, Xiamen, Yangzhou, Yantai, and Zhanjiang.

China has sixteen "major" shipping ports with a capacity of over 50 million tons per year. Combined China's total shipping capacity is in excess of 2,890 million tons. By 2010, 35% of the world's shipping is expected to originate from China. The seven largest port terminals are Dalian, Guangzhou, Nanjing, Ningbo, Qingdao, Qinhuangdao, Shanghai. Additionally, Hong Kong is a major international port serving as an important trade center for China. In 2005 Shanghai Port Management Department reported that its Shanghai port became the world's largest cargo port, processing cargo topping 443 million tons and surpassing Singapore's port. The Port of Shanghai is presently undergoing significant upgrades. Shanghai Model Port Alliance is responsible for many of the upgrades that are expected to make Shanghai's port more automated, minimizing the loss of goods and time while helping Customs collect more accurate tariffs. If the Shanghai project is successful, there is interest in replicating the process in other Chinese ports.

In 2003 China's major coastal ports handled 2.1 billion tons of freight.

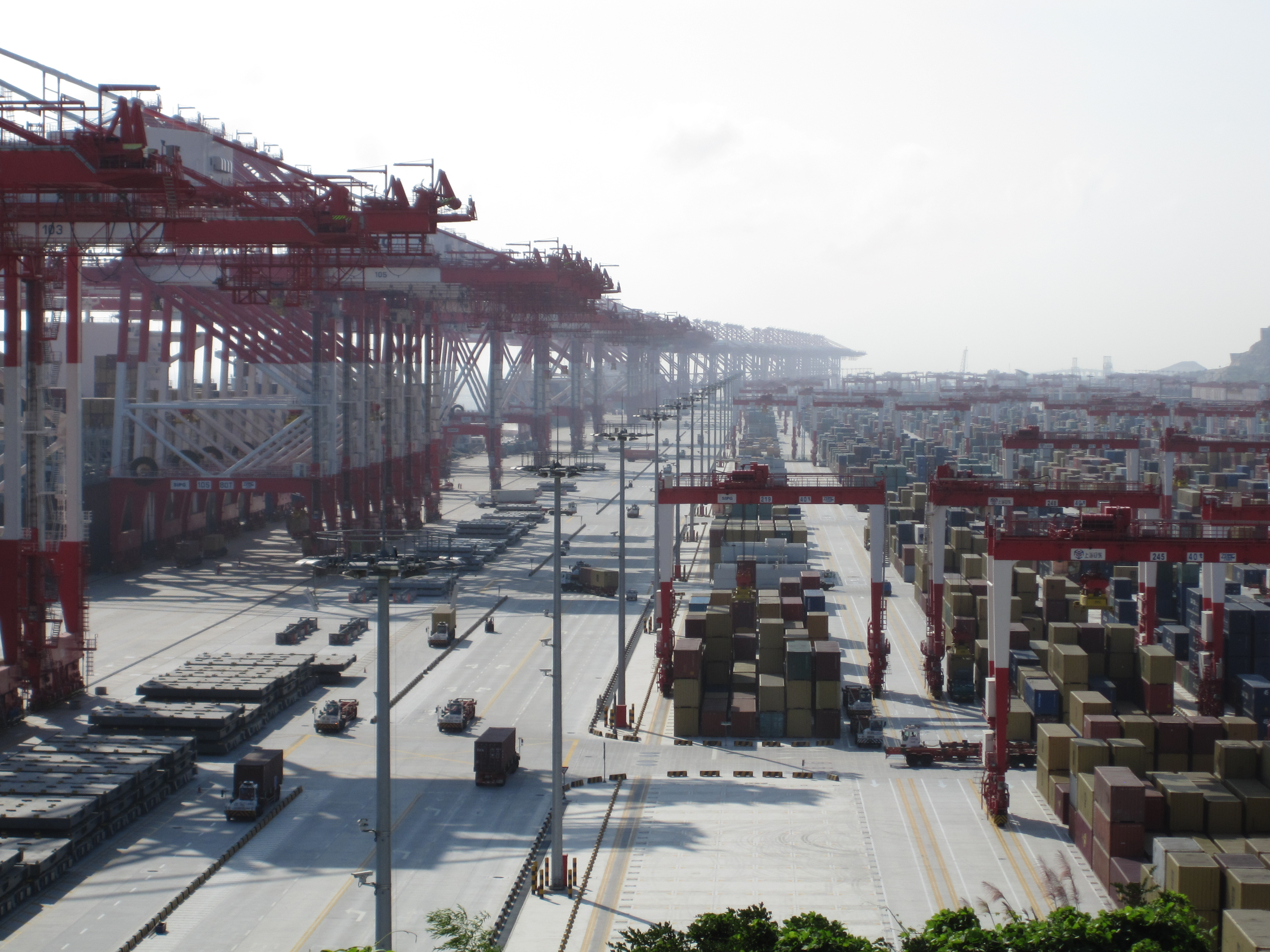
Yangshan Port off the coast in Shanghai

As of 2007, China's merchant fleet had 1,775 ships (1,000 GT or over) 22,219,786 GT/33,819,636 tonnes deadweight (DWT) by type: barge carrier 3, bulk carrier 415, cargo ship 689, carrier 3, chemical tanker 62, combination ore/oil 2, container ship 157, liquefied gas 35, passenger 8, passenger/cargo ship 84, oil tanker 250, refrigerated cargo ship 33, roll-on/roll-off 9, specialized tanker 8, vehicle carrier 17.

- foreign-owned: 12 (Ecuador 1, Greece 1, Hong Kong 6, Japan 2, South Korea 1, Norway 1) (2007)
- registered in other countries: 1,366 (Bahamas 9, Bangladesh 1, Belize 107, Bermuda 10, Bolivia 1, Cambodia 166, Cyprus 10, France 5, Georgia 4, Germany 2, Honduras 3, Hong Kong 309, India 1, Indonesia 2, Liberia 32, Malaysia 1, Malta 13, Marshall Islands 3, Mongolia 3, Norway 47, Panama 473, Philippines 2, Sierra Leone 8, Singapore 19, St Vincent and The Grenadines 106, Thailand 1, Turkey 1, Tuvalu 25, unknown 33) (2007)

Two important rail ferry crossings operate off the China coast. The Bohai Train Ferry allows freight trains to shortcut from Liaoning to Shandong, while the Guangdong–Hainan Ferry (part of the Guangdong–Hainan Railway) connects Hainan Island with China's mainland. There are also passenger and vehicle ferry lines connecting China with South Korea and Japan, as well as with the R.O.C.-controlled Kinmen Island.

== Waterways ==
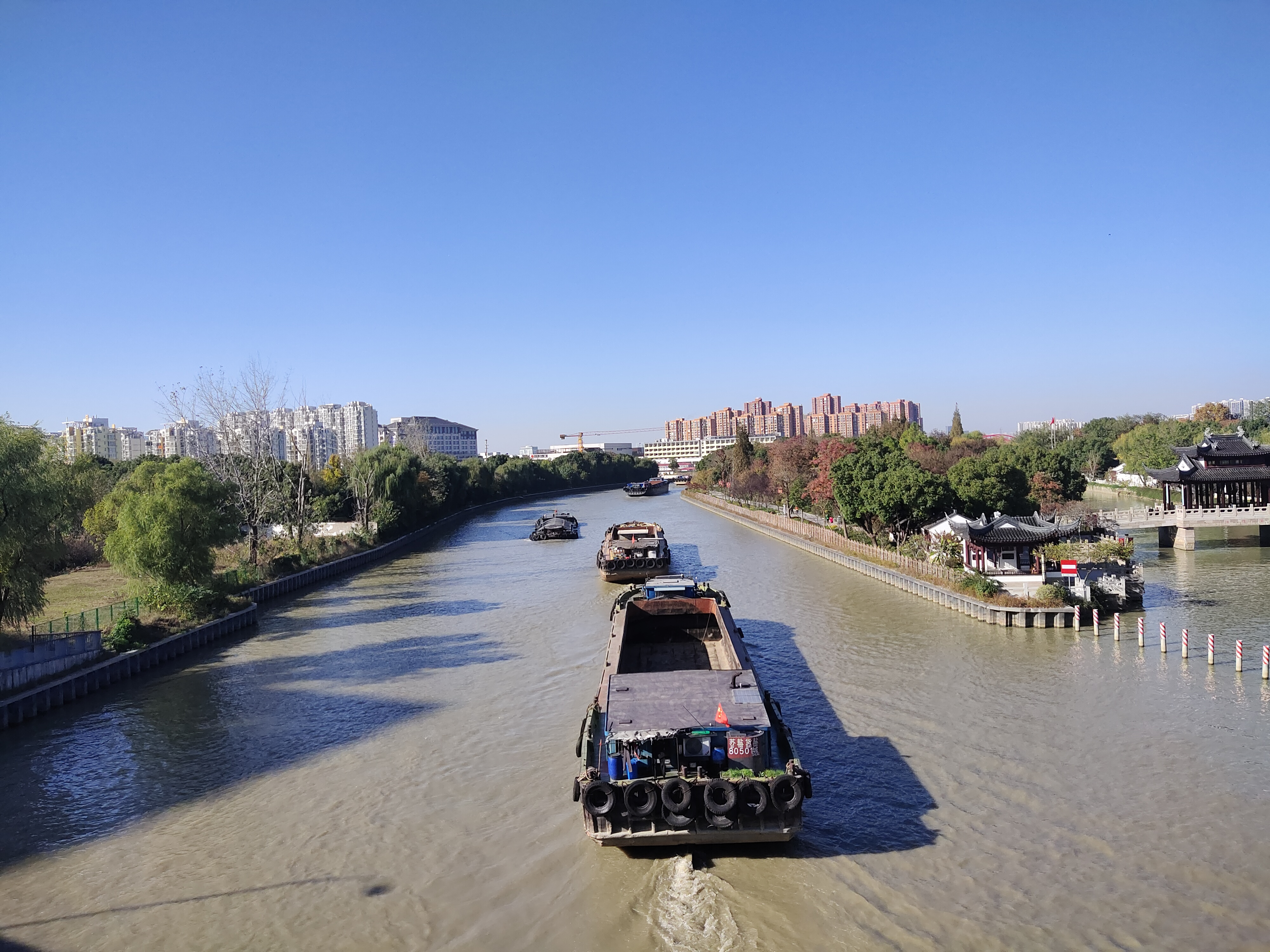
On the Grand Canal of China

China has 127,000 kilometers of navigable rivers, streams, lakes, and canals, more than any country in the world. In 2015, the traffic on the inland waterways has grown to 3.459 billion tonnes, cargo turnover to 1.331 trillion tkm. This is triple the volume since 2006. Passenger traffic is 271 million people and 7.308 billion person-km (2015), as reported by the 2015 Transportation Industry Statistical bulletin.

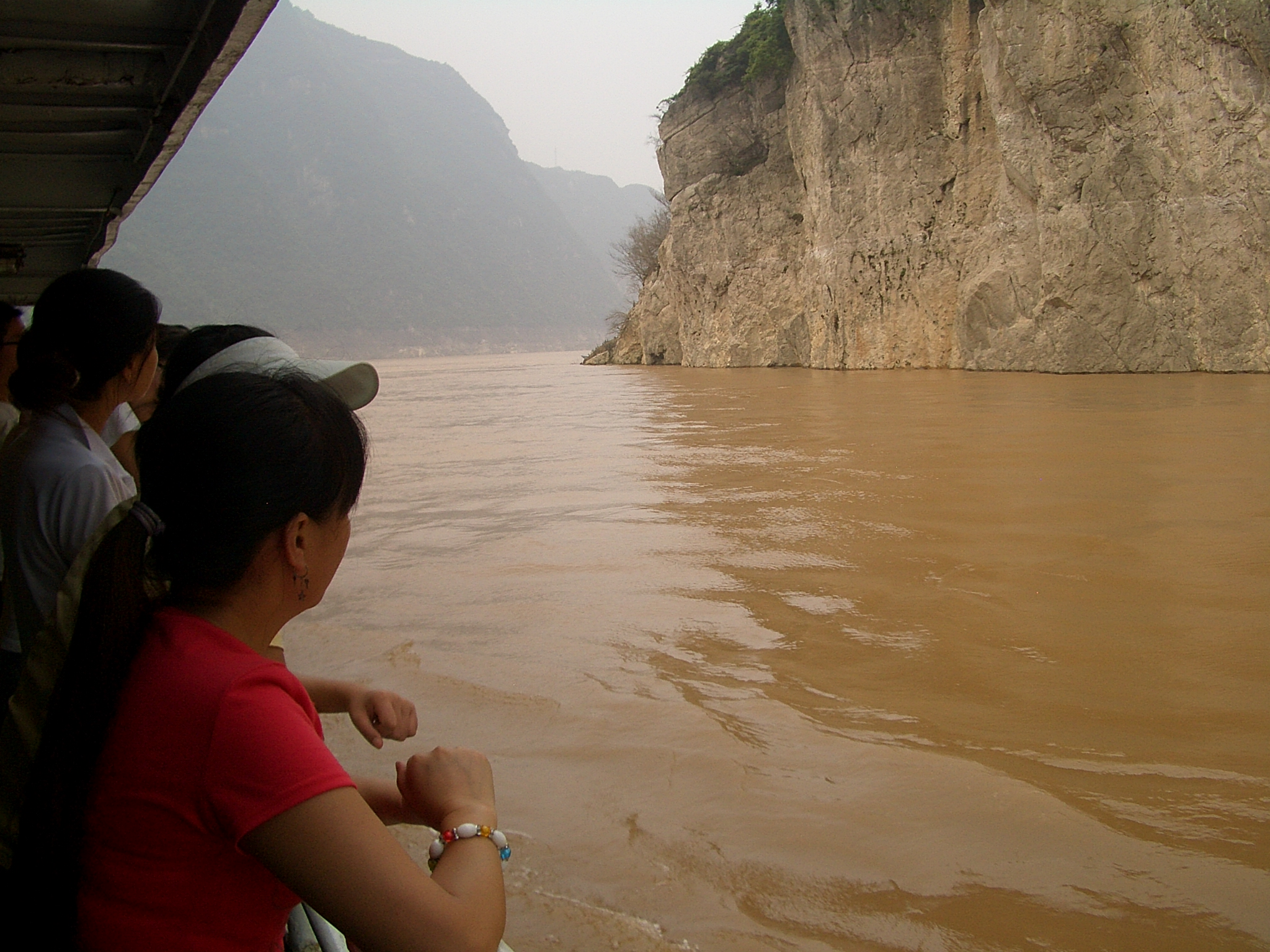
Traveling by boat allows passengers to enjoy the views of the Xiling Gorge in western Hubei.

The main navigable rivers are the Heilong Jiang; Yangtze River; Xiang River, a short branch of the Yangtze; Pearl River; Huangpu River; Lijiang River; and Xi Jiang.

Ships of up to 10,000 tons can navigate more than 1,000 km (621 mi) on the Yangtze as far as Wuhan. Ships of 1,000 tons can navigate from Wuhan to Chongqing, another 1,286 km (799 mi) upstream. The Grand Canal is the world's longest canal at 1,794 km (1,115 mi) with the southern portion serving a key role in barge transportation between Liangshan County south of the yellow river and Hangzhou. It links five major rivers: the Haihe, Huai River, Yellow River, Qiantang, and Yangtze.

Construction of new railways and highways has diminished the utility of China's rivers for passenger transport. Nonetheless, passenger boats are still popular in some mountainous regions, such as Western Hubei and Chongqing (the Three Gorges area), where railways are few and road access to many towns is inconvenient.

== Pipelines ==
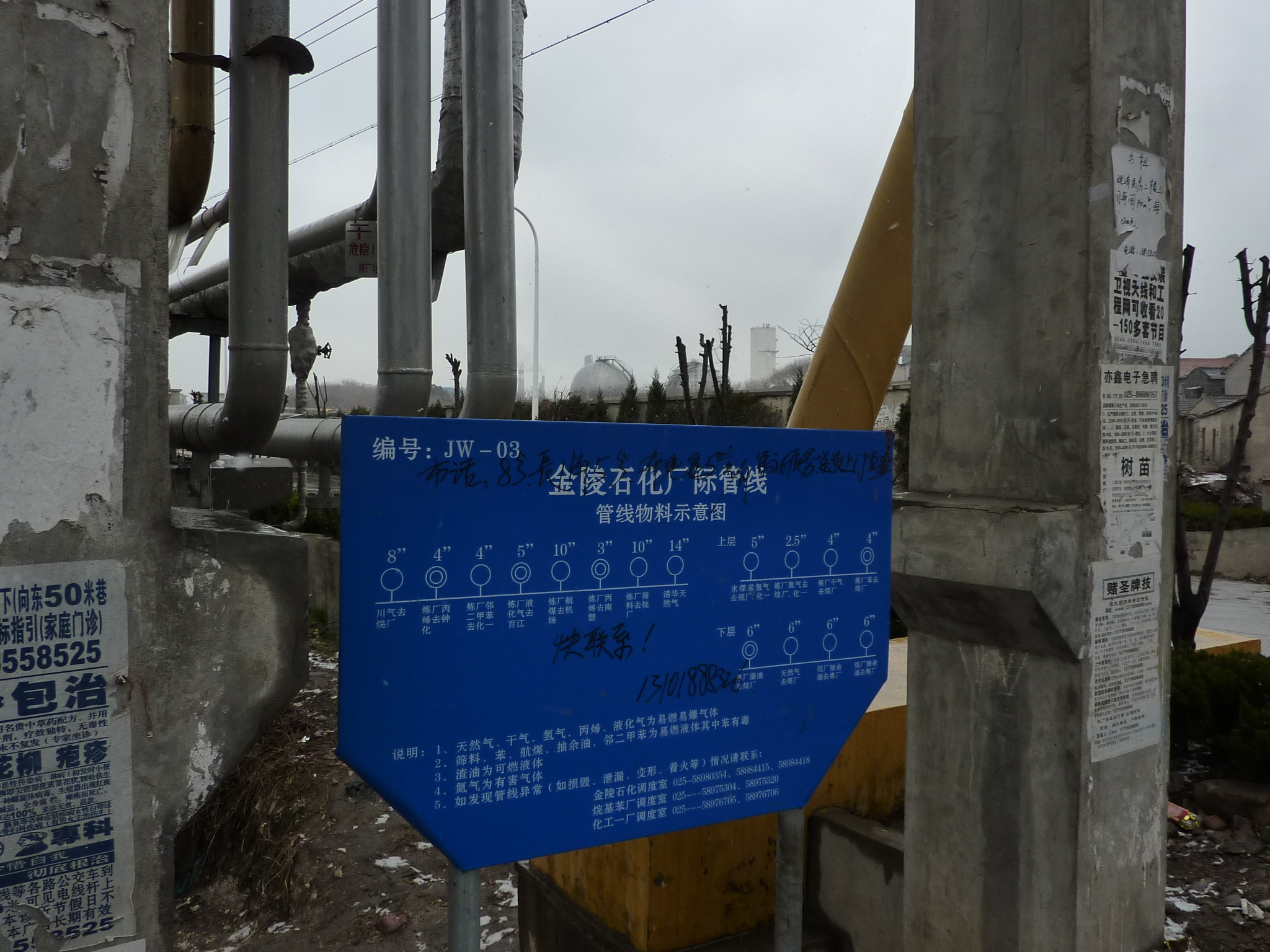
Pipelines near oil refineries in Ganjiaxiang, Qixia District, Nanjing

As of 2006, China had 22,664 km (14,083 mi) of gas pipelines, 15,256 km (9,480 mi) of oil pipelines, and 6,106 km (3,794 mi) for refined products. Due to the growing dependence on oil and gas, the total length of oil and gas pipelines in China has risen to 70,000 km (43,496 mi) from 22,000 km (13,670 mi) in 1997, stretching from oil and gas fields in western and northeastern regions to densely populated coastal areas in the east. By the end of 2010, the network could exceed 90,000 km (55,923 mi).

China's pipelines carried 219.9 million tons of petroleum and natural gas in 2003. As a major oil and gas consumer, China is searching for more external supplies. Construction of a 4,200 km-long pipeline from Xinjiang to Shanghai (West–East Gas Pipeline) was completed in 2004. The government hopes that the use of natural gas will assist to reduce the use of coal which is responsible for much air pollution.

== Economic benefits ==
Some economic experts have argued that the development gap between China and other emerging economies such as Brazil, Argentina and India can be attributed to a large extent to China's early focus on ambitious infrastructure projects, notably mass transport and transit related projects. While China invested roughly 9% of its GDP on infrastructure in the 1990s and 2000s, most emerging economies invested only 2% to 5% of their GDP. This considerable spending gap allowed the Chinese economy to grow at near optimal conditions while many South American economies suffered from various development bottlenecks (poor transportation networks, aging power grids, mediocre schools...).

== See also ==
- Electric vehicle industry in China
