= SAT Airlines =

Airline

| IATA | ICAO | Call sign |
|---|---|---|
| HZ | SHU | SATAIR |
- Founded: 1992
- Ceased operations: 2013 (merged into Aurora (airline))
- Hubs: Yuzhno-Sakhalinsk Airport
- Focus cities: Khabarovsk Novy Airport
- Fleet size: 18
- Destinations: 15
- Parent company: Aeroflot
- Headquarters: Yuzhno-Sakhalinsk, Russia
- Key people: Konstantin Petrovich Sukhorebrik (General Director)

OJSC "SAT Airlines — Sakhalinskie Aviatrassy" (Russian: Сахалинские Авиатрассы), commonly known as SAT Airlines, was an airline based in Sakhalin, Russia. It provided scheduled regional air services in Russia's Far East and to destinations in China, South Korea and Japan. Other services included charter flights, search and rescue operations, firefighting and aerial patrols. Its main base was Yuzhno-Sakhalinsk Airport.

The airline was amalgamated with Vladivostok Air to form new carrier Aurora in October 2013, with the new company retaining the airline designator codes of SAT Airlines.

== History ==
The Joint Stock Company, Sakhalinskie Aviatrassy — SAT Airlines was established as a result of the reorganisation of the Sakhalin United Detachment. It was established and started operations on 20 April 1992. Its sole owner was the Government of the Russian Federation. It employed 574 staff.

== Destinations ==
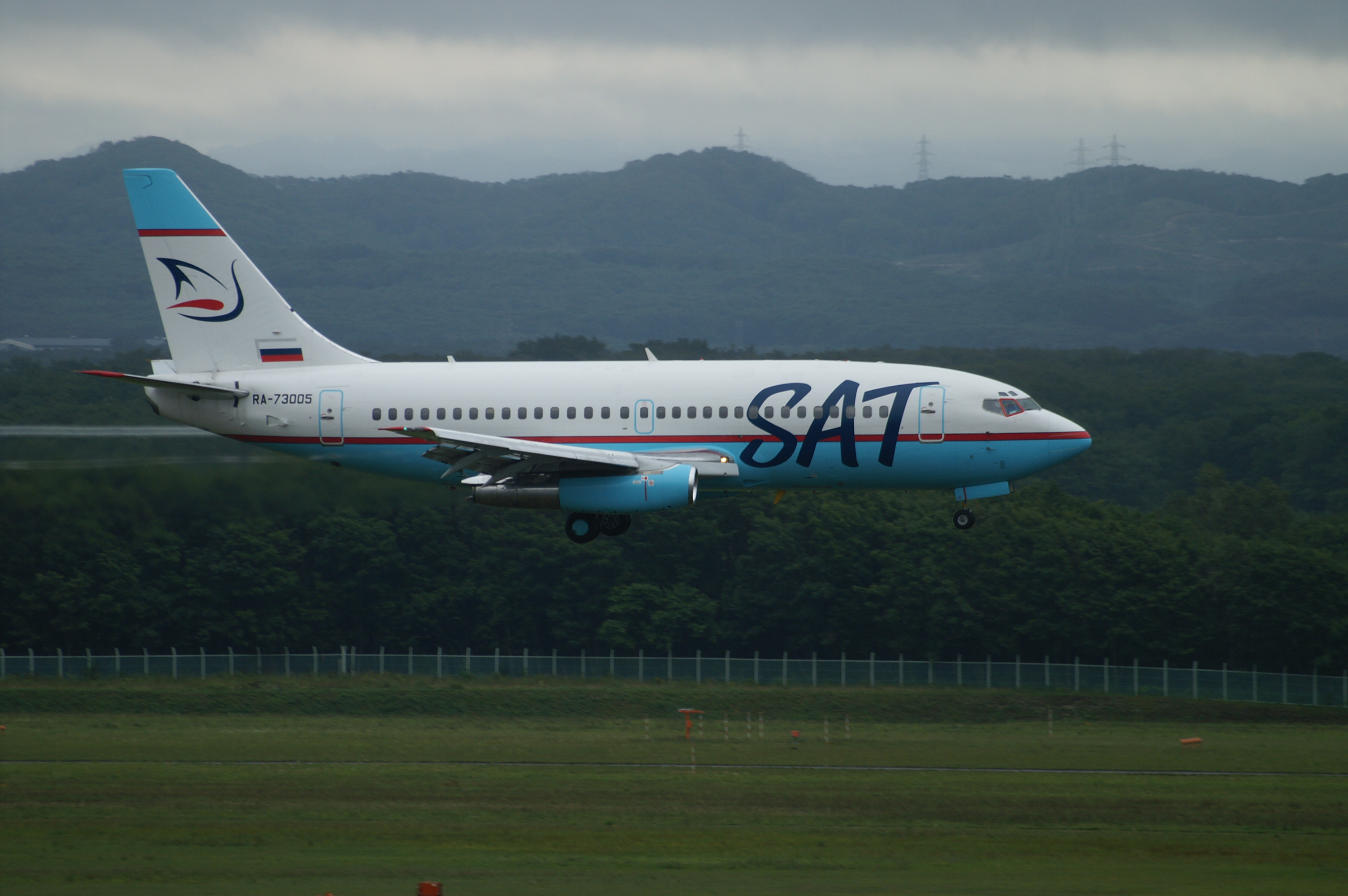
SAT Airlines Boeing 737-200 landing at New Chitose Airport, Japan (2006)

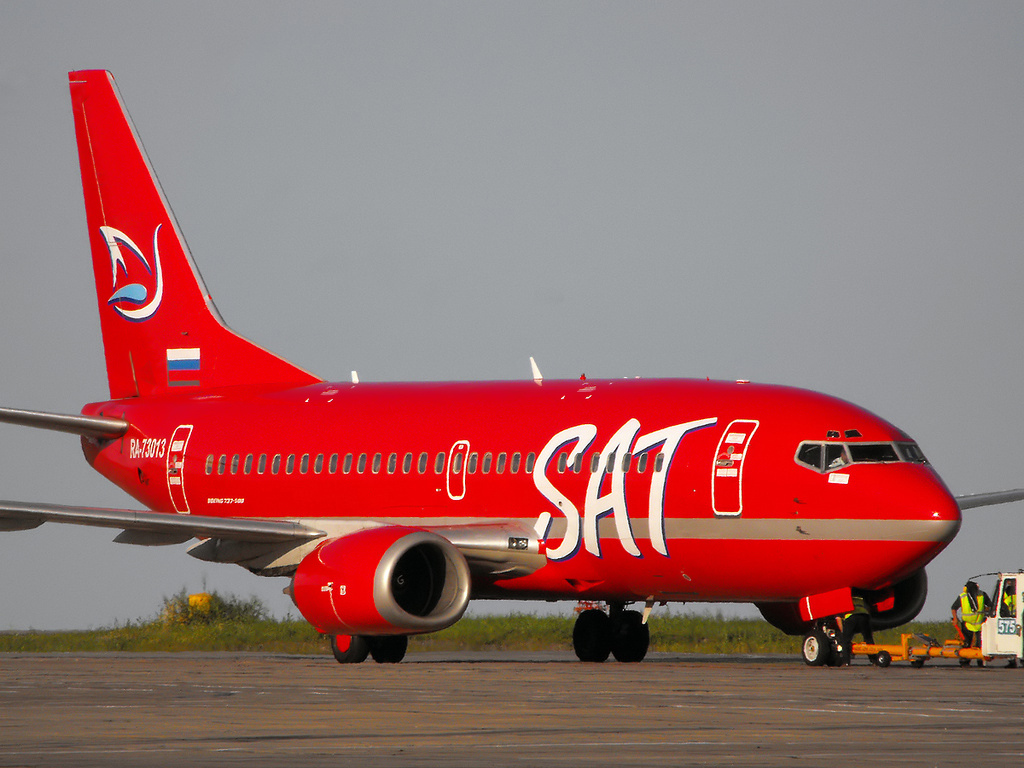
SAT Airlines Boeing 737-500

In October 2013, SAT Airlines operated flights to the following destinations:

China

- Harbin - Harbin Taiping International Airport
- Beijing - Beijing Capital International Airport

Japan

- Sapporo - New Chitose Airport

Russia

- Iturup Island - Burevestnik Airport
- Blagoveshchensk - Ignatyevo Airport
- Khabarovsk - Khabarovsk Novy Airport Focus City
- Petropavlovsk-Kamchatsky - Petropavlovsk-Kamchatsky Airport
- Okha - Okha Airport
- Vladivostok - Vladivostok International Airport
- Yuzhno-Kurilsk - Yuzhno-Kurilsk Airport
- Yuzhno-Sakhalinsk - Yuzhno-Sakhalinsk Airport Hub

South Korea

- Seoul - Incheon International Airport

== Fleet ==
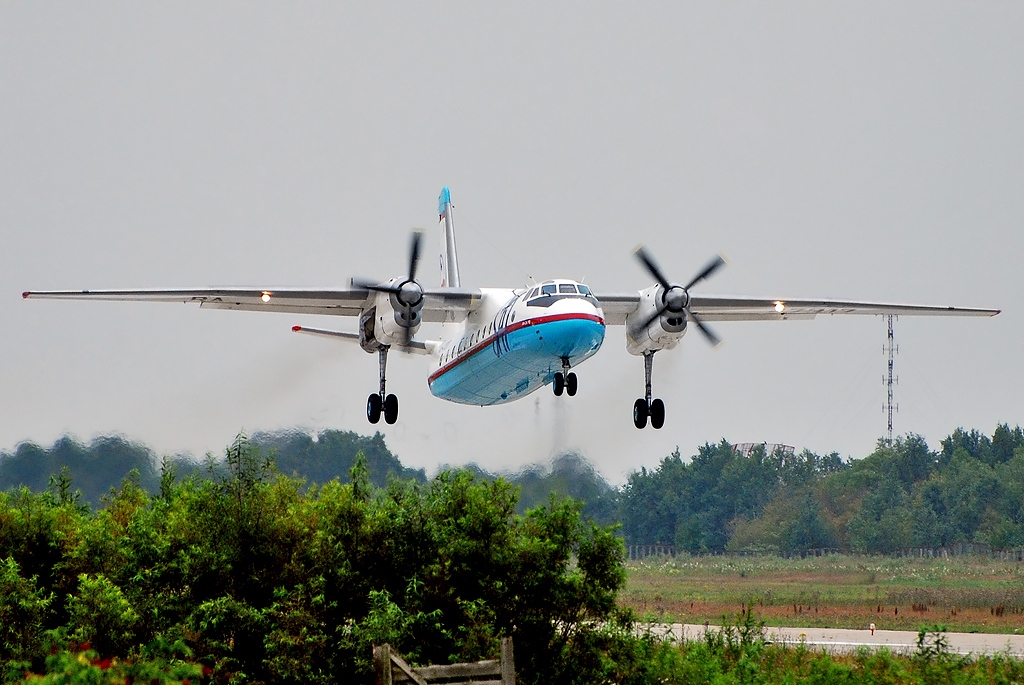
SAT Airlines Antonov An-24 taking off at Yuzhno-Sakhalinsk Airport

In October 2013, SAT Airlines' fleet consisted of the following aircraft:

SAT Airlines fleet
| Aircraft | In fleet | Passengers | | | Notes |
| Aircraft | In fleet | J | Y | Total | Notes |
|---|---|---|---|---|---|
| Antonov An-12 | 2 | Cargo | | | |
| Antonov An-24RV | 3 | — | 40 | 40 | |
| Boeing 737-200 | 2 | 8 | 101 | 109 | |
| Boeing 737-500 | 1 | 8 | 102 | 110 | |
| Bombardier Dash 8-200 | 2 | — | 37 | 37 | |
| Bombardier Dash 8-300 | 2 | — | 50 | 50 | |
| Ilyushin 62M | 1 | 12 | 156 | 168 | |
| Total | 13 | | | | |

== See also ==
- Aurora (airline)
- Defunct airlines of Russia
