= Dalavia =

Russian airline

Dalavia Авиакомпания «Дальавиа»
IATA	ICAO	Call sign
H8	KHB	DALAVIA
- Founded: 1953
- Ceased operations: 2008
- Hubs: Khabarovsk Novy Airport
- Fleet size: 40
- Destinations: 39 scheduled 4 charter
- Parent company: Government owned
- Headquarters: Khabarovsk, Russia
- Key people: Valery Borisovich Chichilimov (General Director)
- Website: http://www.dalaviadmd.ru

JSC Dalavia (Russian: ОАО «Дальавиа»), also known as Dalavia — Far Eastern Airways (Russian: Дальавиа «Дальневосточные Авиалинии») was an airline based in Khabarovsk, Russia. It operated scheduled and charter flights within Russia, and international flights to Asia. Its main base was Khabarovsk Novy Airport. The Russian Government suspended its traffic rights in October 2008.

== History ==
Khabarovsk's airport received its first concrete runway in August 1953, and in the same year Khabarovsk Aviation Enterprise (Russian: Хабаровское авиационное предприятие) was established as part of Aeroflot. Flights were initially operated by aircraft including the Polikarpov Po-2, Lisunov Li-2 and Ilyushin Il-14, and later the Tupolev Tu-154 and Ilyushin Il-62 were operated.

After the dissolution of the Soviet Union and the resultant breakup of Aeroflot, Khabarovsk Aviation Enterprise continued to operate under Aeroflot codes and in Aeroflot livery, in return for a licensing fee. On 29 March 1999, the airline began operations to Seoul in South Korea from Khabarovsk under its own codes, and with the new name of Dalavia. In December 1999 the airline started operating the route Khabarovsk-Bangkok-Singapore on a once-weekly basis.

The first Tu-214 was handed over to the airline at the KAPO plant in Kazan on 22 May 2001, in a ceremony presided over by Mintimer Shaimiyev, the President of Tatarstan.

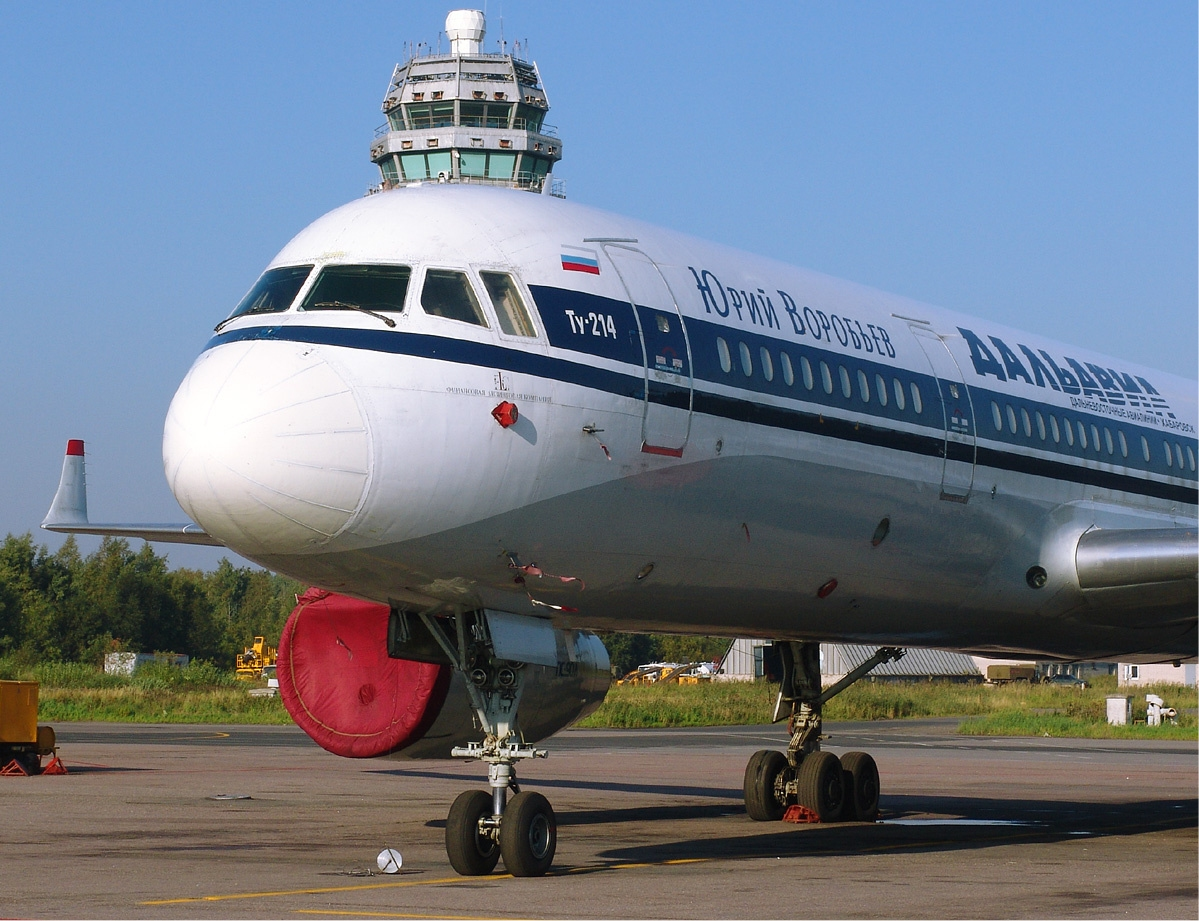
One of the airlines' Tupolev Tu-214s at Pulkovo Airport in Saint Petersburg in 2005.

Dalavia carried 621,405 passenger in 2004, an increase of 9.1% over the previous year. Of this, some 135,792 passengers were carried on the airline's international route network. This year the airline was given recognition as the best domestic airline in Russia in the Wings of Russia competition.

In December 2006, Dalavia signed a US$170 million deal with Sukhoi Civil Aircraft for the supply of six Sukhoi Superjet 100s, with options on an additional four airframes. From June 2007, the airline was to offer a weekly flight with Tupolev Tu-214 equipment from Anchorage, Alaska, to Petropavlovsk-Kamchatsky with a flight continuation to Khabarovsk.

On 26 January 2009, Rosaviatsiya cancelled the air operator's certificate of Dalavia. On 9 June 2009, the Arbitration Court of Khabarovsk Krai declared Dalavia bankrupt with debts almost twice the amount of its assets. Its accounts payables totalled some 1.7 billion rubles and wages for employees exceeded 350 million roubles. According to presidential decree, after the bankruptcy Dalavia was transferred to Russian Technologies when it was planned for Dalavia to enter the structure of Rosavia.

== Destinations ==
Dalavia operated scheduled and chartered flights to the following (as of December 2008):
Country	City	Airport	Notes
Domestic
Russia	Anadyr	Ugolny Airport	
	Barnaul	Barnaul Airport	
	Blagoveschensk	Ignatyevo Airport	
	Chelyabinsk	Chelyabinsk Balandino Airport	
	Chita	Kadala Airport	
	Irkutsk	Irkutsk Airport	
	Kazan	Kazan International Airport	
	Khabarovsk	Khabarovsk Novy Airport	Hub
	Komsomolsk-on-Amur	Komsomolsk-on-Amur Airport	
	Krasnodar	Krasnodar International Airport	
	Krasnoyarsk	Yemelyanovo Airport	
	Magadan	Sokol Airport	
	Moscow	Domodedovo International Airport	
	Novokuznetsk	Spichenkovo Airport	
	Novosibirsk	Tolmachevo Airport	
	Okha	Okha Airport	
	Okhotsk	Okhotsk Airport	
	Omsk	Tsentralny Airport	
	Petropavlovsk-Kamchatsky	Petropavlovsk-Kamchatsky Airport	
	Rostov-on-Don	Rostov-on-Don Airport	
	Saint Petersburg	Pulkovo Airport	
	Samara	Kurumoch International Airport	
	Shakhtersk	Shakhtyorsk Airport	
	Sochi	Sochi International Airport	
	Vladivostok	Vladivostok International Airport	
	Yekaterinburg	Koltsovo Airport	
	Yuzhno-Sakhalinsk	Yuzhno-Sakhalinsk Airport	
	Ulan-Ude	Ulan-Ude Airport	
	Tymovskoye	Zonalnoye Airport	
East Asia
Japan	Aomori	Aomori Airport	
	Niigata	Niigata Airport	
People's Republic of China	Beijing	Beijing Capital International Airport	
	Dalian	Dalian Zhoushuizi International Airport	
	Guangzhou	Guangzhou Baiyun International Airport	
	Harbin	Harbin Taiping International Airport	
	Qingdao	Qingdao Liuting International Airport	Charter
South Korea	Seoul	Incheon International Airport	
South-East Asia
Thailand	Bangkok	Suvarnabhumi Airport	Charter
Vietnam	Ho Chi Minh City	Tan Son Nhat International Airport	Occasionally
Central Asia
Azerbaijan	Baku	Heydar Aliyev International Airport	
Uzbekistan	Tashkent	Tashkent International Airport	
Middle East
Israel	Tel Aviv	Ben Gurion International Airport	Charter
Pacific
Northern Mariana Islands	Saipan	Saipan International Airport	Charter
North America
United States	Anchorage	Ted Stevens Anchorage International Airport	
Europe
Ukraine	Kyiv	Kyiv International Airport	

== Fleet ==
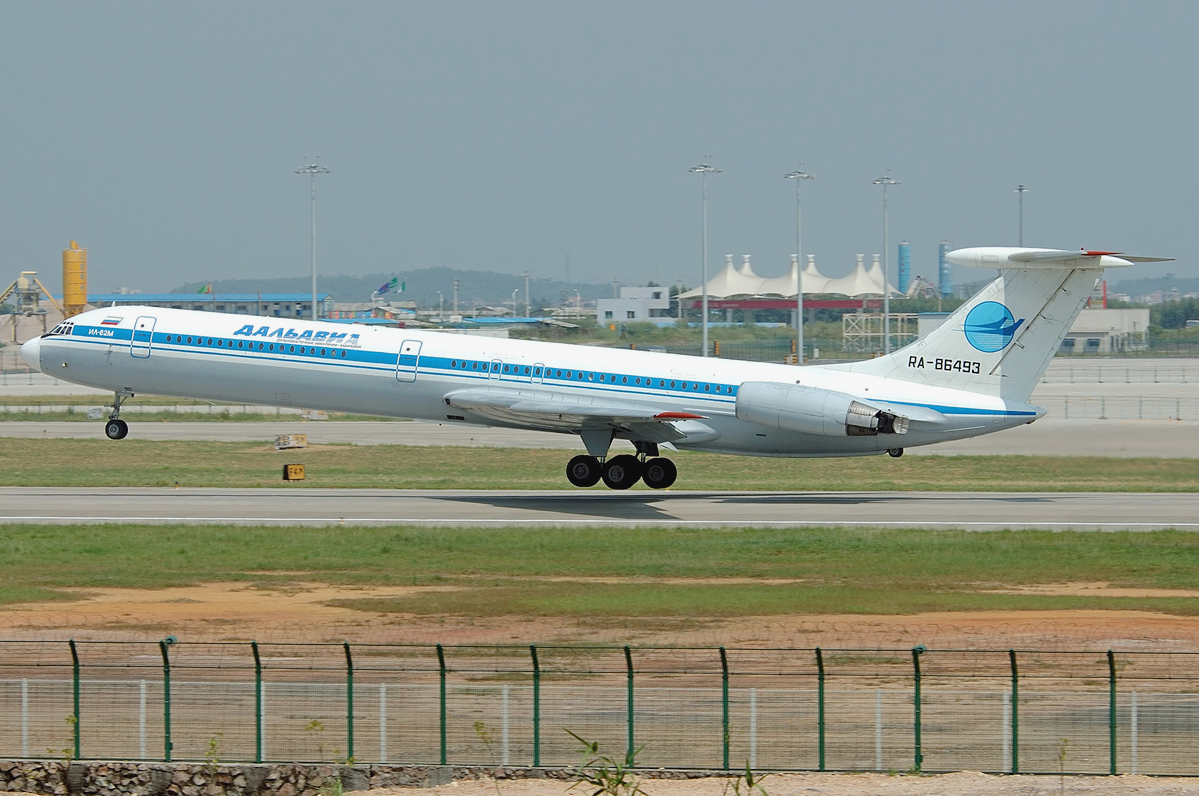
A Dalavia Ilyushin Il-62M takes off from Guangzhou Baiyun International Airport in 2006.

The Dalavia fleet included the following aircraft (at May 2008):

Dalavia Fleet
Aircraft	Total	Orders
Antonov An-24	6	0
Antonov An-26	4	0
Ilyushin Il-62	6	0
Sukhoi Superjet 100	0	6
Tupolev Tu-154	8	0
Tupolev Tu-214	5	0
Yakovlev Yak-40	1	0
Total	30	6
