= Vladivostok Air =

Russian airline

IATA	ICAO	Call sign
XF	VLK	VLADAIR
- Founded: 1932 (as Aeroflot); 1992 (independent)
- Ceased operations: 14 December 2013 (merged with SAT Airlines to form Aurora)
- Hubs: Vladivostok-Vladivostok International Airport; Khabarovsk-Novy International Airport; Moscow-Sheremetyevo International Airport
- Focus cities: Ekaterinburg Koltsovo Airport
- Frequent-flyer program: Leader Program
- Fleet size: 23 aircraft (+4 orders), 11 helicopters
- Destinations: 42
- Parent company: Aeroflot (52.1%)
- Headquarters: Vladivostok, Russia
- Key people: General Director: Vladimir Alexandrovich Saibel; Executive Vice Director: Igor Efimovich Bagelfer
- Website: http://www.vladivostokavia.ru/en

JSC Vladivostok Air (also Vladivostok Avia; Russian: ОАО Владивосток Авиа) (IATA: XF, ICAO: VLK) was an independent airline with its head office at the airport in Artyom, Primorski Krai, Russia. In 2011, it was reacquired by Aeroflot.

== Description ==
As the largest carrier in the Russian Far East and Siberia, Vladivostok Air operated scheduled domestic flights within Russia and international flights to Africa, Asia, and Europe, as well as charter flights and a well established helicopter service. The main hub of operations was Vladivostok International Airport, with secondary hubs at Moscow Sheremetyevo International Airport and Khabarovsk Novy International Airport and a focus city in Ekaterinburg Koltsovo Airport.

Prior to late September 2008, only a few flights between the cities of Vladivostok and Khabarovsk were available on Vladivostok Air, but when the Russian government decided to close Dalavia, due to high debt levels, Vladivostok Air soon announced the start of seven additional domestic routes and four new international routes from Khabarovsk.

== History ==
=== Beginnings ===
The 1930s saw active construction of airports in the Soviet republics throughout the USSR. The Primorye region gained its first airport in 1931. Construction also began on two airfields; a hydro-airport (seaplane port) in Vladivostok's Second River region and another named Ozernye Klyuchi (Lake Springs/Озерные Ключи), (which is now part of the current Vladivostok International Airport) near Artyom.

On 27 August 1932, a hydroplane (seaplane) destined to become the predecessor of Vladivostok Air completed its first flight and on 2 September, the hydroplane delivered four passengers from Khabarovsk to the Second River Airport marking. This is considered to be the official beginning of operations for Vladivostok Air, with regular flights from Khabarovsk to Vladivostok ever since.

In 1934, the Second River airport was moved to a dry location, allowing for the use of Polikarpov Po-2 aircraft, with which regular flights were made, and new airports also opened at Iman (now called Dalnerechensk) and Ozernye Klyuchi (Lake Springs) which, combined with newer aircraft, greatly fueled growth of the nascent airline.

=== World War II and the turboprop era ===
During World War II, Vladivostok Air's Po-2s carried supplies of lead-tin concentrates for industrial purposes and ammunition to the front lines. In July 1941, Vladivostok Air's fleet of Polikarpov U-2, Polikarpov P-5, and Shavrov Sh-2 aircraft were transferred to the Ozernye Klyuchi airport, opening a new era of development in the history of Primorye civil aviation and Vladivostok Air. Chemical, nautical, geological, and forest management applications followed after the end of the Great Patriotic War, operating from the rapidly developing airfields around the Primorye region. Many of which later served as the basis for modern airports constructed from the 1960s onwards.

Passenger flights from Vladivostok to Moscow began using Ilyushin Il-12 airliners in 1948. Five years later, in 1953, the Antonov An-2 commenced service, becoming a significant educational tool for Vladivostok Air, allowing pilots to amass experience in a number of different flight-related activities, while carrying several thousand passengers. Taking over the workload of the Po-2, the An-2 "Annushka" became a nearly irreplaceable aircraft for Vladivostok Air's agricultural charters. Vladivostok Air also began basic use of the Lisunov Li-2 aircraft, which would continue to operate regular passenger flights from Ozernye Klyuchi Airport to Khabarovsk for the next 15 years.

Vladivostok Air's robust helicopter operations began with the Mil Mi-1, Kamov Ka-15 and Mil Mi-4. These three helicopter types dutifully toiled away for some 30 odd-years and were later succeeded by the Mil Mi-8, Kamov Ka-26, and Kamov Ka-32.

=== Jet era and expansion ===
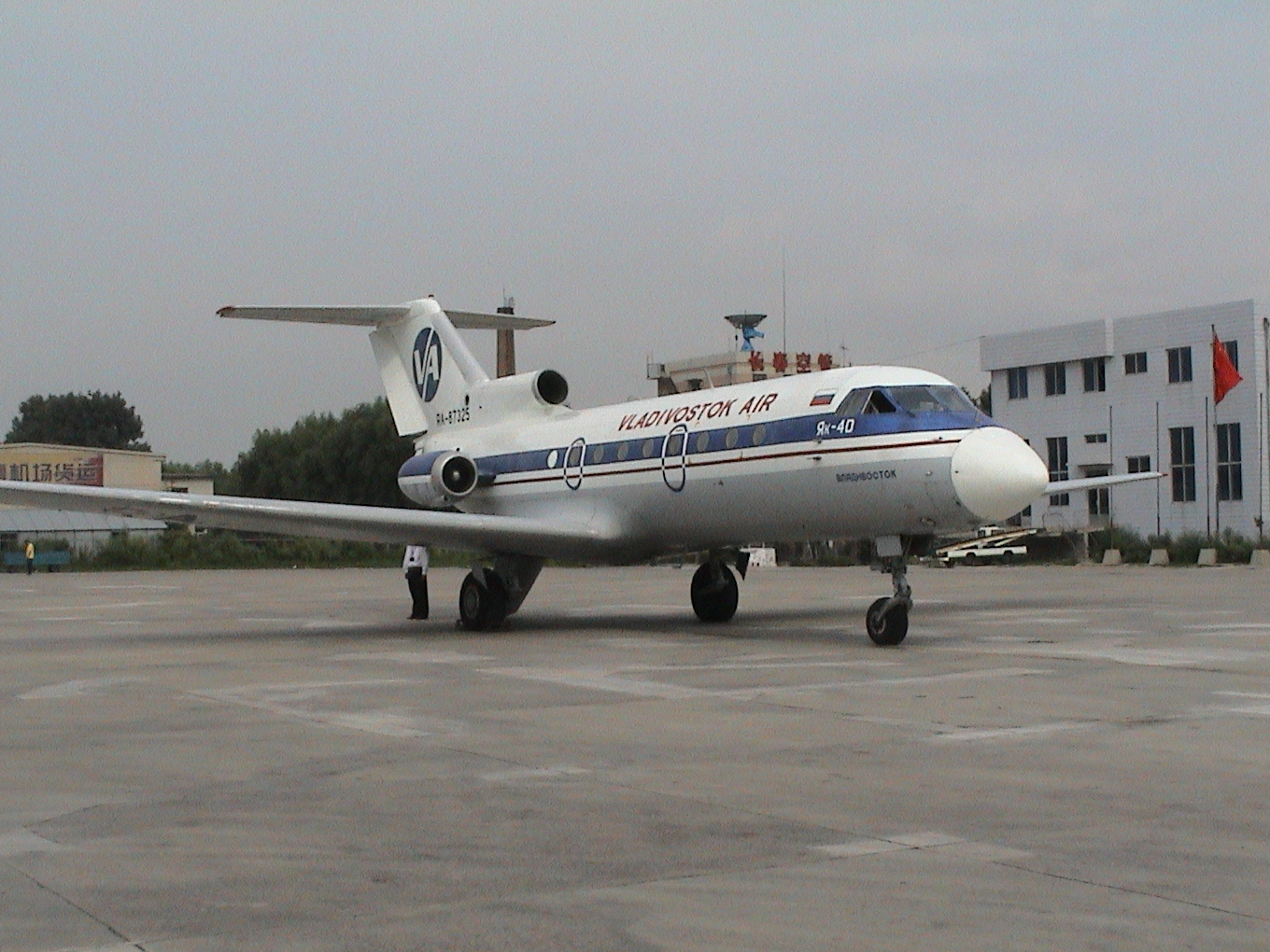
a Yak-40 of Vladivostok Air

By 1958, the beginnings of the Primorye region's passenger-jet era started with the introduction of the Tupolev Tu-104 airliner, and the Tupolev Tu-114D which completed the first trial, scheduled, non-stop flight from Moscow to Vladivostok (on Aeroflot) in May 1958. When the size of the Ozernye Klyuchi airport restricted Vladivostok Air's expansion, the ground facilities were improved to allow regular flights with Tu-104s (1958), Ilyushin Il-18s (1963), and Antonov An-10s (1964). These improvements to the airport sharply increased passenger volumes. The first brick built terminal opened in February 1961, facilitating the processing of up to 200 passengers at once, marking the beginning of the larger airport known as Vladivostok International Airport.

Between the 1960s and 1980s, pilots from Vladivostok Air became pioneers in servicing the region's various whaling and fishing towns. While with Mi-1 helicopters, on 30 August 1961, Vladivostok Air entered the fishing industry as well. Helicopters from Vladivostok Air have also served as flying-cranes and ambulances, further expanding their growing helicopter charter operations.

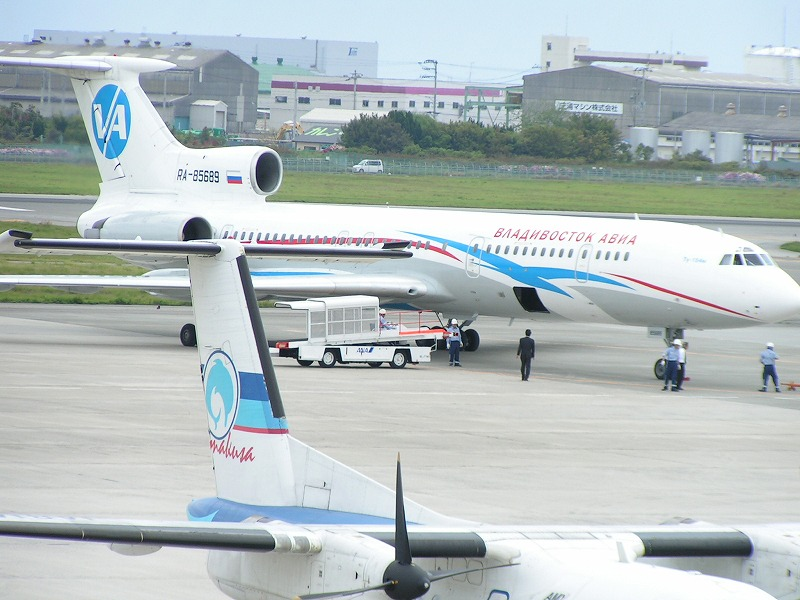
Tupolev Tu-154M of Vladivostok Air in Matsuyama, Japan

In 1973, construction started on a new terminal at Vladivostok International Airport which began operating at the end of 1976. With the increase in terminal capacity, Vladivostok Air soon began regular service with Tupolev Tu-154s, heralding a period of dynamic development of Vladivostok Air's fleet as new Yakovlev Yak-40s and Mil Mi-8s were purchased. The completion of a second runway in June 1985 opened up Vladivostok Airport to all modern aircraft and provided for the non-stop Aeroflot air service between Moscow and Vladivostok onboard Ilyushin Il-62 aircraft.

=== Post-Soviet era ===
In 1990, after having signed an agreement in Papua New Guinea for the use of Ka-32 helicopters, Vladivostok Air entered the international arena. Following the collapse of the Soviet Union in 1992, Vladivostok opened to international flights, fueling rapid expansion at Vladivostok Air. During this time period, two Ilyushin Il-76 cargo aircraft in addition to several Tupolev Tu-154B-2 aircraft were purchased for use on international routes.

Beginning in 1994, Vladivostok Air was an openly traded stock company, "Vladivostok Air", whose holdings at the time included the airline and Vladivostok International Airport. By 1995, the first long-distance Tupolev Tu-154M aircraft were purchased.

On 4 March 1999, the renovated international terminal at Vladivostok International Airport was put into operation, allowing for additional flights to Asia and North America.

=== 2000 – 2014 ===
In 2004, Vladivostok Air passed the IATA Operational Safety Audit, becoming a full International Air Transport Association member leading to recognition of Vladivostok Air as a safe and reliable airline.

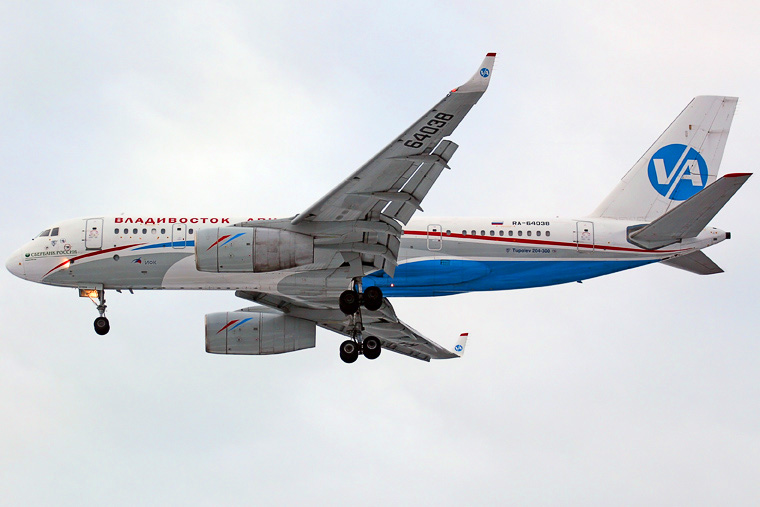
Tu-204-300 of Vladivostok Air landing in Moscow-Vnukovo

In 2005, Vladivostok Air was the first airline in the world to operate the new Tupolev Tu-204-300 aircraft, a fleet of six was purchased.

The large-scale reconstruction of Vladivostok International Airport's domestic terminal was completed in December 2006, increasing passenger comfort, capacity, and growth.

With the help of the ILFC, Vladivostok Air leased an Airbus A-320 on 5 February 2007. It was the first foreign-made aircraft in the Russian Far East; Vladivostok Air flew up to 7 of them.

JSC Vladivostok International Airport was separated from Vladivostok Air on 15 February 2008; Vladivostok International Airport was then included in the Russian register of open joint stock companies. One of the most significant achievements of 2008 was the successful accreditation for compliance with IATA safety requirements (IOSA).

When Vladivostok Air celebrated its 15th anniversary as an open joint stock company on 20 January 2009, it had transformed from a regional carrier into the largest company in the Russian Far East and East Siberia. Passenger numbers increased to over 900,000 annually because of fleet expansion and modernisation. June 2009 saw the introduction of the first long-haul Airbus A330-300 service, connecting Vladivostok and Moscow, with more A320s and A330s expected to join the fleet between October 2009 and the summer of 2010. Orders for four Antonov An-148 with two options were placed at the 2009 MAKS Airshow.

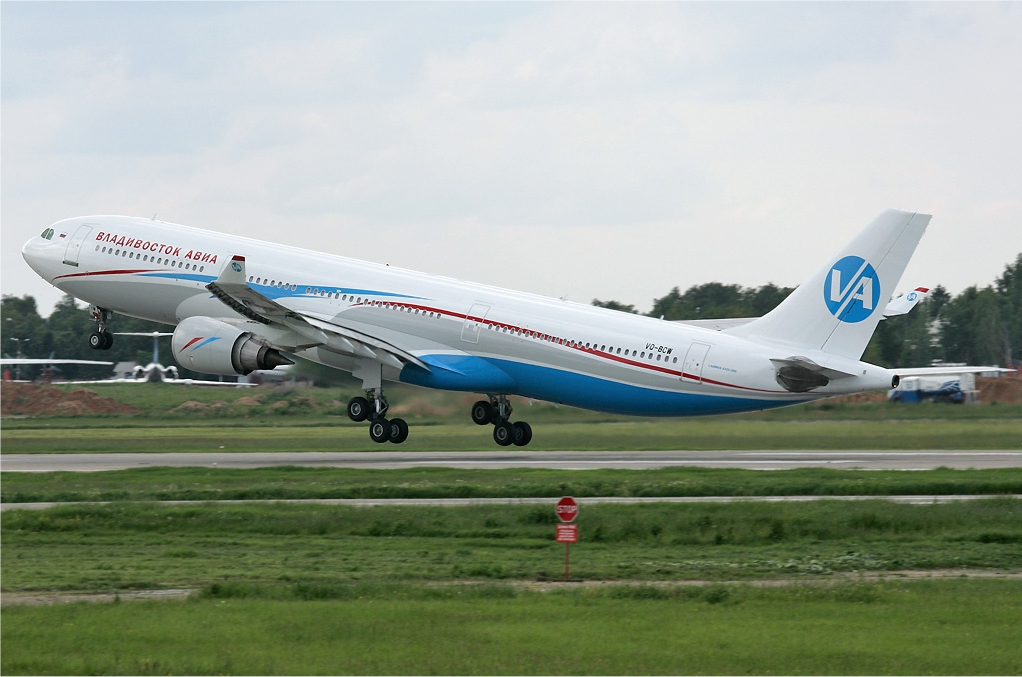
A330-300 of Vladivostok Air

On 28 April 2009, Vladivostok Air received the Wings of Russia 2008 award in the category of "Airline of the Year — Passengers Choice". Vladivostok Air also announced its earnings on 15 July, showing that, despite the recession, passenger traffic had increased by an incredible 36.6%, while passenger capacity was 28.8% higher in the first six months of 2009 than in the first six months of 2008, with the load factor increasing by 9.5%. Vladivostok Air's income was an astounding 38.1% higher for the same period of time in 2009 than in 2008, attributed to fleet network optimization, transition to more fuel efficient aircraft, and to the takeover of Dalavia's Khabarovsk hub.

On 17 July 2009, Vladivostok Air introduced its new online sales system, with the new reservation system allowing purchases with all major credit cards. In addition to the new sales system, passengers were offered three economy fares and one business class fare including "Promo", "Eco", "Eco +" and "Business". "Promo" was the cheapest fare selection, with the bare minimum amenities, while the "Business" fare was the most expensive, with access to all business class amenities.

Vladivostok Air received an additional A320 aircraft on 12 August 2010, bringing the total amount in its fleet to seven. On 18 August, an interline agreement was signed with United Airlines. On 19–20 August, Vladivostok Air successfully passed its second IOSA audit, further maintaining its IATA membership.

Aeroflot acquired a majority stake in Vladivostok Air in November 2011, intending to convert Vladivostok Air into a Far Eastern regional airline and to eliminate its long-haul flights.

Vladivostok Air ended operations on 14 December 2013; along with SAT Airlines, it became the new airline Aurora. The airline's AOC was revoked by Rosaviatsia in August 2014.

=== Aeroflot ===
Before the 2011 acquisition, Vladivostok Airlines was a non-alliance affiliate of Aeroflot, amplifying Aeroflot's network from Moscow-Sheremetyevo and Vladivostok.

=== Codeshare agreements ===
Vladivostok Airlines had one codeshare and multiple interline agreements with the following airlines in August 2010. Airlines marked with a * indicate interline agreements:

- Aeroflot* (SkyTeam) as an affiliate airline
- Air China* (Star Alliance)
- Asiana Airlines* (Star Alliance)
- Hainan Airlines*
- Korean Air* (SkyTeam)
- Thai Airways International* (Star Alliance)
- United Airlines* (Star Alliance)
- Vietnam Airlines* (SkyTeam)

== Fleet ==
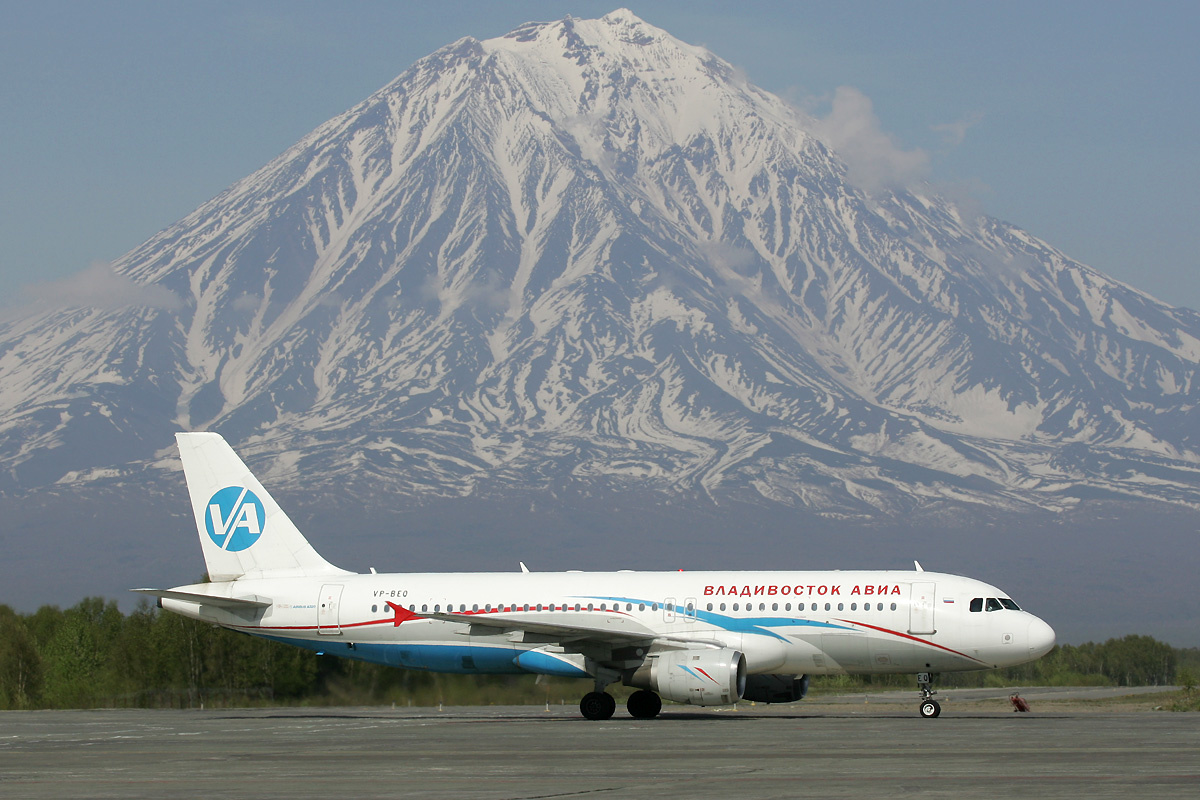
Vladivostok Air Airbus A320-200 at Yelizovo Airport in 2011

The Vladivostok Air fleet consisted of the following aircraft:

Vladivostok Air Fleet
Aircraft	Total	Orders	Passengers			Notes
Aircraft	Total	Orders	J	Y	Total	Notes
Airbus A320-200	6	—	12	138	150	
Antonov An-148	4	—	TBA			Replacement of Yak-40.
Mil Mi-8	11	—	16	—	16	
Mil Mi-8	11	—	—	21	21	
Mil Mi-8	11	—	—	28	28	
Mil Mi-8	11	—	—	32	32	
Yakovlev Yak-40	9	—	—	32	32	Replaced by Antonov An-148's.
Total	26	—				

The airline took delivery of its first A320 in November 2006 under a lease agreement with the ILFC. Since the arrival of the first A320, six more have arrived, with the latest delivered in August 2010.

On 6 January 2009, ILFC announced the airline's lease of three used Airbus A330-300 aircraft. The first aircraft was delivered in May 2009, after coming off lease from Aer Lingus. The lease term was for 7 years. The aircraft entered service on 9 June 2009, flying between Vladivostok and Moscow. The A330 seated 327 people and was mainly used to fly between Vladivostok/Khabarovsk and Moscow. The second A330 was delivered in October 2009, while the third arrived in March 2010.

With an influx of more modern aircraft, like the A320 and Tu-204, Vladivostok Air shifted all remaining Tu-154 aircraft into its reserve and charter fleet.

During MAKS Airshow 2009, Vladivostok Air signed a precontractual agreement to buy four Antonov An-148, with options for two more. These regional jets' capacity was 68–85 passengers and they replaced the four aging Yak-40 aircraft. The aircraft were expected to be delivered between 2012 and 2014.

== Incidents and accidents ==
In July 2001, Vladivostok Air Flight 352, a Tupolev Tu-154 belonging to Vladivostok Air crashed while attempting to land in Irkutsk, Russia, killing all 145 people aboard. A Russian official said that 12 Chinese died on the flight.
