= Iturup Airport =

Airport in Iturup Island

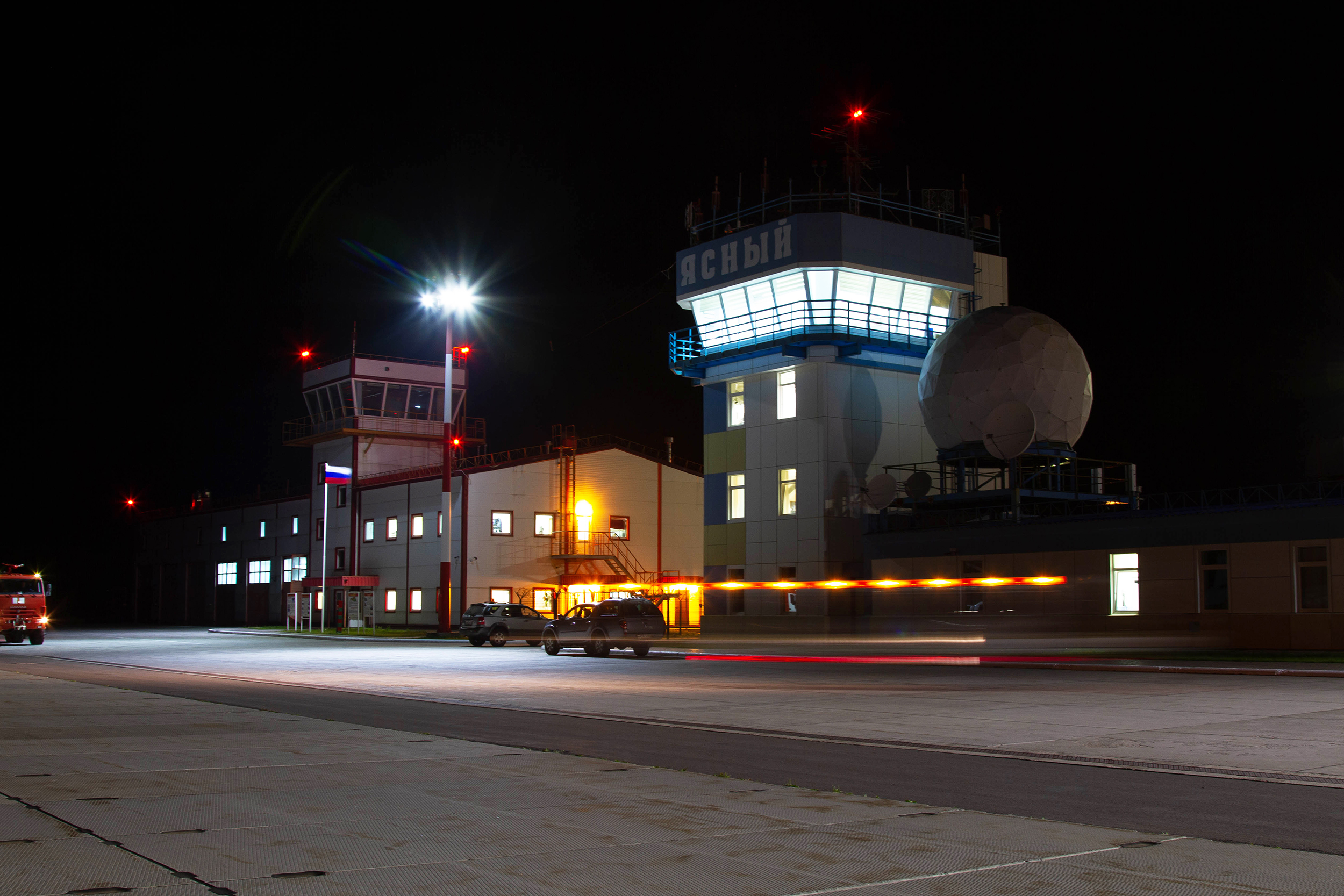
- IATA: ITU; ICAO: UHSI; LID: ККУ

Summary
- Airport type: Public
- Operator: Kuril Islands Airports (Аэропорты Курильских островов)
- Serves: Kurilsk, Iturup Island
- Elevation AMSL: 387 ft (118 m)
- Coordinates: 45°15′23″N 147°57′21″E

Map
- Location of airport in Sakhalin Oblast ITU (Japan)

Runways
Direction	Length		Surface
Direction	m	ft	Surface
13/31	2,300	7,546	Concrete

Iturup Airport (Russian: Аэропорт Итуруп; Japanese: ヤースヌイ空港) (IATA: ITU, ICAO: UHSI) is an airport on Iturup Island in the Kuril Islands, which is under Russian administration but claimed by Japan. It is located 7 km (4.3 mi) northeast of the town of Kurilsk.

== History ==
The airport has been in commercial operation since 22 September 2014. It has been built in a swampy taiga and is the first airport built from scratch in Russia's post-Soviet history. In 2018, Iturup became a joint civil-military airport with the stationing there of a flight of Su-35S fighters from the 23rd Fighter Aviation Regiment, designated Yasny air base.

Before Iturup Airport was built, Burevestnik Military Air Base, located 40 km southwest from the town center (or 60 km by road), had been the only airport serving Kurilsk. Now, it becomes a reserve airfield for Iturup. Because it is often closed due to fog, the new Iturup Airport improves air traffic punctuality.

== Facilities ==
The airport's only runway (marked 13/31) is 2,300 by 42 metres (7,546 ft × 138 ft) and has a concrete surface, equipped with an Instrument Landing System and glideslope which facilitate Instrument Flight Rules landings.

== Airlines and destinations ==
Airlines	Destinations
Aurora	Vladivostok, Yuzhno-Sakhalinsk

== See also ==
- List of airports in Russia
