= Burevestnik Airport =

Military air base on Itrup, Kuril Islands

Burevestnik
- Буревестник
- Burevestnik, Sakhalin Oblast in Russia
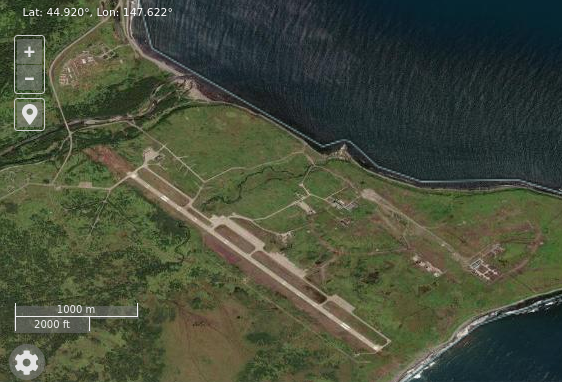
- Satellite imagery of Burevestnik air base

Site information
- Type: Air Base
- Owner: Ministry of Defence
- Operator: Russian Aerospace Forces
- Controlled by: 11th Air and Air Defence Forces Army

Location
- Shown within Sakhalin Oblast Burevestnik (Japan)
- Coordinates: 44°55′12″N 147°37′18″E

Site history
- Built: 1941
- In use: 1941 - present

Airfield information
- Identifiers: IATA: BVV, ICAO: UHSB, LID: БУР
- Elevation: 24 metres (79 ft) AMSL
Runways
Direction	Length and surface
14/32	2,380 metres (7,808 ft) Concrete

Burevestnik (also Iturup; Japanese: 天寧飛行場, Tennei-hikōjō) (IATA: BVV, ICAO: UHSB) is a military air base on Iturup Island, Russia, establishing Soviet/Russian presence on the disputed South Kuril Islands with the largest airfield in the region. It is also the former Soviet Union's most remote interceptor base. An Army helicopter combat support squadron was also stationed at the airfield in the early 1980s, providing limited fire support and transport capability. Burevestnik's communications and logistics were tied to Yuzhno-Sakhalinsk and supplies were flown in weekly on Antonov An-12 aircraft.

The base is home to a detachment of the 18th Army Aviation Brigade which flies the Mil Mi-8AMTSh under the 11th Air and Air Defence Forces Army.

== History ==
During World War II, Burevestnik was a Japanese airfield known as Tennei Airfield. After Soviet re-occupation, as many as 100 aircraft were observed at any given time from 1945 to 1952. By the early 1960s, Mikoyan-Gurevich MiG-15 and Mikoyan-Gurevich MiG-17 jet fighters from the 308th Fighter Aviation Regiment PVO (IAP) of the Soviet Air Defence Forces were based at the airfield. In 1965, the runway was lengthened from 1930 m (6350 ft) to approximately 2500 m (8200 ft). During the 1970s, it flew Mikoyan-Gurevich MiG-21bis.

Burevestnik's close proximity to Japan's highly populated Hokkaidō Island, by only 190 km, and to major aviation corridors kept the base in a state of constant alert. In 1968, an American Douglas DC-8 was forced to land here after straying off course in the Seaboard World Airlines Flight 253 incident. In April 1983, Burevestnik's MiG-21s were alerted due to a close approach of American Grumman F-14 Tomcat aircraft but did not take off due to bad weather.

The 41st Fighter Aviation Regiment PVO, flying MiG-23MLs (1983–90) and MiG-23MLDs (1990–1994), originally at Sovetskaya Gavan's Postavaya airfield, swapped with the 308th IAP in April 1983, under the control of 40 IAD (1983–86), 24th Air Defence Division (1986–90) and then finally 72nd Air Defence Corps (1990–94). In 1993 the PVO decided to withdraw its 40 MiG-23 aircraft at Burevestnik, and the 41st was disbanded in late 1994. The decision was said in the Russian press to come as good news to its pilots, as the failure of the MiG-23's single R-35 turbojet engine would be "the last failure in the pilot's life", and that a ship or submarine would come by three days after the accident at best. The Russian article also described Burevestnik as a bare-base facility, with no hangars, and aircraft "rusting year-round under the open sky".

On 17 September 2014, new Iturup Airport was opened 7 km (4.3 mi) northeast of the town of Kurilsk. After that Burevestnik Airport remains as a military base and a reserve airfield for Iturup.

Currently, the airfield is considered operational, and the aviation commandant’s office is operational.

== Airlines and destinations ==
There is no longer any passenger traffic scheduled after Aurora moved its Yuzhno-Sakhalinsk route to newly opened Iturup Airport.

== See also ==
- List of military airbases in Russia
