= Flight 352 =

Flight 352 may refer to:

Listed chronologically

- Braniff International Airways Flight 352, crashed on 3 May 1968
- Vladivostok Air Flight 352, crashed on 4 July 2001
- TNT Airways Flight 352, landed without its right main landing gear on 15 June 2006
