= Yuzhno-Kurilsk =

Urban-type settlement in Kuril Islands

Yuzhno-Kurilsk Южно-Курильск
- Urban-type settlement
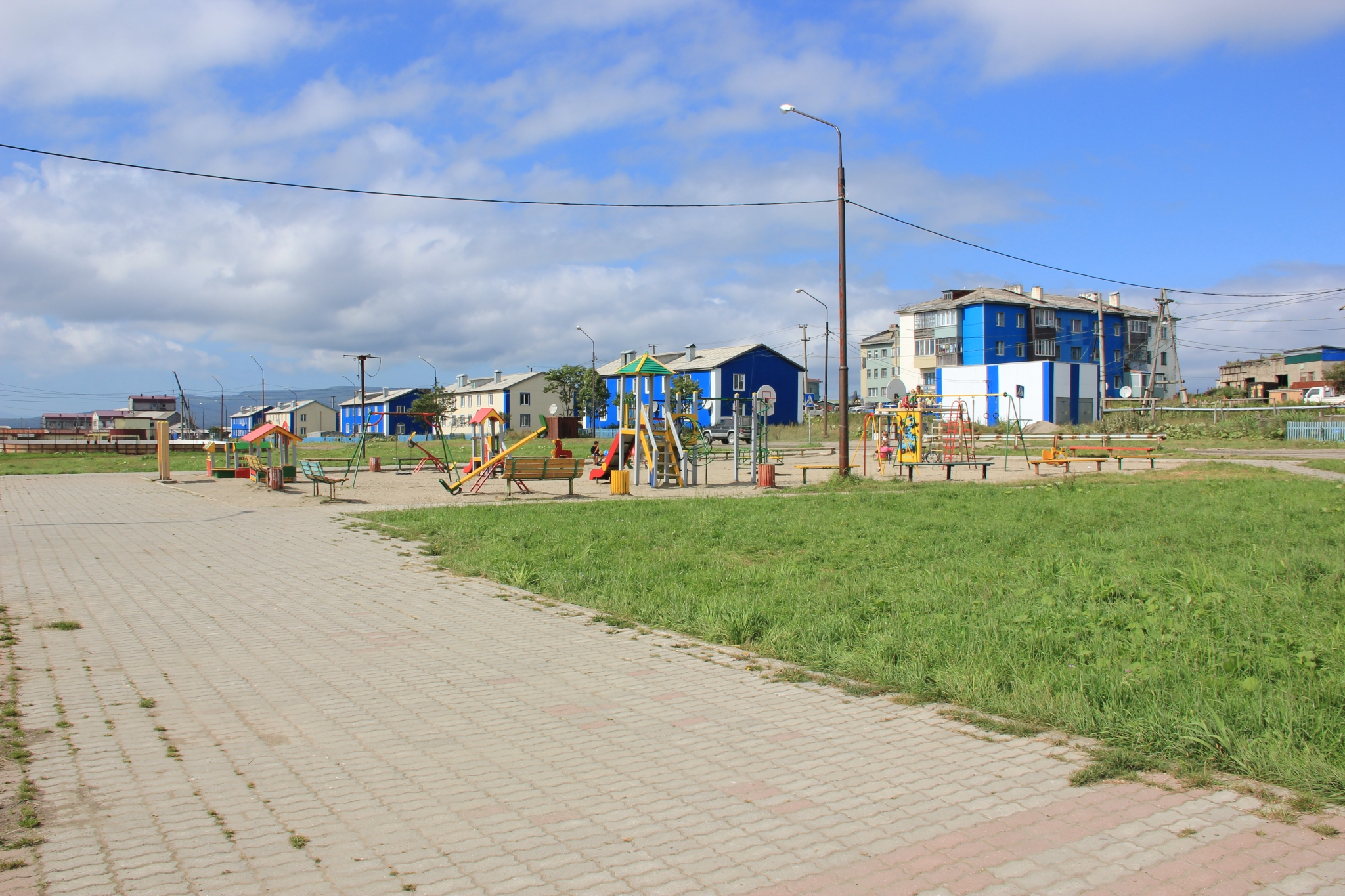
- Yuzhno-Kurilsk Central Square

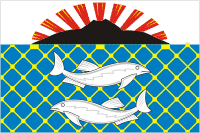
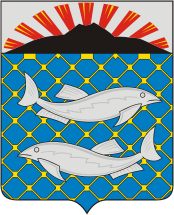
- Flag Coat of arms
- Interactive map of Yuzhno-Kurilsk
- Location of Yuzhno-Kurilsk Yuzhno-Kurilsk (Sakhalin Oblast)
- Coordinates: 44°02′N 145°51′E
- Country: Russia
- Federal subject: Sakhalin Oblast
- Administrative district: Yuzhno-Kurilsky District
- Founded: 1946
- Elevation: 30 m (98 ft)

Population (2010 Census)
  - Total: 5,832
  - Estimate (2023): 7,033 (+20.6%)

Administrative status
  - Capital of: Yuzhno-Kurilsky District

Municipal status
  - Urban okrug: Yuzhno-Kurilsky Urban Okrug
  - Capital of: Yuzhno-Kurilsky Urban Okrug
- Time zone: UTC+11 (MSK+8)
- Postal code: 694500
- Dialing code: +7 42455
- OKTMO ID: 64756000051

Yuzhno-Kurilsk (Russian: Ю́жно-Кури́льск; Japanese: ユジノ・クリリスク, romanized: Yujino-Kuririsuku) is an urban locality (an urban-type settlement) and the administrative center of Yuzhno-Kurilsky District of Sakhalin Oblast, Russia. Population: 5,832 (2010 census); 5,751 (2002 census); 6,344 (1989 Soviet census). It is the largest settlement on the Kunashir Island of the Kuril Islands.

== History ==
The history of Yuzhno-Kurilsk is connected with the history of the Kuril Islands as a whole. In Russia, the Kuril Islands first became known after an expedition by Russian explorer Ivan Moskvitin and his companions, after which another explorer named Kolobov in 1646 talked of the Ainus—the indigenous inhabitants of the Kuriles. According to some Japanese sources, Kunashir became known to Russians later than the other islands of the Kuril chain.

After that, the Kuriles, Sakhalin, and Hokkaido were explored and settled both by the Russians and Japanese. By the end of the 18th century, first settlements of Russian exiles and volunteers appeared on the Kuriles. Also, along with Ainu settlements, the islands had a Japanese trading post and fortified settlements with military garrisons. In 1769, Lieutenant Ivan Chyorny was informed that the Japanese on Kunashir had founded a settlement with a fortress and a permanent garrison.

Weakened by the Crimean War, in 1855 Russia signed the Treaty of Shimoda and ceded a part of the South Kuril Islands to Japan, including the island of Kunashir. The Japanese predecessor of Yuzhno-Kurilsk, the village of Furukamappu (Furukamappu (古釜布)), was located in the northeastern corner of the eponymous bay. Furukamappu, with the neighboring villages of Okinokotan and Isoyanbetsu had fifty houses. There was a post office with the telegraph and shops. When the island was administered by Japan (1855–1945), other settlements were founded as well.

Kunashir came under Soviet control on September 1, 1945, as a result of the Kuril landing operation. A Platoon of the Machine Gun Battalion of the 113th Infantry Brigade of the 87th Infantry Corps of the 2nd Far Eastern Front landed near Furukamappu. On the shore there was a Japanese battalion commander waiting for them with a white flag in hands. The Japanese garrison surrendered without a fight. On February 2, 1946, the island was included in the Yuzhno-Sakhalinsk (Sakhalin) Oblast of the USSR, and the village of Yuzhno-Kurilsk was founded. The first Yuzhno-Kurilsk City Council and all the services of civil authority were formed from members of the 113th Infantry Brigade. Captain Babukhadiya, an artillery division battery commander, became the first chairman of the regional executive committee.

After World War II, active construction was launched using Soviet military forces. Japanese prisoners of war who were kept on Kunashir in a separate camp were also used for the construction. Japanese prisoners of war were given the same rations as Soviet soldiers. The Japanese wore their uniform with their own insignia, were divided into platoons and companies with their commanders in the lead. They moved around in formation, abided by strict discipline and order according to the statutes of the Japanese army (if it posed no harm to the Soviet side).

According to the decision of the Soviet Government, in the summer of 1947 all the Japanese people were repatriated from the Kuril Islands to Hokkaido, Japan. By that time Kunashir was settled by many immigrants and seasonal workers from various regions of the Soviet Union. Fisheries based on Kunashir and Shikotan began to increase their production output and revenues.

After the 1953 tsunami, many Yuzhno-Kurilsk public facilities had to be rebuilt 30 meters (98 ft) above the previous level. After the 1994 earthquake in the open sea to the east of the island of Hokkaido, the buildings sustained extensive damage and were rebuilt at a new location.

After a period of uncertainty and decline in the 1990s, largely caused by the fears that the island was going to be ceded to Japan, Yuzhno-Kurilsk gradually began to revive. A Federal Program for the Development of the Kuril Islands involves a significant investment to build a new airport, roads and other facilities on the island.

== Administrative and municipal status ==
Within the framework of administrative divisions, Yuzhno-Kurilsk serves as the administrative center of Yuzhno-Kurilsky District and is subordinated to it. As a municipal division, the urban-type settlement of Yuzhno-Kurilsk and nine rural localities of Yuzhno-Kurilsky District are incorporated as Yuzhno-Kurilsky Urban Okrug.

== Climate ==
Yuzhno-Kurilsk has a humid continental climate (Köppen Dfb) with strong influences from the North Pacific Ocean and Sea of Okhotsk. However, precipitation is much heavier than in most humid-continental climates, owing to the presence of strong onshore winds from the Pacific Ocean. However, these also make the whole Kuril Islands archipelago extremely cloudy, especially in summer, when fog from the cold Oyashio Current produces near-saturation humidity and extremely high cloudiness. However, Yuzhno-Kurilsk itself is less affected than areas like Simushir in the Kuril Islands to the northeast, because it is somewhat shielded from fog by nearby Japan's Shiretoko and Nemuro Peninsulas and actually receives more sunshine than Wakkanai and only marginally less than Sapporo. In Yuzhno-Kurilsk, with powerful oceanic and marine influences (producing strong seasonal lag), average monthly temperatures are lowest in February, and highest in August, but warmer in September than July, suggesting the year's highest average temperatures occur in late August – exceptionally late in the year, relative to the rest of the Northern Hemisphere. Average monthly precipitation is lowest in February, and highest in September – the latter resulting in part from tropical weather systems, including former typhoons approaching from over or near Japan to the southwest, and bringing high winds and heavy rains.

Maritime influences are also reflected in summer temperatures here being much lower than in comparable latitudes in the interior of Asia; for example, the warmest month at Yuzhno-Kurilsk is 5 °C (9.0 °F) cooler than at Vladivostok and 9 °C (16 °F) cooler than in Harbin. Due to its less cold winters, these differences even out during the course of the year, but Yuzhno-Kurilsk has a 10 °C (18 °F) colder climate annually than Genoa, Italy, on the exact same latitude.

In winter, Yuzhno-Kurilsk lies in a sharp transition zone between pulses of frigid air from the Siberian High centered over northeastern Russia during winter, and the much milder (but still chilly), wet and stormy Aleutian Low over the North Pacific Ocean to the east and northeast. In summer, clouds, fog and cooling influence from the Sea of Okhotsk and Oyashio Current predominate. Combined over the year, these features produce an exceptionally cold climate for a marine area for this near 44 degrees north-latitude location.

Climate data for Yuzhno-Kurilsk (1991–2020, extremes 1947–present)
Month	Jan	Feb	Mar	Apr	May	Jun	Jul	Aug	Sep	Oct	Nov	Dec	Year
Record high °C (°F)	8.5 (47.3)	9.7 (49.5)	12.7 (54.9)	19.9 (67.8)	26.1 (79.0)	29.0 (84.2)	30.4 (86.7)	30.5 (86.9)	27.3 (81.1)	22.4 (72.3)	18.2 (64.8)	13.3 (55.9)	30.5 (86.9)
Mean daily maximum °C (°F)	−1.5 (29.3)	−2.2 (28.0)	0.7 (33.3)	5.1 (41.2)	9.0 (48.2)	11.6 (52.9)	15.5 (59.9)	18.3 (64.9)	17.8 (64.0)	13.6 (56.5)	7.6 (45.7)	1.4 (34.5)	8.1 (46.6)
Daily mean °C (°F)	−3.9 (25.0)	−4.9 (23.2)	−2.0 (28.4)	1.9 (35.4)	5.5 (41.9)	8.9 (48.0)	12.9 (55.2)	15.9 (60.6)	15.4 (59.7)	11.1 (52.0)	4.9 (40.8)	−1.0 (30.2)	5.4 (41.7)
Mean daily minimum °C (°F)	−6.0 (21.2)	−7.3 (18.9)	−4.3 (24.3)	−0.4 (31.3)	3.2 (37.8)	7.1 (44.8)	11.2 (52.2)	14.2 (57.6)	13.4 (56.1)	8.5 (47.3)	2.2 (36.0)	−3.2 (26.2)	3.2 (37.8)
Record low °C (°F)	−16.5 (2.3)	−20.3 (−4.5)	−18.0 (−0.4)	−9.4 (15.1)	−3.1 (26.4)	0.3 (32.5)	2.8 (37.0)	7.0 (44.6)	4.3 (39.7)	−3.5 (25.7)	−7.6 (18.3)	−13.6 (7.5)	−20.3 (−4.5)
Average precipitation mm (inches)	60 (2.4)	45 (1.8)	69 (2.7)	89 (3.5)	124 (4.9)	117 (4.6)	134 (5.3)	166 (6.5)	179 (7.0)	131 (5.2)	104 (4.1)	83 (3.3)	1,301 (51.2)
Average extreme snow depth cm (inches)	12 (4.7)	19 (7.5)	17 (6.7)	3 (1.2)	0 (0)	0 (0)	0 (0)	0 (0)	0 (0)	0 (0)	1 (0.4)	6 (2.4)	19 (7.5)
Average rainy days	4	2	5	15	22	23	25	23	21	21	19	9	189
Average snowy days	28	25	24	13	3	0	0	0	0	2	14	26	135
Average relative humidity (%)	73	74	77	82	87	93	95	92	84	75	73	72	81
Mean monthly sunshine hours	113	153	172	161	166	123	103	117	160	175	124	113	1,680
Source 1: Pogoda.ru.net
Source 2: NOAA (sun, 1961–1990)

== Transportation ==
Aurora Airlines operates flights to and from Yuzhno-Sakhalinsk 3 times per week, out of Mendeleyevo Airport (ICAO: UHSM), located 20 kilometers outside Yuzhno-Kurilsk. One or two times every month in summer, there is a ferry service connecting to Korsakov on Sakhalin island.
