= Vladivostok Air Flight 352 =

2001 aviation accident

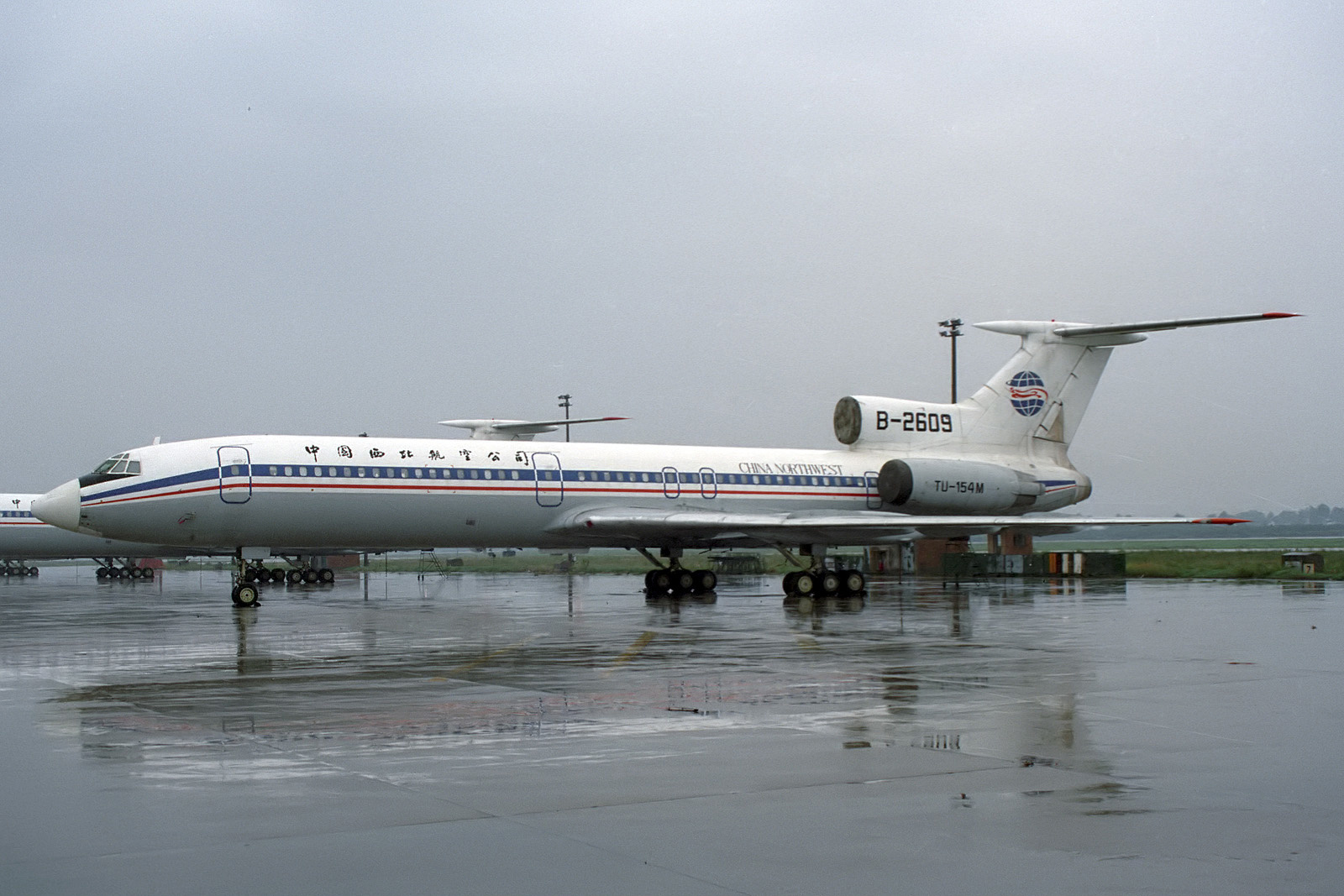
- RA-85845, the aircraft involved in the accident, while still in service with China Northwest Airlines with a previous registration in 1999

Accident
- Date: 4 July 2001
- Summary: Stalled on approach due to pilot error
- Site: Burdakovka, Irkutsk Oblast, Russia; 52°7.604′0″N 104°37.331′0″E

Aircraft
- Aircraft type: Tupolev Tu-154M
- Aircraft name: Ussuriysk
- Operator: Vladivostok Air
- IATA flight No.: XF352
- ICAO flight No.: VLK352
- Call sign: (85)845
- Registration: RA-85845
- Flight origin: Koltsovo International Airport, Sverdlovsk Oblast, Russia
- Stopover: Irkutsk International Airport, Irkutsk Oblast, Russia
- Destination: Vladivostok International Airport, Primorsky Krai, Russia
- Occupants: 145
- Passengers: 136
- Crew: 9
- Fatalities: 145
- Survivors: 0

Vladivostok Air Flight 352 was a scheduled passenger flight from Yekaterinburg, Russia to Vladivostok via Irkutsk. On 4 July 2001, the aircraft operating the flight, a Tupolev Tu-154M with tail number RA-85845, lost control, stalled, and crashed while approaching Irkutsk Airport. All 136 passengers and 9 flight crew members aboard perished, making it the third deadliest aircraft crash over Russian territory to date after Aeroflot Flight 3352 and Aeroflot Flight 217.

Russian investigation committee MAK attributed the causes of the crash to pilot error. During the approach, the crew made erroneous input on the aircraft's yoke, causing the airspeed to deplete. A series of errors then caused the yoke to be excessively pulled, causing the aircraft to enter a corkscrew. The crew tried to recover but failed due to the aircraft's insufficient altitude.

== Background ==
=== Aircraft ===
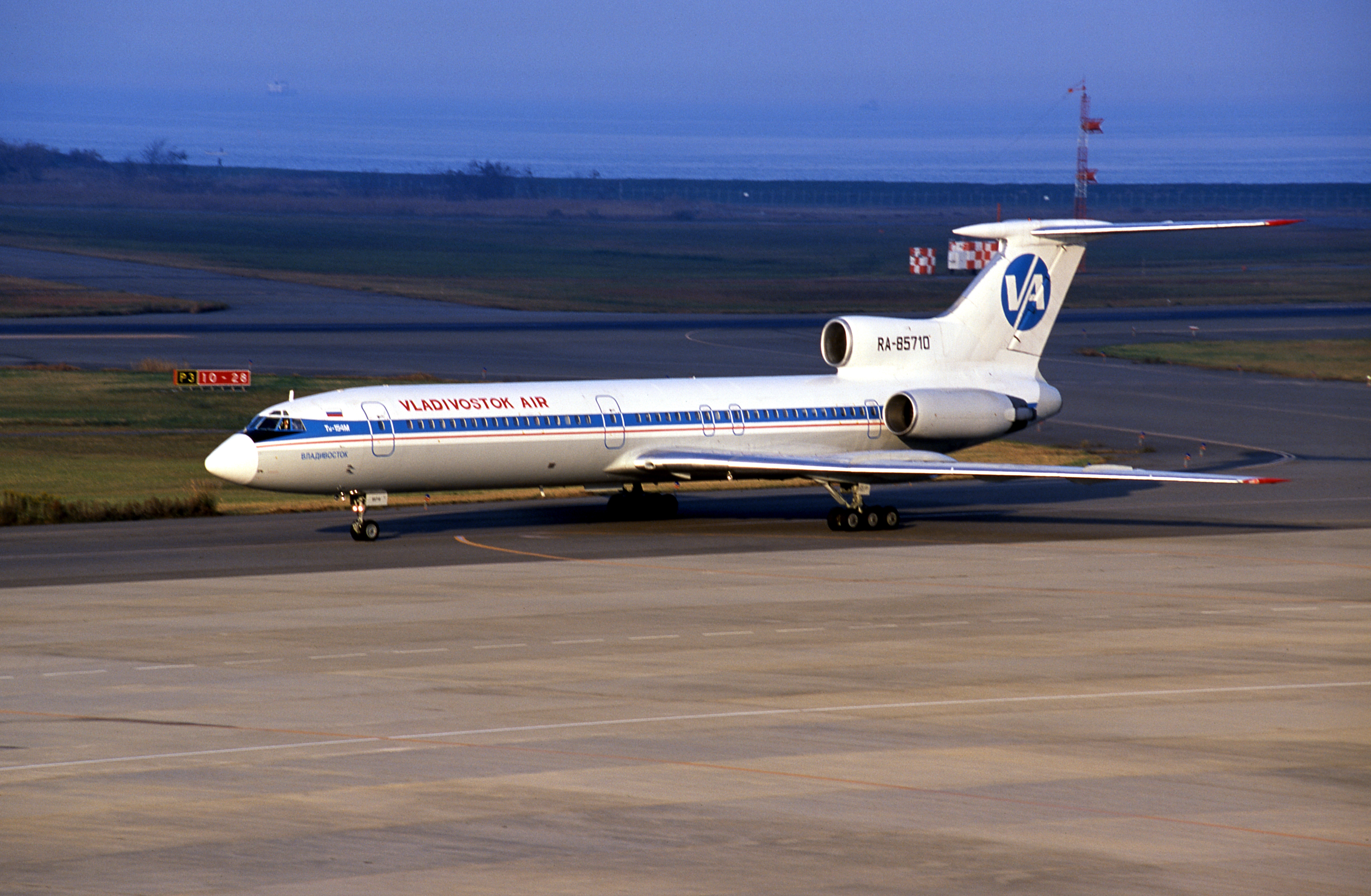
Flight 352 would have been displayed in a livery similar to this Vladivostok Air Tupolev Tu-154M at Niigata Airport in 2009.

The aircraft involved was a 15-year-old Tupolev Tu-154-M registered as RA-85845 with a manufacturer serial number of 86A735. Produced in 1986, the aircraft was first delivered to Chinese state-owned CAAC Airlines and was registered as B-2609. It was then operated by multiple Chinese airliners before being delivered to Vladivostok Air under a lease agreement in 2001. The aircraft was named as Ussuriysk.

The aircraft had been stored in Vnukovo International Airport for maintenance from October 2000 until April 2001. It later flew to Vladivostok Airport and entered service in April. The aircraft had flown for approximately 390 hours with Vladivostok Air.

=== Passengers and crew ===
There were 145 passengers and crews on board, consisting of 136 passengers and 9 crew members, including 6 children. Most of the passengers were Russian. Officials reported that up to 12 Chinese were aboard the aircraft. According to the passenger manifest, a total of 48 passengers were heading to Irkutsk. The rest of the passengers, 88 people, were going to fly to Vladivostok. Local media reported that 21 people were residents of the Russian city of Artyom in Primorsky Krai.

| Nationality | Passengers | Crew | Total |
|---|---|---|---|
| Russia | 124 | 9 | 133 |
| China | 12 | 0 | 12 |
| Total | 136 | 9 | 145 |

There were 9 crew members, consisting of 4 cockpit crew and 5 cabin crew members. The commander of the flight was identified as Captain 51-year-old Valentin Stepanovich Goncharuk. He graduated from St. Petersburg Buguruslan Aviation School and had flown with Antonov and Ilyushin aircraft. Described as an experienced pilot, he had flown with Tupolev since 1979. The second-in-command was First Officer Sergei Alexandrovich Didenko. The flight engineer was Yury Alexandrovich Stepanov, the navigator was Nikolai Nikolaevich Sakrytin and five flight attendants: Olga Mikhailovna Belozyorova, Anna Vikotorovna Biryukova, Evgenia Vasilievna Isaeva, Elena Vasilievna Kulikova and Viktor Pavlovich Morozov.

== Flight ==
Flight 352 was a flight from Yekaterinburg in the Ural region to Vladivostok, Russian Far East with a refuelling stop at the Siberian city of Irkutsk. The flight was operated by Vladivostok Air with a Tupolev Tu-154. On 3 July 2001, the aircraft was cleared to fly to Irkutsk, piloted by Captain Valentin Stepanovich Goncharuk and First Officer Sergei Alexandrovich Didenko. The weather was in good condition for a safe flight and the forecast didn't indicate any significant change. The flight to Irkutsk was estimated to take about 3 hours and 40 minutes. It was expected to arrive in Vladivostok at 09:50 local time.

The flight took off from Yekaterinburg Koltsovo Airport at 19:47 local time and climbed to 5,000 metres (16,000 ft). It later climbed to its cruising altitude of 10,000 metres (33,000 ft). The entire enroute phase was uneventful.

=== Approach ===
At 01:50 Irkutsk Time, the flight crew commenced the flight's descent to Irkutsk. During the descent, a flight briefing was conducted. The commander of the flight, Captain Goncharuk, then distributed the duties of each crew members. Members in charge of piloting will be seated on the right while members in charge of communication and control on the left. Captain Goncharuk was the pilot not flying and was in charge of monitoring the flight instrument, while First Officer Didenko was the pilot flying.

Several minutes later, the aircraft reached point Razdolye and contacted the controller in Irkutsk about the current position of Flight 352. The controller cleared the aircraft to descent to 2,700 metres (8,900 ft) and then to 2,100 metres (6,900 ft) to proceed to the third turn of the airport.

| 01:58:22 | Dispatcher | Irkutsk approach 85845, g'evening Razdolye at 5700, information X-ray |
| 01:58:32 | ATC | 85545, Irkutsk approach, g'evening, final 282 degrees, distance 80 (km), descend and maintain 2700 (meters) to downwind, left pattern. |
| 01:58:43 | Dispatcher | 845, to downwind descending 2700 meters. |

As the aircraft reached the altitude of 2,100 metres (6,900 ft), at 02:05 local time, Captain Goncharuk reported that he had established visual contact with the runway. The aircraft was travelling at an airspeed of 540 kilometres per hour (290 kn; 340 mph), above the permissible airspeed for the extension of the landing gear. The aircraft eventually levelled off at 900 metres (3,000 ft) and the airspeed decreased to 420 kilometres per hour (230 kn; 260 mph), still a little faster than the allowed speed. Subsequently, Captain Goncharuk asked the crew to decrease the speed. The aircraft then went into clouds, obstructing the horizon from the cockpit view.

The crew had completed the first and second turn towards the airport and decided to initiate the third turn. The aircraft was then put into a left turn, with a varying bank angle of 20 - 23 degrees. The navigator then extended the landing gear, while the flaps and slats configuration were not changed. The airspeed then decreased to 365 kilometres per hour (197 kn; 227 mph), approximately 5 kilometres per hour (2.7 kn; 3.1 mph) lower than the minimum amount for the current stage of flight. Captain Goncharuk warned the crew about the drop in speed. Being cautious on the decreasing speed, he decided to add more thrust slowly, just enough to maintain their altitude at 850 metres (2,790 ft) and speed at 355–360 km/h (192–194 kn; 221–224 mph).

=== Accident ===
While the turn was being carried out by the crew, the bank angle suddenly increased, up to 16.5 degrees. A warning then sounded. First Officer Didenko then tried to correct this by making a nose down input of -4 degrees and a left bank input into the steering column, causing the autopilot to disconnect and the bank angle to increase, from 20 degrees to 30 degrees. First Officer Didenko repeatedly banked the aircraft to the left. The bank angle then passed the maximum bank angle value, reaching 48 degrees to the left. Captain Goncharuk noticed this and asked First Officer Didenko to stop banking the aircraft towards the left.

| 02:07:45 | Commentary | Audio tone of stall warning |
| 02:07:47 | Commentary | Audio tone of autopilot disconnection warning |
| 02:07:49 | Captain | Fuck! What are you doing?! |
| 02:07:51 | Captain | Speed! |
| 02:07:53 | Captain | Fuck! Push it up! (throttles) |
| 02:07:53 | First Officer | Stop! Stop! Where to?! Where to?! |
| 02:07:55 | Captain | Stop stop stop! |

Due to the large bank angle, Captain Goncharuk took over the control from First Officer Didenko and tried to correct the situation. Varying values of left and right bank angle, almost to the maximum, were then recorded on the control column. The aircraft then turned towards the right, but due to the abruptness of the turn, Captain Goncharuk made a left bank angle again. Realizing that the aircraft was banking heavily to the left, First Officer Didenko asked the crew to turn to the right.

The crew then sensed an increase of the aircraft's vertical rate of descent and therefore put an excessive nose up input into the yoke. The aircraft then banked in a severe left bank angle and pitched up in a dangerously high amount. This caused the aircraft to enter an aerodynamic stall. It consequently went into a corkscrew. First Officer Didenko then realized that they needed to add thrust, but they barely had enough time to recover the aircraft.

| 02:08:05 | Unknown | Power! |
| 02:08:06 | Flight engineer | Got it! |
| 02:08:08 | Unknown | Add thrust! |
| 02:08:09 | First Officer | Take-off power! God! |
| 02:08:10 | Flight engineer | Take-off power set! |
| 02:08:11 | Captain | That's all guys! Fuck! |
| 02:08:16 | Commentary | Audio tone of radio altimeter alert. |
| 02:08:22 | Commentary | End of recording |

On 4 July, at 02:08 local time, the aircraft crashed with its belly first near the settlement of Burdakovka, approximately 22 kilometres (14 mi; 12 nmi) from Irkutsk. It immediately exploded upon impact, instantly killing all 145 passengers and crew members on board.

Nearby residents saw a flashing light followed by an explosion and a column of fire. A woman from Burdakovka reported to the firefighters that an aircraft had crashed onto a farm field. The impact caused local fires in the crash site. A total of 180 firefighters were deployed to extinguish the flames. Helicopters were flown from Irkutsk to the crash site. At least 200 rescue workers were involved in the operation. Recovery efforts were hampered by the forested and swampy terrain of the crash site. Fragments of the aircraft were scattered over a compact area.

By the evening of 4 July, ITAR-TASS reported that all of the victims - 136 passengers and 9 crew members - had been recovered from the crash site.

== Response ==
=== Government response ===
In the immediate aftermath, relatives of the passengers who had arrived in Irkutsk to welcome the passengers were repeatedly told that there had been a delay on the arrival of the flight. They later learned that the flight had crashed from local news. In Vladivostok, relatives who had not heard about the news were initially told that the flight wouldn't arrive in Vladivostok, with no explanation being given to the relatives on the cause. They were later ushered into the waiting room of the airport's terminal by employees of Vladivostok Air, where a team of psychologists and medics had been put on standby. In Yekaterinburg, families gathered at the VIP lounge area of the terminal. Helplines for the relatives were established in Yekaterinburg, Irkutsk and Vladivostok.

Chartered flights were provided by authorities to fly relatives to Irkutsk. All expenses, including accommodations and meals, were provided by local government of Irkutsk and the costs, including long-distance calls, were to be covered by Vladivostok Air. Relatives, however, were not allowed to visit the crash site as the only access road to the site was blocked by police.

Then-Russian Minister of Emergency Situations Sergei Shoigu flew to the crash site to monitor the recovery efforts. He stated that the ministry would send an Ilyushin Il-76 with an additional rescuers team and equipment to the site of the crash. This flight was later cancelled as officials in Irkutsk stated that the number of rescuers in Irkutsk were sufficient for the recovery operation. Deputy Minister of Sverdlovsk Oblast Viktor Shtager flew to Irkutsk to organize the repatriation process of the victims from Sverdlovsk Ovlast. Head of the East-Siberian Interregional Territorial Air Transport Administration, Yury Zhuravlev, announced that the controllers who were on duty during the crash of Flight 352 had been suspended from work.

The government of Primorsky Krai and Sverdlovsk Oblast initially announced a regionwide day of mourning on 5 July. State flags will be flown at half-mast throughout the region and entertainment events will be cancelled. Radio and television programs will be preceded with a minute of silence for the victims. Frontpages of Russian newspapers will be printed in black and white. Russian President Vladimir Putin later issued a decree declaring 5 July as a national day of mourning. He ordered the sitting Russian Prime Minister Mikhail Kasyanov to form a special investigation commission that will be headed by Deputy Prime Minister Ilya Klebanov.

=== Funeral ===
Memorial services were held throughout the country. In Sverdlovsk Oblast, the local archbishop announced that memorial services will be held under the Yekaterinburg diocese. Funerals in absentia were held due to requests by relatives. In Irkutsk, local traders reportedly lowered prices of their goods in response to the crash. In Artyom, where 21 residents were victims of the crash, a memorial service was held at Artyom's Coal Miners' Palace of Culture. The procession drew thousands of mourners, stretching for hundreds of meters. At one point, an Antonov An-2 flew over the mourners at an extremely low altitude as a sign of farewell to the victims. Victims from the city will be buried at the Sea and Forest cemeteries. According to report, the bodies of 7 crew, including Captain Goncharuk and First Officer Didenko, will be buried in a mass grave. Governing Artyom mayor Vladimir Novikov stated that "There has never been a more terrible tragedy in the history of our city." In Vladivostok, a funeral procession was held in the city's central square. Mayor of Vladivostok Yury Kopylov stated that a memorial for the victims of the crash will be constructed at the city's cemetery.

Vladivostok Air agreed to build a memorial complex at Shevelevsky cemetery in Artyom, with a cost of about 1.5 million rubles. Near the memorial complex, an orthodox chapel was also constructed, which was fitted with a bell. The memorial complex was unveiled on the anniversary of the crash. An obelisk was also erected at the crash site in Irkutsk, while in Vladivostok a memorial was built in the city's maritime cemetery.

=== Compensation ===
Regarding the compensations for the families of the victims, Ilya Klebanov stated that the Russian government would not provide compensations to the families. Instead, responsibility of the payments would be handed over to insurance companies. Vladivostok Air stated that they would pay ₽30,000 rubles for the burial of the victims and total amount of compensations would be deliberated further. Several families of the victims were not satisfied with the amount and demanded additional compensation. The first lawsuit was opened in Artyom in November. As of February 2002, agreements on the amount of compensations had been reached by the relatives of 93 victims. The last lawsuit was settled in May 2003.

== Investigation ==
=== Initial aftermath ===
Hours after the crash, several theories were immediately thought as one of the possible causes of the crash. Those included sabotage, mechanical error and pilot error, Minister of Emergency Situations Sergei Shoigu stated that the aircraft had fallen from a height of 800 meters during the flight's third circle to the airport. He further stated that all three engines of the Tupolev Tu-154 had failed in flight and caused the crew to lose their control on the aircraft. However, he added that it was too soon to make judgements regarding the cause of the accident.

Both flight recorders were recovered from the crash site on 4 July and were taken to Moscow for decryption.

Officials from the Tupolev Design Bureau emphasized that the automatic control system could not cause the aircraft to exceed the critical angle of attack and g-forces. They added that the on board computer would've prevented the pilots from making mistakes.

The findings on the crash site indicated that the aircraft had stalled. Investigators stated that the aircraft had fallen flat on its belly while rotating on an axis. The wreckage was concentrated and the spread of the debris was small. Irkutsk police stated that the debris field was no more than twice of the aircraft's length.

=== Preliminary findings ===
On 6 July, preliminary findings from the aircraft's flight recorders indicated that pilot error was the most likely cause of the crash. Recordings of the flight didn't indicate that any emergency, including an explosion and engine failure, had occurred during the flight's approach to Irkutsk.

On 10 July, during a press conference, Ilya Klebanov stated that the crash was caused by "human factor". The state probe commission stated that there were no doubts among investigators on the cause of the crash. The aircraft stalled, went into a spin and plunged to the ground as its nose had exceeded the critical angle of attack. According to the commission, the yoke had been excessively pulled by the crew. The aircraft warning system had warned the crew on the dangerous situation for at least twice, but the crew ignored it. Klebanov also stated that the crew's emotional state had changed during the approach. Vladivostok Air disputed Klebanov's statement, claiming that the crash could not have been caused by the crew as they were regarded as experienced pilots.

On 21 August, two executives from Vladivostok Air who were responsible on the crew training and flight safety left their posts following an inspection by the investigation commission. The commission discovered that the crew had overworked. They barely had any vacation on the previous 2–3 years. Many of the airline's crews had barely enough rest before long-distance flights and it was not uncommon for pilots to spend hours on the flight excessively. The commission stated that all of these factors had contributed to the psychological and physical condition of the crew, which led to fatigue during flight.

The commission further stated that Vladivostok Air had violated the existing labor legislations in Russia and was asked to review several aspects of the operation, including the procedure for changing crew, crew's condition, mode and duration of rests.

=== Conclusion ===
External videos
- MAK reconstruction
- CVR and FDR recording of the flight (External view) on YouTube
- CVR and FDR recording of the flight (Cockpit view) on YouTube

The final report was published by the State Commission of Inquiry on 13 December 2001.

During the commencement of the third turn, the crew couldn't maintain the altitude that they had put into the autopilot. The autopilot noticed this and tried to bring the aircraft back to its selected altitude by deflecting the rudder. This caused the bank angle to increase, which caused the stall warning to sound.

The pilots, who were fatigued, then made a series of errors on the controls. First Officer Didenko repeatedly banked the aircraft to the left, causing the autopilot to disengage. While intervening, the Captain made a series of inputs which further endangered the flight. Earlier, the aircraft had entered clouds and obstructed the horizon from the crew. During the intervention, it was likely that he had suffered a spatial disorientation.

First Officer Didenko then realized that the aircraft was banking to the left. The yoke was then excessively pulled, causing the nose to exceed the critical angle of attack. Due to their low speed and landing configuration, the wings lost their lift forces. The aircraft then stalled and "corkscrewed". In their final moments, the crew realized that they needed to add thrust to recover. However, as their altitude was merely at 850 metres (2,790 ft) above the ground, recovery was not possible.

=== Aftermath ===
The commission noted that there were "serious shortcomings" on the oversight from Far East Region Department of the Ministry of Transport as multiple gross violations were found within the operational activities of Vladivostok Air. Two officials from the Ministry of Transport were eventually fired from their positions due to the findings. As the crash of Flight 352 was the third major air disasters in Irkutsk region in the last 10 years, after Baikal Airlines Flight 130 in 1994 and the crash of an Antonov An-124 in 1997, Deputy Minister Alexander Neradko ordered the territorial aviation bodies of the Ministry of Transport to conduct analyses on the previous air disasters and the flight safety in the region. The result of the analyses would be made as a reference for future measures and proposals for flight safety. Said proposals and measures would be forwarded further to the federal government for standardization. Clarifications on the existing regulations regarding the procedure for the organization of Russian airliners were also ordered.

== See also ==
- Accidents which were mentioned in the published investigation report:
  - Khabarovsk United Air Group Flight 3949
  - Aeroflot Flight 593
