= Nogliki Airport =

Airport in Sakhalin, Russia

Nogliki Airport Аэропорт Ноглики
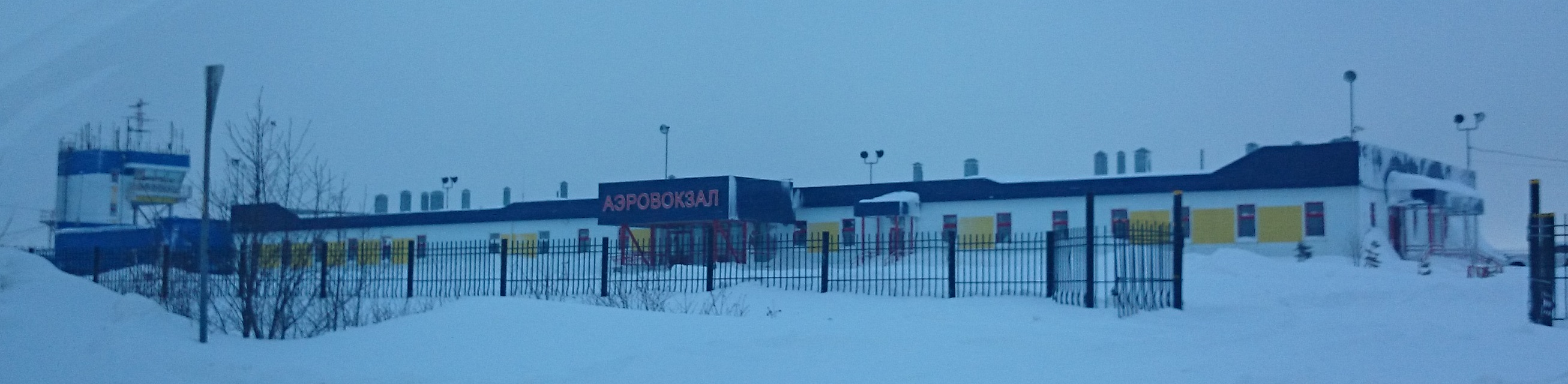
- The airport terminal in 2015
- IATA: NGK; ICAO: UHSN; LID: НГЛ

Summary
- Airport type: Public
- Serves: Nogliki
- Elevation AMSL: 30 m / 98 ft
- Coordinates: 51°47′02″N 143°08′30″E

Map

Runways
Direction	Length		Surface
Direction	m	ft	Surface
04/22	1,750	5,741	Asphalt
- Source: Great Circle Mapper

Nogliki Airport (Russian: Аэропорт Ноглики, Aėroport Nogliki) (IATA: NGK, ICAO: UHSN) is an airport serving Nogliki in Sakhalin Oblast, Russia. Following upgrades by oil and gas companies working on projects in the region, the airport opened to the public in 2004. It is served by the airline Aurora as of December 2017.

== History ==
After obtaining temporary approval from regional authorities, the Nogliki airport opened for public use in October 2004. ExxonMobil and Sakhalin Energy, oil and gas companies working on projects in the region, had upgraded the airport. Sakhalin Energy stated that it spent about US$19 million on the upgrade works. The federal government revoked the approval in 2005, closing the airport to fixed-wing aircraft – although helicopters could still land. The airport has since reopened to all aircraft.

== Infrastructure ==
The Nogliki airport has one runway, which measures 1,750 by 35 metres (5,741 ft × 115 ft).

== Airlines and destinations ==
Airlines	Destinations
Aurora	Khabarovsk, Yuzhno-Sakhalinsk

== See also ==
- List of airports in Russia
