= Yuzhno-Kurilsk Mendeleyevo Airport =

Airport in Yuzhno-Kurilsk, Russia

Yuzhno-Kurilsk Airport Аэропорт Южно-Курильск
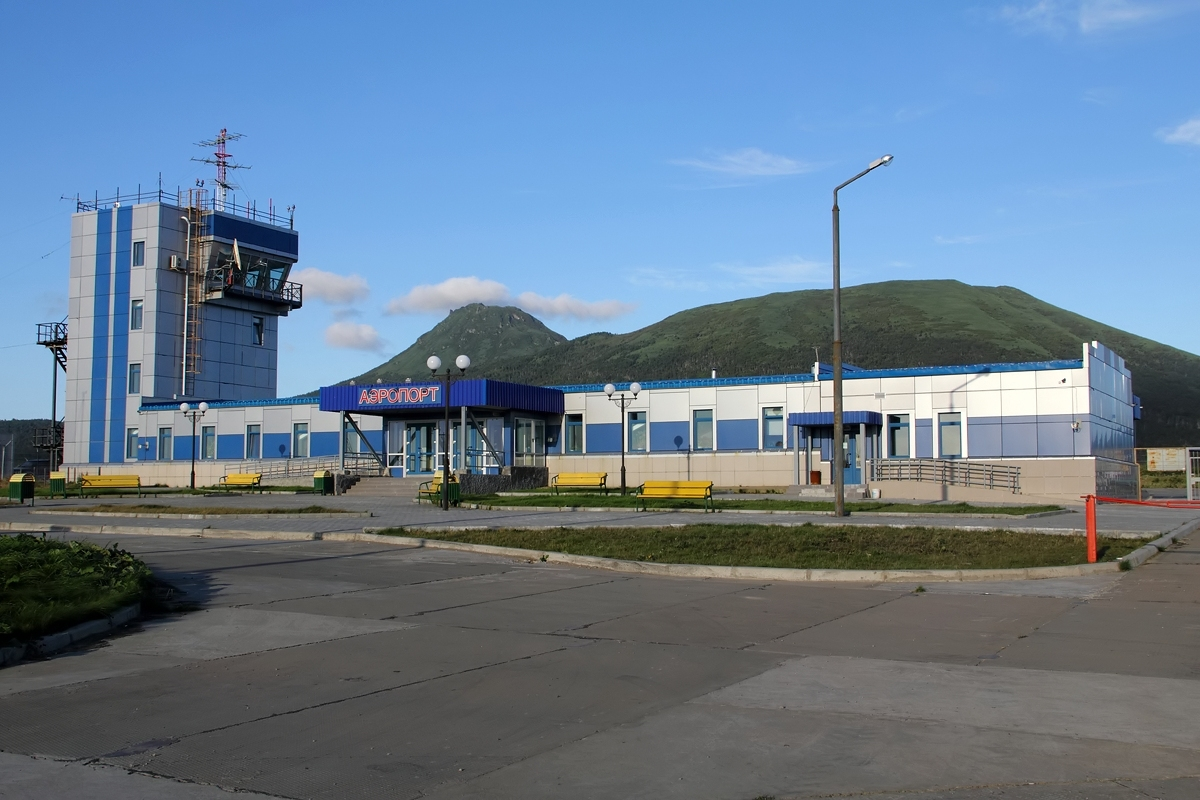
- IATA: DEE; ICAO: UHSM; LID: ЮЖК

Summary
- Airport type: Public
- Serves: Yuzhno-Kurilsk, Russia
- Coordinates: 43°57′40″N 145°41′04″E

Map
- Location of airport in Sakhalin Oblast DEE (Japan)

Yuzhno-Kurilsk Mendeleyevo Airport (Russian: Аэропорт Южно-Курильск, Japanese: メンデレーエフ空港) (IATA: DEE, ICAO: UHSM) is an airport in Yuzhno-Kurilsk, on Kunashir Island in the Kuril Islands, which is under Russian administration but claimed by Japan.

== Airlines and destinations ==
The following airlines offer scheduled passenger service:

Airlines	Destinations
Aurora Airlines	Yuzhno-Sakhalinsk
