= Okha Airport =

Airport in Russia

Okha Airport Аэропорт Оха (Новостройка)
- IATA: OHH; ICAO: UHSH; LID: ОХА

Summary
- Location: Okha, Russia
- Elevation AMSL: 123 ft (37 m)
- Coordinates: 53°31′04″N 142°52′48.33″E

Map
- Location of airport in Sakhalin Oblast

Runways
Direction	Length		Surface
Direction	ft	m	Surface
13L/31R Closed	4,250	1,300	Concrete
13/31	5,262	1,604	Concrete

Okha Airport (Russian: Аэропо́рт Оха́ (Новостро́йка)), also known as Novostroyka Airport, is an airport in Okha, Russia. The airport is located in the village of Novostroyka, about 10 km south-west of the centre of Okha. The runway is planned to be extended 300 meters in 2020 as part of a series of modernizations.

== Airlines and destinations ==
Airlines	Destinations
Aurora	Khabarovsk, Yuzhno-Sakhalinsk
Yakutia Airlines	Khabarovsk

== See also ==
- List of airports in Russia
