= Shakhtyorsk Airport =

Shakhtyorsk Airport Аэропорт Шахтёрск
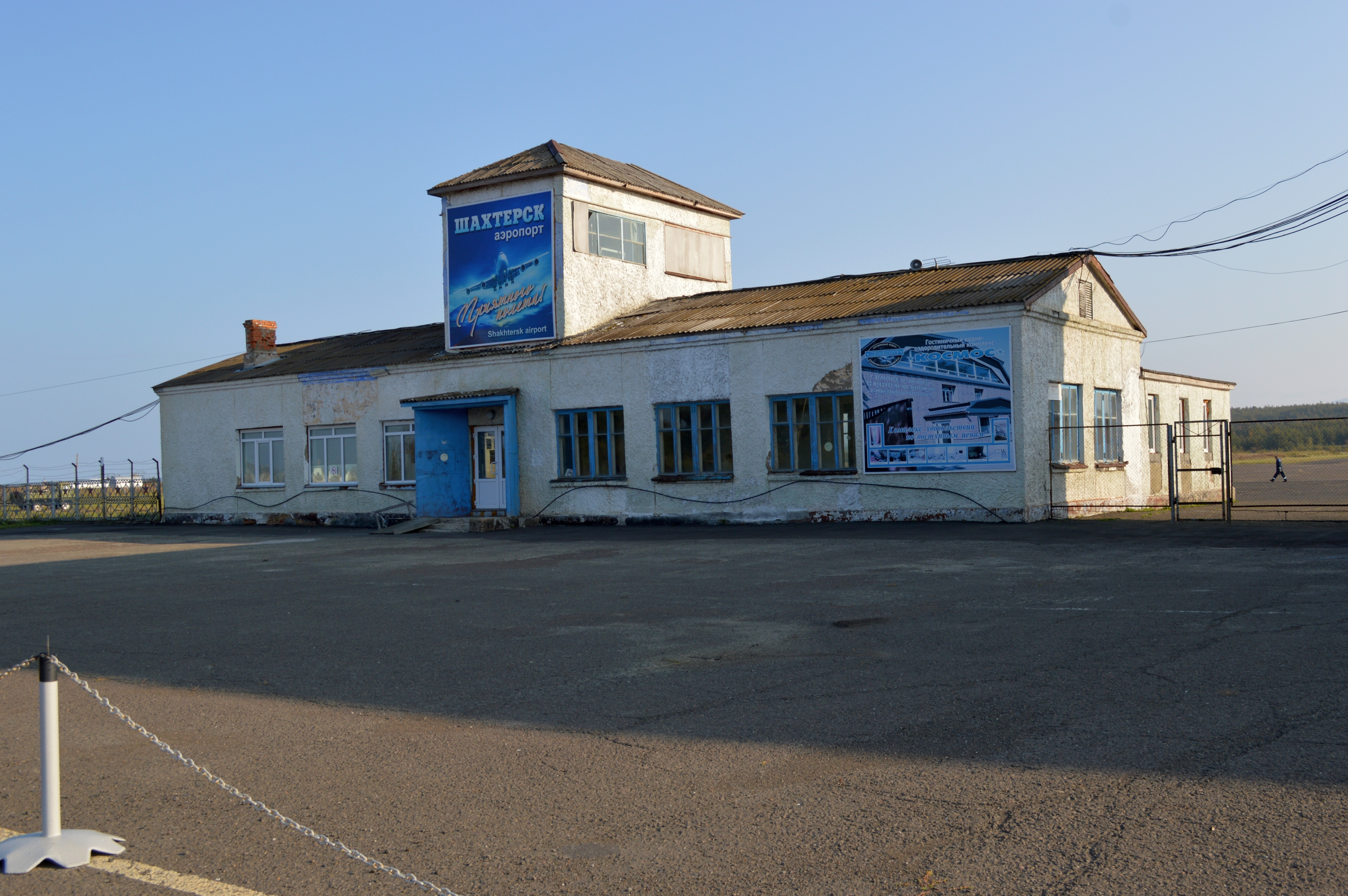
- IATA: EKS; ICAO: UHSK; LID: ШАХ

Summary
- Airport type: Public
- Serves: Shakhtyorsk, Uglegorsky District
- Location: Shakhtyorsk
- Coordinates: 49°11′31″N 142°04′54″E

Map
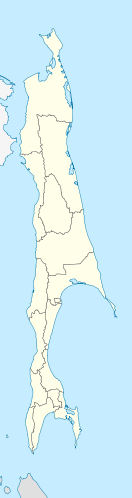
- Location of airport in Sakhalin

Runways
Direction	Length		Surface
Direction	m	ft	Surface
16/34	1,600	5,249

Shakhtyorsk Airport (Russian: Аэропорт Шахтёрск) (IATA: EKS, ICAO: UHSK) is an airport in Shakhtyorsk in the Uglegorsky District of the Sakhalin Oblast.

== Airlines and destinations ==
Airlines	Destinations
Aurora	Khabarovsk, Yuzhno-Sakhalinsk

== See also ==
- List of airports in Russia
