= Zonalnoye Airport =

Zonalnoye
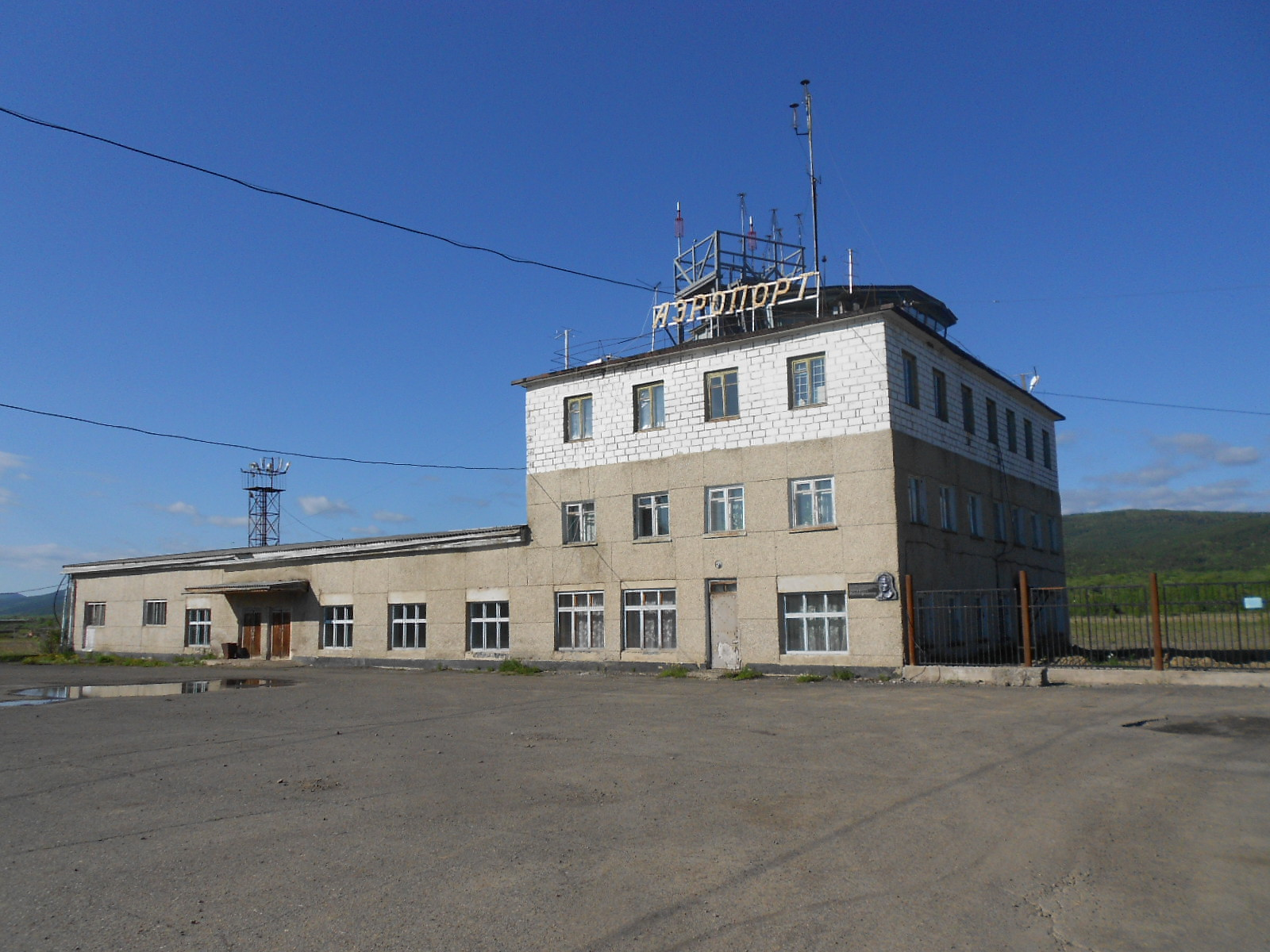
- IATA: ZZO; ICAO: UHSO

Summary
- Airport type: Public
- Location: Tymovskoye
- Elevation AMSL: 479 ft / 146 m
- Coordinates: 50°40′6″N 142°45′36″E

Map

Runways
Direction	Length		Surface
Direction	ft	m	Surface
17/35	4,921	1,500	Asphalt

Zonalnoye Airport (also known as Kirovskoye South) (IATA: ZZO, ICAO: UHSO) is an airport in Sakhalin Oblast, Russia, 21 km (13 mi) southeast of Tymovskoye. It accommodates small airliners. A 1,700 m (5,600 ft) overrun off the southern edge may have been a former airfield.

In 2022, the airfield was excluded from the register of Russian civil aviation airfields.
