= Yuzhno-Sakhalinsk Airport =

Airport on Sakhalin, Russia

Yuzhno-Sakhalinsk International Airport Южно-Сахалинский Международный Аэропорт

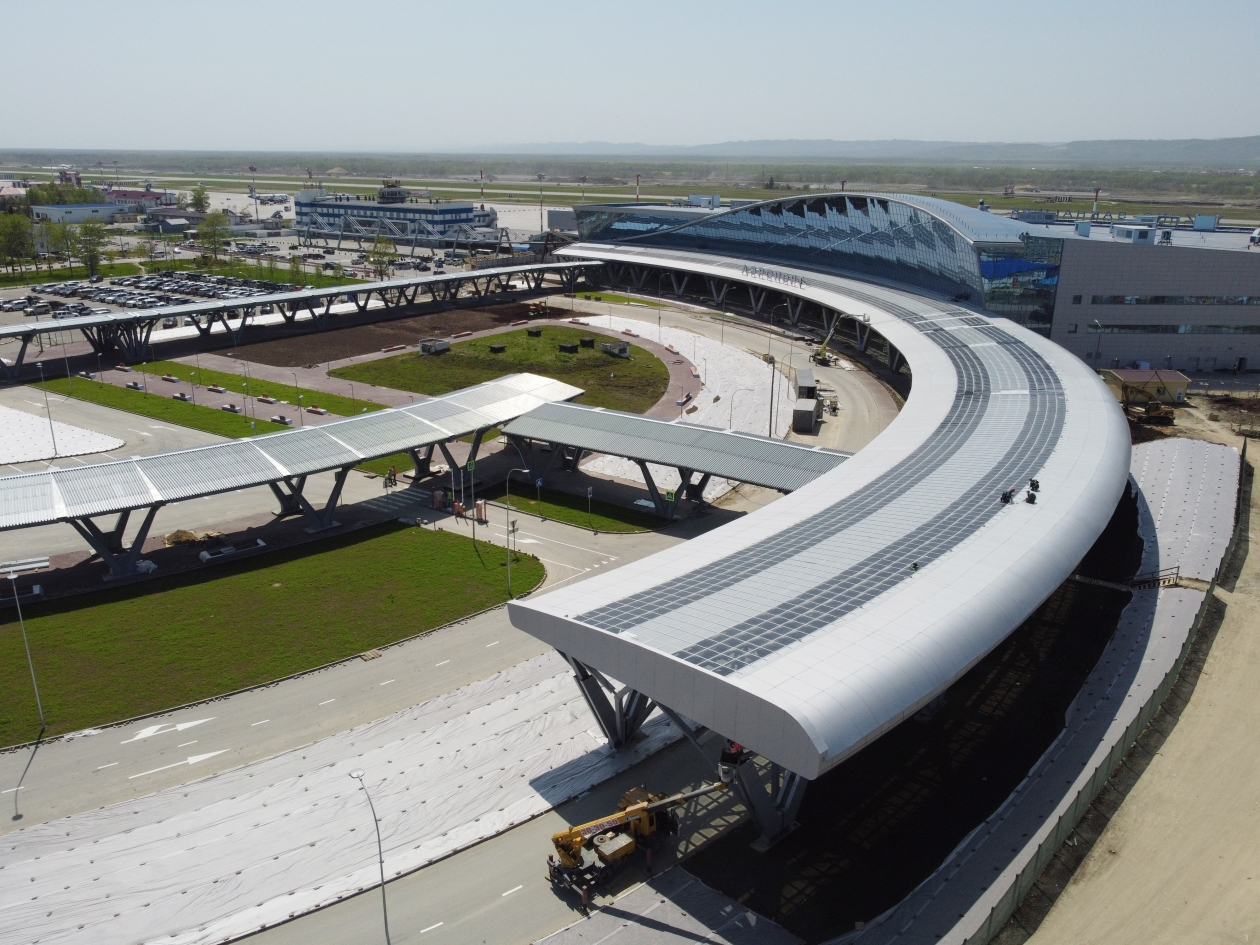
- IATA: UUS; ICAO: UHSS; LID: ЮЖХ

Summary
- Airport type: Public
- Operator: FSUE "Yuzhno-Sakhalinsk Airport"
- Serves: Yuzhno-Sakhalinsk, Russia
- Hub for: Aurora
- Elevation AMSL: 18 m (59 ft)
- Coordinates: 46°53′13″N 142°43′19″E
- Website: www.uusaero.ru

Map
- Location in Sakhalin Oblast Location in Russia

Runways
Direction	Length		Surface
Direction	m	ft	Surface
01/19	3,400	11,158	Concrete

Statistics (2021)
- Passengers: 1,069,627
- Sources: Russian Federal Air Transport Agency (see also provisional 2021 statistics)

Yuzhno-Sakhalinsk International Airport (Russian: Южно-Сахалинский Международный Аэропорт, IATA: UUS, ICAO: UHSS), also called Khomutovo International Airport (Международный Аэропорт Хомутово), is an international airport in Yuzhno-Sakhalinsk, on the island of Sakhalin, Russia. The airport was established in 1945 as a military airfield and is the main airport in Sakhalin Oblast. The airport serves as the headquarters of the 39th Separate Guards Motor Rifle Brigade.

== Facilities ==
Yuzhno-Sakhalinsk International Airport sits at an elevation of 59 feet (18 m) above mean sea level. It has one runway designated 01/19 with a concrete surface measuring 3,400 by 45 metres (11,155 ft × 148 ft).

On August 7, 2023, a new terminal was opened, replacing the old terminal. It is designated to handle 5 million passengers annually, with 6 jet bridges and 11 boarding gates. It features a five-level automated baggage handling system and a state-of-the-art integrated security system with 392 video cameras. While the terminal is complete, construction of a new 3,400-metre runway is ongoing and expected to be finished by September 2026.

The airport has one passenger terminal, two cargo terminals and 16 aircraft stands. It is the largest airport in Sakhalin Oblast.

== Airlines and destinations ==
Airlines	Destinations
Aeroflot	Moscow–Sheremetyevo
Aurora	Alexandrovsk-Sakhalinsky, Beijing–Daxing, Harbin, Kurilsk, Krasnoyarsk, Nogliki, Okha, Petropavlovsk-Kamchatsky, Shakhtyorsk, Shanghai-Pudong, Sovetskaya Gavan, Tymovskoye, Vladivostok, Yuzhno-Kurilsk
IrAero	Blagoveschensk, Khabarovsk, Ulan-Ude
Rossiya Airlines	Blagoveschensk, Khabarovsk, Krasnoyarsk, Moscow–Sheremetyevo, Vladivostok
S7 Airlines	Irkutsk, Khabarovsk, Novosibirsk, Vladivostok

== See also ==
- List of airports in Russia
- List of the busiest airports in the former Soviet Union
