= Vladivostok International Airport =

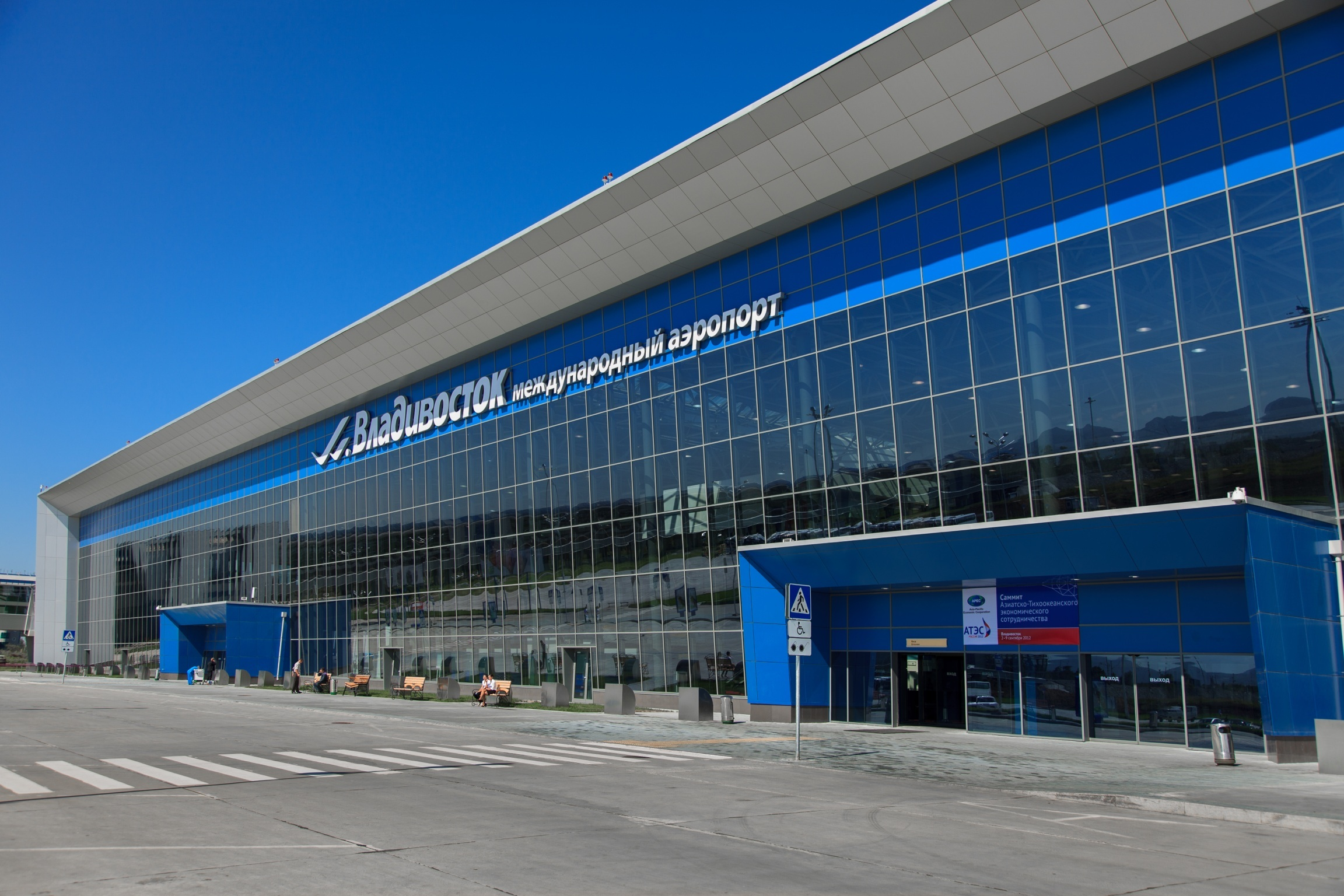
- IATA: VVO; ICAO: UHWW; LID: ВВО

Summary
- Airport type: Public
- Serves: Vladivostok
- Location: Artyom, Russia
- Opened: 1932
- Hub for: Aurora, S7 Airlines
- Elevation AMSL: 46 ft (14 m)
- Coordinates: 43°23′57″N 132°09′05″E
- Website: aerovlad.ru

Map
- Location of airport in Artyom, Primorsky Krai, Russia VVO/UHWW (Russia) VVO/UHWW (Asia)

Runways
Direction	Length		Surface
Direction	ft	m	Surface
06/24	3,191	973	Asphalt
07R/25L	11,483	3,500	Concrete
07L/25R	11,483	3,500	Concrete
16/34	1,975	602	Asphalt

Statistics (2018)
- Passengers served: 2,634,000

Vladivostok International Airport (Russian: Международный аэропорт "Владивосток" Mezhdunarodnyi aeroport Vladivostok) (IATA: VVO, ICAO: UHWW) is an international airport located near Artyom, Primorsky Krai, Russia, roughly an hour's drive (44 kilometres (27 mi)) north of the center of the city of Vladivostok. It was formerly known as Knevichi Airport, named after the village of Knevichi.

== History ==
The Vladivostok Airport was constructed in 1931 near the town of Artyom. Commercial flights began in the summer of 1932. In the decade after World War II, Po-2 and W-2 planes were widely used in air-chemical works and coastal exploration for fish in the service of geologists and forest patrols. Passenger flights on the Moscow - Vladivostok route began in 1948 using Ilyushin Il-12s.

From 1959 to 1964, a complex of ground facilities was built to allow regular flights with larger planes after the closure of the Vtoraya Rechka Airport, encroached by the growing city.

=== Expansion and modernization ===
Domestic Terminal B of the Vladivostok airport underwent complete renovation during 2005–2006, which transformed it into one of the most comfortable and up-to-date airport terminals in Russia. The renovated terminal was re-opened on December 19, 2006.

The federal and regional governments announced plans to rebuild Vladivostok International Airport prior to the APEC Russia 2012 Summit on Russky Island, south of Vladivostok. A new terminal (Terminal A) was built in 2012, at a cost of 7 billion RUB. The capacity of this new terminal building is 3.5 million passengers per year. Runway 07R/25L was also reconstructed and lengthened to 3,500 metres (11,500 ft), making it capable of accommodating every type of aircraft.

Terminal B has since closed and converted to an exhibition center.

== Facilities ==
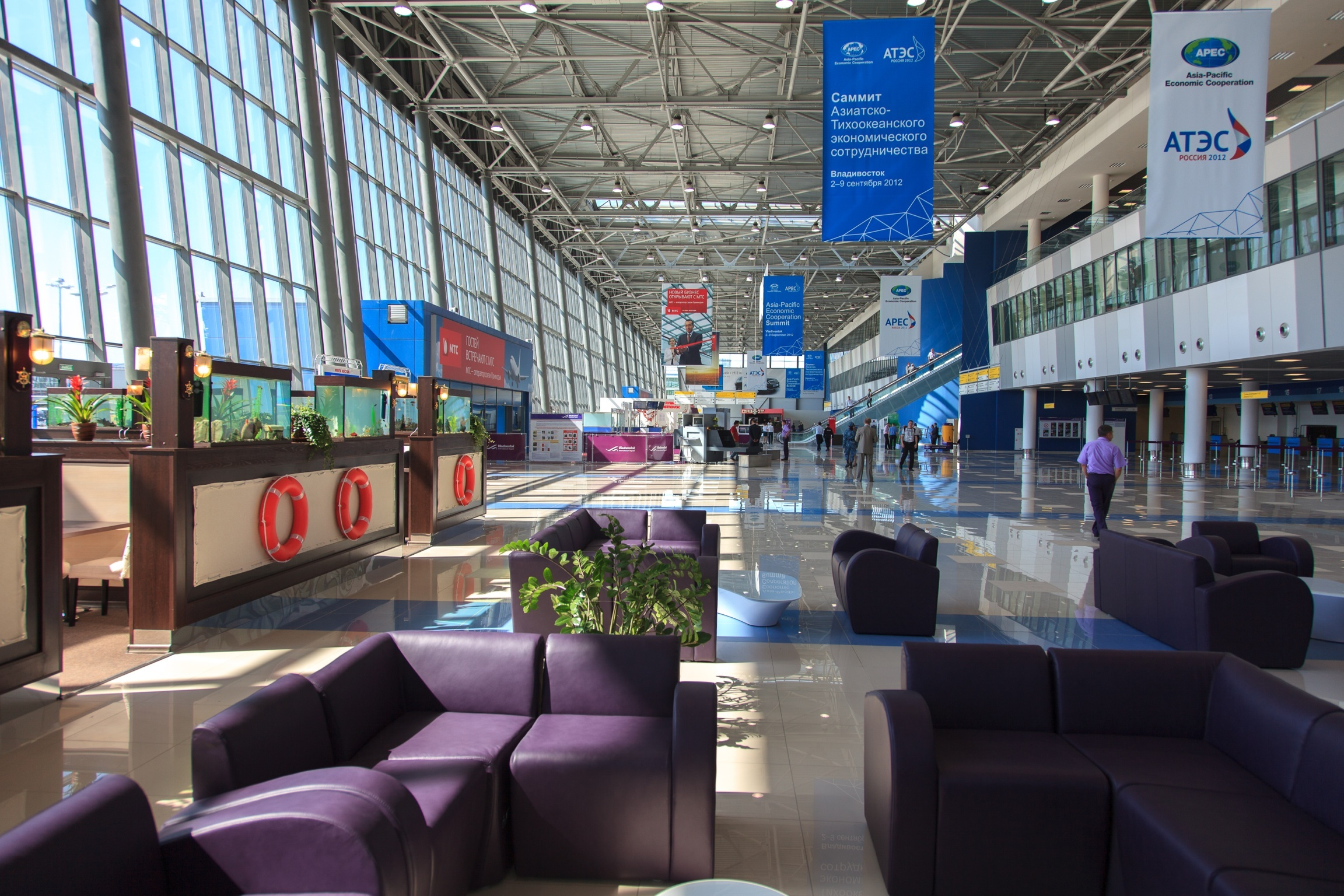
Inside Vladivostok Airport

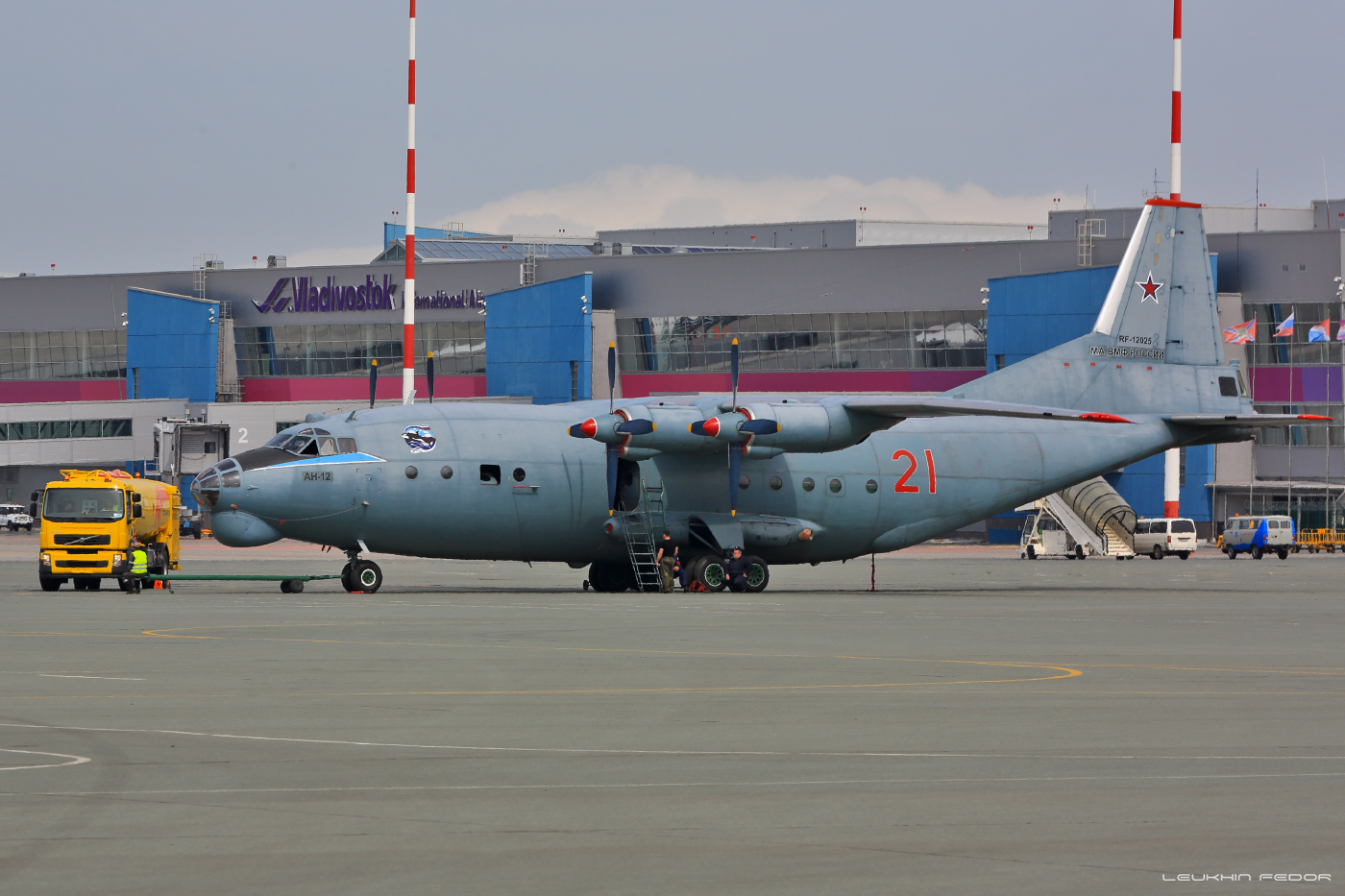
The reconstructed terminal with air-bridges, behind Antonov An-12

The airport consists of two passenger terminals: the old Domestic Terminal B and the new International Terminal A. It has two associated airfields, Lake Springs and Knevichi.

Lake Springs airfield

The Lake Springs airfield (approximately 2 miles south-west of the main terminal) was designed for aircraft operating on regional routes. It has two hard-surface runways, each 21 metres (69 ft) wide. One is 1,000 metres (3,300 ft) in length and the second is 600 metres (2,000 ft). Currently, it is not used for regularly scheduled flights, and local aviation operates from there, instead.

Knevichi

The Knevichi airfield was designed for all types of aircraft and has two hard surface runways. Each runway is 3,500 metres (11,500 ft) in length and 60 metres (200 ft) in width.

== Airlines and destinations ==
Airlines	Destinations
Aeroflot	Krasnoyarsk–International, Moscow–Sheremetyevo, Saint Petersburg; Seasonal: Bangkok–Suvarnabhumi, Nha Trang, Phuket, Sanya
Air China	Beijing–Capital
Air Koryo	Pyongyang
Aurora	Anadyr, Beijing–Daxing, Chita, Dalian, Dalnegorsk, Harbin, Iturup, Kavalerovo, Khabarovsk, Komsomolsk-on-Amur, Krasnoyarsk–International, Kurilsk, Magadan, Petropavlovsk-Kamchatsky, Plastun, Preobrazheniye, Sovetskaya Gavan, Terney, Ulan-Ude, Yuzhno-Sakhalinsk
Azur Air	Seasonal charter: Nha Trang, Phuket, Pattaya
Cambodia Airways	Macau
Centrum Air	Bukhara, Tashkent
Chengdu Airlines	Changchun, Harbin, Hohhot
China Southern Airlines	Seasonal: Harbin
China United Airlines	Beijing–Daxing
Hainan Airlines	Beijing–Capital, Dalian, Xi'an
IrAero	Blagoveshchensk, Khabarovsk, Neryungri
Juneyao Air	Shanghai–Pudong
Rossiya Airlines	Blagoveshchensk, Harbin, Khabarovsk, Shanghai–Pudong, Yuzhno-Sakhalinsk
S7 Airlines	Beijing–Daxing, Guangzhou, Irkutsk, Khabarovsk, Novosibirsk, Petropavlovsk-Kamchatsky, Shanghai–Pudong, Yakutsk, Yuzhno-Sakhalinsk; Seasonal: Bangkok–Suvarnabhumi, Phuket (begins 25 December 2026)
Ural Airlines	Irkutsk, Yekaterinburg
Uzbekistan Airways	Tashkent
VietJet Air	Seasonal charter: Da Nang, Hanoi, Nha Trang, Phu Quoc
Yakutia Airlines	Ulan-Ude, Yakutsk; Seasonal charter: Qinhuangdao, Yantai, Yichang

== Statistics ==
=== Annual traffic ===
Annual passenger traffic
Year	Passengers	% change
2010	1,263,000	Steady
2011	1,457,000	▲15.4%
2012	1,624,000	▲11.5%
2013	1,853,000	▲14.1%
2014	1,792,000	▼3.3%
2015	1,698,178	▼5.2%
2016	1,850,311	▲9.0%
2017	2,179,000	▲17.8%
2018	2,634,000	▲21.0%
2019	3,080,000	▲16.9%
2020	1,292,500	▼58.0%
2021	1,813,658	▲40.3%
2022	2,118,000	▲16.7%
2023	2,593,000	▲22.4%
2024	2,971,000	▲17.0%

== Transportation ==
=== Rail ===
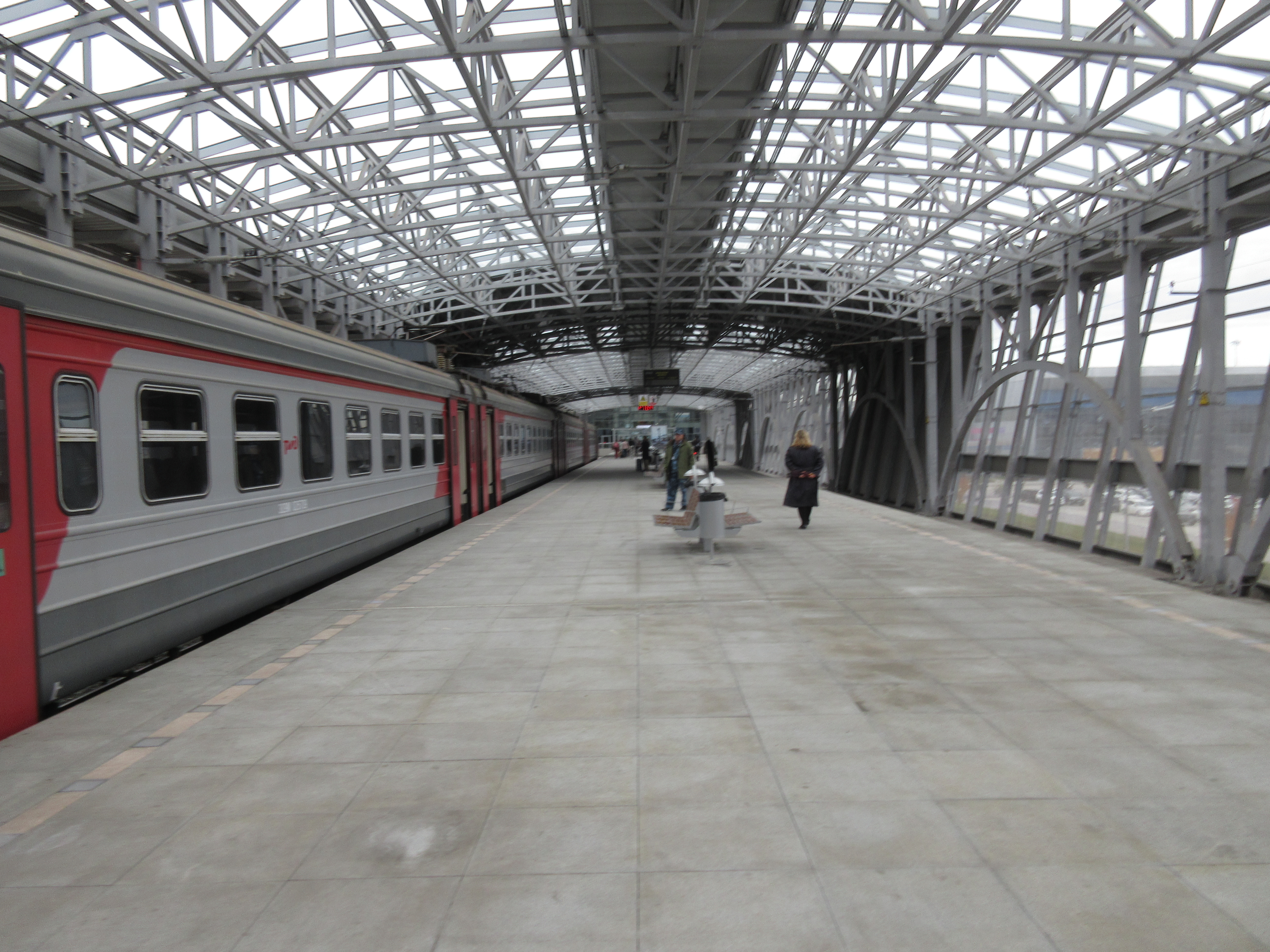
Platform of Knevichi Railway Station

Between 2012 and 2015, Aeroexpress used to go between Vladivostok Railway Station to Knevichi Airport. This was done for the APEC Summit. However, the Aeroexpress did not bring enough demand, running at a constant loss. Additionally, several bus routes offered the ride for significantly lower cost than the express, drawing off some of the visitors who found the rail and taxi fares excessive. In 2015, Aeroexpress shut down its service to the airport, and was replaced by an ordinary commuter express run by the regional commuter rail company "Express Primorya", with reduced cost and frequency to match the demand and save on the expenses of the operator.

== See also ==
- List of the busiest airports in Russia
- List of the busiest airports in the former USSR
