= Aurora (airline) =

Russian airline

- Aurora Airbus A319-100
IATA	ICAO	Call sign
HZ	SHU	AURORA
- Founded: November 2013
- Commenced operations: 8 December 2013
- Operating bases: Khabarovsk Novy Airport; Yuzhno-Sakhalinsk Airport
- Hubs: Vladivostok International Airport
- Fleet size: 19
- Destinations: 32
- Parent company: Sakhalin Region Development Corporation
- Headquarters: Yuzhno-Sakhalinsk, Russia
- Key people: Konstantin Sukhorebrik (CEO)
- Website: flyaurora.ru/en/

Aurora (Russian: Аврора) is a Russian airline headquartered in Yuzhno-Sakhalinsk, Sakhalin Oblast. It operates domestic flights in the Russian Far East region and international flights to and from destinations in China. It is named after the Russian cruiser Aurora. As of June 2025, the airline is banned from flying into the EU like all other Russian airlines.

== History ==
Aurora was created by government order of Russian Prime Minister Dmitry Medvedev in September 2013. Originally called Taiga, it combined Vladivostok Air and SAT Airlines. SAT Airlines and Vladivostok Air served 42 and 15 destinations respectively, and had a combined fleet of 24 fixed-wing aircraft, along with 11 helicopters.

Aurora began operations on 8 December 2013 serving the Khabarovsk – Krasnoyarsk-Yemelyanovo route. The carrier's first aircraft was an Airbus A319-100, with a new aircraft livery. In December 2015, the airline received the first of three Bombardier Q400 aircraft it had on order.

Aurora was 51%-owned by Aeroflot, with the regional government of Sakhalin Oblast holding the balance. An initial investment of RUB 430 million was provided by Aeroflot through a loan. In December 2020, Aeroflot sold its 51% stake in Aurora to Sakhalin Region Development Corporation for ₽1. In 2022, Aurora was merged with five Russian regional airlines, Khabarovsk Airlines, Chukotavia, Kamchatka Air Enterprise, Yakutia Airlines, and Polar Airlines, to create a single far-eastern airline for Russia.

== Key people ==
As of October 2016, Konstantin Sukhorebrik was the CEO.

== Destinations ==
The airline serves two countries on 41 routes.

As of April 2024, Aurora flies internationally from its three bases located in Khabarovsk, Yuzhno-Sakhalinsk and Vladivostok. The international network includes Beijing-Daxing, Harbin and Shanghai-Pudong airports in China.

Country	City	Airport	Status
Russia	Anadyr	Ugolny Airport	
Russia	Blagoveshchensk	Ignatyevo Airport	
Russia	Chita	Kadala Airport	
Russia	Khabarovsk	Khabarovsk Novy Airport	Hub
Russia	Kurilsk	Kurilsk Airport	
Russia	Nogliki	Nogliki Airport	
Russia	Shakhtyorsk	Shakhtyorsk Airport	
Russia	Tynda	Tynda Airport	
Russia	Ulan-Ude	Baikal International Airport	
Russia	Yakutsk	Platon Oyunsky Yakutsk International Airport	
Russia	Yuzhno-Sakhalinsk	Yuzhno-Sakhalinsk Airport	Hub
Russia	Vladivostok	Vladivostok International Airport	Hub
Russia	Zeya	Zeya Airport	
China	Beijing	Beijing Daxing International Airport	
China	Harbin	Harbin Taiping International Airport	
China	Shanghai	Shanghai Pudong International Airport	

=== Codeshare agreements ===
Aurora has codeshare agreements with the following airlines:

- Aeroflot
- Khabarovsk Airlines
- Korean Air
- S7 Airlines
- Yakutia Airlines

== Fleet ==
=== Current fleet ===
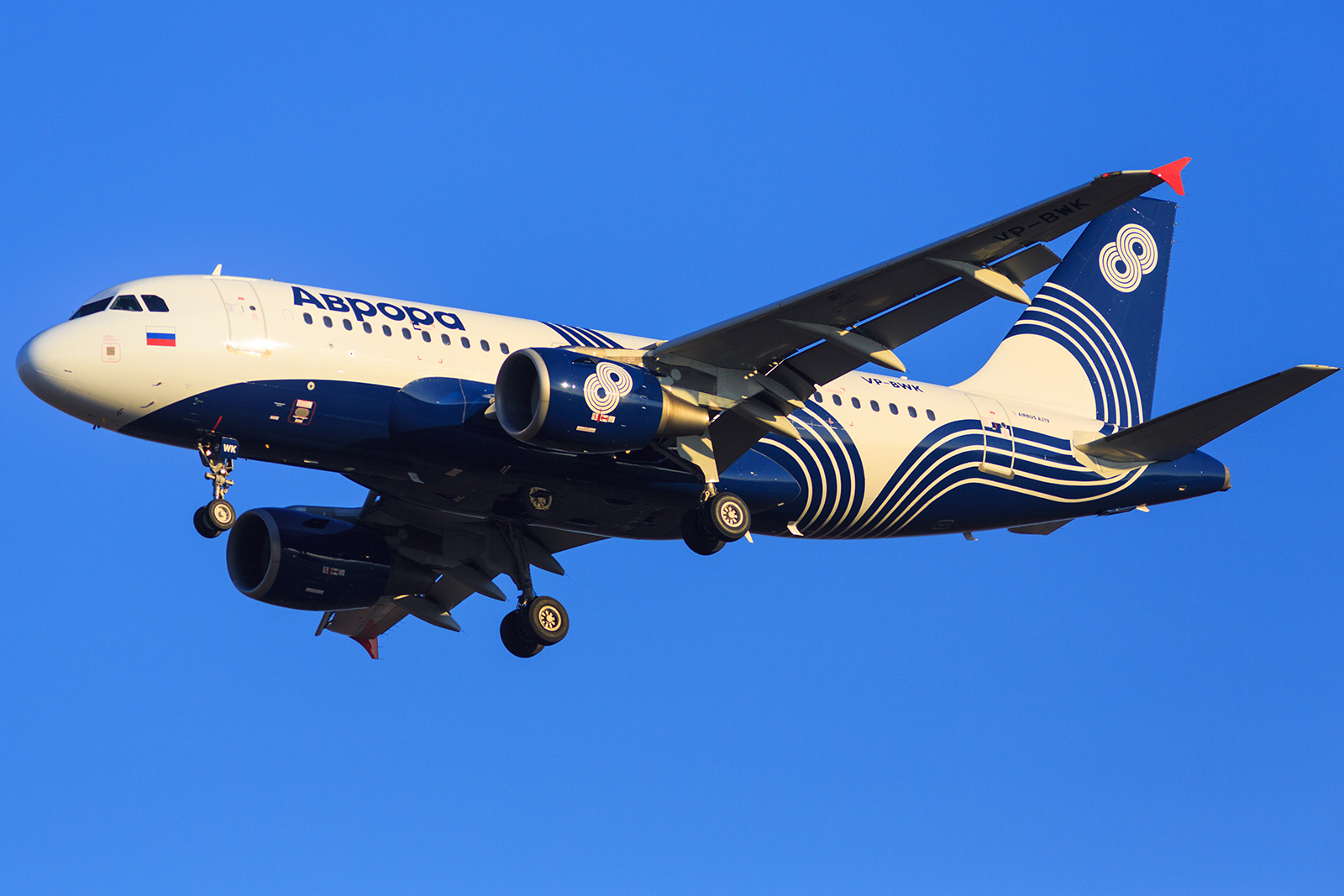
Aurora Airbus A319-100

As of August 2025, Aurora operates the following aircraft:

Aurora fleet
Aircraft	In service	Orders	Passengers	Notes
Airbus A319-100	8	—	128	
Bombardier Dash 8-200	2	—	37	Used on charter flights.
Bombardier Dash 8-300	1	—	50	
Bombardier Dash 8-400	5	—	70	
de Havilland Canada DHC-6-400	3	—	19	
Ilyushin Il-114	—	19	TBA	
Yakovlev SJ-100-95	—	8	87	To be delivered in 2026.
Yakovlev MC-21-310	—	10	TBA	To be delivered from late 2027 to 2030.
Total	19	37		

=== Former fleet ===
Aurora previously operated the following aircraft:

- Antonov AN-24RV
- Boeing 737-200Adv
- Boeing 737-500
- Bombardier Dash 8-100
