= List of S7 Airlines destinations =

S7 Airlines operates the following regular services:

== Destinations ==
Country	City	Airport	Notes	Ref
Armenia	Gyumri	Gyumri Shirak International Airport	Terminated	
Armenia	Yerevan	Zvartnots International Airport		
Austria	Innsbruck	Innsbruck Airport	Terminated	
Austria	Salzburg	Salzburg Airport	Terminated	
Austria	Vienna	Vienna International Airport	Terminated	
Azerbaijan	Baku	Heydar Aliyev International Airport		
Belarus	Homiel	Homiel Airport	Terminated	
Belarus	Minsk	Minsk National Airport	Terminated	
Bulgaria	Burgas	Burgas Airport	Terminated	
Bulgaria	Plovdiv	Plovdiv Airport	Terminated	
Bulgaria	Varna	Varna Airport	Terminated	
China	Beijing	Beijing Capital International Airport	Terminated	
China	Beijing	Beijing Daxing International Airport		
China	Chengdu	Chengdu Tianfu International Airport		
China	Guangzhou	Guangzhou Baiyun International Airport		
China	Sanya	Sanya Phoenix International Airport	Resumes 30 December 2026	
China	Shanghai	Shanghai Pudong International Airport		
China	Ürümqi	Ürümqi Tianshan International Airport	Resumes 29 March 2027	
China	Xi'an	Xi'an Xianyang International Airport		
Croatia	Dubrovnik	Dubrovnik Airport	Terminated	
Croatia	Pula	Pula Airport	Terminated	
Croatia	Split	Split Airport	Terminated	
Croatia	Zadar	Zadar Airport	Terminated	
Cyprus	Larnaca	Larnaca International Airport	Terminated	
Cyprus	Paphos	Paphos International Airport	Terminated	
Czech Republic	Prague	Václav Havel Airport Prague	Terminated	
Denmark	Copenhagen	Copenhagen Airport	Terminated	
Egypt	Hurghada	Hurghada International Airport	Terminated	
Egypt	Marsa Alam	Marsa Alam International Airport	Terminated	
Egypt	Sharm El Sheikh	Sharm El Sheikh International Airport	Terminated	
Finland	Helsinki	Helsinki Airport	Terminated	
France	Chambéry	Chambéry-Savoie Airport	Terminated	
France	Lyon	Lyon–Saint-Exupéry Airport	Terminated	
France	Nice	Nice Côte d'Azur Airport	Terminated	
France	Paris	Orly Airport	Terminated	
Georgia	Batumi	Batumi International Airport	Terminated	
Georgia	Kutaisi	Kutaisi International Airport	Terminated	
Georgia	Tbilisi	Tbilisi International Airport	Terminated	
Germany	Berlin	Berlin Brandenburg Airport	Terminated	
Germany	Berlin	Berlin Tegel Airport	Airport closed	
Germany	Düsseldorf	Düsseldorf Airport	Terminated	
Germany	Frankfurt	Frankfurt Airport	Terminated	
Germany	Munich	Munich Airport	Terminated	
Greece	Athens	Athens International Airport	Terminated	
Greece	Heraklion	Heraklion International Airport	Terminated	
Greece	Kos	Kos International Airport	Terminated	
Greece	Rhodes	Rhodes International Airport	Terminated	
Hong Kong	Hong Kong	Hong Kong International Airport	Terminated	
Iceland	Reykjavík	Keflavík International Airport	Terminated	
Iran	Tehran	Tehran Imam Khomeini International Airport	Terminated	
Ireland	Dublin	Dublin Airport	Terminated	
Israel	Tel Aviv	David Ben Gurion Airport	Terminated	
Italy	Bari	Bari Karol Wojtyła Airport	Terminated	
Italy	Bergamo	Orio al Serio International Airport	Terminated	
Italy	Cagliari	Cagliari Elmas Airport	Terminated	
Italy	Catania	Catania–Fontanarossa Airport	Terminated	
Italy	Genoa	Genoa Cristoforo Colombo Airport	Terminated	
Italy	Milan	Milan Malpensa Airport	Terminated	
Italy	Naples	Naples International Airport	Terminated	
Italy	Olbia	Olbia Costa Smeralda Airport	Terminated	
Italy	Pisa	Pisa International Airport	Terminated	
Italy	Rome	Leonardo da Vinci–Fiumicino Airport	Terminated	
Italy	Turin	Turin Airport	Terminated	
Italy	Verona	Verona Villafranca Airport	Terminated	
Japan	Osaka	Kansai International Airport	Terminated	
Japan	Tokyo	Haneda Airport	Terminated	
Japan	Tokyo	Narita International Airport	Terminated	
Kazakhstan	Almaty	Almaty International Airport		
Kazakhstan	Astana	Nursultan Nazarbayev International Airport		
Kazakhstan	Kökşetau	Kökşetau Airport	Terminated	
Kazakhstan	Oral	Oral Ak Zhol Airport	Terminated	
Kazakhstan	Öskemen	Öskemen Airport		
Kazakhstan	Pavlodar	Pavlodar Airport	Terminated	
Kazakhstan	Qarağandy	Sary-Arka Airport	Terminated	
Kazakhstan	Semey	Semey Airport	Terminated	
Kazakhstan	Şymkent	Şymkent International Airport		
Kazakhstan	Taraz	Taraz Airport	Terminated	
Kyrgyzstan	Bishkek	Manas International Airport		
Kyrgyzstan	Osh	Osh Airport		
Kyrgyzstan	Tamchy	Issyk-Kul International Airport	Seasonal	
Maldives	Malé	Velana International Airport		
Moldova	Chișinău	Chișinău International Airport	Terminated	
Mongolia	Ulaanbaatar	Chinggis Khaan International Airport	Begins 15 December 2026	
Montenegro	Tivat	Tivat Airport	Terminated	
Russia	Abakan	Abakan International Airport		
Russia	Anadyr	Ugolny Airport	Terminated	
Russia	Anapa	Vityazevo Airport	Terminated	
Russia	Arkhangelsk	Vaskovo Airport	Terminated	
Russia	Astrakhan	Narimanovo Airport	Terminated	
Russia	Barnaul	Barnaul Airport		
Russia	Belgorod	Belgorod International Airport	Terminated	
Russia	Beloyarsk	Beloyarsk Airport	Terminated	
Russia	Blagoveshchensk	Ignatyevo Airport		
Russia	Bratsk	Bratsk Airport		
Russia	Bryansk	Bryansk International Airport	Terminated	
Russia	Cheboksary	Cheboksary International Airport		
Russia	Chelyabinsk	Chelyabinsk Airport		
Russia	Chita	Chita-Kadala International Airport		
Russia	Gelendzhik	Gelendzhik Airport	Terminated	
Russia	Gorno-Altaysk	Gorno-Altaysk Airport		
Russia	Grozny	Kadyrov Grozny International Airport	Terminated	
Russia	Irkutsk	International Airport Irkutsk	Focus city	
Russia	Izhevsk	Izhevsk Airport		
Russia	Kazan	Kazan International Airport		
Russia	Kaliningrad	Khrabrovo Airport		
Russia	Kaluga	Kaluga (Grabtsevo) Airport	Terminated	
Russia	Kemerovo	Kemerovo International Airport		
Russia	Khabarovsk	Khabarovsk Novy Airport		
Russia	Khanty-Mansiysk	Khanty-Mansiysk Airport		
Russia	Kirovsk / Apatity	Kirovsk–Apatity Airport	Seasonal	
Russia	Kogalym	Kogalym Airport	Terminated	
Russia	Krasnodar	Krasnodar International Airport		
Russia	Krasnoyarsk	Krasnoyarsk International Airport		
Russia	Komsomolsk-on-Amur	Komsomolsk-on-Amur Airport	Terminated	
Russia	Lipetsk	Lipetsk Airport	Terminated	
Russia	Magadan	Sokol Airport		
Russia	Magnitogorsk	Magnitogorsk Airport	Terminated	
Russia	Mineralnye Vody	Mineralnye Vody Airport		
Russia	Mirny	Mirny Airport		
Russia	Moscow	Moscow Domodedovo Airport	Hub	
Russia	Moscow	Sheremetyevo International Airport	Terminated	
Russia	Moscow	Vnukovo International Airport	Terminated	
Russia	Murmansk	Murmansk Airport	Terminated	
Russia	Nadym	Nadym Airport		
Russia	Neryungri	Chulman Airport		
Russia	Nizhnekamsk	Begishevo Airport	Terminated	
Russia	Nizhnevartovsk	Nizhnevartovsk Airport		
Russia	Nizhny Novgorod	Strigino International Airport		
Russia	Norilsk	Alykel Airport		
Russia	Novokuznetsk	Spichenkovo Airport		
Russia	Novosibirsk	Tolmachevo International Airport	Hub	
Russia	Novy Urengoy	Novy Urengoy Airport		
Russia	Noyabrsk	Noyabrsk Airport		
Russia	Omsk	Omsk Tsentralny Airport		
Russia	Orenburg	Orenburg Tsentralny Airport	Terminated	
Russia	Penza	Penza Vissarion Belinsky Airport	Terminated	
Russia	Perm	Bolshoye Savino Airport		
Russia	Petropavlovsk-Kamchatsky	Petropavlovsk-Kamchatsky Airport		
Russia	Petrozavodsk	Besovets Airport	Terminated	
Russia	Rostov-on-Don	Platov International Airport	Terminated	
Russia	Rostov-on-Don	Rostov-on-Don Airport	Airport closed	
Russia	Saint Petersburg	Pulkovo Airport	Focus city	
Russia	Salekhard	Salekhard Airport		
Russia	Samara	Kurumoch International Airport		
Russia	Saransk	Saransk Airport	Terminated	
Russia	Saratov	Saratov Gagarin Airport		
Russia	Saratov	Saratov Tsentralny Airport	Airport closed	
Russia	Sochi	Sochi International Airport		
Russia	Stavropol	Stavropol Shpakovskoye Airport	Terminated	
Russia	Surgut	Farman Salmanov Surgut Airport		
Russia	Talakan	Talakan Airport		
Russia	Tomsk	Tomsk Kamov Airport		
Russia	Tyumen	Roshchino International Airport		
Russia	Ufa	Ufa International Airport		
Russia	Ulan-Ude	Baikal International Airport		
Russia	Ulyanovsk	Ulyanovsk Baratayevka Airport		
Russia	Ust-Kut	Ust-Kut Airport	Begins 1 December 2026	
Russia	Vladikavkaz	Beslan Airport		
Russia	Vladivostok	Vladivostok International Airport	Focus city	
Russia	Volgograd	Volgograd International Airport		
Russia	Voronezh	Voronezh International Airport	Terminated	
Russia	Yakutsk	Platon Oyunsky Yakutsk International Airport		
Russia	Yaroslavl	Tunoshna Airport	Terminated	
Russia	Yekaterinburg	Koltsovo International Airport		
Russia	Yuzhno-Sakhalinsk	Yuzhno-Sakhalinsk Airport		
Russia / Ukraine (Note: Disputed. See Annexation of Crimea by the Russian Federation.)	Simferopol	Simferopol International Airport	Terminated	
South Korea	Seoul	Incheon International Airport	Terminated	
Spain	Alicante	Alicante–Elche Miguel Hernández Airport	Terminated	
Spain	Barcelona	Josep Tarradellas Barcelona–El Prat Airport	Terminated	
Spain	Ibiza	Ibiza Airport	Terminated	
Spain	Madrid	Madrid–Barajas Airport	Terminated	
Spain	Málaga	Málaga Airport	Terminated	
Spain	Palma de Mallorca	Palma de Mallorca Airport	Terminated	
Spain	Tenerife	Tenerife South Airport	Terminated	
Spain	Valencia	Valencia Airport	Terminated	
Sri Lanka	Colombo	Bandaranaike International Airport	Begins 20 December 2026	
Sweden	Stockholm	Stockholm Arlanda Airport	Terminated	
Switzerland	Geneva	Geneva Airport	Terminated	
Taiwan	Taipei	Taoyuan International Airport	Terminated	
Tajikistan	Dushanbe	Dushanbe International Airport		
Tajikistan	Khujand	Khujand Airport		
Tajikistan	Kulob	Kulob Airport	Terminated	
Thailand	Bangkok	Suvarnabhumi Airport		
Thailand	Pattaya	U-Tapao International Airport	Terminated	
Thailand	Phuket	Phuket International Airport	Seasonal	
Turkey	Antalya	Antalya Airport		
Turkey	Dalaman	Dalaman Airport	Terminated	
Turkey	Istanbul	Atatürk Airport	Airport closed	
Turkey	Istanbul	Istanbul Airport		
Turkmenistan	Aşgabat	Aşgabat International Airport		
Turkmenistan	Daşoguz	Daşoguz Airport	Terminated	
Turkmenistan	Türkmenbaşy	Türkmenbaşy International Airport	Terminated	
Ukraine	Kyiv	Boryspil International Airport	Terminated	
Ukraine	Odesa	Odesa International Airport	Terminated	
United Arab Emirates	Dubai	Al Maktoum International Airport	Suspended	
United Arab Emirates	Dubai	Dubai International Airport	Suspended	
Uzbekistan	Andizhan	Andizhan Airport		
Uzbekistan	Bukhara	Bukhara International Airport	Terminated	
Uzbekistan	Fergana	Fergana International Airport		
Uzbekistan	Namangan	Namangan Airport	Terminated	
Uzbekistan	Samarqand	Samarqand International Airport		
Uzbekistan	Tashkent	Islam Karimov Tashkent International Airport		
Uzbekistan	Urgench	Urgench International Airport		
Vietnam	Da Nang	Da Nang International Airport	Begins 2 March 2027	
Vietnam	Ho Chi Minh City	Tan Son Nhat International Airport	Terminated	
Vietnam	Nha Trang	Cam Ranh International Airport	Terminated	
