= KrasAvia =

Russian airline

IATA	ICAO	Call sign
KV	SSJ	SIBERIAN SKY
- Founded: 1956 (as part of Aeroflot); 1992 (became independent as KrasAvia)
- Hubs: Krasnoyarsk-Yemelyanovo; Krasnoyarsk-Cheremshanka
- Fleet size: 14
- Destinations: 35
- Headquarters: Krasnoyarsk, Russia
- Key people: Valeriy Mordan (CEO)
- Website: krasavia.ru

KrasAvia is a scheduled and charter passenger airline based in Krasnoyarsk, Russia. It was established in 1956 as Turin Airline before being renamed Evenkia Avia in 2002 and KrasAvia in 2007. It is Russia's largest regional carrier, with a fleet of 44 aircraft and helicopters. The airline is owned by the administration of the Krasnoyarsk region. It is currently banned from flying into EU airspace.

== Destinations ==
As of May 2025 KrasAvia serves following destinations:

Country	Region	City	Airport	Notes	Refs
Mongolia		Ulaanbaatar	Chinggis Khaan International Airport		
Russia	Altai	Gorno-Altaysk	Gorno-Altaysk Airport		
Russia	Altai Krai	Barnaul	Barnaul Airport		
Russia	Buryatia	Nizhneangarsk	Nizhneangarsk Airport		
Russia	Buryatia	Taksimo	Taksimo Airport		
Russia	Buryatia	Ulan-Ude	Baikal International Airport		
Russia	Kemerovo Oblast	Kemerovo	Alexei Leonov Kemerovo International Airport		
Russia	Kemerovo Oblast	Novokuznetsk	Spichenkovo Airport		
Russia	Khakassia	Abakan	Abakan Airport		
Russia	Krasnoyarsk Krai	Baykit	Baykit Airport		
Russia	Krasnoyarsk Krai	Boguchany	Boguchany Airport		
Russia	Krasnoyarsk Krai	Bor	Podkamennaya Tunguska Airport		
Russia	Krasnoyarsk Krai	Dikson	Dikson Airport		
Russia	Krasnoyarsk Krai	Igarka	Igarka Airport		
Russia	Krasnoyarsk Krai	Khatanga	Khatanga Airport		
Russia	Krasnoyarsk Krai	Kodinsk	Kodinsk Airport		
Russia	Krasnoyarsk Krai	Krasnoyarsk	Krasnoyarsk Cheremshanka Airport	Secondary hub	
Russia	Krasnoyarsk Krai	Krasnoyarsk	Krasnoyarsk International Airport	Hub	
Russia	Krasnoyarsk Krai	Motygino	Motygino Airport		
Russia	Krasnoyarsk Krai	Norilsk	Alykel Airport		
Russia	Krasnoyarsk Krai	Severo-Yeniseysk	Severo-Yeniseysk Airport		
Russia	Krasnoyarsk Krai	Svetlogorsk	Svetlogorsk Airport		
Russia	Krasnoyarsk Krai	Tura	Tura Airport		
Russia	Krasnoyarsk Krai	Turukhansk	Turukhansk Airport		
Russia	Krasnoyarsk Krai	Vanavara	Vanavara Airport		
Russia	Krasnoyarsk Krai	Yartsevo	Yartsevo Airport		
Russia	Sakha	Lensk	Lensk Airport		
Russia	Sakha	Olyokminsk	Olyokminsk Airport		
Russia	Sakha	Talakan	Talakan Airport		
Russia	Sakha	Udachny	Polyarny Airport	Seasonal	
Russia	Tomsk Oblast	Strezhevoy	Strezhevoy Airport		
Russia	Tomsk Oblast	Tomsk	Tomsk Kamov Airport		
Russia	Tuva	Kyzyl	Kyzyl Airport		
Russia	Khanty-Mansi Autonomous Okrug	Nizhnevartovsk	Nizhnevartovsk Airport		
Russia	Zabaykalsky Krai	Chara	Chara Airport		

== Fleet ==
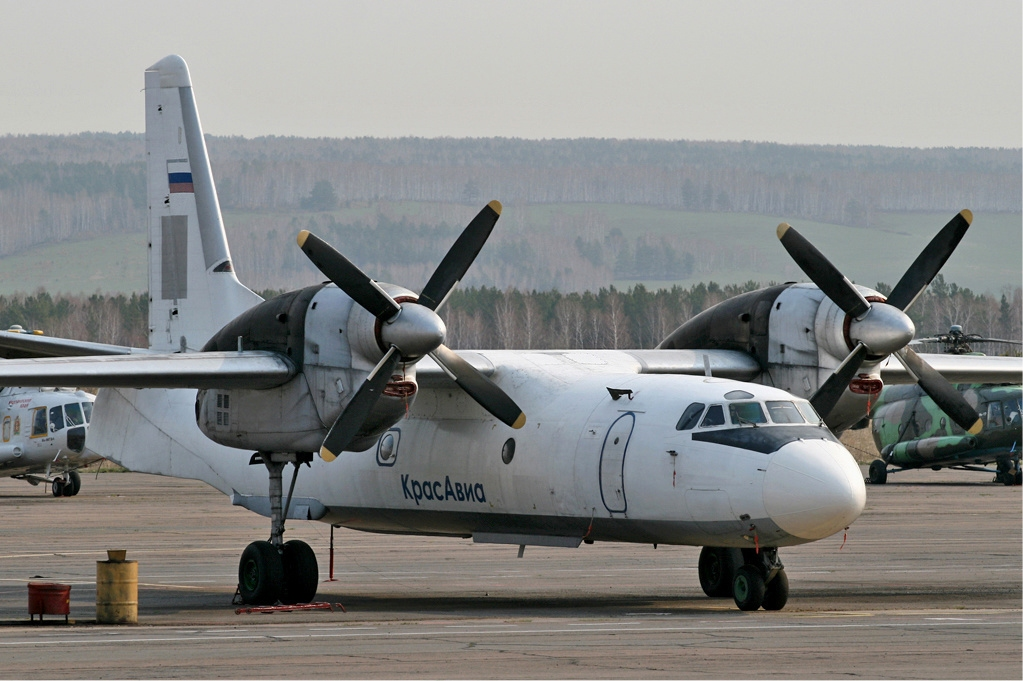
KrasAvia Antonov Antonov An-32

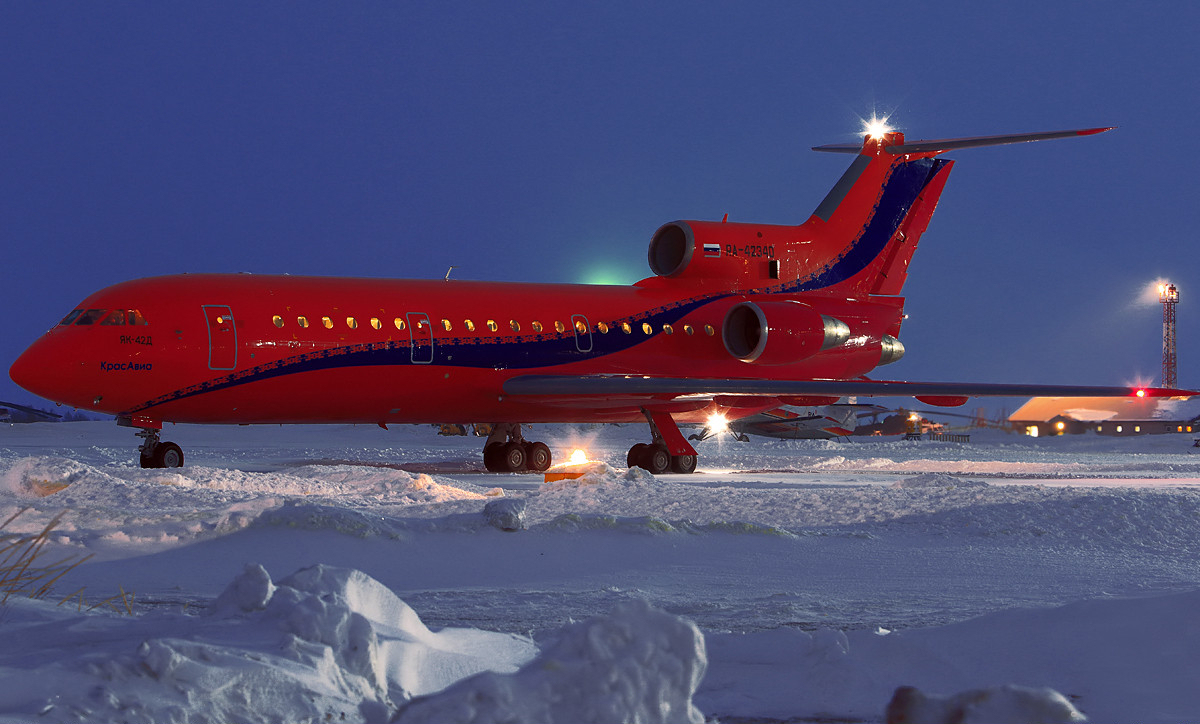
KrasAvia Yakovlev Yak-42

=== Current fleet ===
As of August 2025, KrasAvia operates the following aircraft:

Aircraft type	Active	Notes
ATR 42–500	4	
ATR 72–500	2	To replace Antonov An-24/Antonov An-26; First foreign-built aircraft
Yakovlev Yak-42D	8	

=== Former fleet ===
The airline previously operated the following aircraft:

- 1 Antonov An-26-100
- 2 Antonov An-24RV
- 3 Antonov An-26B
- 2 Let L-410
- 18 Mil Mi-8T, Mil Mi-17
