= Boguchany =

Boguchany may refer to:

- Boguchany (rural locality), a rural locality (selo) in Krasnoyarsk Krai, Russia
- Boguchany Airport, an airport near that village
- Boguchany hydroelectric power station
