= Dikson Airport =

Airport in Dikson, Krasnoyarsk Krai, Russia

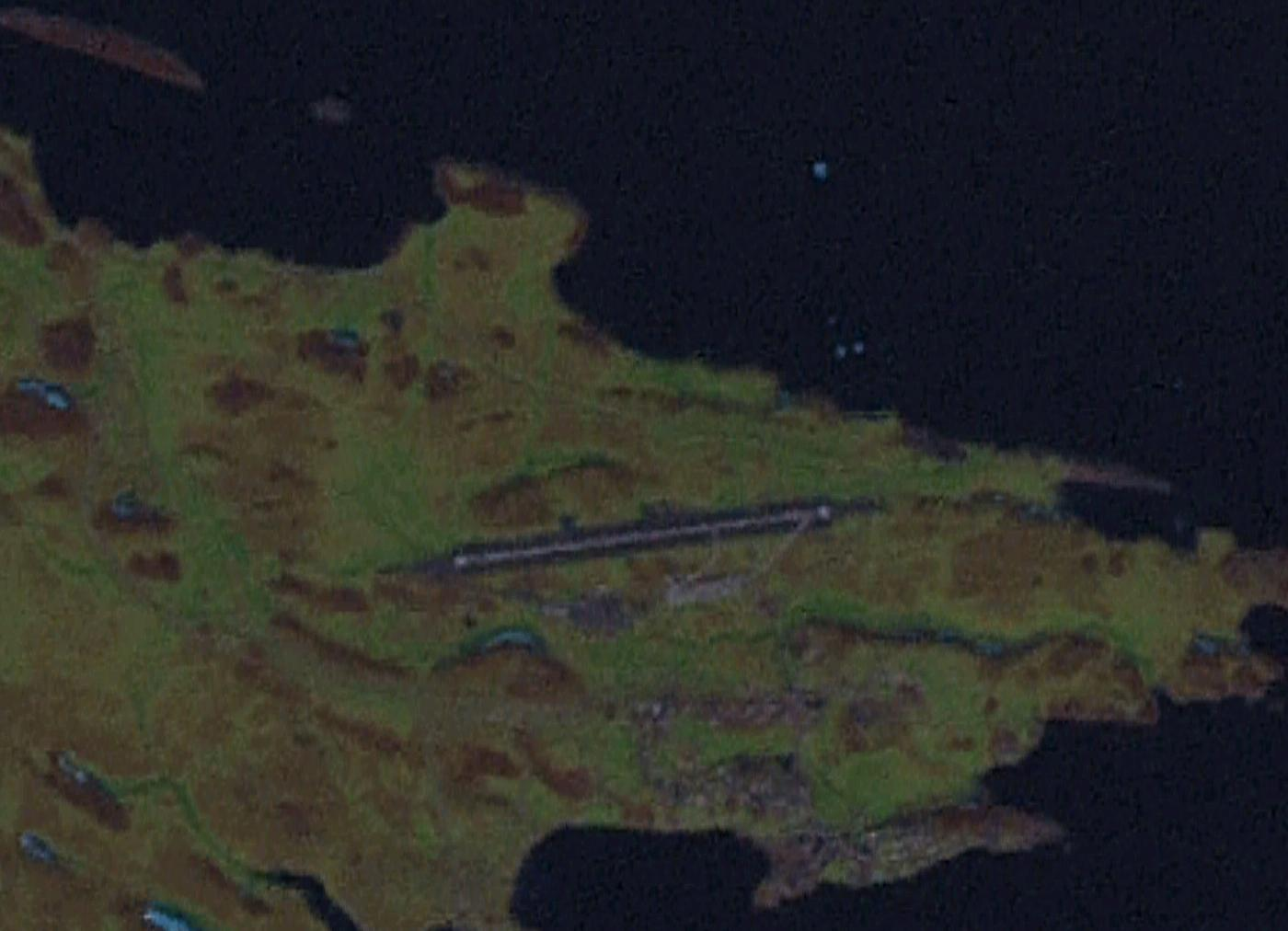
- IATA: DKS; ICAO: UODD

Summary
- Airport type: Public
- Owner: KrasAvia
- Operator: Krasnoarye Airports
- Location: Dikson (urban-type settlement)
- Elevation AMSL: 47 ft / 14 m
- Coordinates: 73°31′0″N 80°22′54″E
- Website: Dikson.kras.aero

Map
- Location of Dikson Airport in Russia

Runways
| Direction | Length | | Surface |
| Direction | ft | m | Surface |
|---|---|---|---|
| 06/24 | 4,921 | 1,500 | Concrete |

Dikson Airport (Russian: Аэропорт Диксон) (IATA: DKS, ICAO: UODD) is a commercial airport in Russia, on an island 5 km (3.1 mi) west of the urban-type settlement of Dikson. The airport is owned by KrasAvia. It primarily services small transport aircraft. Central Intelligence Agency reports from 1952 released under the Freedom of Information Act indicate that the USSR was using Dikson as a staging airfield for Tupolev Tu-4 aircraft.

== Airlines and destinations ==
| Airlines | Destinations |
|---|---|
| KrasAvia | Krasnoyarsk-International, Norilsk |

== See also ==
- List of airports in Russia
