= Krasnoyarsk Cheremshanka Airport =

Airport in Krasnoyarsk Krai, Russia

Cheremshanka Airport Аэропорт Черемшанка

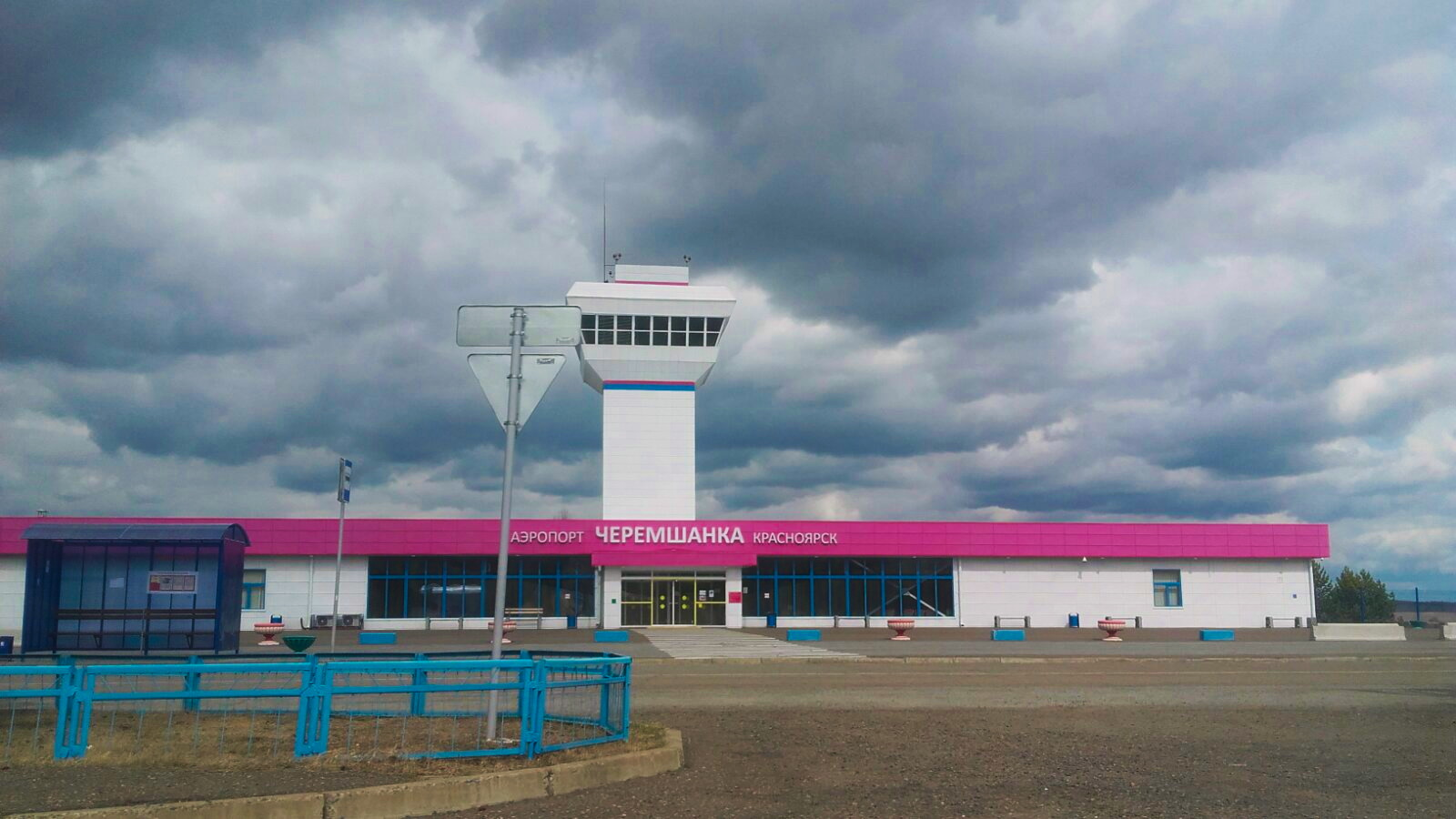
- IATA: KCY; ICAO: UNKM

Summary
- Airport type: Public/Military
- Operator: KrasAviaPort
- Serves: Krasnoyarsk
- Location: Krasnoyarsk
- Elevation AMSL: 942 ft (287 m)
- Coordinates: 56°10′33″N 92°32′34″E
- Website: KrasAviaPort.ru
- Interactive map of Cheremshanka Airport

Runways
| Direction | Length | | Surface |
| Direction | m | ft | Surface |
|---|---|---|---|
| 11/29 | 1,793 | 5,884 | Concrete |

Krasnoyarsk Cheremshanka Airport (Russian: Красноярский аэропорт Черемшанка) (IATA: KCY, ICAO: UNKM) is a domestic airport in the Krasnoyarsk Krai, situated 23 kilometres (14 mi) northwest of Krasnoyarsk. It became the base of a civil defense helicopter detachment in 1982, featuring Mil Mi-6 and Mil Mi-8 aircraft. In addition to military use, the airfield serves some regional civilian passenger flights using Antonov An-24 and Antonov An-26 aircraft. It is the hub of KrasAvia airline. Krasnoyarsk Cheremshanka is adjacent to the larger Krasnoyarsk International Airport and appears very similar to it from the air, since its two runways, although shorter than those at the international airport, have exactly the same bearings (11/29).

== 2011 fire ==
On 19 December 2011, a fire broke out at the Cheremshanka airport which destroyed the terminal building and the air traffic control tower. About 100 firefighters and 38 vehicles managed to extinguish the fire some four hours after the alert. No injuries occurred, and no passengers were in the terminal building (capacity 500 passengers) when the fire broke out. The reason for the fire is under investigation.

== Passenger Terminal ==
After the destruction of the original terminal by fire, passengers were served at a temporary terminal made from the previous cargo terminal. The destroyed terminal was reconstructed and enlarged to accommodate 30 flights a day. The new passenger terminal was opened in June 2018. The terminal serves regional flights only.

== Airlines and destinations ==
Krasnoyarsk Cheremshanka Airport offers flights to the following destinations:

| Airlines | Destinations |
|---|---|
| KrasAvia | Abakan, Barnaul, Baykit, Boguchany, Kodinsk, Motygino, Noyabrsk, Svetlogorsk, Tura, Vanavara; Seasonal: Polyarany |

== Incidents and accidents ==
- On 3 September 2025, a transport Il-76 performed an emergency landing at Cheremshanka Airport due to engine malfunction and suffered a runway excursion. No casualties have been reported.

== See also ==
- List of airports in Russia
