= Gorno-Altaysk Airport =

Airport in Gorno-Altaysk, Altai Republic, Russia

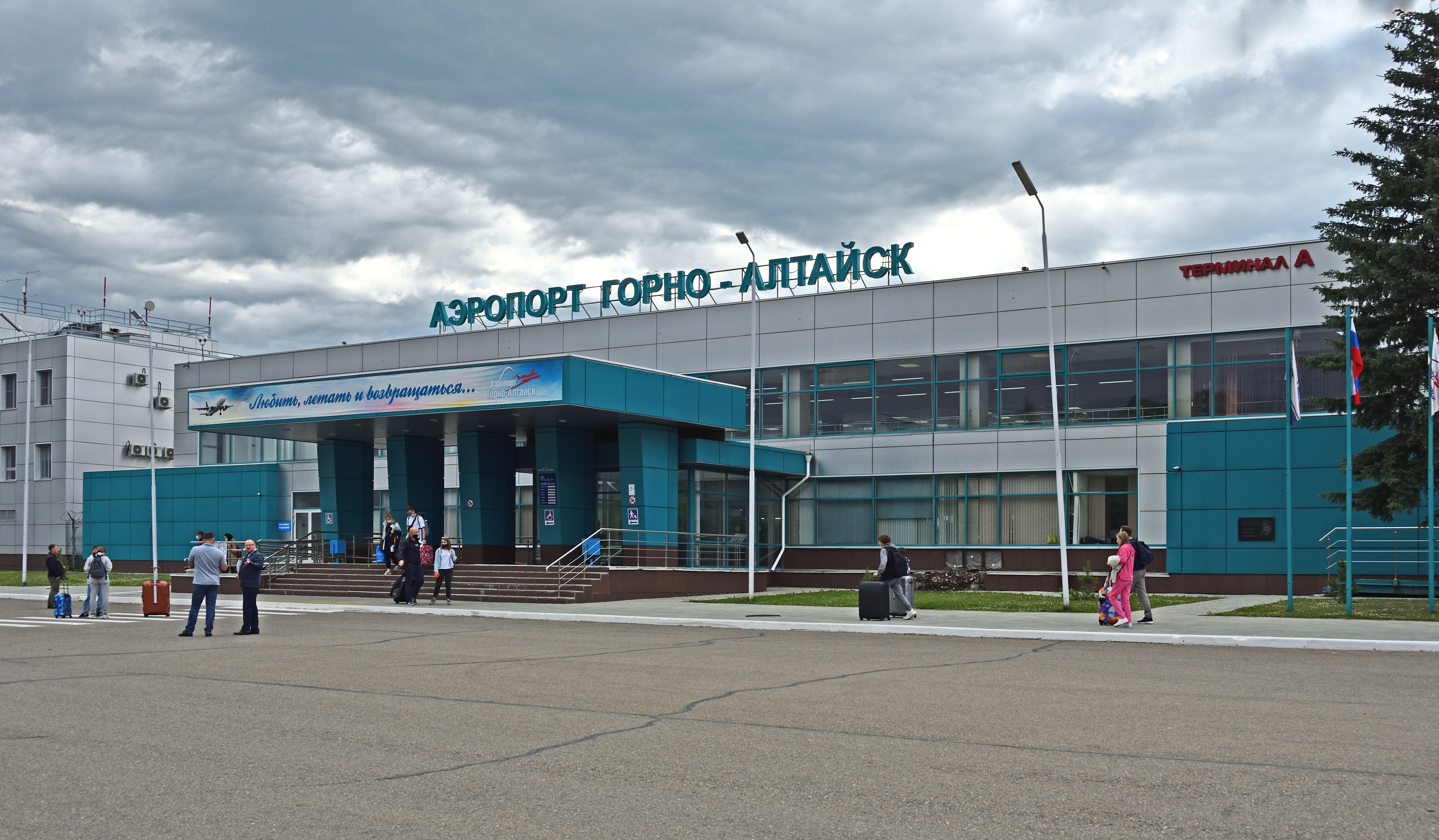
- IATA: RGK; ICAO: UNBG

Summary
- Airport type: Public
- Operator: JSC Gorno-Altayk Airport
- Serves: Gorno-Altaysk
- Location: Gorno-Altaysk, Altai Republic
- Elevation AMSL: 968 ft (295 m)
- Coordinates: 51°58′0″N 85°50′0″E
- Website: rgk-aero.ru
- Interactive map of Gorno-Altaysk Airport

Runways
Direction	Length		Surface
Direction	ft	m	Surface
02/20	7,546	2,300	Asphalt

Gorno-Altaysk Airport (Altay: Горно-Алтайск Аэропорт, Russian: Аэропорт Горно-Алтайск) (IATA: RGK, ICAO: UNBG) is the international airport in Russia located 9 km west of Gorno-Altaysk. It services small airliners. In 2019, 102,338 passengers passed through this airport.

== New terminal and new runway ==
In 2011, the construction of a new terminal and a new and modern runway, for accepting larger aircraft, was finished. The new terminal and runway were first tested by an Airbus A319 completing a S7 Airlines flight to Novosibirsk.

== Airlines and destinations ==
Airlines	Destinations
Aeroflot	Moscow-Sheremetyevo
azimuth	Seasonal: Ufa
IrAero	Seasonal: Chita
KrasAvia	Krasnoyarsk–International, Ulan-Ude; Seasonal: Krasnoyarsk–Cheremshanka
Nordwind Airlines	Seasonal: Kazan, Saint Petersburg
Red Wings Airlines	Yekaterinburg
Rossiya Airlines	Saint Petersburg
S7 Airlines	Irkutsk, Krasnoyarsk-International, Moscow–Domodedovo, Novosibirsk, Saint Petersburg (begins 31 July 2026)
Utair	Surgut
UVT Aero	Kazan, Orenburg, Perm, Ulan-Ude

== See also ==
- List of airports in Russia
- List of the busiest airports in Russia
- List of the busiest airports in the former Soviet Union
