= Vanavara Airport =

Airport in Vanavara, Russia

- IATA: VAQ; ICAO: UNIW

Summary
- Airport type: Public
- Location: Vanavara
- Elevation AMSL: 272 m / 892 ft
- Coordinates: 60°21′18″N 102°18′36″E
- Interactive map of Vanavara Airport

Runways
Direction	Length		Surface
Direction	m	ft	Surface
06/24	1,400	4,593	Concrete

Vanavara Airport (ICAO: UNIW) is an airport in Russia located 2 km northeast of Vanavara. It is a civilian airport with a well-maintained concrete runway and a utilitarian transport layout. The airport was first opened in 1948. The forest clearway is cleared out to 3 km, suggesting that the runway length may have been longer decades ago. A nearby airport is Aksenovo Airport.

== Airlines and destinations ==
Airlines	Destinations
Azur Air	Krasnoyarsk–Cheremshanka
KrasAvia	Krasnoyarsk–Cheremshanka
NordStar	Krasnoyarsk–Yemelyanovo

== See also ==
- List of airports in Russia
