= Krasnoyarsk International Airport =

Airport in Krasnoyarsk Krai, Russia

Krasnoyarsk International Airport Международный аэропорт Красноярск
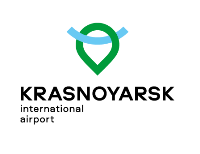

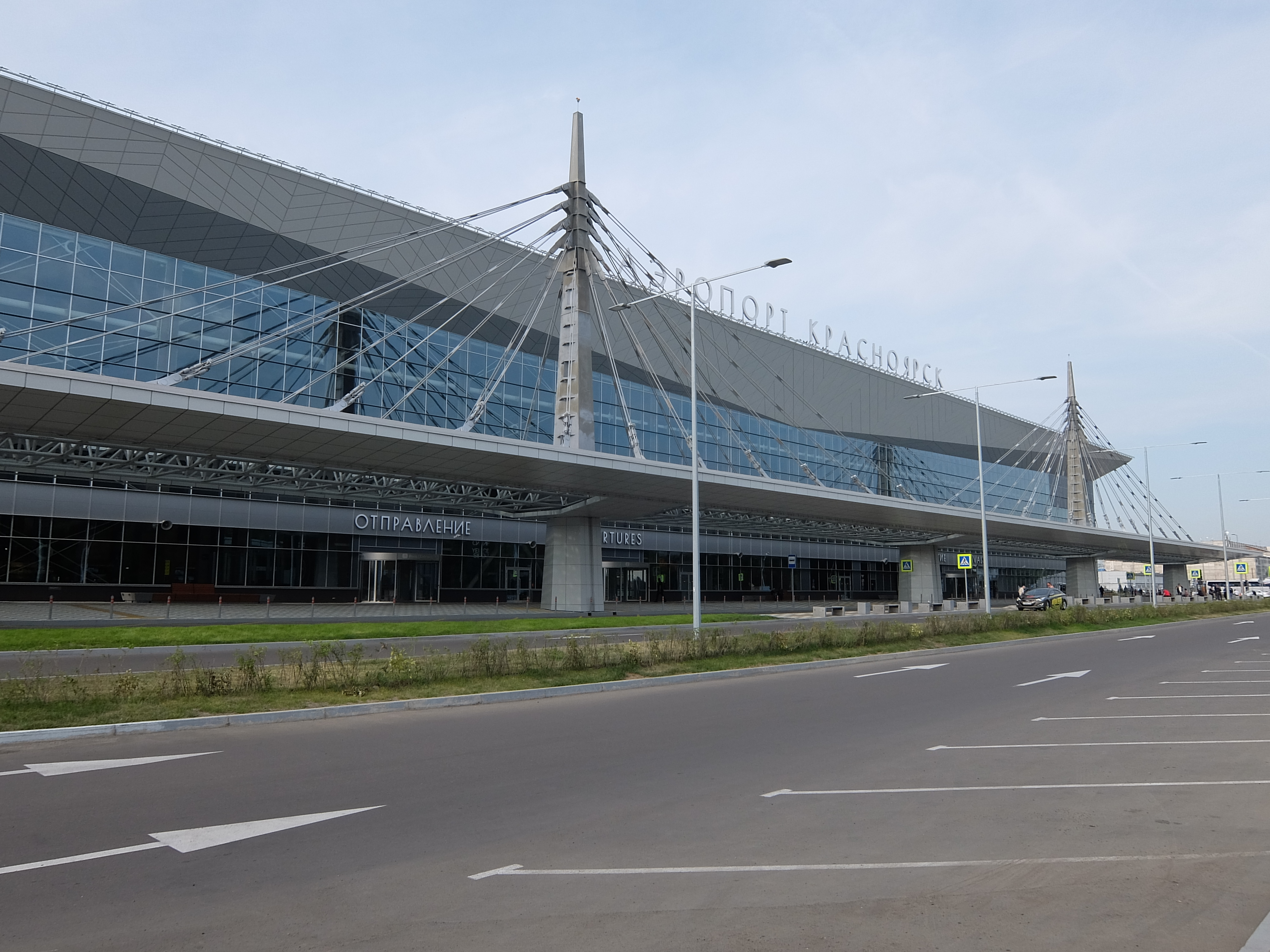
- IATA: KJA; ICAO: UNKL

Summary
- Airport type: Public
- Serves: Krasnoyarsk, Russia
- Hub for: KrasAvia; NordStar; Rossiya Airlines
- Focus city for: AirBridge Cargo; Azur Air; IrAero; Pegas Fly; S7 Airlines; Ural Airlines
- Elevation AMSL: 942 ft (287 m)
- Coordinates: 56°10′18″N 92°29′36″E
- Website: kja.aero

Map
- Location of airport in Krasnoyarsk Krai KJA (Russia)

Runways
Direction	Length		Surface
Direction	m	ft	Surface
11/29	3,700	12,139	Concrete

Statistics (2018)
- Passengers: 2,587,734 ▲
- Cargo: 16,800 tonnes
- Source: Krasnoyarsk International Airport

Krasnoyarsk International Airport (Russian: Международный аэропорт Красноярск, romanized: Mezhdunarodnyy aeroport Krasnoyarsk) (IATA: KJA, ICAO: UNKL), is a major airport in Krasnoyarsk Krai, Russia, 27 kilometres (17 mi) northwest of Krasnoyarsk. With 4.3 million passengers in 2025 it is the 2nd busiest airport in Siberia (after Novosibirsk Tolmachevo Airport), 12th largest airport in Russia as well as the 21st-busiest in the Post-Soviet states.

== History ==
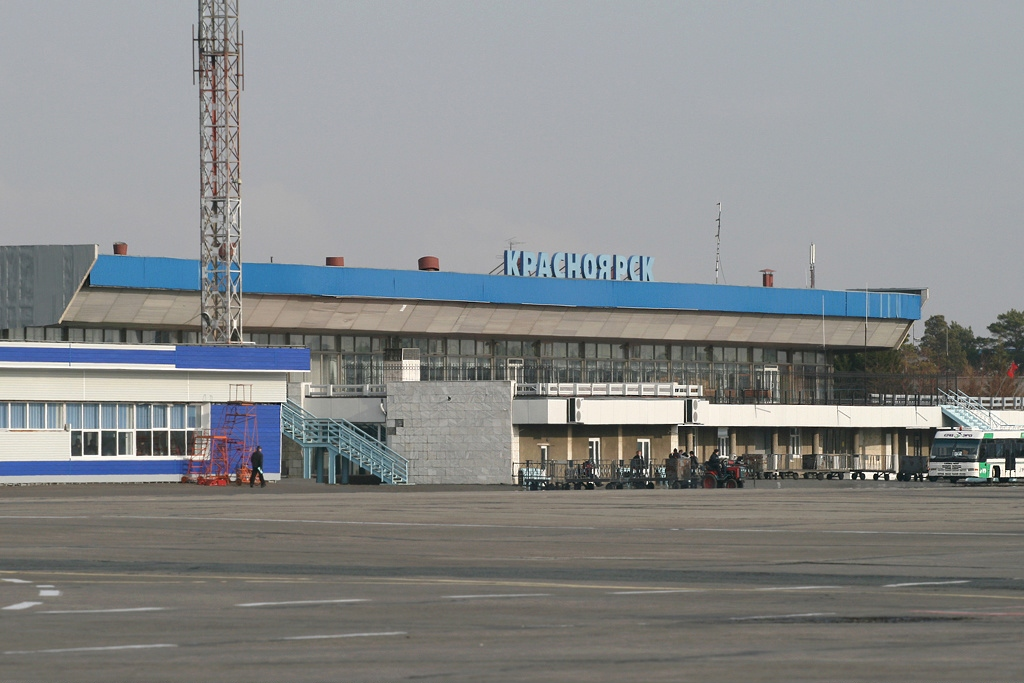
Currently inactive, old terminal 1

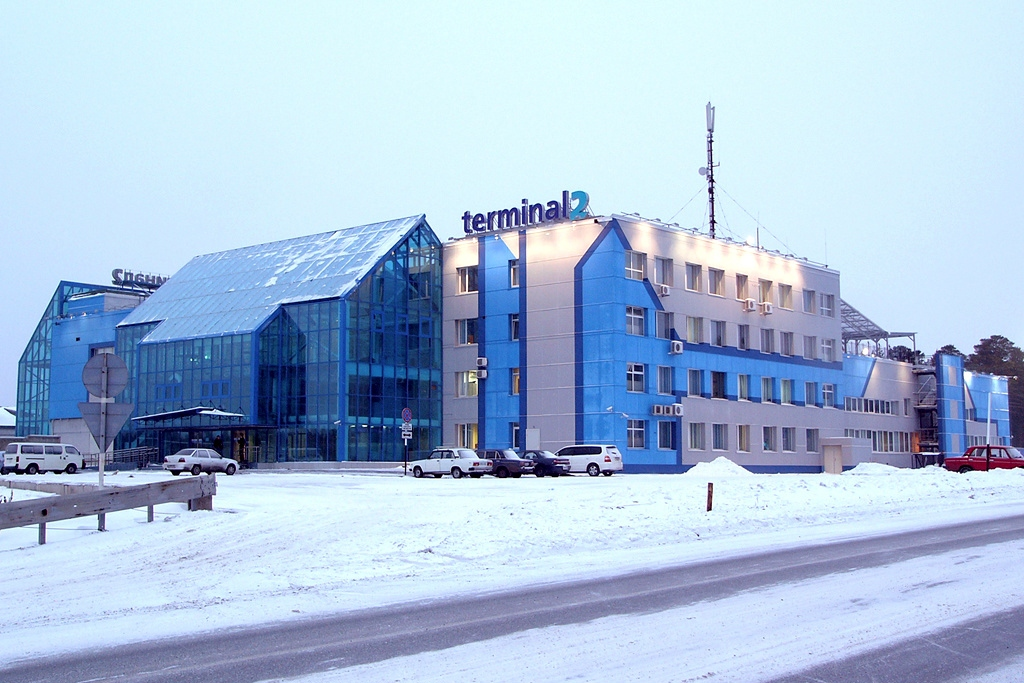
Currently inactive terminal 2

Construction of the airport started in 1970. It opened for operations in 1980.

In 2005, the airport launched Terminal 2 for handling transit and international passengers. By 2006, the old runway coating had been replaced by an asphalt-concrete layer with reinforced polymeric netting.

In November 2007, it was announced that Lufthansa Cargo might switch its Asian refueling and distribution point from Astana, Kazakhstan, to Krasnoyarsk (Yemelyanovo) International Airport, because Russia would no longer permit Lufthansa the use of its air space for their Europe to Asia flights unless they could sell fuel. In July 2008, Lufthansa stated that it would move its cargo logistics hub from Astana to Krasnoyarsk (Yemelyanovo) once the airport was brought up to ICAO safety standards. The cargo terminal of Lufthansa Cargo in Krasnoyarsk (Yemelyanovo) airport was its second largest one after Frankfurt. However, in October 2016, Lufthansa Cargo switched all flights from Krasnoyarsk (Yemelyanovo) to another Siberian airport Tolmachevo (Novosibirsk) citing its better infrastructure and the ability to outsource certain services whereas in Krasnoyarsk the company “had to involve its own personnel and equipment”. On the other hand, AirBridgeCargo Airlines switched its activities vice versa from Tolmachevo Airport to Yemelyanovo in January 2018.

In 2008, the modern arrivals terminal with the capacity of 750 passengers per hour was opened. Also in 2008, the lighting facilities were reconstructed and the new hi-intensity lighting system was installed: the centerline lights and the touchdown zone lights. In 2011, the airport handled over 1.6 million passengers, a 28% increase over 2010.

In November 2017, the general director of the airport announced that the airport will now be called Krasnoyarsk-International, instead of Krasnoyarsk-Yemelyanovo. It is unknown if the airport has as yet been officially renamed.

Before 2019, RZD made a decision to construct a railway line to the airport, but due to escape of high ticket price and small train occupancy, this will not be an Aeroexpress route, this will be a simple commuter service. Nevertheless, the route will also serve cargo trains, to deliver air-cargo goods directly to Krasnoyarsk.

In March 2019, Aeroflot signed an agreement with the government of the Krasnoyarsk region and Yemelyanovo Airport to create a local international hub. The project will start in 2020. On 31 May 2021, Aeroflot officially commenced its hub operation in Krasnoyarsk.

== Location ==
Krasnoyarsk Yemelyanovo's location is an unusual case, as the airfield is located right next to a smaller airfield, Cheremshanka. The reason this is unusual and slightly problematic is that since Cheremshanka is right next to the airfield, it can be easily confused for Yemelyanovo, and what adds to the location issue is the fact that both airfields share their runway bearings - 11/29 - with each other. This, as a result, makes the two airports look like one, which is especially problematic as the only way to distinguish the two is the runway lengths - Cheremshanka has a shorter runway than Yemelyanovo - and the fact that no taxiway connects the two airfields.

== Facilities ==
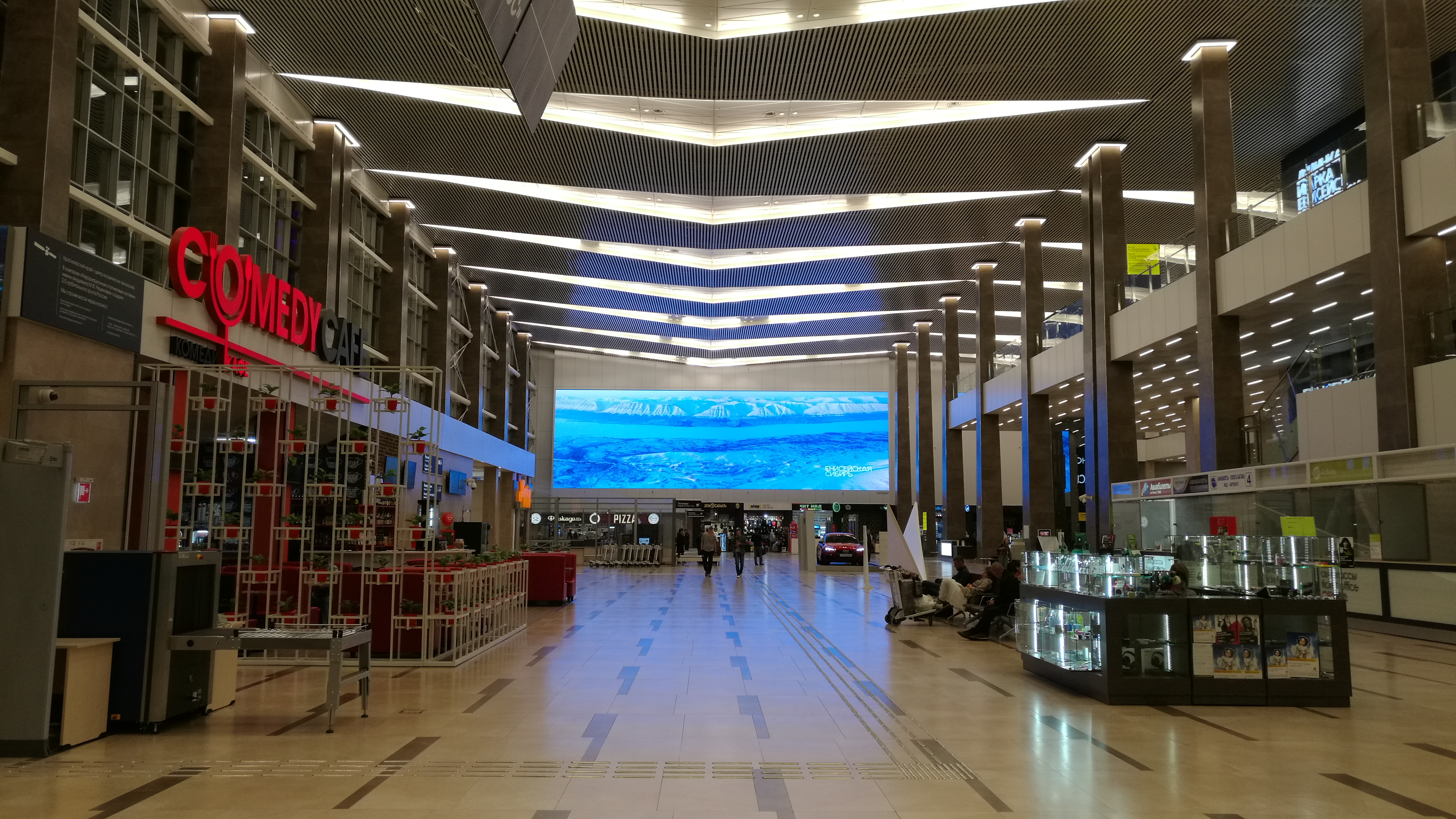
Inside the new terminal (check-in zone)

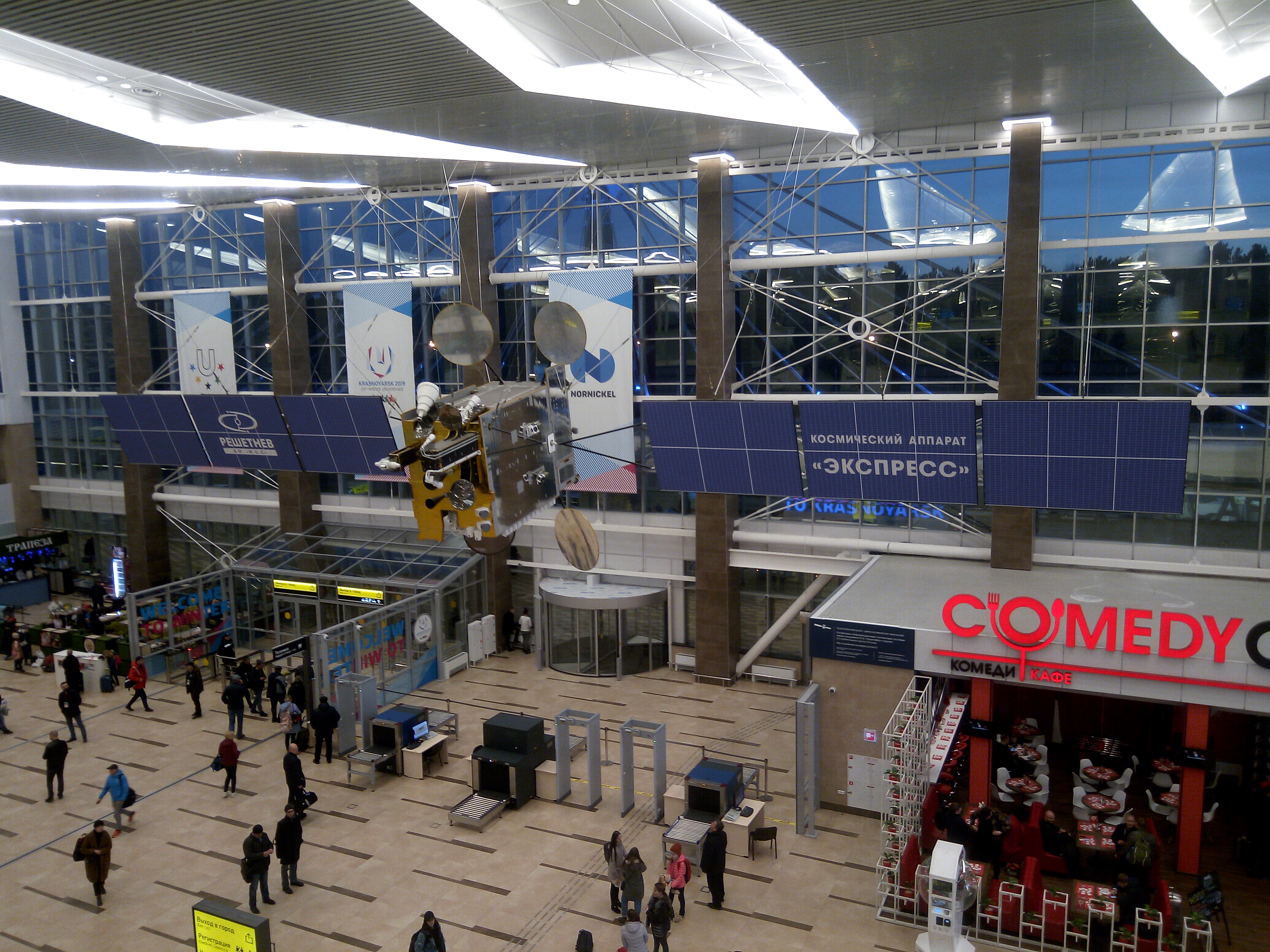
Airport entrance inside the terminal

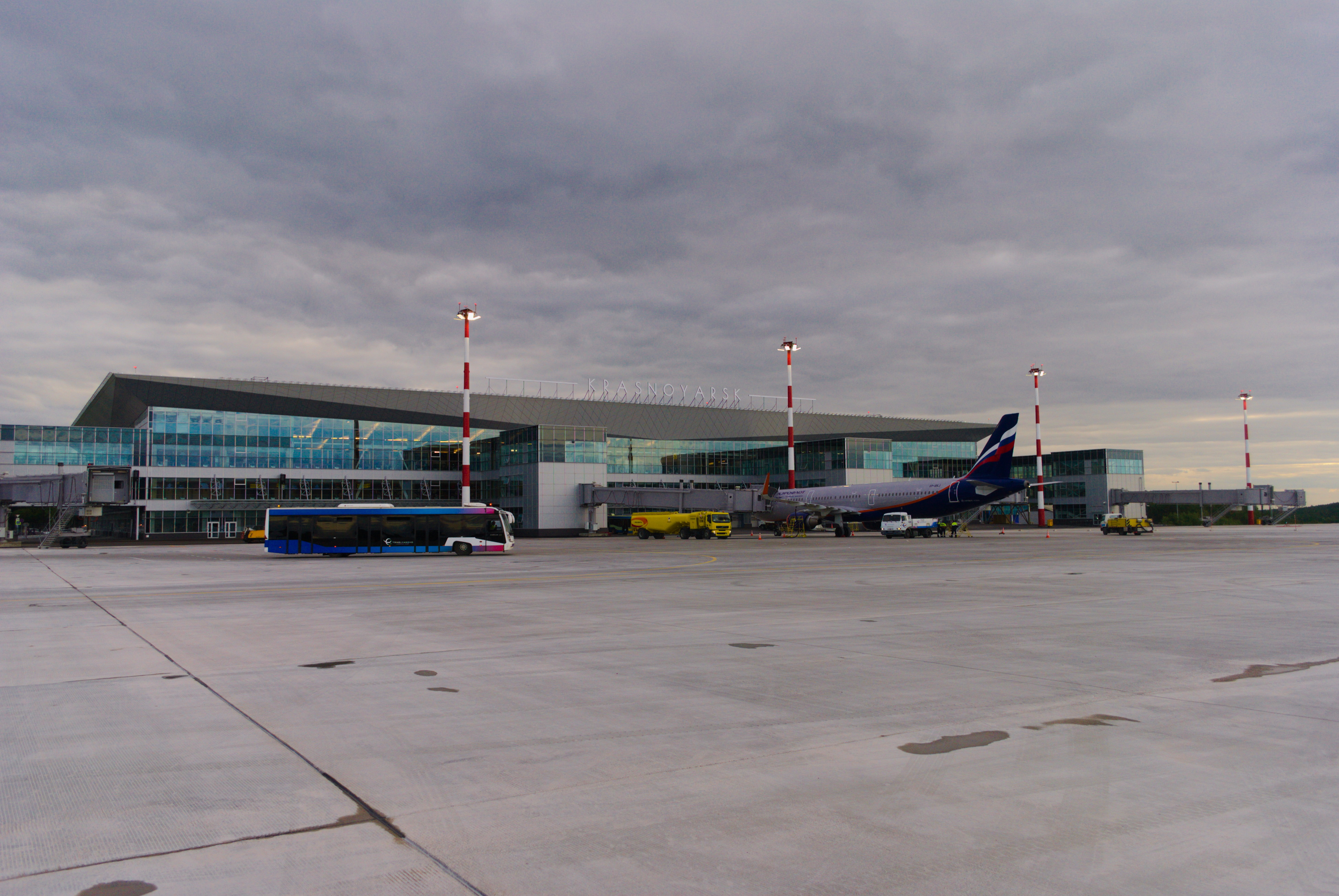
Apron view of new terminal 1

At present, the airport provides a full array of passenger handling services in all three terminals, including VIP services, a business lounge, baby/parent room, ATMs, shops, cafés, bars, a drugstore and a post office. Runway 29 is certified for ILS Category II operations. The runway condition, the facilities and the technology of aircraft handling allows the airport to service more than 50 types of passenger and freighter aircraft, up to and including the Boeing 777, Boeing 767, Boeing 747, Airbus A330 family, McDonnell Douglas MD-11, Antonov An-124 and others.

At Krasnoyarsk (Yemelyanovo) International Airport, the new terminal is under construction, planned to be completed by November 2017. On 16 December 2017, the airport planned to test the new passenger terminal and to commence operations also in December. The terminal will have six air-bridges.

On 8 December 2017, the new baggage system was tested at the airport. Another testing opening was planned for 16 December. The airport opened officially on 26 December 2017, with the flight commencement on the next day, with NordStar Boeing 737-800 to Norilsk.

On 16 March 2018, the air-bridges started working, by accepting the first flight from Moscow-Domodedovo of Globus Airlines GH73, which arrived at 18:50.

The terminal currently serves domestic routes, which caused terminal 1 to shut down passenger service on 27 December. The international flights will shift in 2018, and then terminal 2 will shut down the service, and the new terminal will be the only passenger terminal in the airport.

The re-construction of Terminal 1 is currently in process. It is planned to be changed in design, to easily integrate with the new terminal, and function. The old terminal will turn into a conference centre, to accept VIP flights more smoothly.

== Airlines and destinations ==
=== Passenger ===
Airlines	Destinations
Aeroflot	Krasnodar, Moscow–Sheremetyevo, Yekaterinburg; Seasonal: Bangkok–Suvarnabhumi, Phuket, Sanya
Aurora	Khabarovsk, Vladivostok
Avia Traffic Company	Bishkek, Osh
azimuth	Mineralnye Vody, Ufa
Azur Air	Seasonal charter: Colombo-Bandaranaike, Nha Trang, Pattaya-U-Tapao, Phuket
Centrum Air	Tashkent
Ikar	Seasonal charter: Nha Trang
IrAero	Baku, Irkutsk, Manzhouli
KrasAvia	Abakan, Barnaul, Baykit, Boguchany, Chara, Gorno-Altaysk, Igarka, Khatanga, Kemerovo, Kodinsk, Kyzyl, Lensk, Nizhneangarsk, Nizhnevartovsk, Novokuznetsk, Olyokminsk, Orenburg, Podkamennaya Tunguska, Severo-Yeniseysk, Svetlogorsk, Taksimo, Talakan, Tomsk, Tura, Turukhansk, Ulaanbaatar, Ulan-Ude, Vanavara
NordStar	Moscow–Domodedovo, Norilsk
Nordwind Airlines	Kazan, Saint Petersburg, Sochi
Pobeda	Moscow–Sheremetyevo
Rossiya	Almaty, Anadyr, Beijing–Daxing, Bishkek, Blagoveshchensk, Chelyabinsk, Chita, Guangzhou, Harbin, Irkutsk, Kazan, Khabarovsk, Khanty-Mansiysk, Krasnodar, Magadan, Makhachkala, Mineralnye Vody, Mirny, Neryungri, Novy Urengoy, Omsk, Osh, Perm, Petropavlovsk-Kamchatsky, Polyarny, Saint Petersburg, Samara, Shanghai-Pudong, Sochi, Surgut, Tashkent, Tyumen, Vladivostok, Yekaterinburg, Yuzhno-Sakhalinsk
S7 Airlines	Gorno-Altaysk, Irkutsk, Novosibirsk
SCAT Airlines	Şymkent
Shirak Avia	Yerevan
Somon Air	Dushanbe
Ural Airlines	Dushanbe, Khujand, Osh, Samarqand, Tashkent, Yekaterinburg
Utair	Moscow–Vnukovo
Uzbekistan Airways	Fergana, Namangan, Tashkent
VietJet Air	Seasonal charter: Da Nang, Nha Trang

=== Cargo ===
Airlines	Destinations
AirBridgeCargo Airlines	Amsterdam (suspended), Beijing–Capital, Hong Kong, Milan–Malpensa (suspended), Moscow–Sheremetyevo, Paris–Charles de Gaulle (suspended), Shanghai–Pudong

== Statistics ==
=== Annual traffic ===
Annual passenger traffic
Year	Passengers	% change
2010	1,275,000	Steady
2011	1,633,098	▲28%
2012	1,900,000	▲16.3%
2013	2,064,629	▲8.8%
2014	2,066,020	▲0.1%
2015	1,804,821	▼12.6%
2016	1,822,877	▲1%
2017	2,297,468	▲26%
2018	2,587,734	▲11.5%

== Incidents and accidents ==
- On 23 December 1984, Aeroflot Flight 3519 crashed at the airport during an emergency landing, killing all but one of the 111 people on board.

== See also ==
- List of the busiest airports in Russia
- List of the busiest airports in the former USSR
- Krasnoyarsk Cheremshanka Airport
