= Aeroflot Flight 3519 =

1984 aviation accident in the Soviet Union

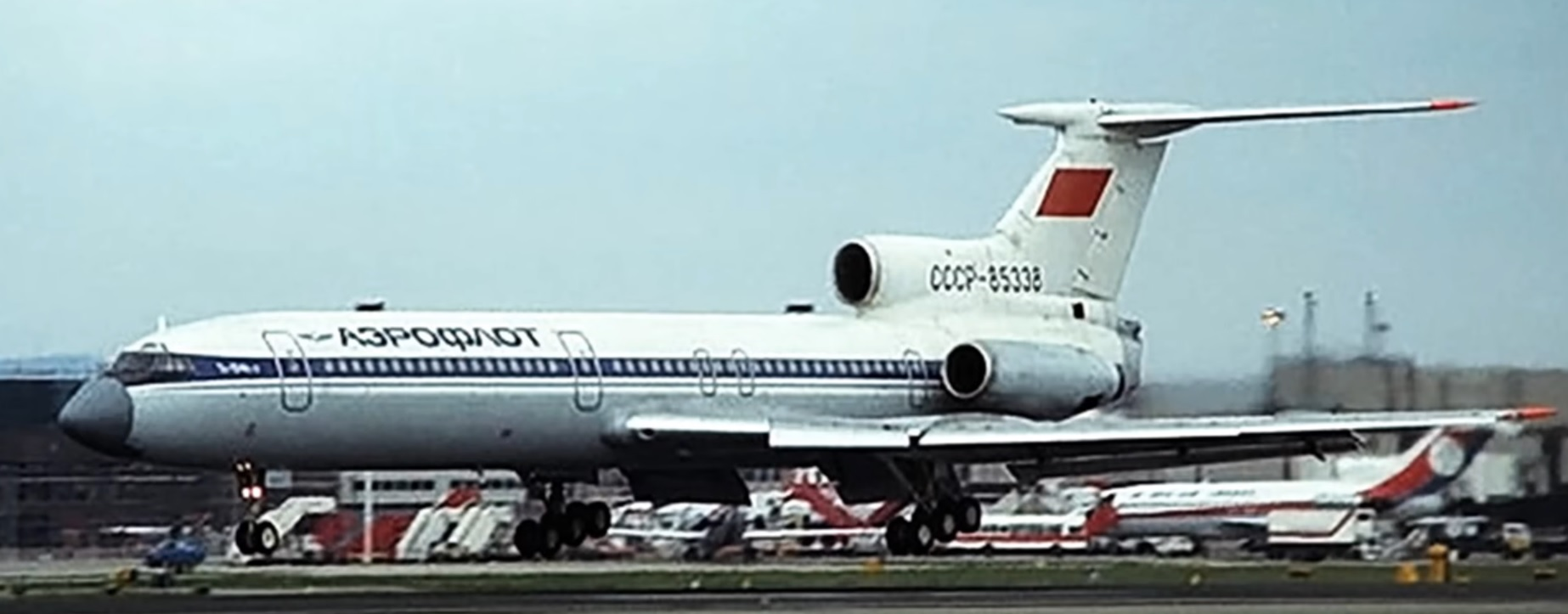
- CCCP-85338, the aircraft involved in the accident

Accident
- Date: 23 December 1984
- Summary: Uncontained engine failure, in-flight fire
- Site: Krasnoyarsk Airport, near Krasnoyarsk, Russian SFSR, Soviet Union; 56.1717°N 92.4933°E

Aircraft
- Aircraft type: Tupolev Tu-154B-2
- Operator: Aeroflot
- IATA flight No.: SU3519
- ICAO flight No.: AFL3519
- Call sign: AEROFLOT 3519
- Registration: CCCP-85338
- Flight origin: Krasnoyarsk Airport
- Destination: Irkutsk Airport
- Occupants: 111
- Passengers: 104
- Crew: 7
- Fatalities: 110
- Injuries: 1
- Survivors: 1

Aeroflot Flight 3519 was a scheduled flight operated by a Tupolev Tu-154 from Krasnoyarsk Airport in Krasnoyatsk, Soviet Union, to Irkutsk Airport in Irkutsk, Soviet Union. On December 23, 1984, the aircraft flying this route crashed due to an engine failure. 110 occupants died; one passenger survived the accident.

== Crews ==
- Captain: Viktor Semyonovich Falkov
- First Officer: Yury Petrovich Belavin
- Flight Engineer: Andrei Vasilievich Resnitsky
- Navigator: Gennady Leonidovich Ozerov
- Three Flight Attendants: Elena Borisovna Golikova, Marina Stepanovna Ulyankina and Natalya Petrovna Kolpakova

== Accident details ==
On 23 December 1984, at 2:08 p.m. KRAT (UTC/GMT+7 hours), Aeroflot Flight 3519 took off from Krasnoyarsk Airport for Irkutsk Airport, a distance of 879 kilometres (546 mi). The weather was clear with good visibility. The aircraft made a turn and climbed to 1,500 metres (4,900 ft). Ground communication cleared the aircraft for a climb to 5,700 metres (18,700 ft). Two minutes and one second into the flight, at a speed of 480 kilometres per hour (300 mph) and an altitude of 2,040 metres (6,690 ft), the No. 3 (starboard) engine failed and caught fire. This was due to a metallurgical and manufacturing defect in the first stage low pressure compressor disk. The flight engineer mistakenly shut down the No. 2 (center) engine; ten seconds later, he realized his error and attempted to restart it. The crew then began to turn the aircraft around for an emergency landing. The No. 3 engine was shut off and the crew unsuccessfully fired extinguishing bottles. Without warning, the No. 2 engine began turning at takeoff speed and could not be controlled by the engine power levers. The crew was able to shut it off, but the fuel valve remained open. By that time, the fire from the No. 3 engine had spread to the pylon and the auxiliary power unit in the rear compartment and continued to spread to the No. 2 engine. The fire damaged the aircraft's electrical system, causing the voltage to drop and the hydraulics to fail.

When Flight 3519 passed the outer marker of the runway of Krasnoyarsk Airport, it was flying at a speed of 420 kilometres per hour (230 kn; 260 mph) at an altitude of 175 metres (574 ft), and was descending at 10 metres per second (33 ft/s). Due to the extensive fire damage that left the aircraft with only one functional engine, the crew was unable to control the plane. It banked to the right and crashed into the runway at 2:15 pm at a 50-degree angle. The time between the start of the fire and the crash was four minutes and 30 seconds. The only survivor was one passenger, a 27-year-old man, who was badly injured. The other 110 people aboard the aircraft died. The aircraft was destroyed and partially burned in the crash.

== Technical data and statistics ==
The aircraft's initial flight was in 1979.

At the time of takeoff and the crash, the weather was calm, with visibility at more than 3,500 metres (11,500 ft), very few clouds, and a temperature of −18 °C (0 °F). The weather did not play a role in the crash.

Of the 104 passengers aboard, five were children. There were seven crew members. Of the 111 people aboard, all of the crew and 103 passengers were killed in the crash. No ground injuries or casualties were reported.

== See also ==
- List of aviation accidents and incidents with a sole survivor
