= Severo-Yeniseysk Airport =

Severo-Eniseysk Airport
- IATA: VEO; ICAO: UNIS

Summary
- Airport type: Public
- Location: Severo-Eniseysk
- Elevation AMSL: 1,706 ft / 520 m
- Coordinates: 60°22′24″N 93°0′42″E
- Interactive map of Severo-Eniseysk Airport

Runways
Direction	Length		Surface
Direction	ft	m	Surface
03/21	4,987	1,520	Concrete

Severo-Eniseysk Airport (Russian: Аэропорт Северо-Енисейск) (ICAO: UNIS) is an airport in Krasnoyarsk Krai, Russia, located 2 kilometres (1.2 mi) southwest of Severo-Eniseysk. It features a well-maintained concrete runway servicing small transports and passenger flights from Krasnoyarsk.

== Airlines and destinations ==
Airlines	Destinations
NordStar	Krasnoyarsk–International, Novosibirsk

== See also ==
- List of airports in Russia
