= Tura Airport =

Airport in Tura, Russia

- IATA: GOY; ICAO: UNIT

Summary
- Airport type: Public
- Location: Tura
- Elevation AMSL: 2,044 ft / 623 m
- Coordinates: 64°20′0″N 100°26′0″E
- Interactive map of Tura Airport

Runways
Direction	Length		Surface
Direction	ft	m	Surface
17/35	4,593	1,400	Concrete

Tura Airport (IATA: GOY, ICAO: UNIT) is a small airport in Krasnoyarsk Krai, Russia located 13 km (8.1 mi) northeast of Tura. KrasAvia operates flights to Krasnoyarsk Yemelyanovo Airport twice a week.

== Airlines and destinations ==
Airlines	Destinations
NordStar	Krasnoyarsk–International

== See also ==
- List of airports in Russia
