= Baikal International Airport =

International airport serving Ulan-Ude, Russia

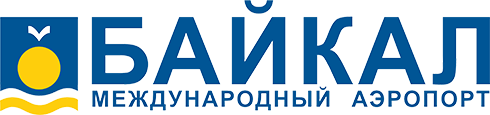

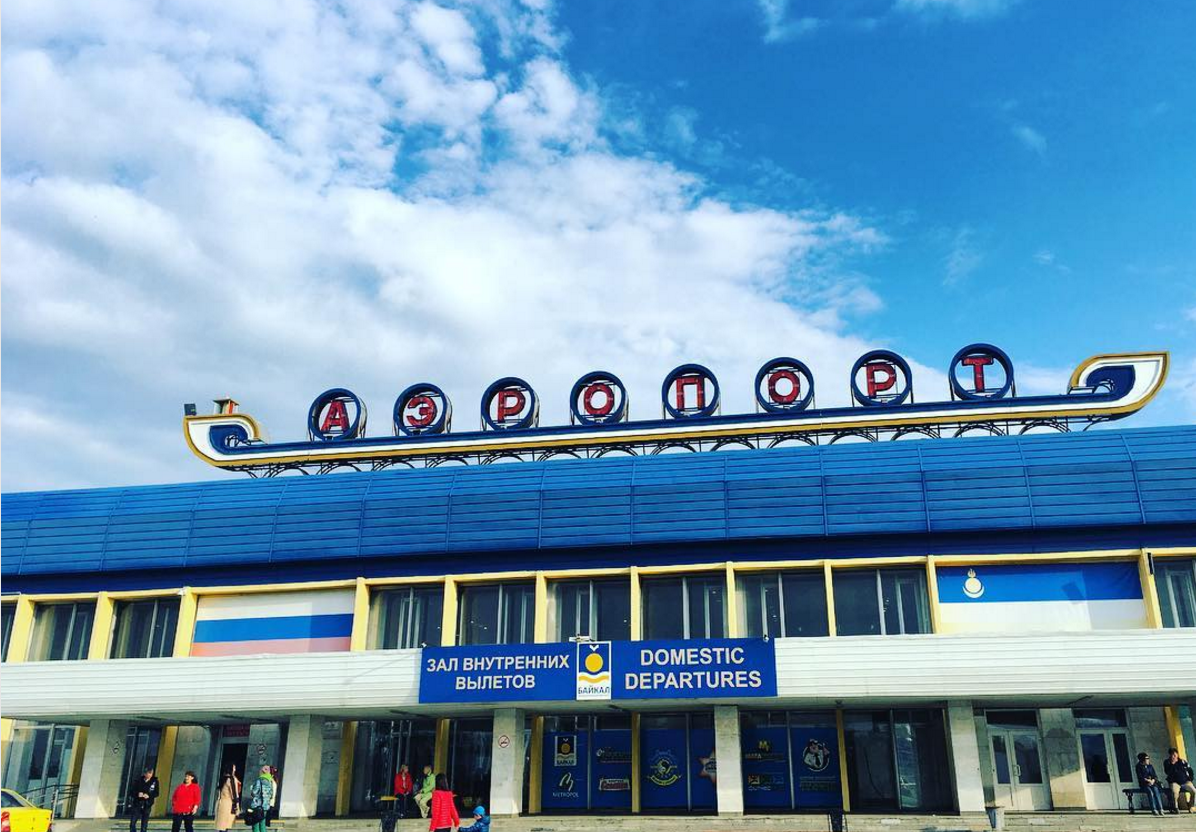
- IATA: UUD; ICAO: UIUU; LID: УЛЭ

Summary
- Airport type: Public / Military
- Owner: Russian Federation
- Operator: Novaport
- Serves: Ulan-Ude
- Location: Ulan-Ude, Russia
- Focus city for: Angara Airlines; IrAero; SiLA
- Coordinates: 51°48′27″N 107°26′25″E
- Website: AirportBaikal.ru

Map
- Location of airport in Republic of Buryatia

Runways
Direction	Length		Surface
Direction	m	ft	Surface
08/26	3,400	11,154	Concrete
- Source: DAFIF, airport website

Baikal International Airport (Note: Russian: Международный аэропорт «Байкал», romanized: Mezhdunaródnyy aeropórt «Baykál») (Buryat: Байгалай Олон улсын Нисэхэ онгосын буудал) formerly Ulan-Ude Airport (Note: Russian: Аэропорт Улан-Удэ, romanized: Aeropórt Ulán-Udé; Buryat: Улаан-Үдын ниидэхэ онгосын буудал, romanized: Ulaan-Üdiin niidekhe ongosiin buudal) (IATA: UUD, ICAO: UIUU), is an international airport located 12 kilometres (7.5 mi) west of Ulan-Ude, Buryatia. The airport has two terminals with customs and border control facilities with a capacity of 400 passengers per hour. In 2021, the airport served 540,094 passengers on more than 20 scheduled international and domestic destinations. The airport is named after the nearby Lake Baikal.

== History ==
=== 1925–1971 ===
In 1925, the airport began its first passenger service with the first aircraft traveling from Moscow to Beijing, with pilots Volkovoyinov and Polyakov participating in it. On 1 August 1926, the first flights started: Ulan-Ude – Ulan-Bator; in addition, the airport was a place for technical landing for flights from Irkutsk, Chita, Moscow, and Vladivostok. In 1931, the construction of the first air terminal began, where in 1935, the construction finished. From 1966, the airport began to accept Antonov An-24 and Tupolev Tu-104 aircraft.

=== 1971–1991 ===
In 1971, a new runway was constructed which optimized the airport to accept larger aircraft like the Ilyushin Il-18 from Moscow, where from 1980 to 1981, the runway was expanded by 800 metres, and it opened by accepting the first Tupolev Tu-154. In 1983, the first terminal stopped operating due to the opening of a new one. From September to October 1983, the airport was accepting transit flights from and to Chita, due to its closing, because of the runway re-construction. In 1988 and 1989, the airport started to serve a number of transit flights, including the international (Moscow – Pyongyang, including Air Koryo; Moscow – Ulan-Bator), shifted from Irkutsk, due to runway re-construction. That situation led to a huge optimization of the airport, where every day the airport accepted 70 flights, which 30 of them were served by Tupolev Tu-154. In 1990, the airport transferred 800,000 passengers in a year.

=== 1991–2006 ===
Until 2011, the airport was serving flights from Irkutsk and Chita when these airports had issues with construction or weather. There were no international flights until 2011.

=== 2006–2011 ===
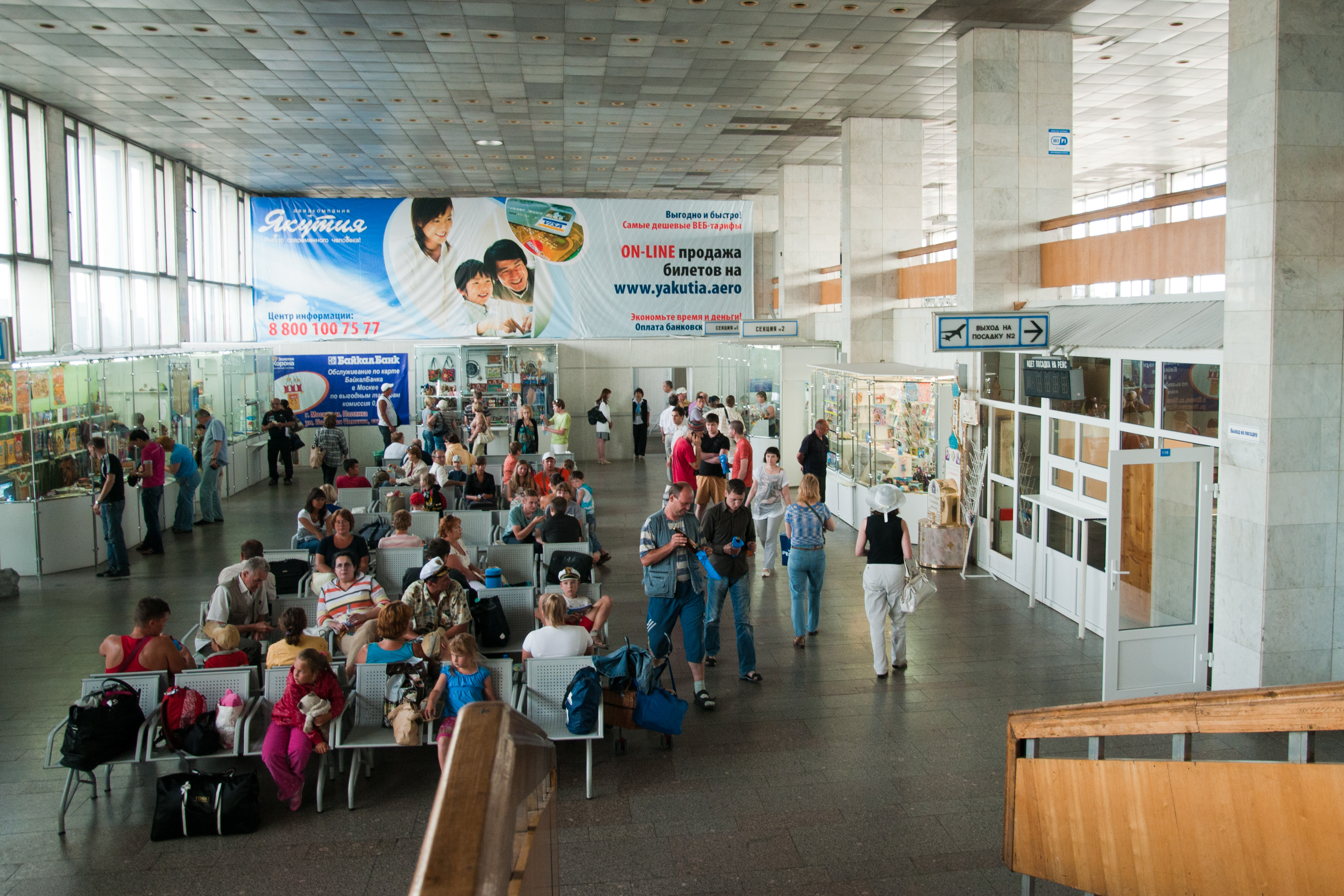
Airport's hall before reconstruction, that began in 2011.

In 2006, the airport underwent an overhaul of its runway, costing RUR 330 million (US$10 million). In 2007, the airport underwent renovations of its taxiways and parking areas, at a cost of RUR 230 million.

=== 2011–2017 ===
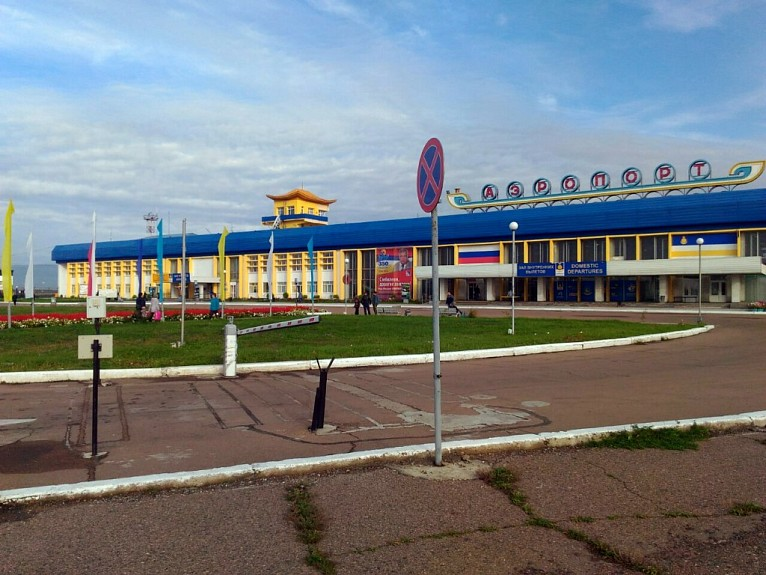
General view of the Ulan-Ude airport building

In March 2011, the renovation of the external terminal complex began, after when Metropol bought the airport. The reconstruction finished in August 2011. Till now in the airport are in process small reconstructions inside the terminal complex. The last renovation was expanding the second floor and making it a boarding zone, in addition the zone of check-up and passport check moved to the second floor. Also, the arrival and departure exits and entrances are now in different locations.

=== 2017–today ===
In September 2014, the Russian government, which owns the airport infrastructure, announced plans to build a new runway, with a cost of $157 million, parallel to the current. The latter will become a taxiway.

The runway commenced its service at night of 12 December 2018, with a S7 Airlines flight to Beijing.

In September 2017, the airport was sold by Metropol to Novaport. Novaport allowed the airport to attain "open skies" status, the Russian status granting foreign airlines the fifth freedom of the air. This allows more ambitious plans, such as the construction of a new passenger terminal. In addition, due to this status, international airlines such as Air China, China Eastern Airlines, Lucky Air, MIAT Mongolian Airlines and Spring Airlines are interested in starting flights to Ulan-Ude. Russia's flag carrier Aeroflot, having previously paused service to Ulan-Ude due to poor runway quality, announced that it would resume its service in 2018 or 2019, though those plans were initially delayed due to the 2018 FIFA World Cup.

On 7 December 2017, Buryatia governor Alexey Tsydenov announced that the construction of a new terminal would begin by the end of 2018. The first stage was planned to be the full reconstruction of the current terminal, and then for the new terminal to be constructed by 2022. Construction of the new terminal began on 28 April 2018, and was completed by 2024.

On November 21, 2024, the airport started operations in its new terminal. Designed to handle domestic flights, the terminal spans over 6,500 square meters, significantly boosting the airport’s capacity and efficiency. The terminal also includes two jet bridges for enhanced passenger convenience. The construction, costing over 37 million USD, aimed to modernize infrastructure and support growing tourism in the region.

== Airlines and destinations ==
Airlines	Destinations
Aeroflot	Moscow–Sheremetyevo
Aurora	Khabarovsk, Vladivostok
Centrum Air	Tashkent
IrAero	Blagoveshchensk, Irkutsk, Nizhneangarsk, Magadan, Taksimo, Yuzhno-Sakhalinsk
KrasAvia	Kyzyl; Seasonal: Gorno-Altaysk
Nordwind Airlines	Kazan
Red Wings Airlines	Barnaul, Kemerovo, Novokuznetsk, Yekaterinburg; Seasonal: Mineralnye Vody, Omsk
Rossiya Airlines	Krasnoyarsk–International, Vladivostok
S7 Airlines	Irkutsk, Moscow–Domodedovo, Novosibirsk
Smartavia	Moscow–Sheremetyevo
UVT Aero	Gorno-Altaysk, Kazan
Yakutia	Khabarovsk, Yakutsk

== Annual passenger traffic ==
Year	Passengers	% Change
2010	167,126 ▲	
2011	187,770 ▲	+12,4
2012	267,502 ▲	+42,5
2013	300,654 ▲	+12,4
2014	312,794 ▲	+4,04
2016	242,955 ▼	−22,3
2017	269,700 ▲	+11,0
2018	376,774 ▲	+39,7
2019	478,448 ▲	+27
2020	340,997 ▼	−28.7

=== Busiest routes ===
Busiest routes at Baikal International Airport (by number of passengers) 2018
Rank	City	Region	Country	Airports	Airlines	Number of passengers
1	Moscow	Moscow / Moscow Oblast	Russia	Domodedovo & Vnukovo Airports	Globus Airlines, Pobeda, S7 Airlines, Ural Airlines	223,713
2	Irkutsk	Irkutsk Oblast	Russia	International Airport Irkutsk	Angara Airlines, IrAero, RusLine	32,765
3	Novosibirsk	Novosibirsk Oblast	Russia	Novosibirsk Tolmachevo Airport	IrAero, S7 Airlines	26,532
4	Beijing		China	Beijing Capital International Airport	S7 Airlines	15,316
5	Khabarovsk	Khabarovsk Krai	Russia	Khabarovsk Novy Airport	IrAero, Yakutia Airlines	12,797
6	Yakutsk	(Sakha Republic) Republic of Yakutia	Russia	Yakutsk Airport	Yakutia Airlines	10,708

== See also ==
- List of airports in Russia
