= Alykel International Airport =

Alykel Airport Аэропорт Алыкель

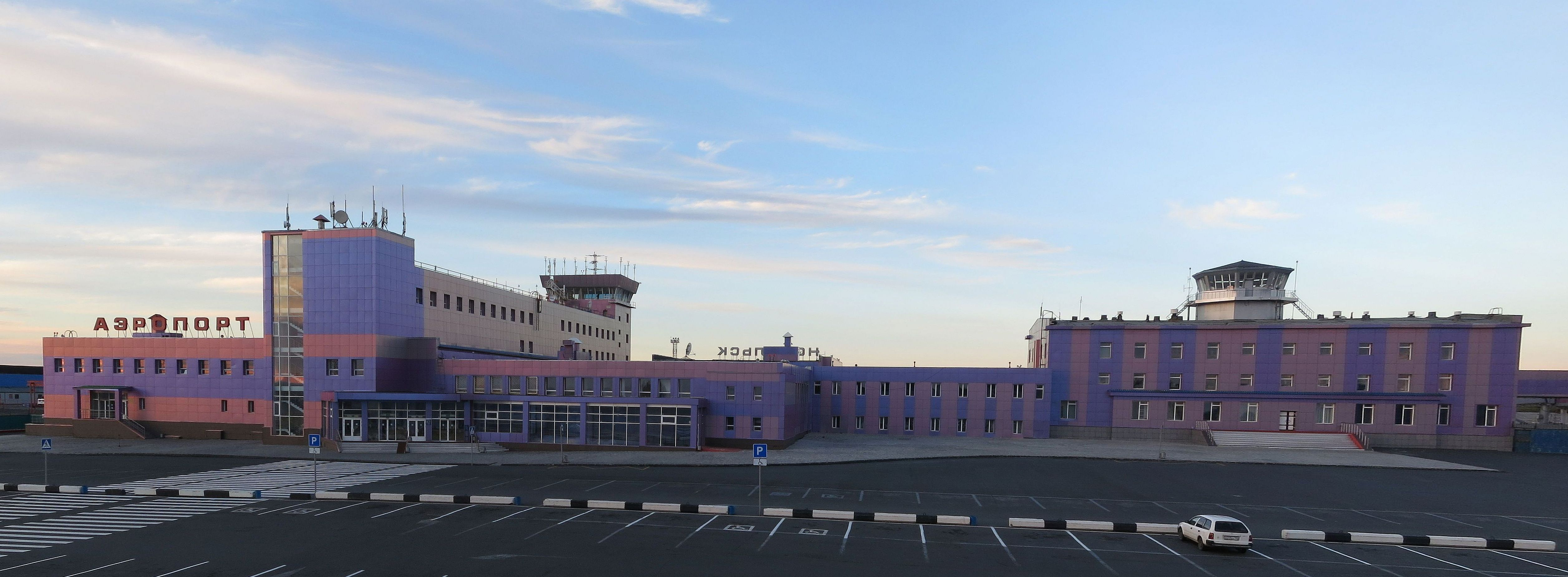
- IATA: NSK; ICAO: UOOO

Summary
- Airport type: Public
- Serves: Norilsk
- Location: Norilsk, Russia
- Hub for: NordStar
- Elevation AMSL: 574 ft (175 m)
- Coordinates: 69°18′36″N 87°20′0″E
- Website: Airport-Norilsk.ru

Map
- Location of airport in Krasnoyarsk Krai

Runways
Direction	Length		Surface
Direction	ft	m	Surface
01/19	11,254	3,430	Concrete

Alykel International Airport (Russian: Международный аэропорт Алыкель) (IATA: NSK, ICAO: UOOO) is an international airport in Krasnoyarsk Krai, Russia, located 35 kilometres (22 mi) west of Norilsk. Alykel is the only functional airfield near Norilsk. Since it is capable of handling wide-body jets, it is a diversion airport on Polar route 1. Since Norilsk does not have road or railroad connections to the rest of the country, the airport is the main gateway to the city.

It was constructed in 1964, when US reconnaissance satellites reported a new airfield with a 6,000 by 150 foot (1,829 m × 46 m) runway 16 nautical miles (30 km) west of Norilsk. This allowed the use of Norilsk as a staging base for Soviet bombers to reach the United States. This role continues to this day, with caretaker status provided by the Russian Air Force's OGA (Arctic Control Group). Norilsk also was served by interceptor aircraft under the 57 IAP (57th Guards Red Banner Fighter Aviation Regiment PVO), which in 1991 had 24 Sukhoi Su-15TM aircraft.

The airport received international status on 1 February 2023.

== Airlines and destinations ==
As of August 2025, the airport serves following destinations:

Airlines	Destinations
KrasAvia	Dikson, Khatanga, Turukhansk
NordStar	Abakan, Chelyabinsk, Krasnodar, Krasnoyarsk–International, Mineralnye Vody, Moscow–Domodedovo, Novosibirsk, Saint Petersburg, Sochi, Ufa, Volgograd, Yekaterinburg; Seasonal: Kazan, Makhachkala, Nizhny Novgorod, Omsk, Perm, Samara, Tyumen
S7 Airlines	Moscow–Domodedovo, Novosibirsk
Utair	Seasonal: Krasnoyarsk–International

== Accidents and incidents ==
- On 16 November 1981, Aeroflot Flight 3603, a Tupolev Tu-154, crashed while attempting to land at Norilsk Airport. Ninety-nine of the 167 passengers and crew on board were killed in the accident.
- On 9 January 2024, NordStar Airlines Flight 207, a 737-800, experienced a runway excursion upon landing on runway 19. None of the occupants on board were injured.

== Rail link to airport ==
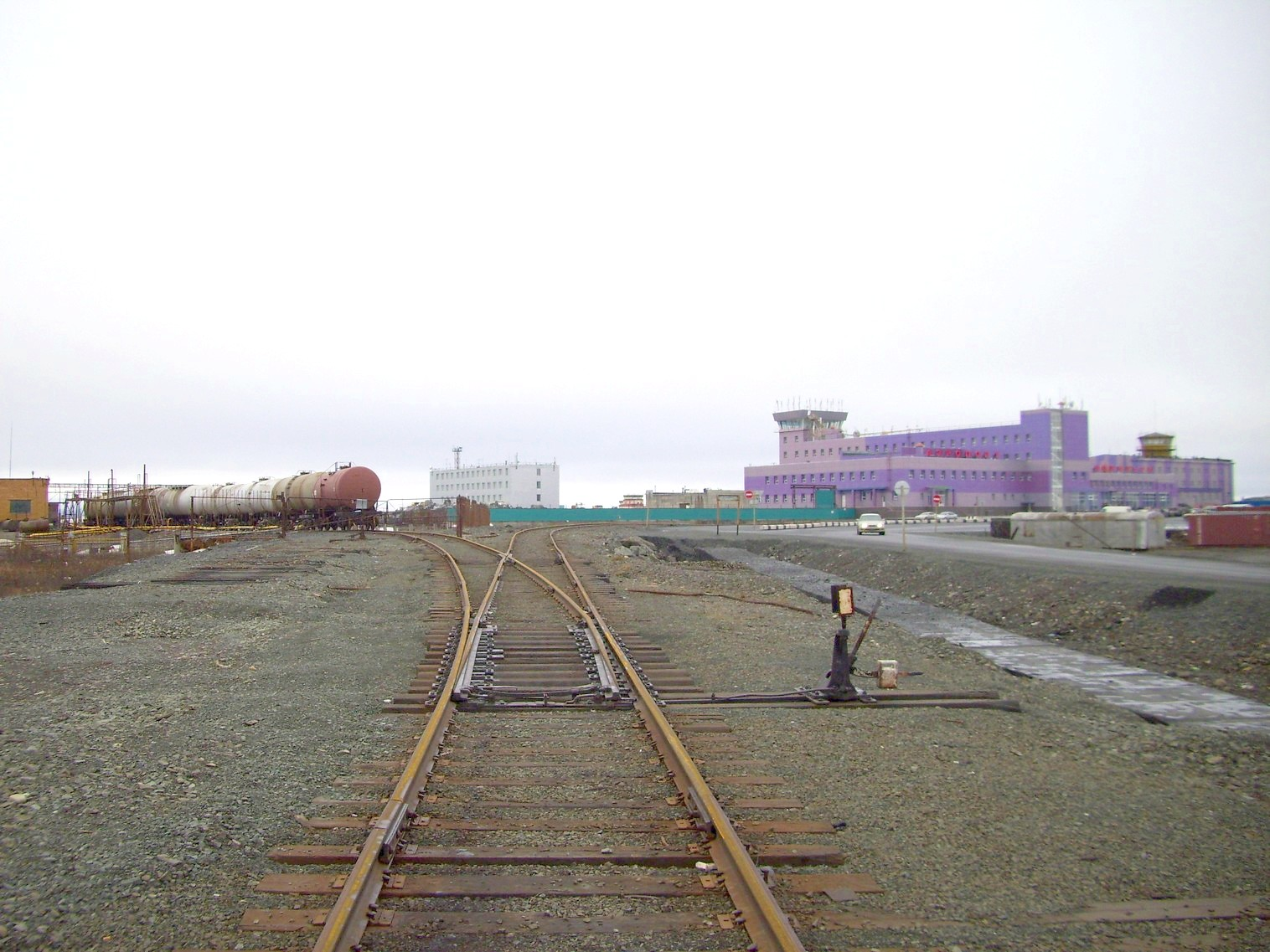
Former train stop next to terminal building (2010)

An electrified rail link Norilsk-Oktyabrskaya - Airport was operated from 1967-11-22 to 1998.

== See also ==
- List of airports in Russia
