= Svetlogorsk Airport =

Svetlogorsk
- IATA: SES; ICAO: UOIG

Summary
- Airport type: Public
- Location: Svetlogorsk, Krasnoyarsk Krai
- Elevation AMSL: 394 ft / 120 m
- Coordinates: 66°50′24″N 88°24′12″E
- Interactive map of Svetlogorsk

Runways
Direction	Length		Surface
Direction	ft	m	Surface
07/25	5,413	1,650	Concrete

Svetlogorsk Airport (IATA: SES, ICAO: UOIG) is an airport in Krasnoyarskiy, Russia located 11 km south of Svetlogorsk, Krasnoyarsk Krai. It handles small transport aircraft. The airport has an extremely spartan layout with one perpendicular taxiway to the parking area.

== Airlines and destinations ==
Airlines	Destinations
KrasAvia	Krasnoyarsk–International

== See also ==
- List of airports in Russia
