= Boguchany Airport =

- IATA: BGS; ICAO: UNKB

Summary
- Airport type: Public
- Location: Boguchany (rural locality)
- Elevation AMSL: 446 ft / 136 m
- Coordinates: 58°22′48″N 97°28′24″E

Map

Runways
Direction	Length		Surface
Direction	ft	m	Surface
08/26	3,937	1,200	Concrete

Boguchany Airport (Russian: аэропорт Богучаны) (IATA: BGS, ICAO: UNKB) is a small airport in Russia located in Boguchany. It has a paved, minimal utilitarian layout.

== Airlines and destinations ==
Airlines	Destinations
AeroGeo	Krasnoyarsk–Cheremshanka
KrasAvia	Krasnoyarsk–International

== See also ==
- List of airports in Russia
