= Nizhneangarsk Airport =

Airport in Severobaykalsk, Buryatia, Russia

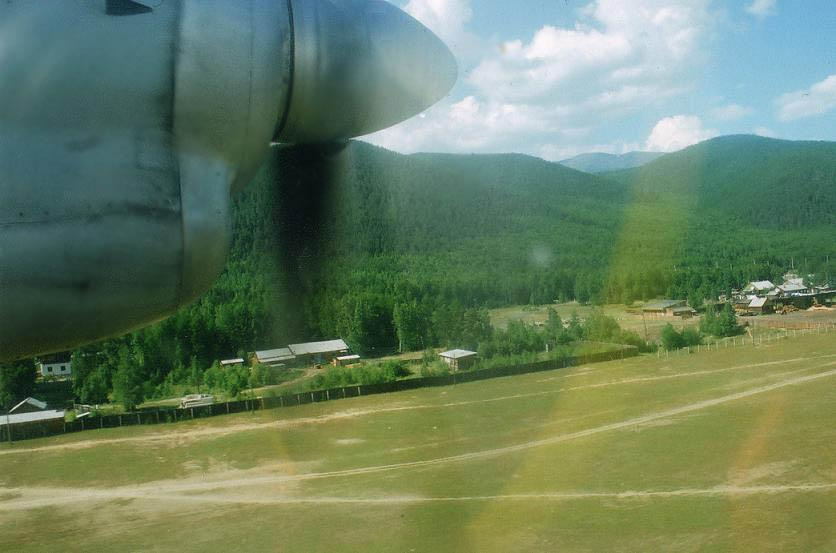
- IATA: none; ICAO: UIUN; LID: НЖГ

Summary
- Airport type: Public
- Operator: JSC "Buryat Airlines"
- Location: Severobaykalsk
- Elevation AMSL: 1,545 ft / 471 m
- Coordinates: 55°48′6″N 109°35′12″E
- Interactive map of Nizhneangarsk Airport

Runways
Direction	Length		Surface
Direction	ft	m	Surface
04/22	5,423	1,653	Concrete

Nizhneangarsk Airport (Buryat: Доодо Ангар Аэропорт, Russian: Аэропорт Нижнеангарск) (ICAO: UIUN) is an airport in Russia located 4 km (2.5 mi) northeast of Nizhneangarsk and 26 km (16 mi) northeast of Severobaykalsk. It is located at the northern tip of Lake Baikal. It handles small transport aircraft and has a well-maintained runway.

== Airlines and destinations ==
Airlines	Destinations
Ayana	Krasnoyarsk–Cheremshanka, Kyzyl, Ulan-Ude

== Accidents and incidents ==
- On 27 June 2019, Angara Airlines Flight 200 overran the runway on landing and collided with a building. Two of the 47 people on board were killed.

== See also ==
- List of airports in Russia
