= Barnaul Airport =

Airport in Altai Krai, Russia

Barnaul Gherman Titov International Airport Международный аэропорт Барнаул имени Германа Титова

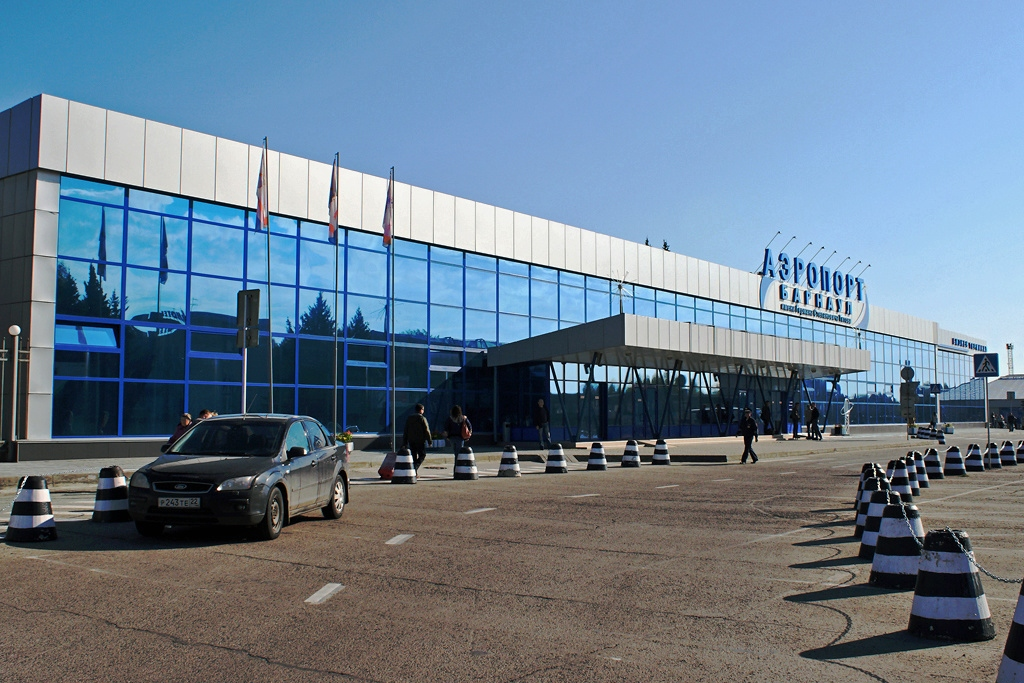
- IATA: BAX; ICAO: UNBB

Summary
- Airport type: Public
- Operator: JSC "Altay Air Enterprise"
- Serves: Barnaul, Altai Krai
- Elevation AMSL: 837 ft (255 m)
- Coordinates: 53°21′48″N 83°32′30″E
- Website: airaltay.ru

Map
- Location of airport in Altai Krai BAX (Russia)

Runways
Direction	Length		Surface
Direction	ft	m	Surface
06/24	9,350	2,850	Concrete

Barnaul Gherman Titov International Airport (Russian: Международный аэропорт Барнаул имени Германа Титова) (IATA: BAX, ICAO: UNBB) (sometimes referred to as Barnaul West or Mikhaylovka) is a major airport in Altai Krai, Russia located 17 km west of Barnaul. It contains large facilities and a remote tarmac, likely for military use. The airport services airliners and helicopters of all sizes, including planes as large as the Boeing 747, and the Il-96.

Barnaul Airport is named after Soviet cosmonaut Gherman Titov, an Altai Krai native who was the second human being (after Yuri Gagarin) to visit outer space.

== History ==
- The first airport in this location was built in 1937 as a base for Soviet Po-2 biplanes.
- On 12 March 1967, a new modern airport complex was opened with a 2,000-metre (6,600 ft) runway, taxiways, an apron, hotel, and office space. That same year, direct flights to Moscow began.
- On 2 January 1975, the runway was lengthened from 2,000 to 2,500 metres (6,600 to 8,200 ft), and the airport began to receive Tu-154 planes.
- In 1995, the airport officially became an international airport.
- In 1998, the airport's runway was further lengthened to its current length of 2,850 metres (9,350 ft).
- On 26 June 2008, a new arrivals area was opened with a capacity of 500 people per hour.
- On May 27, 2010, the Altai Krai Legislative Assembly officially named the airport after Gherman Titov.

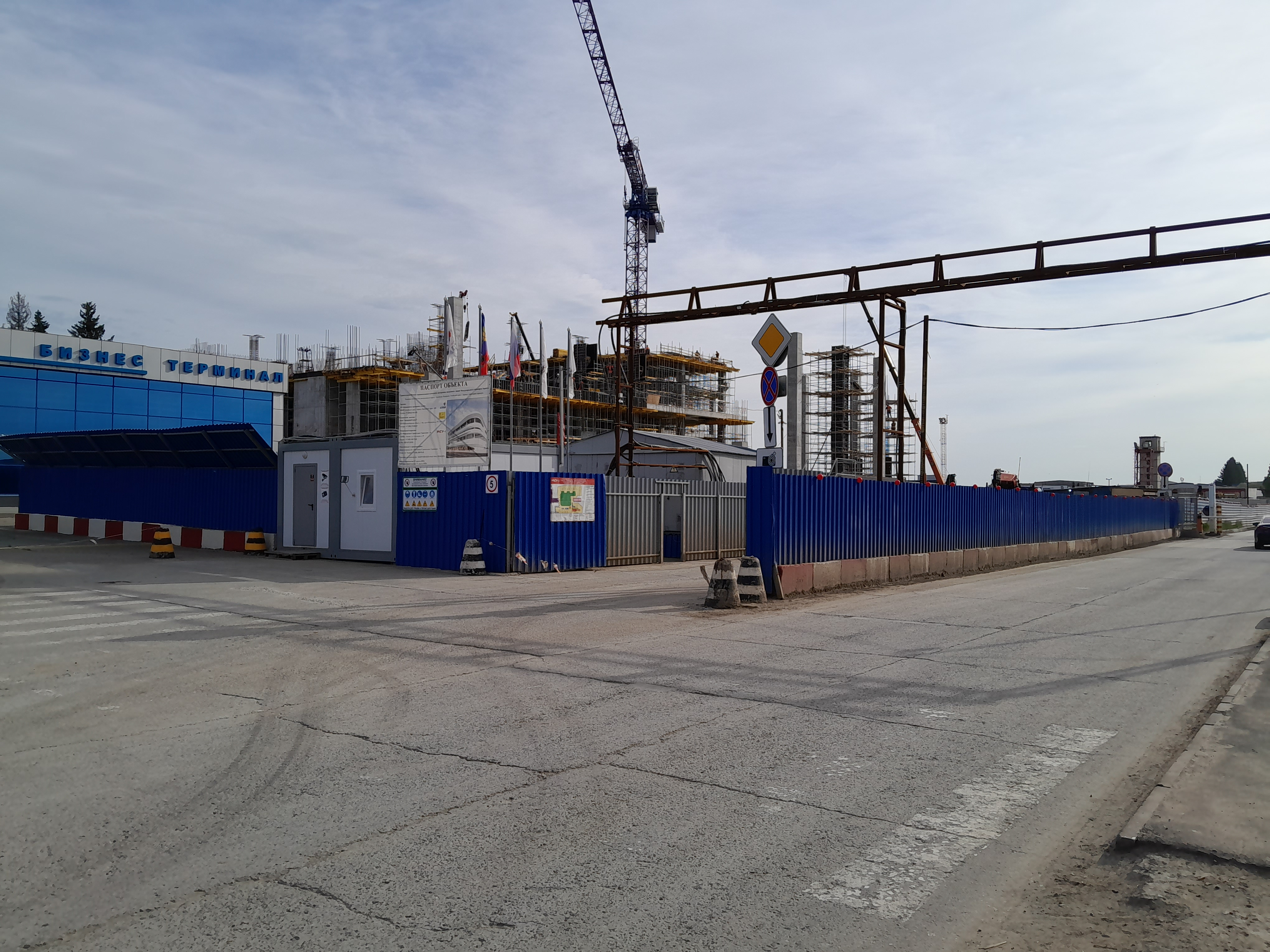
Construction of terminal extension (2024)

A new 7,000-square-metre (75,000 sq ft) international area and runway extension are planned, which will allow the airport to receive all types of aircraft without restrictions.

== Passenger Statistics ==
Airport passengers by year:
Year	2010	2011	2012	2013	2014	2015	2017	2018	2019
Passenger totals (thousands)	318	357.5	377	337.7	387.8	378	521.6	507.5	532.0

== Airlines and destinations ==
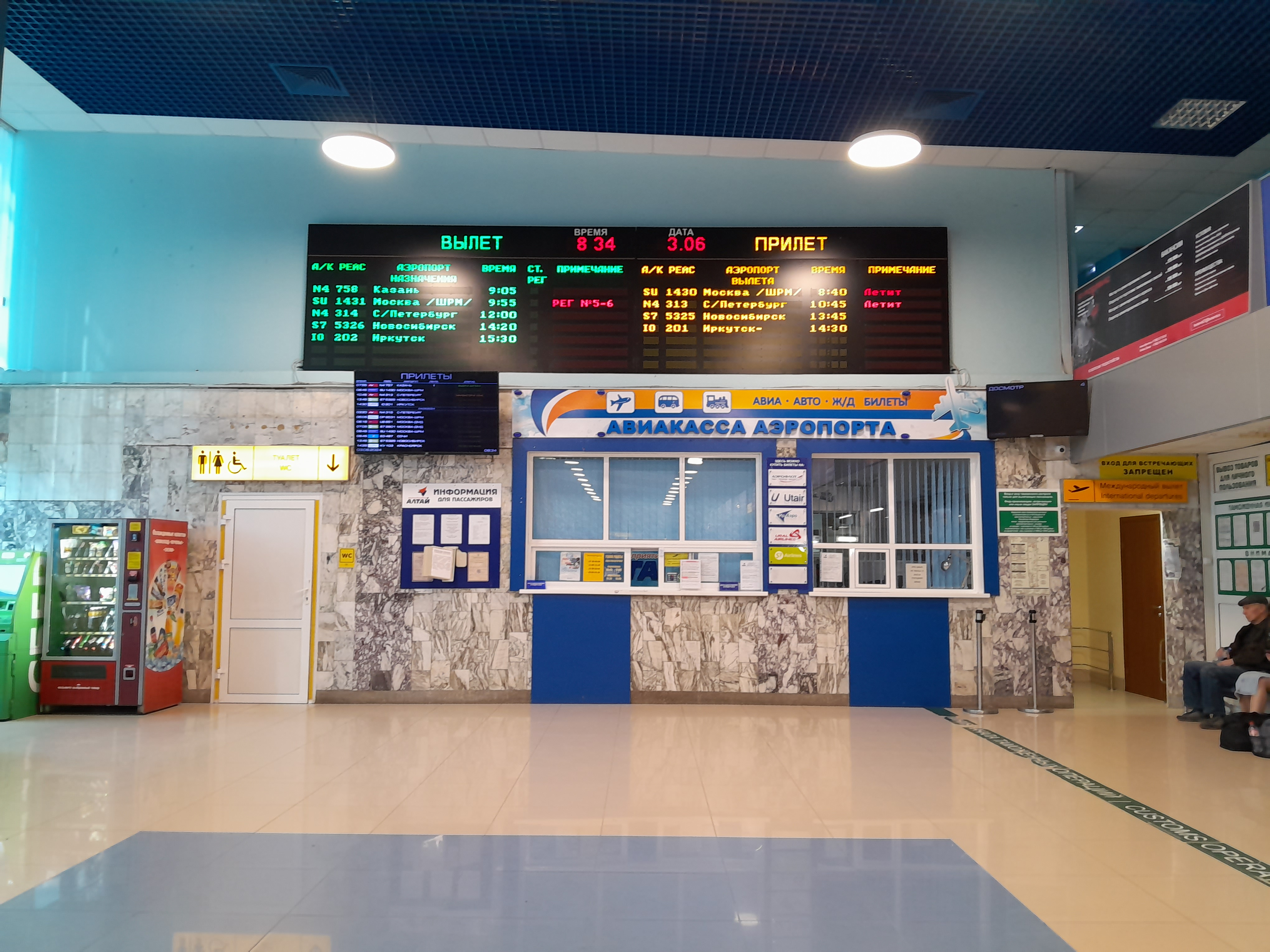
Departure board in main hall of passenger terminal (2024)

The following airlines operate regular scheduled and charter flights at Barnaul Airport:

Airlines	Destinations
Aeroflot	Moscow–Sheremetyevo
Azur Air	Seasonal charter: Nha Trang, Pattaya, Phuket
Ikar	Sochi
KrasAvia	Krasnoyarsk–International
Nordwind Airlines	Kazan, Saint Petersburg, Sochi
Pobeda	Moscow–Sheremetyevo
Red Wings Airlines	Chita, Ulan-Ude, Yekaterinburg
S7 Airlines	Moscow–Domodedovo, Novosibirsk
Ural Airlines	Moscow–Domodedovo
Utair	Surgut
VietJet Air	Seasonal charter: Nha Trang

== Transport links ==
The airport can be reached from Barnaul by marshrutka number 144 and by bus number 110.

== See also ==
- Novokuznetsk Spichenkovo Airport (located in Kemerovo Oblast 213 km (132 mi) from Barnaul)
- List of airports in Russia
