= Taksimo Airport =

Airport in Taksimo, Buryatia, Russia

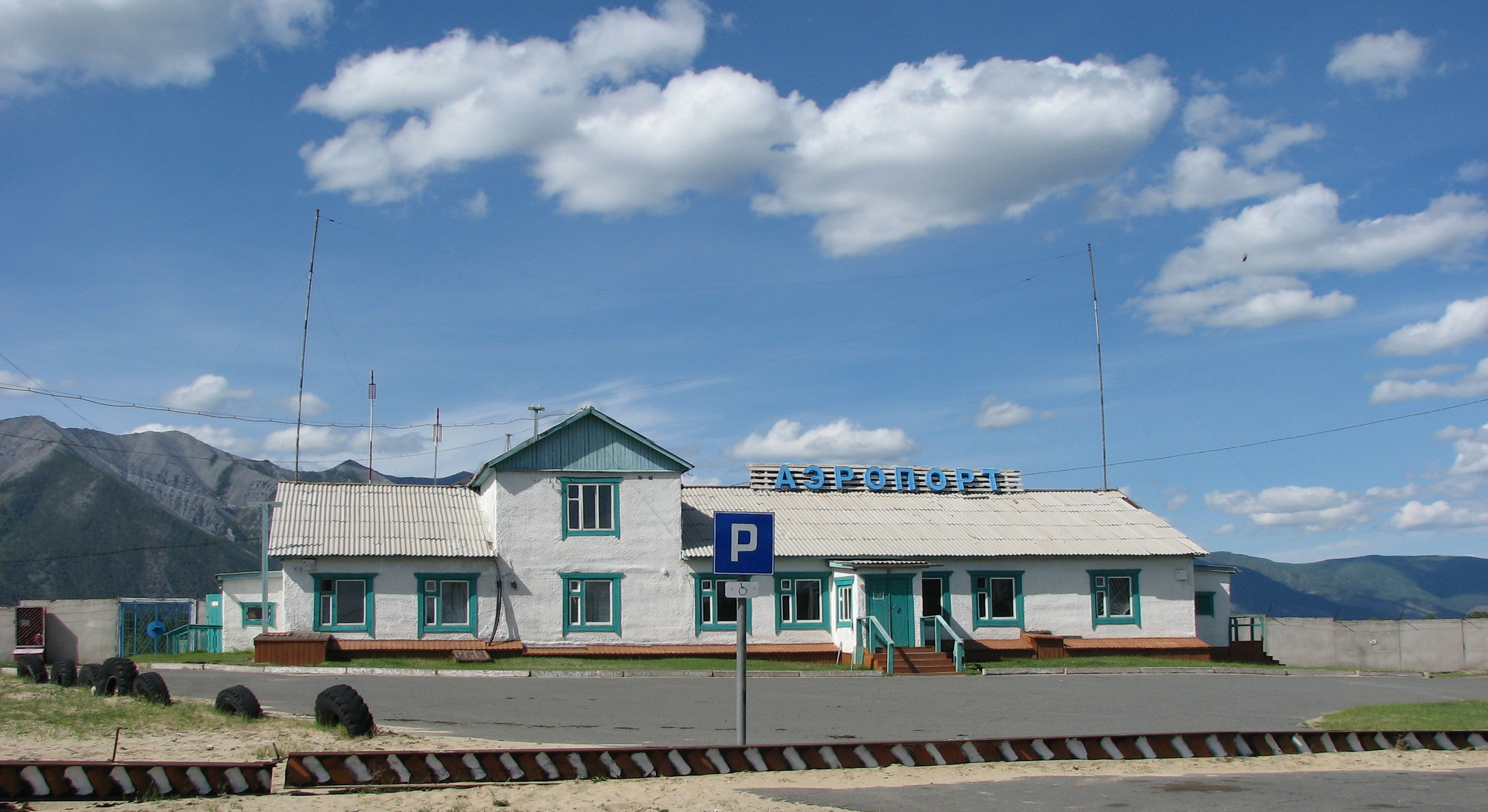
- IATA: ТKM; ICAO: UIKG; LID: ТИО

Summary
- Airport type: Public
- Location: Taksimo
- Elevation AMSL: 2,001 ft / 610 m
- Coordinates: 56°21′42″N 114°55′48″E
- Interactive map of Taksimo Airport

Runways
Direction	Length		Surface
Direction	ft	m	Surface
08/26	6,562	2,000	Concrete

Taksimo Airport (Buryat: Таксимо Аэропорт) is an airport in Buryatia located 3 km northeast of Taksimo. It is a paved airport with a parking apron. It has civilian use.

== Airlines and destinations ==
Airlines	Destinations
IrAero	Ulan-Ude

== See also ==
- List of airports in Russia
