= Talakan =

Talakan Талакан
- work settlement
- Interactive map of Talakan
- Location of Talakan Talakan (Amur Oblast)
- Coordinates: 50°17′45″N 130°16′56″E
- Country: Russia
- Federal subject: Amur Oblast
- Administrative district: Bureysky District

Population (2010 Census)
  - Total: 5,176
  - Estimate (1997): 6,100 (+17.9%)

Municipal status
  - Municipal district: Bureysky Municipal District
  - Urban settlement: Work Settlement Talakan Urban Settlement
  - Capital of: Work Settlement Talakan Urban Settlement
- Time zone: UTC+9 (MSK+6)
- Postal code: 676731
- OKTMO ID: 10615172051

Talakan (Russian: Талакан) is an urban locality (a work settlement) in Bureysky District of Amur Oblast, Russia. Population: 5,176 (2010 census); 6,545 (2002 census); 4,479 (1989 Soviet census).
