= Tolmachevo Airport =

Airport in Ob, Russia

Novosibirsk Tolmachevo Airport Novosibirsk Аэропорт Толмачёво

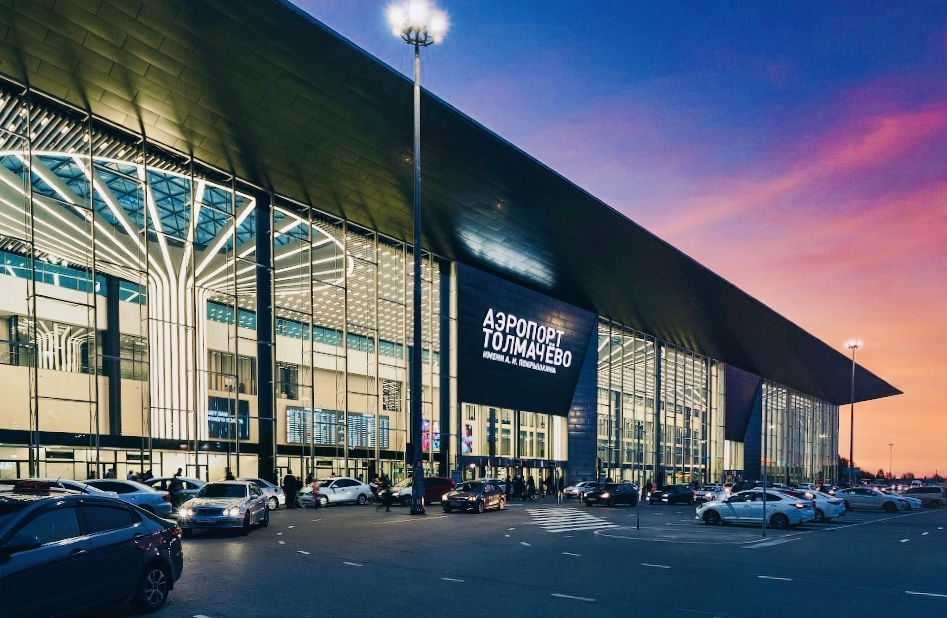
- IATA: OVB; ICAO: UNNT; LID: ТЛЧ

Summary
- Airport type: Military / Public
- Owner: Roman Trotsenko through Novaport
- Operator: Tolmachevo Airport (JSC)
- Serves: Novosibirsk
- Location: Ob, Russia
- Hub for: S7 Airlines
- Elevation AMSL: 365 ft (111 m)
- Coordinates: 55°00′45″N 82°39′02″E
- Website: www.tolmachevo.ru

Map
- Location of airport in Novosibirsk Oblast OVB (Russia) OVB (Asia)

Runways
Direction	Length		Surface
Direction	m	ft	Surface
07/25	3,600	11,801	Asphalt concrete
16/34	3,600	11,818	Concrete

Statistics (2020)
- Passengers: 4,634,166
- Passenger change 19–20: ▼31.3%
- Aircraft movements: 30,770
- Movements change 19–20: ▼7.3%
- Sources: Passenger Traffic, ACI Europe; AIP of the Russian Federation, Tolmachevo media centre*

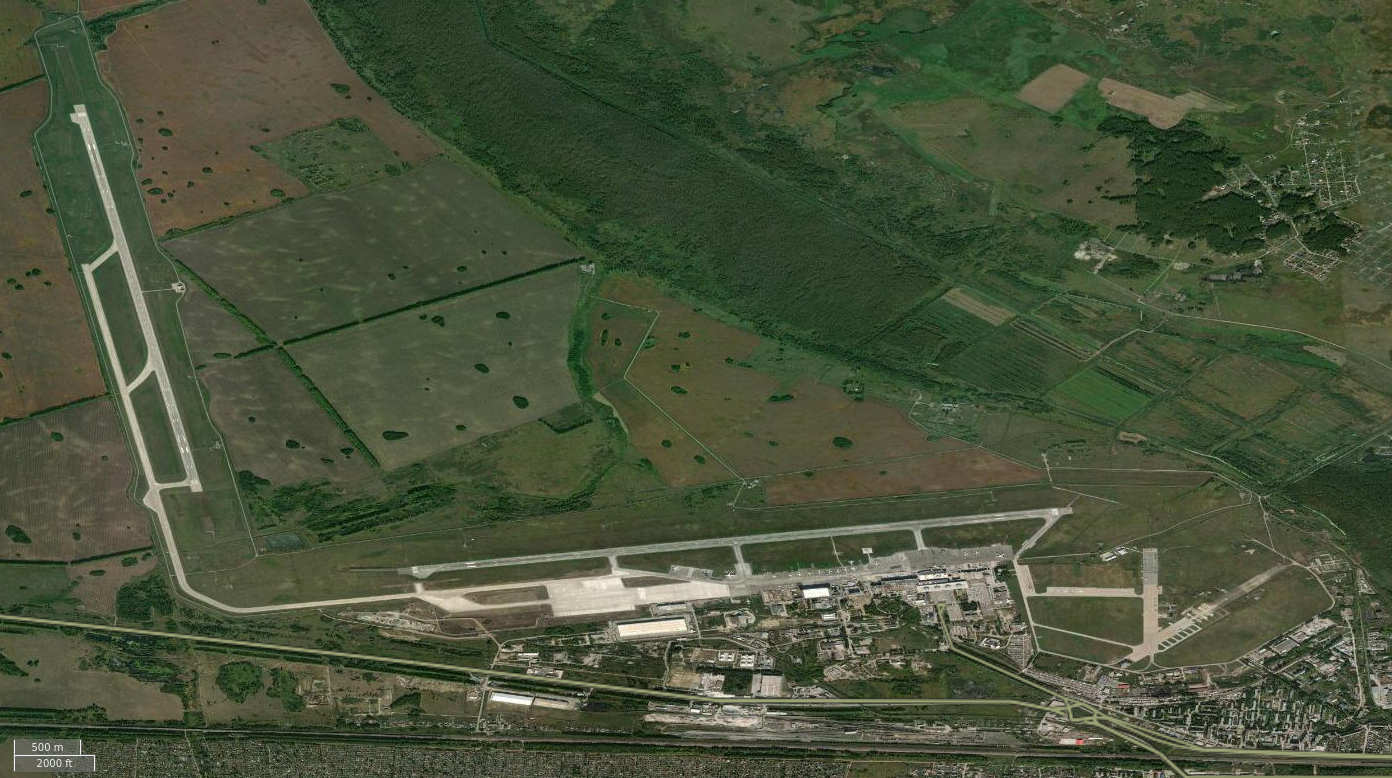
Satellite imagery of Tolmachevo Airport

Novosibirsk Tolmachevo Airport (Russian: Аэропо́рт Толмачёво) (IATA: OVB, ICAO: UNNT) is an international airport situated in the town of Ob, 16 kilometres (9.9 mi) west of the center of Novosibirsk, Siberia, Russia.

== Overview ==
There are two (3,600 metres (11,800 ft) and 3,605 metres (11,827 ft)) active runways in Tolmachevo Airport, along with one large passenger terminal with two connected sections (Section A for domestic flights (25,000 square metres (270,000 sq ft), 18 check-in desks, 2 jet bridges, capacity 1,800 passengers/hour, and Section B for international flights (27,000 square metres (290,000 sq ft), 14 check-in desks, 3 jet bridges, capacity 1,300 passengers/hour), 2 cargo terminals and 61 aircraft stands. Runway 16 is equipped with an ILS CAT II, which enables aircraft operations in low ceiling (30 metres) and visibility (350 metres).

The airport is situated in the middle of the route from some important East-Asian cities (e.g. Seoul, Shanghai, Hong Kong, etc.) to Europe which makes it attractive for cargo airlines to use it for refueling stops. It serves also as a diversion airport on Polar route 1.

Tolmachevo is the busiest airport in Siberia, the 6th busiest airport in Russia as well as the 8th busiest in the Post-Soviet states. It is also the busiest regional transit airport in Russia outside Moscow MOW.

The Tolmachevo Airport is operated by Novaport since 2011.

== History ==
Operations began on July 12, 1957, with the first passenger flight of a Tupolev Tu-104 from Novosibirsk to Moscow. The airport was owned by United Tolmachevo Aviation Enterprise and the Ministry of Civil Aviation of the USSR until 1992. The airport then became a joint stock company in 1995, with 51% owned by the state. The domestic terminal was completely renovated in 2006. Tolmachevo Airport is also the first Russian airport to receive an ISO 9002-96 certificate. On November 29, 2012, for the first time in its history, the airport received its three-millionth annual passenger. During 2014-2015, the former international terminal was enlarged and merged with the domestic terminal which doubled its passenger capacity. The airport celebrated its four-millionth annual passenger on December 21, 2016. In the last hours of 2017, another milestone was reached: on December 31, 2017, the airport handled its five-millionth annual passenger. On December 18, 2019, the airport celebrated its first 6.5-millionth annual passenger.

Plans for its further development include construction of a new rapid-exit taxiway and 4 stands for wide-body aircraft, On 15 September 2020 the airport commenced construction works of the new terminal. Work is being conducted by contractor Ant Yapı (Turkey). Construction of the 56,000-square-metre (600,000 sq ft) terminal was completed in the third quarter of 2022. Phase two work will be completed by 2025. The total area of the airport terminal will be more than 100,000 m^{2} (1,100,000 sq ft).

The airport is also home to the 337th Independent Helicopter Regiment (previously called the 562nd Air Base (Army Aviation)) flying Mil Mi-24P's and Mil Mi-8AMTSh-V's and the Composite Aviation Squadron, 32nd Independent Composite Transport Aviation Regiment, both as part of the 14th Air and Air Defence Forces Army.

== Accidents and incidents ==
- On January 27, 2009, a Cessna Citation V operated by the Tyrol Air Ambulance with registration OE-GAA had a wheels-up landing at Tolmachevo.
- On 13 November 2020, an Antonov An-124 Ruslan aircraft operating Volga-Dnepr Airlines Flight 4066 suffered an uncontained engine failure on departure and was severely damaged. On landing back at Tolmachevo, the aircraft overran the runway and was further damaged when its nosewheels collapsed. All fourteen people on board survived.

== Airlines and destinations ==
=== Passenger ===
Airlines	Destinations
Aeroflot	Bangkok–Suvarnabhumi, Krasnodar, Moscow–Sheremetyevo, Saint Petersburg, Yekaterinburg; Seasonal: Goa–Mopa, Nha Trang, Phuket, Sanya
Aero Nomad Airlines	Seasonal: Osh
Alrosa	Krasnodar, Mirny, Moscow–Vnukovo, Udachny
Aurora	Khabarovsk
Avia Traffic Company	Bishkek, Osh
Azerbaijan Airlines	Baku
Azur Air	Seasonal charter: Antalya, Hambantota–Mattala, Hurghada, Nha Trang, Pattaya, Phuket
Centrum Air	Andizhan, Namangan, Tashkent
Flydubai	Dubai–International
FlyOne	Tashkent
Georgian Airways	Tbilisi
Myanmar Airways International	Mandalay, Yangon
NordStar	Norilsk, Krasnoyarsk
Pobeda	Moscow–Sheremetyevo, Moscow–Vnukovo
Red Wings Airlines	Seasonal: Batumi
Rossiya Airlines	Krasnoyarsk–International, Saint Petersburg, Sochi
RusLine	Moscow–Vnukovo
S7 Airlines	Abakan, Almaty, Andizhan, Antalya, Aşgabat, Astana, Baku, Barnaul, Beijing–Daxing, Bishkek, Blagoveshchensk, Bratsk, Bukhara, Cheboksary, Chelyabinsk, Chengdu, Chita, Colombo-Bandaranaike (begins 20 December 2026), Dushanbe, Fergana, Gorno-Altaysk, Guangzhou (resumes 21 December 2026), Irkutsk, Istanbul, Izhevsk, Kaliningrad, Kazan, Kemerovo, Khabarovsk, Khanty-Mansiysk, Khujand, Krasnodar, Krasnoyarsk–International, Kyzyl, Magadan, Makhachkala, Malé, Mineralnye Vody, Mirny, Moscow–Domodedovo, Nadym, Neryungri, Nizhnevartovsk, Nizhny Novgorod, Norilsk, Novokuznetsk, Novy Urengoy, Noyabrsk, Omsk, Orenburg, Osh, Öskemen, Perm, Petropavlovsk-Kamchatsky, Pevek, Phuket, Qarağandy, Saint Petersburg, Salekhard, Samara, Samarqand, Saratov, Shanghai-Pudong, Sochi, Surgut, Şymkent, Talakan, Tashkent, Tomsk, Tyumen, Ufa, Ulan-Ude, Ulyanovsk–Baratayevka, Ürümqi (resumes 29 March 2027), Ust Kut (begins 1 December 2026), Vladivostok, Volgograd, Xi'an, Yakutsk, Yekaterinburg, Yerevan, Yuzhno-Sakhalinsk; Seasonal: Bangkok–Suvarnahumi, Dubai–Al Maktoum (suspended), Dubai–International (suspended), Issyk-Kul
SCAT Airlines	Şymkent
Shirak Avia	Yerevan
Smartavia	Moscow–Sheremetyevo, Saint Petersburg
Somon Air	Dushanbe
Utair	Irkutsk, Krasnoyarsk–International, Moscow–Vnukovo, Surgut
UVT Aero	Tobolsk, Yekaterinburg
Uzbekistan Airways	Andizhan, Fergana, Tashkent
VietJet Air	Seasonal charter: Da Nang
Vietjet Qazaqstan	Astana
Yakutia Airlines	Moscow–Vnukovo, Neryungri, Yakutsk
Yamal Airlines	Novy Urengoy, Salekhard

=== Cargo ===
Airlines	Destinations
Aviastar-TU	Hangzhou
Russian Post	Harbin, Zhengzhou
S7 Cargo	Magadan, Moscow-Domodedovo, Norilsk, Petrpavlovsk-Kamchatsky, Ürümqi, Yuzhno-Sakhalinsk

== Statistics ==
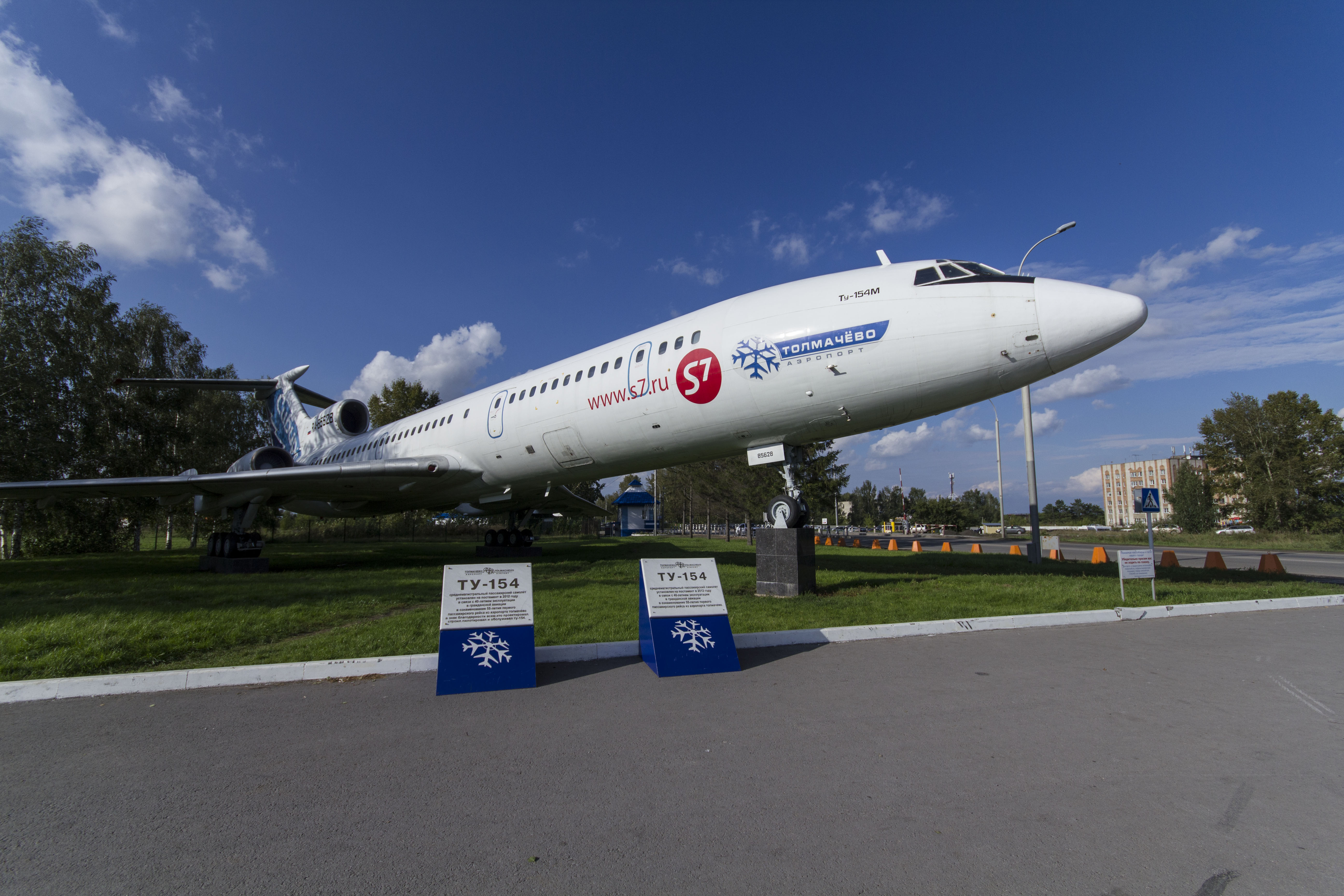
The monument from Tupolev Tu-154M of S7 Airlines at Tolmachevo Airport

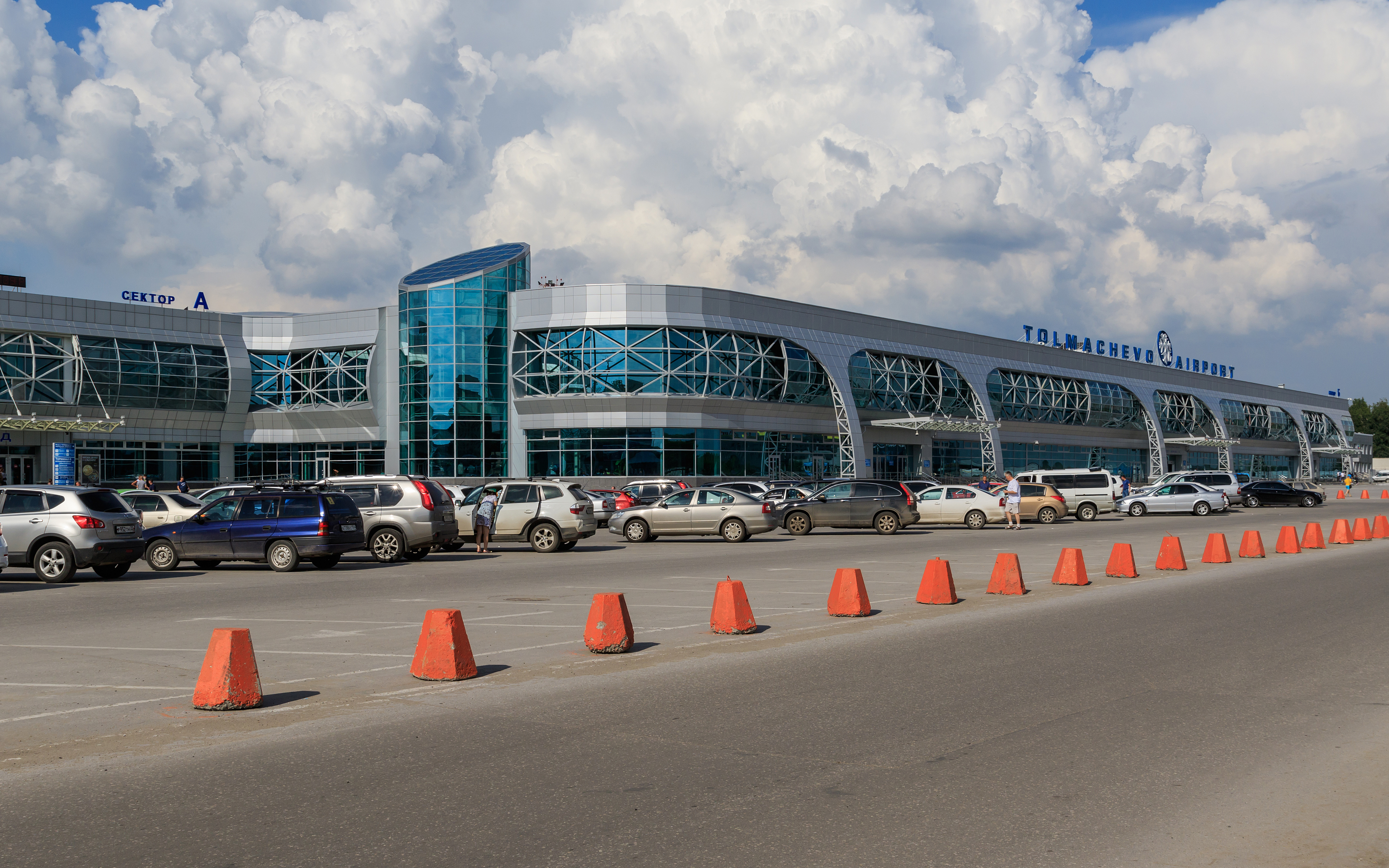
Tolmachevo Airport outside view of joint terminal (left - domestic section A, right - international section B) before construction of the new terminal in 2020

Novosibirsk-Tolmachevo Airport Passenger Traffic Statistics
Year (month)	Domestic	% change	International	% change	Total	% change
2021*	6,046,000	▲48.0%	715,000	▲31.0%	6,761,000	▲46.0%
2020	4,087,771	▼16.6%	546,395	▼70.4%	4,634,166	▼31.3%
2019	4,903,212	▲14.5%	1,843,939	▲13.3%	6,747,151	▲14.2%
2018	4,281,799	▲20.6%	1,627,279	▲11.7%	5,909,078	▲18.0%
2017	3,550,375	▲17.7%	1,456,927	▲34.9%	5,007,302	▲22.2%
2016	3,017,226	▲16.0%	1,080,264	▼2.0%	4,097,490	▲10.6%
2015	2,600,974	▲7.0%	1,102,237	▼27.8%	3,703,211	▼6.4%
2014	2,431,238	▲10.9%	1,526,429	▼2.0%	3,957,667	▲5.6%
2013	2,191,304	▲8.7%	1,556,907	▲24.5%	3,748,211	▲14.7%
2012	2,015,767	▲13.7%	1,250,978	▲25.9%	3,266,745	▲18.1%
2011	1,772,566	▲12.5%	993,316	▲44.7%	2,765,884	▲22.3%
2010	1,575,185	▲15.3%	686,442	▲56.8%	2,261,630	▲25.3%
2009	1,366,500	▼20.3%	437,800	▼6.3%	1,804,297	▼14.5%
2008	1,643,900	▲12.7%	465,500	▲12.4%	2,109,424	▲12.6%
2007	1,459,200	▲12.3%	414,300	▲16.0%	1,873,496	▲13.1%
2006	1,299,700	▲2.5%	357,200	▼6.2%	1,656,901	▲0.5%
2005	1,268,500	▲5.7%	379,400	▲11.5%	1,647,940	▲7.0%
2004	1,199,500	▲11.7%	340,300	▲17.3%	1,539,777	▲12.9%
2003	1,073,900	▲12.7%	290,000	▲0.4%	1,363,952	▲9.9%
^{*}Preliminary Data. Source: Tolmachevo media centre

Busiest domestic routes from Tolmachevo Int. Airport (2013)
Rank	City	Passengers	Growth 2013/2012
1	Moscow	1,073,265	▲5%
2	Saint Petersburg	152,068	▲15%
3	Khabarovsk	122,150	▲24%
4	Vladivostok	95,864	▲15%
5	Yakutsk	69,555	▲11%
6	Irkutsk	66,751	▲69%
7	Yekaterinburg	44,091	▲17%
8	Mirny	42,246	▲4%
9	Surgut	38,006	▲14%
10	Nizhnevartovsk	35,465	▼18%

Busiest international routes from Tolmachevo Int. Airport (2013)
Rank	City	Country	Passengers	Growth 2013/2012
1	Bangkok	Thailand	215,408	▲25%
2	Antalya	Turkey	143,906	▲13%
3	Bishkek	Kyrgyzstan	100,635	▲22%
4	Phuket	Thailand	93,134	▲49%
5	Osh	Kyrgyzstan	80,041	▲8%
6	Beijing	China	77,026	▼14%
7	Dubai	United Arab Emirates	50,564	▲36%
8	Khujand	Tajikistan	47,645	▲13%
9	Ürümqi	China	41,845	▼6%
10	Dushanbe	Tajikistan	41,470	▲4%

== Ground transportation ==
Public transportation to the city is provided by a number of bus routes, as well as by private and municipal taxis. Shuttle bus service runs also between the airport and the Ob railway station at the Trans-Siberian Railway - a stop for Elektrichka local commuter trains and some long-distance trains in the direction of Omsk.

Since 1 June 2024 direct buses to Kuzbas' Mezhdurechensk with additional stops in Myski, Novokuznetsk, Belovo and Leninsk-Kuznetsky are available on daily basis.

== See also ==
- Novosibirsk Elitsovka Airport
- Novosibirsk Severny Airport
- List of the busiest airports in Russia
- List of the busiest airports in the former USSR
- List of military airbases in Russia

== Other sources ==
- Novosibirsk Tolmachevo Airport at Russian Airports Database
