= Ignatyevo Airport =

Airport in Russia

Count Nikolay Muravyov-Amursky Ignatyevo Airport Аэропорт Игнатьево им. Николай Николаевич Муравьёв-Амурский
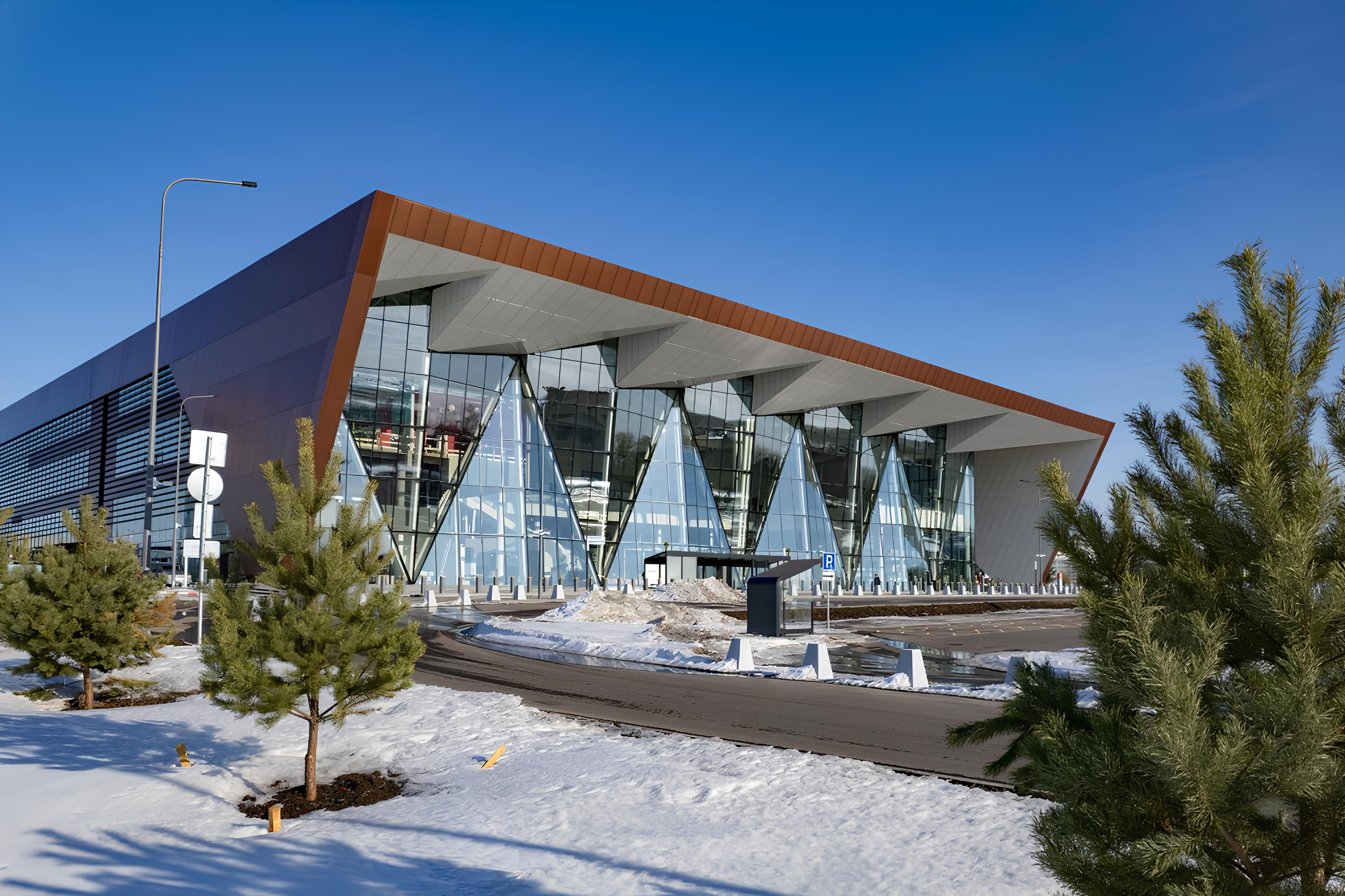
- IATA: BQS; ICAO: UHBB; LID: БГЩ

Summary
- Owner: Amur Oblast
- Operator: Novaport
- Serves: Blagoveshchensk
- Location: Ignatyevo, Amur Oblast, Russia
- Elevation AMSL: 640 ft (200 m)
- Coordinates: 50°25′30″N 127°24′48″E
- Website: ar-bqs.ru

Map
- Location of airport in Amur Oblast

Runways
Direction	Length		Surface
Direction	m	ft	Surface
18/36	3,000	9,843	Asphalt

Count Nikolay Muravyov-Amursky Ignatyevo Airport (Russian: Аэропорт Игнатьево) (IATA: BQS, ICAO: UHBB) is an international airport in Amur Oblast, Russia, located near the village of Ignatyevo 20 kilometers (12 mi) north-west of Blagoveshchensk. The large airport services up to medium-sized airliners with parking space for 44 civilian aircraft, and conducts 24-hour flight operation.

== History ==
In 1958, the Amur Regional Committee of the Communist Party of the Soviet Union made a decision on the construction and development of an airport for the city of Blagoveshchensk. The construction of Ignatyevo Airport began in 1959 next to the village of Ignatyevo, after which the airport is named. The first terminal was made of wood and was located approximately on the spot where the current terminal stands. The airport was opened on 9 January 1960.

By 1962, services connecting Khabarovsk, Vladivostok, Chita and Irkutsk had been established. In January 1963, flights to Moscow had been established through the use of Ilyushin Il-18 aircraft, with a stopover in Krasnoyarsk.

On 18 August 1965, a new terminal was opened, with a capacity of 200 passengers per hour.

On 1 January 1983, reconstruction of the airports runway was completed, allowing for the operation of Tupolev Tu-154 aircraft.

During the early 1990s the airport's activity declined as the new emerging Russian state was suffering from economic decline following the dissolution of the Soviet Union.

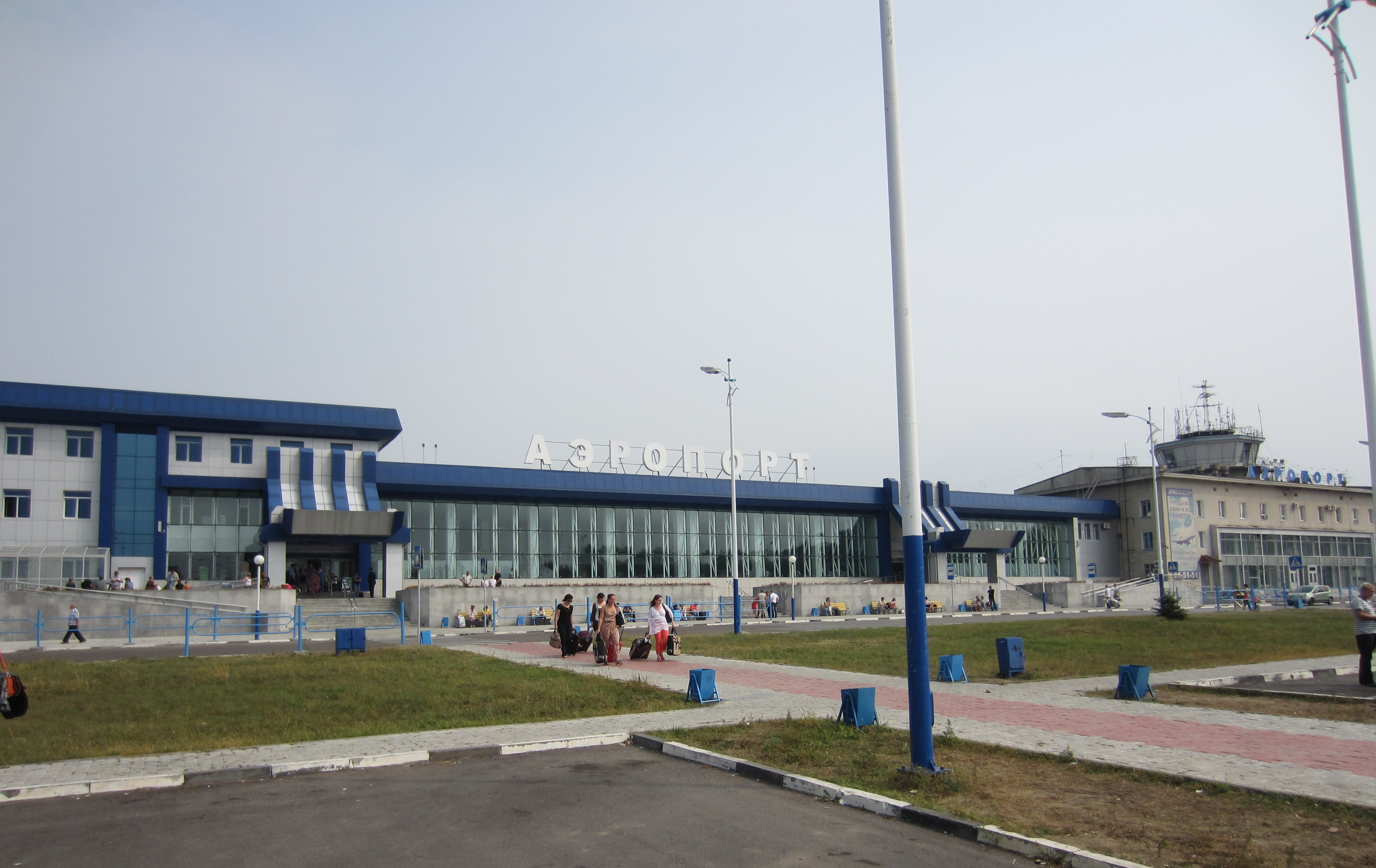
Ignatyevo Airport in 2012.

In July 1997, the Governor of Amur Oblast signed a decree on the establishment of Airport Blagoveshchensk, a unitary enterprise fully owned by the government of Amur Oblast to own and operate Ignatiyevo Airport. In the 2000s, a partial reconstruction of the airport began in order to increase the volume of transportation and improve the quality of passenger service.

In 2007, plans for the construction of a new terminal was resumed after being halted in 1988. On 30 December 2010, the new terminal was commissioned. The old terminal, built in the 1960s, would remain in use for surge capacity.

=== Reconstruction ===
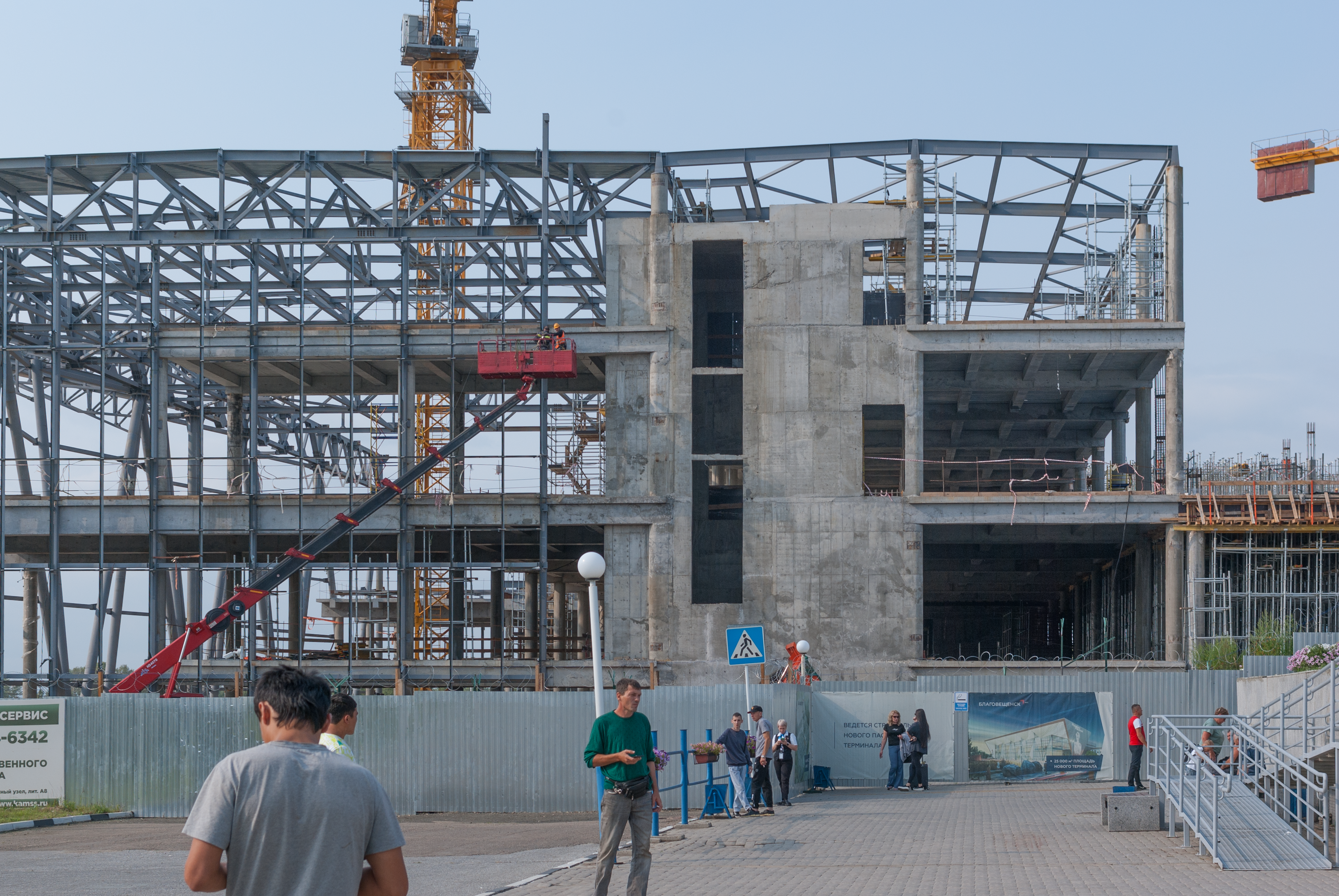
New terminal under construction in 2024.

In 2018, it was reported that the airport would undergo an extensive reconstruction, occurring in two stages. The first stage would consist of a new runway catering to wide-body aircraft, with the second stage involving the construction of a new airport terminal. The runway would be 3,000 metres long and 45 metres wide.

In 2019 the airport was officially named after Count Nikolay Muravyov-Amursky. In the same year, construction of the new runway began.

On 23 April 2021, the Government of Amur Oblast alongside "ABS Blagoveshchensk" LLC and Novaport signed on agreement on the development of Blagoveshchensk International Airport. The total investment in the project would exceed seven billion rubles.

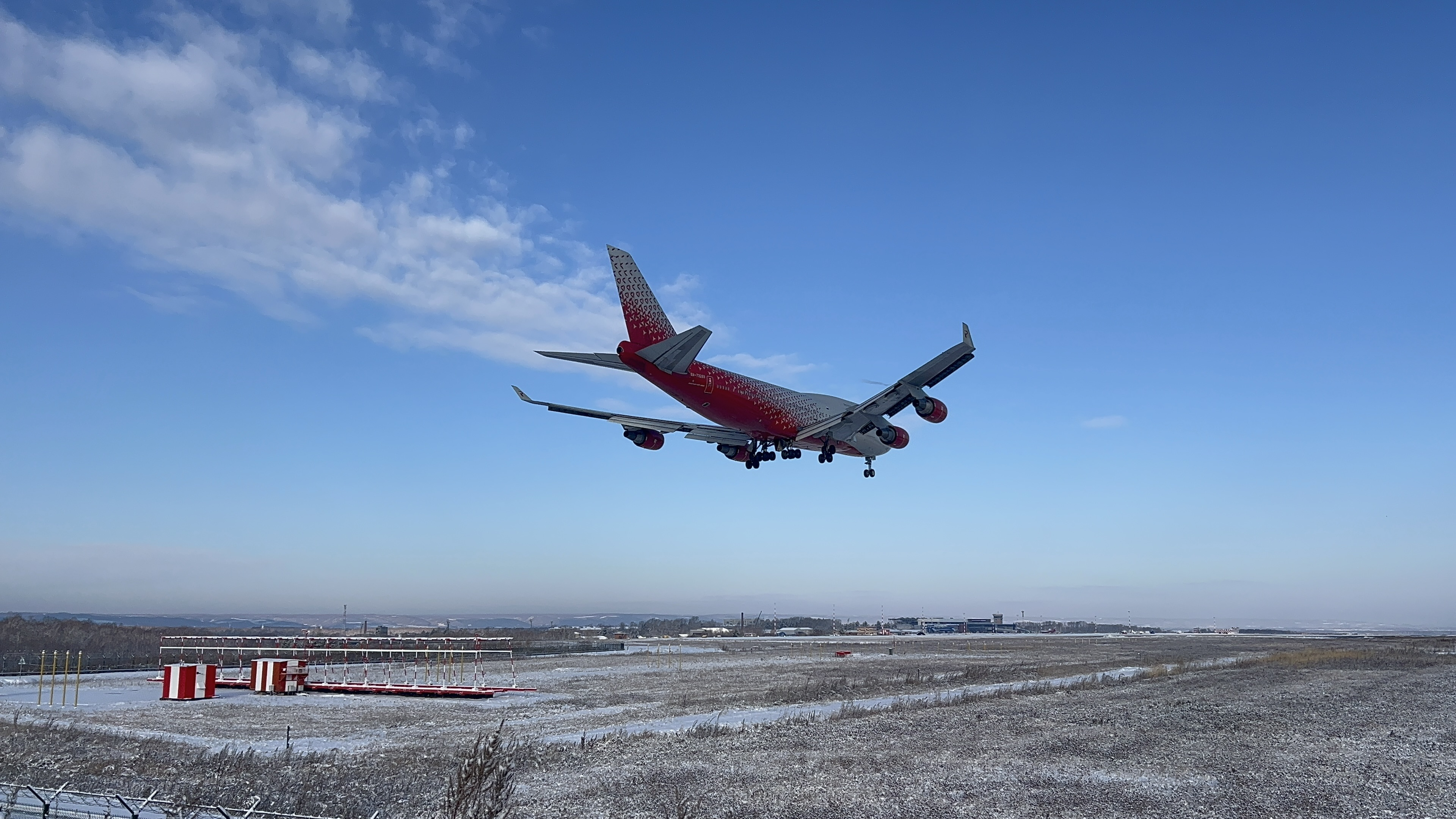
Rossiya Airlines Boeing 747-400 landing on the new runway.

On 25 December 2023, the new runway was put into operation. The old runway was decommissioned and converted into further aircraft parking. As part of reconstruction work, modern lighting, radio and meteorological equipment was installed. The runway was inaugurated with the arrival of a Rossiya Airlines Boeing 737 from Krasnoyarsk. On 30 October 2025, a Rossiya Airlines Boeing 747-400 landed at Ignatyevo, marking the arrival of the first wide-body aircraft at the airport.

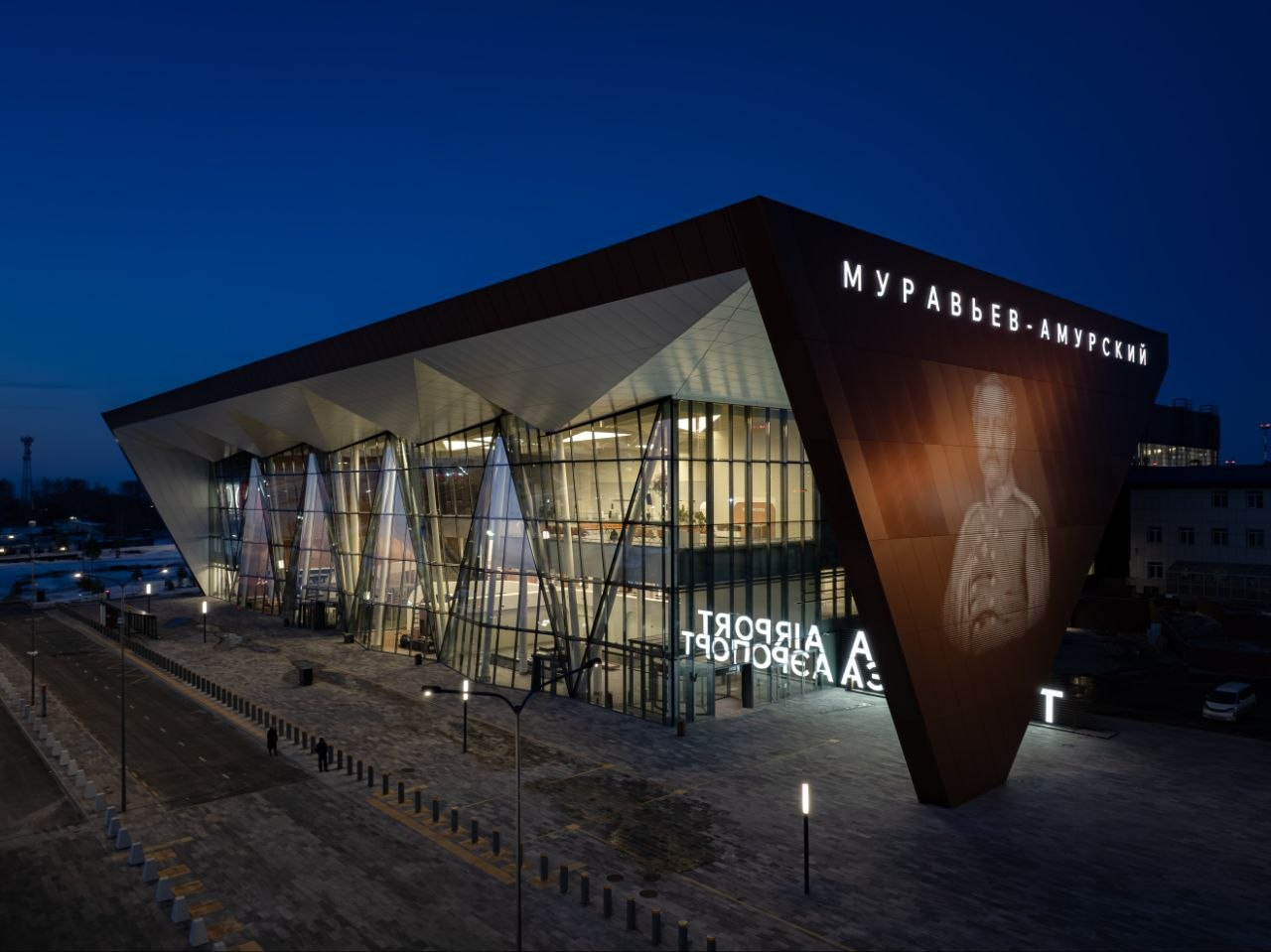
New terminal at Ignatyevo in March 2026.

Construction of a new passenger terminal to align with expanding demand began on 27 May 2023, with assistance from VEB.RF. By late 2024, a rebuilt apron, airport perimeter and fire station had been completed. On 28 March 2026, the new terminal was opened. It is over three times larger than the previous terminal, capable of processing 600 domestic passengers, and 400 international passengers per hour. The new terminal contains twenty three check-in counters, four jetways and three baggage carousels. A new parking area with 600 spaces and a cargo terminal capable of processing six thousand tons a year was also built. Designed by ASADOV Architectural Studio, who had previously worked on new terminals at Perm International Airport and Alexei Leonov Kemerovo International Airport, the terminal is built in neomodern style incorporating a series of triangular shapes. The old terminal will be retained, with a new plaza built between the two terminals, containing a digital display of Count Nikolay Muravyov-Amursky.

== Airlines and destinations ==
Airlines	Destinations
Amur Aviabase	Oktyabrsky, Svobodny
Aurora	Khabarovsk, Tynda, Zeya
Azur Air	Seasonal charter: Nha Trang, Pattaya, Phuket
IrAero	Chita, Irkutsk, Kalibo, Magadan, Neryungri, Sanya (begins 11 December 2026), Ulan-Ude, Vladivostok; Seasonal: Harbin
Rossiya	Khabarovsk, Krasnoyarsk–International, Moscow–Sheremetyevo, Vladivostok, Yuzhno-Sakhalinsk
S7 Airlines	Moscow–Domodedovo, Novosibirsk
Ural Airlines	Moscow–Domodedovo, Yekaterinburg
VietJet Air	Seasonal charter: Nha Trang, Da Nang, Hanoi
Yakutia Airlines	Seasonal charter: Qinhuangdao

== Accidents ==
On 8 August 2011, IrAero Flight 103, operated by Antonov An-24 RA-46561 overran the runway on landing. Of the five crew and 31 passengers on board, twelve people were injured.

== See also ==
- List of airports in Russia
- List of military airbases in Russia
