= Abakan International Airport =

Airport in Russia

Abakan International Airport Абағанның Аралых чонар Аэропорт

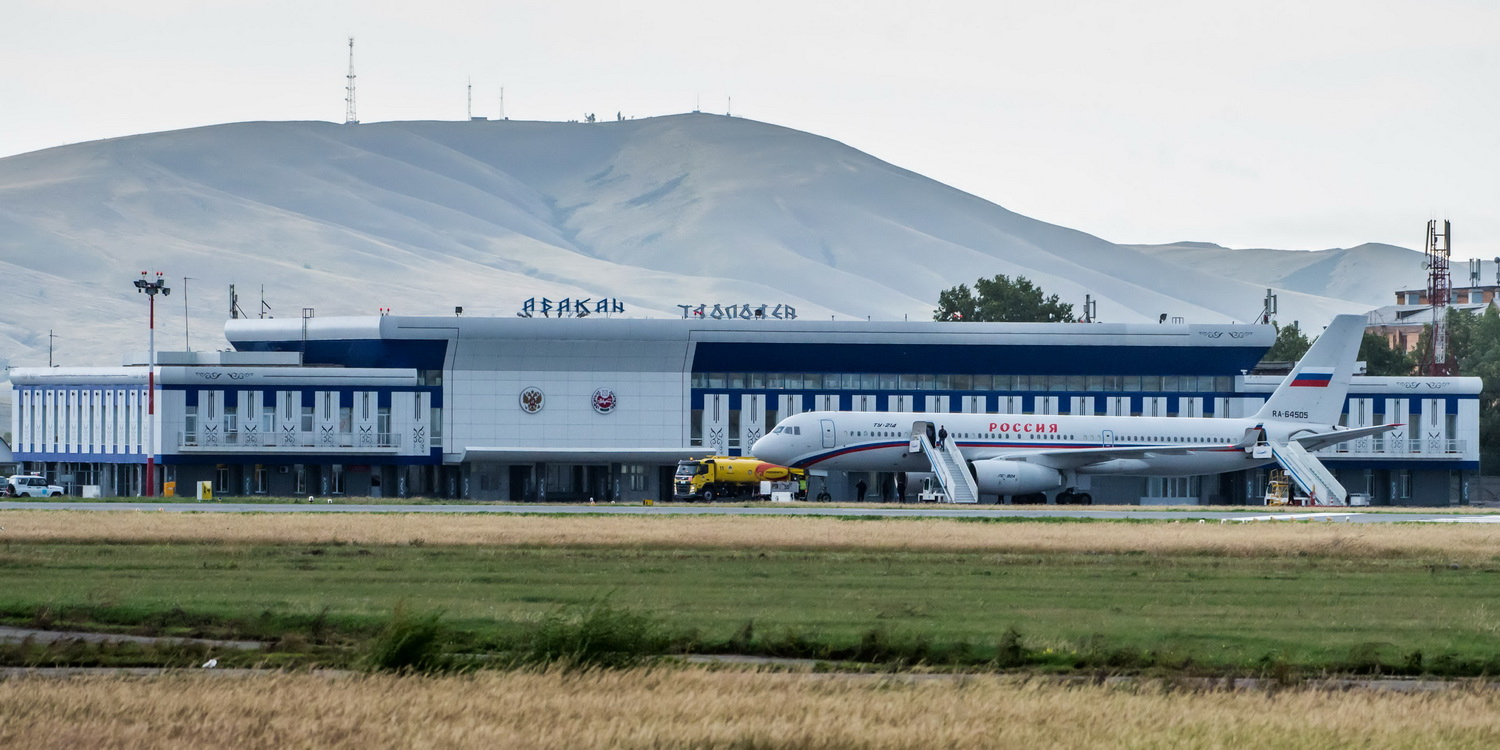
- IATA: ABA; ICAO: UNAA

Summary
- Airport type: Public
- Operator: JSC "Aeroport Abakan"
- Serves: Abakan
- Location: Abakan, Russia
- Elevation AMSL: 253 m / 830 ft
- Coordinates: 53°44′36″N 91°23′09″E
- Website: Official website

Map
- Location of airport in Khakassia

Runways
| Direction | Length | | Surface |
| Direction | m | ft | Surface |
|---|---|---|---|
| 02/20 | 3,250 | 10,600 | bitumen concrete |

Abakan International Airport (Khakas: Абағанның Аралых чонар Аэропорт, Russian: Международный Аэропорт Абакан, IATA: ABA, ICAO: UNAA) is an airport located in Abakan, Republic of Khakassia, Russia.

The airport is located to the north of the city not far from the city limits. City bus and trolleybus connections are available. It is the only airport in the region (Khakassia and south of Krasnoyarsk Krai) suitable for all types of aircraft.

== History ==
On 1 March 1993, the PI “Abakan Airport” was established as independent enterprise by standing out of Abakan Aviation Enterprise; the Public Property Management Committee in cooperation with the Transport Aviation Department and Council of Ministers of Republic of Khakassia adopted this decision. By 1993, the Transport Aviation Department together with the Government of the Republic succeeded to perform a significant preparatory workload for the international sector and finally, to achieve the international airport statute. In 1996, the “Abakan Airport” OJSK was established. In 1999 and 2000, the Abakan Airport won the competition “The Best Airport of the CIS countries” carried out by the “Airport” Association.

== Airlines and destinations ==
=== Passenger ===
| Airlines | Destinations |
|---|---|
| Aeroflot | Moscow–Sheremetyevo |
| IrAero | Seasonal: Chita, Irkutsk |
| KrasAvia | Krasnoyarsk–Cheremshanka, Krasnoyarsk–International |
| NordStar | Norilsk; Seasonal: Saint Petersburg, Sochi |
| Red Wings Airlines | Yekaterinburg |
| S7 Airlines | Moscow–Domodedovo, Novosibirsk |

=== Cargo ===
| Airlines | Destinations |
|---|---|
| Grizodubova Air Company | Chelyabinsk, Tianjin |
| Volga-Dnepr | Guangzhou, Moscow-Domodedovo, Shanghai-Pudong, Tianjin |

== Accidents and incidents ==
On 7 March 1965, an Aeroflot Li-2 operating as Aeroflot Flight 542 (Abakan to Kyzyl) crashed shortly after takeoff from Abakan.

On 27 November 1996, 8 minutes after taking off from Abakan Airport, an Ilyushin Il-76 transport aircraft (registered RA-78804) crashed into a mountain near Minusinsk on the right bank of Yenisey river. The aircraft transported consumer goods and food. Everyone on board (23 people, including 13 passengers) died. The cause of the crash was that the aircraft was overloaded and climbed very slowly.

== See also ==
- List of airports in Russia
