= Civil Defense Academy of the Ministry of Emergency Situations =

Government professional school in Khimki, Russia

- Академия гражданской защиты МЧС России; АГЗ МЧС России
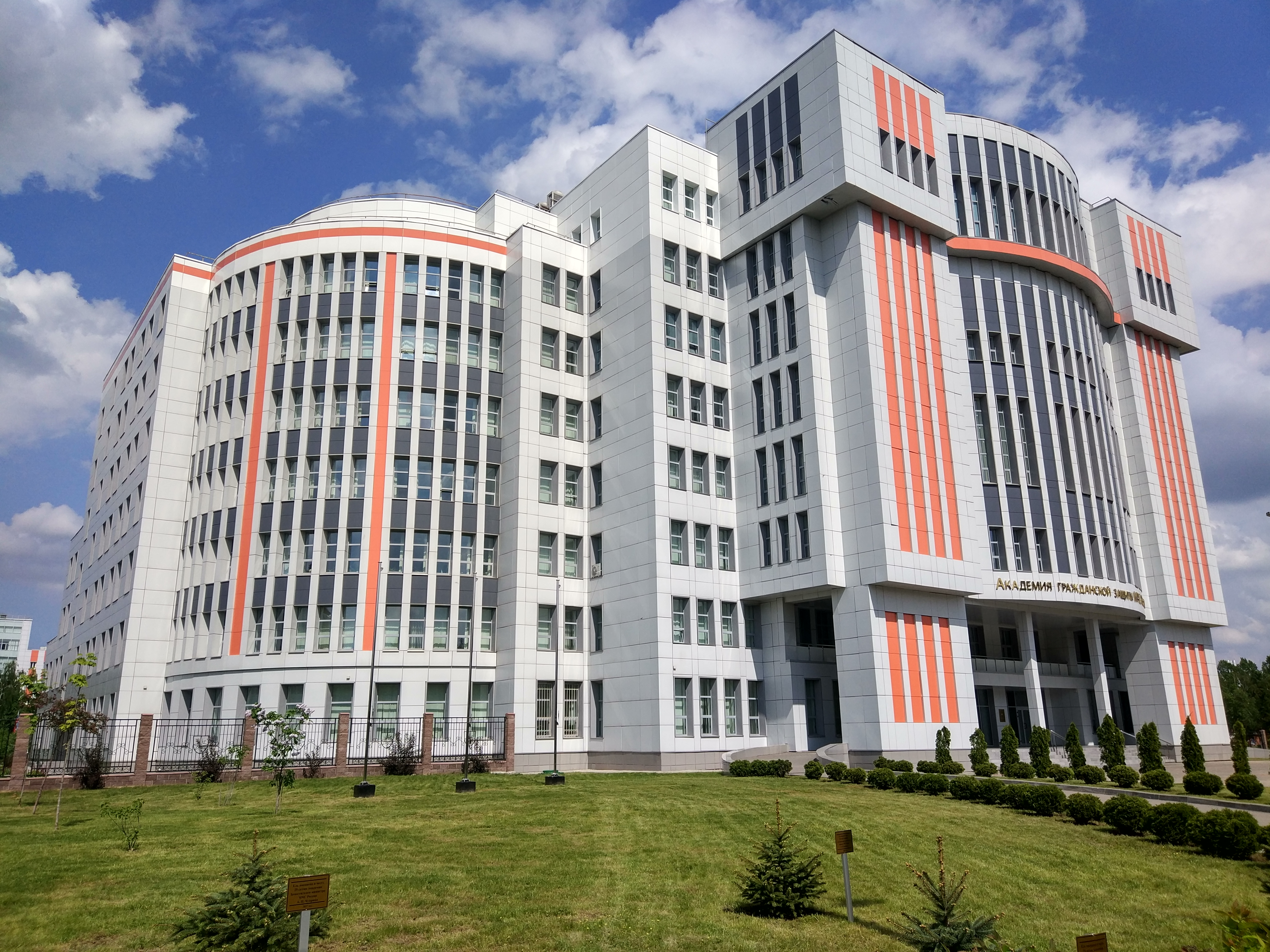
- Type: State university
- Established: 25 October 1933
- Affiliations: EMERCOM of Russia
- Location: Moscow, Russia; 55°48′08″N 37°31′44″E
- Campus: Urban
- Language: Russian

The Civil Defence Academy of the Ministry of Emergency Situations of Russia (Russian: Академия гражданской защиты МЧС России; АГЗ МЧС России) is a state institution for the training of specialists in the Ministry of Emergency Situations (EMERCOM). As part of the Russian Emergencies Ministry, the academy trains troops (both officers and NCOs) for the service of the country's civil defence forces and disaster response services. It was founded in 1992 and is located in Novogorsk microdistrict of Khimki, in Moscow Oblast very close to Moscow.

== History ==
The Academy was established as the Command Officers' Training and Enhancement Courses of the Air Defence Forces on 25 October 1933 by orders of the People's Commissariat of Defence, the date of which is marked as the anniversary of the formation of the academy. It was reorganized into the Red Army Electrical School in 1935. On 20 January 1949, the Council of Ministers reorganized it into the Republican School for Advanced Training of Officers of the Local Air Defense Units (abbreviated to the MPVO). In 1961, the MPVO was transformed into the Civil Defense of the Soviet Union, with the school being renamed to the Central Courses for Advanced Training of Officers of the Civil Defense. In October 1983, the Presidium of the Supreme Soviet awarded the Order of the Red Star to the course. On 9 December 1992, Prime Minister Yegor Gaidar signed a government decree establishing the academy in the basis of the Central Command and Control Center and the Civil Defense Courses of the RSFSR. In May 1994, the university received the name Academy of Civil Defence of the EMERCOM of Russia. Since January 2016, it has been a Federal State Budgetary Educational Institution of Higher Education.

== Activities ==
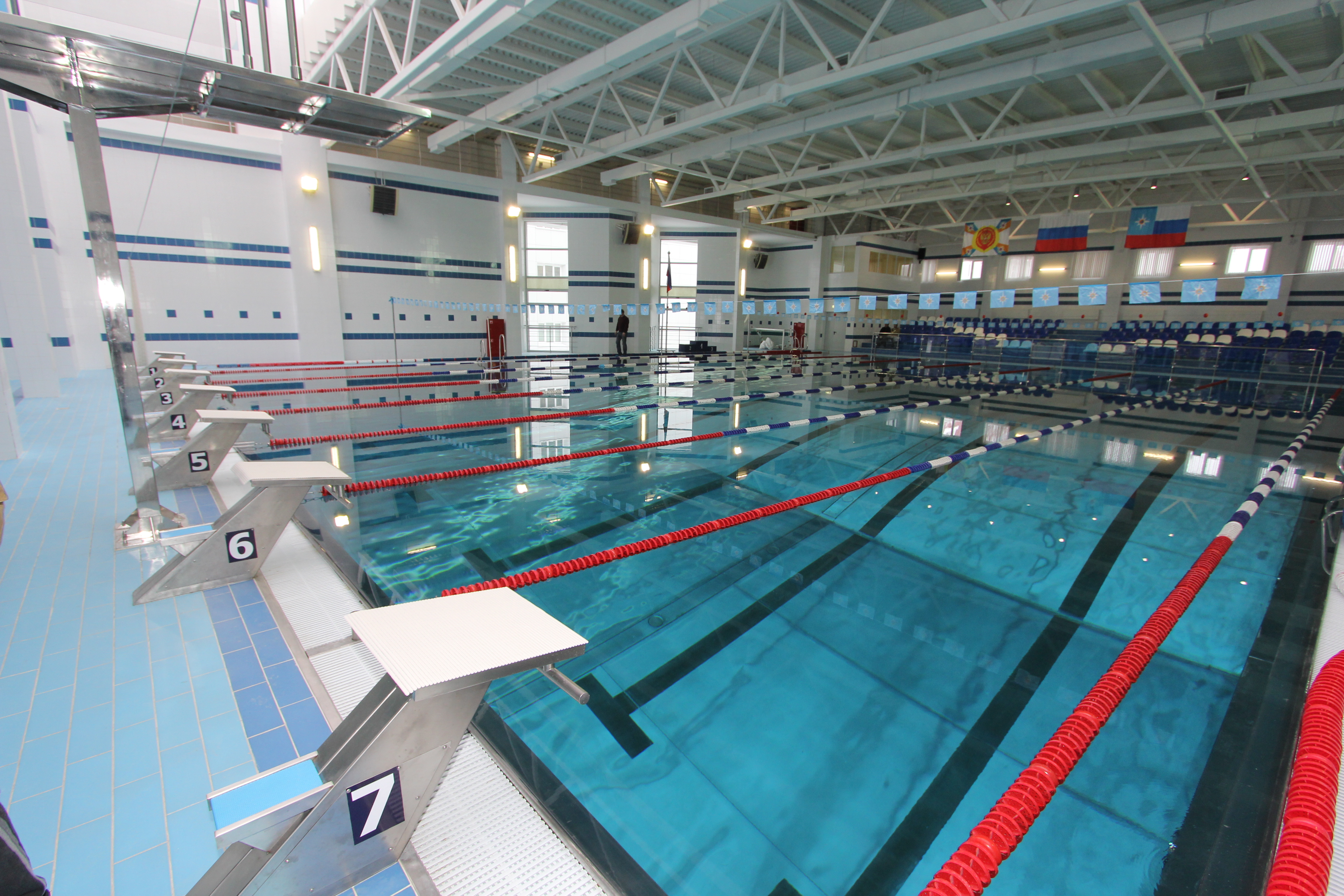
The academy pool.

Graduates of the academy have led the national response to civil catastrophes such as the Russian apartment bombings and the collapse of Transvaal Park. They have also provided assistance during natural disasters in Turkey, Colombia, South Ossetia, Afghanistan, Yugoslavia and other countries.

== Organization ==
Throughout its existence, the academy has trained around 6,000 specialists. Currently, over 2,500 people study at the academy. Training and teaching is provided through 36 core educational programs. The academy includes: 2 institutes, 6 faculties, 27 departments, 7 centers, along with the Cadet Fire and Rescue Corps, the training fire and rescue unit, the training and sports complex, the training and experimental complex, a clinic, and the central library of the Ministry of Emergency Situations. The Academy conducts training in postgraduate and postgraduate studies.

The Faculty for the Training of Foreign Specialists takes in officers and cadets of from 12 foreign countries: Abkhazia, Armenia, Azerbaijan, Belarus, Kazakhstan, Kyrgyzstan, Moldova, Mongolia, South Ossetia, Tajikistan, Uzbekistan, and Vietnam.

=== Institutes ===
- Institute for Special Training
- Institute for the Development of EMERCOM

=== Faculties ===
- Faculty of Senior Management
- Cadet Engineering Faculty
- Faculty of Engineering
- Faculty of Humanities
- Faculty of Distance Learning
- Faculty for the Training of Foreign Specialists

=== Centers ===
- Research Center
- Educational-Methodical Center
- Center for Teaching Aids
- Logistics Support Center
- Telecommunication center
- Press Service
- Cultural, Leisure and Educational Center

=== Departments ===
- Department of Operational Management
- Department of Biomedical and Environmental Protection
- Department of Engineering Protection for the Population
- Department of Tactics and General Military Disciplines
- Department of Rescue Operations
- Department of Radiation and Chemical Protection
- Department of Fire Safety
- Department of Rescue and Robotic Tools
- Department of Information Systems and Technologies
- Department of Information and Communication Technologies and Communication Systems
- Department of Operation of Transport-Technological Machines and Complexes
- Department of Informatics and Computer Engineering
- Department of Air Navigation and Unmanned Aircraft Systems
- Department of Economics, Management and Organization of Public Procurement
- Department of Pedagogy and Psychology
- Department of Legal Disciplines
- Department of State and Municipal Administration
- Department of Philosophy, History and Cultural Studies
- Department of Advertising and Public Relations
- Department of Economic Sustainability and Life Support Systems
- Department of Higher Mathematics
- Department of Foreign Languages
- Department of Mechanics and Engineering Graphics
- Department of Physical Training and Sports
- Department of Physics
- Department of Chemistry and Material Science
- Department of Mobilization Training

== Heads ==
- Lieutenant General Vladilen Sychev (1994 — 2004)
- Lieutenant General Pavel Popov (2004 — 12 February 2009)
- Colonel General Sergey Shlyakov (12 February 2009 — December 2012)
- Major General Alexander Mezhov (December 2012 — 22 August 2017)
- Major General Viktor Panchenkov (22 August 2017 — present)

== School traditions ==
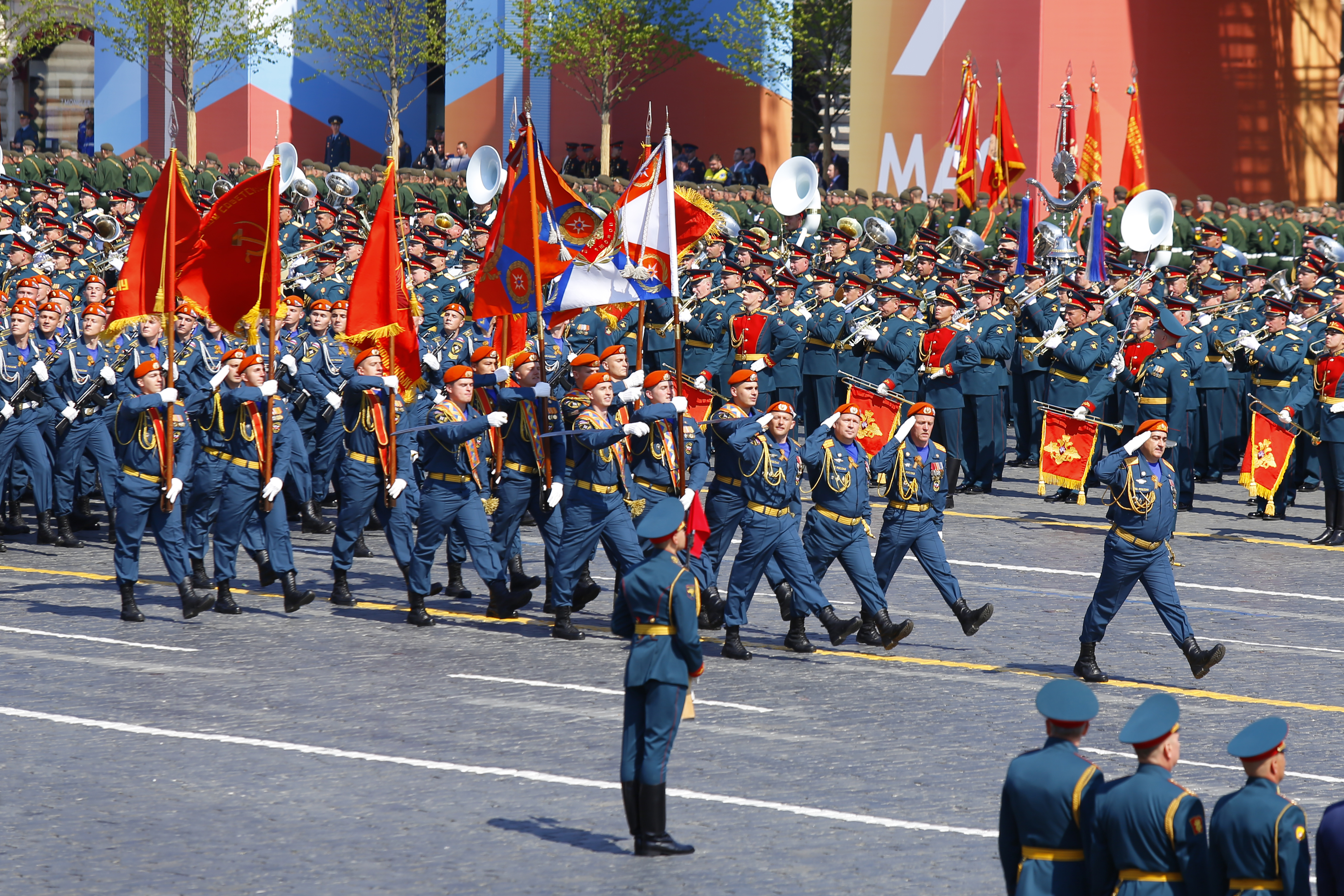
The academy parade contingent during the 2019 Moscow Victory Day Parade.

The academy maintains a cadet military band, which was founded on 1 September 1999 on the basis of a directive by Minister Sergey Shoygu on 16 July of that year. Cadets of the academy are annual participants in the Moscow Victory Day Parade on Red Square, representing all servicemen of the EMERCOM in a single parade battalion. For the first time since 2002, while EMERCOM detachments continued to march past in other major parades nationwide, cadets from the Civil Defense Academy of the Ministry of Emergency Situations were not to take part in the 2018 Moscow Victory Day Parade. However, this decision was rescinded.

== See also ==
- Military University of the Ministry of Defense of the Russian Federation
- Moscow University of the Ministry of Internal Affairs of Russia
- Moscow Border Institute of the FSB of the Russian Federation
- University of Civil Protection of the Ministry of Emergency Situations (Belarus)
