= Chara Airport =

Airport in Russia

- IATA: CZR; ICAO: UIAR; LID: ЧАР

Summary
- Airport type: Public
- Location: Chara
- Elevation AMSL: 2,201 ft / 671 m
- Coordinates: 56°54′48″N 118°16′12″E

Map
- Location of the airport in Zabaykalsky Krai Chara Airport (Russia)

Runways
Direction	Length		Surface
Direction	ft	m	Surface
06/24	6,562	2,000	Concrete

Chara Airport (IATA: CZR, ICAO: UIAR) is an airport in Russia located 2 km northeast of the rural locality of Chara. It has a wide paved runway and parking apron. It is a civilian airport.

== Airlines and destinations ==
Airlines	Destinations
IrAero	Chita

== See also ==
- List of airports in Russia
