= Pavel Popov =

Russian general

- Павел Попов
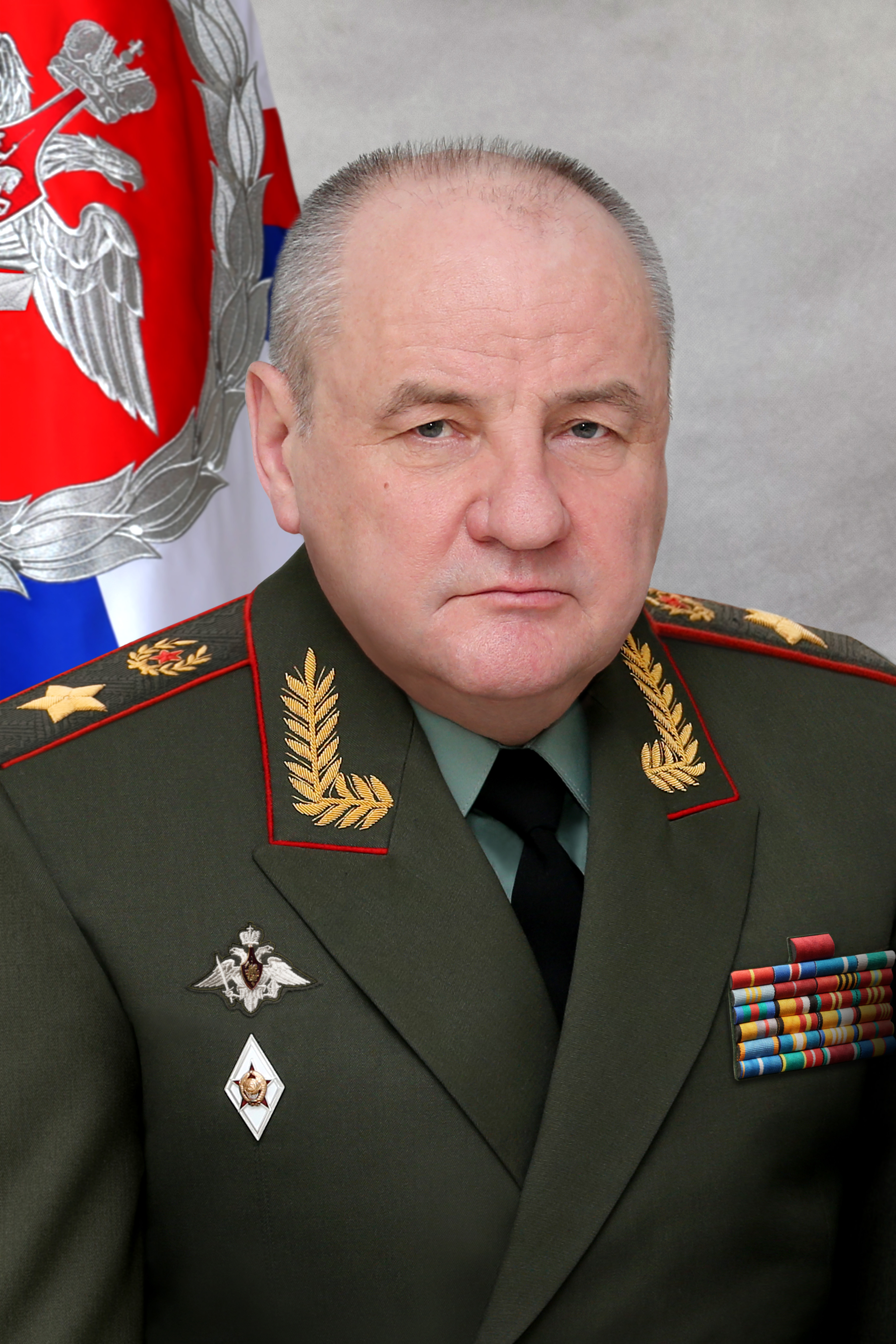
- Born: Pavel Anatolyevich Popov; 1 January 1957 (age 69); Krasnoyarsk, Russian SFSR, Soviet Union
- Military career
- Allegiance: Russia
- Branch: Russian Ground Forces
- Service years: 1974–2024

Pavel Anatolyevich Popov (Russian: Павел Анатольевич Попов; born 1 January 1957) is a retired Russian army officer who was the Deputy Minister of Defense between 7 November 2013 and 17 June 2024. He held the rank of army general in reserve, of which he was stripped on 10 April 2026 as part of his sentence for corruption.

Popov had previously been the Head of the Civil Protection Academy of the Ministry of Emergency Situations from 2004 to 2008, and the Deputy Minister of Emergency Situations from 2008 to 2013.

== Biography ==
Pavel Popov was born on 1 January 1957 in Krasnoyarsk. He is an ethnic Russian.

In 1978, he graduated from the Alma-Ata Higher Combined Arms Command School, after which he served in the Group of Soviet Forces in Germany of the Soviet Army. In 1986, he was transferred to the Far Eastern Military District as commander of a motorized rifle battalion.

After graduating from the Frunze Military Academy in 1990, Popov served as chief of staff - a deputy commander of the civil defense regiment of the Central Asian Military District from 1990 to 1993, a commander of the 493rd separate mechanized civil defense regiment from 1993 to 1996, and had been the First Deputy Head of the East Siberian Regional Center of the EMERCOM of Russia.

In 1996, Popov was appointed head of the East Siberian regional center of the EMERCOM of Russia, and in 1999 - the head of the Siberian regional center of the EMERCOM of Russia. In these positions, he directly supervised the rescue operations at the crash site of the A-310 airbus near the city of Mezhdurechensk in Kemerovo Oblast on 23 March 1994, the liquidation of the consequences of the earthquake on the Kuril Islands in 1994, and the Il-76 transport plane crash in the suburb of Abakan in 1996. Under his leadership, the delivery of humanitarian cargo and construction materials to the flood-affected city of Lensk in 2001, the extinguishing of large forest fires in Chita Oblast in 2003, and the elimination of the consequences of the earthquake in the Altai Republic in 2003, as well as other emergencies were carried out.

On 12 June 2004, by Decree of the President of Russia No. 751, Popov was awarded the military rank of colonel general.

In 2004, he was appointed head of the Civil Protection Academy of the Ministry of Emergency Situations and held this position until 2008.

From 2008 to 2013, Popov served as Deputy Minister of Emergency Situations.

According to the income statement, in 2012 Popov earned more than 5.2 million rubles.

In 2013, he was transferred to work at the Ministry of Defense and was appointed deputy minister. On 31 July 2013, the Minister of Defense, Sergey Shoygu, at the visiting meeting of the Collegium of the Ministry of Defense, announced that Popov would oversee the creation of the National Defense Management Center.

By the decree of the President of Russia, on 7 November 2013, Popov was appointed Deputy Minister of Defense Also, in connection with the appointment, he became a member of the collegium of the Russian Ministry of Defense.

He is one of the developers of the concept for a multi-level system of permanently operating Russian Defense Control Centers.

By the decree of the President of Russia on 11 December 2015, Popov was promoted to General of the Army.

=== Criminal prosecution ===
On 29 August 2024, Popov was detained by Russian authorities on corruption charges. He was accused of misappropriating funds intended for the Patriot Park to renovate his personal proprieties, as well as coercing the park's contractors to do work on his personal properties without pay. On 10 April 2026 he was sentenced to 19 years' imprisonment.

=== Sanctions ===
On 15 October 2020, the European Union sanctioned Popov in connection with the poisoning of Alexei Navalny. The sanctions include a ban on entry into the EU and on financial transactions, as well as an asset freeze.

He was sanctioned by the UK government in 2022 in relation to the Russo-Ukrainian War.
