= Aeroflot Flight 542 =

1965 aviation accident

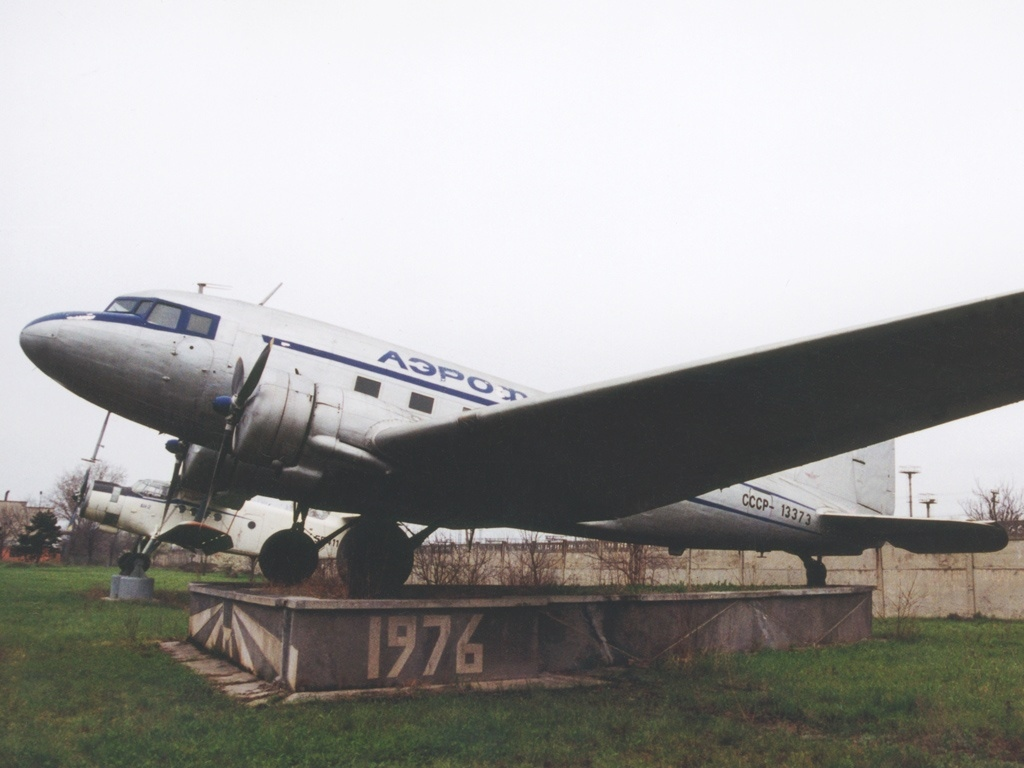
- An Li-2 similar to the one involved in the accident

Accident
- Date: 7 March 1965
- Summary: Severe turbulence, wing failure
- Site: Yermakovsky District, Krasnoyarsk Krai, Soviet Union

Aircraft
- Aircraft type: Lisunov Li-2
- Operator: Aeroflot
- Registration: CCCP-54971
- Flight origin: Abakan International Airport
- Destination: Kyzyl Airport
- Occupants: 31
- Passengers: 27
- Crew: 4
- Fatalities: 31
- Survivors: 0

On 7 March 1965, an Aeroflot Lisunov Li-2 operating as Aeroflot Flight 542 (Abakan to Kyzyl) crashed shortly after takeoff from Abakan. Approximately 40 minutes after departure, the aircraft banked left and dived into the mountains of the Krasnoyarsk Krai region of the USSR. All 31 passengers and crew died, making it the deadliest known accident involving the Li-2.

== Background ==
The aircraft involved was an Li-2 (a Soviet license-built version of the DC-3) with the serial number 23442810, produced by the Tashkent Aviation Plant in 1952 and transferred to the Main Directorate of the Civil Air Fleet. On September 24, the airliner received the tail number CCCP-Л4971 and was sent to the 132nd (Tuva) squadron of the Krasnoyarsk Civil Air Fleet Directorate. In 1959, it was converted to a passenger airliner, and re-registered as CCCP-54971. The aircraft had flown for 17,098 hours at the time of the accident.

== Accident ==
The plane had already flown from Kyzyl to Abakan, departing at 05:10 Local time (08:10 UTC) and landing safely at 06:55. 24 adult passengers and three children were on board the return flight, which weighed 10,946 kg (24,132 lb), exceeding the Maximum Takeoff Weight (MTOW) by 246 kg (542 lb), although the aircraft was still safe. At 07:04, Flight 542 had an on-time departure bound for Kyzyl with Captain Andrukhin Dmitry Fedorovich and First Officer Babich Nikolay Ilyich in command. The weather at the time was normal, with only moderate turbulence, and some early morning fog in the lowlands. At 07:41, the crew told Krasnoyarsk ATC that the plane had reached an altitude of 3,000 metres (9,800 ft) and was flying at 280 knots (520 km/h; 320 mph) (the maximum speed of the Lisunov Li-2 is 280 kilometres per hour (150 kn; 170 mph), wrong unit?). In response, the dispatcher instructed them to switch to communication with Kyzyl airport. The crew acknowledged receiving this information, which was the last radio transmission from the aircraft. After the latter transmission, several attempts to hail the aircraft were met with failure. At 07:45, the Li-2 crashed into a forested mountain slope at an altitude of 1,740 metres (5,710 ft). The aircraft was flying on a course of 240°, and was descending at a steep angle whilst rolling left. All 31 passengers and crew were killed.

== Investigation ==
Efforts to reach the crash site were hampered by a layer of snow up to 2–3 m (6.6–9.8 ft) thick, postponing activity until it melted. On June 1, the search got underway and scattered debris was found from the air 600 metres (660 yd) north of the crash site, including the left aileron and fairing, rudder, and the upper part of the keel. Part of the left end fairing sheathing was found 300 metres (330 yd) from the main crash site. Studying the wreckage, the investigators envisioned the following: flying through a pass, the craft got into a descending turbulent air stream and began to lose altitude. Acting on the controls, the pilots tried to pull the nose of the aircraft up, and due to the resulting high aerodynamic loads, the end fairing of the left wing collapsed. At the same time, on the right wing, the end fairing was deformed but did not separate. The separation of a part of the structure of the left wing immediately led to an imbalance in lift, so the aircraft turned sharply along the lift axis to the left, while lateral aerodynamic overloads appeared, as a result of which the rudder and part of the keel were separated. The airliner lost control and went into a dive.

During the investigation, it was noted that the wing showed no signs of damage, including corrosion and fatigue, that could have reduced the strength of the structure. The metal of the structure also met the requirements in terms of its quality. But at the same time, earlier in the course of the numerous static tests conducted, as well as during the operation of Li-2 aircraft, wing destruction was not revealed in the place where it happened with Flight 542. Only after a similar disaster that occurred on March 25, 1966, near Ramenskoye, which occurred for the same reason, did the commission came to the conclusion that the design of the left wing end fairing was unsafe.

== See also ==
- List of military aircraft of the Soviet Union and the CIS
- Douglas DC-3
- Boris Lisunov
