= IrAero Flight 103 =

Crashed Russian passenger flight

- Aftermath of the accident

Accident
- Date: August 8, 2011
- Summary: Controlled flight into terrain during approach due to pilot error
- Site: Ignatyevo Airport, Blagoveshchensk, Amur Oblast, Russia

Aircraft
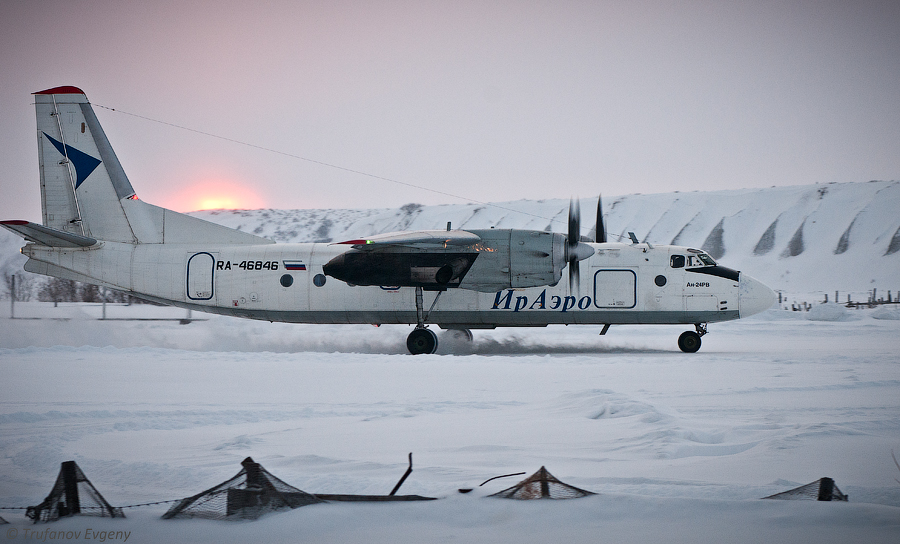
- An IrAero Antonov An-24 similar to the one involved
- Aircraft type: Antonov An-24RV
- Operator: IrAero
- Registration: RA-46561
- Flight origin: Irkutsk International Airport, Irkutsk, Irkutsk Oblast, Russia
- 1st stopover: Chita-Kadala International Airport, Chita, Zabaykalsky Krai, Russia
- Last stopover: Ignatyevo Airport, Blagoveshchensk, Amur Oblast, Russia
- Destination: Khabarovsk Novy Airport, Khabarovsk, Khabarovsk Krai, Russia
- Occupants: 41
- Passengers: 36
- Crew: 5
- Fatalities: 0
- Injuries: 15
- Survivors: 41

IrAero Flight 103 was a domestic passeger flight in Russia en routing Irkutsk - Chita - Blagoveshchensk - Khabarovsk. On August 8, 2011, while descending to Ignatyevo Airport, the Antonov An-24RV landed to the right of the runway threshold and crashed into a forest, injuring 15 of the 41 on board, but no one died.

== Background ==
=== Aircraft ===
The aircraft involved was an Antonov An-24RV manufactured on October 20, 1976, registered as RA-46561. Before the accident, the aircraft had logged in 12,346 flight hours and 13,767 cycles.

=== Crew members ===
- The captain of the flight was Vladimir Vladimirovich Ryabinkov, aged 52, who had logged in 11,555 flight hours, 6,722 of which were on the An-24.
- The co-pilot of the flight was Yuri Vladimirovich Tsarev, aged 42, who had logged in 3,268 flight hours, 575 of which were on the An-24.
- The flight engineer of the flight was Vitaly Vladimirovich Bessmertnaya, aged 29, who had logged in 1,036 flight hours, 465 of which were on the An-24. Nearly fourteen years later, Vitaly's wife, Anastasia Bessmertnaya, died as a flight attendant in the crash of Angara Airlines Flight 2311.
- On board also included a 21-year-old flight attendant, and a 40-year-old navigator, who had logged in 7,673 flight hours, 63 of which on the An-24.

== Accident ==
At 1:11 UTC (10:11 GMT +9), the plane took off from Chita-Kadala International Airport. Before descending to Ignatyevo Airport at 03:32 UTC (13:32 GMT +10), the crew had the ATIS received. The approach was executed in limited visibility, heavy rain, and storm-induced turbulence. At 04:14 UTC (14:14 GMT+10), the plane deviated to the right and landed into a forrest 200 meters from the runway. The impact cause the left wing and the landing gear to rupture and the engines to be damaged; kerosene spilled over the fuselage, but it didn't ignite due to rain.

During the impact, the flight engineer had shut down the engines. Since the fuselage was damaged, the exits of the aircraft was jammed, trapping the occupants inside the cabin. A passenger smashed the windows, creating a gap for two men to escape and help the other. A child was trapped between a seat and pulled out by a rescuer. In total, 12 passengers and 3 crew members (the captain, co-pilot and the flight engineer) were injured and was taken to the hospital.

A rescuer named Igor Chabykin admitted that the fact that the plane had no loss of life was a miracle.

== Investigation ==
The investigation was conducted by the Interstate Aviation Committee. On April 6, 2012, the final report of the accident was published.

The accident was concluded to be caused by pilot error. It is stated that the crew should have initiated a go-around when they have indications of aborting the landing (the ground proximity warning system was activated and the crew were unable to see the runway in hazardous condition) during the decision altitude. A contributory factor is the fact that the crew and the controller received inaccurate weather information.

== Aftermath ==
On November 14, 2012, the Blagoveshchensk City Court sentenced the captain, Vladimir Vladimirovich Ryabinkov, to 18 months of restricted freedom.

The crash had damaged the airline and the passenger over 4.7 million rubles

This is the second crash in a row of one month following the crash of Angara Airlines Flight 9007. Following the two accidents, Russian president at that time, Dmitry Medvedev called for the grounding of the Antonov An-24, but the Ministry of Transport (Russia) advised to only ground the regular flights of the aircraft, not the charter ones.
