= 2019 Moscow Victory Day Parade =

Russian military parade

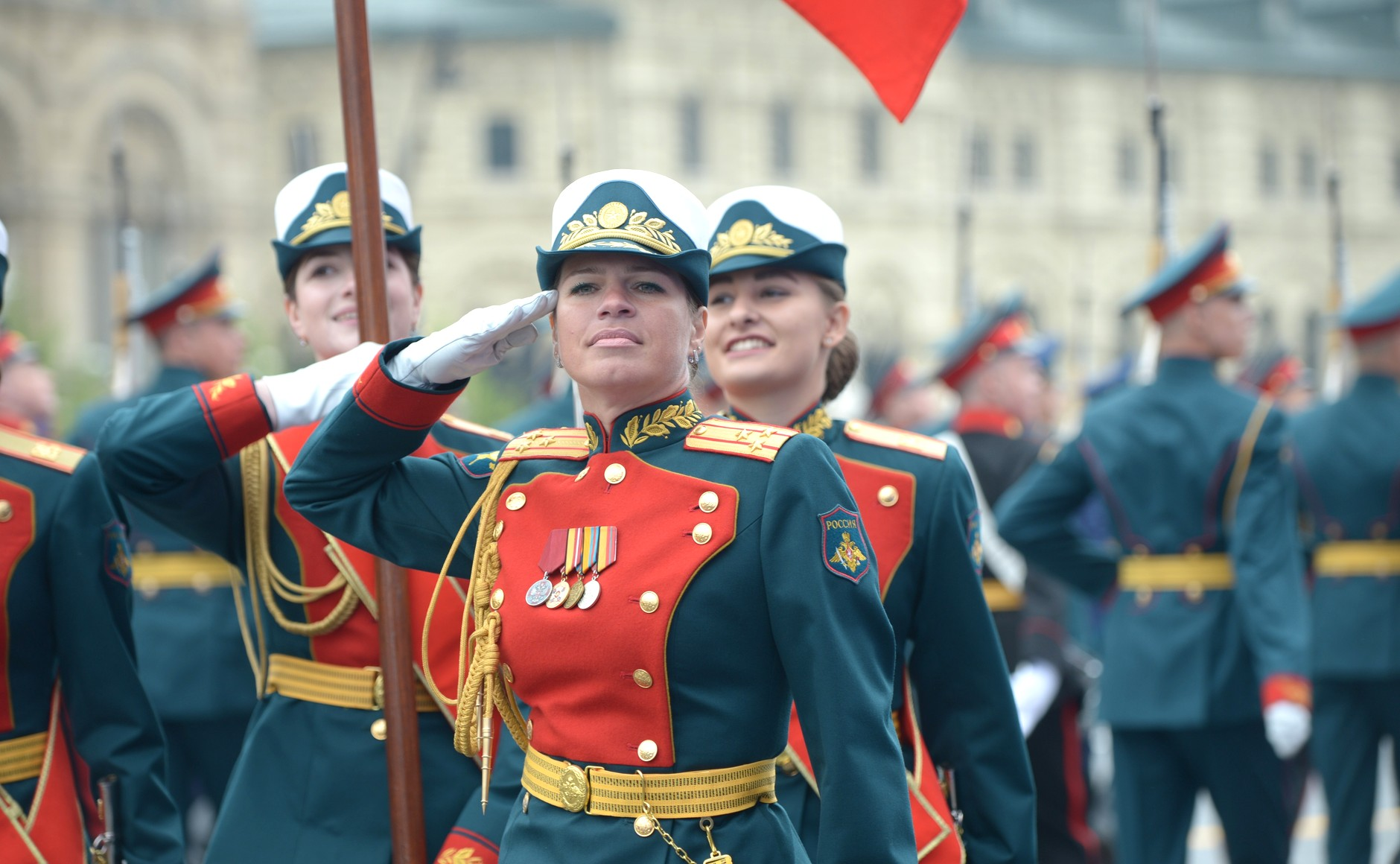
A female honour guard during the exhibition drill portion of the parade

The 2019 Moscow Victory Day Parade was a military parade that took place in Red Square in Moscow on 9 May 2019 to commemorate the 74th anniversary of the capitulation of Nazi Germany in 1945. It was the largest of all the parades held on this day in Russia and in many former republics of the Soviet Union.

The annual parade marks the Allied victory in World War II on the Eastern Front and commemorates the signing of the German act of capitulation to the Allies in Berlin, at midnight on 9 May 1945 (Russian time). The President of the Russian Federation, Vladimir Putin, delivered his sixteenth commemorative address to the nation after the parade inspection presided over by Minister of Defence General of the Army Sergey Shoygu, accompanied by the parade commander General of the Army Oleg Salyukov, Commander-in-Chief of the Russian Ground Forces, who participated in the parade for the sixth straight year.

== Particularities ==
As in past pre-jubilee parades, the parade serves as a preparatory celebration and a national kick-off to the 75th Diamond Jubilee celebrations of the Allied victory in Eastern Europe over the Axis powers (slated for May 2020), while also honouring the men and women of the Russian Armed Forces who have served in Syria. A specialized version of an Aurus Senat armoured limousine was expected to be introduced during the parade, serving the purpose of carrying the Defence Minister and the parade commander in Red Square, replacing the vehicles used in past parades. Nikolai Samokhvalov's Ceremonial Fanfare was sounded for the first time in close to 20 years prior to the speech of President Putin. It was previously performed at Victory Parades from 1990 to 2000.

For the fourth consecutive year the parade included a composite female cadet-regiment from the Military University of the Ministry of Defence, the Military Logistics Academy and the Military Space Academy; and for the first time female honour-guardsmen marched, together with another new participant, the Corps of Cadets of the Moscow Internal Affairs University, representing the men and women of the police of Russia, in addition to yet another new contingent debuting this year, the students of the Moscow Cadet Corps of the Investigative Committee of Russia. For the second consecutive year, the 154th Preobrazhensky Independent Commandant's Regiment's 1st Honour Guard Company took part in the exhibition drill segment of the parade, together with a drumline from the Moscow Military Music College, the second time it had been done since the parade of 2007 and a recent tradition which began in the 2001 parade. For the first time in 5 years, foreign leaders were not expected to participate in the parade as guests of honour; despite that, former President of Kazakhstan Nursultan Nazarbayev or Speaker of the National Council of Slovakia Andrej Danko attended.

It was the second parade where the flypast segment was cancelled due to bad weather, despite cloud seeding carried out to disperse clouds.

== Preparatory activities ==
Beginning in January 2019, preparations for the parade were well attended at the unit level. Individual unit practices were held in the various military installations for all the participating units in the national and local parades. Unit practices within Moscow Oblast itself started in early March in the Alabino field and other locations before the full-blown parade practice run-throughs for all the participating units commenced later in the month.

Officially the preparatory period for the parade kicked off on 26–27 March 2019 in the Alabino Training Range in Moscow Oblast, where the parade's more than 17,600 servicemen and women assembled to begin more than a month of practice rehearsals together with more than 190 vehicles from the Armed Forces, National Guard and the Ministry of Internal Affairs and around 3,800 crewmen. The first general practice began on 3 April 2019 in the Alabino Training Range with only the ground and mobile columns making their runs, as the separate practice runs for the air flypast column began in the airfield in Kubinka just kilometres away from Red Square.

On 17 April, the new parade limousines were test driven to ensure readiness for use during the final round of practice run-throughs and on the actual parade day. On 19 April, Moscow 24 featured an interview with some of the gunners from the Moscow Garrison's state artillery battery, which have also been preparing to fire the ceremonial 21-gun salutes during the playing of the national anthem.

=== Timeline for preparatory activities in Moscow ===
- 26–27 March towards 6 April – beginning of parade practice runs in Alabino, Moscow Oblast
- 2nd up to the 3rd week of April – General practice run-through in the Alabino training field, including flypast
- 4th week of April until 2 days before Victory Day - practice runs in Red Square right up to the general practice run
  - 29–30 April, 2–6 May – evening parade practice run-throughs
  - 4–5 May – Air flypast practice runs
  - 7 May – the general practice run at 10 am MST (livestreamed)

== Full order of the 2019 parade ==
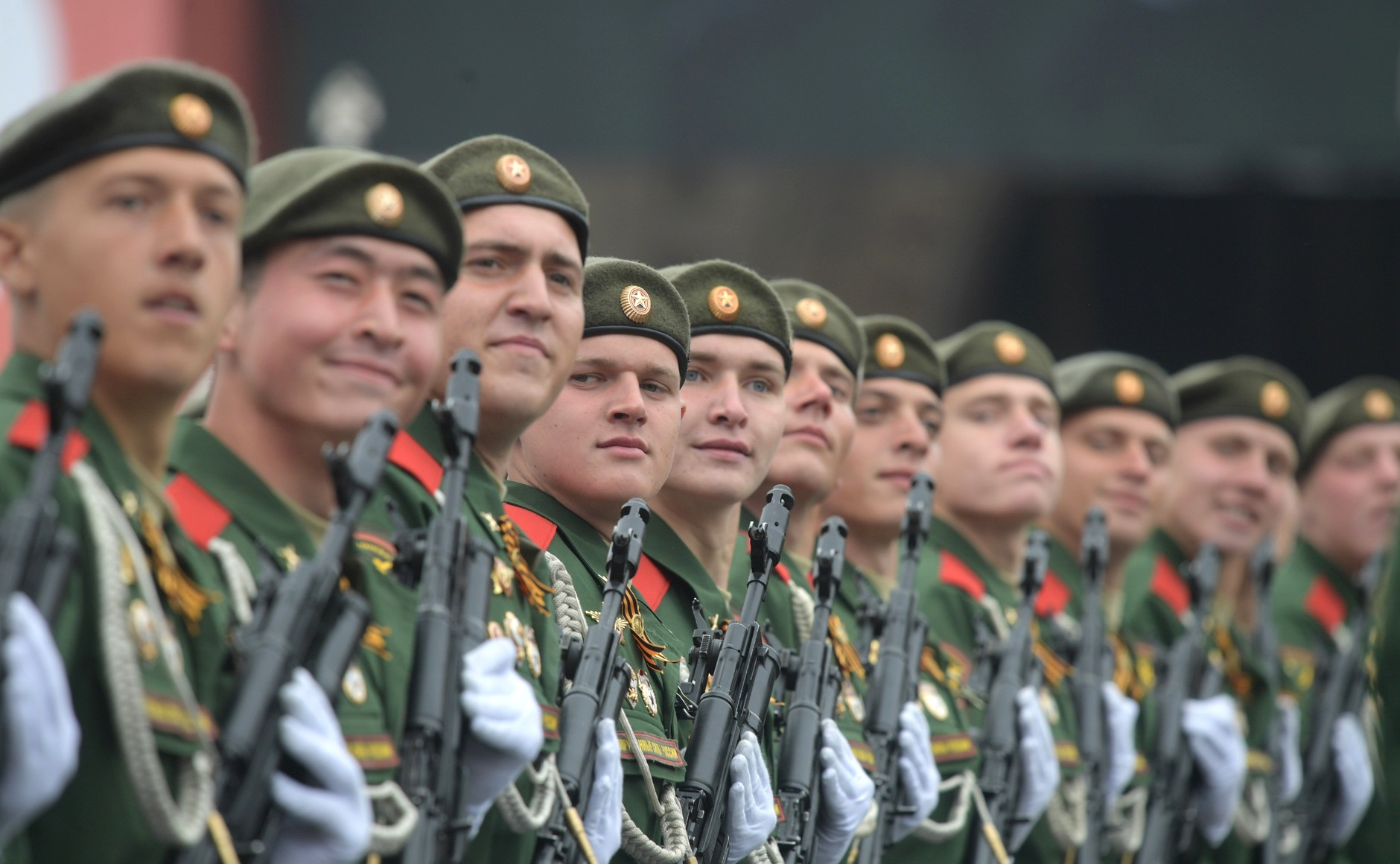
A contingent of the Russian Ground Forces during the parade.

Bold indicates first appearance, italic indicates multiple appearances, Bold and italic indicate returning appearance, all indicated unless otherwise noted.

- General of the Army Sergey Shoigu, Minister of Defense of the Russian Federation (parade reviewing inspector)
- General of the Army Oleg Salyukov, Commander-in-Chief of the Russian Ground Forces (parade commander)

=== Military Bands ===
- Massed Military Bands of the Armed Forces under the direction of the Senior Director of Music of the Military Bands Service of the Armed Forces of the Russian Federation, Major General Timofey Mayakin
- Corps of Drums of the Moscow Military Music College

=== Ground Column ===
- 154th Preobrazhensky Independent Commandant's Regiment Colour Guard
- Honour Guard Company of the 1st Honor Guard Battalion, 154th PICR
- Suvorov Military School
- Nakhimov Naval School
- **Kronstadt Sea Cadet Corps** (returning)
- Moscow National Guard Presidential Cadets School
- **Moscow Cadet Corps of the Investigative Committee of Russia** (first appearance)
- Moscow Young Army Patriotic Cadets Unit (on behalf of the Young Army Cadets National Movement)
- Moscow National Pensions School Cadet Corps
- Combined Arms Academy of the Armed Forces of the Russian Federation
- Military University of the Ministry of Defense of the Russian Federation
- Military Academy of the Armed Forces Air Defense Branch "Marshal Alexander Vasilevsky"
- Military Logistics Academy "General of the Army A. V. Khrulev"
- Zhukovsky – Gagarin Air Force Academy
- Military Space Academy "Alexander Mozhaysky"
- **Naval Academy "Admiral of the Fleet of the Soviet Union Nikolai Kuznetsov"**
  - Represented by the **Peter the Great Sea Cadet Corps - Saint Petersburg Naval Institute**
- Black Sea Higher Naval Military Institute "Admiral Pavel Nakhimov"
- 336th Independent Guards Biaystok Marine Brigade of the Baltic Fleet
- **61st Kirkinesskaya Red Banner Marine Brigade of the Northern Fleet**
- Peter the Great Military Academy of the Strategic Missile Forces
- Ryazan Guards Higher Airborne Command School "Gen. of the Army Vasily Margelov"'
- 98th Guards Airborne Division
- Moscow Military Police Battalion
- Engineering Forces, Nuclear, Biological and Chemical Defence and Control Military Academy "Marshal of the Soviet Union Semyon Timoshenko"
- 29th and 38th Independent Railway Brigades of the Russian Railway Troops
- Civil Defense Academy of the Ministry of Emergency Situations
- Separate Operational Purpose Division of the National Guard Forces Command, Federal National Guard Troops Service of the Russian Federation "Felix Dzerzhinsky"
- Saratov Military Institute of the National Guard Forces Command
- **Moscow Internal Affairs University** (first appearance)
- Moscow Border Guards Institute of the Federal Security Service of the Russian Federation
- 2nd Guards Tamanskaya Motor Rifle Division "Mikhail Kalinin"
- 4th Guards Kantemirovskaya Tank Division "Yuri Andropov"
- 27th Independent Guards Sevastopol Motor Rifle Brigade "60th Diamond Jubilee Anniversary of the formation of the USSR"
- Moscow Higher Military Command School "Supreme Soviet of Russia"

=== Mobile Column ===
- T-34/85 medium tank
- GAZ-233114 "Tigr-M" infantry mobility vehicle (45th Guards Independent Reconnaissance Brigade)
- GAZ-233114 "Tigr-M" with Arbalet-DM remote weapon station mounting a Kord heavy machine gun (45th Guards Independent Reconnaissance Brigade)
- Kornet D/EM mobile ATGM system on the GAZ-233116 "Tigr-M" chassis (45th Guards Independent Reconnaissance Brigade)
- BMP Kurganets-25 IFV (27th Independent Guards "Sevastopol" Motorized Rifle Brigade)
- BMP-3 infantry fighting vehicle (27th Independent Guards "Sevastopol" Motorized Rifle Brigade)
- T-14 main battle tank (2nd Guards "Tamanskaya" Motorized Rifle Division)
- BMPT Terminator armored support combat vehicle (2nd Guards "Tamanskaya" Motorized Rifle Division)
- T-72B3M (T-72B4) modernized main battle tank (2nd Guards "Tamanskaya" Motorized Rifle Division)
- BTR-MDM "Rakushka" APC (106th Guards Tula Airborne Division)
- BMD-4M air-droppable IFV (106th Guards Tula Airborne Division)
- 2S19 Msta-S tracked self-propelled howitzer (236th Self-Propelled Artillery Regiment)
- 9K720 Iskander-M mobile tactical ballistic missile system (112th Guards "Novorossiysk" MRL Brigade)
- BM-30 Smerch mobile MRL system (112th Guards "Novorossiysk" MRL Brigade)
- Tor-M2U SAM complex on tracked chassis (6th Independent Tank Brigade)
- Buk-M2 mobile tracked SAM system (6th Independent Tank Brigade)
- Pantsir-S1 mobile SAM system on wheeled chassis (93rd Guards Anti-Aircraft Rocket Regiment)
- S-400 Triumf SAM launch system on 5P85SM2-01 transporter-erector launcher (93rd Guards Anti-Aircraft Rocket Regiment)
- Patrul-A MRAP (National Guard of Russia Separate Operational Purpose Division, National Guard Forces Command)
- Ural-VV MRAP (National Guard of Russia Separate Operational Purpose Division, National Guard Forces Command)
- Kamaz 53949 Typhoon-K light MRAP (Russian Military Police)
- Ural Typhoon MRAP (Russian Military Police)
- RS-24 Yars ICBM on 15U175M wheeled transporter-erector launcher (54th Guards Rocket Division)
- VPK-7829 Bumerang wheeled APC

== Other parades ==
As per tradition, 27 other Russian major cities (Sevastopol and Kerch in the disputed Crimea included) were expected to hold commemorative parades on that day (some of them including flypasts), and joint civil-military parades are planned to be hosted by 50 other towns and cities nationwide. Celebrations of the holiday are held in almost all the former republics of the Soviet Union.

One of the biggest parades outside the capital was to be held on Saint Petersburg's Palace Square, in a sort of final celebration of the diamond jubilee since the conclusion of the long Siege of Leningrad, which was marked with a parade there on 31 January. During that parade units of the mobile column sported Soviet unit banners perpetuating the Second World War lineage and service of these units.

In addition, the Serbian Armed Forces held a parade in Belgrade on 10 May, honoring both the living Serbian veterans of the Yugoslav Partisans and the Royal Yugoslav Army in the Second World War and the veterans of the 1999 NATO bombing of Yugoslavia.

== See also ==
- Moscow Victory Parade of 1945
- Victory Day (9 May)
- Victory in Europe Day
- Victory Day Parades
