= Svobodny Airport =

Svobodny
- IATA: none; ICAO: UHBS (УХБС)

Summary
- Airport type: Public
- Location: Svobodnyy
- Elevation AMSL: 600 ft / 183 m
- Coordinates: 51°27′18″N 128°5′54″E
- Interactive map of Svobodny

Runways
| Direction | Length | | Surface |
| Direction | ft | m | Surface |
|---|---|---|---|
| | 3,773 | 1,150 | Concrete |

Svobodny (ICAO: UHBS) is an airport in Amur Oblast, Russia located 11 km north of Svobodny. It is a small general aviation airport. The field elevation is 600 feet.

| Airlines | Destinations |
|---|---|
| Amur Aviabase | Blagoveshchensk, Oktyabrsky |

== See also ==
- List of airports in Russia
