= 1996 Abakan Ilyushin Il-76 crash =

1996 aircraft crash in Russia

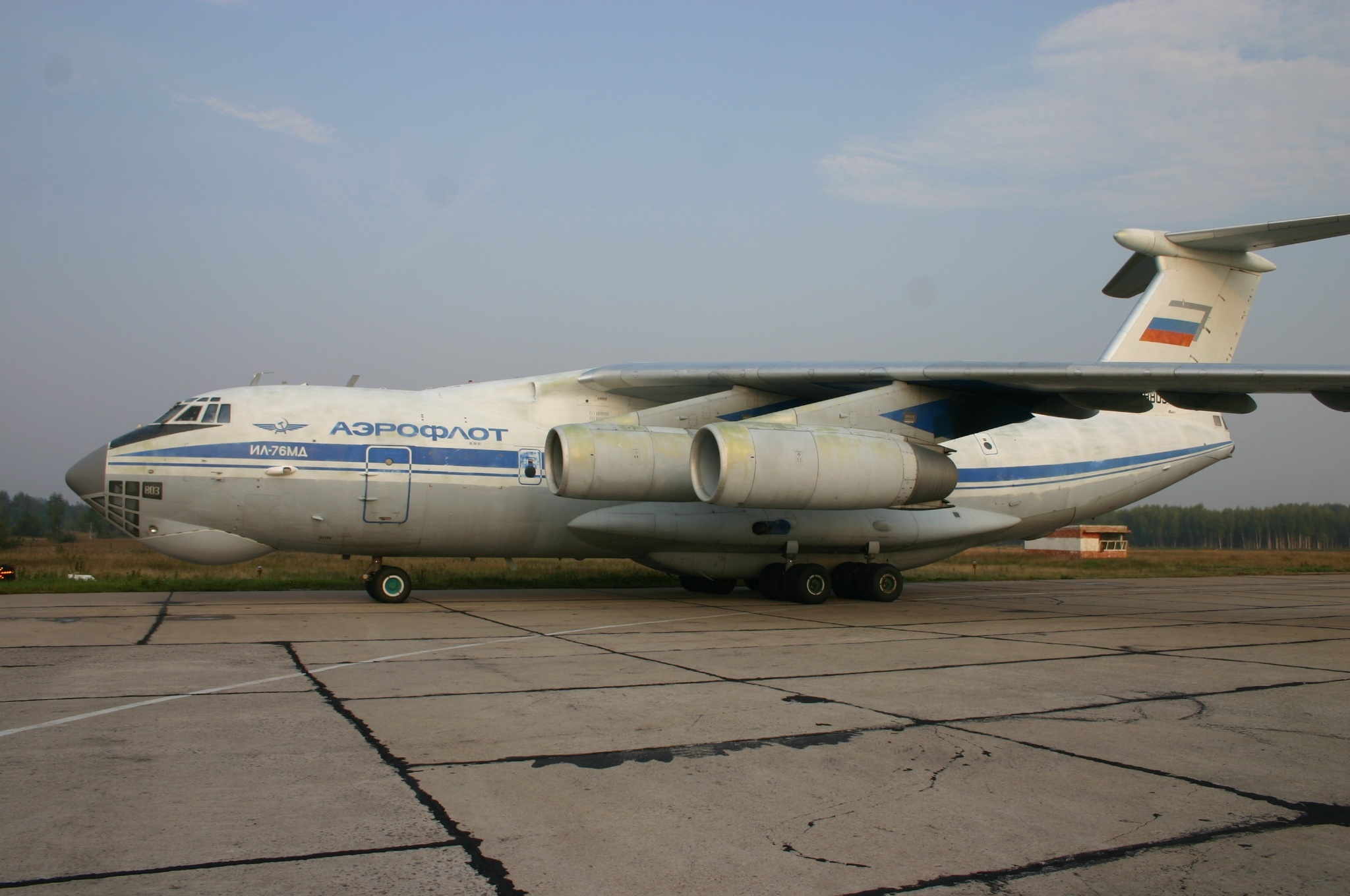
- A Russian Air Force Ilyushin IL-76, similar to the aircraft involved

Accident
- Date: 27 November 1996
- Summary: Controlled flight into terrain due to pilot error
- Site: 14 km (8.7 mi) NNE of Abakan Airport; 53°51′31″N 91°36′02″E

Aircraft
- Aircraft type: Ilyushin Il-76MD
- Operator: Russian Air Force
- Registration: RA-78804
- Flight origin: Moscow Ramenskoye Airport, Moscow Oblast, Russia
- Stopover: Abakan International Airport, Abakan, Russia
- Destination: Petropavlovsk-Kamchatsky Airport, Petropavlovsk-Kamchatsky, Russia
- Occupants: 23
- Passengers: 13
- Crew: 10
- Fatalities: 23
- Survivors: 0

On 27 November 1996, a Russian Air Force Ilyushin Il-76 crashed near Abakan Airport, Russia, killing all 23 people on board. The plane was on a cargo flight from Moscow Ramenskoye Airport (Note: Ramenskoye was renamed to Zhukovsky International Airport in 2016.) to Petropavlovsk-Kamchatsky Airport, with a scheduled stopover at Abakan International Airport.

== Crew ==
The following crew members in the flight were:

- Captain: Andrei Vitalievich Berezhnoy.
- First Officer: Kirill Vladimirovich Lyapushkin.
- Flight Engineer: Andrei Georgievich Uskov
- Navigator: Dimitry Alexandrovich Kachura.
- Flight Operator: Vadim Vasilievich Belikov.
- Flight Instructor: Andrei Olegovich Yakovlev.

The following crew members were not in the cockpit:

- Reserve Captain: Victor Nickolaevich Sivokoz.
- Reserve First Officer: Alexander Nikolaevich Rybak.
- Reserve Flight Operator: Alexander Vitalievich Smirnov.
- (Tail Turret Operator) Air Gunner: Vladimir Alexandrovich Hrapak.
