= Roman Trotsenko =

Russian billionaire businessman (born 1970)

- Роман Троценко
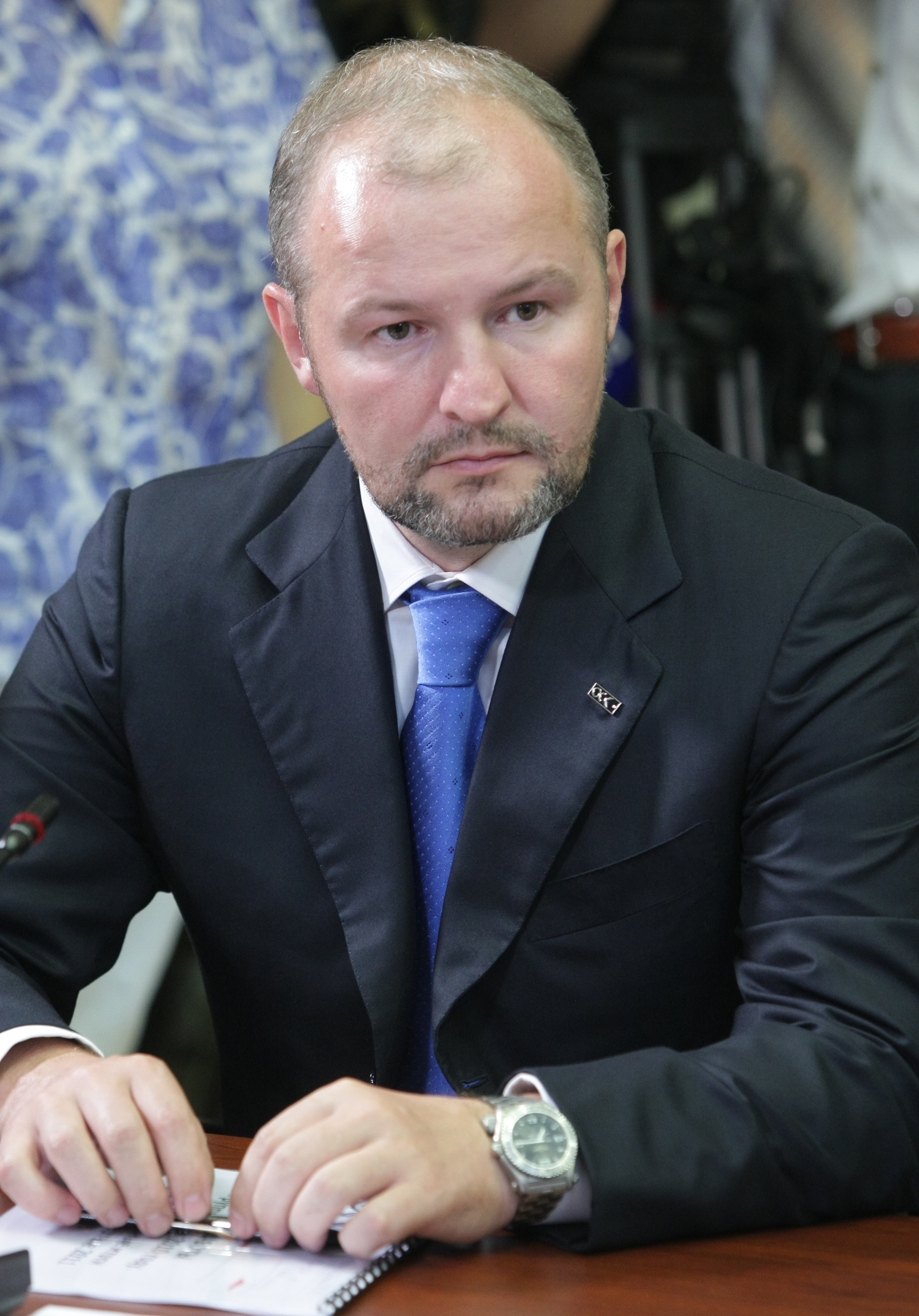
- Trotsenko in 2011
- Born: 12 September 1970 (age 55)
- Education: Moscow State University
- Occupation: Businessman

Roman Viktorovich Trotsenko (Russian: Роман Викторович Троценко; born 12 September 1970) is a Russian billionaire businessman. He is the owner of Aeon Corporation, a Russian investment and management company. According to Forbes, he has an estimated net worth of US$1.6 billion.

== Early life ==
Trotsenko was born into a family of doctors. In 1986, he entered the faculty of socio-economics of the Institute of Asian and African Countries at Moscow State University. He specialized in Japanese economy, and studied Japanese and English.

== Career ==
Trotsenko began his executive career in 1991, when he was selected to be director of finance for the International Medical Exchange. By age 22, he had earned his first million rubles.

He became the president of OSJC United Shipbuilding Corporation in 2009. He served as president until 1 July 2012.

Trotsenko's name was included in the Panama Papers which were leaked in 2016.

In August 2021, Roman Trotensko's company Carbon together with Stabeck Mishakov, ex-Basovy Element top-manager, founded Arctic Energy Group LLC with respective shares of 70 and %. Carbon company is focused on commercial and administrative consulting. Alexandra Mutovina is named Carbon's CEO. In December 2021, "Russkaya energia" LLC, where Mr. Trotsenko holds a 70% stake, agreed to buy "Vorkutaugol" of Severstal for 15 billions of roubles.

== Personal life ==
Trotsenko lives with his wife and two children in Moscow. In 2021, Trotsenko had purchased a luxurious villa in the Maremma coast, Tuscany.

== Awards ==
- 11 February 2023 — Order of Friendship (Russia) for achievements in labor and many years of conscientious work;
- 2 September 2009 — Medal of the Order "For Merit to the Fatherland", II degree (2 сентября 2009 года) for active participation in the preparation and delivery of historical relics of the Varyag cruiser to Russia;
- 4 May 2012 — Gratitude of the President of the Russian Federation for active participation in the work on the preparation of proposals for the formation of the Open Government system in the Russian Federation;
- 25 May 2021 — Officer of the Order of the Star of Italy (Italy).
