= Kyzyl Airport =

Airport in Tuva, Russia

Kyzyl International Airport Кызылдың Делегей Чергелиг Аэропорту
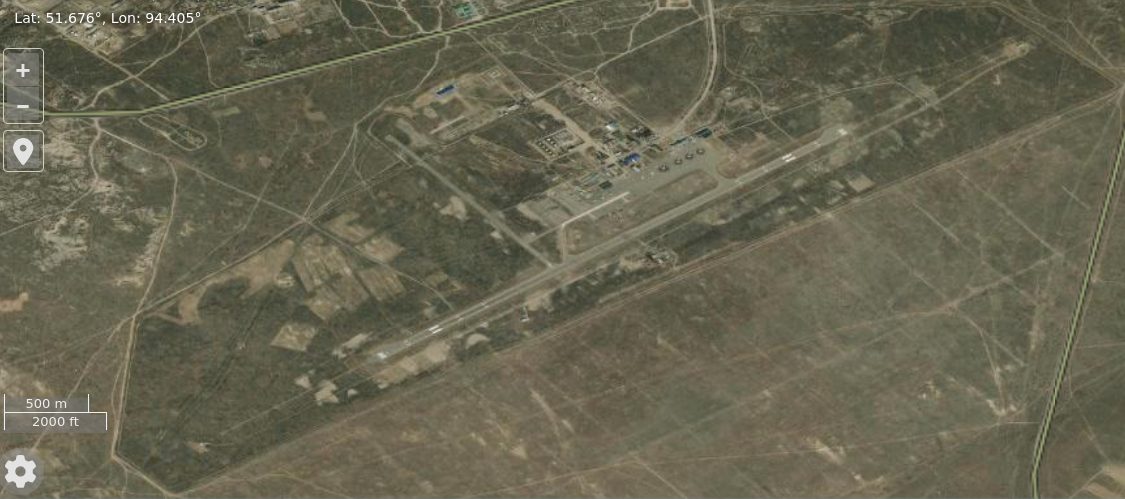
- Satellite imagery of Kyzyl Airport

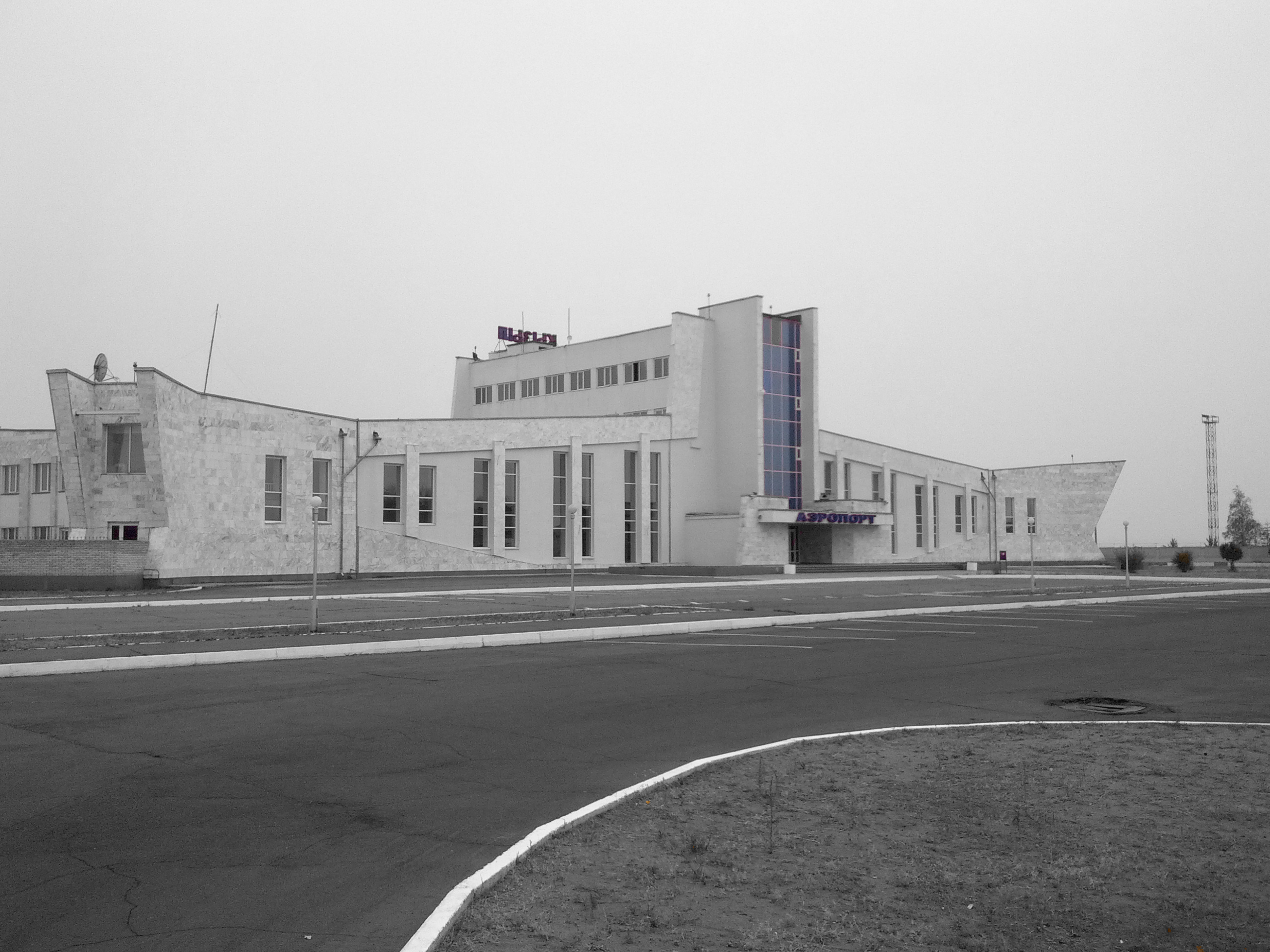
- IATA: KYZ; ICAO: UNKY

Summary
- Airport type: Public
- Operator: FSUE "Tuva Airlines"
- Serves: Kyzyl
- Location: Kyzyl, Russia
- Hub for: Ayana
- Coordinates: 51°40′33.86″N 94°24′18.54″E
- Website: tuvaairport.ru

Map
- Location of airport in Tuva Republic

Runways
Direction	Length		Surface
Direction	ft	m	Surface
05/23	8,858	2,700	Concrete
14/32	4,265	1,300	Concrete

Kyzyl Airport (Tuvan: Кызылдың Делегей Чергелиг Аэропорту, romanized: Kızıldıñ Delegey çergelig Aeroportu, Russian: Аэропорт Кызыл) (IATA: KYZ, ICAO: UNKY) is a Russian international airport that serves Kyzyl, in Tuva, Russia. The airport is located 6 km southwest of the city center.

The base is the home of the 32nd Independent Composite Transport Aviation Regiment, Composite Aviation Squadron which is part of the 14th Air and Air Defence Forces Army.

== History ==
The Russian government planned to renovate the airport, either by itself or in partnership with another agency. A runway extension was planned, in which the airport may accept larger aircraft flying to and from Moscow and Saint Petersburg; or for technical stops for flights from China, Mongolia, Kazakhstan and other Asian countries operating to the western part of Russia or elsewhere in Europe. The runway reconstruction officially ended on 13 February 2018, with an ATR 42-500 of NordStar arriving from Krasnoyarsk-Yemelyanovo.

On 5 September 2019, Kyzyl Airport received permission to operate international flights.

== Airlines and destinations ==
Airlines	Destinations
IrAero	Moscow–Domodedovo
KrasAvia	Krasnoyarsk–Yemelyanovo, Ulan-Ude; Seasonal: Ulaanbaatar
S7 Airlines	Moscow-Domodedovo, Novosibirsk

== Statistics ==
=== Annual Traffic ===
Annual Passenger Traffic

Year	Passengers	% Change
2014	24,099	
2015	▲	+17,9
2016	33,651 ▲	+12,7
2017	24,786 ▼	-35,8

== See also ==
- List of airports in Russia
- List of military airbases in Russia
