= Chita-Kadala International Airport =

Airport in Chita, Russia

Chita International Airport

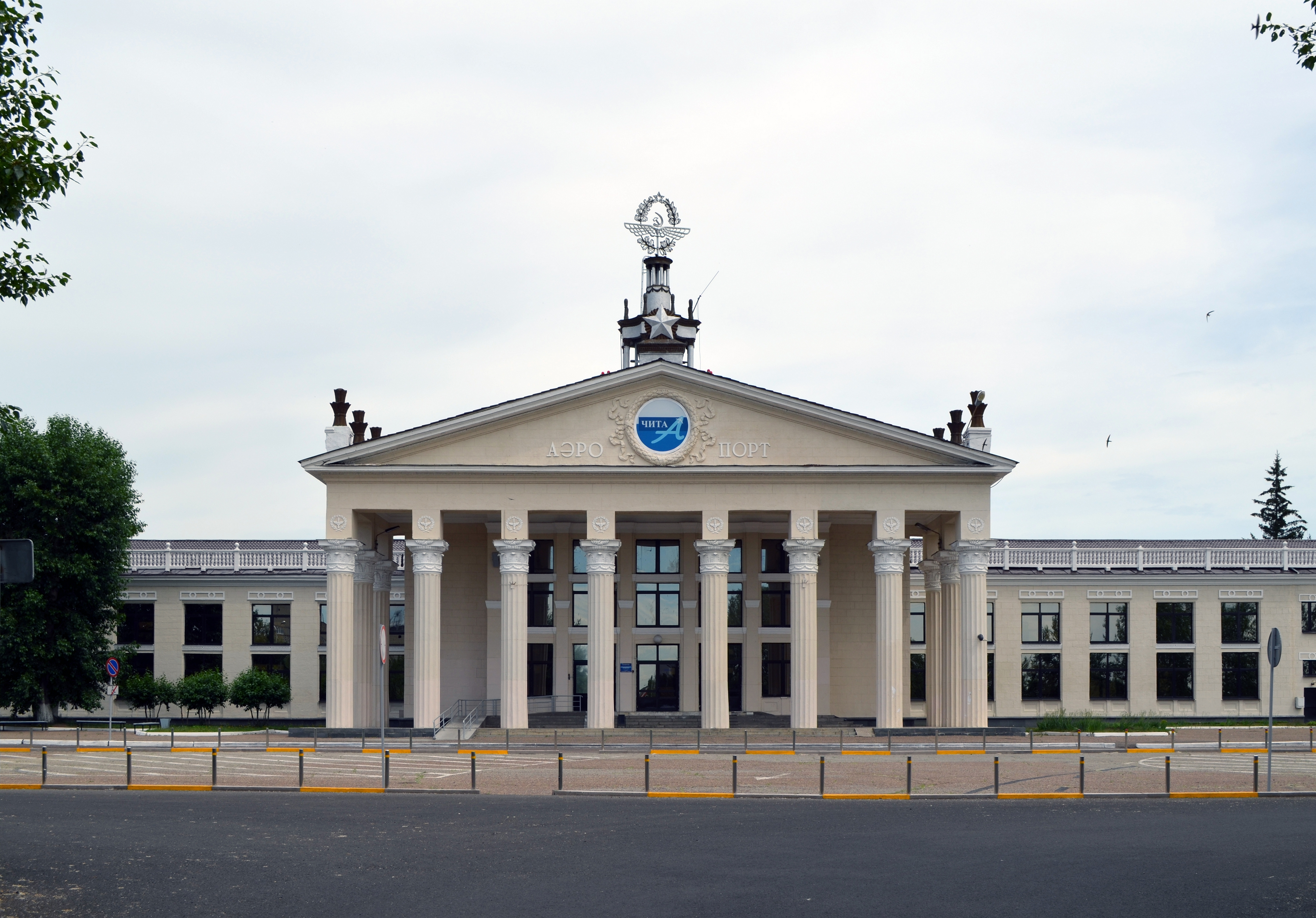
- IATA: HTA; ICAO: UIAA

Summary
- Airport type: Public
- Owner: Roman Trotsenko through Novaport, AEON Corporation
- Operator: Aeroport Chita (JSC)
- Serves: Chita
- Location: Chita, Russia
- Elevation AMSL: 692 m (2,270 ft)
- Coordinates: 52°1′36″N 113°18′18″E
- Website: http://www.aerochita.ru/

Map
- Location of airport in Zabaykalsky Krai

Runways
Direction	Length		Surface
Direction	ft	m	Surface
11/29	9,187	2,800	Concrete

Statistics (2019)
- Passengers: 455,350
- Metric tonnes of cargo: 2,610

Chita-Kadala International Airport (IATA: HTA, ICAO: UIAA) is a single runway airport, located in Chita (Russian: Чита, IPA: [tɕɪˈta]), the administrative center of Zabaykalsky Krai, Russia. The airport handles about 150,000 passengers per year.

== Airlines and destinations ==
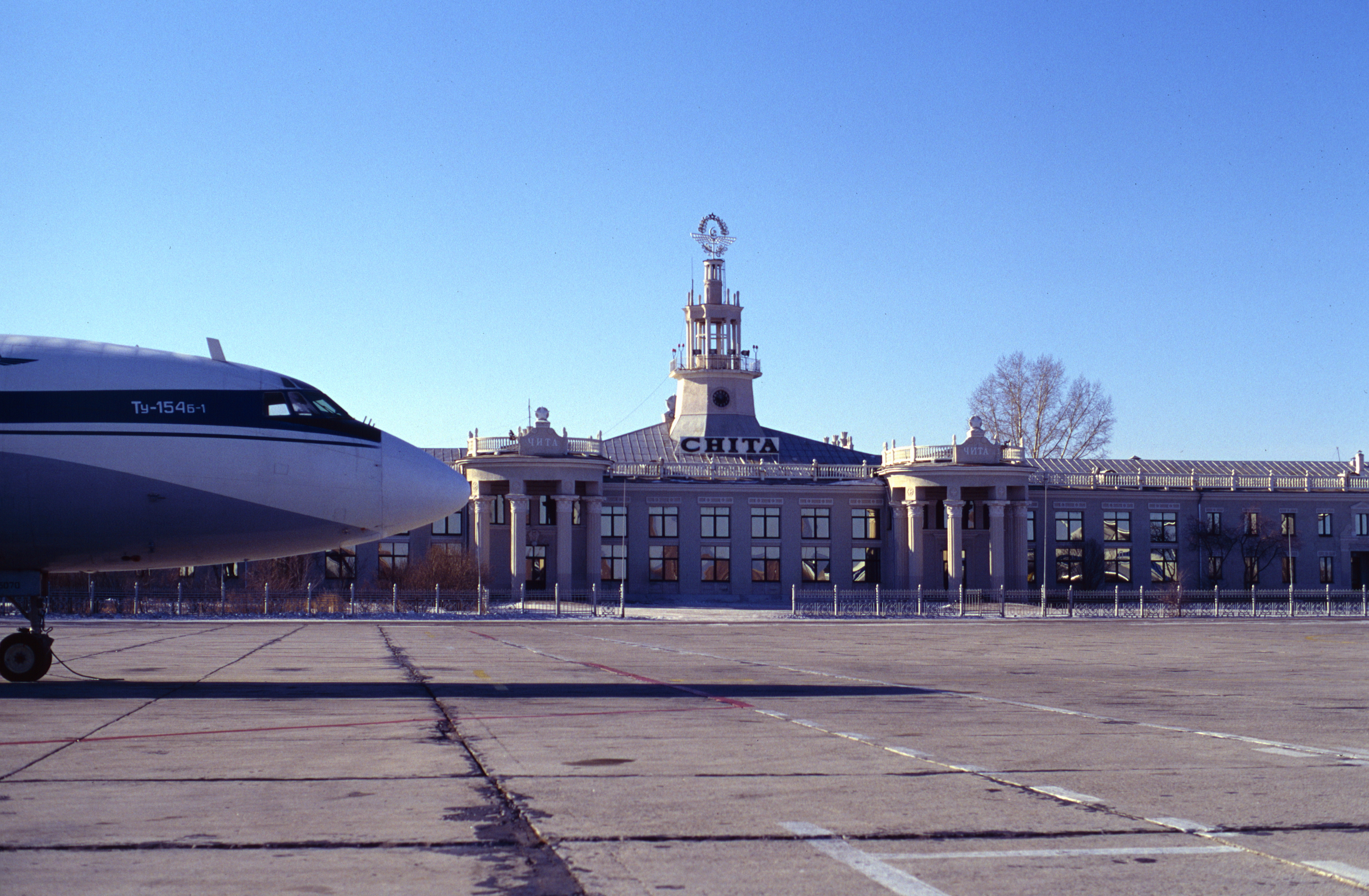
Aeroflot plane Tu-154 near old terminal

Airlines	Destinations
Aeroservis	Gazimursky Zavod, Krasnokamensk, Krasny Chikoy, Kyra, Menza, Usugli, Yumurchen
Air China	Beijing–Capital, Hailar
Aurora	Khabarovsk, Vladivostok
Azur Air	Seasonal charter: Phuket
IrAero	Chara, Irkutsk, Sanya (begins 10 December 2026), Yuzhno-Sakhalinsk; Seasonal: Abakan, Gorno-Altaysk; Seasonal charter: Nha Trang
Red Wings Airlines	Barnaul, Kemerovo, Novokuznetsk, Yekaterinburg
Rossiya	Krasnoyarsk-International
S7 Airlines	Irkutsk, Moscow–Domodedovo, Novosibirsk
Ural Airlines	Moscow–Domodedovo, Yekaterinburg
Yakutia Airlines	Khabarovsk, Vladivostok, Yakutsk

== Statistics ==
=== Annual Traffic ===
Annual Passenger Traffic

Year	Passengers
2010	173,000 ▲
2011	201,000 ▲
2012	241,000 ▲
2013	313,356 ▲
2014	329,499 ▲
2015	311,654 ▼
2016	327,564 ▲
2017	365,100 ▲

=== Busiest routes ===
Busiest routes at Chita-Kadala International Airport (by number of passengers) 2016
Rank	City	Region	Country	Airports	Airlines	Number of passengers
1	Moscow	Moscow / Moscow Oblast	Russia	Moscow Domodedovo Airport	Globus Airlines, S7 Airlines, Ural Airlines	171,427
2	Novosibirsk	Novosibirsk Oblast	Russia	Novosibirsk Tolmachevo Airport	S7 Airlines	47,970
3	St Petersburg / Yekaterinburg	Saint Petersburg/Leningrad Oblast / Sverdlovsk Oblast	Russia	Pulkovo Airport / Koltsovo Airport	Ural Airlines	30,731
4	Irkutsk	Irkutsk Oblast	Russia	International Airport Irkutsk	Angara Airlines, IrAero	16,729
5	Chara	Zabaykalsky Krai	Russia	Chara Airport	Angara Airlines	7,848

== See also ==
- List of airports in Russia
