= Ignatyevo =

Ignatyevo Игнатьево
- Selo
- Location within Amur Oblast Location within Russia
- Coordinates: 50°26′N 127°23′E
- Country: Russia
- Region: Amur Oblast
- District: Blagoveshchensky District
- Time zone: UTC+9:00

Ignatyevo (Russian: Игнатьево) is a rural locality (a selo) in Chigirinsky Selsoviet of Blagoveshchensky District, Amur Oblast, Russia. The population was 1,011 as of 2018. There are 27 streets.

== Geography ==
Ignatyevo is located 27 km north of Blagoveshchensk (the district's administrative centre) by road. Kanton-Kommuna is the nearest rural locality.
