= Moscow University of the Ministry of Internal Affairs of Russia =

Police university

Moscow University of the MVD
- Московский университет МВД России имени В. Я. Кикотя
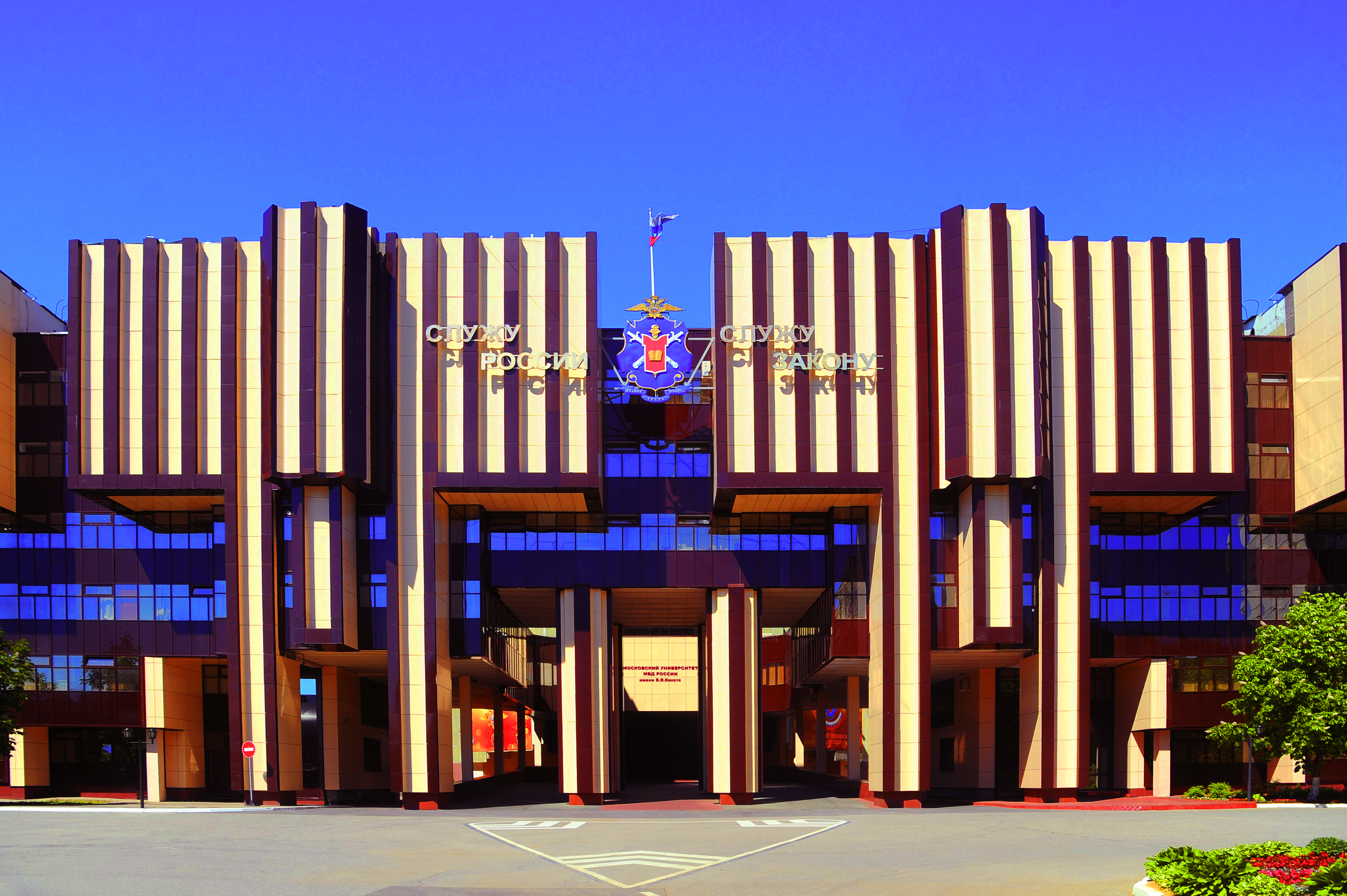
- Type: University
- Established: 2002
- Location: Moscow, 12 Akademika Volgina, Moscow, Russia; 55°46′18″N 37°37′51″E
- Campus: Urban
- Website: мосу.мвд.рф

The Vladimir Kikot Moscow University of the Ministry of Internal Affairs of Russia (Russian: Московский университет Министерства внутренних дел Российской Федерации имени В. Я. Кикотя) is a higher institution under the jurisdiction of the Ministry of Internal Affairs of the Russian Federation located in Moscow.

== History ==
On July 9, 1929, by a decision of the Council of People's Commissars of the RSFSR in Moscow, Higher Improvement Courses for the senior commanders of the administrative-police apparatus were organized, the first graduation of which took place at the end of 1930. That year, the courses were transformed into the Central Higher School of Workers 'and Peasants' Police with a two-year term of study. In 1931 the buildings of the former Ivanovo Monastery were transferred to the school. In 1934 courses received all-Union status with the formation of the NKVD of the USSR, a police department and a faculty for training personnel in correctional institutions were formed in its composition. During World War II, the school staff was in a barracks position and served as a policeman, although classes continued. In connection with the expansion of the training profile in 1943, the courses were transformed into the Higher School of the NKVD of the USSR.

In 1949 in connection with the reform of the internal affairs bodies and their transfer to the USSR Ministry of State Security, the school was divided into two educational institutions - the Higher Officer School of the USSR Ministry of Internal Affairs for the training of correctional labor institutions and the Higher Police School of the Ministry of State Security of the USSR.

In 1974. on the basis of the correspondence department of the Higher School of the Ministry of Internal Affairs of the USSR, the Moscow branch of legal correspondence education (IFLO) at the Academy of the Ministry of Internal Affairs of the USSR was formed. It had in its structure branches, training and consulting centers (UKP), branches located in the republics of the Soviet Union, regions of the RSFSR, including, for example, Leningrad, Sverdlovsk, Rostov, Minsk faculty, Kazan UKP (subsequent branch), Perm, Saratov branch of the MFLHE under the Academy of the Ministry of Internal Affairs of the USSR. In 1988, the Moscow branch of legal correspondence education (IFLHE) was allocated to an independent university: the Higher Legal Extramural School of the Ministry of Internal Affairs. The structure of the Higher School of Law, in addition to the head center in Moscow, also included the Leningrad, Sverdlovsk, Rostov, Stavropol faculty, Kazan branch, Perm (subsequently faculty), Saratov branch of the Higher School of Law of the USSR Ministry of Internal Affairs.

In 1993, on the basis of the Higher Correspondence School of Law of the Ministry of Internal Affairs of the Russian Federation on the basis of Decree of the Council of Ministers of the Russian Federation of July 20, 1993 No. 687, the Legal Institute of the Ministry of Internal Affairs of Russia was established.

In July 1995, the Moscow Higher Police School was transformed into the Moscow Law Institute of the Ministry of Internal Affairs of Russia. In June 2002, the three universities of the MVD: the Moscow Academy of the Ministry of Internal Affairs of the Russian Federation, the Moscow Institute of the Ministry of Internal Affairs of the Russian Federation, and the Law Institute of the Ministry of Internal Affairs of the Russian Federation, merged into the Moscow University of the Ministry of Internal Affairs of Russia. In September 2011, the Academy of Economic Security of the Ministry of Internal Affairs of Russia is annexed to the university as a faculty of economic security.

== Organization ==
=== Institutes and faculties ===
- Institute for the training of employees for preliminary investigation bodies
- Institute of Psychology
- Forensic Institute
- International Law Faculty
- Faculty for Operational Police Units
- Department of Public Order Police Training
- Faculty of Information Security Training
- Faculty of Advanced Training
- Faculty of Distance Learning
- Faculty for the Preparation of Scientific and Pedagogical
- Faculty of Foreign Training
- Faculty of Economic Security and Anti-corruption Units

=== Branches ===
- Moscow Regional Branch
- Ryazan Branch
- Tver Branch

== Activities ==
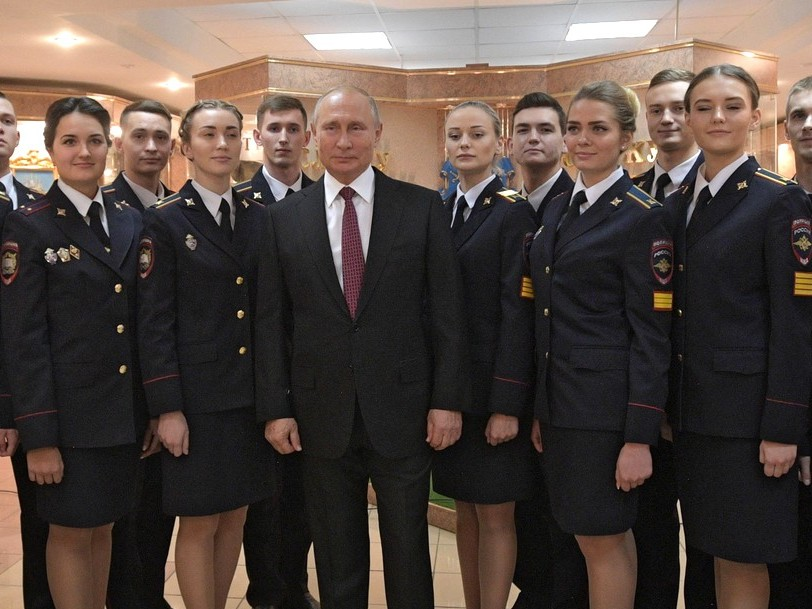
President Vladimir Putin with cadets of the university on Police and Internal Affairs Servicemen's Day.

The Cultural Center of the Moscow University of the Ministry of Internal Affairs is responsible for patriotic education in cadets. It organizes annual tournaments among the institutes, faculties and branches. It maintains a vocalist ensemble, a brass band and a drum ensemble. The university regularly holds events in the framework of the patriotic campaigns Memory Watch, the Relay of achievement and the Week of courage. The university publishes a magazine called Bulletin of Economic Security and the newspaper Serving the Law.

== Honours and traditions ==
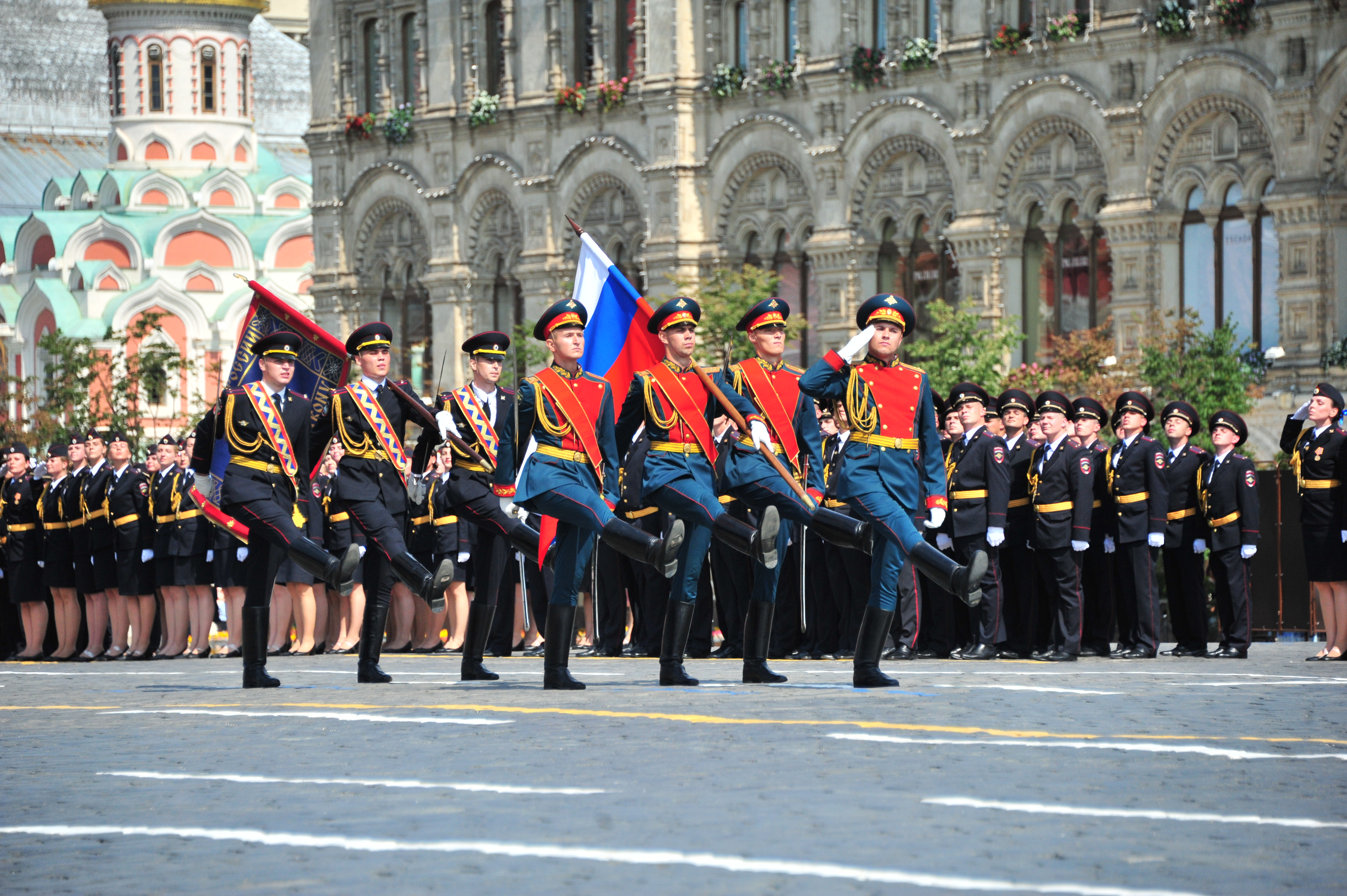
A ceremonial graduation on Red Square.

In September 1975, by decree of the Council of Ministers of the USSR, the Higher Police School was presented with the Red Banner. On 12 August 2014, by Decree of the President of Russia, the honorary title of "Federal State Treasury Educational Institution of Higher Professional Education" was attached to the university and was named after Vladimir Kikotya. On 9 May 2019, for the first time in the history of the Moscow Victory Day Parade, a ceremonial unit of the university took part in the procession on Red Square.
