= IrAero =

Russian airline

IrAero ИрАэро

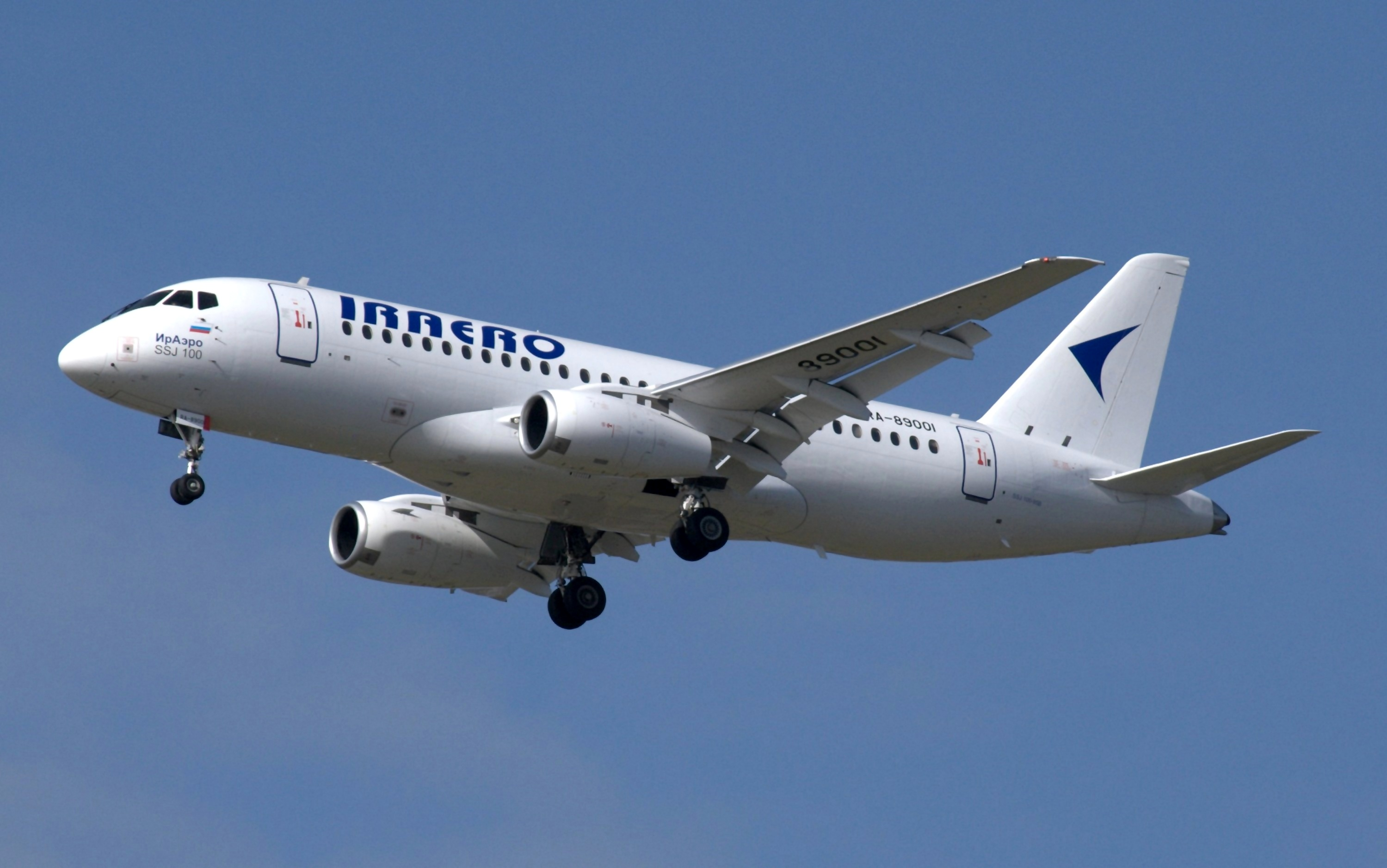
- IrAero Sukhoi Superjet 100-95
IATA	ICAO	Call sign
IO	IAE	IRAERO
- Founded: 1999; 27 years ago
- Hubs: Irkutsk
- Secondary hubs: Magadan; Moscow-Domodedovo; Yakutsk
- Fleet size: 32
- Destinations: 60
- Headquarters: Irkutsk, Russia
- Website: iraero.ru

IrAero is an airline based in Irkutsk, Russia. It operates domestic and international scheduled passenger services, charter and cargo flights. Its main base is in Irkutsk Airport.

== History ==
The airline was established in 1999 in Irkutsk, Russia.

== Destinations ==
IrAero flies to a number of destinations from its hubs in Russia: Irkutsk, Yakutsk, Magadan, and Moscow. It also carries out international flights to a number of countries including Turkey, Azerbaijan, China, Mongolia, Philippines, and Vietnam.

Country	City	Airport	Notes	Refs
Azerbaijan	Baku	Heydar Aliyev International Airport		
China	Beijing	Beijing Daxing International Airport		
China	Dalian	Dalian Zhoushuizi International Airport	Seasonal charter	
China	Harbin	Harbin Taiping International Airport		
China	Manzhouli	Manzhouli Xijiao Airport		
China	Sanya	Sanya Phoenix International Airport	Resumes 10 December 2026	
Mongolia	Ulaanbaatar	Chinggis Khaan International Airport		
Philippines	Kalibo	Kalibo International Airport	Resumes 20 October 2026	
Russia	Abakan	Abakan Airport	Seasonal	
Russia	Blagoveshchensk	Ignatyevo Airport		
Russia	Chelyabinsk	Kurchatov Chelyabinsk International Airport	Seasonal	
Russia	Chita	Kadala Airport		
Russia	Irkutsk	International Airport Irkutsk	Hub	
Russia	Neryungri	Chulman Neryungri Airport		
Russia	Sochi	Adler-Sochi International Airport	Seasonal	
Russia	Vladivostok	Vladivostok International Airport		
Turkey	Alanya / Gazipaşa	Gazipaşa–Alanya Airport	Seasonal	
Turkey	Antalya	Antalya Airport		
Turkey	Istanbul	Istanbul Airport		
Vietnam	Hanoi	Noi Bai International Airport		
Vietnam	Nha Trang	Cam Ranh International Airport		
Vietnam	Phu Quoc	Phu Quoc International Airport		

== Fleet ==
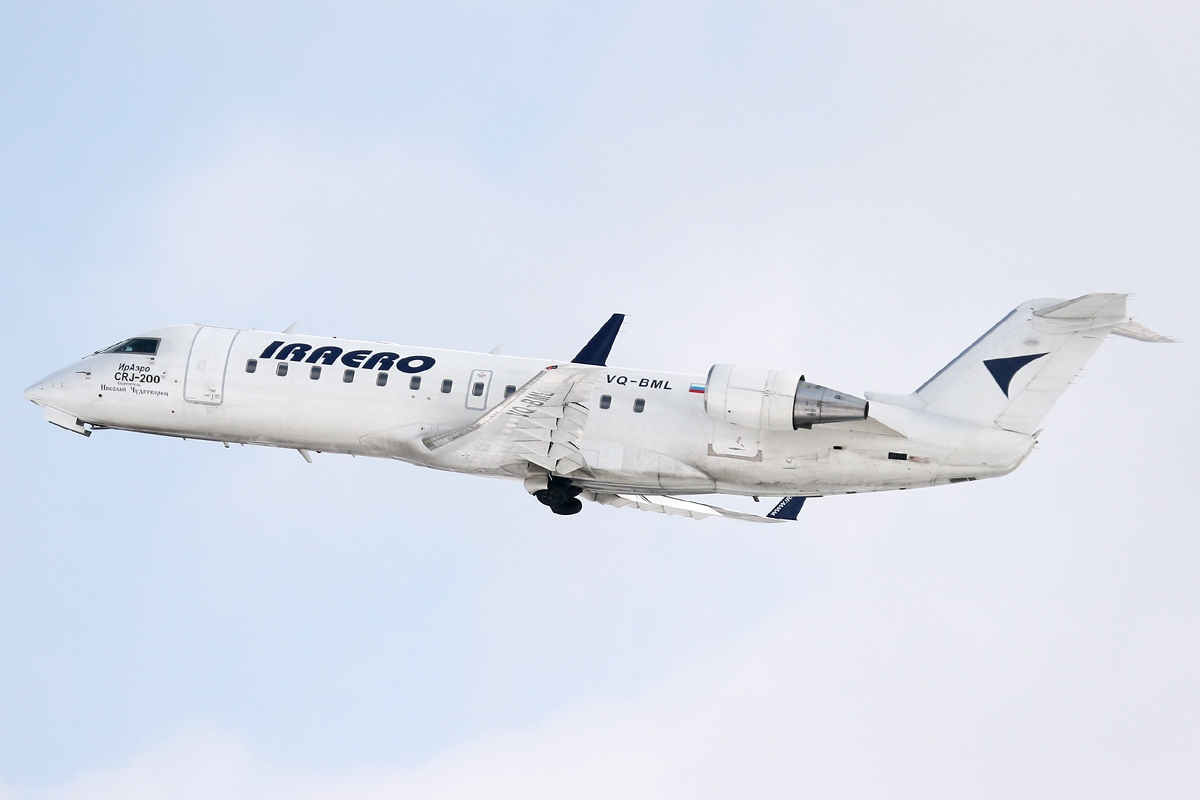
IrAero Bombardier CRJ200LR

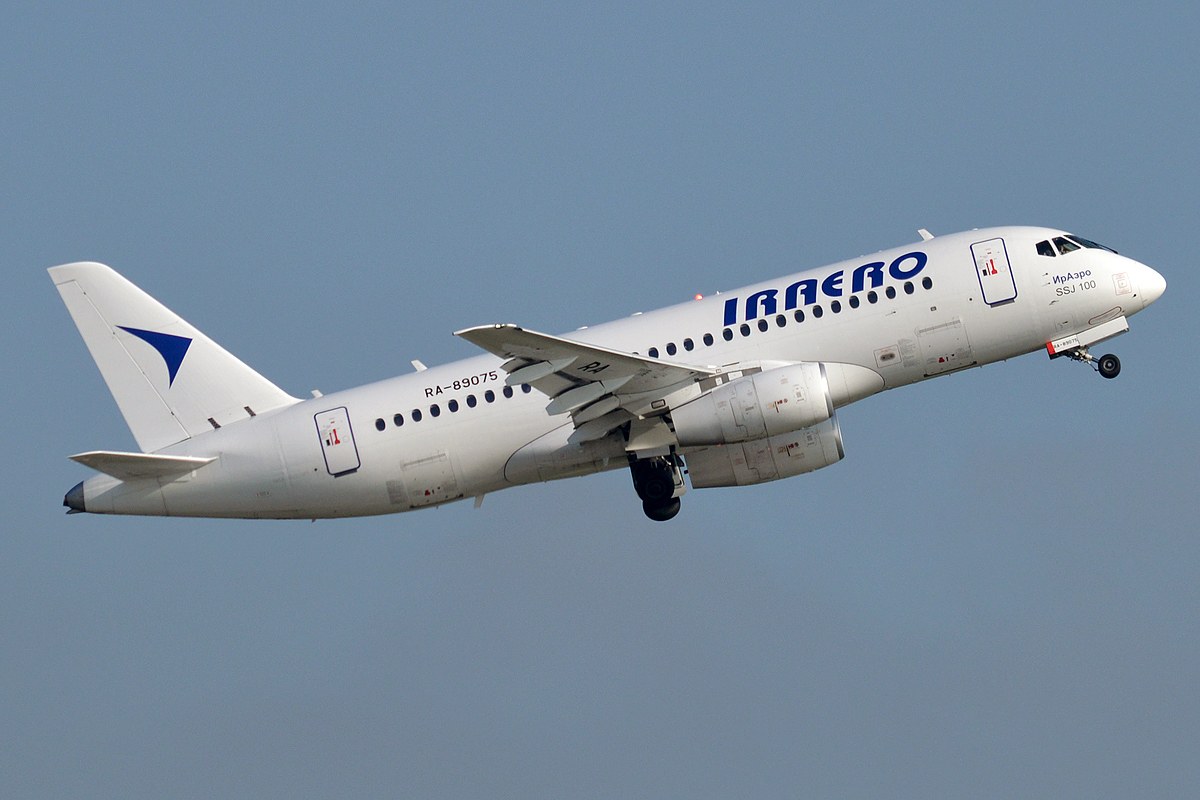
IrAero Sukhoi Superjet 100

=== Current fleet ===
As of August 2025, IrAero operates the following aircraft:

IrAero fleet
Aircraft	In service	Orders	Passengers			Notes
Aircraft	In service	Orders	C	Y	Total	Notes
Airbus A319-100	1	—	—	156	156	
Antonov An-24RV	14	—	—	50	50	
Antonov An-26-100	13	—	—	40	40	
Bombardier CRJ200LR	1	—	—	50	50	
Sukhoi Superjet 100-95LR	7	—	12	81	93	
Yakovlev MC-21-300	—	10	TBA			Launch customer, delayed delivery originally scheduled for 2019.
Total	9	10				

=== Former fleet ===
The IrAero fleet previously also included the following aircraft types:

- Antonov An-140
- Boeing 737-800
- Boeing 777-200ER

== Accidents ==
On 8 August 2011 IrAero Flight 103, operated by an Antonov An-24 (RA-46561), overran the runway at Ignatyevo Airport near Blagoveshchensk during landing at the end of a flight from Chita. Nine passengers and three crew of the five crew and 31 passengers on board were injured, but there were no casualties.
