= Ayano-Maysky District =

Ayano-Maysky District Аяно-Майский район (Russian)
- District
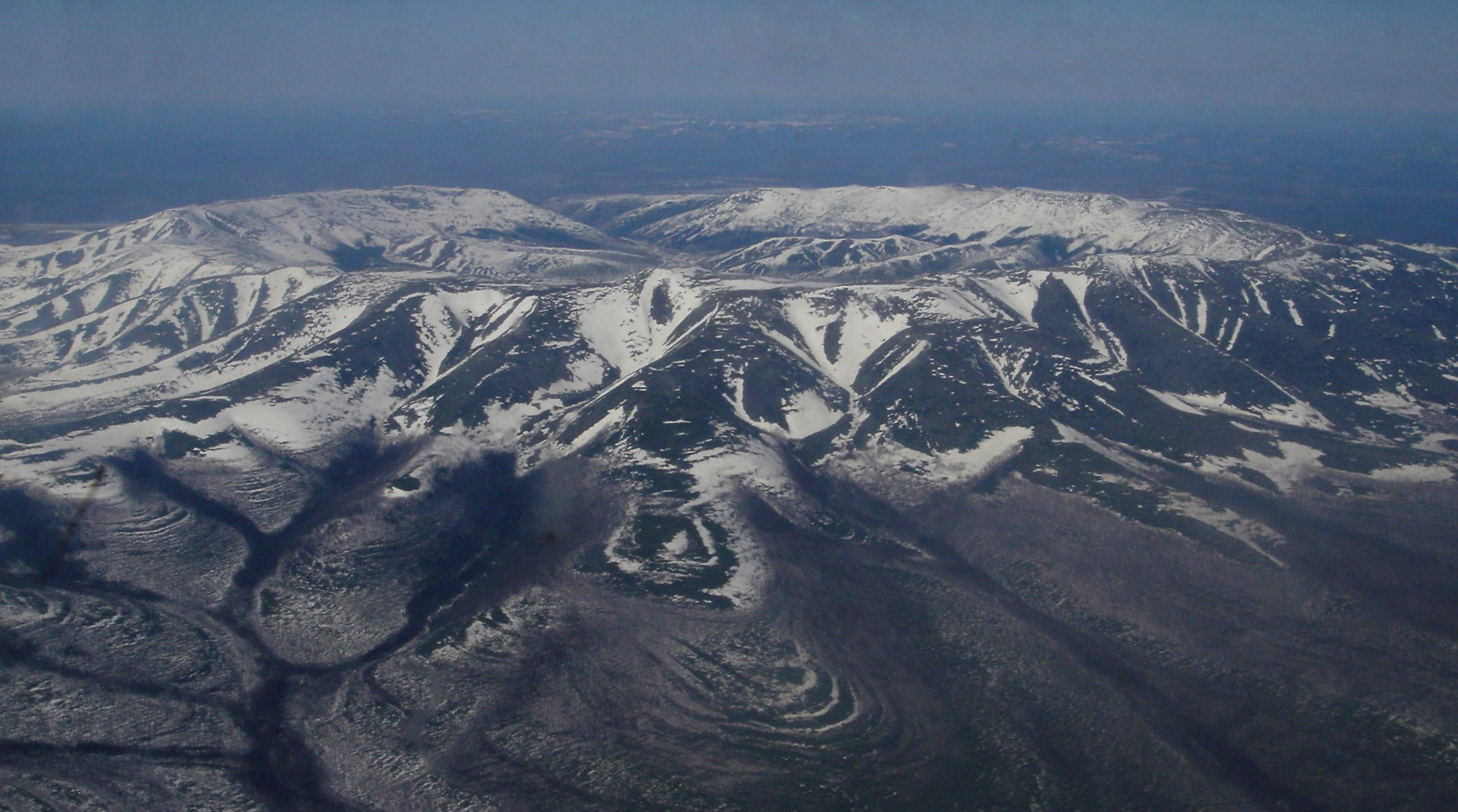
- Kondyor Massif an 8km wide circular intrusion, Ayano-Maysky District

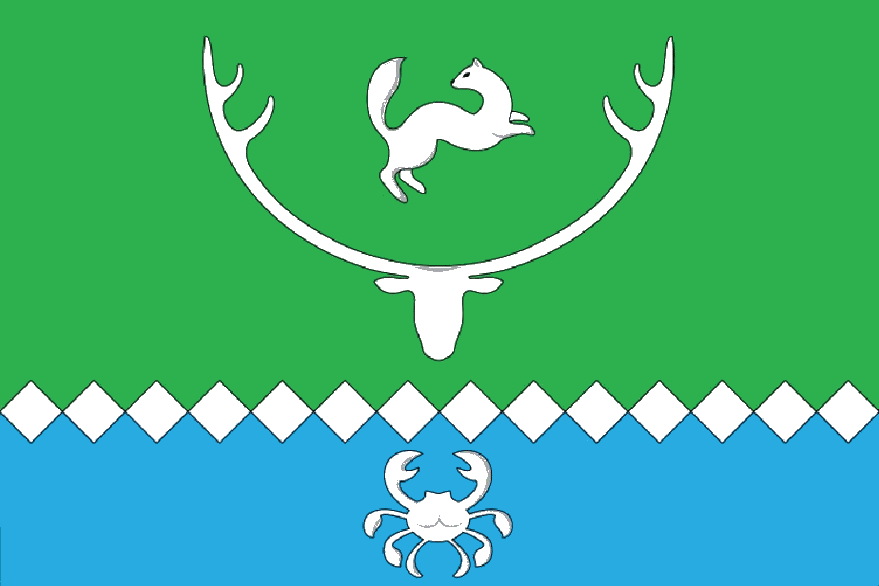
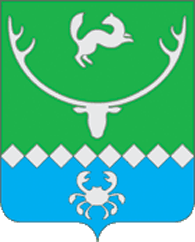
- Flag Coat of arms
- Location of Ayano-Maysky District in Khabarovsk Krai
- Coordinates: 57°30′N 136°00′E
- Country: Russia
- Federal subject: Khabarovsk Krai
- Established: 10 December 1930
- Administrative center: Ayan

Area
  - Total: 167,200 km^{2} (64,600 sq mi)

Population (2010 Census)
  - Total: 2,292
  - Density: 0.01371/km^{2} (0.03550/sq mi)
  - Urban: 0%
  - Rural: 100%

Administrative structure
  - Inhabited localities: 11 rural localities

Municipal structure
  - Municipally incorporated as: Ayano-Maysky Municipal District
  - Municipal divisions: 0 urban settlements, 4 rural settlements
- Time zone: UTC+10 (MSK+7)
- OKTMO ID: 08606000
- Website: http://www.ayanrayon.ru/

Ayano-Maysky District (Russian: Ая́но-Ма́йский райо́н) is an administrative and municipal district (raion), one of the seventeen in Khabarovsk Krai, Russia. It is located in the north of the krai. The area of the district is 167,200 square kilometers (64,600 sq mi). Its administrative center is the rural locality (a selo) of Ayan. Population: 2,292 (2010 census); 3,271 (2002 census); 4,802 (1989 Soviet census). The population of Ayan accounts for 42.2% of the district's total population.

== Geography ==
The district has two climatic zones: a sharply continental and a maritime continental. The villages of Aim, Dzhigda, and Nelkan are located in the former, and Ayan belongs to the latter. Areas along the coast receive much precipitation and have a frequent share of cloudy days, storm winds, and blizzards. Average winter temperatures range from −16 °C (3 °F) to −20 °C (−4 °F); average summer temperatures—from +18 °C (64 °F) to +20 °C (68 °F).

The impact of the Sea of Okhotsk on the coastal region is constant and as it moves west inland toward the Dzhugdzhur mountain range and becomes weaker the impact creates a climatic subzone, transforming the maritime climate into a sharply continental one. The ridge of the Dzhugdzhur Mountains demarcates the border between two climates. The Maya, Maymakan, Ulya and Mati are among the rivers flowing in the district.

A unique orographic feature of the region is the circular, crater-like Kondyor Massif. Minerals mining in the district includes one of the largest Zirconium reserves in Russia, at the Algama mine.

In the sharply continental zone, which gets very little precipitation and is humidity free, average winter and summer temperatures vary from −40 to −45 °C (−40 to −49 °F) and from +26 to +30 °C (79 to 86 °F) respectively.

== Demographics ==
Ethnic composition (2021):

- Evenks – 51.9%
- Russians – 38.8%
- Nivkh – 1.4%
- Altai – 1.3%
- Ukrainians – 1.2%
- Others – 5.4%

== History ==
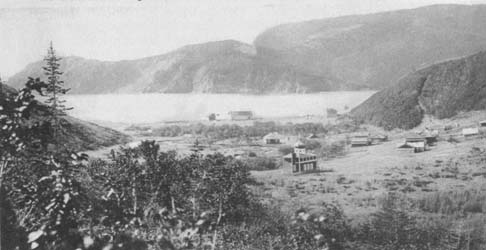
The port of Ayan in the early 20th century

In the 17th century, shortly after the establishment of Yakutsk, the exploration of what is now Ayano-Maysky District pursued two goals. Yakutsk officials through eastward expansion sought to come up with new sources of tribute for the Tsar's treasury while at the same time trying to find a shorter, more convenient passage to the Sea of Okhotsk, in order to continue to care for the needs of rich Russian colonies in the Far East and North America.

In 1639, a group of Russian explorers under the leadership of Ivan Moskvitin reached the Sea of Okhotsk for the first time through the territory of modern Ayano-Maysky District.

In the first half of the 19th century, the Russian-American Company became the first trading company in the region, with its merchant office located in the port of Okhotsk. In 1842, the Company decided to find a better, more advantageous spot for a seaport. Consequently, in 1845 the Russian-American Company's merchant office was moved to Ayan.

Ayan's prosperity, however, was not to last. After the Alaska Purchase, life was virtually brought to a standstill. By 1867, the Russian-American Company was no longer in business. Many local businessmen and professionals joined the exodus of merchants who had discontinued their operations in the area. A recently (1850s) built and much more conveniently located Nikolayevsk-on-Amur became Russia's new main port in the Sea of Okhotsk region.

In the Russian Civil War, the territory of modern Ayano-Maysky District was the scene of the anti-Soviet Yakut Revolt. It was the last enclave of the White Forces, where General Anatoly Pepelyayev did not capitulate until June 17, 1923.

By decree of the Soviet government, Ayano-Maysky District was officially formed on December 10, 1930 by combining the areas of Ayan and Nelkan. Ayan was assigned the role of being the administrative center. In the 1930s, the Soviet government began forming state and collective farms, opened local schools and hospitals, amateur musical clubs, and otherwise encouraged the Evenks to switch from their nomadic lifestyle to a settled way of life.

In 1936, the first local farmers' market was opened with hopes of bringing locals together. State farm workers and private small farm owners sold their meat, wild game, fish, berries, mushrooms, etc.

People who made the decision to make this region their temporary home received added governmental bonuses to their pay and an earlier retirement age: for men when they reached 55 and women at 50.

With the dissolution of the Soviet Union, however, some state farms and enterprises were disbanded and government subsidies discontinued, forcing many residents to move out of the settlements to bigger cities or other regions of Russia.
