= Poyarkov =

Poyarkov (Russian: Поярков) is a Russian surname. Notable people with the surname include:

- Denis Poyarkov (born 1989), Russian former professional football player
- Juvenal Poyarkov (born 1935), Russian hierarch of the Russian Orthodox Church
- Nikolai Poyarkov (born 1999), Russian football player
- Sergey Poyarkov (born 1965), Ukrainian illustrator
- Vassili Poyarkov (c. 1597 – after 1668), first Russian explorer of the Amur region
- Yuriy Poyarkov (1937–2017), Ukrainian-Soviet volleyball player

== See also ==
- Vasiliy Poyarkov (icebreaker), Soviet icebreaker in service from 1963 until 1988
