= Ulya =

Ulya Улья
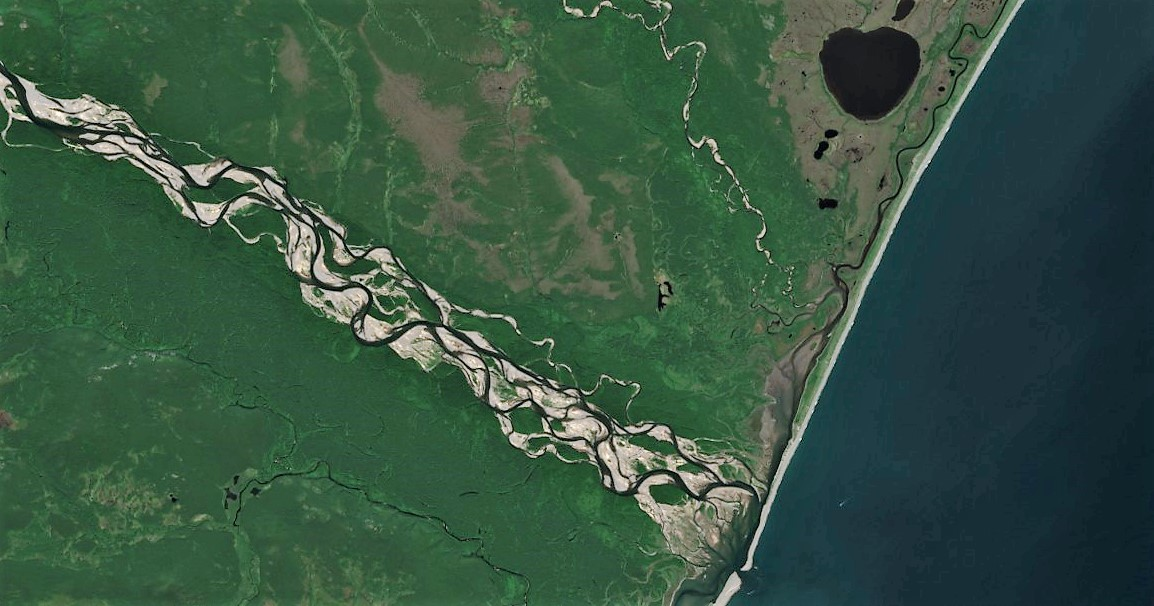
- Last stretch of the Ulya Sentinel-2 image

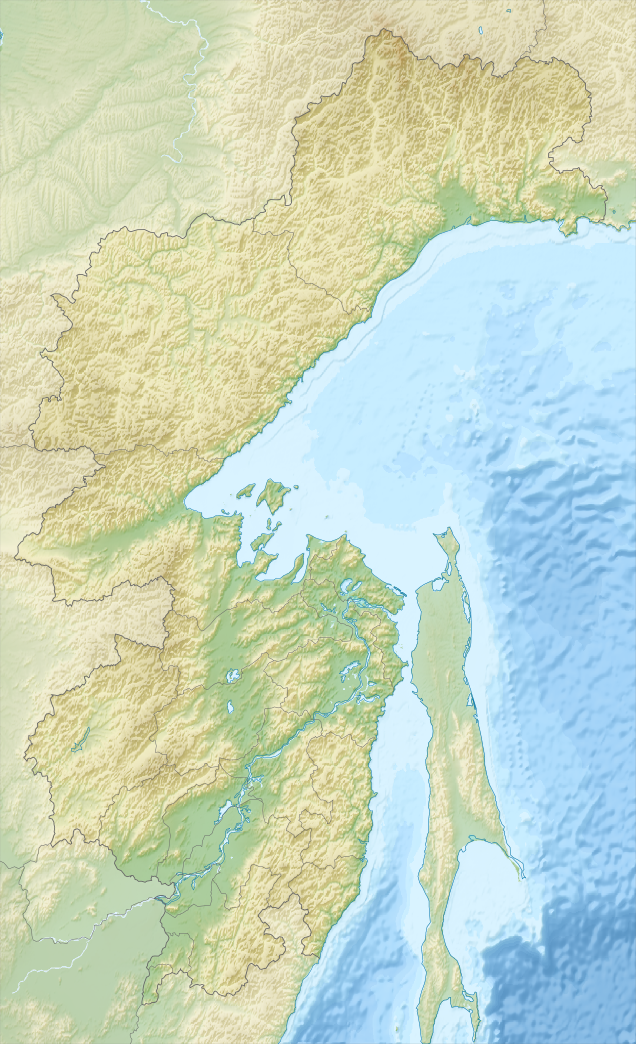
- Mouth location in Khabarovsk Krai, Russia

Location
- Country: Russia

Physical characteristics
- Source: 57°42′59″N 138°37′39″E
  - location: Dzhugdzhur
- Mouth: Sea of Okhotsk
  - coordinates: 58°51′25″N 141°52′26″E
- Length: 325 km (202 mi)
- Basin size: 15,500 km^{2} (6,000 sq mi)

The Ulya (Russian: Улья) is a river in Ayano-Maysky and Okhotsky districts, Khabarovsk Krai in Russia. The length of the river is 325 kilometres (202 mi), the area of its drainage basin is 15,500 square kilometres (6,000 mi^{2}).

The first Russian to reach the Pacific Ocean was Ivan Moskvitin who sailed down the Ulya and wintered near its mouth in 1639. Vasili Poyarkov reused his huts in 1646. The Ulya was one of the water routes to and from Okhotsk. From its tributaries either the Lama Portage or the Alachak Portage led to the Mati which flows north to the Maya, which leads to the Aldan and then the Lena to Yakutsk.

== Course ==
The Ulya originates in the Dzhugdzhur Mountains, flows northeast parallel to the coast and turns east to reach the Sea of Okhotsk about 100 kilometres (62 mi) southwest of Okhotsk. It freezes up in late October through early November and remains icebound until May.

== See also ==
- List of rivers of Russia
