= Ayan, Russia =

Ayan Аян
- Selo
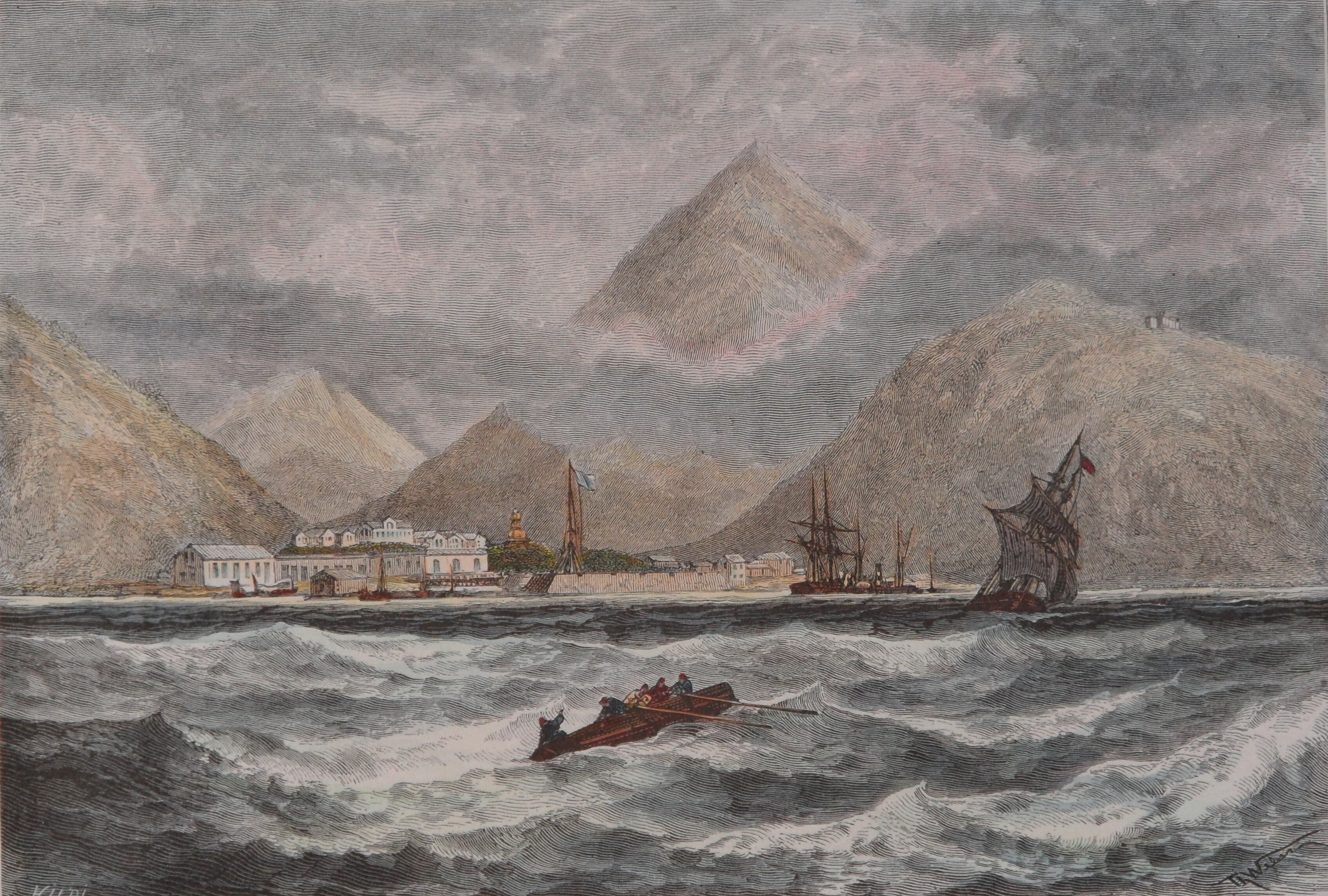
- Ayan harbor in 1870. View from the southeast

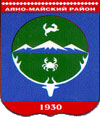
- Coat of arms
- Interactive map of Ayan
- Location of Ayan Ayan (Khabarovsk Krai)
- Coordinates: 56°27′30″N 138°10′05″E
- Country: Russia
- Federal subject: Khabarovsk Krai
- Administrative district: Ayano-Maysky District
- Founded: 1843
- Elevation: 25 m (82 ft)

Population (2010 Census)
  - Total: 967
  - Estimate (2021): 788 (−18.5%)

Administrative status
  - Capital of: Ayano-Maysky District
- Time zone: UTC+10 (MSK+7)
- Postal code: 682571
- OKTMO ID: 08606403101

Ayan (Russian: Аян) is a rural locality (a selo) and the administrative center of Ayano-Maysky District of Khabarovsk Krai, Russia, located on the shore of a well-protected bay of the Sea of Okhotsk, 1,447 kilometers (899 mi) from Khabarovsk and 631 kilometers (392 mi) by sea from Nikolayevsk-on-Amur. Population: 967 (2010 census); 1,325 (2002 census); 2,039 (1989 Soviet census).

== History ==
Around 1840, a decision was made to move the Russian-American Company base from Okhotsk 270 miles (430 km) down the coast to Ayan, because Okhotsk stands on a river mouth protected by a sand bar and is subject to flooding while Ayan is on a circular bay on the south side of a peninsula and can be entered without waiting for a proper wind. The area was poor in fish and shipbuilding timber, but there was said to be a coal deposit nearby. A survey was done in 1840 and work started in 1843 under Vasily Zavoyko of the Russian-American Company. In 1845, an overland route was established to Yakutsk. Several expeditions went south from Ayan to explore the Amur region. In 1849, the naval center was again shifted to Petropavlovsk-Kamchatsky and Zavoyko became governor there.

American and Russian whaleships cruised for bowhead and gray whales off Ayan between 1854 and 1866. They also entered the port for repairs and supplies as well as for shelter from storms. In September 1856, the ship Alexander Coffin (381 tons), Capt. Isaiah Purrington, of New Bedford, was condemned and sold at auction in Ayan. On 10 August, the vessel had run aground Makanrushi during a heavy fog. She was refloated and had to be jury-rigged to reach the port. All the crew and cargo were saved.

During the Crimean War, Ayan was still an important harbor. The harbor was taken by the British fleet on July 9, 1855. Yet the harbor and the little village had been vacated prior to that by the inhabitants. The coast batteries had been destroyed by the Russians, the guns were buried. Ayan was not destroyed. The objective of the British fleet was to destroy all Russian ships they could find. Apart from a small steam tug there were none. The tug had been pulled on shore and was about to be buried at the time of the occupation. The British troops destroyed the tug through an explosion.

With the Amur Annexation in 1860, forces were shifted south to Nikolayevsk-on-Amur and Vladivostok. The Alaska Purchase in 1867 and the end of the Russian-American company further reduced Ayan's importance. Many leading experts of diverse professions joined the exodus of merchants that had discontinued commercial traffic resulting from the trade in the region.

The Yakutsk-Ayan Track supplied Ayan from Yakutsk from 1844 to 1867. It had three sections, first a 235-255 mile road southeast from Yakutsk, crossing the Amga River at Amginsk to Ust-Maya where the Maya River joins the Aldan, then about 250 miles (400 km) south up the Maya to near its southernmost point at Nelkan, and then a 150-mile (240 km) horse trail over the Dzhugdzhur Mountains to Ayan. Because the Maya flows north, it took thirteen to twenty-three days to go north and thirty to forty days to go south. In 1845, the Russian-American Company established ferries and 23 families of settlers, and in 1852, the government spent 20,000 rubles rebuilding the route and settled 211 persons.

In the last decades of the 19th century and in the beginning of the 20th century, assistance amounted to a few steamships a year dispatched from Vladivostok that brought flour, sugar, and household supplies. The remoteness of Ayan resulted in its steady depopulation.

In 1922, Ayan was one of the centers of the Yakut Revolt against Lenin's government. The Red Army besieged Anatoly Pepelyayev's forces in Ayan in June 1923. The fall of Ayan on June 16 marked the end of the Russian Civil War. Ayan served as the administrative center of the Okhotsk-Even National Okrug until 1934.

== Transportation ==
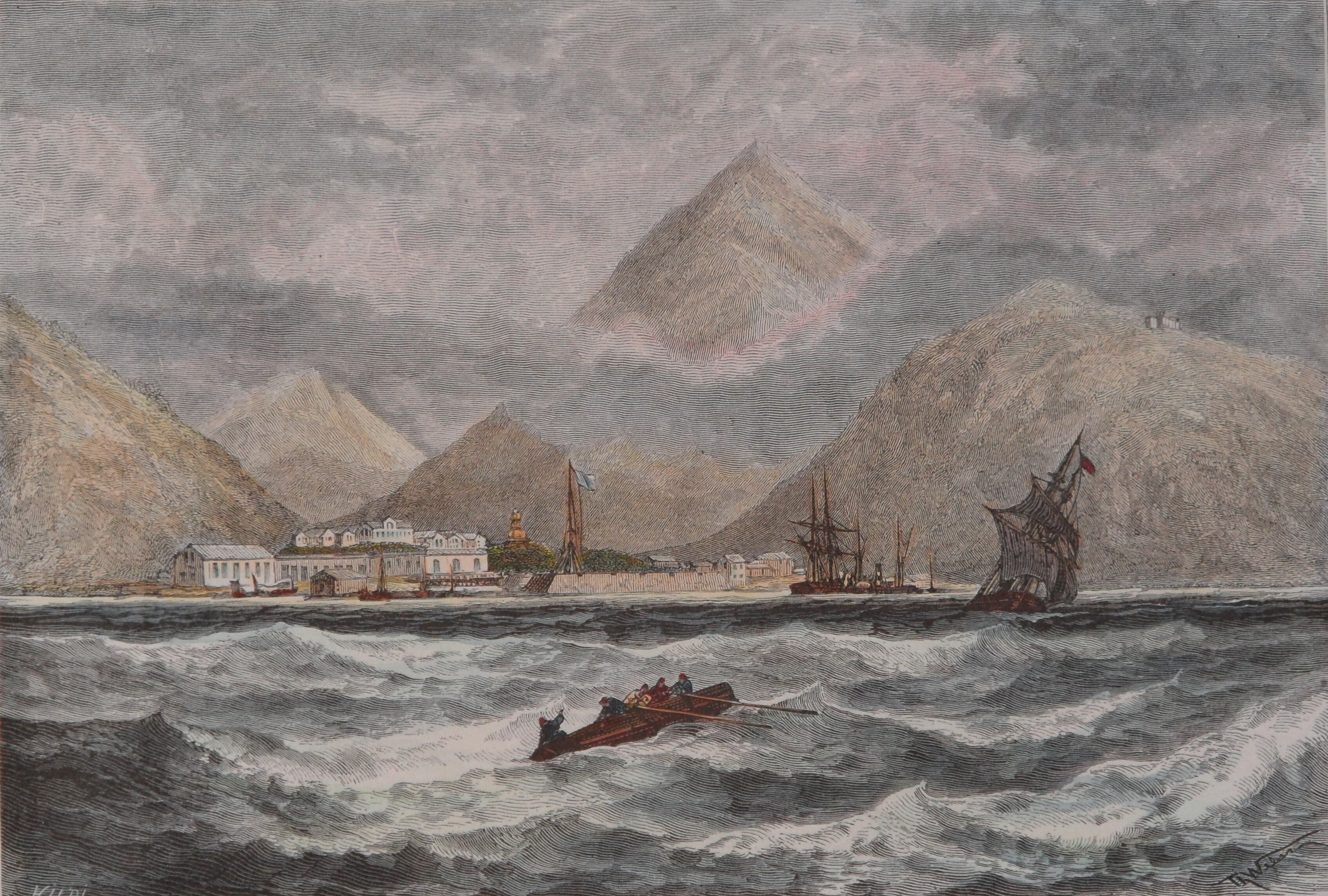
The port of Ayan around 1870 from a southeastern direction

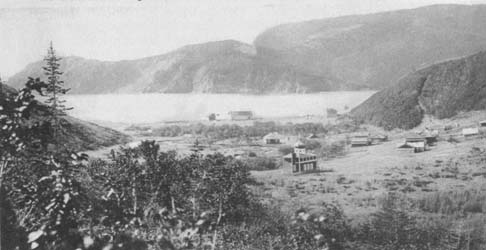
The port of Ayan in the early 20th century

Ayan is served by the Munuk Airport.

== Climate ==
Ayan has a subarctic climate (Köppen Dwc) with severe winters only marginally moderated by its maritime location and mild, wet summers. Its maritime location and favourable aspect for moist summer winds makes the coast around Ayan extremely wet for a subarctic climate and much wetter than interior Siberia, with an average annual rainfall more than four times that of Yakutsk and two-and-a-half times that of Chita.

Climate data for Ayan (1991–2020, extremes 1891–present)
| Month | Jan | Feb | Mar | Apr | May | Jun | Jul | Aug | Sep | Oct | Nov | Dec | Year |
|---|---|---|---|---|---|---|---|---|---|---|---|---|---|
| Record high °C (°F) | 2.7 (36.9) | 2.8 (37.0) | 10.6 (51.1) | 17.5 (63.5) | 30.3 (86.5) | 33.7 (92.7) | 33.2 (91.8) | 30.7 (87.3) | 27.2 (81.0) | 20.0 (68.0) | 10.0 (50.0) | 4.6 (40.3) | 33.7 (92.7) |
| Mean daily maximum °C (°F) | −13.2 (8.2) | −11.8 (10.8) | −5.5 (22.1) | 0.7 (33.3) | 5.9 (42.6) | 11.6 (52.9) | 15.6 (60.1) | 17.5 (63.5) | 13.7 (56.7) | 4.9 (40.8) | −6.6 (20.1) | −12.8 (9.0) | 1.7 (35.1) |
| Daily mean °C (°F) | −16.9 (1.6) | −16 (3) | −9.9 (14.2) | −2.9 (26.8) | 2.3 (36.1) | 7.8 (46.0) | 12.5 (54.5) | 13.9 (57.0) | 9.7 (49.5) | 1.2 (34.2) | −10 (14) | −16.1 (3.0) | −2.0 (28.4) |
| Mean daily minimum °C (°F) | −20.5 (−4.9) | −19.9 (−3.8) | −14.7 (5.5) | −6.4 (20.5) | −0.4 (31.3) | 4.9 (40.8) | 10.0 (50.0) | 10.8 (51.4) | 5.7 (42.3) | −2.5 (27.5) | −13.3 (8.1) | −19.5 (−3.1) | −5.5 (22.1) |
| Record low °C (°F) | −37.9 (−36.2) | −35.6 (−32.1) | −31 (−24) | −23.5 (−10.3) | −14.7 (5.5) | −4.2 (24.4) | 0.4 (32.7) | 0.9 (33.6) | −6.7 (19.9) | −20.2 (−4.4) | −29.6 (−21.3) | −34.7 (−30.5) | −37.9 (−36.2) |
| Average precipitation mm (inches) | 27 (1.1) | 13 (0.5) | 28 (1.1) | 44 (1.7) | 101 (4.0) | 94 (3.7) | 155 (6.1) | 168 (6.6) | 148 (5.8) | 108 (4.3) | 56 (2.2) | 28 (1.1) | 970 (38.2) |
| Average extreme snow depth cm (inches) | 39 (15) | 47 (19) | 53 (21) | 52 (20) | 23 (9.1) | 0 (0) | 0 (0) | 0 (0) | 0 (0) | 3 (1.2) | 20 (7.9) | 32 (13) | 53 (21) |
| Average rainy days | 0 | 0.1 | 0.2 | 1 | 11 | 16 | 19 | 16 | 15 | 8 | 1 | 0.1 | 87 |
| Average snowy days | 10 | 7 | 10 | 14 | 12 | 1 | 0 | 0 | 0 | 8 | 10 | 9 | 81 |
| Average relative humidity (%) | 57 | 55 | 63 | 76 | 83 | 85 | 88 | 83 | 74 | 61 | 54 | 54 | 69 |
| Mean monthly sunshine hours | 97 | 141 | 209 | 183 | 170 | 187 | 152 | 158 | 157 | 151 | 106 | 70 | 1,781 |
Source 1: Pogoda.ru.net
Source 2: NOAA (sun, 1961–1990)
