= Okhotsk Airport =

- IATA: OHO; ICAO: UHOO

Summary
- Airport type: Public
- Serves: Okhotsk
- Location: Okhotsk, Russia
- Coordinates: 59°24′52″N 143°03′32″E
- Interactive map of Okhotsk Airport

Okhotsk Airport (Russian: Аэропорт Охотск) (IATA: OHO, ICAO: UHOO) is a former military airbase in Okhotsk, Russia. It serves small transport aircraft.

== Airlines and destinations ==
Airlines	Destinations
Khabarovsk Airlines	Khabarovsk, Nikolaevsk-on-Amur

== See also ==
- List of airports in Russia
