= Dzhigda =

Dzhigda Джигда
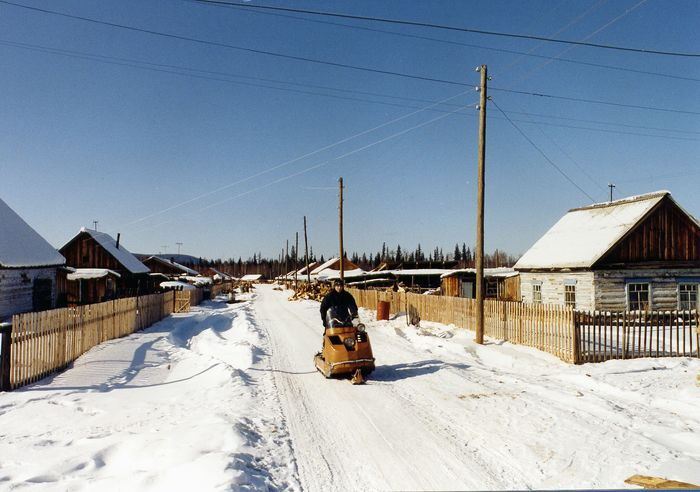
- Village of Dzhigda

- Location in Khabarovsk Krai Dzhigda (Russia)
- Coordinates: 57°33′2″N 135°52′38″E
- Country: Russia
- Federal subject: Khabarovsk Krai
- District: Ayano-Maysky

Government
  - Mayor: Kizilova Albina Anatolyevna

Area
  - Total: 0.25 km^{2} (0.097 sq mi)
- Elevation: 296 m (971 ft)

Population (2022)
  - Total: 230
  - Density: 920/km^{2} (2,400/sq mi)
- Time zone: UTC+7 (VLAT)
- Postal code: 682574
- Area code: +7 42147

Dzhigda, also known as Jigda (Russian: Джигда) is a village in the center of the Ayano-Maysky District, Khabarovsk Krai, Russia along the Maya river. The village is connected by a small road and contains 79 buildings within its jurisdictional area. Dzhigda's total population, of mainly Russians and Evenks, as of 2022, is 230, after having steadily decreased from 1992's census of 432.
