= Khabarovsk Airlines Flight 463 =

2017 aviation accident

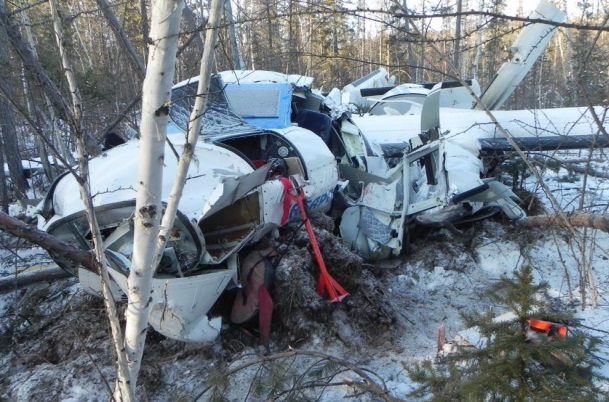
- Wreckage of Flight 463

Accident
- Date: 15 November 2017
- Summary: Loss of control and crash on approach
- Site: Nelkan Airport, Russia; 57°38′29″N 136°09′30″E

Aircraft
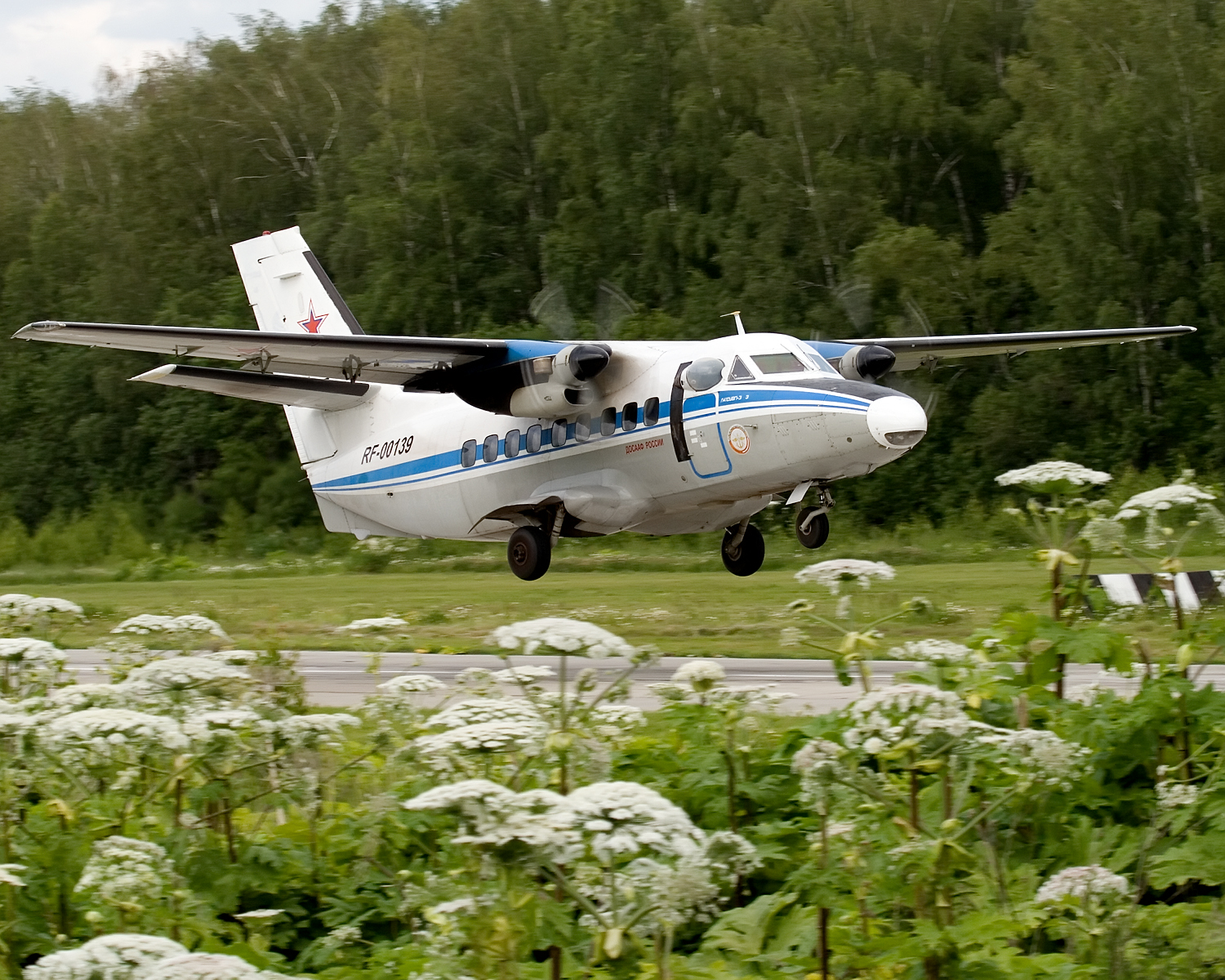
- A Let L-410 Turbolet similar to the aircraft involved
- Aircraft type: Let L-410 Turbolet
- Operator: Khabarovsk Airlines
- ICAO flight No.: RNI463
- Registration: RA-67047
- Flight origin: Nikolayevsk-on-Amur Airport
- Destination: Nelkan Airport
- Occupants: 7
- Passengers: 5
- Crew: 2
- Fatalities: 6
- Injuries: 1
- Survivors: 1

Khabarovsk Airlines Flight 463 was a scheduled domestic passenger flight from Nikolayevsk-on-Amur Airport to Nelkan Airport in Russia. On 15 November 2017 the Let L-410 Turbolet operating the flight crashed short of the runway at Nelkan Airport, killing all but one of the seven people on board. The sole survivor was a three-year-old girl who sustained serious injuries. The crash was caused by a malfunction of the right engine's propeller.

== Accident ==
During approach to runway 04 at Nelkan airport, the aircraft suddenly lost speed, rolled 180 degrees to the left, and crashed into a forest 2 kilometres (1.2 mi; 1.1 nmi) from the runway. Both pilots (who were also the only crew members on board) and four of the five passengers on board were killed. There were no fatalities on the ground.

== Aircraft ==
The aircraft involved was an Let 410UVP-E20, registration RA-67047, msn 3010. It first flew in 2015 and was powered by two General Electric H80-200 engines. At the time of the accident, the aircraft had flown for 1,693 hours and completed 1,071 flights.

== Passengers and crew ==
There were five passengers and two crew members, totaling up to seven people.

The captain was 42-year-old Igor Leonidovich Shumakov, who had 12,076 flight hours, including 1,243 hours on the Let L-410 Turbolet. The first officer was 30-year old Alexander Alexandrovich Zuev, who had 1,220 flight hours with 837 of them on the Let L-410 Turbolet. One survivor, a child age 3 years, was severely injured.

== Investigation ==
The Interstate Aviation Committee (Russian: Межгосударственный авиационный комитет) investigated the accident with assistance from the Czech Air Accidents Investigation Institute (Czech: Ústav pro odborné zjišťování příčin leteckých nehod), representing the state of manufacture of the aircraft. A preliminary report was released on 22 December 2017. The final report was released in August 2019. The cause of the accident was that the propeller on the right hand engine had gone into negative pitch in flight, leading to a loss of control. Twenty-four safety recommendations were made.

== Safety actions ==
At the time of the accident, there were no instructions given to pilots for use in the event of a propeller going into beta range in flight. The risk of this happening being assessed as 1 in 10^{−14}. Following the accident, and evidence being found of other occurrences, an instruction was issued that the affected propeller was to be feathered and the flight completed on one engine.

== See also ==
- List of accidents and incidents involving the Let L-410 Turbolet
- List of aviation accidents and incidents with a sole survivor
