= Khabarovsk Novy Airport =

Airport in Khabarovsk, Russia

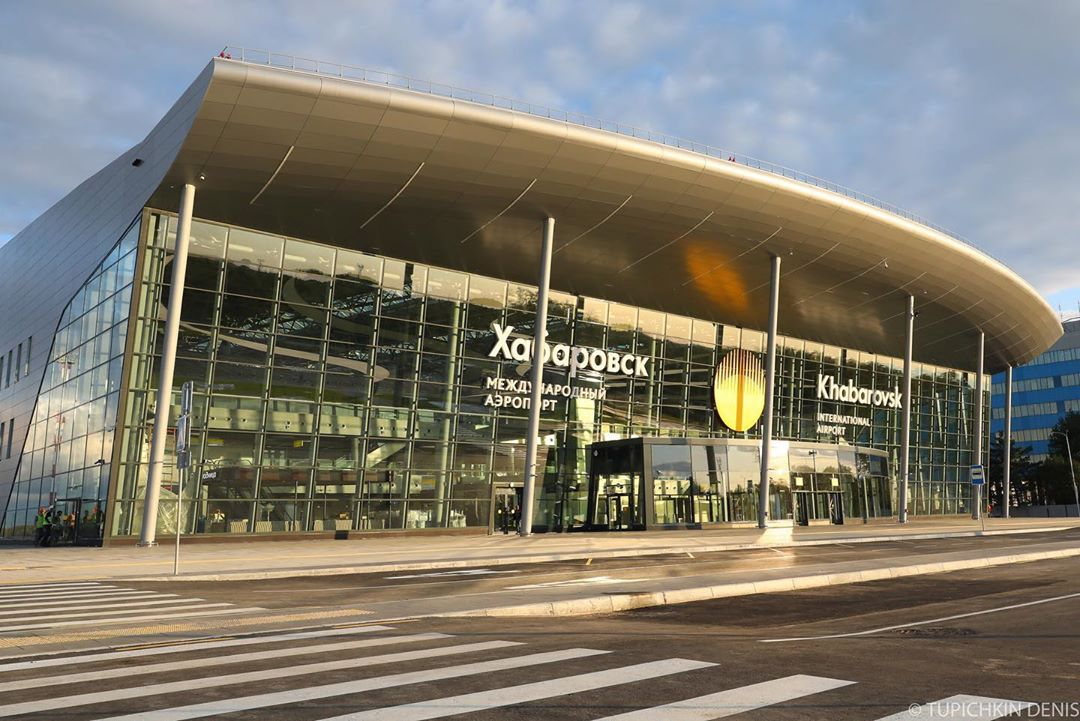
- IATA: KHV; ICAO: UHHH; LID: ХБР

Summary
- Airport type: Public
- Owner: Government of the Khabarovsky Region
- Operator: JSC Khabarovsk Airport
- Serves: Khabarovsk
- Location: Khabarovsk, Russia
- Hub for: Aurora; Khabarovsk Airlines; S7 Airlines; Vostok Aviation Company; Yakutia Airlines; Nordwind Airlines; Pegas Fly
- Elevation AMSL: 244 ft (74 m)
- Coordinates: 48°31′41″N 135°11′18″E
- Website: khv.aero

Map
- Location of airport in Khabarovsk

Runways
| Direction | Length | | Surface |
| Direction | ft | m | Surface |
|---|---|---|---|
| 05R/23L | 13,124 | 4,000 | Concrete |
| 05L/23R | 11,483 | 3,500 | Asphalt |

Statistics (2018)
- Passengers: 2,134,476
- Sources: Russian Federal Air Transport Agency (see also provisional 2018 statistics)

Khabarovsk Novy Airport (Russian: Аэропорт Хабаровск) (IATA: KHV, ICAO: UHHH) is an airport located at the eastern part of Khabarovsk, Khabarovsk Krai, Russia. Khabarovsk Novy Airport was the main hub for the Russian airline Dalavia, which was shut down by the government due to large debts. Vladivostok Air replaced the role of Dalavia, and Khabarovsk was "upgraded" into a secondary hub for Vladivostok Air. Vladivostok Air was later merged into Aurora.

In 2015, Khabarovsk Novy International Airport carried 1,821,694 passengers.

A small airfield is adjacent to the west side of Khabarovsk Novy, and is known as Khabarovsk MVL (малых воздушных линий, literally "Small Airlines"). It handles charter and general aviation operations, and has a runway length of 960 m (3150 ft).

== History ==
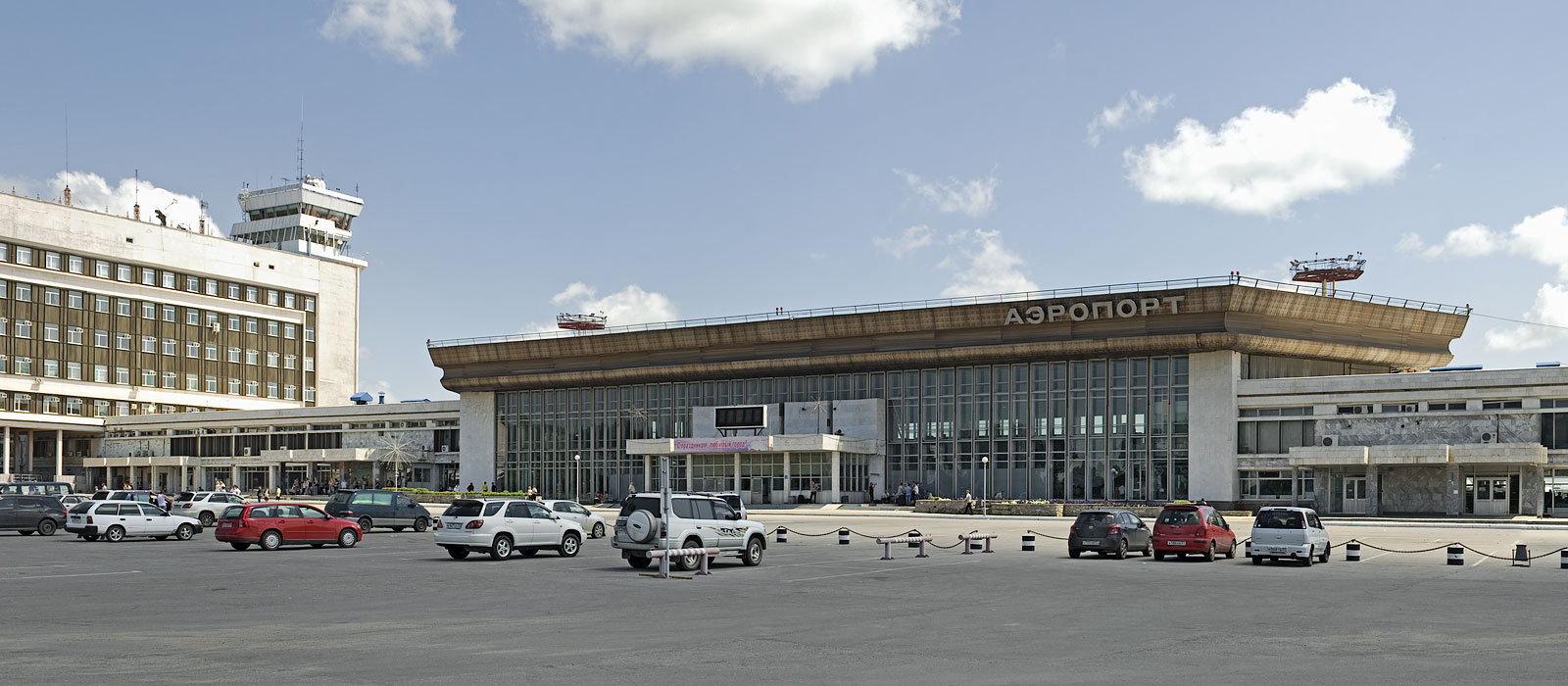
Novy Airport old terminal

By 1931, hydroports in the area were not enough to serve the growing demand for air travel, and there was a need to find a place to build a new airport. The first airport in the current location was opened in 1938. The year 1953 saw the commissioning of a runway with artificial turf with size of 2,500 × 80m. On 21 March 1954, a terminal with a capacity of 400 passengers per hour was put into operations. In 1964, a new, larger terminal was built.

In 1970, the airport was given international status and completed its first charter international flight, Khabarovsk–Osaka (Japan). On board were the participants of the international exhibition Expo '70.

During 1991, Alaska Airlines began flights from the United States, using Boeing 727 jets for passenger flights between Khabarovsk and Ted Stevens International Airport in Anchorage, Alaska. These flights stopped at Magadan, Russia.

=== New terminal construction ===
In 2016, the old, abandoned terminal was demolished, and on its site, the construction of a new terminal commenced. The new terminal was planned to be equipped with new air-bridges and escalators and was to be integrated with the current Soviet-built terminal. The new terminal was opened in 2019.

== Airlines and destinations ==
| Airlines | Destinations |
|---|---|
| Aeroflot | Moscow–Sheremetyevo; Seasonal: Bangkok–Suvarnabhumi, Phuket, Sanya |
| Aurora | Anadyr, Beijing–Daxing, Blagoveshchensk, Chita, Harbin, Irkutsk, Krasnoyarsk–International, Magadan, Neryungri, Nogliki, Novosibirsk, Okha, Petropavlovsk-Kamchatsky, Shakhtyorsk, Shanghai-Pudong, Tynda, Ulan-Ude, Vladivostok, Yakutsk, Yuzhno-Sakhalinsk, Zeya; Seasonal: Kavalerovo |
| Azur Air | Seasonal charter: Nha Trang, Pattaya, Phuket |
| Centrum Air | Samarqand |
| Chengdu Airlines | Harbin, Jiamusi |
| China Express Airlines | Jiamusi, Tianjin |
| IrAero | Chita, Kalibo, Vladivostok, Yuzhno-Sakhalinsk; Seasonal charter: Dalian |
| Ikar | Seasonal charter: Nha Trang |
| Khabarovsk Airlines | Nikolayevsk-on-Amur, Okhotsk; Seasonal: Bogorodskoye |
| Rossiya Airlines | Krasnoyarsk–International, Moscow–Sheremetyevo, Vladivostok, Yuzhno-Sakhalinsk |
| S7 Airlines | Beijing–Daxing, Irkutsk, Magadan, Novosibirsk, Vladivostok, Yakutsk, Yuzhno-Sakhalinsk |
| Ural Airlines | Yekaterinburg |
| Uzbekistan Airways | Tashkent |
| Vietjet Air | Seasonal charter: Da Nang, Nha Trang |
| Vostok Aviation Company | Ayan, Chumikan, Kherpuchi, Nelkan; Seasonal: Bogorodskoye, Novokurovka, Pobeda |
| Yakutia Airlines | Anadyr, Chita, Neryungri, Ulan-Ude, Yakutsk; Seasonal: Mirny; Seasonal charter: Dalian, Qinhuangdao, Weihai, Yantai, Yichang |

== See also ==
- List of the busiest airports in Russia
- List of the busiest airports in the former USSR

== Notes ==
- "Khabarovsk - Novy Airport (KHV/UHHH)". A-Z Publications.
- (in Russian) Airport Khabarovsk (Novy) Aviateka.Handbook
