= Khabarovsk Airlines =

Russian airline

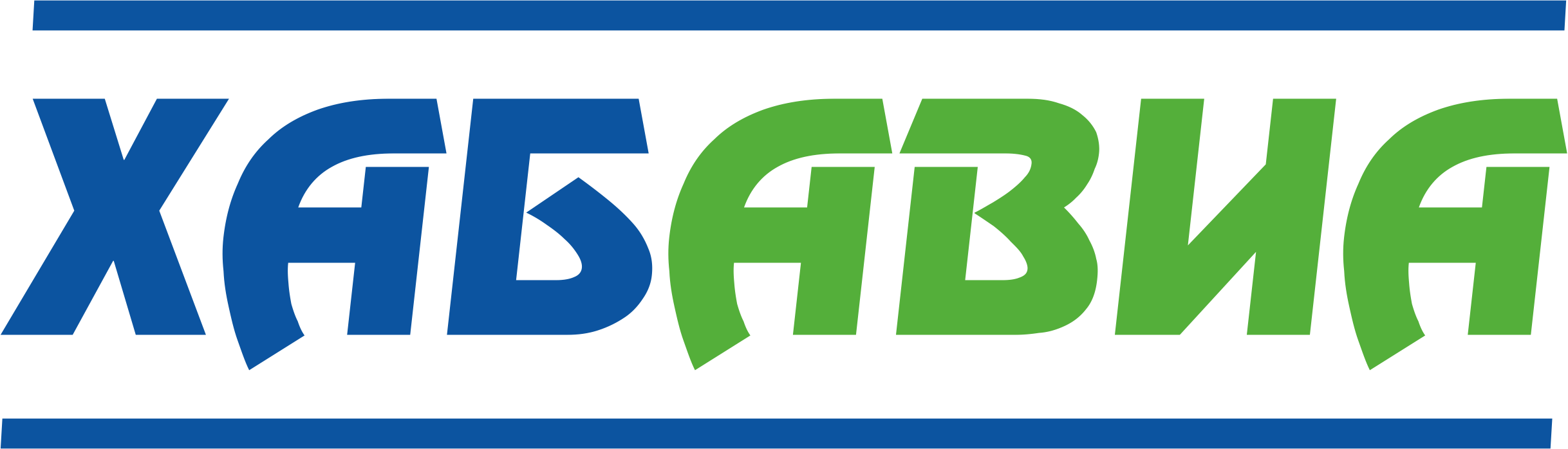
IATA	ICAO	Call sign
?	KHF	KHABAROVSK
- Founded: 2004
- Commenced operations: 2004
- Operating bases: Khabarovsk Novy Airport; Nikolayevsk-on-Amur Airport
- Fleet size: 11 (July 7, 2021)
- Destinations: 10
- Headquarters: Nikolayevsk-on-Amur, Khabarovsk Krai, Russia
- Website: khabavia.ru

Khabarovsk Airlines (Russian: Хабаровские авиалинии, Khabarovskie avialinii), stylised KhabAvia (Russian: ХабАвиа, KhabAvia), is a Russian state-owned airline with bases at Khabarovsk and Nikolayevsk-on-Amur. Established in 2004, the airline operates nine Antonov and Let aircraft as of December 2016. Its flight schedule, accessed in December 2016, states that Khabarovsk Airlines flies to ten destinations. In 2020, it became part of Russia's single far-eastern airline, along with four other airlines. It is currently banned from flying into the EU.

== History ==
In September 29, 2003, the Khabarovsk government established the Regional State Unitary Enterprise (KSUE) Khabarovsk Airlines, established in April 2004 on the basis of the Nikolaev United Aviation Squadron.

The official date of birth of the Nikolaev air squadron, according to the order of the Civil Air Fleet No. 98, is August 8, 1934. On the date of creation, the air unit consisted of 3 Sh-2 aircraft; In 1948, on the basis of this flight, the 257th air squadron was organized, the fleet of which was replenished with 3 PO-2 aircraft.

In 1951, the 144th Combined Air Squadron was organized; In the same year, the first An-2 aircraft joined the squadron. In 1956, the PO-2 aircraft were replaced by the Yak-12T aircraft. In the same year, the first-born Mi-1 helicopter appeared at the airport. In 1958, flights began to be carried out on more powerful and heavier Li-2 aircraft. In 1960, new Mi-4 helicopters entered service.

In 1963, the 144th Flight Squadron was transformed into the Nikolaev-on-Amur United Air Squadron. In 1971, the first comfortable Mi-8 helicopter appeared in the sky over Nikolaevsk-on-Amur, later the Mi-2 helicopter arrived, replacing the Mi-1.

In 1984, the Nikolaevsky-on-Amur united air squadron received new turboprop aircraft L-410UVP, L-410UVP E. In 1994, the airline began operating its own comfortable Yak-40 aircraft.

Khabarovsk Airlines continued to develop new types of aircraft for the enterprise. Thus, in 2005, the An-26-100 cargo-passenger aircraft was put into operation, in 2009 An-24 passenger aircraft were purchased and are still in operation.

== Corporate affairs ==
The airline is headquartered at Nikolayevsk-on-Amur Airport in Khabarovsk Krai, Russia.

== Destinations ==
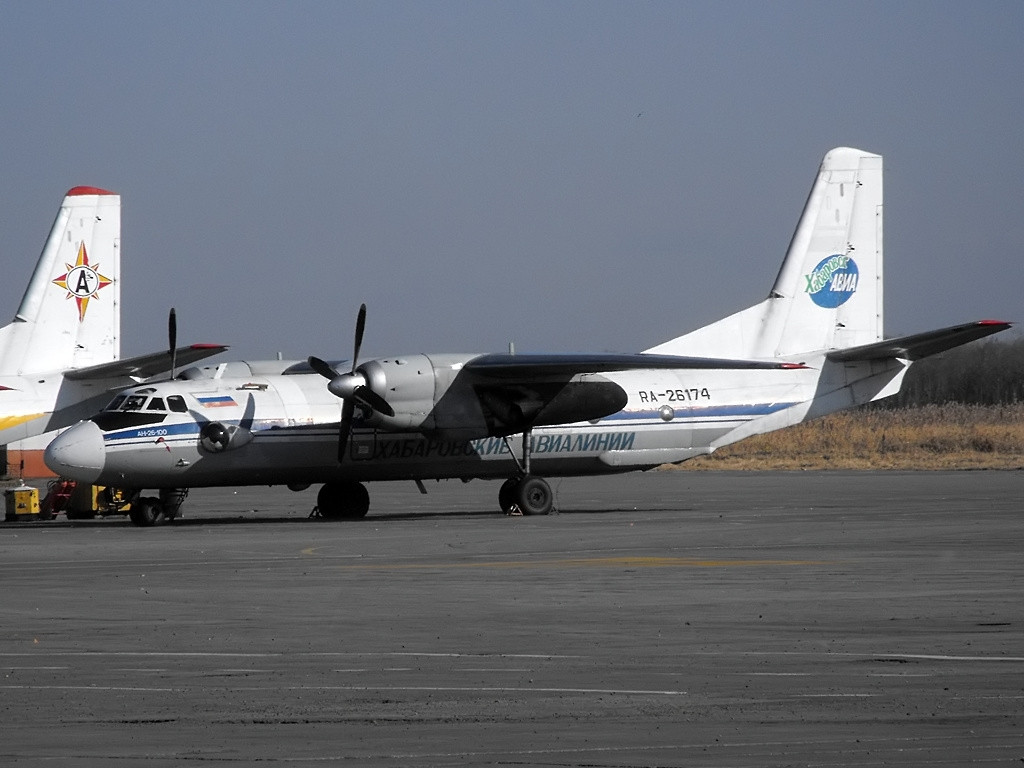
A Khabarovsk Airlines Antonov An-26 at Khabarovsk Novy Airport in 2009

Khabarovsk Airlines' flight schedule, accessed in December 2016, (Note: The webpage does not indicate when it was last updated.) lists the following destinations, all of which are located in the Russian krai of Khabarovsk:

City	Airport	Notes
Ayan	Munuk Airport	—
Bogorodskoye	Bogorodskoye Airport	—
Chumikan	Chumikan Airport	—
Kherpuchi	Kherpuchi Airport	—
Khabarovsk	Khabarovsk Novy Airport	Base
Komsomolsk-on-Amur	Komsomolsk-on-Amur Airport	—
Nelkan	Nelkan Airport	—
Nikolayevsk-on-Amur	Nikolayevsk-on-Amur Airport	Base
Okhotsk	Okhotsk Airport	—
Sovetskaya Gavan	Sovetskaya Gavan Airport	—

== Fleet ==
As of January 2024, Khabarovsk Airlines operates the following aircraft:

Khabarovsk Airlines fleet
Aircraft	In service	Passengers	Notes
Antonov An-24RV	4	50	—
Antonov An-26-100	1	40	—
Antonov An-26B	1	40	—
Let L-410 UVP-E20	5	19	—
Total	11		

== Accidents and incidents ==
- On 21 July 2010, Flight 9236, an Antonov An-12BK operating a cargo flight from Keperveyem to Komsomolsk-on-Amur, was taking off when its nose gear failed. The aircraft skid off the runway, severely damaging the landing gear and the underside of the fuselage; it was damaged beyond repair. All eight occupants of the aircraft survived.
- On 15 November 2017, Flight 463, operated by Let L-410UVP-E20 RA-67047, crashed on approach to Nelkan Airport, killing six of the seven people on board. The aircraft was operating a scheduled domestic passenger flight from Nikolayevsk-on-Amur Airport.
