= Chumikan Airport =

Airport in Khabarovsk Krai, Russia

Chumikan Airport Чумикан аэропорт
- IATA: none; ICAO: UHHY; LID: ЧМИ

Summary
- Airport type: Public
- Serves: Chumikan, Khabarovsk Krai, Russia
- Coordinates: 54°41′07″N 135°17′00″E

Map
- Location of the airport in Russia
- Source: Great Circle Mapper

Chumikan Airport (Russian: Аэропорт Чумикан, Aėroport Chumikan) (ICAO: UHHY) is an airport serving Chumikan in Khabarovsk Krai, Russia. Per its flight schedule, accessed in December 2016, Khabarovsk Airlines serves the airport with flights to Khabarovsk.

== Airlines and destinations ==
Airlines	Destinations
Khabarovsk Airlines	Khabarovsk
Vostok Aviation Company	Khabarovsk

== Accidents and incidents ==
- On 2 August 1973, an Antonov An-2R operated by Aeroflot suffered engine failure and crash-landed near Chumikan.

== See also ==
- List of airports in Russia
