= Vassili Poyarkov =

Russian explorer (c. 1596 – after 1668)

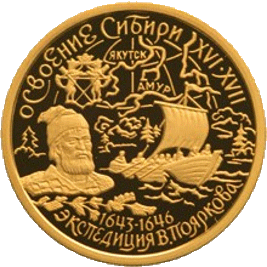
2001 coin of Bank of Russia

Vassili Danilovich Poyarkov (Russian: Василий Данилович Поярков; c. 1597 – after 1668) was a zemleprokhodets, the first Russian explorer of the Amur region in Siberia.

== Life ==
The Russian expansion into Siberia began with the conquest of the Khanate of Sibir in 1582. By 1639 they reached the Pacific 65 miles southeast of the mouth of the Ulya River. East of the Yenisei River there was little land fit for agriculture, except Dauria, the land between the Stanovoy Mountains and the Amur River which was nominally controlled by China. Poyarkov was sent to explore this land.

In 1640, he was in Yakutsk as pismenyy golova (roughly, in charge of records and correspondence). In June 1643, Poyarkov with 133 men started out from Yakutsk. They were sent by the voevoda of Yakutsk, Peter Golovin. Having no idea of the proper route, Poyarkov travelled up the rivers Lena, Aldan, Uchur, Gonam. Delayed by 64 portages, it was early winter before he reached the Stanovoy watershed. Leaving 49 men to overwinter, he pushed south over the mountains in December to reach the upper Zeya River in Daur country, where he found a land of farmers with domestic animals, proper houses and Chinese trade goods who paid tribute to the Manchus who were just starting their conquest of China. He built a winter fort near the mouth of the Umlekan river. To extract supplies from the natives, he employed excessive brutality, thereby provoking their hostility and making supplies harder to get. His men survived on a diet of pine bark, stolen food, stray forest animals and native captives whom they cannibalized.

By the spring of 1644, only forty of his men were left alive. Joined now by the overwintering party, they pushed down the Zeya to the Amur. Their reputation having preceded them, they had to fight their way down the Amur through numerous ambushes. By fall they reached the Gilyak country at the mouth of the Amur. With so many enemies behind him, Poyarkov thought it unwise to return by the same route. That winter they built boats and the next spring worked their way up the Sea of Okhotsk coast to the Ulia River and spent the next winter in the huts that had been built by Ivan Moskvitin six years earlier. The next spring, they followed Moskvitin's route along the Maya River back to Yakutsk, arriving almost exactly three years after they left.

Like so many Russian explorers and colonists in Siberia, Poyarkov received no reward. His brutal treatment of Siberian natives had made enemies even among his own men. The voivode of Yakutsk sent him to Moscow for trial and an unknown fate. Whatever the authorities thought of Poyarkov himself, they were happy with the information he supplied. The next Russian expedition to the Amur was led by Yerofei Khabarov in 1650. See also Russian-Manchu border conflicts.

The 1963-built icebreaker Ledokol-4 was renamed Vasiliy Poyarkov in 1996.

== See also ==
- List of incidents of cannibalism

== Sources ==
- "Поярков, Василий" . Brockhaus and Efron Encyclopedic Dictionary (in Russian). 1906.
- W. Bruce Lincoln, 'The Conquest of a Continent', 1994
