= Maymakan =

River in Khabarovsk Krai, Russia

Maymakan Маймакан
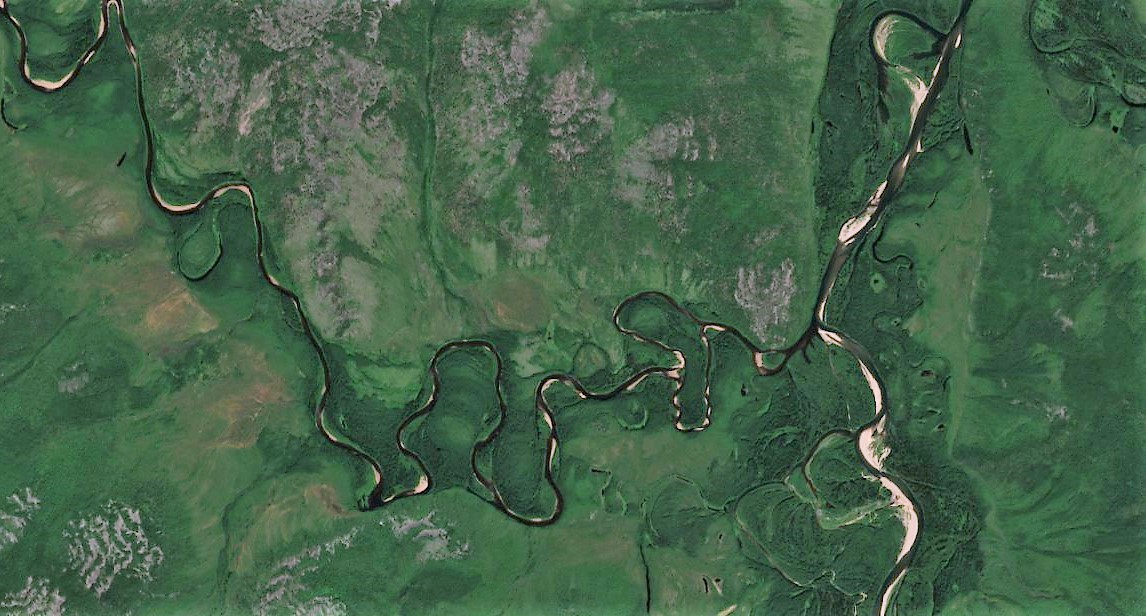
- Confluence of the Maymakan with the Chumikan (left) Sentinel-2 image

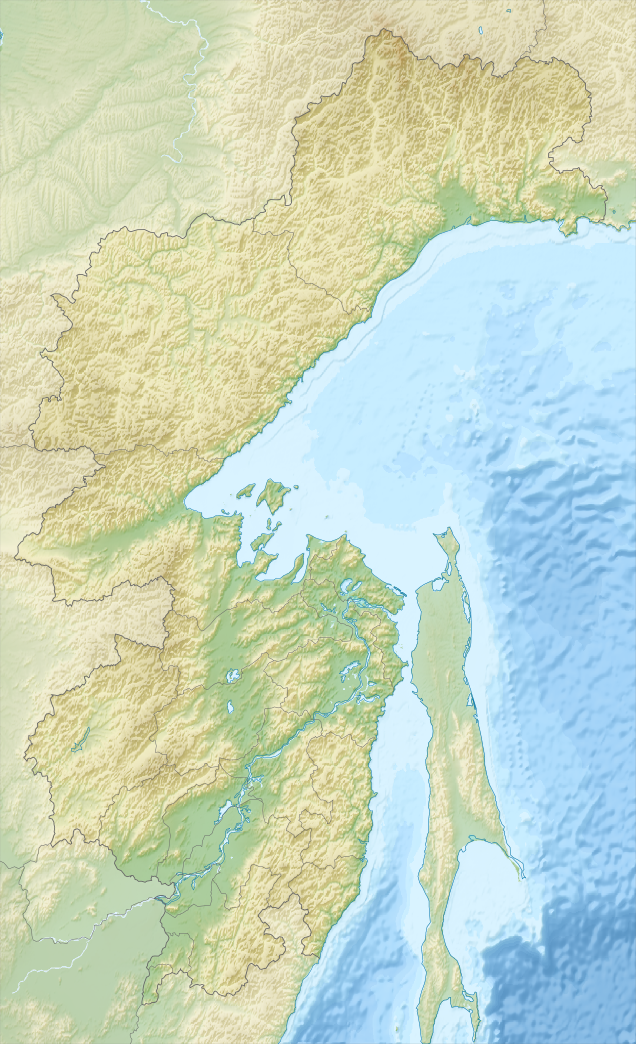
- Mouth location in Khabarovsk Krai, Russia

Location
- Country: Russia

Physical characteristics
- Source: Dzhugdzhur
  - coordinates: 55°41′54″N 134°22′49″E
- Mouth: Maya
  - coordinates: 57°39′04″N 135°28′30″E
  - elevation: 274 m (899 ft)
- Length: 421 km (262 mi)
- Basin size: 18,900 km^{2} (7,300 sq mi)
- Discharge
  - average: 135 cubic metres per second (4,800 cu ft/s)

Basin features
- Progression: Maya → Aldan→ Lena→ Laptev Sea

The Maymakan (Russian: Маймакан) is a river in Ayano-Maysky District, Khabarovsk Krai, Russian Far East. With a length of 421 km (262 mi), it is the second longest tributary of the Maya. Its drainage basin 18,900 square kilometres (7,300 mi^{2}).

The area of the Maymakan has been traditionally inhabited by Evens. The river flows across mostly desolate territory.

== Course ==
The Maymakan originates in the southwestern sector of the Dzhugdzhur mountains. It heads roughly northeastwards as a mountain river, flowing tumultuously with rapids and riffles through rocky gorges. About two thirds down its course it bends slightly and flows northwards, meandering in the floodplain in its lower course. Finally it flows into the left bank of the Maya 479 km (298 mi) from its mouth in the Aldan. The river is fed by snow and rain. It freezes around late October and stays frozen until mid May.

=== Tributaries ===
The main tributaries of the Maymakan are the 134 kilometres (83 mi) long Chumikan from the left, as well as the 164 kilometres (102 mi) long Magey, the 99 kilometres (62 mi) long Nagim, the 84 kilometres (52 mi) long Kundumi, the 82 kilometres (51 mi) long Odola and the 51 kilometres (32 mi) long Mukitkan from the right. There are about 500 lakes in the river basin.

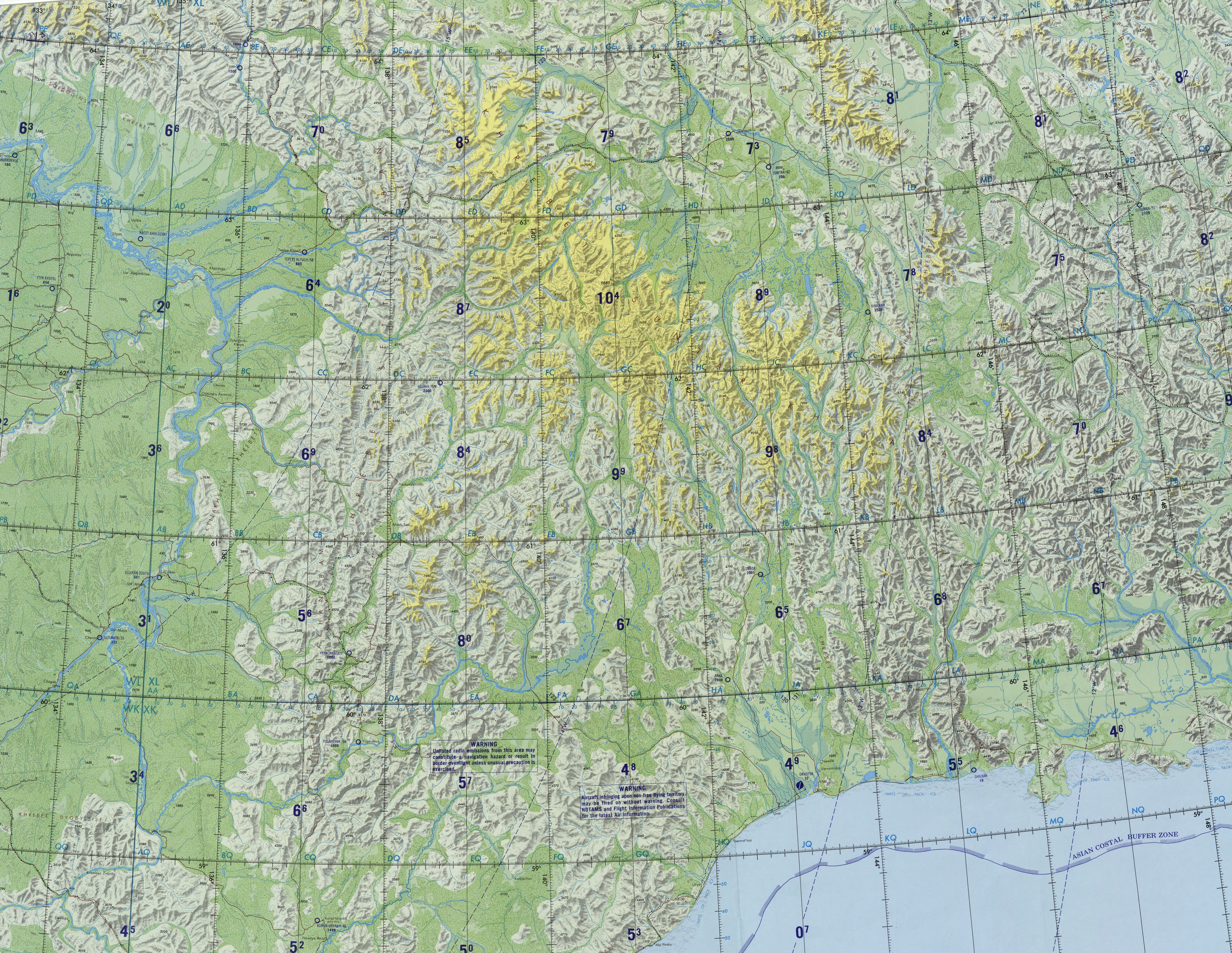
ONC map showing the northern shore of the Sea of Okhotsk.

== Fauna ==
Taimen, pike, perch and lenok are the main fish species found in the waters of the Maymakan.

== See also ==
- List of rivers of Russia
