= Algama mine =

Zirconium mine in Khabarovsk Krai, Russia

- Location within Russia

Location
- Location: Khabarovsk Krai, Russia; 58°40′N 135°29′E

Production
- Products: zirconium

The Algama mine is a large zirconium mine located in Russian Far East in Ayano-Maysky District of Khabarovsk Krai. Algama represents one of the largest zirconium reserves in Russia having estimated reserves of 93.7 million tonnes of ore grading 4.62% zirconium metal. It is located at the southeast edge of the Stanovoy block of the North Asian Craton.
