= Antonov An-38 =

Regional airliner by Antonov

An-38
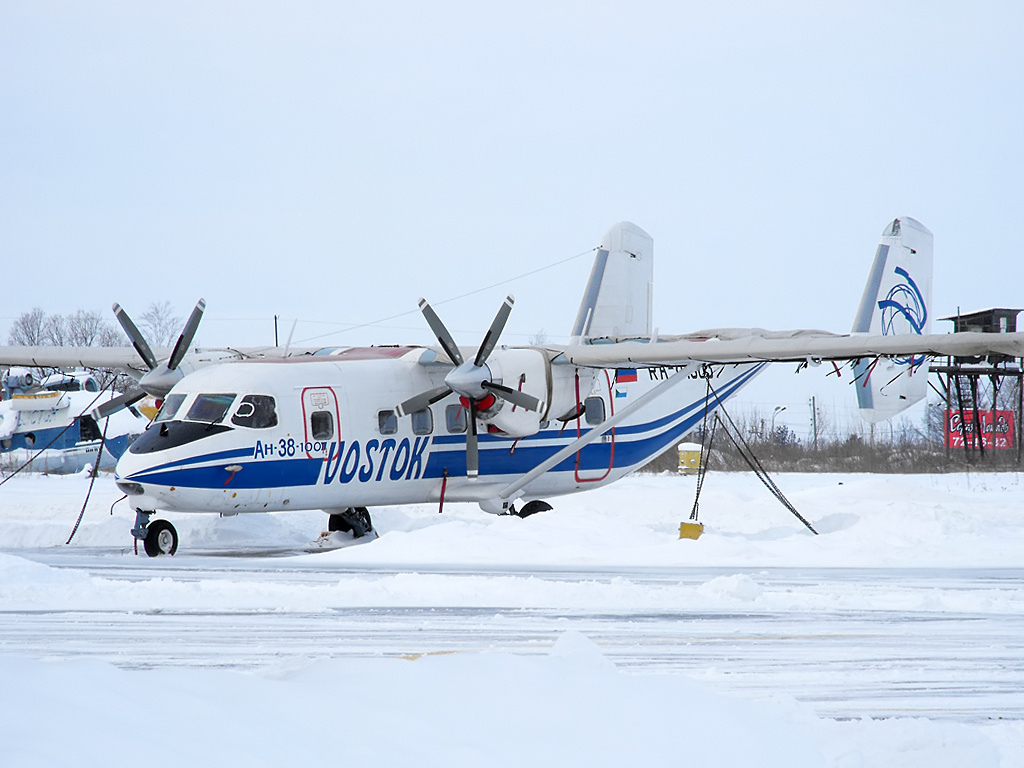
- Antonov An-38-100 of Vostok Aviation Company

General information
- Type: Turboprop regional airliner
- Manufacturer: Novosibirsk Aircraft Production Association
- Designer: Antonov
- Status: In limited service
- Primary user: ALROSA
- Number built: 11 (2 operational)

History
- Introduction date: 2000
- First flight: 23 June 1994
- Developed from: Antonov An-28

The Antonov An-38 is a stretched and upgraded version of Antonov's earlier An-28. It is a twin-engined turboprop transport aircraft, designed by the Antonov Design Bureau in Kyiv, Ukraine. Production is in Novosibirsk, Russia, but some crucial parts are also made in Ukraine and Belarus. It first flew in 1994, and received international flight certification in April 2000. A total of 11 were built and 2 remain in airline service as of August 2019.

== Development ==
Impetus for a stretch of the Antonov An-28 design began with a 1989 sales tour in India, where it became clear that a significant market existed for an aircraft similar to the An-28, but with seating in the 25–30 seat range. The design was approved a year later, and was displayed at the 1991 Paris Air Show as a model.

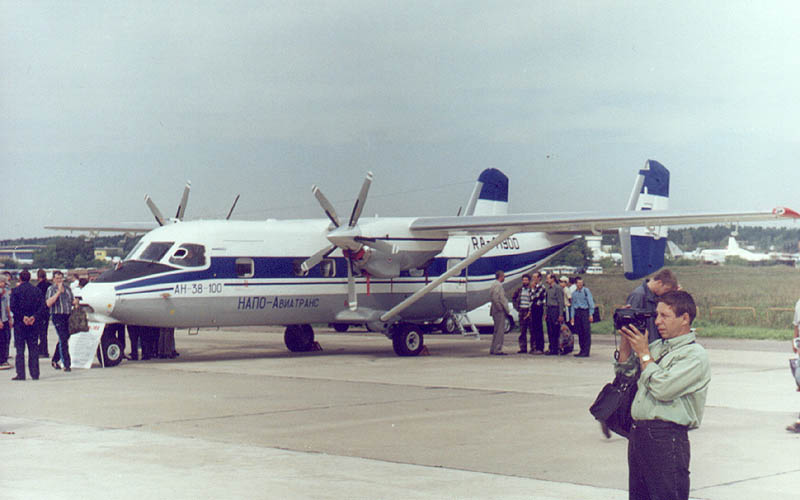
Antonov An-38-100 at MAKS 1999.

The An-38 is of a similar design to the older An-28, featuring the same wings and tail; but it has a longer fuselage and includes several enhancements, such as higher fuel efficiency, increased comfort (cabin and cockpit), and decreased internal noise, coupled with better sound insulation. Other improvements include an increase in passengers to 27, thanks to an increase in maximum payload to 2,500 kg (5,500 lbs), as well as a maximum speed of 405 km/h (250 mph). Its design also enables it to operate in adverse conditions—it is equipped with weather radar, sophisticated navigational systems, and low pressure tires that allow it to operate from primitive, unpaved and icy airfields. Furthermore, the aircraft is more resistant to stalling at high angles of attack and is stable and maneuverable with ice on the wing and tail assembly.

== Civil operators ==
As of August 2019, 2 Antonov An-38 aircraft remain in airline service with ALROSA. Recent reviews suggest only one remains in service in 2021.

Former operators Russia

- Vostok Aviation Company

== Specifications (An-38-100) ==
Data from Jane's All The World's Aircraft 2003–2004, Jane's All The World's Aircraft 2000–2001

General characteristics

- Crew: 2
- Capacity: 26-27 passengers / 2,500 kg (5,512 lb) max payload
- Length: 15.67 m (51 ft 5 in)
- Wingspan: 22.06 m (72 ft 5 in)
- Height: 4.6 m (15 ft 1 in)
- Airfoil: TsAGI R-II-14 (14%)
- Empty weight: 5,300 kg (11,684 lb)
- Max takeoff weight: 8,800 kg (19,401 lb)
- Fuel capacity: 2,210 kg (4,872 lb)
- Powerplant: 2 × Honeywell TPE331-14GR-801E turboprop engines, 1,118 kW (1,499 hp) each

(or 2x 1,029 kW (1,380 shp) Omsk MKB Mars TVD-20 turboprop engines driving AV-36 propellers)

- Propellers: 5-bladed Hartzell Propeller HC-B5MA, 2.85 m (9 ft 4 in) diameter constant-speed fully-feathering reversible-pitch propellers

Performance

- Maximum speed: 405 km/h (252 mph, 219 kn)
- Cruise speed: 380 km/h (240 mph, 210 kn) at 4,200 m (13,800 ft)
- Range: 1,650 km (1,030 mi, 890 nmi) with 9 passengers + 45 minutes reserve

1,450 km (900 mi; 780 nmi) with 17 passengers + 45 minutes reserve
600 km (370 mi; 320 nmi) with 27 passengers + 45 minutes reserve

- Take-off run: 350 m (1,150 ft)
- Landing run: 270 m (890 ft)
- Balanced field length: 900 m (3,000 ft)

== See also ==
Related development

- Antonov An-28

Related lists

- List of airliners
