= Bogorodskoye Airport =

Airport in Bogorodskoye, Khabarovsk Krai, Russia

Bogorodskoye Airport Богородское аэропорт
- IATA: BQG; ICAO: UHNB; LID: БГР

Summary
- Airport type: Public
- Serves: Bogorodskoye
- Location: Bogorodskoye, Khabarovsk Krai
- Elevation AMSL: 148 ft / 45 m
- Coordinates: 52°22′50″N 140°26′55″E

Map
- Location in Khabarovsk Krai

Runways
Direction	Length		Surface
Direction	ft	m	Surface
03/21	3,445	1,050	?
- Source: Ch-aviation, Aviateka.ru

Bogorodskoye Airport (IATA: BQG, ICAO: UHNB) is an airport serving the village of Bogorodskoye, Khabarovsk Krai. Two airlines, Aurora and KhabAvia, fly to the airport seasonally.

== Airlines and destinations ==
As of January 2024, KhabAvia operates twice-weekly flights to Khabarovsk during the fall and winter.

Airlines	Destinations
Aurora	Seasonal: Nogliki
KhabAvia	Khabarovsk

== See also ==
- List of airports in Russia
