= Pyotr Golovin =

Russian military leader

Pyotr Petrovich Golovin

1st Yakut Voivodeship
- In office 1639–1644

Personal details
- Died: 1654
- Children: Ivan, Mikhail, Alexey and Demid Golovin
- Parent: Pyotr Petrovich Menshoy Golovin (father)
- Occupation: Military and statesman

Pyotr Petrovich Golovin (died 1654) was a Russian statesman and military leader, he held the positions of Stolnik (1639) and Okolnichy. He was the first governor of Yakutia, and Viceroy of Kashira. He was the second son of boyar Pyotr Petrovich Menshoy Golovin, and the younger brother of okolnichy and voivode Vasily Petrovich Golovin.

== Yakut Governor ==
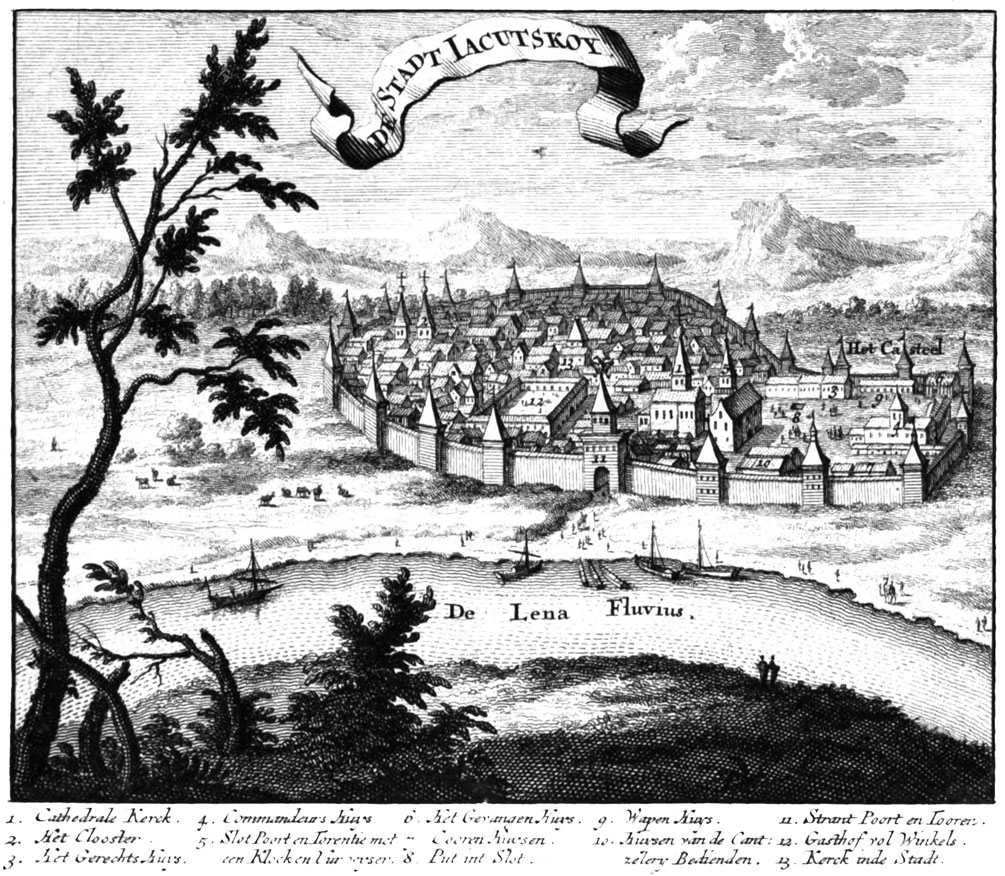
Yakutsk, originally known as Lensky Ostrog (River Lena Fort), in the Seventeenth Century

In 1638 Tsar Mikhail Fyodorovich appointed Pyotr Golovin as the first voivode (governor) in Lensky Ostrog. His assistants were stolnik Matvey Glebov (who would become the second voivode) and clerk Yefim Filatov. They were ordered "to oversee arable and haymaking lands along the Lena River, manage the collection of yasak, build forts, and open new lands." In 1639 the Russians were aware silver deposits in the territory and in November of that year Golovin and Glebov arrived in Yeniseysk, where they stayed until mid‑1640. In July 1641 Golovin and Glebov, with a detachment of 395 Cossacks and 5 priests, reached Lensky Ostrog. Upon taking office, they promised "to administer justice fairly," "to maintain order," and "to restrain thieves from theft." In reality, Golovin was notorious for cruelty toward both natives and Russian settlers.

Also in 1641 Pyotr Golovin, along Matvei Glebov (a fellow governor of what was then the Lena District in Eastern Siberia), provided instructions to the leaders of an expedition to the Yuganda River, one of which was provide a survey of the local people with questions of the people such as "What do they eat? Do they have sables?".

In his first year, Lensky Ostrog was flooded by the Lena River. Golovin sent the clerk‑commander Vassili Poyarkov "to many places" to find a new site for the fortress. Poyarkov found Eyuk Meadow, judged "the best and most suitable." In 1643 the fort was moved to the left bank of the Lena, in the Tuymaada Valley near Lake Saisary. The fort became a town, named Yakutsk.

== Yakut Uprising ==
In February 1642 a major uprising of the Yakuts broke out. It involved the Kangalassy, Namtsy, Boturus, Betun, Borogon, Megin, Amga, and Odey groups. Leaders included Otkuray, Bozek and their brothers, as well as the Kangalassy chief Toyon Eyuk Nikin and Nam chief Mymakh. The cause was Golovin's harsh yasak collection and census. The Yakuts believed he intended to seize all their livestock and possibly destroy them.

The rebels destroyed several small detachments of Russian tax collectors and killed Russian trappers. The uprising spread widely. In March 1642 over 700 Yakuts besieged the fort of Yakut Ostrog on the Lena river, but disagreements among their leaders led them to withdraw. In April–May Golovin, with reinforcements, brutally suppressed the revolt, hanging 23 men after torture, killing the leadership of the local communities, including sons of Tygyn, and burning many Yakut forts with inhabitants.

Golovin quarrelled with his colleagues. His assistants, Glebov and Filatov, opposed his methods. Golovin had them and their families imprisoned, along with many servicemen and trappers. Glebov spent two years in jail. Golovin accused them of treason, claiming they incited Yakuts to raid Yakutsk and plot his murder. The tsar ordered Vasily Pushkin, voivode of Yeniseysk, to investigate. Yakut residents petitioned Pushkin, saying Glebov and Filatov were innocent and that Golovin had tortured people into false accusations.

In 1643 Golovin jailed his close aide, clerk‑commander Enaley Bakhteyarov, who had just returned from an expedition that first reported the Amur, Zeya, Shilka, and the Daurs. News reached Yeniseysk and Moscow, and a royal inquiry proved Bakhteyarov's innocence. In July 1643 Golovin sent 133 Cossacks with artillery under clerk‑commander Vasily Poyarkov to the Amur. He supplied them with tools, sails, firearms, ammunition, copper kettles, cloth, and beads for trade with natives.

In September 1644 Tsar Mikhail appointed Vasily Pushkin and Kirill Suponev as new voivodes in Yakutsk, ordering them "to investigate Golovin's actions." In 1645 Golovin, Glebov, and Filatov were sent under guard to Moscow. After a long inquiry, Glebov and Filatov were acquitted. In 1645 Tsar Mikhail Fyodorovich issued a royal charter (gramota) to the new voevodas of Yakutsk, Vasily Pushkin and Kirill Suponev, ordering them to release Matvey Glebov, clerk (dyak) Yefim Filatov, several priests, and other individuals who had been imprisoned by Pyotr Golovin.

== Later Years ==
In March 1654 Golovin, then part of the Tsar's Privy Council, took part in reviewing the Pereyaslav Agreement in Moscow with Cossack chief Bohdan Khmelnytsky. Golovin helped examine Cossack demands and ensuring the Tsar's demands were properly recorded and sealed and that Cossacks of the Cossack Hetmanate were supported and reassured. In the text it is noted that Golovin was an okolnichy and governor of Kashira. That year he died leaving four sons: Ivan, Mikhail, Alexey and Demid.

== See also ==
- Fyodor Alexeyevich Golovin
- Golovin (surname)
