= Kondyor Massif =

Platinum-rich formation in Khabarovsk Krai, Russia

- Massif
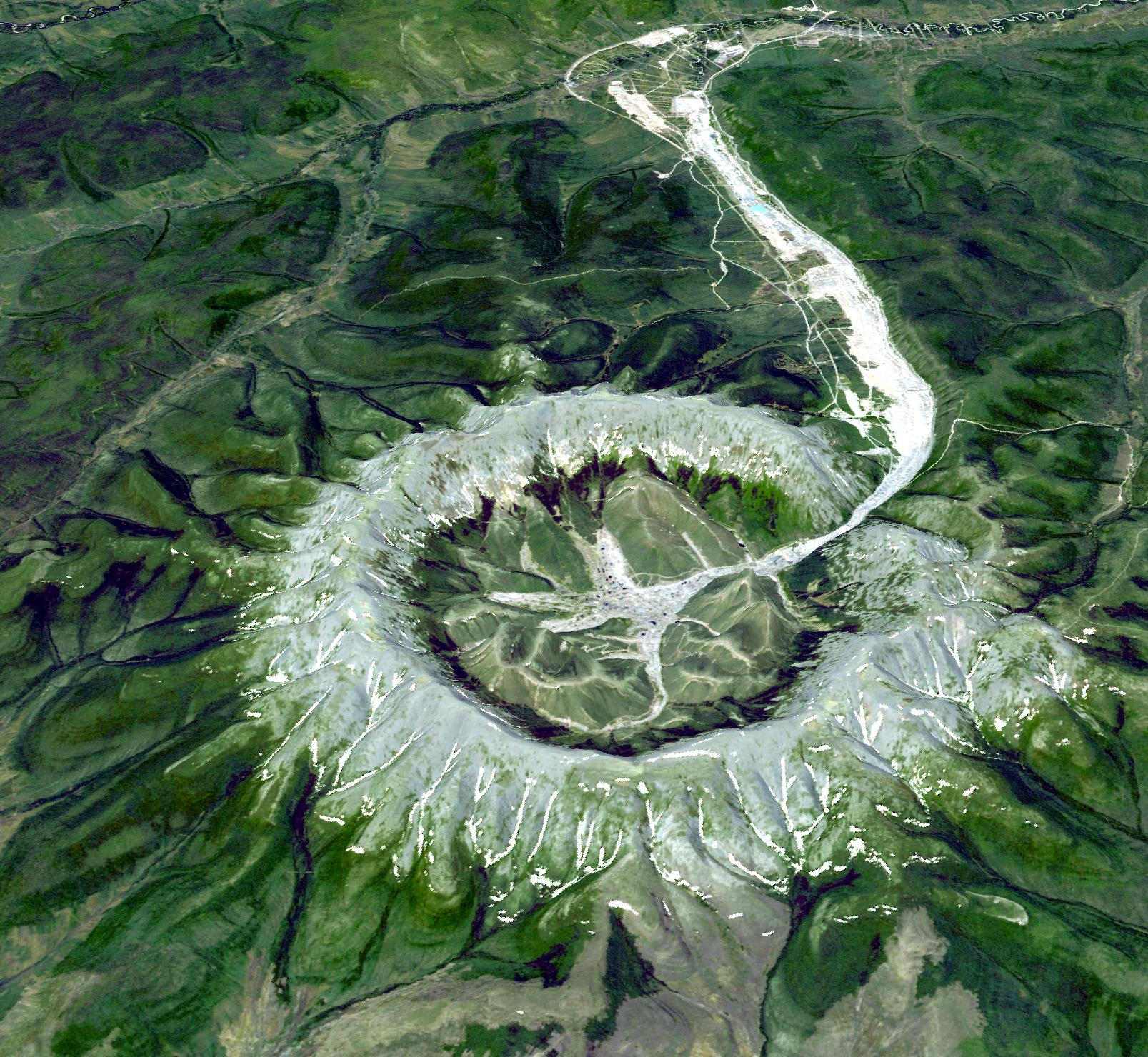
- Simulated 3-D view of the Kondyor Massif, Russia by ASTER

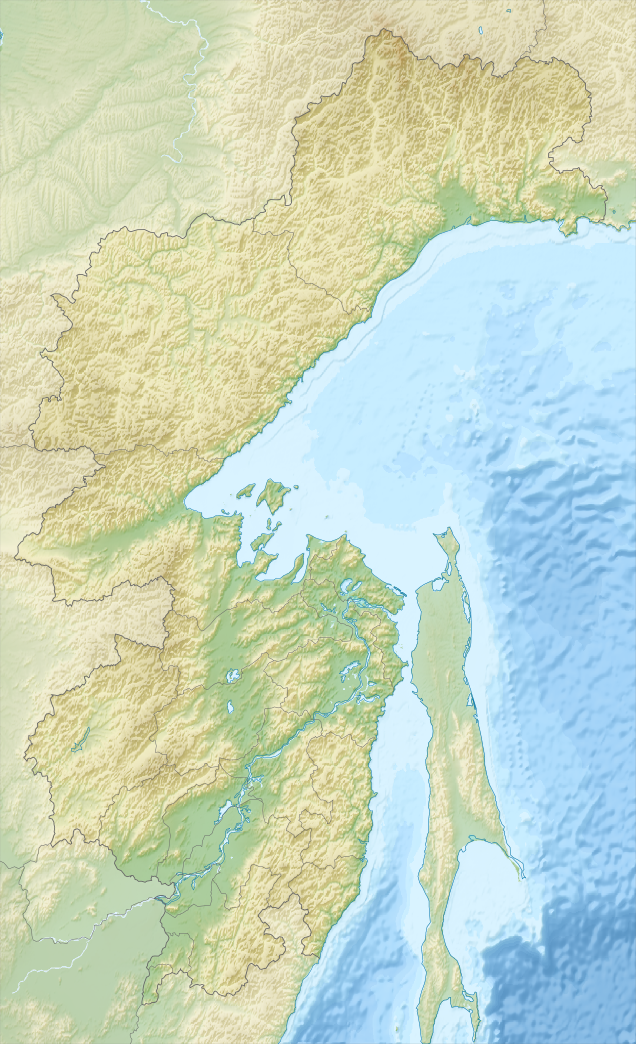
- Location within Khabarovsk Krai
- Coordinates: 57.5863°N 134.6532°E
- Location: Ayano-Maysky District, Khabarovsk Krai, Russia
- Range: Yudoma-Maya Highlands
- Geology: Igneous intrusion and circular ridge

The Kondyor Massif (Russian: горы Кондёр) or Konder is a circular intrusion of igneous rock, about 8 kilometres (5 mi) in diameter. It is located in Khabarovsk Krai, Russia, c. 600 km (373 mi) west-southwest of Okhotsk, or c. 570 km (354 mi) south-east of Yakutsk. It is reached from Yakutsk by road via Amga. It is an important source of platinum.

The Kondyor Massif stands as a textbook example of a ring intrusion, renowned for its remarkable geometric circularity and distinct ridge-and-depression topography. It serves as a global reference site for the study of alkaline-ultramafic magmatism and associated platinum-group element mineralization.

Since 1984, Artel Starateley "Amur" (part of the Russian Platinum group) has developed this alluvial platinum deposit.

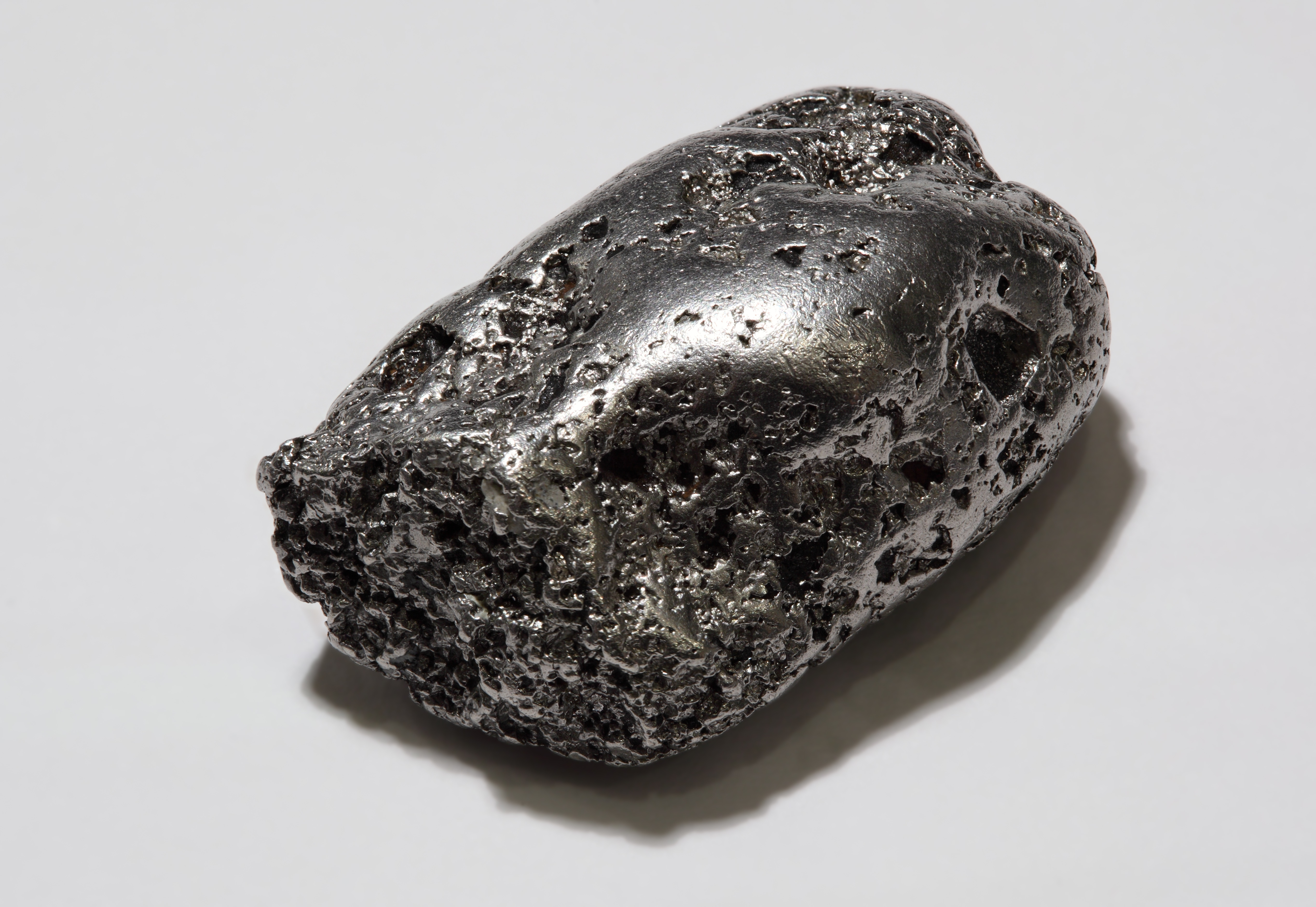
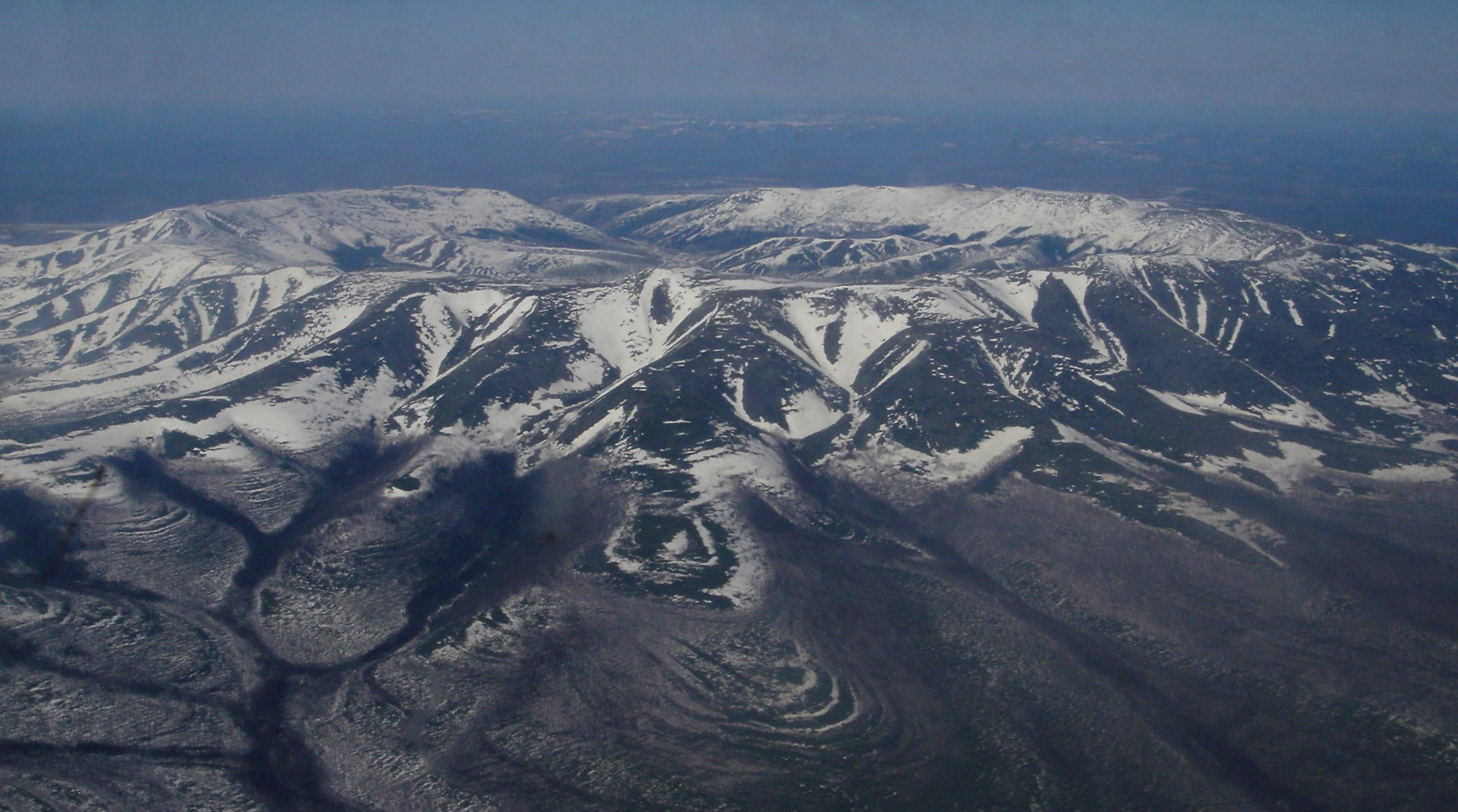
Left - Platinum nugget from the Kondyor Massif. Right - Kondyor Massif viewed from a helicopter

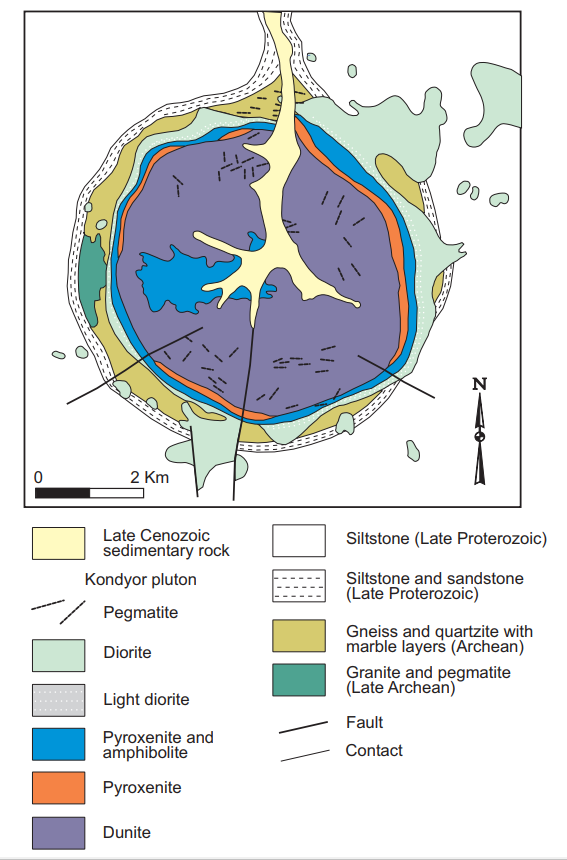
Kondyor geological map

== See also ==
- Ring dike
