= Munuk Airport =

Airport in Russia

Coordinates: 56.4321°N 138.0449°E

- IATA: none; ICAO: UHNA

Summary
- Location: Ayan, Khabarovsk Krai, Russia
- Interactive map of Munuk Airport

Runways
Direction	Length		Surface
Direction	ft	m	Surface
11/29	3,281	1,000	rolled gravel

Munuk Airport (ICAO: UHNA) is a regional airport located in Ayan, Khabarovsk Krai, Russia. Reconstruction of the airport has been included in Russian federal transport plans, with the project covering the runway, taxiways and apron as well as passenger, rescue, fuel, utility and security facilities..

== Airlines and destinations ==
Airlines	Destinations
Vostok Aviation Company	Poliny Osipenko

== See also ==
- List of airports in Russia
