= Mati (Maya) =

River in Khabarovsk Krai, Russia

Mati Мати
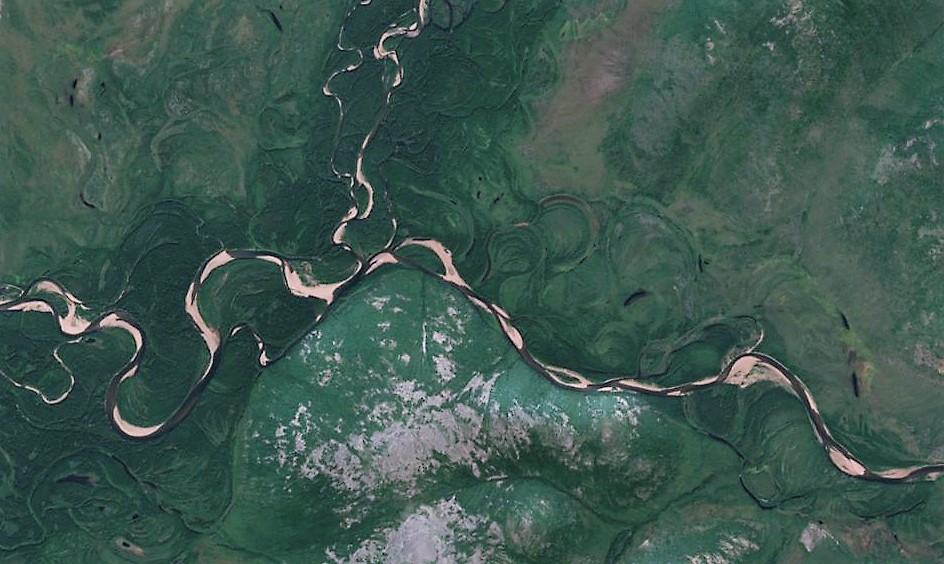
- Confluence of the Mati (right) with the Maya Sentinel-2 image

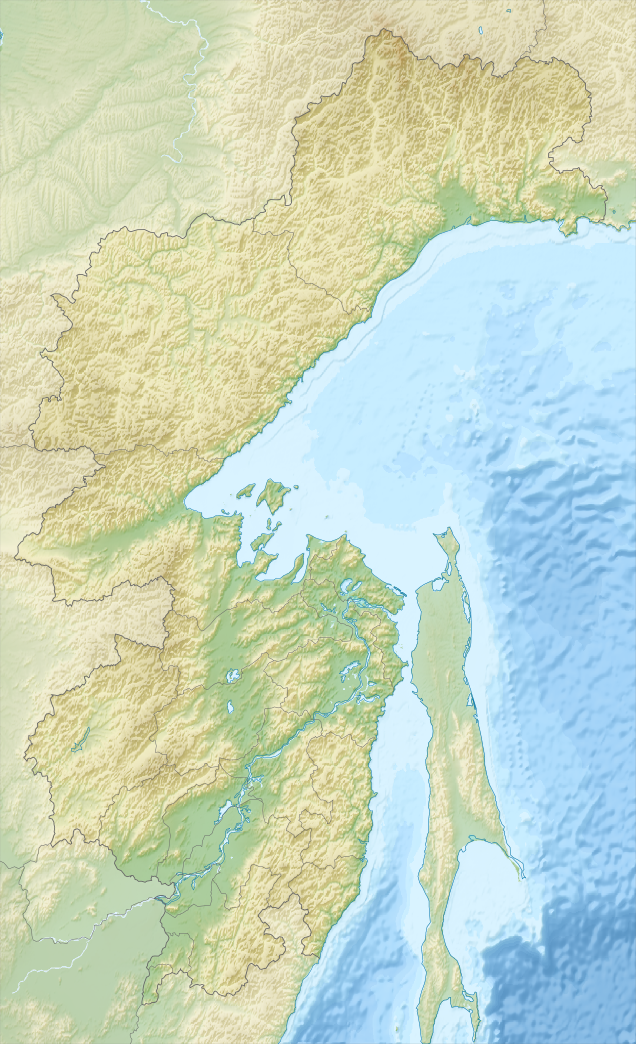
- Mouth location in Khabarovsk Krai, Russia

Location
- Country: Russia

Physical characteristics
- Source: Dzhugdzhur
  - coordinates: 59°00′23″N 140°01′18″E
- Mouth: Maya
  - coordinates: 59°20′02″N 138°45′55″E
- Length: 167 km (104 mi)
- Basin size: 3,530 km^{2} (1,360 sq mi)

Basin features
- Progression: Maya → Aldan→ Lena→ Laptev Sea

The Mati (Russian: Мати) is a river in Okhotsky District, Khabarovsk Krai, Russian Far East. It has a length of 167 km (104 mi) and a drainage basin of 3,530 square kilometres (1,360 mi^{2}). It is a right hand tributary of the Maya.

The Mati flows across uninhabited territory.

== Course ==
The Mati river originates at the confluence of the Levaya Mati and Pravaya Mati mountain rivers in the northern Dzhugdzhur mountain slopes. It heads first roughly westwards and then northwestwards, meandering in the floodplain in its lower course. Finally it flows into the right bank of the Maya 914 km (568 mi) from its mouth in The Aldan. The river is fed by snow and rain. It freezes around late October and stays frozen until mid May.

=== Tributaries ===
The main tributaries of the Mati are the 34 kilometres (21 mi) long Mira and the 29 kilometres (18 mi) long Kostyor from the left, as well as the 50 kilometres (31 mi) long Malinovaya (Machekha), the 44 kilometres (27 mi) long Cheryomukhovaya (Khusharin) and the 35 kilometres (22 mi) long Birandya from the right. There are a few lakes close to the river channel in its last stretch.

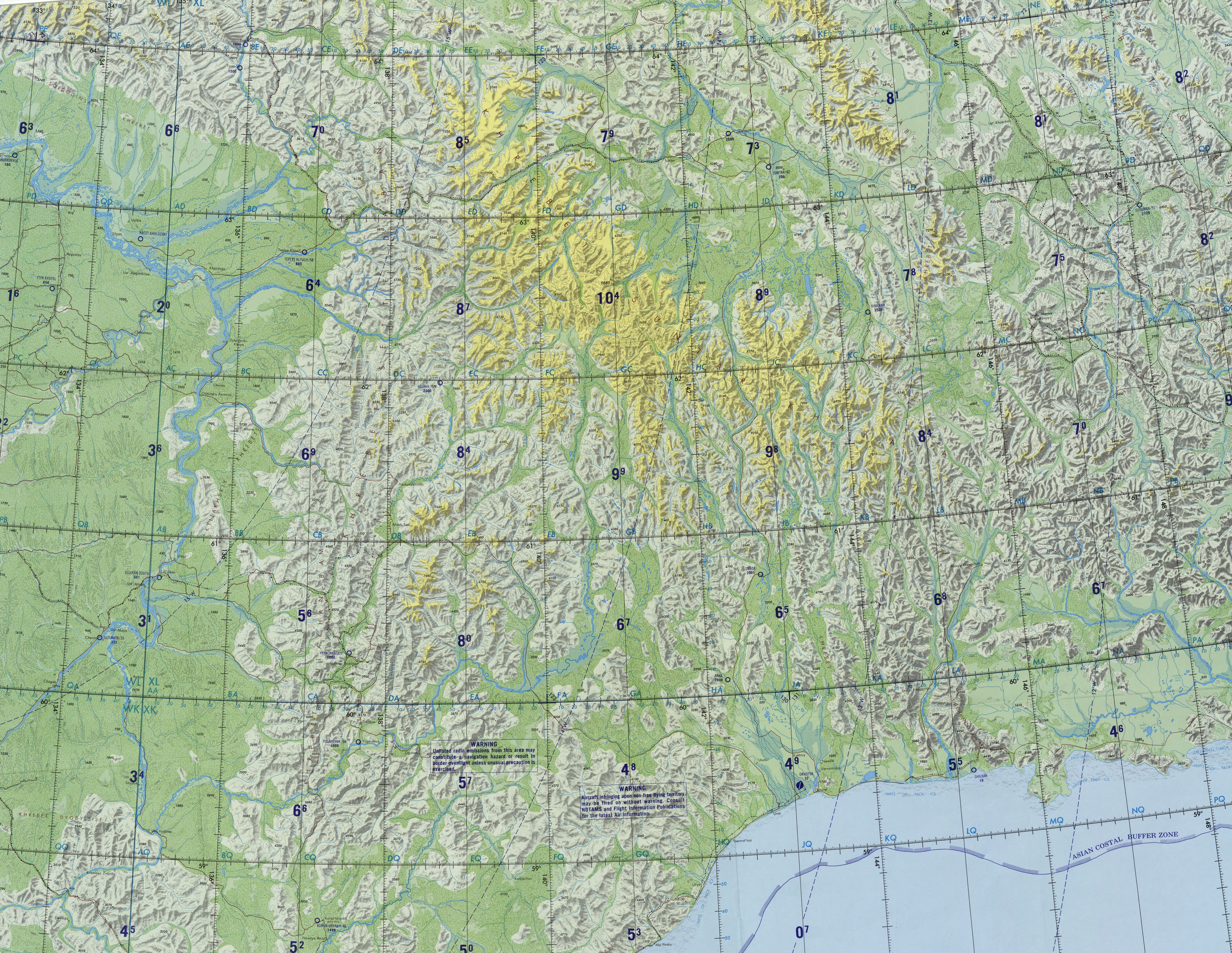
ONC map showing the northern shore of the Sea of Okhotsk.

== See also ==
- List of rivers of Russia
