= Nikolayevsk-on-Amur Airport =

Airport in Khabarovsk Krai, Russia

- IATA: NLI; ICAO: UHNN; LID: НЛК

Summary
- Airport type: Public
- Serves: Nikolayevsk-on-Amur, Khabarovsk Krai, Russia
- Coordinates: 53°09′15″N 140°39′04″E

Maps
- Khabarovsk Krai in Russia

- Location of the airport in the Khabarovsk Krai

Runways
Direction	Length		Surface
Direction	m	ft	Surface
11/29	1,863	6,112	Concrete
- Sources: GCM, STV

Nikolayevsk-on-Amur Airport (Russian: Аэропорт Николаевск-на-Амуре) (IATA: NLI, ICAO: UHNN) is an airport serving the locality of Nikolayevsk-on-Amur, in the Khabarovsk Krai of Russia.

== Airlines and destinations ==
Airlines	Destinations
Khabarovsk Airlines	Khabarovsk

== See also ==
- List of airports in Russia
