= Vostok Aviation Company =

Russian airline

Vostok Aviation Company Авиакомпания "Восток"
IATA	ICAO	Call sign
–	VTK; ЖТК	VOSTOK
- Founded: 15 May 1945
- Commenced operations: 15 May 1945
- Hubs: Khabarovsk Novy Airport
- Fleet size: 23
- Destinations: 8 (scheduled)
- Parent company: UTair Aviation
- Headquarters: Khabarovsk, Russia
- Key people: Aleksandr Kuzymich Tkach (General Director)
- Website: vostockairlines.ru

JSC "Vostok Aviation Company" (Russian: ОАО "Авиакомпания "Восток"), sometimes trading as Vostok Airlines, is a Russian regional airline headquartered in Khabarovsk and a subsidiary of UTair Aviation. It operates domestic scheduled and charter passenger services, freight services, air ambulance, air patrol, firefighting, oil rig support as well as other specialized operations. Its main base is Khabarovsk Novy Airport. It is banned from flying in the European Union airspace.

== History ==
Vostok Aviation Company was established and started operations as 264 Squadron of the Far Eastern division of Aeroflot on 15 May 1945. It was incorporated as a joint stock company on 30 June 1993. The airline is owned by Khabarovsk regional administration (51%) and the airline employees (49%).

== Fleet ==
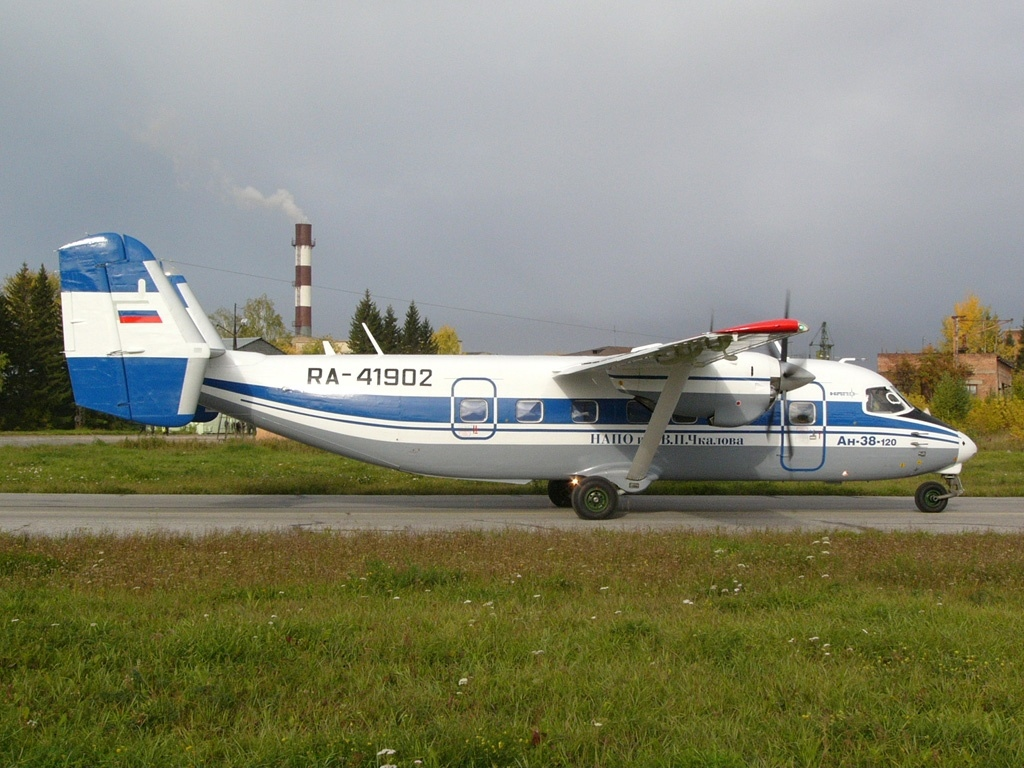
Vostok Airlines Antonov An-38

As of December 2015, the Vostok Aviation Company fleet includes the following aircraft:

- 5 Antonov An-28
- 3 Antonov An-38
- 6 Mil Mi-8T
- 9 Mil Mi-8MTV-1

== Accidents ==
- Vostok Aviation Company Flight 359, an Antonov An-28 crashed into a slope on approach to Ayan. All 16 people on board died.
