= Maya (Aldan) =

Maya Мая / Маайа
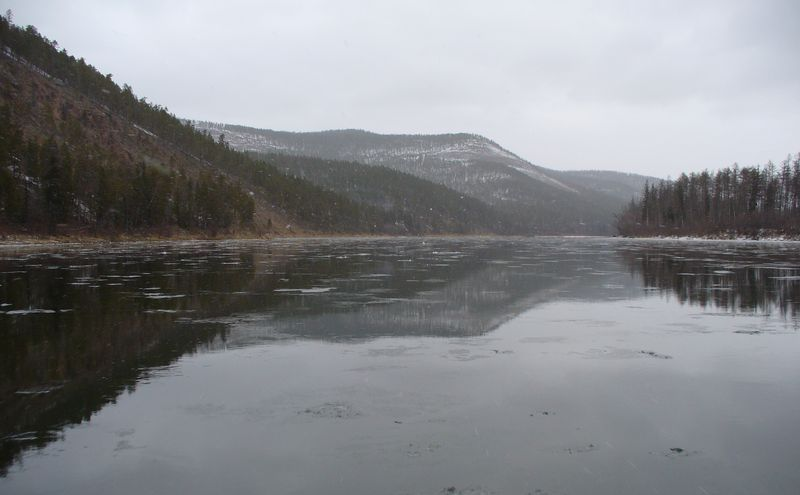
- The Maya in October

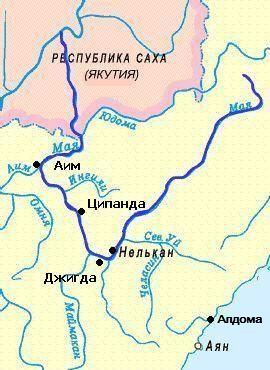
- The Maya is the V-shaped tributary of the Aldan

Location
- Country: Russia

Physical characteristics
- Source
  - location: Dzhugdzhur
  - coordinates: 59°44′50″N 139°38′02″E
- Mouth: Aldan
  - coordinates: 60°24′22″N 134°33′06″E
- Length: 1,087 km (675 mi)
- Basin size: 171,000 km^{2} (66,000 sq mi)
- Discharge
  - average: 1,180 m^{3}/s (42,000 cu ft/s)

Basin features
- Progression: Aldan→ Lena→ Laptev Sea

The Maya (Russian: Мая; Yakut: Маайа, Maaya) is a river in Khabarovsk Krai and Sakha, Russia. It is a right tributary of the Aldan of the Lena basin. The length of the river is 1,053 kilometres (654 mi). The area of its basin 171,000 square kilometres (66,000 mi^{2}).

The Maya was part of the river route from Yakutsk to the Okhotsk Coast. From the Mati either the Lama Portage or the Alanchak Portage led to the Ulya and the coast. Near the southernmost point was the settlement of Nelkan from which a track led over the mountains to Ayan. From Ust-Maya there was a horse-track to Yakutsk. Eastbound boats that reached Ust-Maya from the Lena were replaced by smaller boats to continue up the Maya.

== Course ==
Its course is approximately V-shaped. The upper Maya runs about 201 kilometres (125 mi) southwest parallel to the coast between the Dzhugdzhur mountains and the Yudoma Plateau. About 80 kilometres (50 mi) from its source the 167 km (104 mi) long Mati river joins its right bank from the south. The Maya flows west for perhaps 64 kilometres (40 mi) and receives the Maimakan River from the southwest. From here the river flows basically north about 320 kilometres (200 mi), receives the Yudoma from the east and joins the Aldan at Ust-Maya.

The Maya freezes up in late October and stays under the ice until May. The river is navigable up to 500 kilometres (310 mi) upstream from its mouth. The Yudoma-Maya Highlands are located in the basin of the Maya.

=== Tributaries ===
The 765 km (475 mi) long Yudoma from the right is one of the biggest tributaries of the Maya. Other important tributaries are the 421 km (262 mi) long Maymakan, the 246 km (153 mi) long Batomga and the 233 km (145 mi) long Severny Uy from the left, as well as the 171 km (106 mi) long Ingili from the right.

== See also ==
- List of rivers of Russia
- Yudoma-Maya Highlands
