= Dzhugdzhur =

Mountain range in eastern Siberia, Russia

Coordinates: 58°N 136°E

- Джугджу́р
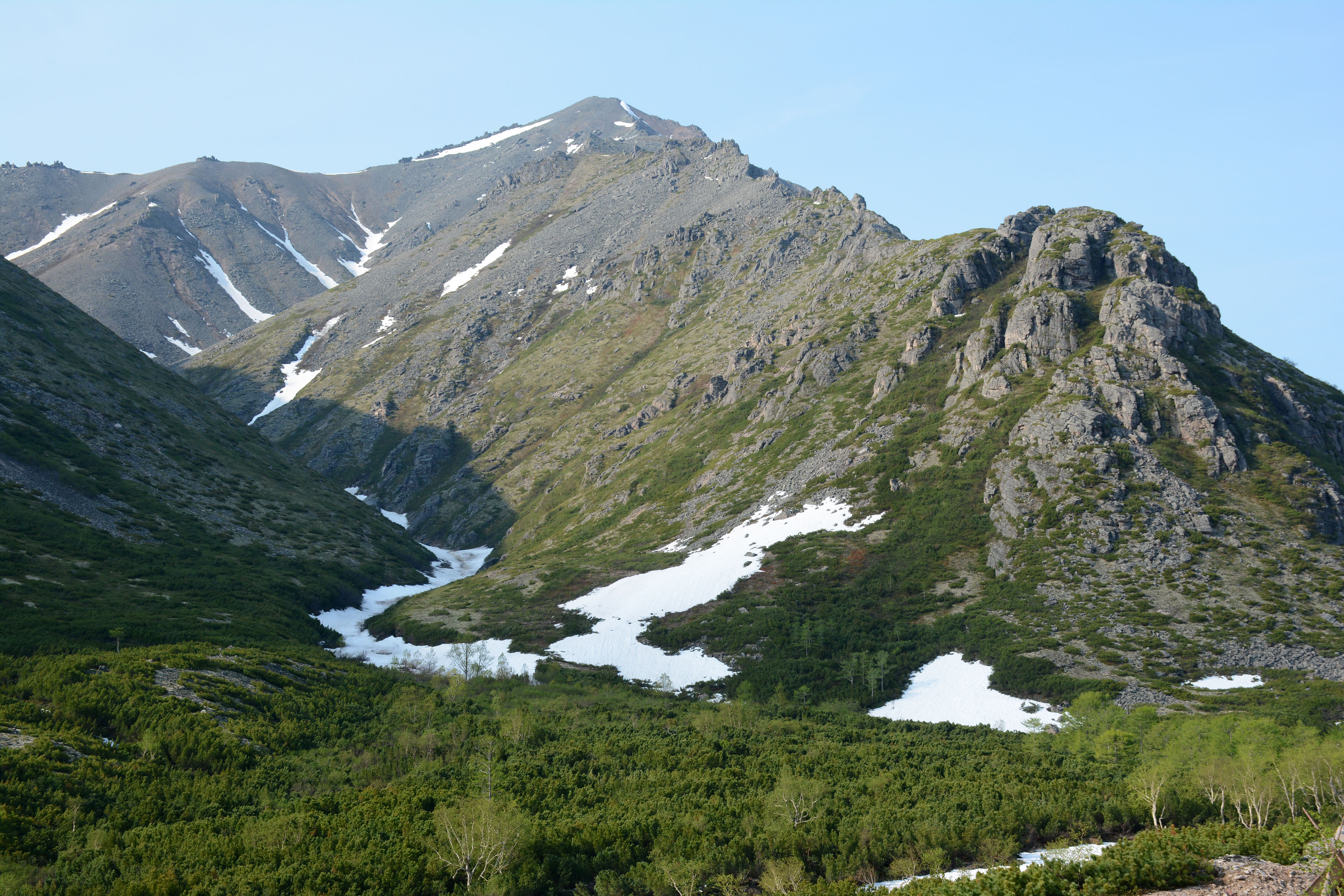

Highest point
- Peak: Topko
- Elevation: 1,906 m (6,253 ft)

Dimensions
- Length: 700 km (430 mi)
- Width: 175–200 km (109–124 mi)

Naming
- Native name: Дюгдюр (Evenki)

Geography
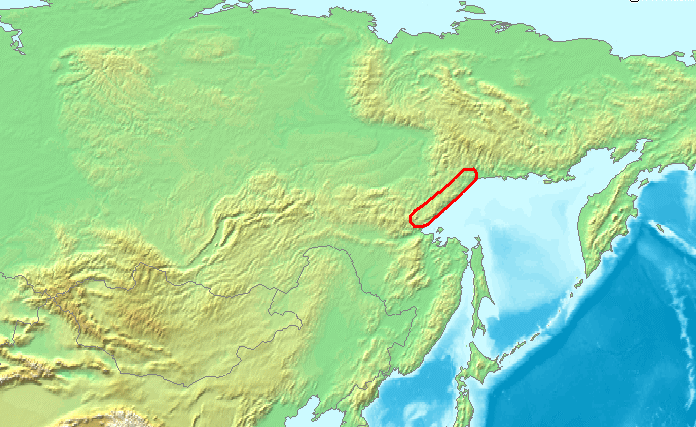
- Location of the Dzhugdzhur mountain range
- Country: Russia
- State: Khabarovsk Krai
- Parent range: East Siberian Mountains

The Dzhugdzhur (Russian: Джугджу́р) or Jugjur (Evenki: Дюгдюр), meaning "big bulge" in Evenki, are a mountain range along the western shores of the Sea of Okhotsk, located in Khabarovsk Krai in the far east of Siberia.

The mountains are quite deserted, the one exception being the gold mines that have operated in the range since the 1920s.

== Geography ==
The east range is bound by the northwest coast of the Sea of Okhotsk. To the northwest the range limits with the Yudoma-Maya Highlands, to the southwest with the Stanovoy Range, to the south with the Dzhagdy Range, and to the northeast with the Kolyma Mountains. The Maya, the Maymakan, and the Mati are among the rivers having their source in the range.

== Geology ==
The range was formed by an asymmetrical fold. The southwestern half of the mountains is composed of gneiss and granite from the Precambrian, while the northeast contains Mesozoic shale and limestone as well as Cretaceous and Paleocene igneous rock.

== Ecology and climate ==
The coastal stretch of the range is populated by Japanese stone pine and Dahurian larch. Parts of the range occupied by the Okhotsk-Manchurian taiga ecoregion contain swathes of Jezo spruce up to elevations of 1,300 m.

The climate is wet and cold, with wet rainy summers and severe winters.
