= Alrosa Flight 514 =

2010 aviation accident in Russia

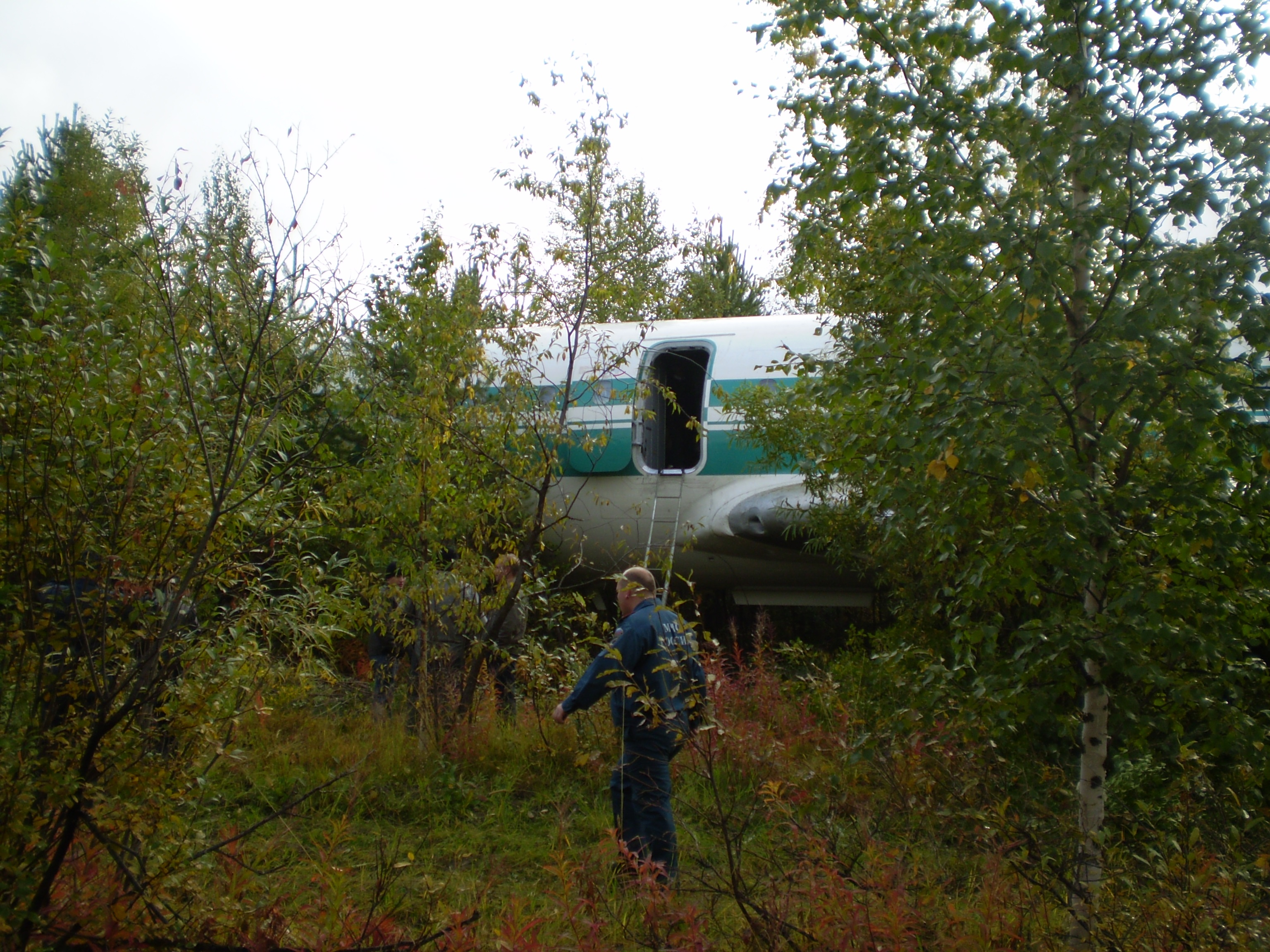
- The aircraft hidden behind trees

Accident
- Date: 7 September 2010
- Summary: Emergency landing and runway overrun following total loss of electrical power
- Site: Izhma Airport, Russia; 65°01′54″N 53°58′12″E

Aircraft
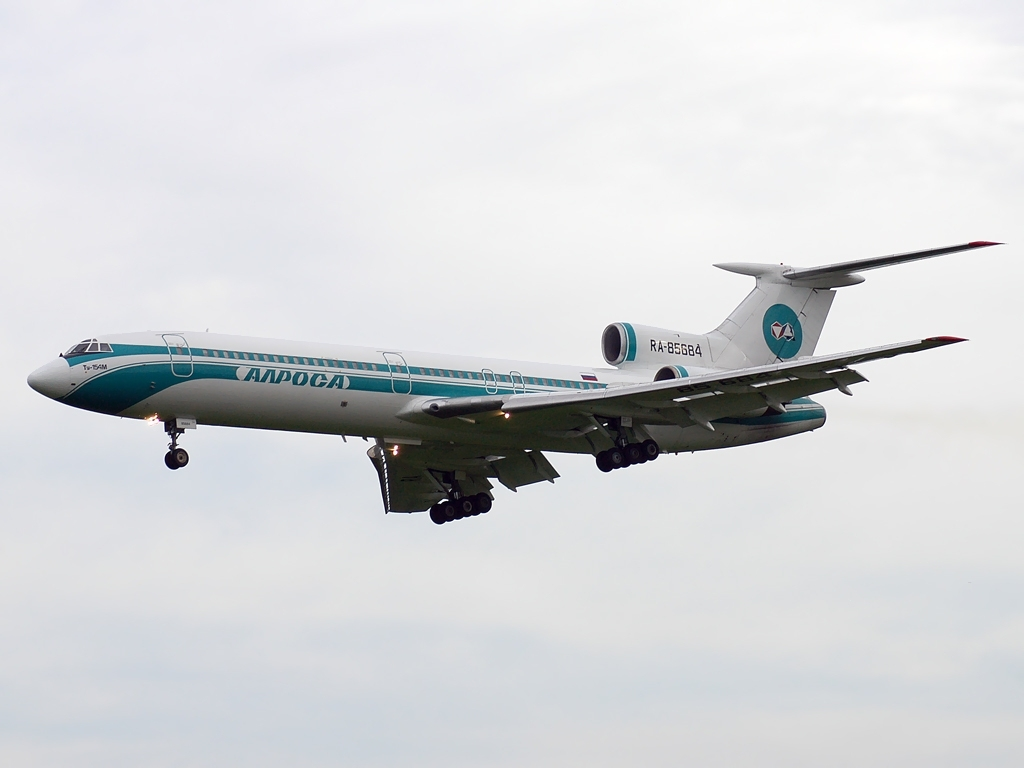
- RA-85684, the aircraft involved in the accident, seen in 2009
- Aircraft type: Tupolev Tu-154M
- Operator: Alrosa
- Call sign: MIRNY 514
- Registration: RA-85684
- Flight origin: Polyarny Airport, Udachny, Russia
- Destination: Domodedovo International Airport, Moscow, Russia
- Occupants: 81
- Passengers: 72
- Crew: 9
- Fatalities: 0
- Survivors: 81

Alrosa Flight 514 was a Tupolev Tu-154 passenger jet on a domestic scheduled flight from Udachny to Moscow, Russia, that on 7 September 2010 made a successful emergency landing at a remote airstrip after suffering an in-flight total electrical failure. All 81 people on board escaped unharmed.

The Tupolev was en route at cruise altitude when the failure occurred, which disabled the fuel system and all navigational and radio equipment, meaning that the aircraft would not have been able to reach its destination. The crew decided to attempt an emergency landing at the disused Izhma Airport. The aircraft overran the end of the runway and came to rest among the vegetation, damaged but still on its landing gear.

The crew of Flight 514 were subsequently decorated for their actions, and the aircraft was successfully repaired and flown out of the airfield to resume service with Alrosa.

== Accident ==
Flight 514 was over Usinsk, at an altitude of 10,600 metres (34,800 ft) (FL 348) when the first signs of a problem were noticed at about 06:59 local time (02:59 UTC). Shortly after, the aircraft suffered a complete failure of the electrical system, which resulted in the loss of navigational systems and electric fuel pumps. The loss of the pumps prevented the transfer of fuel from the wing tanks to the engine supply tank in the fuselage, leaving the aircraft with only 3,300 kilograms (7,300 lb) of usable fuel, enough for 30 minutes of flight.

At about 07:47, the emergency authorities at Izhma were informed that the aircraft could make an emergency landing at the local airport. Izhma Airport is a former airfield that is now used only for helicopters, and the 1,325-metre-long (4,347 ft) runway is closed but not abandoned. The airfield, having closed to fixed-wing aircraft in 2003, was no longer marked on aeronautical charts.

The passengers were moved to the front of the aircraft. The electrical failure also caused a loss of the radio system, flaps and slats. Two attempts to land were aborted. On the third attempt, a successful emergency landing was made at 07:55 local time. The aircraft overran the runway by 160 metres (520 ft), and sustained some damage in the process. The aircraft landed at a speed of 350 to 380 kilometres per hour (190 to 210 kn; 220 to 240 mph), faster than normal, due to the lack of flaps. Although the flaps are powered by hydraulics, the switches operating them are electrical. All nine crew and 72 passengers evacuated using the aircraft's evacuation slides. No injuries were reported.

== Aircraft ==
The aircraft operating the flight was a tri-jet Tupolev Tu-154M with registration RA-85684 and serial number 90A-851. It was built in 1990.

== Aftermath ==
After evacuating the aircraft and while awaiting rescue, some of the passengers searched for mushrooms, a popular pastime in Russia. A sports complex at Izhma was used as temporary accommodations for the unexpected visitors, due to a lack of hotel space locally. They were later flown by Mil Mi-8 helicopter to Ukhta Airport, where a replacement Tupolev Tu-154 flew them on to Moscow. Two passengers decided to continue their journey by rail instead. The passengers of Flight 514 called for the flight crew to be honoured for their actions. The crew remained in Ukhta to assist authorities with their investigation into the accident. The successful emergency landing was hailed as a miracle by Russian aviation experts. Russian Transport Minister Igor Levitin met the crew and thanked them for their "heroic, decisive and professional actions" in the accident. He also paid tribute to their courage.

=== Awards ===
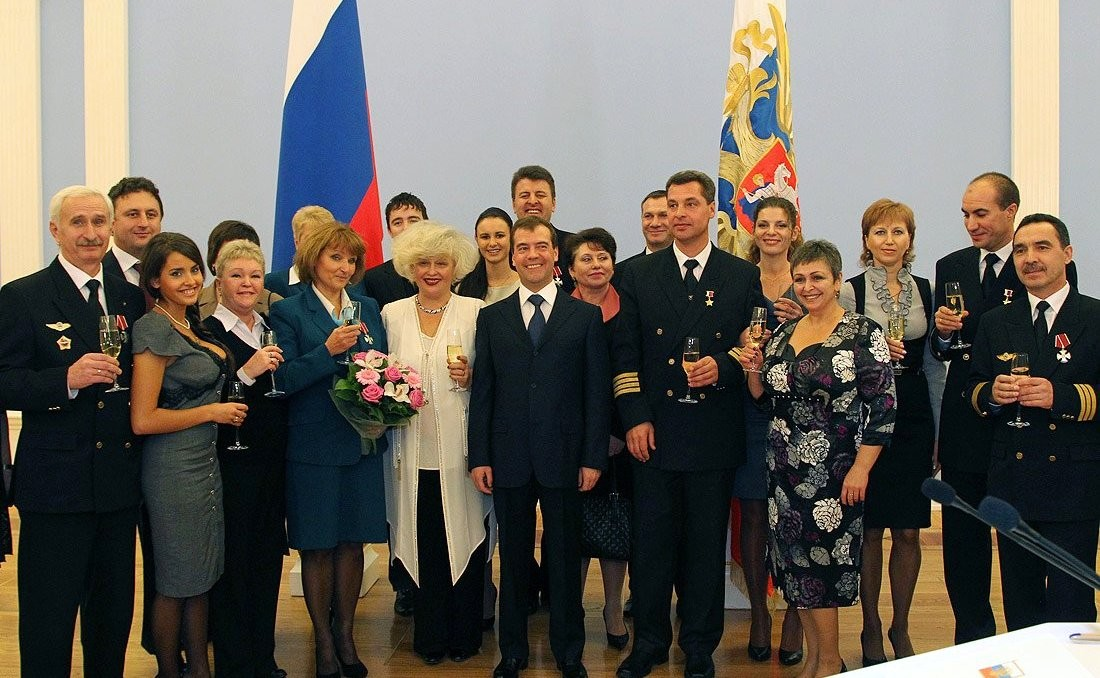
Russian president Dmitry Medvedev (center) receiving the crew of Flight 514 at the Kremlin on 16 November 2010

The pilots of Flight 514, Captain Yevgeny Novoselov and First Officer Andrei Lamanov, were made Heroes of the Russian Federation. The other seven crew members were awarded the Order of Courage. The order awarding the decorations was signed by Russian president Dmitry Medvedev.

The landing could only be successful because the airport superior, Sergey Sotnikov, even after the airport was closed to traffic in 2003, was keeping the landing strip free of trees and bushes. Sotnikov was later decorated by the president of Russia.

== Investigation ==
Russian authorities launched an investigation into the accident. A preliminary report was expected to be published after 10 days. On 14 September 2010, the report indicated that the batteries had self-overheated, suffering a thermal runaway. This affected the entire electrical system, navigation system and radio system.

== Return to service ==
The aircraft suffered considerable damage during the runway excursion, but after an assessment by aircraft manufacturer Tupolev, Alrosa decided that it could be repaired and returned to service. After having two of its three engines replaced, the Tu-154 was stripped of all unnecessary weight and loaded with the minimal necessary amount of fuel. Test pilots from the Russian State Scientific Research Institute of Civil Aviation (GosNII GA) were selected to fly the jet out of the airfield.

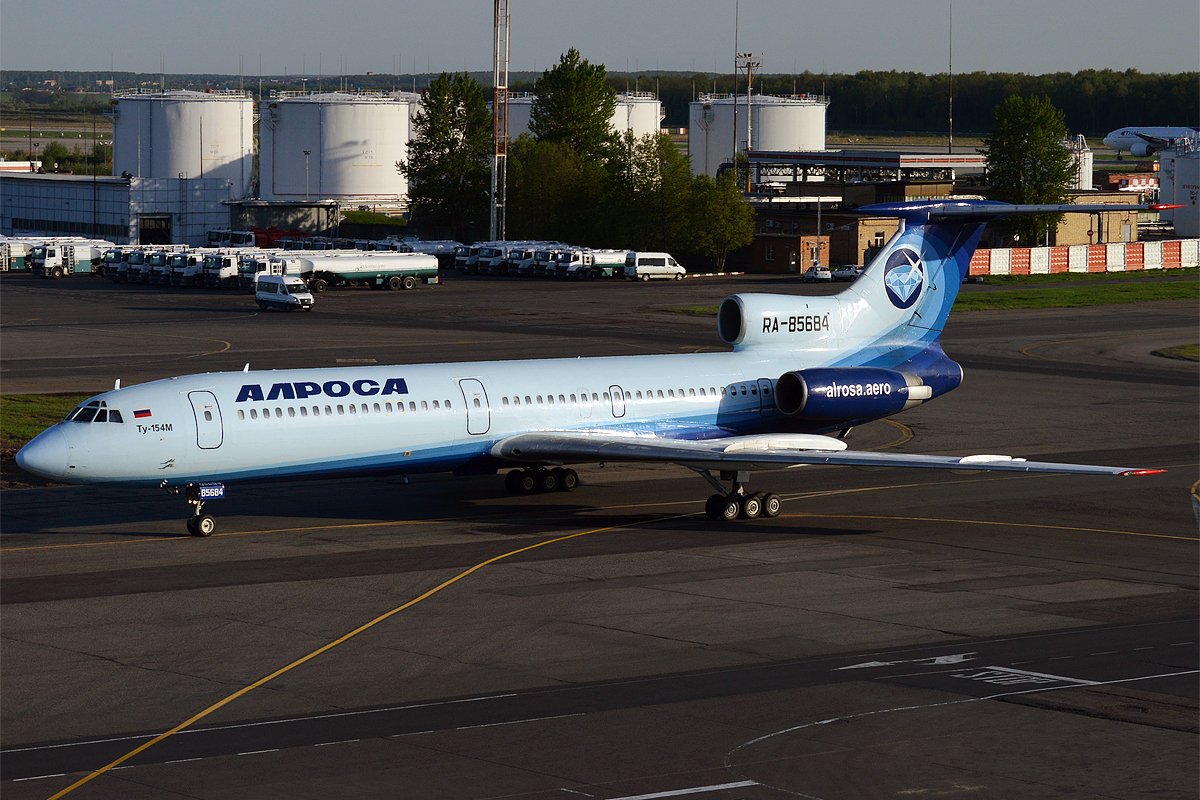
RA-85684 in May 2018, four months before its retirement

On 24 March 2011, six months after the incident, the jet successfully took off from Izhma to fly 160 kilometres (100 mi) to Ukhta Airport for refuelling and inspection, and then on to Samara Airport for further repairs. Despite the Tu-154 normally requiring around 2,500 metres (8,200 ft) of runway to take-off, the RA-85684 managed to lift off after only 800 metres (2,600 ft), well within Izhma's 1,300-metre (4,300 ft) runway.

Repair work was completed in June 2011, after which RA-85684, having been given the name Izhma, resumed regular service with Alrosa. It remained in service until September 2018, when its certificate of airworthiness expired and the airline considered its renewal uneconomical.

On 29 September 2018, Izhma was flown for the last time from Mirny Airport, Alrosa's base, to Novosibirsk Tolmachevo Airport in Siberia, to become part of the collection of the local aviation museum. Lamanov, the first officer on the accident flight, was at the controls as pilot in command, and was met on arrival on the ground by captain Novoselov.

== See also ==
- List of Heroes of the Russian Federation
