= Alrosa (airline) =

Russian airline

ALROSA

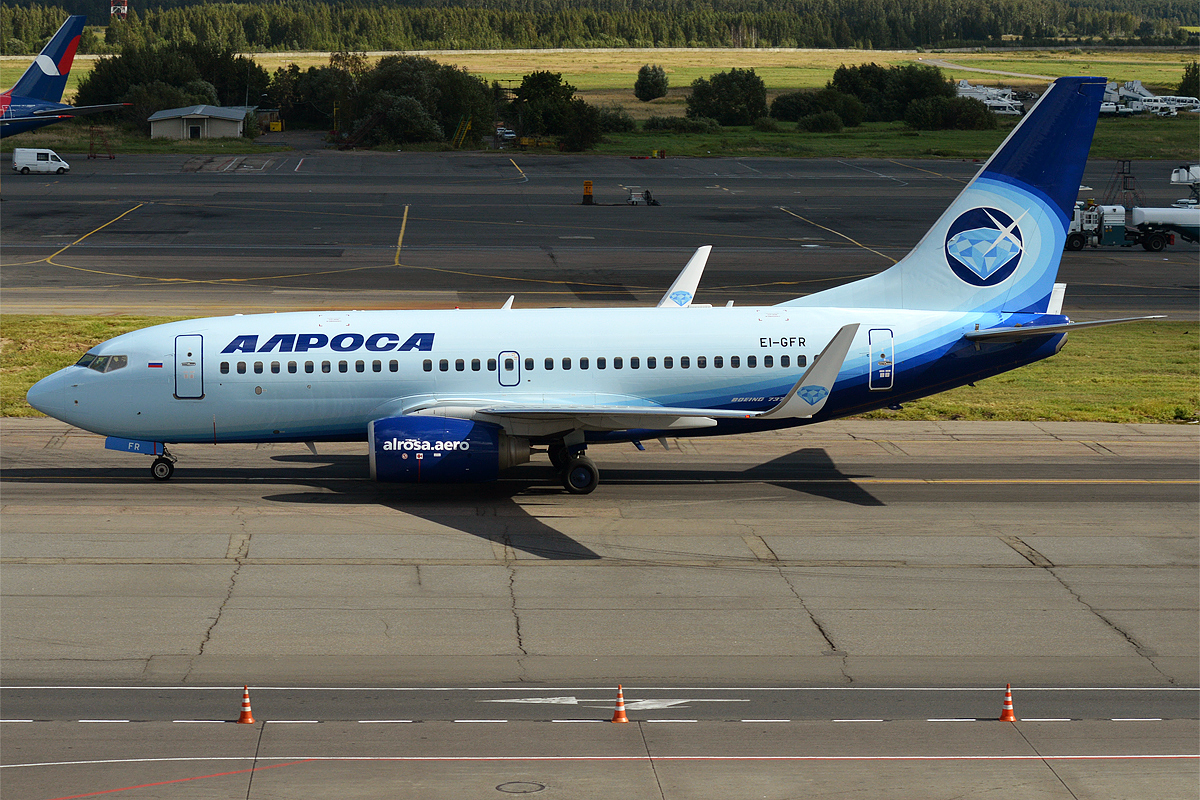
- Alrosa Boeing 737-700
IATA	ICAO	Call sign
6R	DRU	MIRNY
- Founded: 2000; 26 years ago
- Hubs: Mirny Airport; Polyarny Airport
- Fleet size: 7
- Destinations: 11
- Parent company: ALROSA
- Headquarters: Mirny, Russia
- Website: alrosa.aero

CJSC "Air Company ALROSA" (Russian: ЗАО «Авиакомпания АЛРОСА», ZAO «Aviakompanija ALROSA»; Yakut: Алроса авиахампанньа, Alrosa aviaxampannya), formerly Alrosa Mirny Air Enterprise (Alrosa Air Company Limited) is an airline from Mirny, Russia. Its bases are at Mirny Airport and Polyarny Airport, with a focus city at Lensk Airport. The airline operates scheduled and chartered domestic flights.

It is currently banned from flying in the EU like all other Russian airlines.

== History ==
Alrosa Mirny Air Enterprise was founded by the Russian mining company ALROSA (Almazy Rossii Sakha). A sister company, Alrosa Avia, which was established in 1992 and operated passenger charter services in Russia and the CIS out of Moscow Vnukovo Airport. The company's flight certificate was annulled on 21 November 2008. On 29 September 2018, RA-85684, the aircraft involved in Alrosa Flight 514 completed its last flight from Mirny to Novosibirsk. The aircraft was installed as a monument at the Tolmachevo Museum of Aviation.

On 29 October 2020, ALROSA airline operated the last civil Tu-154 flight in Russia. The Tu-154, tail number RA-85757, flew from Mirny to Novosibirsk carrying 140 passengers.

== Destinations ==
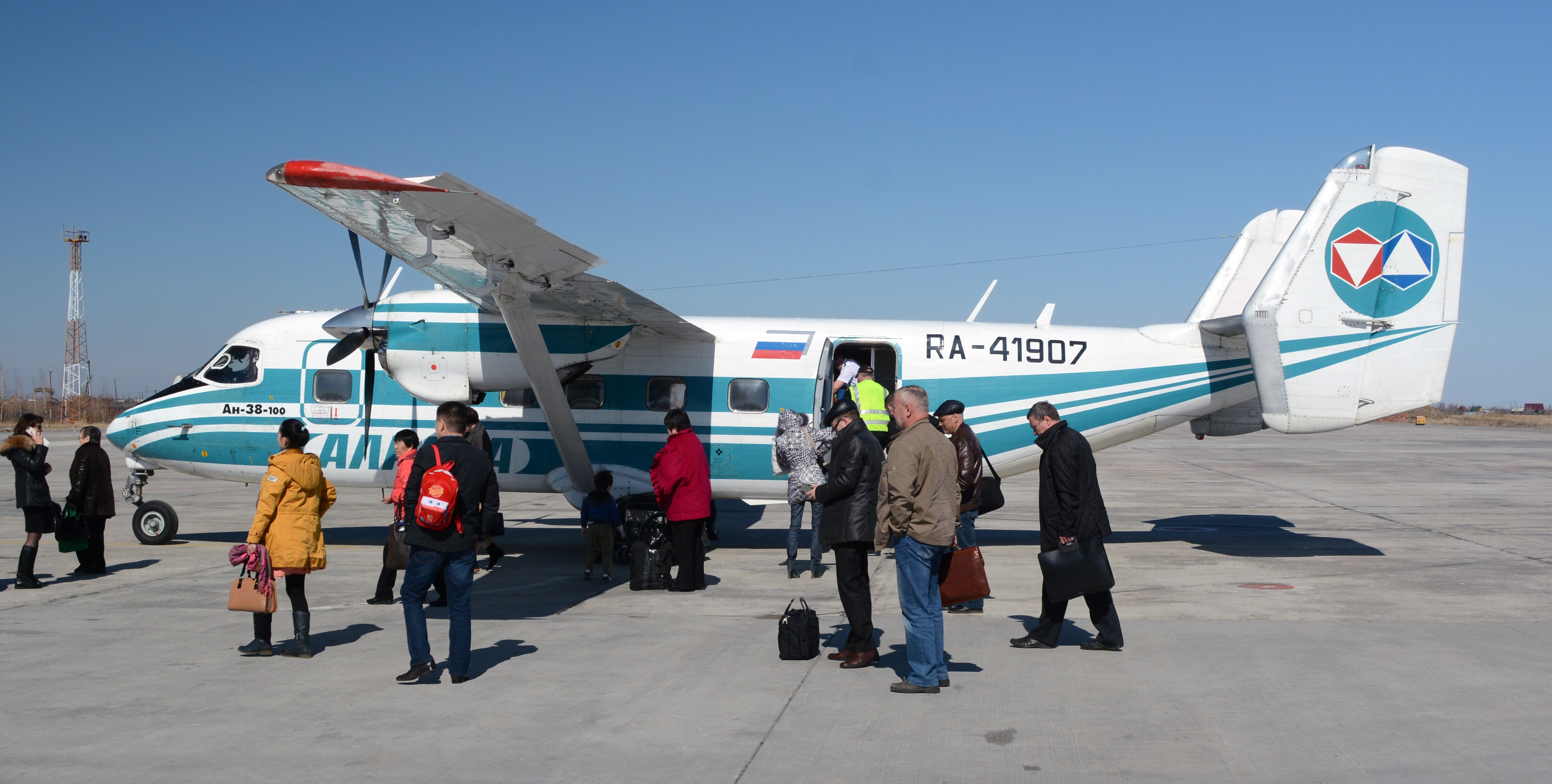
Alrosa An-38 wearing an old livery

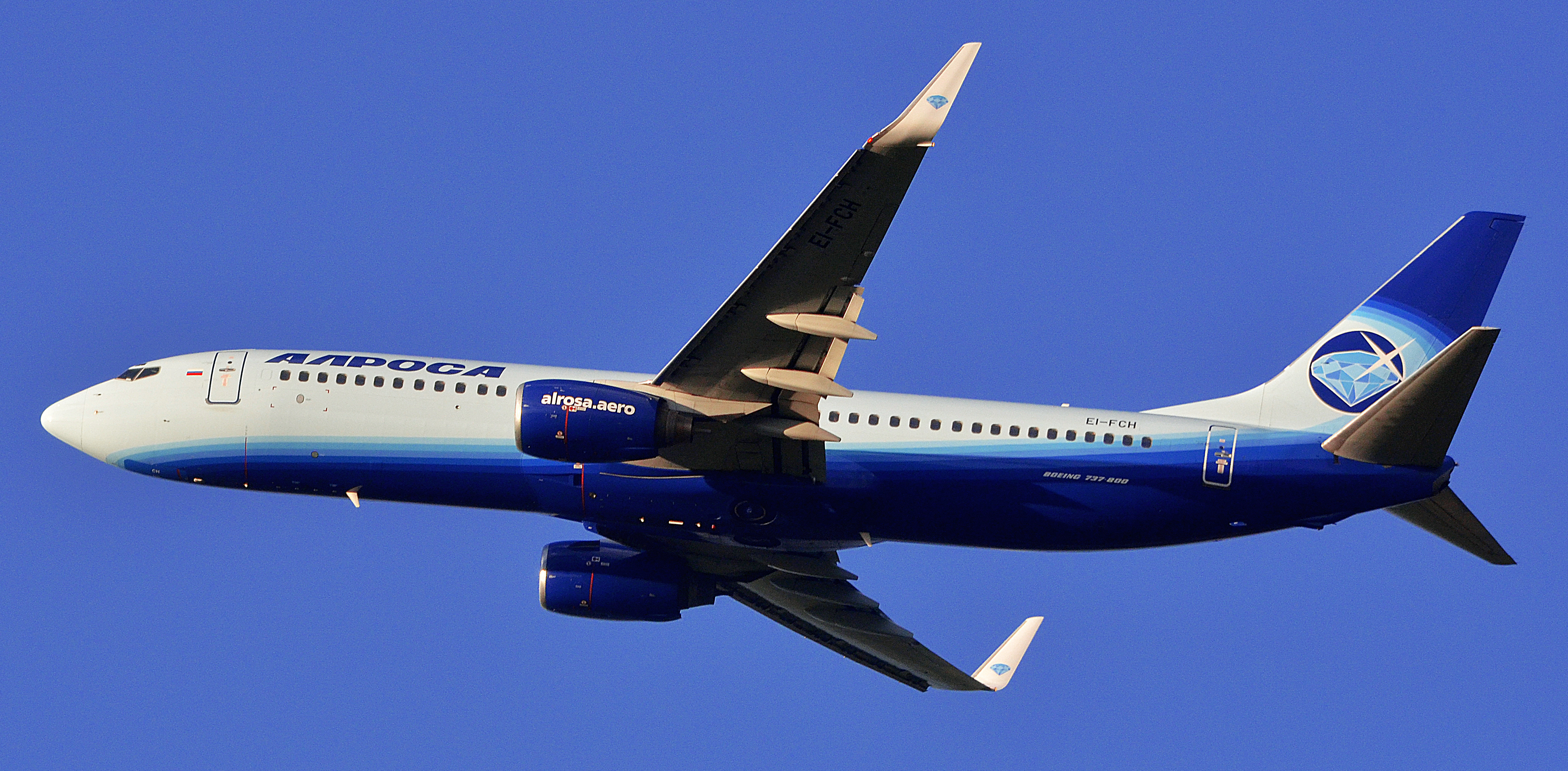
Alrosa Boeing 737-800

Alrosa Mirny Air Enterprise serves the following destinations within Russia (as of December 2015):

Russia
Irkutsk Oblast

- Irkutsk – International Airport Irkutsk

Krasnodar Krai

- Krasnodar – Pashkovsky Airport terminated

Krasnoyarsk Krai

- Krasnoyarsk – Yemelyanovo Airport

Leningrad Oblast / Saint Petersburg

- Pulkovo International Airport

Moscow / Moscow Oblast

- Moscow Domodedovo Airport
- Vnukovo International Airport

Novosibirsk Oblast

- Novosibirsk – Tolmachevo Airport

Orenburg Oblast

- Orenburg – Orenburg Tsentralny Airport

Sakha

- Lensk – Lensk Airport focus city
- Mirny – Mirny Airport base
- Udachny – Polyarny Airport base
- Yakutsk – Yakutsk Airport

Sverdlovsk Oblast

- Yekaterinburg – Koltsovo Airport

Tomsk Oblast

- Tomsk – Bogashevo Airport

Russia/Ukraine (disputed territory of Crimea)
Crimea

- Simferopol International Airport (suspended)

== Fleet ==
As of September 2024, the ALROSA fleet – excluding helicopters – includes the following aircraft:

Alrosa fleet
Aircraft	In service	Orders	Passengers			Notes
Aircraft	In service	Orders	J	Y	Total	Notes
Antonov An-24RV	1	—	—	48	48	
Antonov An-38	1	—	—	26	26	
Boeing 737-700	2	—	—	136	136	As of August 2025.
Boeing 737-800	3	—	12	144	166	As of August 2025.
Sukhoi Superjet 100	—	2	TBA			Letter of intent signed in 2018.
Yakovlev MC-21-300	—	3	TBA			Deliveries planned to begin in 2023.
Total	7	5				

== Accidents and incidents ==
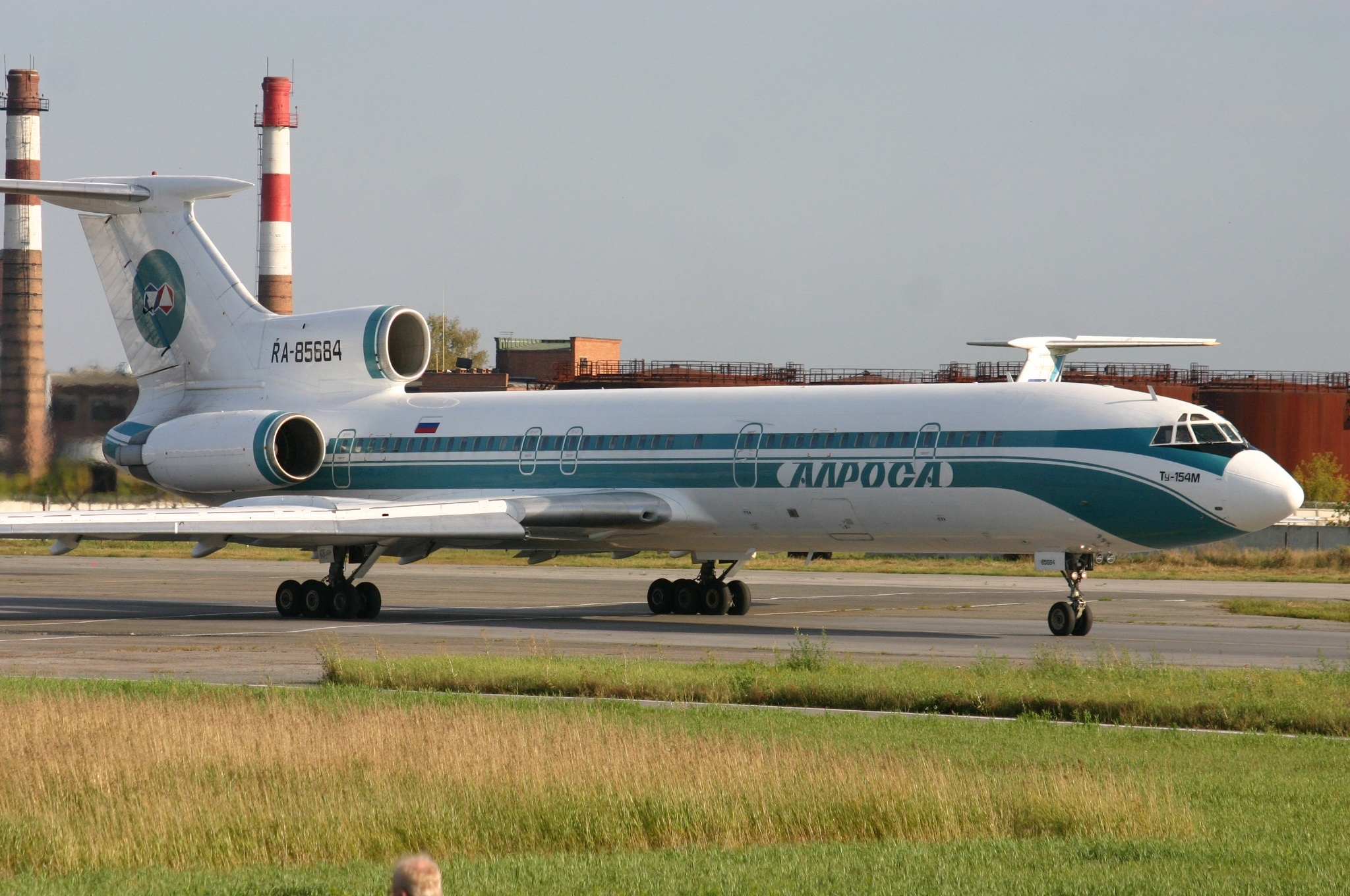
RA-85684, the Tupolev Tu-154M involved in the 2010 incident of Alrosa Flight 514

- 7 September 2010: Alrosa Flight 514, operated by a Tupolev Tu-154M (RA-85684), suffered a complete in-flight electrical failure while on a scheduled domestic flight from Udachny to Moscow. A successful emergency landing was made at the disused Izhma Airport but the aircraft overran the runway and was damaged. All 81 people on board escaped uninjured. The aircraft was later repaired and returned to service.
