= 2016 Russian Ministry of Emergency Situations Il-76 crash =

Aviation incident in Russia

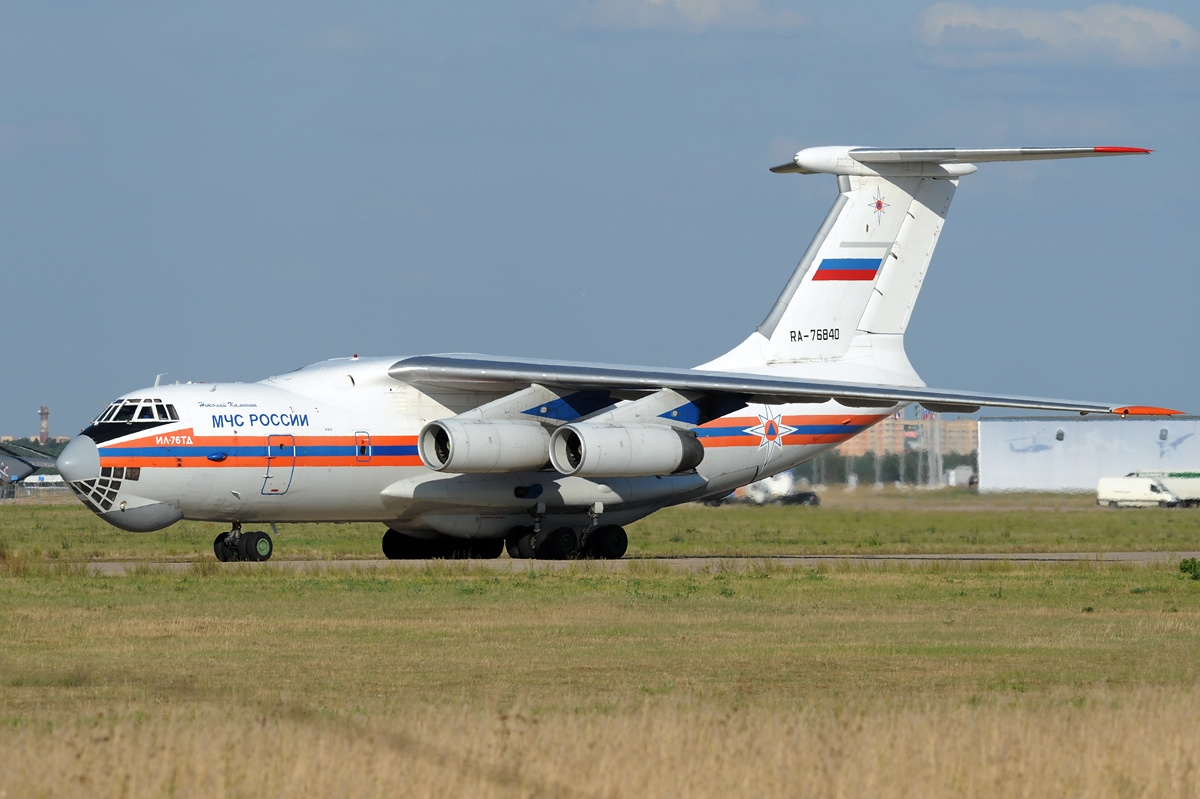
- A Russian Ilyushin Il-76 aerial firefighting aircraft. RA-76840, the aircraft involved in the accident, pictured in 2012.

Accident
- Date: 1 July 2016
- Summary: Crashed during low-level firefighting, cause undetermined
- Site: Near Uyan, Siberia, Russia; approx 54°45′23.11″N 107°48′35.68″E

Aircraft
- Aircraft type: Ilyushin Il-76
- Operator: Russian Ministry of Emergency Situations
- Registration: RA-76840
- Flight origin: Irkutsk International Airport, Irkutsk, Russia
- Destination: Irkutsk International Airport
- Occupants: 10
- Crew: 10
- Fatalities: 10
- Survivors: 0

On the morning of 1 July 2016, an Ilyushin Il-76 aircraft configured for aerial firefighting and belonging to the Russian Ministry of Emergency Situations crashed near Lake Baikal northeast of Irkutsk in Siberia, Russia. All ten crew members were killed.

== Background ==
Prior to the crash a wildfire had been burning near Irkutsk for several weeks. The day the aircraft was found, the aviation division of the Russian forestry agency stated that an area of more than 45,000 hectares (450 km^{2}; 170 sq mi) of forest in Siberia was alight, while Greenpeace's Russian arm stated that, based on its interpretation of satellite data, almost ten times this area was burning just in the Irkutsk region.

== Aircraft ==
The aircraft involved was an Ilyushin Il-76 four-engine freighter fitted out for aerial firefighting, with manufacturer's serial number 1033417553 and registration RA-76840; it was almost 22 years old.

== Crews ==
- Captain: Leonid Semyonovich Filin
- First Officer: Alexei Alekseevich Lebedev
- Flight Engineer: Viktor Nikolaevich Kuznetsov
- Navigator: Georgy Lavrentievich Petrov
- Flight Radio Operator: Igor Evgenievich Murakhin
- Flight Operator: Sergei Anatolievich Susov
- Flight Operator: Sergei Arkadievich Makarov
- Flight Operator: Marat Marklenovich Khandayev
- Flight Technician: Vadim Georgievich Zhdanov
- Flight Technician: Andrei Mikhailovich Mashninov

== Flight ==
The Ilyushin Il-76 took off from Runway 12 at Irkutsk International Airport not long after sunrise at 06:18 local time, on a mission to fight forest fires. The last communication with the aircraft was sixteen minutes later at 06:34, when it was flying above the Bayandayevsky District in a north-easterly direction at an altitude of 9,900 feet (3,000 m).

== Recovery and investigation ==
After contact was lost with the aircraft, it was declared missing, which prompted a search and rescue operation. A hundred rescue workers were parachuted into the area where the aircraft disappeared. The search efforts eventually involved sixteen aircraft and 441 people in total. The search was difficult because of the large territory and the inaccessibility of the area. Ground vehicles were not able to reach the area where the Il-76 disappeared. The high temperatures combined with the low visibility from the thick smoke and trees made the operations difficult, especially for ground units. After two days of searching, the crashed aircraft was finally found.

The aircraft was found near the village of Uyan in the Kachugsky District, about 150 miles (240 km) northeast of where contact with it was lost, burnt out except for the rear fuselage and tail. There were no survivors among the ten people on board. The wreckage was found by a firefighter. Investigators interviewed witnesses in the village of Karan who described seeing the aircraft flying above them before hearing a large "clap" after it dropped water, but not being able to hear the engines.

The flight recorders were found to be damaged by heat but their data were extracted and analysed, revealing no technical failures during the flight. There was an investigation by the Interstate Aviation Committee and others. They found that the crew had chosen to fly at minimum altitude over the area. In the last few seconds preceding the crash, the crew attempted to gain altitude. The thick smoke may have led to the choice of flight profile. The captain of the aircraft was reported to have more than 12,000 hours' flying experience; the copilot more than 5,500 hours; and the navigator more than 7,000 hours.

Investigators found that the hot air from the wildfires could have caused loss of engine thrust, resulting in loss of altitude. The Il-76's tail may have then clipped a hillock, causing the rest of the aircraft to collide with the hillside. The crew may have lost control of the aircraft after it started hitting trees.

== Aftermath ==
Flags were flown at half-mast and television programmes were cancelled as respect for those who were killed.

The Russian Minister of Emergency Situations Vladimir Puchkov told the families of the deceased crew that he "expresses his condolences". He stated that "All our Emergencies Ministry team is mourning. These were professional pilots and rescuers. We will never forget them." The pilots were said to be experienced, and had been in the job for decades.

The Chairman of the Interstate Aviation Committee Sergei Yakimenko also commented on the incident, citing that human, equipment, and environmental factors may have all contributed to the crash.

== See also ==
- 2009 Yakutia Ilyushin Il-76 crash
