= S7 Airlines Flight 778 =

2006 aviation accident in Russia

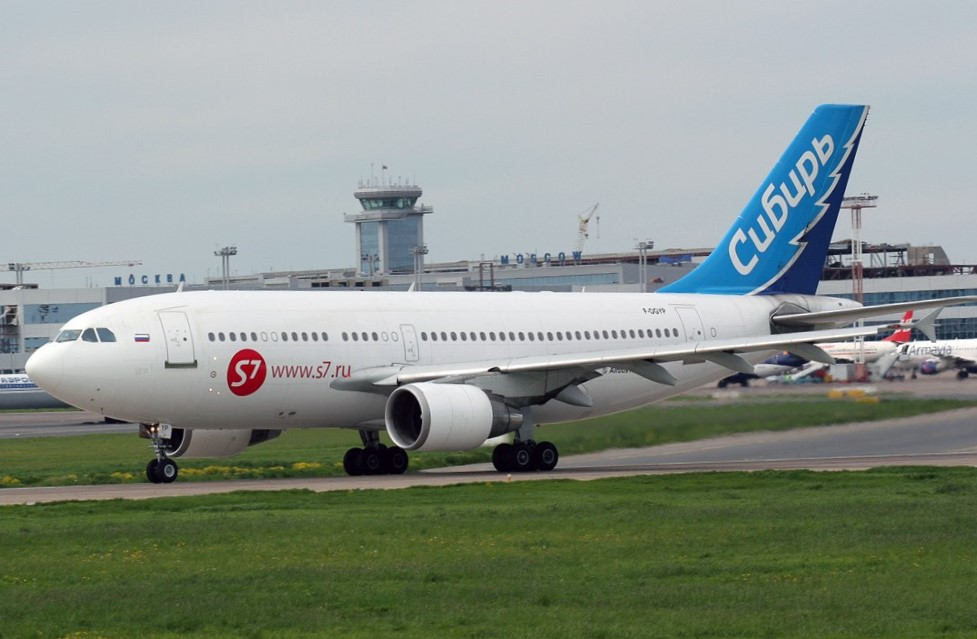
- F-OGYP, the aircraft involved in the accident, pictured in June 2006

Accident
- Date: 9 July 2006
- Summary: Runway overrun due to pilot error
- Site: Irkutsk International Airport, Irkutsk, Irkutsk Oblast, Russia; 52°16′29.35″N 104°21′59.71″E

Aircraft
- Aircraft type: Airbus A310-324
- Operator: S7 Airlines
- IATA flight No.: S7778
- ICAO flight No.: SBI778
- Call sign: SIBERIAN 778
- Registration: F-OGYP
- Flight origin: Domodedovo International Airport, Moscow, Russia
- Destination: Irkutsk International Airport, Irkutsk, Russia
- Occupants: 203
- Passengers: 195
- Crew: 8
- Fatalities: 125
- Injuries: 63
- Survivors: 78

S7 Airlines Flight 778 was a scheduled domestic passenger flight from Moscow to Irkutsk, Russia. On 9 July 2006, at 06:44 local time (8 July, 22:44 UTC), the Airbus A310 aircraft operating the route overran the runway during its landing in Irkutsk. The aircraft failed to stop and crashed through the airport's concrete perimeter fence, struck rows of private garages and burst into flames, killing 125 people.

With 125 deaths, the crash remains as S7 Airlines' deadliest aviation disaster. The crash was also the second Russian air disaster in two months, after Armavia Flight 967.

The final report of the Interstate Aviation Committee (MAK) investigation concluded that the cause of the crash was attributed to pilot error. While the captain was reducing the thrust reverser of the right engine, he unintentionally moved the left engine's throttle lever forward, causing the left engine to produce significant thrust. His co-pilot failed to monitor the engine parameters and as a result the crew were unable to realize the source of the problem. The crew failed to resolve the issue and the aircraft eventually overran the runway and crashed.

== Background ==
=== Aircraft ===
The aircraft involved, manufactured in 1987, was a 19-year-old Airbus A310-324 registered F-OGYP.

=== Passengers and crew ===
People on board by nationality
Nationality	Passengers	Crew	Total
Russia	181	8	189
Germany	3	0	3
China	3	0	3
Poland	2	0	2
Belarus	3	0	3
Moldova	2	0	2
Azerbaijan	1	0	1
Total	195	8	203

There were 195 passengers and 8 crew members aboard (2 pilots and 6 flight attendants), totaling 203 people. The ITAR-Tass news agency in Russia reported that many children were among the passengers who were flying to a holiday on Lake Baikal, near Irkutsk, about 4,200 kilometres (2,600 mi; 2,300 nmi) east of Moscow. A total of 14 children, up to age 12, were on board. Besides Russian citizens, there were 14 other non-Russians on board, 3 each from Germany, China, and Belarus, 2 each from Moldova and Poland and 1 from Azerbaijan.

Among the passengers were Maria Rasputina, the daughter of Russian writer Valentin Rasputin and Sergei Koryakov, the head of Federal Security Service (FSB) of Irkutsk region.

The captain was 45-year-old Sergey Gennadievich Shibanov, who had been working for the airline since June 2005. He had 10,611 flight hours, including 1,056 hours on the Airbus A310. He graduated from Ulyanovsk Institute of Civil Aviation in 1991 and obtained his civil aviation pilot license in 1993. He was authorized to carry out international flights in 1997 and had been flying the A310 since May 2005.

The first officer was 48-year-old Vladimir Grigoryevich Chernykh, who had 9,771 flight hours, with 158 of them on the Airbus A310. He graduated from Kirovograd Civil Aviation Flight Academy in 1983 and obtained his civil aviation license in 1996. He had undergone a conversion training in April 2006 and was subsequently appointed as a co-pilot of the Airbus A310 in May.

== Flight ==
S7 Airlines Flight 778 was a flight from Moscow's Domodedovo International Airport to Irkutsk, a major Siberian city in Irkutsk Oblast. Irkutsk International Airport is one of the airports that serves the region near Lake Baikal, which is also a major tourist attraction in the country. The flight was one of the most popular flights in Russia. As it was July, the summer holiday was in effect and the flight was packed with tourists who were going to travel to Lake Baikal.

On 9 July 2006, Flight 778 was scheduled to take off from Domodedovo International Airport at 20:15 Moscow Time (UTC 17:15). On board were 195 passengers and 8 crew members; 2 cockpit crew and 6 flight attendants. The flight was commanded by Captain Shibanov and his co-pilot was First Officer Chernykh. The aircraft took off at 20:17 local time and the course to Irkutsk was set. Due to the possibility of foggy condition in Irkutsk, the nearby Bratsk Airport was listed as the alternate airport for Flight 778. The estimated time of arrival in Irkutsk was at 06:44 Irkutsk Time (UTC 22:44).

At 06:16 Irkutsk Time, the crew reached the starting point for their descent to Irkutsk. They contacted the on-duty controller and obtained clearance to descend to 5,700 meters. During the descent, the crew elected to turn on the engines' anti-icing system. The aircraft descended with an average vertical speed of 12 m/s. Flight 778 was eventually handed over to Irkutsk Approach and was cleared to descent to 2,100 meters. As it was descending, the crew decided to turn on the wings' anti-icing for at least 3 minutes. The crew received the automatic terminal information service (ATIS) for the weather in Irkutsk. The report stated that the visibility was 3,500 meters, surface wind at 4 m/s, increase in cloud base height from 170 meters to 190 meters, light torrential rain and cumulonimbus-covered sky. After receiving the ATIS information, they requested the approach clearance to Irkutsk.

The crew finished the final leg of the approach and requested further permission to continue their approach. They eventually established the glidepath and then carried out the landing checklist. The aircraft was then configured for landing. The crew asked permission to land and the controller granted their request. The autopilot and the autothrottle were disengaged. When the aircraft got out of clouds, the pilots realized that it had deviated a bit to the right of the runway. To correct this, they made a small elevator deflection, which momentarily increased the aircraft's vertical speed, causing the "sink rate" warning to briefly sound.

At 06:43 Irkutsk Time, Flight 778 landed at Irkutsk's Runway 30 with an airspeed of 132 knots.

=== Accident ===
Immediately after the touch down, Captain Shibanov armed the spoilers and engaged the aircraft's autobrake to low mode. The reverse throttle lever of the right engine was then pulled to the maximum level to slow down the aircraft. The reverse lever of the left engine, however, was left untouched. Captain Shibanov then pushed the right engine reverse thrust to decrease the rate of deceleration. During the landing roll, the take-off warning suddenly alerted the crew on the aircraft's configuration. As the take-off alert appeared during Flight 778's landing roll, the crew shrugged it off, thinking that it was an error on the warning system. First Officer Chernykh then tried multiple times to erase the warning from the aircraft's cockpit monitor (ECAM). He then reported that Flight 778 had successfully landed on the runway. The controller gave landing confirmation to the crew and instructed them to exit the runway to the left along taxiway 6.

After completing the required tasks for landing, the crew expected the aircraft to slow down. However, it did not and instead it began to pick up speed again. The aircraft had taken up a large portion of the runway with only 800 meters remaining of the runway's asphalt. Captain Shibanov noticed this and asked First Officer Chernykh about what was happening on their aircraft. First Officer Chernykh answered that the RPM was increasing. Captain Shibanov then ordered him to deploy the right engine's thrust reverser again. Subsequently, the right engine thrust reverser was put at its maximum level. Simultaneously, Captain Shibanov tried to slow the aircraft down by applying brakes on full-force.

07:44:18	Captain	What's wrong?
07:44:18	First officer	Speed's increasing
07:44:19	Captain	Reverse once again!
07:44:20	First officer	We're rolling off the runway!

The crew successfully decreased the aircraft's speed, however the aircraft did not stop. They began to run out of runway as they became closer to the end. Due to their significantly high speed, the aircraft flight system disengaged the spoilers and the autobrakes.

During the commotion, one of the airport's fire trucks had noticed the aircraft's abnormal movement, in which it rolled out in high velocity. The chief of the fire truck then decided to follow Flight 778 and notified the observer of the airport's fire brigade about his intention. Using binoculars, the observer also decided to follow the aircraft's movement. The on-duty air traffic controller, who was observing Flight 778 from the airport's control tower, also noticed that the aircraft was not slowing down.

In the cockpit, the flight crew quickly became confused as to the nature and extent of the situation. The aircraft began to swerve to the left. To counter it, the crew stepped on the rudder pedal and the aircraft started to drift to the right. The crew then tried to correct it again by fully pressing the left rudder pedal but the aircraft continued to drift towards the right. The aircraft then went off the runway at a speed of about 180 kilometres per hour (97 kn; 110 mph) and travelled across the airport's grassy area. In desperation, Captain Shibanov ordered the engines to be shut down.

07:44:27	First officer	Why?
07:44:28	Captain	I don't know.
07:44:31	First officer	Oh my!
07:44:32	Captain	Shut down the engines!
07:44:34	Commentary	Sounds consistent with departure from prepared surface.
07:44:37	Commentary	Sound of first impact.
07:44:40	Commentary	Sounds of numerous impacts.
07:44:41	Commentary	End of recording.

Despite their efforts, the aircraft did not stop. The left engine then clipped an antenna of the airport's localizer beacon and also the fences surrounding it. It then travelled across a road before it finally smashed onto the airport's concrete perimeter fence at a speed of 97 knots (180 kph). The impact caused the nose gear to collapse. The engines detached from the pylons and the aircraft's left wing was sheared off. The fuel on the wings then ignited, creating massive burst of flames. The cabin lights immediately went out. The aircraft then struck rows of private garages and finally stopped. The crash immediately killed one woman passenger, while the rest managed to survive with varying degrees of injuries.

=== Rescue operation ===
As the aircraft struck the perimeter fence and burst into flames, the observer gave an alarm to the airport's firefighting services on the crash. The two controllers inside the ATC tower saw the explosions from the crash and alerted the airport's emergency services. An emergency alarm was transmitted throughout every departments in the airport. Due to the crash, the airport was closed from further operation.

Meanwhile, in the aircraft, thick smoke entered the cabin. The leaking fuel spilled under the fuselage and under the cabin floor, enabling the fire to spread rapidly throughout the entire aircraft. By the forward entry doors, the floor had been ripped off by the impact and both entry doors had been destroyed. The flight attendant stationed on the right was unconscious, while the flight attendant stationed on the left entry door was dangling by her seatbelt. There was a growing fire around her seat, preventing her from reaching the passengers. Underneath her, another fire could be seen. She unfastened her seatbelt and fell from a height of 3 meters. She suffered burns due to the fire, but survived as she immediately escaped the burning aircraft.

In the rest of the cabin, panic quickly set in. Passengers began to scream as they scrambled towards the nearest exits. Passengers in the business class and the economy class in the forward section managed to escape through gaps and holes on the right sidewall that had been formed by the crash. On the central portion of the aircraft, two flight attendants who were stationed at the area tried to open the overwing emergency doors. The emergency door on the left could not be opened due to the raging fire under the left wing. The flight attendant on that station later died due to acute carbon monoxide poisoning. The door on the right was able to be opened and passengers immediately poured onto the right wing. The survivors then jumped onto the nearby roofs.

Two other flight attendants were stationed at the rear. Following the impact, numerous metal containers of airline meal poured onto the flight attendant who was stationed at the right rear door, burying her. She later freed herself from the pile and assisted the evacuation. The right rear door could not be opened due to the massive pile of metal containers. The left rear door was opened and the crew tried to inflate the chute. The chute could not inflate since it had been sliced by wreckage on the ground. Passengers had to jump from a high height.

The chaotic situation combined with the dark condition that had been caused by the smoke and the intense fire inside the cabin hindered the evacuation process. Several passengers had to crawl due to the smoke. The first firefighting vehicle, the one that had followed Flight 778 prior to the crash, arrived at the site 15 seconds after the start of the fire. Approximately 65 seconds after the aircraft had caught fire, a total of 67 passengers had been evacuated by the cabin crew. The other trucks arrived within 2–3 minutes. Deployed personnel then tried to pry open the rear right door, which could not be opened earlier due to the metal containers. They managed to rescue 11 other passengers until the flames became too dangerous. The area around the wreckage was later cordoned off by authorities.

Television pictures showed smoking ruins of the Airbus with only the tail section intact. It took two hours for local firefighters from five different fire stations to extinguish the blaze.

== Casualties ==
Out of 203 passengers and crew on board, 125 were killed: 5 crew members and 120 passengers. The captain and the first officer died in the accident, while 3 out of 6 flight attendants were killed. Forensic examination on the bodies of 120 passengers concluded that 119 passengers were killed by carbon monoxide poisoning, while 1 female passenger was killed by severe head trauma that had been inflicted by the crash. As of 20 July, a total of 109 bodies had been identified. The remains of the flight attendants were also recovered from the wreckage. According to authorities, due to the severe charring of their remains, only one flight attendant could be identified.

A total of 78 people, consisted of 75 passengers and 3 flight attendants, survived the crash. Six children were among the survivors. Of the 78 survivors, 60 were taken to the hospital in Irkutsk. Of those, 38 suffered serious injuries and the other 22 suffered minor injuries. Due to the severity their injuries, 8 survivors were transported to Moscow for further treatment. Six people, including a 10-year-old child, were reportedly in critical condition. A total of 14 survivors also reportedly refused medical assistance.

Some survivors said they owed their lives to the flight attendant who managed to open the emergency exit in the rear of the aircraft. The two Polish passengers, who had been in the tail section, both survived. They managed to escape the aircraft unassisted, one injuring a leg. Chinese officials reported that one of their citizens from Inner Mongolia had survived the crash with burn injuries, however the other two were missing. Russian state-owned media RIA Novosti reported that two Polish nationals, two Belarusians, two Germans and one Azerbaijani were being treated at a hospital in Irkutsk. According to the Belarusian embassy, three Belarusians were among the injured.

== Response ==
Officials set up a crisis centre in Moscow's Domodedovo International Airport for the relatives of the victims. Ambulances were put on standby and families were provided with social workers. The names of those who had survived the crash were put on a list in the airport's conference hall. S7 Airlines announced plans to fly the families of the victims to Irkutsk. Ministry of Emergency Situations announced that a team of psychologists would be flown from Moscow to Irkutsk with an Ilyushin Il-76. Additionally, two ambulances and five tonnes of cargo, consisting of medicines and various medical equipment, would be provided as well.

Presidential envoy to the Siberian Federal District stated that all of the victims and the relatives would be provided with necessary help, including financial assistance. According to RBK, compensations would be given to the relatives. Relatives of those who were killed would be given with ₽100,000 rubles and those who were injured would be given with ₽50,000 rubles. Speaking in a meeting of government commission, governor of Irkutsk Alexander Tishanin stated that compensations would be provided by the government of Irkutsk Oblast. S7 Airlines agreed to take part in the payments, adding that relatives should contact their lawyers to obtain them. Medical treatments would be covered in the compensation. Voluntary donations amounted to 35 million rubles were also distributed to the families of the victims.

In response to the crash, Russian prosecutors opened a criminal inquiry.

Russian President Vladimir Putin offered condolences to the families and friends of the victims and ordered authorities to open an inquiry. He later declared 10 July as a national day of mourning. Flags would fly at half-mast across the country and cultural institutions and television stations were called to cancel entertainment programs to commemorate the victims of the crash. Patriarch Alexy II of Moscow expressed grief to the families of the victims and instructed the archbishop of Irkutsk to show "moral and spiritual support" to the families. A memorial service was later held in Moscow's Cathedral of Christ the Saviour. Mayor of Irkutsk announced that a memorial stone would be unveiled at the crash site and a memorial service would also be held. The installment of chapel or monument in the memorial area would be discussed further between the city's officials.

On 14 July, both pilots were buried in Irkutsk.

In December 2006, during an awards ceremony in Moscow's Red Army Theatre, flight attendant Viktoria Zilberstein was awarded by Federation of Jewish Communities of Russia for her heroic actions during the evacuation of the passengers on board.

== Investigation ==
Russia's Interstate Aviation Committee (MAK) was ordered to investigate the crash. Contributing parties of the investigation were Russia's Federal Service for Supervision of Transport (Rostransnadzor) of the Ministry of Transport, Federal Air Transport Agency (Rosaviatsiya), Rosaeronavigatsiya, representatives from Irkutsk Airport, Aeroflot and S7 Airlines. As the manufacturer of the aircraft, Airbus sent a team of experts to assist in the investigation. French BEA, US NTSB and German BFU were also appointed as accredited representatives. Pratt & Whitney also assisted in the investigation of the crash.

Both aircraft recorders, the flight data recorder and cockpit voice recorder, were recovered from the crash site on 9 July. The cockpit voice recorder was intact, while the flight data recorder showed signs of damage on its outer case and required special care to decipher the content. Both recorders were sent to Moscow on 10 July for decryption. The data from both recorders was successfully downloaded in good quality.

In the wake of the crash, several theories immediately surfaced. Most media outlets reported that a brake failure had occurred in Flight 778. Irina Andrianova, a spokesperson for the Ministry of Emergency Situations, said, "The aircraft veered off the runway on landing. It was travelling at a terrific speed." News agencies reported that the pilots advised air traffic controllers they had landed successfully, but that radio contact then broke off suddenly. Russian prosecutors reported that the crash was most likely had been caused by human error or equipment failure. Speaking before flying from Moscow to Irkutsk, Russian Transport Minister Igor Levitin was quoted as saying the runway was wet after rain and that a technical failure should be considered as one of the causes of the crash.

According to Airbus, the aircraft was properly maintained. The most recent A Check, or maintenance check, on the aircraft was on 1 June 2006, Sibir said. A C Check, which involves a more thorough overhaul, was carried out 12 July 2005 in Frankfurt.

=== Faulty aircraft ===
In the immediate aftermath, the cause of the crash of Flight 778 was unofficially attributed to some sort of mechanical errors, with the brakes in particular as the most frequently cited and scrutinized by the media. Many news outlets, citing from state-owned Russian media, reported that brake failures had occurred during the landing. According to FlightGlobal, there were speculations among Russian pilots that the crash had been caused by reverser-thrust asymmetry. This was due to the fact that the aircraft landed in the touchdown zone of the runway before it took some distance to slow down, slewing to the right and eventually left the runway concrete portion. Others reported that, according to the survivors, the aircraft had initially slowed down but it suddenly accelerated again. Investigators stated that human error or equipment failure was the likely cause of the crash.

The maintenance log revealed that the aircraft had undergone a C check, the highest level of aircraft maintenance check, in July the previous year in Germany. The log also showed that, from June to July 2006, a total of 50 defects were reported. Of these defects, 29 were fixed prior to the next flight departure and the repair on the other defects were delayed. Even though the rectification of the defects was postponed, it was actually still in conformance with the minimum equipment list (MEL) of the maintenance manual. Before 8 July, another 5 defects were reported, 4 of which were rectified before the flight on 9 July. According to the logbook, one of the defects were the inoperable state of the left thrust reverser and failure on one of the retraction system of the aircraft's flaps. These defects were not fixed until the crash.

While these defects were present during the crash, there was no brake failure as the brakes were still in good condition, ruling it out as one of the causes of the crash. The deactivated left thrust reverser was still in accordance with the minimum equipment list and as long as the crew did not apply thrust on the left engine's reverse lever, as per the correct procedure, then the flight should have landed safely. Other than the deactivated state of the left thrust reverser, there were no known major defects which would have caused the aircraft to overshoot the runway.

The investigation revealed that there were other similar aviation incidents in which an Airbus A310-300 with deactivated thrust reverser suddenly suffered significant forward motion during its landing run. In one case, an Airbus A310 of Mahan Air in Tehran, the crew failed to stop the aircraft and it eventually overran the runway. Several incidents involving other type of aircraft were also noted as well. In particular, an incident involving a United Airlines DC-10 in 1982. According to the investigation, the crew of the DC-10 attempted the landing run by applying the reverse thrust of all three engines. The landing was attempted on a wet runway, similar to Flight 778. While the thrust reverser of the engines were applied by the crew, the aircraft's engine number 1 remained in forward thrust and the aircraft accelerated. The crew lost their control and the aircraft veered off the runway. One passenger was injured due to the incident.

The mentioned incidents were attributed to pilot error. In each of the mentioned flights, the pilots accidentally moved the throttle lever of the other engines, causing the engine to produce significant forward thrust. The crews lost their control and failed to resolve the issue, causing their aircraft to veer off. As there were similarities between the previous incidents and Flight 778, a deeper analysis would be needed regarding the actions of the pilots of Flight 778 during the landing run.

=== Landing in Irkutsk ===
Flight 778 landed in Irkutsk at 06:44 local time. As it was raining at the time, the runway was wet, though the ATIS information indicated that it was safe to use for a landing. Immediately after touch down, the crew armed the spoilers and autobrake to reduce their speed. To decrease it further, the crew then should deploy the thrust reverse by pulling the thrust lever. Captain Shibanov, who was seated at the left, then pulled the engine reverse thrust lever of the right engine to its idle position. A few seconds later, the lever was pulled to its maximum level. As a result, the reverse thrust started to increase. Meanwhile, the reverse thrust of the left engine was not engaged by the crew as the reverser was in deactivated state.

The minimum equipment list that had been provided by Airbus and S7 Airlines clearly stated that, if one thrust reverser was in a deactivated state, the pilots must hold that lever in its idle position to prevent any accidental forward movement. Despite being listed on their manual, S7 Airlines did not provide a training course for this exact situation. The recorder of Flight 778 revealed that, as the right engine thrust reverser was pulled to its maximum thrust, the left throttle lever moved forward by a little. Because of it, the throttle lever of the left engine was aligned with the reverse thrust lever of the right engine.

External videos
- FDR recording
- Animation of FDR recording on YouTube

A few seconds after touch down, the crew decided to reduce the level of the reverse thrust. In order to do this, the crew should push the reverse thrust lever forward. Captain Shibanov then pushed the right reverse lever forward. Simultaneously, the left throttle lever began to move forward as well. At first, the unintentional movement managed to stop and the reverse thrust of the right engine had reached its idle position. However, the crew decided to add another reverse thrust to the right engine. The lever was pulled and the left engine throttle lever was aligned again with the right reverse lever. The crew then decided to reduce the level of the right engine reverse thrust and the left engine lever moved forward again. This time, the throttle moved so much that it produced 60% of forward thrust to the aircraft. Meanwhile, the right engine thrust reverse had been on idle.

As the only remaining thrust was the forward thrust from the left engine, the aircraft consequently went into take-off mode. The Airbus take-off system then thought that the crew was going to fly again. Due to the landing configuration that had been set by the crew, the take-off warning tried to alert the crew on the improper configuration. The pilots were surprised by the alarm as it somehow sounded during their landing run. Instead of questioning the possible reasons of its activation, they immediately thought that it was a glitch and as a result they tried to erase the warning from the cockpit central monitor.

First Officer Chernykh then reported to the ATC that they had successfully landed at the airport. He then began to notice that the aircraft started to increase its speed. Subsequently, he applied maximum reverse thrust on the right engine. However, because of the safety feature on the Airbus, the system cancelled his action. This was due to the fact that the left engine thrust was adding significant forward thrust, at a 60% level. The thrust reverse doors eventually failed to unlock and the reverse thrust of the right engine stayed on its idle forward thrust position. The action of First Officer Chernykh was, therefore, rendered useless. Captain Shibanov then tried to slow down the aircraft by stepping on the brakes with full force. He managed to stabilize the speed, but the aircraft kept moving forward.

Simultaneously with the pilots' attempt to slow down the aircraft, the forward thrust from the left engine created another problem as well. As the left engine was producing significant forward thrust and the right engine was at its idle position, this created a thrust asymmetry. The thrust from the left then caused the aircraft to start drifting towards the right. The pilots then tried to make the aircraft to stay on the runway and so they pressed the left rudder pedal. The aircraft then drifted towards the left. However, the pilots had pressed the pedal with excessive force and thus the aircraft started to drift excessively as well towards the left. To counter it, the crew made a small right rudder input. Despite the small input, the aircraft drastically turned towards the right. This took the crew by surprise and they tried hard to counter it by pressing the left rudder pedal again with full force. The aircraft, however, did not turn much.

The aircraft eventually veered off the runway. Captain Shibanov then shouted at First Officer Chernykh to shut down the engines. His order, however, was not followed through as the First Officer did not shut down the engines. Subsequently, as the engines were not shut down, the left engine kept providing forward thrust. The aircraft failed to slow down, overran the runway, and crashed.

=== Accidental thrust ===
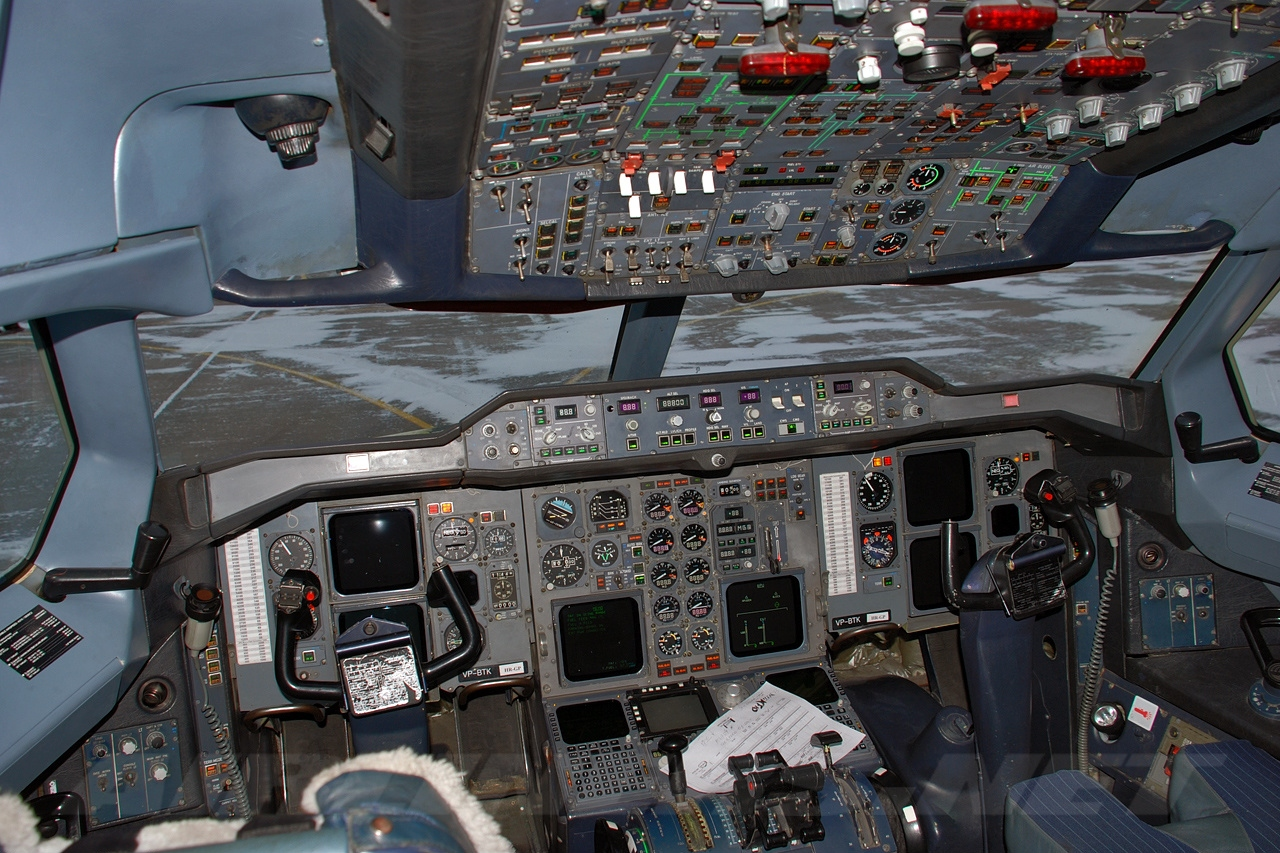
The cockpit of an S7 Airlines Airbus A310, with thrust lever visible in the center of the cockpit

Based on the recorded parameter of the FDR, it was evident that the thrust lever of the left engine had been accidentally moved by the crew, most likely by Captain Shibanov as the pilot flying. The unintentional movement concurrently happened with the decrease of the right engine reverser thrust.

Captain Shibanov was seated on the left as he was the pilot flying for the flight. The throttle lever of the right engine reverse thrust was located at the right. To reach this lever, he needed to reach over the left engine lever. While moving the right engine reverse thrust lever, it was believed that he had rested the rear part of his palm on the left throttle. Due to this, as he decreased the reverse thrust of the right engine by pushing the lever forward, the left engine got caught with his palm and inadvertently moved forward, simultaneously, with the reverse thrust lever of the right engine.

Normally, a significant amount of force is needed to move the throttle lever. In Flight 778, the throttle lever somehow managed to move quite easily even though Captain Shibanov had only applied a small force, merely by resting his palm on the lever. It was discovered that the coupling that linked the throttle lever with the engine control had weakened. The throttle lever of the aircraft was equipped with a coupling. This would result in friction and pilots would need to apply force to move it. To adjust the required forces, the tightness of the friction unit must be changed during a certain inspection. This inspection was carried out irregularly as it was only carried out whenever the pilots felt uncomfortable with the throttle. The logbook of the involved aircraft, F-OGYP, did not even indicate that any inspection or correction regarding the friction forces had ever been conducted during its entire operational history.

As per EASA, the problem of low friction force on the linkage between the throttle control and the throttle lever was not considered as an airworthiness issue. Fleet inspection could only be carried out if there were continuous airworthiness concerns.

F-OGYP, the involved aircraft, was considered to be old by investigators. As no inspection or correction had been carried out on the friction force of the throttle control linkage, the coupling had weakened, which greatly reduced the forces needed to move the throttle by up to 400 grams. The forces were 3 times lower than the permissible amount. This explained why a relatively small force (e.g. resting palm) could move the throttle significantly forward.

The accidental movement of the throttle lever, however, should have been noticed by the captain. The move itself was significantly large, reaching 60% on the thrust setting. According to investigators, another factor might have played a role in this matter. Simulations were conducted on an attempted landing in two different scenarios; landing on a smooth runway and a bumpy runway. The noticeability of the lever movement was significantly different between the two scenarios. Pilots were more likely to not notice that the lever had moved during landing in a bumpy runway. The presence of shakings and deceleration caused the movement of the throttle lever to be not noticed by the crew. In Irkutsk, the runway was described as bumpy and thus this might have "hidden" the movement of the lever from Captain Shibanov.

Despite these findings, there was enough time for the crew to realize the source of the problem. The aircraft landed on the runway's touchdown zone, which would have provided the crew with a long distance to effectively slow down their aircraft. Even though the runway was wet, calculations made by investigators showed that with appropriate corrective actions the crash would have been avoided. Had they paid attention to their aircraft, they would not have crashed.

=== Crew's mental state ===
After the touch down and during the deceleration stage, the crew might have experienced a specific psychological aspect which was referred by investigators as premature mental mobilization. According to the report, the mental state is characterized by a decrease in pilot alertness, nervousness and emotional moment, even though the principal activity of the pilots have not been fully completed. In the case of Flight 778, the pilots had decreased their awareness even though they had not fully stopped their aircraft. They knew that they had reached their destination and the next required step to complete the flight was to taxi to the airport apron.

This decrease in alertness eventually caused them to not carefully monitor their aircraft. When the left engine throttle lever moved forward and the aircraft began to pick up speed again, First Officer Chernykh, who was responsible for scanning the aircraft instruments and flight parameters during the entire flight, did not notice the change in the flight parameters and the movement of the throttle. The system then proceeded to warn the crew on their improper configuration, as the engines had gone into take-off mode. The crew, who did not notice the throttle movement, thought that it was improbable for a take-off warning to sound during a landing roll. They developed a "phenomenon of mistrust", as per the description given by investigators, as they did not believe that the take-off configuration warning was working properly. First Officer Chernykh immediately concluded that this must have happened due to a glitch in the system and as such he tried multiple times to erase the warning by pushing the clear and recall buttons on the ECAM.

First Officer Chernykh, who was eager to finish the flight, then immediately called the ATC to report on their successful landing, even though the aircraft had not slowed down to the required speed for taxiing. By this point, the aircraft had used most of the runway. When it became obvious that the aircraft was not slowing down, both pilots were suddenly faced with significant pressure to quickly resolve the issue. Flight 778 was already well down the runway. There was only a small amount of asphalt left for them to conduct a safe deceleration. With the quickly approaching runway end, the pilots began to panic.

Psychological tests that had been conducted on Captain Shibanov revealed that he had a tendency of being emotionally intense and unstable, with a sense of heightened self-control. Due to his personality trait, he was much more prone to stress, which could lead to disorganization of teamwork. During the commotion regarding the aircraft's failure to stop, he failed to think clearly as he quickly became confused on the situation. He eventually ordered First Officer Chernykh to shut down the engines but his order was not addressed clearly to First Officer Chernykh. The order to shut down the engines was also regarded as too late as it came out approximately 7 seconds before impact.

Meanwhile, following the call from Captain Shibanov to shut down the engines, First Officer Chernykh failed to follow the captain's order. He was probably paralyzed by fear or was in so much stress that he reverted to his habits during service with his previous type, the Tupolev Tu-154, where a flight engineer was usually present in the cockpit. According to investigators, he probably thought that there was a flight engineer inside the cockpit, who would have shut down the engines as it was usually the job of the flight engineer to assist the crew in certain situations, even though in reality the flight engineer did not exist in the cockpit. Hence, the engines were not shut down by First Officer Chernykh.

=== S7 safety culture ===
To investigate on whether structural factors might have contributed to the crash, investigators decided to analyse the management of S7 Airlines and the technical operation of S7 Airlines' Airbus A310. The investigation further revealed a problematic safety culture within S7 Airlines.

S7 Airlines started to operate the Airbus A310 in July 2004. The operation of the Airbus A310 became more frequent as the fleet continued to grow. Concurrently, the number of incidents had also increased in number. Comparing the number of incidents between Airbus A310 that had been operated by Aeroflot and the Airbus A310 that had been operated by S7 Airlines revealed that there had been a two-fold increase in terms of flight hours per incidents. The level of safety of the Airbus A310 that were operated by S7 Airlines had fallen approximately four times lower than that of Aeroflot.

Simultaneously, with the rapid expansion of S7 Airlines, the number of requested spare parts for the maintenance of their fleets quickly skyrocketed. While the number of requested spare parts were in the thousands, the available stocks were only in the hundreds. Combined with the difficult customs clearance for importing spare parts from abroad, S7 Airlines eventually had to resort to the deferred defects practices, where damaged part of an aircraft was swapped with the functioning part to rectify it. The aircraft that was involved in the accident, F-OGYP, had also been recently involved in such procedure. On 6 July 2006, three days before the crash, the aircraft flew with a malfunctioning right engine reverser and upon landing the reverser of the left engine became inoperative. During the aircraft's maintenance on the next day, the right engine was fixed with parts from the left engine. The inoperative left engine reverse was listed under deferred defect and the aircraft returned to service on 8 July with the inoperative left engine reverser.

According to investigators, these practices were actually in line with the regulations that had been issued by Russian authorities and the minimum equipment list that had been issued by S7 Airlines. The extensiveness of such practices had never been looked into by officials. Russian aviation authorities enacted lax supervision on S7 Airlines deferred defects practices. Lack of supervision eventually caused defects on S7 Airlines fleet to pile up. Analysis by investigators revealed that during the first six months of 2006, there were 86 defects on the Airbus A310. This amount of defects might compromise the safety of future flights.

The problems were not constricted for the maintenance culture of S7 Airlines fleet as the pilot training was also highlighted by investigators. The evaluation on Captain Shibanov's pilot training revealed that he had been immediately promoted as a captain of the Airbus A310 without gaining experience as a first officer on the type. The findings were noted as "peculiar" as pilots were expected to complete their first officer training on the aircraft type first before possessing the position of captain. The conversion training, which was conducted for pilots who were undergoing conversion into different type of aircraft, was also noted as inadequate. The Tupolev Tu-154, Captain Shibanov's previous aircraft type, was a four-person cockpit crew aircraft while the Airbus A310 was a two-person cockpit crew aircraft. Without adequate cockpit resource management (CRM) training, communication and other issues regarding teamwork might occur.

Issues regarding the conversion of the cockpit crew was also discovered during analysis on the results of the psychological tests that had been conducted on Captain Shibanov. The conversion of Captain Shibanov to Airbus A310 was regarded as "insufficiently justified" by the MAK as the result of his tests indicated that he was an emotional and anxious person and that he was prone to stress. Medical examinations on Captain Shibanov revealed that he had been diagnosed with multiple heart problems and mental stress might have caused symptoms of the diseases to worsen. He had been referred by his doctor to the psychologists regarding his health condition, however the psychologists still allowed him to undergo the conversion training. The findings related to the negative traits of Captain Shibanov, such as prone to stress, were not included by the psychologists and instead they only included the positive traits of Captain Shibanov. Due to this, Captain Shibanov was allowed to fly the Airbus A310.

=== Conclusion ===
The MAK's final report was released in 2007 in both Russian and English. The English translation of the accident final report, on page 115, stated the following conclusion:

The cause of Sibir A-310 F-OGYP accident was the erroneous and uncontrolled actions by the crew during rollout after landing in a configuration with one engine reverser deactivated. After touchdown, the Captain, while acting on the reverse thrust lever of the right engine, inadvertently and uncontrollably moved the throttle lever for the left engine, whose thrust reverser was deactivated, from the "idle" to the significant forward thrust position. Inadequate monitoring and call-outs of airplane speed and engine parameters by the Co-pilot made it impossible for the crew to perform the necessary actions, either by moving the left throttle back to idle or shutting down the engines. The crew had enough time to recognize the situation.

— FINAL REPORT ON THE RESULTS OF THE INVESTIGATION OF THE ACCIDENT, page 115, Interstate Aviation Committee

A total of 57 recommendations were issued by the MAK, which were aimed to Russian aviation authorities, S7 Airlines, Airbus, EASA and other certifying authorities, IATA, ICAO, and Domodedovo Airport. Among the recommendations were calls from the investigators to discontinue the use of thrust reverser altogether if the other one was in faulty condition, to ease the customs on importing spare parts, to pay more attention towards the possibility of accidental movement of an aircraft's thrust lever, and to create a specific procedure for engaging reverse thrust. MAK also issued a request to ICAO regarding the implementation of a video camera inside the cockpit.

== Aftermath ==
In July 2007, prosecutors completed the primary investigation for the criminal case of the crash. The investigation was extended until October 2007 as another analysis was requested by the court. It was later extended again to June 2008 and again to September 2008. Following extensive consideration, the criminal case investigation was terminated in March 2010 by authorities from East Siberian Department for Transport of the Investigative Committee.

A memorial for the victims of the crash was erected at Mozhaisky Street, near the crash site of Flight 778. A service was held in July 2015 to commemorate the accident. The service was attended by families of the victims, representatives from Irkutsk Airport and S7 Airlines.

== See also ==
- TAM Airlines Flight 3054, a Brazilian aviation disaster which occurred due to hydroplaning and keeping forward thrust on the engine whose thrust reverser was deactivated a year later.
