= Lensk Airport =

Airport in Russia

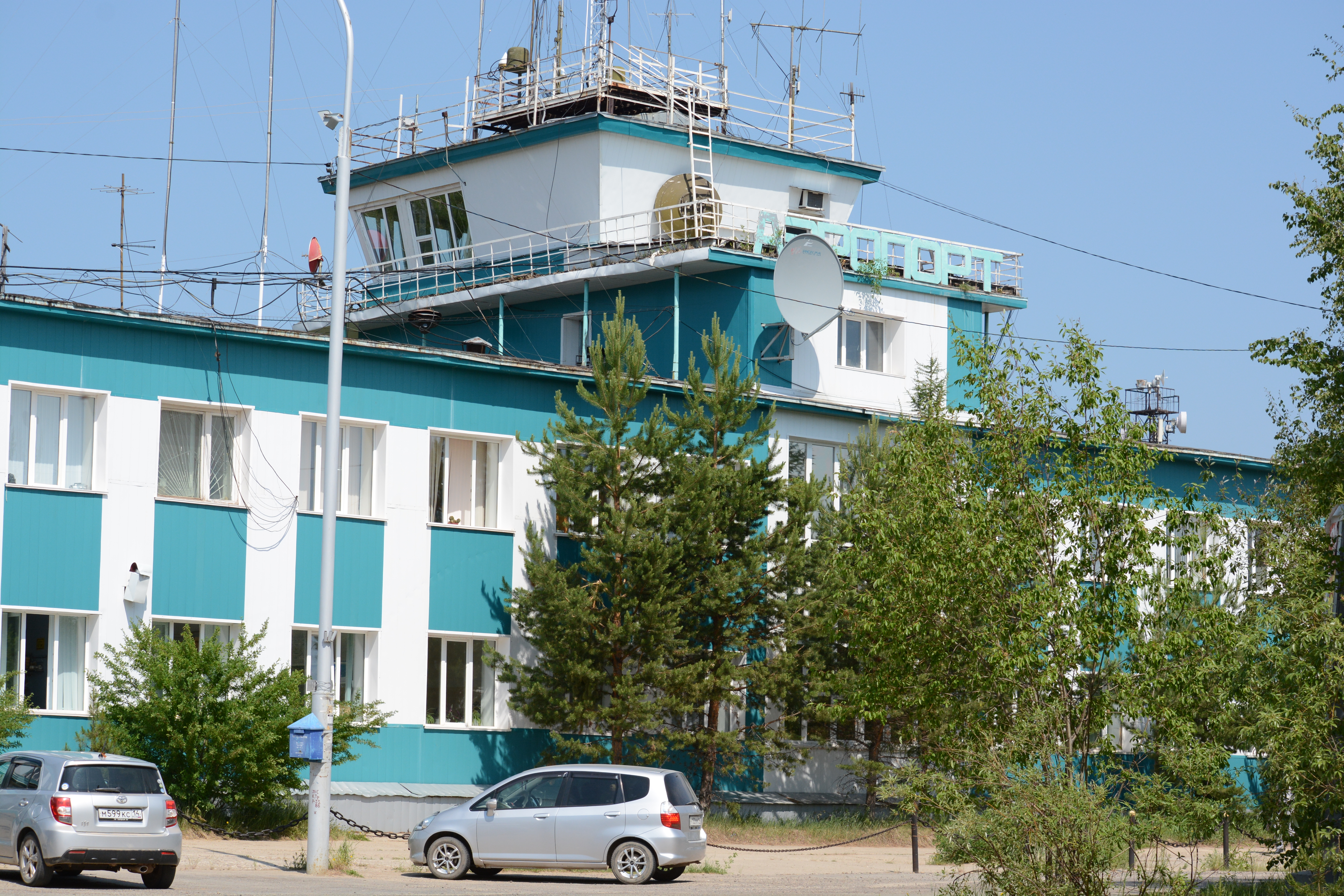
- IATA: ULK; ICAO: UERL; LID: ЛСК

Summary
- Airport type: Public
- Operator: Airports of the North
- Serves: Lensk
- Location: Lensk, Russia
- Elevation AMSL: 801 ft / 244 m
- Coordinates: 60°43′14″N 114°49′33″E
- Website: sever.aero/lensk]

Map
- Location of the airport in the Sakha Republic

Runways
Direction	Length		Surface
Direction	ft	m	Surface
07/25	6,562	2,000	Gravel
- Sources: Great Circle Mapper

Lensk Airport (Yakut: Лиэнскэй Аэропорт) (IATA: ULK, ICAO: UERL) is a public airport near Lensk in Sakha Republic. It works as focus city for Alrosa Mirny Air Enterprise.

== Airlines and destinations ==
Airlines	Destinations
Alrosa Mirny Air Enterprise	Irkutsk, Yakutsk
IrAero	Irkutsk
Polar Airlines	Irkutsk, Yakutsk
Yakutia Airlines	Bratsk, Irkutsk, Yakutsk

== Accidents and incidents ==
- On 4 July 2012, a helicopter operated by UTair Aviation for an oil and gas company crashed in a remote area about 4 kilometers from the runway of Lensk Airport. The wreckage was found several hours later and three bodies were recovered, with the fourth person also presumed killed. The cause was not immediately known, but UTair grounded all aircraft at Lensk Airport pending an investigation into the quality of fuel supply at the airport.

== See also ==
- List of airports in Russia
