= Komiavia =

Russian airline

Komiavia State Air Enterprise
IATA	ICAO	Call sign
-	-	-
- Commenced operations: 1991
- Ceased operations: August 1997
- Operating bases: Izhma Airport
- Fleet size: Tupolev Tu-134s, antonov An-24s and Yakovlev Yak-40s
- Headquarters: Komi Republic, Russia
- Key people: O. G. Chernov, M. V. Kutuzov

Concern Komiavia, later GAP Komiavia or Komiavia State Air Enterprise (Russian: Комиавиа) was a Russian airline.

This concern was founded in 1991 by O. G. Chernov. In 1991 Komiavia operated more than 320 airplanes and helicopters, including Mil Mi-8Ts, Mil Mi-10Ks and a number of civil airplanes.

It existed up to August 1992.

In December 1994 GAP Komiavia was founded by Chernov (December 1994 - February 1997, Chief Director).

Komiavia faded with the rise of UTair Aviation.

In April 1997 the Joint-stock company Komiinteravia was founded on the basis of Komiavia by M. V. Kutuzov.

GAP Komiavia losses increased and it finally went bankrupt, after which the company was transferred to the newly created GAP Komiaviatrans (or Komiaviatrans State Air Enterprise), based in Syktyvkar, Komi.

In May 1998 OJSC Komiinteravia reorganized by merging with Syktyvkar, a subsidiary of GAP Komiavia. It operated Tupolev Tu-134s, Antonov An-24s and Yakovlev Yak-40s.
