= Ust-Kut Airport =

Airport in Irkutsk Oblast, Russia

Ust-Kut Airport Аэропорт Усть-Кут
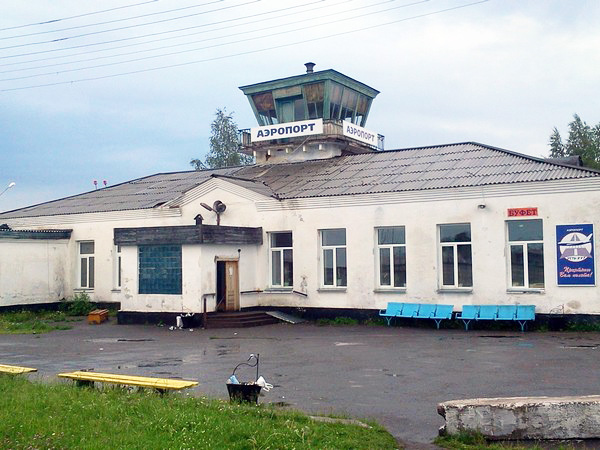
- IATA: UKX; ICAO: UITT; LID: УСК

Summary
- Airport type: Public
- Owner: Utair
- Operator: JSC «Aeroport Ust-Kut»
- Serves: Ust-Kut
- Location: Ust-Kut; Irkutsk Oblast; Russia
- Elevation AMSL: 2,188 ft (667 m)
- Coordinates: 56°51′29″N 105°43′46″E
- Website: uskairport.ru

Map
- Location within Irkutsk Oblast Location within Russia

Runways
| Direction | Length | | Surface |
| Direction | ft | m | Surface |
|---|---|---|---|
| 12/30 | 6,562 | 2,000 | Concrete |

Statistics (2018)
- Passengers: 90,026 (▲)
- Aircraft movements: 2,309 (▲)
- Servicing of cargo: 476 tons (▼)
- Sources: RU

Ust-Kut Airport (IATA: UKX, ICAO: UITT) is an airport in Irkutsk Oblast, Russia which is located 9 km north of Ust-Kut. It services short-haul routes and links the town to Irkutsk and Krasnoyarsk.

== Airlines and destinations ==
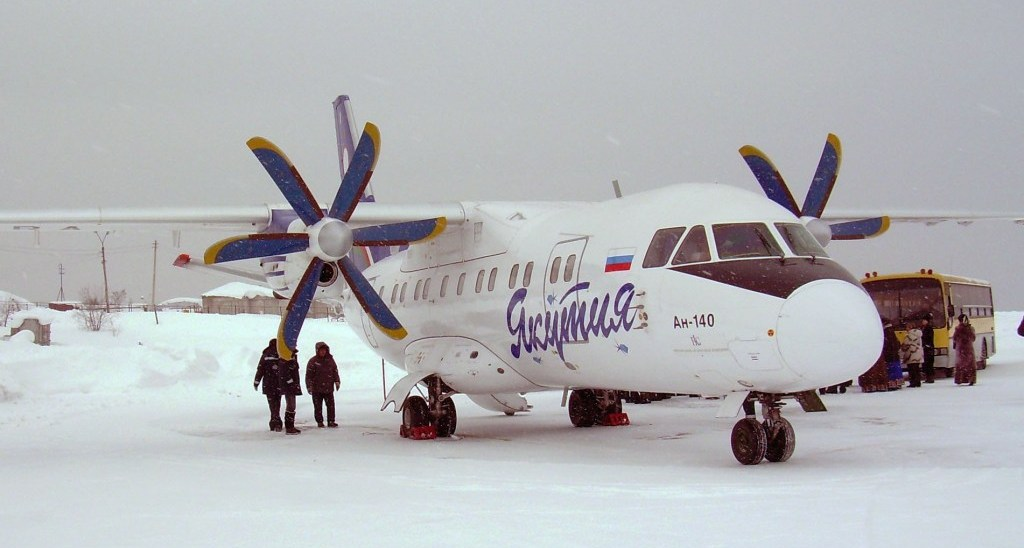
Antonov An-140 on the apron at Ust-Kut in 2007

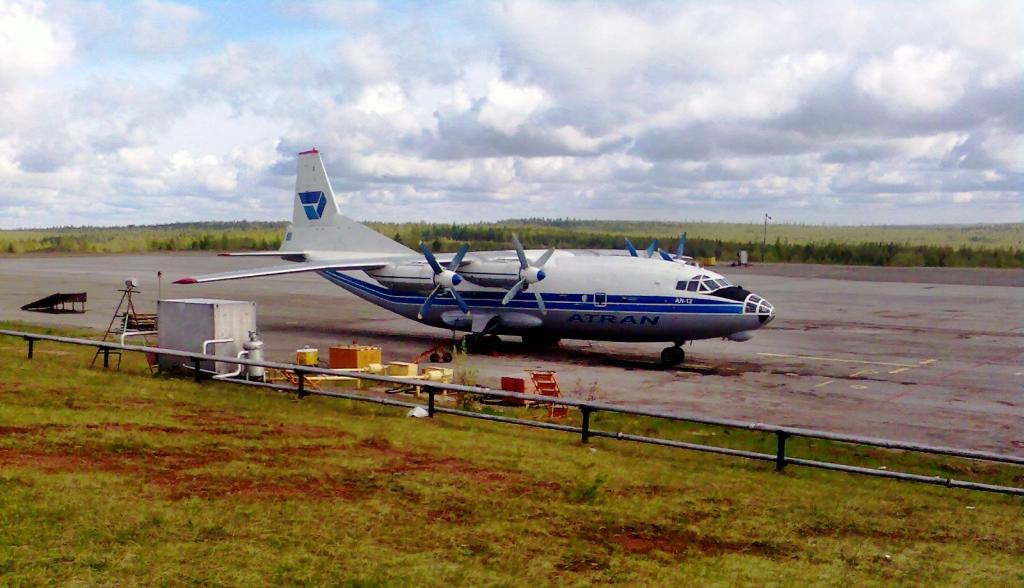
Antonov An-12 at Ust-Kut c. 2011

=== Passenger ===
| Airlines | Destinations |
|---|---|
| IrAero | Irkutsk |
| S7 Airlines | Novosibirsk (begins 1 December 2026) |
| Utair | Irkutsk |

=== Cargo ===
| Airlines | Destinations |
|---|---|
| UTair Cargo | Krasnoyarsk |

== Facilities ==
The airport is operational by schedule. A small airport terminal is able to service 50 passengers per hour, enough for operational needs.

The runway is equipped with an instrument landing system.

The airport can handle aircraft as large as the Antonov An-12 and Ilyushin Il-76.

== Accidents and incidents ==
- On 5 March 1970 a Lisunov Li-2 (registration CCCP-58340) of Aeroflot crashed after take-off due to shifting of cargo.
- On 17 December 1976 a Yakovlev Yak-40 (registration CCCP-88208) of Aeroflot struck trees, crashed and burst into flames. Aircrew errors and poor ground staff service led to an air disaster. All passengers and crew died.
- On 17 August 2022 an Antonov An-24 of Angara Airlines crash-landed, after its wingtip struck the runway surface during landing.

== See also ==
- List of airports in Russia
