= 2009 Mirny Il-76 crash =

Aviation incident in Russia

Coordinates: 62°32′47.9″N 114°0′46.6″E

2009 Mirny, Yakutia Ilyushin Il-76 crash
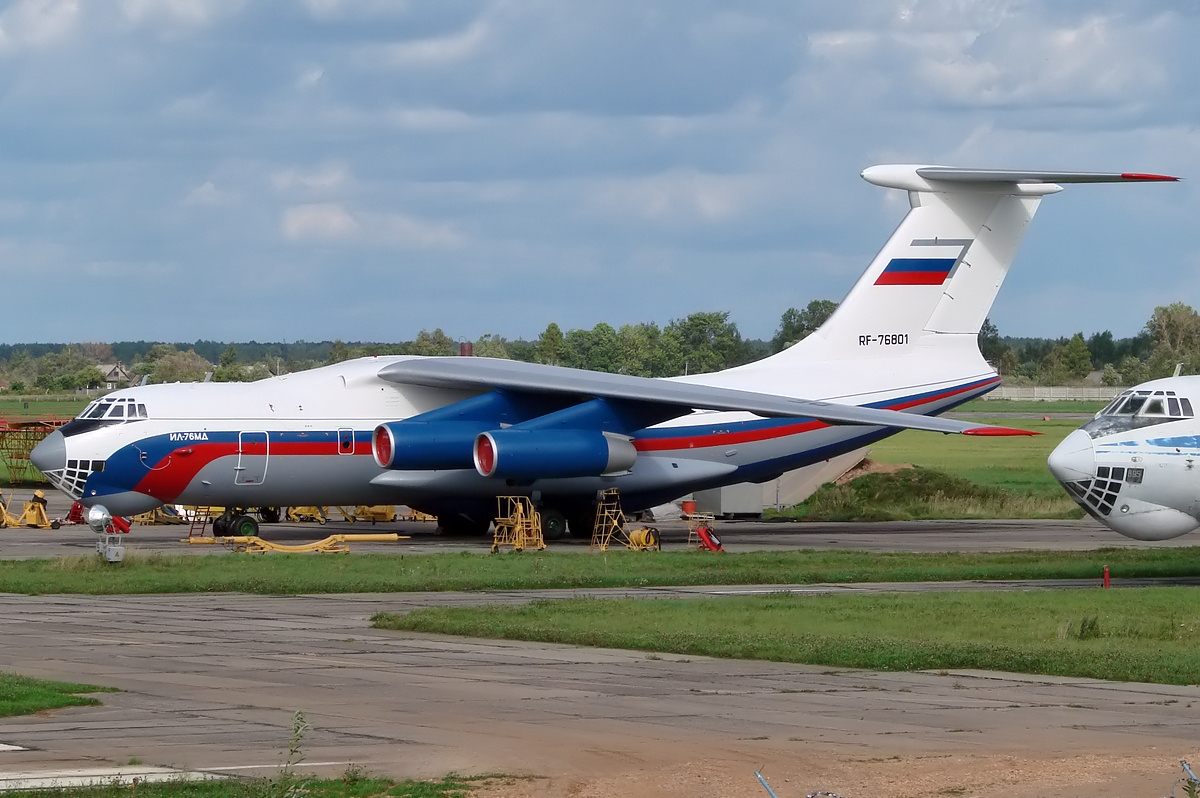
- RF-76801, the aircraft involved in the accident, in August 2007

Accident
- Date: 1 November 2009
- Summary: Crashed shortly after take-off
- Site: 25 km away from Mirny Airport

Aircraft
- Aircraft type: Ilyushin Il-76
- Operator: Russian Armed Forces
- Registration: RF-76801
- Flight origin: Mirny Airport
- Destination: Irkutsk Airport
- Occupants: 11
- Passengers: 4
- Crew: 7
- Fatalities: 11
- Survivors: 0

On 1 November 2009, an Ilyushin Il-76 operated by the Russian Armed Forces crashed shortly after takeoff from Mirny Airport in Yakutia, killing all 11 occupants on board.

== Chronology of events ==
The jet, owned by the Russian Ministry of Internal Affairs, took off, with eleven crewmembers on board, from Mirny Airport, where the onboard cargo had been unloaded. The aircraft was bound for the city of Irkutsk, when several minutes after liftoff it banked to the right, hit a slag heap from an old mine and crashed. It exploded on impact and caught fire, about three kilometres (1.9 mi; 1.6 nmi) from the airport in a deserted area. There are suggestions that the aircraft failed to gain altitude and deviated off its flight path.

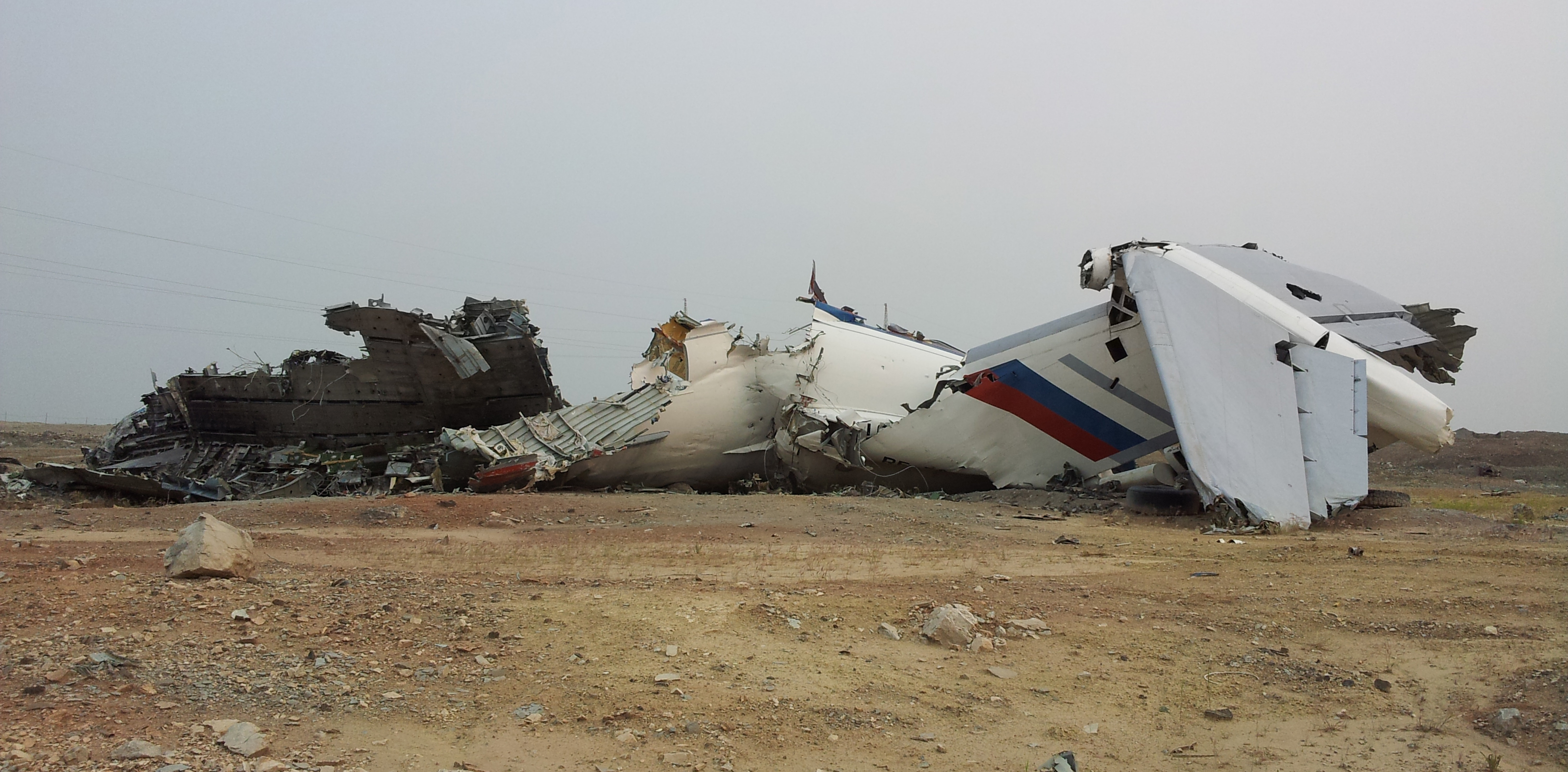
A Photo showing the Empennage after the crash

After the cargo was unloaded, the plane "took off but then deviated from the course and crashed 25 kilometres (16 mi; 13 nmi) away from the runway," an official from the Russian Emergencies Ministry told reporters. Reports suggest that in the days following the accident eleven bodies were pulled from the jet by rescuers.

Russia's air force had temporarily grounded all Il-76 aircraft after an engine broke off the wing of a plane while it was attempting to takeoff earlier that year. It was reported that the ban was still in place at the time of the accident, and it is not yet clear as to why the jet was used when the model had been grounded.

A special commission of the Russian Interior Ministry was assigned to investigate the cause of the accident.

The METAR in force at the time of the accident was UERR 312330Z 22005MPS CAVOK M24/M26 Q1030 NOSIG RMK QFE741 24450245=.
