= Mirny Airport =

Airport in Russia

Mirny Airport Yakut: Миэринэй Аэропорда Mièrinèï Aeroporta Russian: Аэропорт Мирный
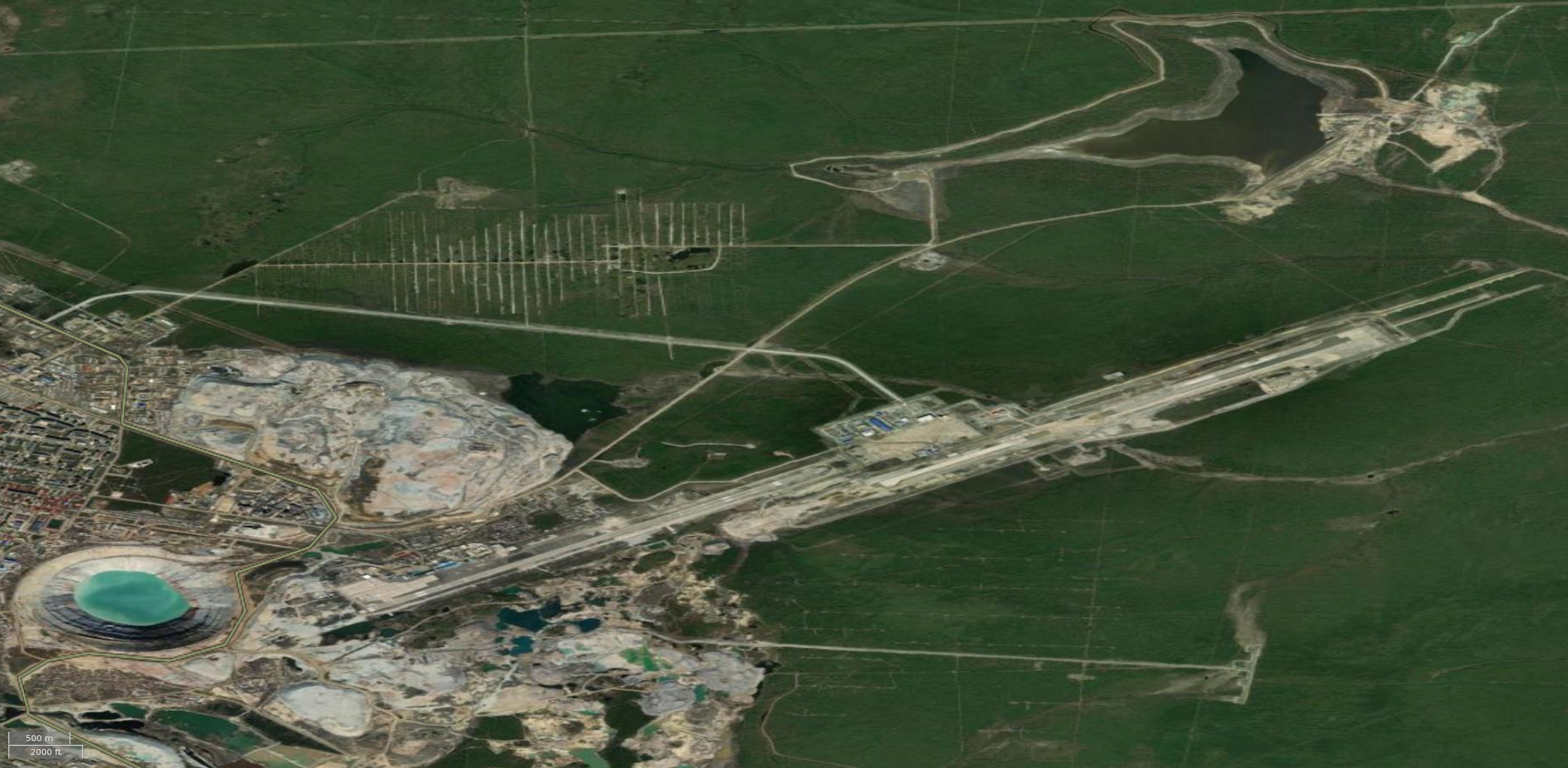
- Satellite imagery of Mirny Airport (east of the Mir mine)

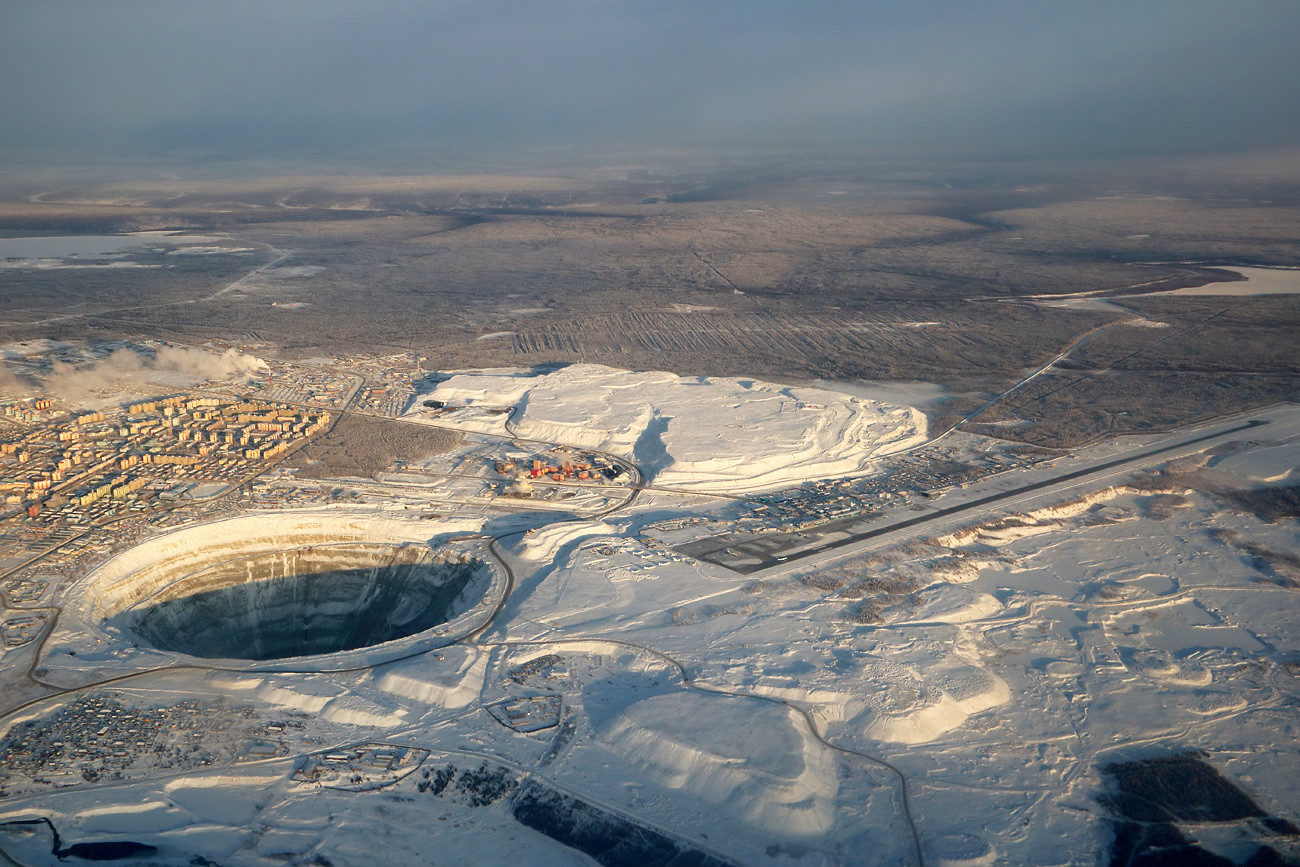
- IATA: MJZ; ICAO: UERR; LID: МИР

Summary
- Airport type: Public/Military
- Operator: Alrosa Mirny Air Enterprise
- Serves: Mirny, Sakha Republic, Russia
- Hub for: Alrosa Mirny Air Enterprise
- Elevation AMSL: 1,155 ft / 352 m
- Coordinates: 62°32′04″N 114°01′20″E

Maps
- Sakha Republic in Russia

- Location of the airport in the Sakha Republic

Runways
Direction	Length		Surface
Direction	ft	m	Surface
07/25	9,187	2,800	Concrete
- GCM, STV

Mirny Airport (Russian: Аэропорт Мирный; Yakut: Миэринэй Аэропорда, Mièrinèï Aeroporta) (IATA: MJZ, ICAO: UERR) is an airport in Yakutia, Russia, located 4 kilometres (2.5 mi) east of the mining town of Mirny. It handles medium-sized aircraft and supports 24-hour flight operations. Mirny airport serves as a diversion airport on Polar route 3. The airport is home base for Alrosa Mirny Air Enterprise. 329,446 passengers were transited by this airport in 2017.

The airport is home to the 17th Independent Transport Aviation Squadron of the Russian Aerospace Forces.

== Airlines and destinations ==
Airlines	Destinations
ALROSA	Irkutsk, Krasnodar, Krasnoyarsk–Yemelyanovo, Moscow–Domodedovo, Novosibirsk, Polyarny, Yakutsk, Yekaterinburg
NordStar	Krasnoyarsk–Yemelyanovo
S7 Airlines	Novosibirsk
Yakutia Airlines	Yakutsk; Seasonal: Khabarovsk

== Accidents and incidents ==
- On 1 November 2009, an Ilyushin Il-76 cargo jet of the Russian Ministry of Internal Affairs crashed shortly after take-off from Mirny airport, killing all 11 people on board. It was on a repositioning flight to Irkutsk Airport after delivering cargo to Mirny. The Il-76 banked to the right and crashed into the ground near the Mir mine.

== See also ==
- List of airports in Russia
- List of military airbases in Russia
