= Izhma Airport =

Airport in Komi, Russia

- IATA: none; ICAO: UUYV

Summary
- Airport type: Public
- Operator: Komiavia
- Location: Izhma
- Elevation AMSL: 230 ft / 70 m
- Coordinates: 65°01′54″N 53°58′12″E

Maps
- Komi Republic in Russia

- Airport in the Komi Republic

Runways
Direction	Length		Surface
Direction	ft	m	Surface
17/35	4,347	1,325	Concrete

Izhma Airport (Komi: Ижма Аэропорт, Russian: Аэропорт Ижма) (ICAO: UUYV) was an airport in Komi, Russia located 3 km northeast of Izhma. It formerly handled small aircraft (An-2, An-24, L-410, Yak-40, etc.) but was closed to airliners in 2003 and is now only used for helicopters.

== Accidents and incidents ==
- 7 September 2010: Alrosa Flight 514, operated by a Tupolev Tu-154, suffered a complete in-flight electrical failure while on a scheduled domestic flight from Udachny to Moscow. A successful emergency landing was made at Izhma, but the aircraft overran the runway and was damaged. All 81 people on board escaped uninjured. The aircraft was later repaired and returned to service. The positive outcome was partly due to the diligence of airport supervisor Sergey Sotnikov in keeping the runway clear of vegetation and debris even after the airport was closed to traffic in 2003. Sotnikov was later awarded the Medal of the Order "For Merit to the Fatherland" by the President of Russia.

== See also ==
- List of airports in Russia
