= International Airport Irkutsk =

International airport in Irkutsk, Russia

International Airport Irkutsk Международный Аэропорт Иркутск

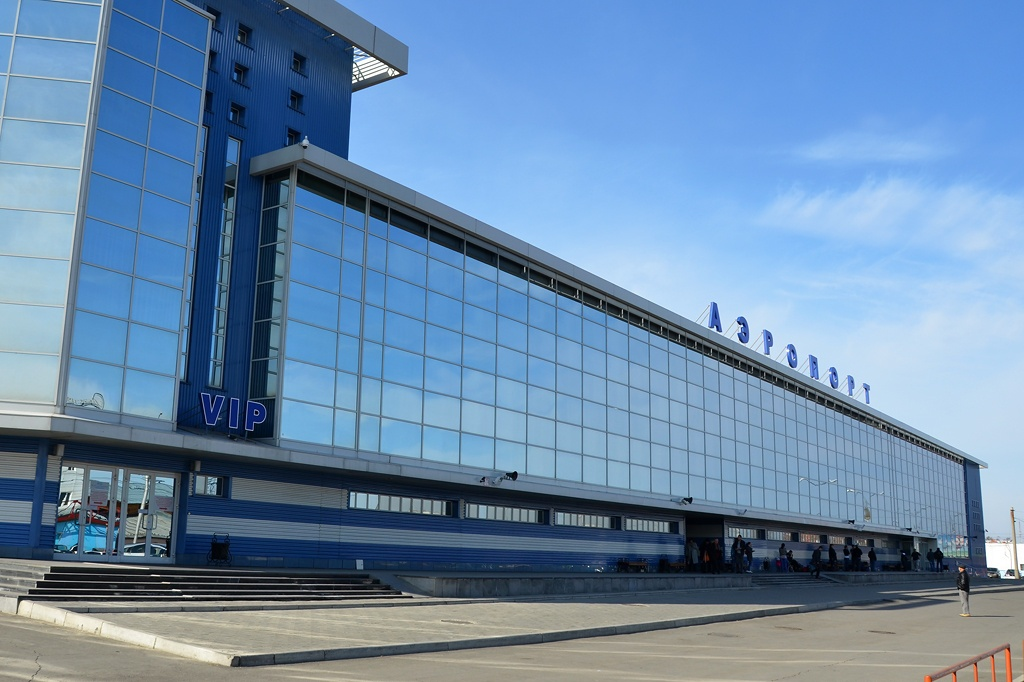
- IATA: IKT; ICAO: UIII; LID: ИКТ

Summary
- Airport type: Military / Public
- Owner: Russian Federation
- Operator: JSC "International Airport Irkutsk"
- Serves: Irkutsk
- Location: Irkutsk, Russia
- Hub for: Angara Airlines; IrAero
- Focus city for: Nordwind Airlines; S7 Airlines; Ural Airlines; Yakutia Airlines
- Time zone: +8 (UTC+08:00)
- Elevation AMSL: 1,675 ft (511 m)
- Coordinates: 52°16′05″N 104°23′20″E
- Website: iktport.ru/en/

Map
- Location of airport in Irkutsk Oblast IKT (Russia) IKT (Earth)

Runways
Direction	Length		Surface
Direction	ft	m	Surface
12/30	11,702	3,564	polymer asphalt concrete

Statistics (2018)
- Passengers: ▲2,213,000
- Servicing of cargo (in tons): ▲31,933

Irkutsk International Airport (Russian: Международный Аэропорт Иркутск) (IATA: IKT, ICAO: UIII) is an international airport on the outskirts of Irkutsk, Russia, at a distance of 60 kilometers (37 miles) from Lake Baikal.

== Operations ==
The airport has daily domestic flights to Moscow, Vladivostok, Krasnoyarsk, Novosibirsk, Yakutsk, Saint Petersburg, Yekaterinburg, and Sochi. It has regional daily flights to Ust-Kut, Bratsk, Bodaybo, Kirensk and other Russian cities.

Due to its proximity to the Angara Reservoir, the airport is subject to a microclimate of foggy weather. When the airport is closed due to bad weather conditions, Bratsk Airport, Ulan-Ude Airport, Irkutsk Northwest Airport, and Belaya (air base) serve as diversion airports.

== History ==
=== 1920s to 1930s ===
The Irkutsk Airport opened on 24 June 1925. Six aircraft from Moscow landed at the airport as part of a flight to Beijing. Of these six planes, four were domestic and two were foreign. This flight was headed by captain I.P. Shmidt. The event was the beginning of aviation service in Siberia.

On 10–13 August 1928 the first postal/passenger flight on the Irkutsk–Bodaybo seaplane route arrived. It was a Junkers F 13 named Mossovet. In August 1932 the air route from Moscow to Vladivostok opened with a stop in Irkutsk. Irkutsk aviators started to fly the Irkutsk to Mogocha route.

=== 1940s to 1960s ===
In January 1948, daily flights on the Irkutsk–Moscow, Irkutsk–Bodaybo–Yakutsk air routes were started. On December 30, 1954, Irkutsk Airport was elevated to international status.

On September 15, 1956, the Tupolev Tu-104 first arrived in Irkutsk by tech-flight from Beijing. The Moscow–Irkutsk route initiated that day marked the first Soviet jet-airliner-operated passenger route. The flight was performed by a Moscow crew headed by captain E.P. Barabash.

=== 1970s to 1990s ===
On March 7, 1975, the first Tupolev Tu-154 jets landed in Irkutsk. On April 4, 1975, the first flight to Moscow on Tupolev Tu-154 was performed.

On November 11, 1980, the first Il-76 CCCP-76525 arrived in Irkutsk. The crew consisted of: flight instructor МГА Mr. M. V. Ptitsyn, the commander УТО Mr. V. F. Podshivalov, captain-probationer A.V. Bobylkov and other flying experts. On December 19, 1980, the first flight was performed on the route Irkutsk–Polyarnyi using the Il-76. It was headed by air detachment commander Mr. v. I. Sviridov.

On April 1, 1992, according to order No. 238 d.d. 30 March, Irkutsk United Air Group was reorganized. There were Irkutsk Airport State Enterprise (SE "Irkutsk Airport") and Air company Baikal Public Corporation.

On October 28, 1994, certificate No. 045-А-М from the Intergovernmental Aviation Committee in accordance with certification requirements was given. The airport was accepted as suitable for international flights.

On December 16, 1994, the acting terminal of international flights was put into commission.

=== 2000s ===
International Airport Irkutsk held its first aircraft spotting session on November 13, 2009, becoming the third large city in Russia (after Moscow and Novosibirsk). The event has become a tradition.

On July 2, 2010, Irkutsk Airport celebrated its 85th anniversary.

== Technical characteristics ==
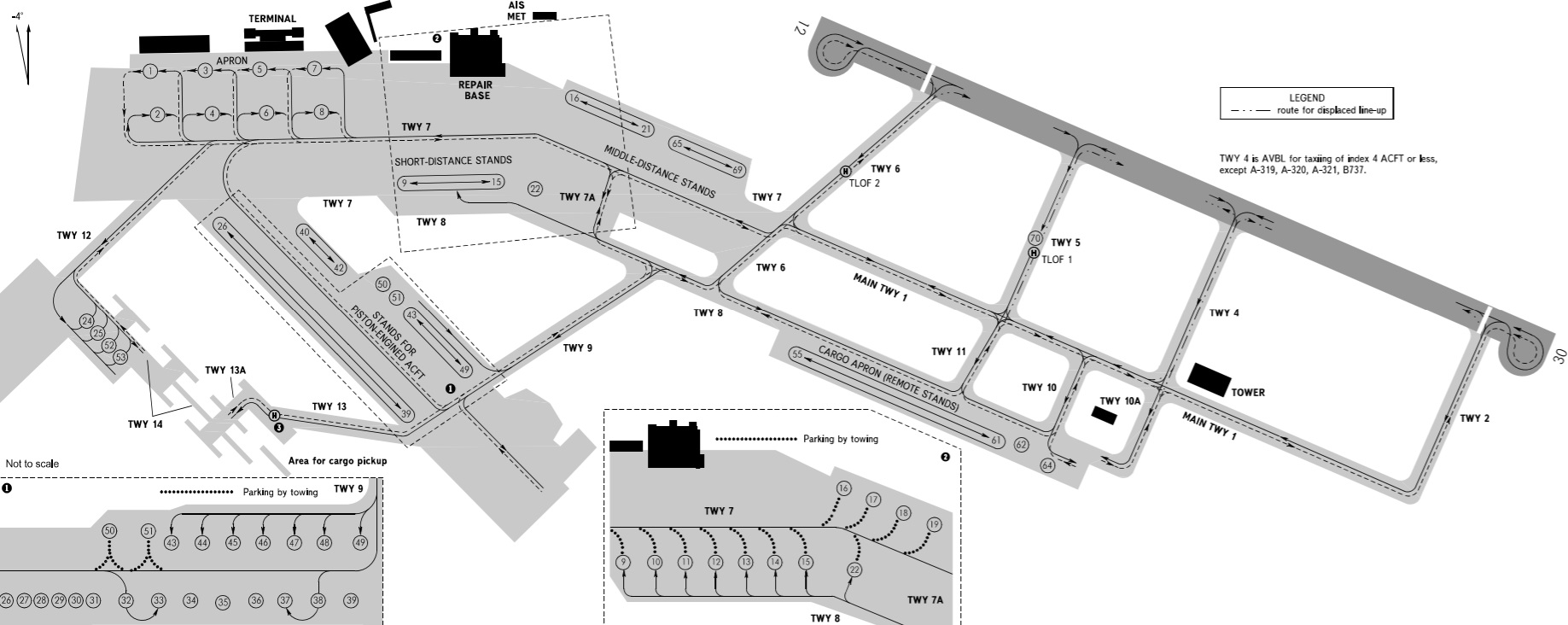
Aerodrome chart

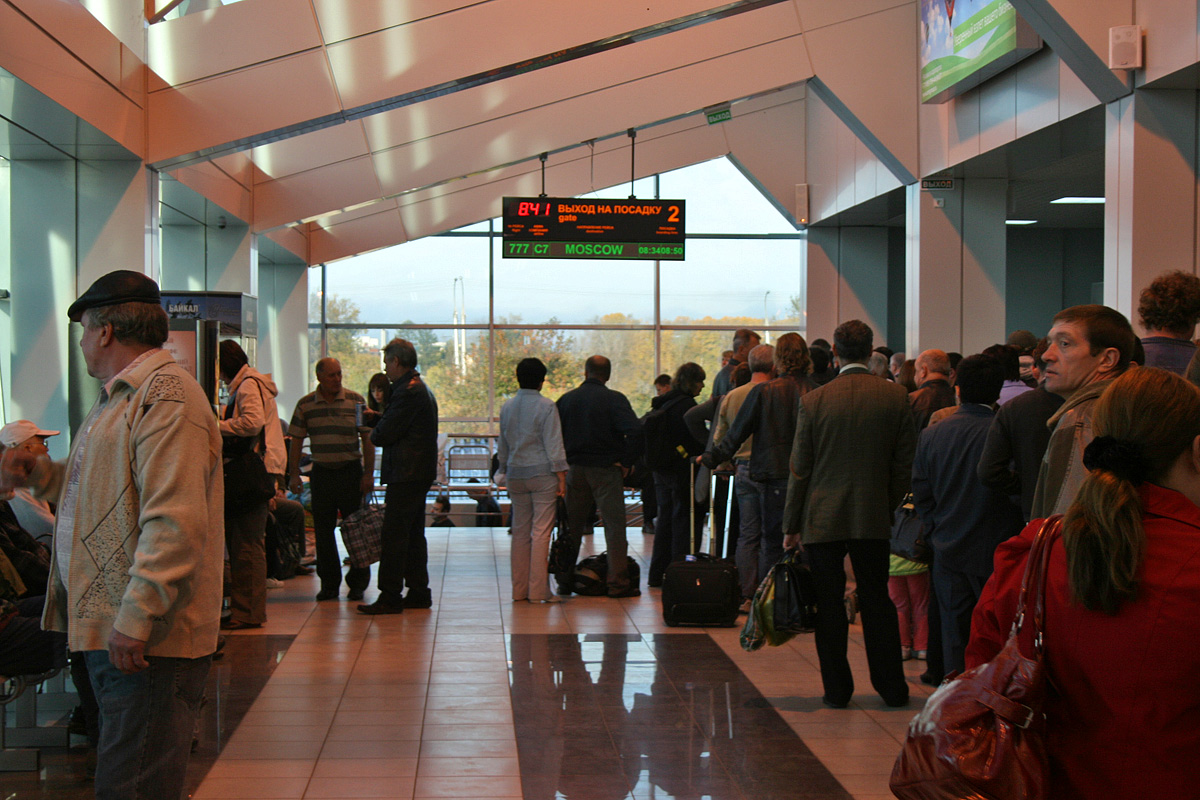
Gate in the International Airport Irkutsk.

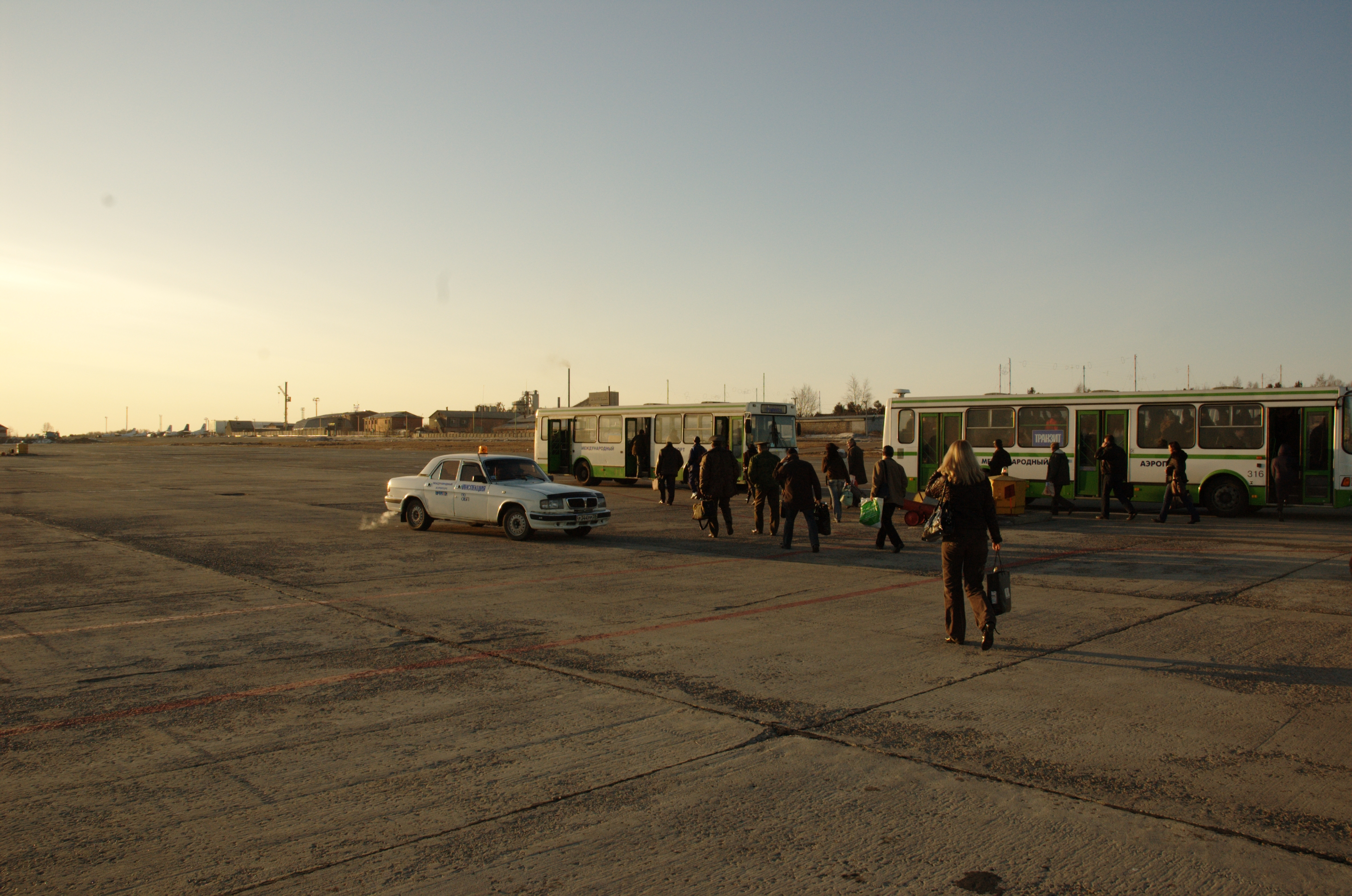
Apron buses at Irkutsk Airport.

International Airport Irkutsk has a rather unusual layout, with the passenger terminals being off the western end of the airfield's only runway, at an exact 270° heading. The airport's runway is coated with a substance known as armobetonnym, but is also rather steep, featuring a 30-metre vertical drop between the west and east runway ends. The total capacity of the two passenger terminals is 1,450 passengers per hour. The airport complex also includes the Air Harbour airport hotel, a service of aviation service (board food workshop) repair facility and medical services. There is a VIP lounge in the international terminal building.

Passenger capacity:

- Domestic terminal: 800 passengers/hour
- International terminal: 650 passengers/hour

Cargo terminal: area = 2.2 hectares with a capacity of 150 tonnes per day.

Fire fighting equipment: cat VIII

=== Runway characteristics ===
The class of the artificial landing strip - B (according to the length of the landing strip), corresponds to the first category of ICAO.

=== ETOPS Diversion airport ===
Irkutsk airport serves as a diversion airport for transcontinental flights and Polar route 2.

== Airlines and destinations ==
=== Passenger ===
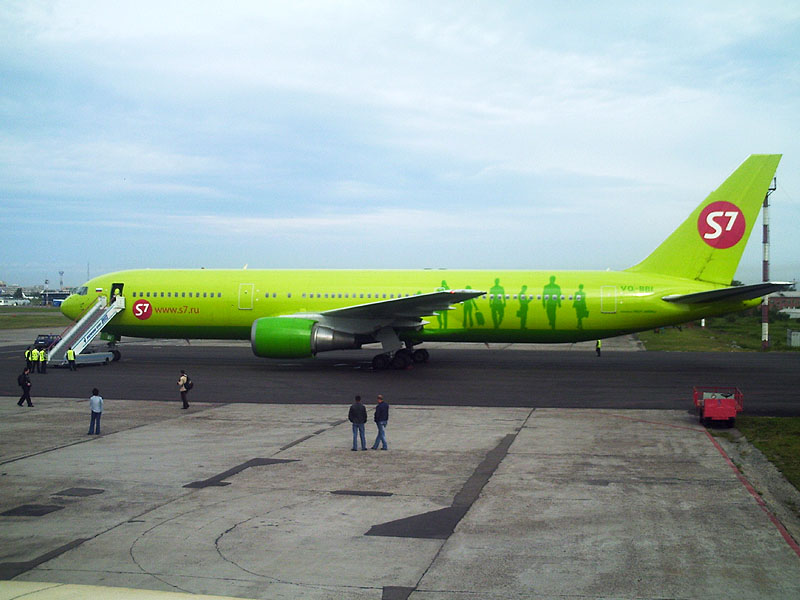
Boeing 767-300ER of S7 Airlines

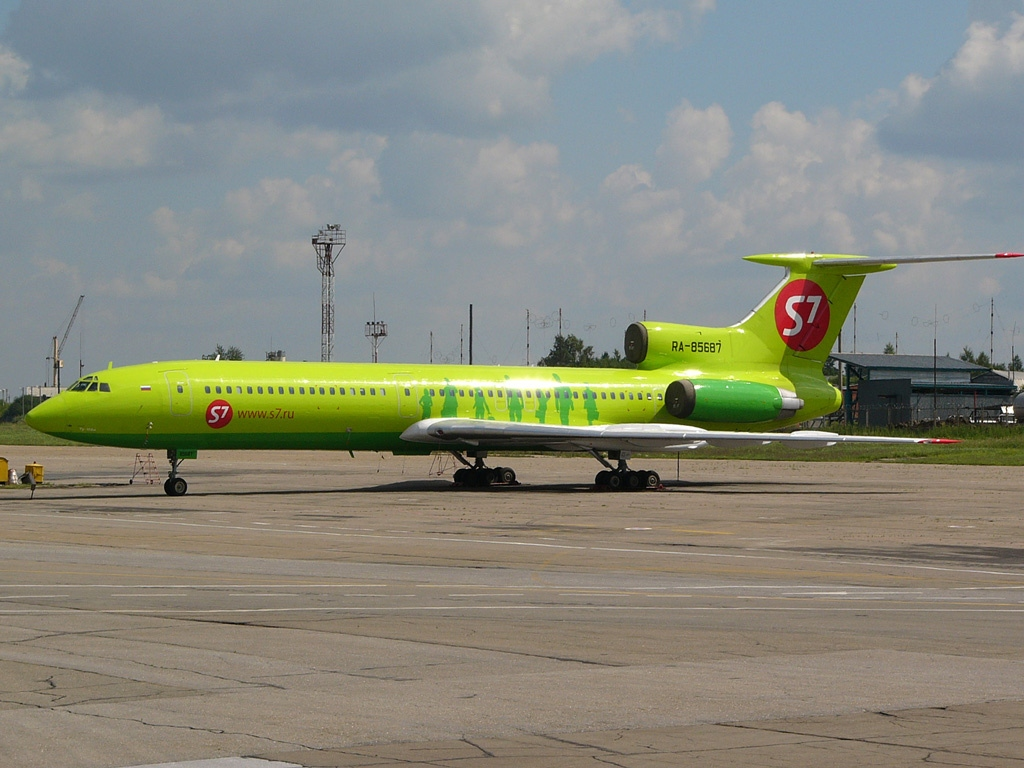
S7 Airlines Tupolev Tu-154M in new livery parked at Irkutsk Airport.

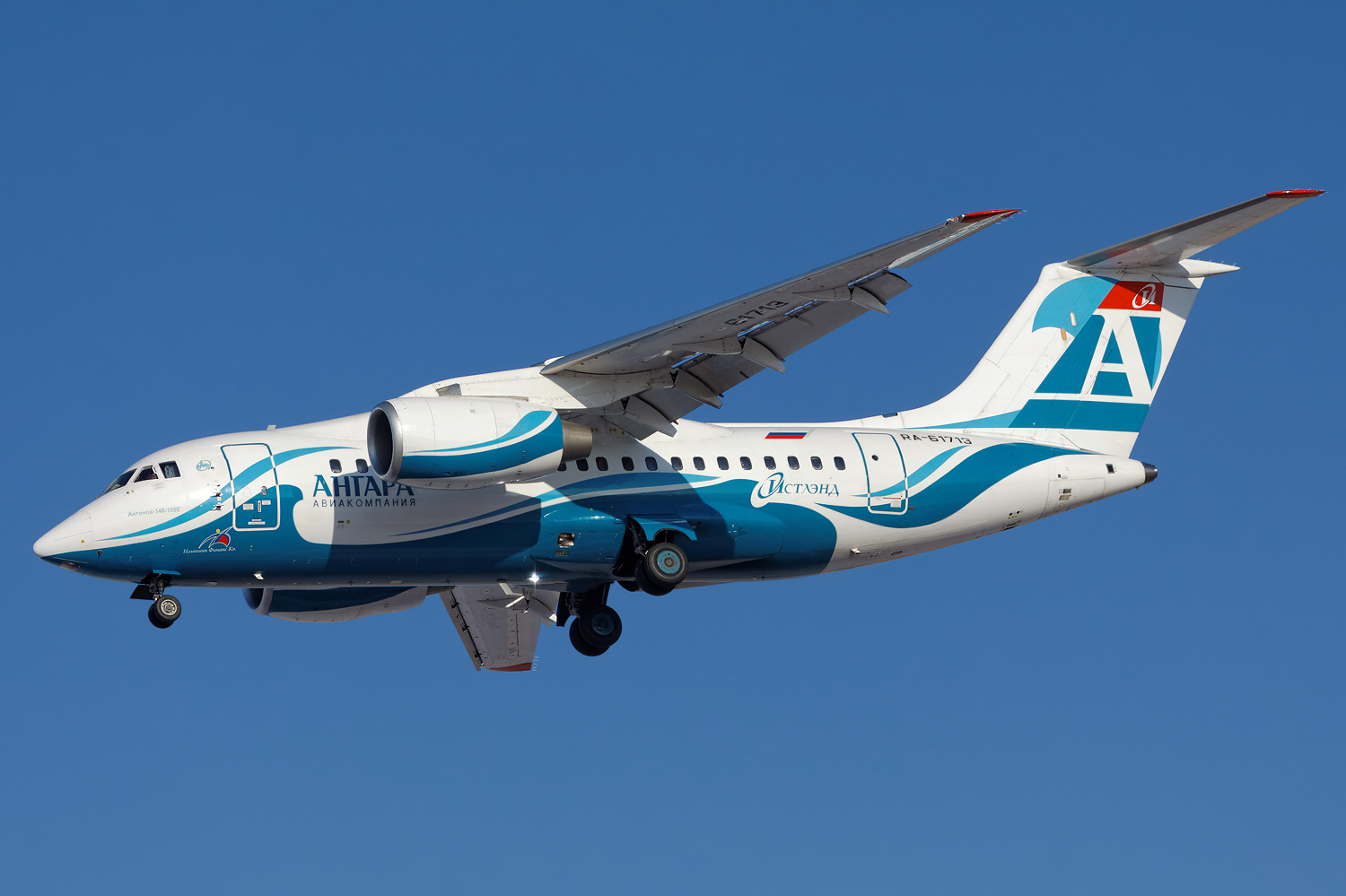
Angara Airlines Antonov An-148 landing at Irkutsk Airport.

Airlines	Destinations
Aeroflot	Bangkok–Suvarnabhumi, Moscow–Sheremetyevo, Sanya; Seasonal: Nha Trang, Phuket
Air China	Beijing–Capital
Alrosa	Mirny
Aurora	Khabarovsk
Avia Traffic Company	Osh
Azur Air	Seasonal charter: Nha Trang, Pattaya, Phuket
Hainan Airlines	Beijing–Capital
Ikar	Seasonal charter: Nha Trang, Phuket
IrAero	Blagoveshchensk, Bodaybo, Chara, Chita, Hanoi, Harbin, Lensk, Mama, Manzhouli, Mirny, Neryungri, Nha Trang, Novosibirsk, Olyokminsk, Polyarny, Talakan, Ulaanbaatar, Ulan-Ude, Ust-Kut; Seasonal: Abakan, Kalibo (resumes October 20 2026)
KrasAvia	Krasnoyarsk–International
NordStar	Novosibirsk, Ufa
Nordwind Airlines	Kazan
Pobeda	Moscow–Sheremetyevo
Red Wings Airlines	Novokuznetsk
Rossiya Airlines	Krasnoyarsk–International, Saint Petersburg
S7 Airlines	Andizhan, Bangkok–Suvarnabhumi, Beijing–Daxing, Gorno-Altaysk, Blagoveshchensk, Bratsk, Chita, Da Nang (begins 2 March 2027), Fergana, Guangzhou, Khabarovsk, Krasnoyarsk-International, Moscow–Domodedovo, Neryungri, Novosibirsk, Omsk, Osh, Pattaya, Petropavlovsk-Kamchatsky, Saint Petersburg, Sanya (begins 30 December 2026), Shanghai–Pudong, Sochi, Tyumen, Ufa, Ulaanbaatar (begins 15 December 2026), Ulan-Ude, Vladivostok, Yakutsk, Yekaterinburg, Yuzhno-Sakhalinsk, Seasonal: Phuket
SiLA	Kazachinskoye, Ust-Ilimsk
Ural Airlines	Dushanbe, Moscow–Domodedovo, Namangan, Osh, Tashkent, Yekaterinburg
Utair	Bratsk Krasnoyarsk–International, Tomsk, Ufa, Ust-Kut
Uzbekistan Airways	Namangan, Tashkent
VietJet Air	Seasonal charter: Nha Trang
Yakutia Airlines	Almaty, Yakutsk

=== Cargo ===
Airlines	Destinations
Volga-Dnepr Airlines	Kolkata

== Statistics ==
Busiest routes at International Airport Irkutsk (by number of passengers) 2015
Rank	Country	Region	City	Airport	Airlines	Number of passengers
1	Russia	Moscow / Moscow Oblast	Moscow	Moscow Domodedovo Airport, Sheremetyevo International Airport, Vnukovo International Airport	S7 Airlines, Ural Airlines, Aeroflot, Transaero	614,888
2	Russia	Novosibirsk Oblast	Novosibirsk	Novosibirsk Tolmachevo Airport	Angara, IrAero, NordStar, S7 Airlines	139,208
3	Thailand	Bangkok Metropolitan Region, Phuket Province	Bangkok, Phuket City	Suvarnabhumi Airport, Phuket International Airport	Azur Air, S7 Airlines, Pegas Fly	125,418
4	China	Municipality of Beijing	Beijing, Manzhouli, Harbin, Hong Kong	Beijing Capital Airport, Manzhouli Xijiao Airport, Harbin, Hong Kong Airport	Hainan Airlines, S7 Airlines	106,323
5	Russia	Khabarovsk Krai	Khabarovsk	Khabarovsk Novy Airport	Aurora Airlines, IrAero	76,340
6	Russia	Primorsky Krai	Vladivostok	Knevichi Airport	S7 Airlines, Ural Airlines	50,251

== Ground transport ==
The airport is located within the city limits. At the airport there are two paid parking areas: 180 spaces (near the international terminal) and 80 spaces (near the domestic airline terminal).

The air terminals are equipped with three stops for complex urban public transport. In addition, shuttle bus number 306 has a route to Angarsk which runs three times a day (2010 data).

== Periodical literature ==
The airport publishes its own regional industry newspaper, Irkutsk Sky, dedicated to civil aviation in the Irkutsk region. The publication contains interviews with the heads of airlines, an airline news column, and analytical materials. The newspaper is published bimonthly and distributed free in the airport terminals and the airlines' offices in Irkutsk.

== Accidents and incidents ==
- On 25 July 1971, Aeroflot Flight 1912 crashed after it touched down short of the runway. 97 of the 118 people on board perished in the crash.
- On 9 February 1976, Aeroflot Flight 3739 crashed shortly after takeoff. Of the 115 people on board, 24 perished in the accident.
- On 4 July 2001, Vladivostok Air Flight 352 rolled sharply, stalled and crashed whilst on approach into Irkutsk. All 145 people on board were killed.
- On 9 July 2006, S7 Airlines Flight 778 overshot the runway, and crashed through a concrete barricade, hit a group of private garages and burst into flames, killing 125 out 203 people on board. The only runway had to be closed, and incoming planes were diverted to the runway of the nearby Irkut aviation plant, where Sukhoi fighters and the Beriev Be-200 are produced.
- On 1 July 2016, an IL-76 belonging to the Ministry of Emergency Situations (EMERCOM) of the Russian Federation, which took off from International Airport Irkutsk, crashed in the early morning near Lake Baikal on its way to fight a forest fire in the area. All ten people on board were members of EMERCOM, and there were no survivors.

== See also ==
- List of the busiest airports in Russia
- List of the busiest airports in the former USSR
