= Polyarny Airport =

Polyarny Airport Полярнай аэропорт Polyarnay Aeroport
- IATA: PYJ; ICAO: UERP; LID: ПЛЯ

Summary
- Airport type: Public
- Operator: Alrosa Mirny Air Enterprise
- Serves: Udachny
- Location: Udachny, Russia
- Hub for: ALROSA
- Elevation AMSL: 1,670 ft / 509 m
- Coordinates: 66°25′0″N 112°3′0″E

Map
- Location of the airport in the Sakha Republic

Runways
Direction	Length		Surface
Direction	ft	m	Surface
17/35	10,170	3,100	Concrete

Polyarny Airport (Yakut: Полярнай аэропорт, romanized: Polyarnay aeroport; Russian: Аэропорт Полярный) (IATA: PYJ, ICAO: UERP) (also Udachnaya or Poliarny) is an airport in Yakutia, Russia, located 1 km west of Novy and about 12 km west of Udachny. It services all types of aircraft. The airfield is built on a 4000 x 190 m gravel base, with the first 100 m of runway unusable for takeoff. It is designated as an emergency airfield for cross-polar airline traffic between North America and Asia. The airport serves as base for regional airline ALROSA.

== Airlines and destinations ==
Airlines	Destinations
ALROSA	Mirny, Novosibirsk
IrAero	Irkutsk
KrasAvia	Seasonal: Krasnoyarsk-Cherenshanka
Rossiya Airlines	Krasnoyarsk–International

== See also ==
- List of airports in Russia
