= List of airports in Russia =

This is a list of airports in Russia (Russian Federation), sorted by location. As of September 2018, Russia had 227 operational airports registered by the Federal Air Transport Agency. This list includes airports in Crimea, which is claimed by Russia as part of the Southern Federal District, but recognized by most countries to be part of Ukraine.

Map of Russian federal districts

== List ==
Location	ICAO code	IATA code	Internal code	Airport name
=== Northwestern Federal District ===
Amderma	ULDD	AMV	АМД	Amderma Airport
Apatity	ULMK	KVK	АПХ	Kirovsk-Apatity Airport (Khibiny)
Arkhangelsk	ULAA	ARH	АХГ	Talagi Airport
Arkhangelsk	ULAH	VKV	ВСЬ	Vaskovo Airport
Cherepovets	ULWC	CEE	ЧРВ	Cherepovets Airport
Kaliningrad	UMKK	KGD	КЛД	Khrabrovo Airport
Murmansk	ULMM	MMK	МУН	Murmansk Airport
Naryan-Mar	ULAM	NNM	ННР	Naryan-Mar Airport
Petrozavodsk	ULPB	PES	ПТБ	Besovets Airport
Pskov	ULOO	PKV	ПСК	Pskov Airport
Saint Petersburg	ULLI	LED	ПЛК	Pulkovo Airport
Syktyvkar	UUYY	SCW	СЫВ	Syktyvkar Airport
Ukhta	UUYH	UCT	УХТ	Ukhta Airport
Usinsk	UUYS	USK	УСН	Usinsk Airport
Varandey	ULDW	VRI	ВРЙ	Varandey Airport
Velikiy Ustyug	ULWU	VUS	ВЕУ	Velikiy Ustyug Airport
Vologda	ULWW	VGD	ВГД	Vologda Airport
Vorkuta	UUYW	VKT	ВКТ	Vorkuta Airport
=== Central Federal District ===
Belgorod	UUOB	EGO	БЕД	Belgorod International Airport
Bryansk	UUBP	BZK	БРЯ	Bryansk International Airport
Ivanovo	UUBI	IWA	ИВВ	Ivanovo Yuzhny Airport
Kaluga	UUBC	KLF	КЛГ	Kaluga (Grabtsevo) Airport
Kostroma	UUBA	KMW	КОР	Kostroma Airport
Kursk	UUOK	URS	КУС	Kursk Vostochny Airport (Khalino)
Lipetsk	UUOL	LPK	ЛИП	Lipetsk Airport
Moscow	UUDD	DME	ДМД	Moscow Domodedovo Airport
Moscow	UUEE	SVO	ШРМ	Sheremetyevo International Airport
Moscow	UUWW	VKO	ВНК	Vnukovo International Airport
Moscow	UUBW	ZIA	РНУ	Zhukovsky International Airport (Ramenskoye)
Moscow	UUMO	OSF	ОСФ	Ostafyevo International Business Airport
Smolensk	UUBS	LNX	СМЛ	Smolensk North Airport
Stary Oskol	UUOS		СОЛ	Stary Oskol Airport
Tambov	UUOT	TBW	ТМБ	Tambov Donskoye Airport
Vladimir	UUBL	VLI	ВЛМ	Semyazino Airport
Voronezh	UUOO	VOZ	ВРН	Voronezh International Airport (Chertovitskoye)
Yaroslavl	UUDL	IAR	ЯРТ	Golden Ring Yaroslavl International Airport
=== Volga Federal District ===
Bugulma	UWKB	UUA	БУГ	Bugulma Airport
Buguruslan	UWWB		БГГ	Buguruslan Severny Airport
Cheboksary	UWKS	CSY	ЧБЕ	Cheboksary International Airport
Izhevsk	USII	IJK	ИЖВ	Izhevsk Airport
Kazan	UWKD	KZN	КЗН	Kazan International Airport
Kirov	USKK	KVX	КИО	Pobedilovo Airport
Nizhnekamsk/Naberezhnye Chelny	UWKE	NBC	НЖК	Begishevo Airport
Nizhny Novgorod	UWGG	GOJ	НЖС	Strigino International Airport
Orenburg	UWOO	REN	ОНГ	Orenburg Tsentralny Airport
Orsk	UWOR	OSW	ОСК	Orsk Airport
Penza	UWPP	PEZ	ПНА	Penza Airport
Perm	USPP	PEE	ПРЬ	Perm International Airport
Samara	UWWW	KUF	СКЧ	Kurumoch International Airport
Samara	UWWG		СБЫ	Bezymyanka Airport
Saransk	UWPS	SKX	СРН	Saransk Airport
Saratov	UWSG	GSV	ГСВ	Gagarinsky International Airport
Saratov	UWSS	RTW	СРО	Saratov Tsentralny Airport
Ufa	UWUU	UFA	УФА	Ufa International Airport
Ulyanovsk	UWLL	ULV	УЛК	Ulyanovsk Baratayevka Airport
Ulyanovsk	UWLW	ULY	УЛС	Ulyanovsk Vostochny Airport
Yoshkar Ola	UWKJ	JOK	ИШО	Yoshkar-Ola Airport
=== Southern Federal District ===
Anapa	URKA	AAQ	АНА	Vityazevo Airport
Astrakhan	URWA	ASF	АСР	Narimanovo Airport
Elista	URWI	ESL	ЭЛИ	Elista Airport
Gelendzhik	URKG	GDZ	ГДЖ	Gelendzhik Airport
Kerch	URFK	KHC	КРЧ	Kerch Airport
Krasnodar	URKK	KRR	КРД	Krasnodar International Airport
Rostov-on-Don	URRP	ROV	РОВ	Platov International Airport
Simferopol	URFF	SIP	СИП	Simferopol International Airport
Sochi	URSS	AER	АДЛ	Sochi International Airport
Taganrog	URRT	TGK	ТАГ	Taganrog South Airport
Volgograd	URWW	VOG	ВГГ	Volgograd International Airport (Gumrak)
Yeysk	URKE	EIK	ЕСК	Yeysk Airport
=== North Caucasian Federal District ===
Grozny	URMG	GRV	ГРН	Grozny Airport
Magas, Nazran	URMS	IGT	ИНШ	Magas Airport (Oskanov, Sleptsovskaya)
Makhachkala	URML	MCX	МХЛ	Uytash Airport
Mineralnye Vody	URMM	MRV	МРВ	Mineralnye Vody Airport
Nalchik	URMN	NAL	НЧК	Nalchik Airport
Stavropol	URMT	STW	СТВ	Shpakovskoye Airport
Vladikavkaz	URMO	OGZ	ВЛА	Beslan Airport
=== Ural Federal District ===
Beloyarsky	USHQ	EYK	БЛР	Beloyarsk Airport
Beryozovo	USHB	EZV	БЕР	Beryozovo Airport
Bovanenkovo gas field	USDB	BVJ	БОВ	Bovanenkovo Airport
Chelyabinsk	USCC	CEK	ЧЛБ	Balandino Airport
Igrim	USHI	IRM	ИРМ	Igrim Airport
Khanty-Mansiysk	USHH	HMA	ХАС	Khanty-Mansiysk Airport
Kogalym	USRK	KGP	КОГ	Kogalym Airport
Kondinskoye	USHK		КДН	Kondinskoye Airport
Kurgan	USUU	KRO	КГН	Kurgan Airport
Magnitogorsk	USCM	MQF	МГС	Magnitogorsk International Airport
Nadym	USMM	NYM	НДМ	Nadym Airport
Nizhnevartovsk	USNN	NJC	НЖВ	Nizhnevartovsk Airport
Novy Urengoy	USMU	NUX	НУР	Novy Urengoy Airport
Noyabrsk	USRO	NOJ	НОЯ	Noyabrsk Airport
Nyagan	USHN	NYA	НЯГ	Nyagan Airport
Sabetta	USDA	SBT	СБТ	Sabetta International Airport
Salekhard	USDD	SLY	СХД	Salekhard Airport
Sovetsky	USHS	OVS	СОЙ	Sovetsky Airport (Tyumenskaya)
Surgut	USRR	SGC	СУР	Farman Salmanov Surgut Airport
Tarko-Sale	USDS	TQL	ТКС	Tarko-Sale Airport
Tolka	USDO		ТЬК	Tolka Airport
Tyumen	USTR	TJM	РЩН	Roshchino International Airport
Tyumen	USTL		ПЛХ	Plekhanovo Airport
Uray	USHU	URJ	УРА	Uray Airport
Yamburg	USMQ		ЯМБ	Yamburg Airport
Yekaterinburg	USSS	SVX	КЛЦ	Koltsovo International Airport
=== Siberian Federal District ===
Abakan	UNAA	ABA	АБН	Abakan Airport
Barnaul	UNBB	BAX	БАН	Barnaul Airport (Mikhailovka)
Bodaybo	UIKB	ODO	БДБ	Bodaybo Airport
Bratsk	UIBB	BTK	БРС	Bratsk Airport
Chara	UIAR	CZR	ЧАР	Chara Airport
Chita	UIAA	HTA	СХТ	Kadala Airport
Erbogachen	UIKE	ERG	ЕГЧ	Erbogachen Airport
Gorno-Altaysk	UNBG	RGK	ГОР	Gorno-Altaisk Airport
Igarka	UOII	IAA	ИГР	Igarka Airport
Irkutsk	UIII	IKT	ИКТ	Irkutsk International Airport
Kemerovo	UNEE	KEJ	КРВ	Kemerovo Airport
Khatanga	UOHH	HTG	ХАТ	Khatanga Airport
Kirensk	UIKK	KCK	КРН	Kirensk Airport
Kodinsk	UNKI		КЗИ	Kodinsk Airport
Krasnoyarsk	UNKL	KJA	КЯА	Yemelyanovo Airport
Krasnoyarsk	UNKM	KCY	КЯС	Cheremshanka Airport
Kyzyl	UNKY	KYZ	КЫЫ	Kyzyl Airport
Mama	UIKM		МАМ	Mama Airport (Mamsky)
Nizhneangarsk	UIUN		НЖГ	Nizhneangarsk Airport
Norilsk	UOOO	NSK	НАК	Alykel Airport
Novokuznetsk	UNWW	NOZ	НВК	Spichenkovo Airport
Novosibirsk	UNNT	OVB	ТЛЧ	Tolmachevo Airport
Novosibirsk	UNNE		НВЦ	Yeltsovka Airport
Omsk	UNOO	OMS	ОМС	Omsk Tsentralny Airport
Podkamennaya Tunguska, Bor	UNIP	TGP	ПТС	Podkamennaya Tunguska Airport
Shushenskoye	UNAU		ШУШ	Shushenskoye Airport (Kazancevo)
Strezhevoy	UNSS	SWT	СТЖ	Strezhevoy Airport
Taksimo	UIKG		ТИО	Taksimo Airport
Tomsk	UNTT	TOF	ТСК	Bogashevo Airport
Turukhansk	UOTT	THX	ТРХ	Turukhansk Airport
Ulan-Ude	UIUU	UUD	УЛЭ	Baikal International Airport (Mukhino)
Ust-Kut	UITT	UKX	УСК	Ust-Kut Airport
Yeniseysk	UNII	EIE	ЕНС	Yeniseysk Airport
=== Far Eastern Federal District ===
Aldan	UEEA	ADH	АЛД	Aldan Airport
Anadyr	UHMA	DYR	АНЫ	Ugolny Airport
Ayan	UHNA		АЯН	Munuk Airport
Aykhal	UERA		АХЛ	Aykhal Airport
Batagay	UEBB	BQJ	БТГ	Batagay Airport
Belaya Gora	UESG	BGN	БЯГ	Belaya Gora Airport
Beringovsky	UHMR		БНГ	Beringovsky Airport
Blagoveshchensk	UHBB	BQS	БГЩ	Ignatyevo Airport
Bogorodskoye	UHNB	BQG	БГР	Bogorodskoye Airport
Chersky	UESS	CYX	ЧРС	Chersky Airport
Chokurdakh	UESO	CKH	ЧКД	Chokurdakh Airport
Chulman, Neryungri	UELL	NER	НРГ	Chulman Neryungri Airport
Chumikan	UHHY		ЧМИ	Chumikan Airport
Deputatsky	UEWD	DPT	ДЕП	Deputatsky Airport
Ekimchan	UHBP		ЭМП	Ekimchan Airport
Iturup	UHSI	ITU	ККУ	Iturup Airport
Keperveyem, Bilibino	UHMK	KPW	КПМ	Keperveyem Airport
Khabarovsk	UHHH	KHV	ХБР	Khabarovsk Novy Airport
Khandyga	UEMH	KDY	ХДЫ	Teply Klyuch Airport
Kherpuchi	UHNH		ХРП	Kherpuchi Airport
Khonuu	UEMA	MQJ	МОМ	Moma Airport
Komsomolsk-on-Amur	UHKK	KXK	КСЛ	Komsomolsk-on-Amur Airport (Khurba)
Kresta Bay	UHME		ЭГТ	Kresta Bay Airport
Kupol Gold Mine	UHEK	KPX	КУП	Kupol Airport
Lavrentiya	UHML		ЗЛА	Lavrentiya Airport
Lensk	UERL	ULK	ЛСК	Lensk Airport
Magadan	UHMM	GDX	МДС	Sokol Airport
Magan	UEMM	GYG	МГН	Magan Airport
Markovo	UHMO	KVM	МКО	Markovo Airport
Milkovo	UHPM		МЛК	Milkovo Airport
Mirny	UERR	MJZ	МИР	Mirny Airport
Nikolayevsk-on-Amur	UHNN	NLI	НЛК	Nikolayevsk-on-Amur Airport
Nikolskoye	UHPX		НИК	Nikolskoye Airport
Nogliki	UHSN	NGK	НГЛ	Nogliki Airport
Nyurba	UENN	NYR	НЮР	Nyurba Airport
Okha	UHSH	OHH	ОХА	Okha Airport
Okhotsk	UHOO	OHO	ОХТ	Okhotsk Airport
Olenyok	UERO	ONK	ОЛН	Olenyok Airport
Olyokminsk	UEMO	OLZ	ОЛК	Olyokminsk Airport
Omolon	UHMN		ООЛ	Omolon Airport
Omsukchan	UHMF		ОСУ	Omsukchan Airport
Ossora	UHPD		ОСО	Ossora Airport
Ozernaya	UHQO		ОЗР	Ozernaya Airport
Pakhachi	UHPA		ПАЧ	Pakhachi Airport
Palana	UHPL		ПАН	Palana Airport
Petropavlovsk-Kamchatsky	UHPP	PKC	ПРЛ	Yelizovo Airport
Pevek	UHMP	PWE	ПЕВ	Pevek Airport
Provideniya	UHMD	PVS	ПРД	Provideniya Bay Airport
Sakkyryr / Batagay-Alyta	UEBS	SUK	СКЫ	Sakkyryr Airport
Sangar	UEMS		САГ	Sangar Airport
Saskylakh	UERS	SYS	СЫХ	Saskylakh Airport
Severo-Evensk	UHMW	SWV	СВЕ	Severo-Evensk Airport
Seymchan	UHMS		СМЧ	Seymchan Airport
Shakhtyorsk	UHSK	EKS	ШАХ	Shakhtyorsk Airport
Srednekolymsk	UESK	SEK	СРМ	Srednekolymsk Airport
Suntar	UHPS		СУН	Suntar Airport
Talakan oil field, Vitim	UECT	TLK	ТЛК	Talakan Airport (Vitim)
Tigil	UHPG		ТИГ	Tigil Airport
Tiksi	UEST	IKS	ТСИ	Tiksi Airport
Tilichiki	UHPT		ТИЛ	Tilichiki Airport
Tynda	UHBW	TYD	ТЫД	Tynda Airport
Udachny	UERP	PYJ	ПЛЯ	Polyarny Airport (Udachnaya)
Ust-Kamchatsk	UHPK		УКЧ	Ust-Kamchatsk Airport
Ust-Kuyga	UEBT	UKG	УКУ	Ust-Kuyga Airport
Ust-Maya	UEMU	UMS	УСМ	Ust-Maya Airport
Ust-Nera	UEMT	USR	УНР	Ust-Nera Airport
Verkhnevilyuysk	UENI	VHV	ВХВ	Verkhnevilyuysk Airport
Vilyuisk	UENW	VYI	ВИК	Vilyuisk Airport
Vladivostok	UHWW	VVO	ВВО	Vladivostok International Airport
Yakutsk	UEEE	YKS	ЯКТ	Yakutsk Airport
Yuzhno-Kurilsk	UHSM	DEE	ЮЖК	Yuzhno-Kurilsk Mendeleyevo Airport
Yuzhno-Sakhalinsk	UHSS	UUS	ЮЖХ	Yuzhno-Sakhalinsk Airport (Khomutovo)
Zeya	UHBE	EYA	ЗЕЯ	Zeya Airport
Zhigansk	UEVV	ZIX	ЖИГ	Zhigansk Airport
Zyryanka	UESU	ZKP	ЗНК	Zyryanka Airport
=== Unregistered ===
Achinsk	UNKS	ACS		Achinsk Airport
Bagdarin				Bagdarin Airport
Balabanovo	UUWE			Yermolino Airport (Borovsk)
Balakovo	UWSB	BWO		Balakovo Airport
Baley				Baley Airport
Baikit	UNIB			Baikit Airport
Bereznik				Semenovskoye Shidrovo Airport
Biysk	UNBI			Biysk Airport
Boguchany	UNKB			Boguchany Airport
Ceremukhovo	USSE			Severouralsk Airport
Chaybukha	UHMG			Chaybukha Airport
Chistopol	UWKI			Chistopol Airport
Dikson	UODD	DKS		Dikson Airport
Dudinka	UROD			Dudinka Airport
Inta	UUYI	INA		Inta Airport
Izhma	UUYV			Izhma Airport
Kaliningrad				Kaliningrad Devau Airport
Kazachinsk	UITK			Kazachinsk Airport
Kazan	UWKG			Borisoglebskoye Airfield
Kerch	URFK	KHC		Kerch Airport
Kimry	UUEI			Kimry Airport
Kolomna	UUMT			Tretyakovo Aerodrome (Lukhovitsy)
Kolpashevo	UNLL			Kolpashevo Airport
Kotlas	ULKK	KSZ		Kotlas Airport
Kozyrevsk	UHPO			Kozyrevsk Airport
Krasnokamensk	UIAE			Krasnokamensk Airport
Krasnovishersk				Krasnovishersk Airport
Kyren				Kyren Airport
Kyzyl-Syr	UENK			Kyzyl-Syr Airport
Leshukonskoye	ULAL	LDG		Leshukonskoye Airport
Magadan	UHMT			Magadan-13 Airport
Menzelinsk	UWKP			Menzelinsk Airport
Mezen	ULAE			Mezen Airport
Moscow	UUBB	BKA		Bykovo Airport (closed)
Moscow				Khodynka Aerodrome (closed)
Moscow	UUBM			Myachkovo Airport
Neftekamsk	UWUF	NEF		Neftekamsk Airport
Nefteyugansk	USRN	NFG		Nefteyugansk Airport (closed)
Nikolsk				Nikolsk Airport
Norilsk	UOOW			Valek Airport
Novosibirsk	UNCC			Severny Airport (closed)
Oktyabrsky	UWUK	OKT		Oktyabrsky Airport
Oryol	UUOR	OEL		Oryol Yuzhny Airport (closed)
Pechora	UUYP	PEX		Pechora Airport
Plesetsk				Plestsy Airport
Raduzhny	USNR	RAT		Raduzhny Airport (closed)
Rostov on Don	URRR	RVI		Rostov-on-Don Airport (closed)
Rubtsovsk	UNBR			Rubtsovsk Airport
Ryazan	UUWR	RZN		Ryazan Turlatovo Airport
Rybinsk	UUBK	RYB		Rybinsk Staroselye
Saint Petersburg	ULSS	RVH		Rzhevka Airport (closed)
Sarmany				Sarmany Airport
Sarov	XUDM			Sarov Airport
Severo-Eniseysk	UNIS			Severo-Eniseysk Airport
Shimanovsk				Shimanovsk Airport
Sibay	UWUA			Sibay Airport
Simferopol	URFW			Zavodskoe Airport
Smolensk				Smolensk South Airport (closed)
Snezhnogorsk	UOIC			Snezhnogorsk Airport
Solikamsk	USPT			Berezniki Airport
Solovetsky Islands	ULAS	CSH		Solovki Airport
Staraya Russa	ULNR			Staraya Russa Airport
Susuman	UHMH			Susuman Airport
Svetlogorsk	UOIG			Svetlogorsk Airport
Svobodny	UHBS			Svobodny Airport
Syktyvkar				Syktyvkar Southwest Airport (abandoned)
Tarnogsky Gorodok				Tarnogsky Gorodok Airport
Tasayevo				Tasayevo Airport
Tura	UNIT			Tura Airport
Uka				Uka Airport
Ulan-Ude	UIUW			Ulan-Ude Vostochny Airport
Ust-Ilimsk	UIBS	UIK		Ust-Ilimsk Airport
Ust-Tsylma	UUYX			Ust-Tsylma Airport
Vanavara	UNIW			Vanavara Airport
Velikiy Novgorod	ULNN	NVR		Yurievo Airport (closed)
Velikiye Luki	ULOL	VLU		Velikiye Luki Airport (closed)
Verkhnyaya Toyma				Verkhnyaya Toyma Airport
Vuktyl	UUYK			Vuktyl Airport
Vyazma				Vyazma Airport
Yelabuga				Yelabuga North
Yekaterinburg	USSK			Uktus Airport (former Aramil air base, closed)
Yugarenok				Yugarenok Airport
Zheleznogorsk	UIBV			Zheleznogorsk Airport
Zyryanka				Zyryanka West Airport (closed)

== Military airfields ==
Location	Oblast	ICAO	IATA	Airport name	Units
Bagerovo				Bagerovo (air base)	
Chita Oblast				Bezrechnaya-2	
Chelyabinsk		USCG		Chelyabinsk Shagol Airport	
Chukotka		UHMI		Mys Shmidta Airport	
Dolinsk				Dolinsk-Sokol (air base)	
Iturup		UHSB	BVV	Burevestnik Airport	
Ivanovo				Ivanovo Severny (air base)	
Khatanga				Sredny Ostrov Airfield	
Klyuchi				Klyuchi (air base)	
Komsomolsk-on-Amur		UHKD		Dzyomgi Airport	
Kubinka		UUMB		Kubinka (air base)	
Lenino				Lenino (air base) (closed)	
Magdagachi		UHBI	GDG	Magdagachi Airport	
Moscow		UUMU	CKL	Chkalovsky Airport	
Nerchinsk				Nerchinsk Airport	
Nizhny Tagil				Salka Airport	
Pechora				Pechora Kamenka (air base)	
Perm		USPB		Bakharevka Airport	
Pugachyov				Pugachev (air base)	
Rzhev				Rzhev (air base)	
Saint Petersburg				Levashovo (air base)	
Saint Petersburg		ULLP		Pushkin Airport	
Samara				Samara Kryazh Airport	
Saratov				Saratov South	
Saratov				Saratov West	
Saratov				Tatishchevo (air base)	
Smirnykh				Smirnykh (air base) (closed)	
Taganrog				Taganrog-Central (air base)	
Tiksi				Tiksi West	
Tver		UUEM	KLD	Migalovo (air base)	
Yaroslavl				Yaroslavl Levtsovo (air base)	
Yevpatoria		URFE		Yevpatoria Airport	
Yugorsk				Yugorsk Sovetsky (air base) (closed)	

== See also ==
- Transport in Russia
- List of the busiest airports in Russia
- List of airports by ICAO code: U#U – Russia (Russian Federation)
- Wikipedia: WikiProject Aviation/Airline destination lists: Europe#Russian Federation
