= Begishevo Airport =

Airport in Nizhnekamsk, Tatarstan, Russia

Begishevo Airport Бегишево Халыкара Аэропорты
- IATA: NBC; ICAO: UWKE

Summary
- Airport type: Public
- Operator: OAO Begishevo Airport
- Serves: Nizhnekamsk, Naberezhnye Chelny, Yelabuga
- Location: Nizhnekamsk, Russia
- Elevation AMSL: 643 ft / 196 m
- Coordinates: 55°33′48″N 52°5′42″E
- Website: nbc.aero/

Map
- Location of airport in Tatarstan

Runways
Direction	Length		Surface
Direction	ft	m	Surface
04/22	8,166	2,489	Asphalt

Statistics (2018)
- Passengers: 777,263
- Sources: Russian Federal Air Transport Agency (see also provisional 2018 statistics)

Begishevo Airport (Tatar: Бегишево Халыкара Аэропорты, Russian: Аэропорт Бегишево) (IATA: NBC, ICAO: UWKE) is an airport in Russia located 19 km east of Nizhnekamsk, Tatarstan. It has a very large apron and a number of hangars and buildings.

== History ==
The construction of Begishevo airport started in 1970 on initiative of Nizhnekamskneftekhim. A first, technical flight was effected on 25 December 1971 on an An-24 airplane. Regular flights within Tatarstan (Kazan, Chistopol, Muslyumovo, Aktanysh, Yelabuga) started in 1972. During the next few years, Begishevo Airport established connections with the main cities of European Russia, Ukraine and Georgia. The airport obtained international status in 1998. In 2008, it became independent from Tatarstan Airlines as OAO Begishevo Airport. 99.95% of its shares belong to OAO KAMAZ (as of 30 June 2011).

== Airlines and destinations ==
Airlines	Destinations
Aeroflot	Moscow–Sheremetyevo
Azimuth	Mineralnye Vody, Nizhnevartovsk
Ikar	Makachkala
Nordwind Airlines	Sochi
Pobeda	Moscow–Sheremetyevo, Saint Petersburg; Seasonal: Sochi
Red Wings Airlines	Novy Urengoy
Rossiya	Moscow–Sheremetyevo
UVT Aero	Tashkent, Tobolsk

== See also ==
- List of airports in Russia
