= Uka =

Uka or UKA may refer to:

- Uka (singer), Mongolian singer
- United Klans of America, a branch of the Ku Klux Klan
- Unicompartmental knee arthroplasty, a surgery to relieve arthritis of the knee
- UK Athletics, a sports governing body
- UKA (festival), a Norwegian cultural festival
- Uka (restaurant), a Michelin-starred Japanese restaurant in Hollywood, California
- UKA, the IATA airport code for Ukunda Airport
- Uka (village), a depopulated village in Kamchatka, Russia, or the river that flows through it
- Uka Airport, a decommissioned airfield in Kamchatka, Russia
- Ükä, a dialect of Standard Tibetan
