= Valyok Airport =

- IATA: none; ICAO: UOOW

Summary
- Airport type: Unknown
- Operator: JSC "Taimyr Air Company"
- Location: Norilsk
- Elevation AMSL: 108 ft (33 m)
- Coordinates: 69°23′42″N 88°21′18″E
- Interactive map of Valyok Airport

Runways
Direction	Length		Surface
Direction	ft	m	Surface
13/31	5,085	1,550	Asphalt

Valyok Airport (Russian: Аэропорт "Валёк" (Note: The name comes from the Wussian name for freshwater whitefish)) (ICAO: UOOW) is a small airport in Krasnoyarsk krai, Russia located 9 km northeast of Norilsk along the Valkovskoye highway (Russian: Вальковское шоссе). The Norilsk river's western bank is where the runway is located. The nearby Valk river, a tributary of the Norilsk river, inspired the airport's name.

== History ==
Beginning in 1950 to support the industrial giant now known as Norilsk Nickel, the Nadezhda Airport (Russian: аэропорт «Надежда») began as a Class 3 facility in the Civil Air Fleet with a Seaplane Base "Valyok".

Small planes, such as the AN-2, AN-3, and similar types, and helicopters of all types are serviced at Valёk. The Taimyr Air Company (Russian: АК Таймыр) services AN-2, AN-3, Mi-8 T (Mil Mi-8), and Mi-8 MTV-1 Line (Mil Mi-17).

Both Taymyr Air Company and NordStar are subsidiaries of Norilsk Nickel. On December 1, 2011, Norilsk Nickel announced that Taimyr Air Company will be merged with NordStar.

Nearest airports and the distance to them:

- Alykel - 41.2 km
- Dudinka - 86.0 km
- Snezhnogorsk - 150.0 km

== See also ==
- List of airports in Russia
