= Dudinka (disambiguation) =

Dudinka is a town in Krasnoyarsk Krai, Russia.

Dudinka may also refer to:

- Dudinka Urban Settlement, a municipal formation which the district town of Dudinka in Taymyrsky Dolgano-Nenetsky District of Krasnoyarsk Krai, Russia is incorporated as
- Dudinka (inhabited locality), several inhabited localities in Russia
- Dudinka Airport (UROD), an airport in Krasnoyarsk Krai, Russia
- Dudinka River, a river in Russia
