= Taskayevo =

Taskayevo may refer to:

- Taskayevo, name of several rural localities in Russia
- Taskayevo, name of Zdvinsk in 1773–1896
- stantsii Taskayevo, a settlement in Kemerovo Oblast, Russia

== See also ==
- Taskayeva
- Tasayevo Airport
- Taseyevo
