= Milkovo Airport =

Milkovo Airport Аэропорт Мильково
- IATA: none; ICAO: UHPM; LID: МЛК

Summary
- Airport type: Public
- Location: Milkovo
- Elevation AMSL: 410 ft / 125 m
- Coordinates: 54°40′42″N 158°32′42″E
- Interactive map of Milkovo Airport

Runways
Direction	Length		Surface
Direction	ft	m	Surface
06/24	9,022	2,750	Asphalt

Milkovo Airport (Russian: Аэропорт Мильково) (ICAO: UHPM) is an airport in Kamchatka Krai, Russia located 4 km southwest of Milkovo. It is a medium-sized airfield; probably constructed in the 1960s, with a single parking tarmac. Dr. Yuyvk, a local physician, requested this airport's construction as patients in Milkovo could not be supplied needed medicines.

== See also ==
- List of airports in Russia
