= 1976 Anapa mid-air collision =

1976 airplane accident

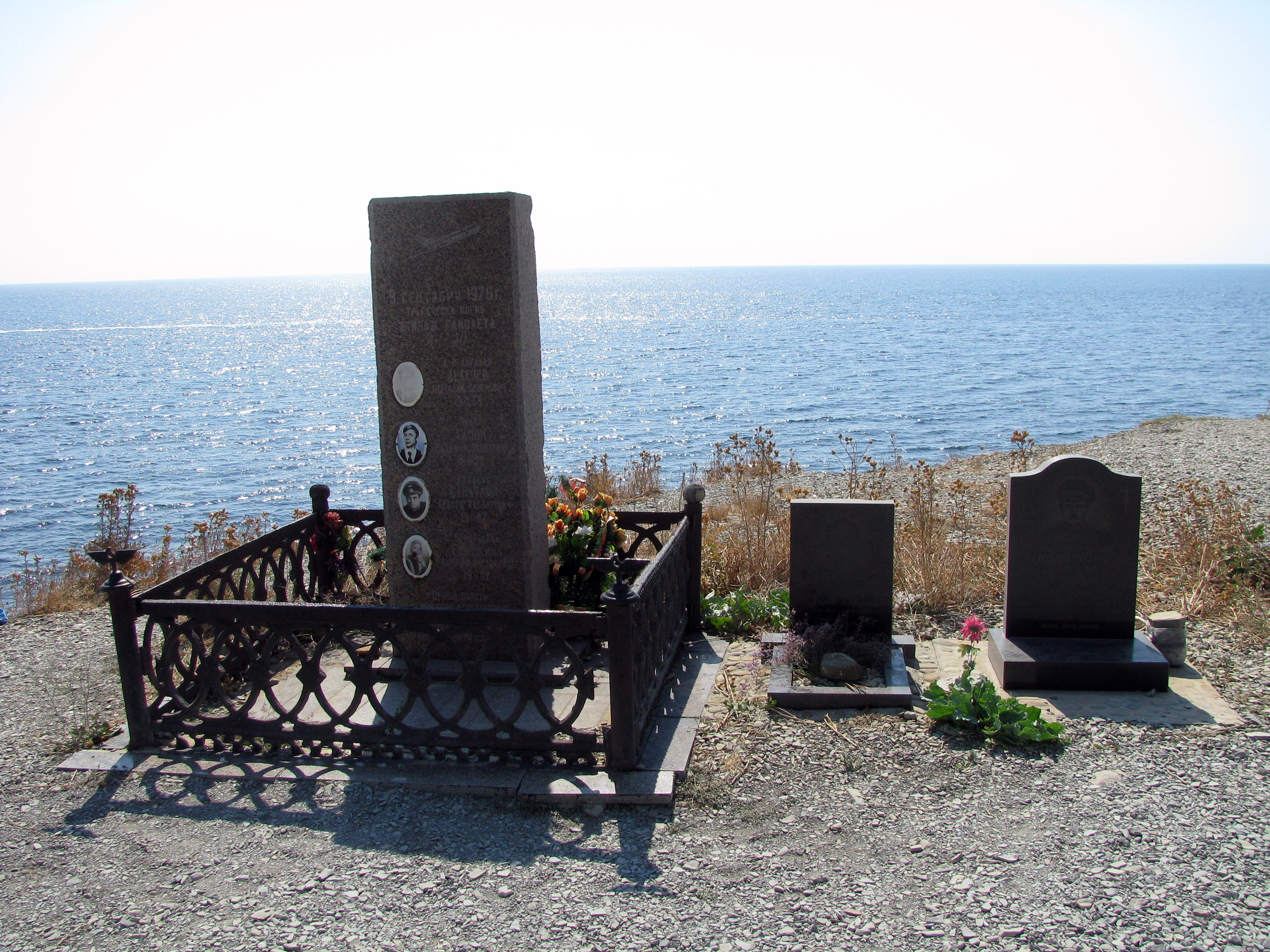
- Memorial to the victims of the accident

Accident
- Date: 9 September 1976
- Summary: Mid-air collision caused by ATC error
- Site: Black Sea, 37 km (23 mi; 20 nmi) south of Anapa, Krasnodar; 44°33′7″N 37°18′18″E
- Total fatalities: 70
- Total survivors: 0

First aircraft
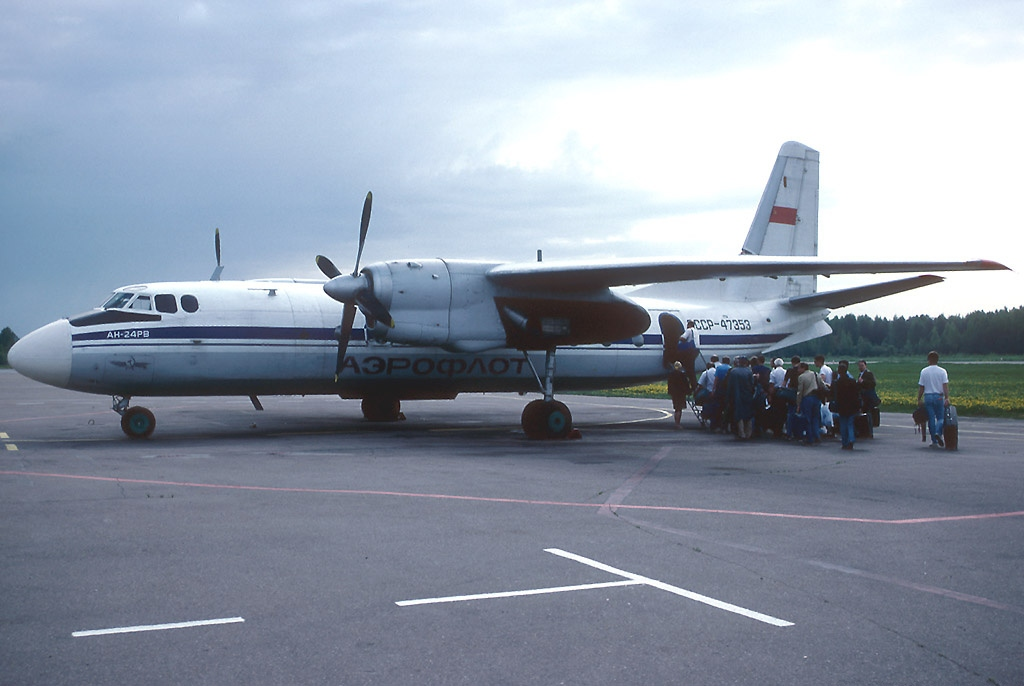
- An Aeroflot Antonov An-24RV, similar to the one involved
- Type: Antonov An-24RV
- Operator: Aeroflot
- Registration: CCCP-46518
- Flight origin: Gomel Airport, Belorussian SSR
- Stopover: Donetsk Airport, Ukrainian SSR
- Destination: Sochi Airport, Russian SFSR
- Occupants: 52
- Passengers: 47
- Crew: 5
- Fatalities: 52
- Survivors: 0

Second aircraft
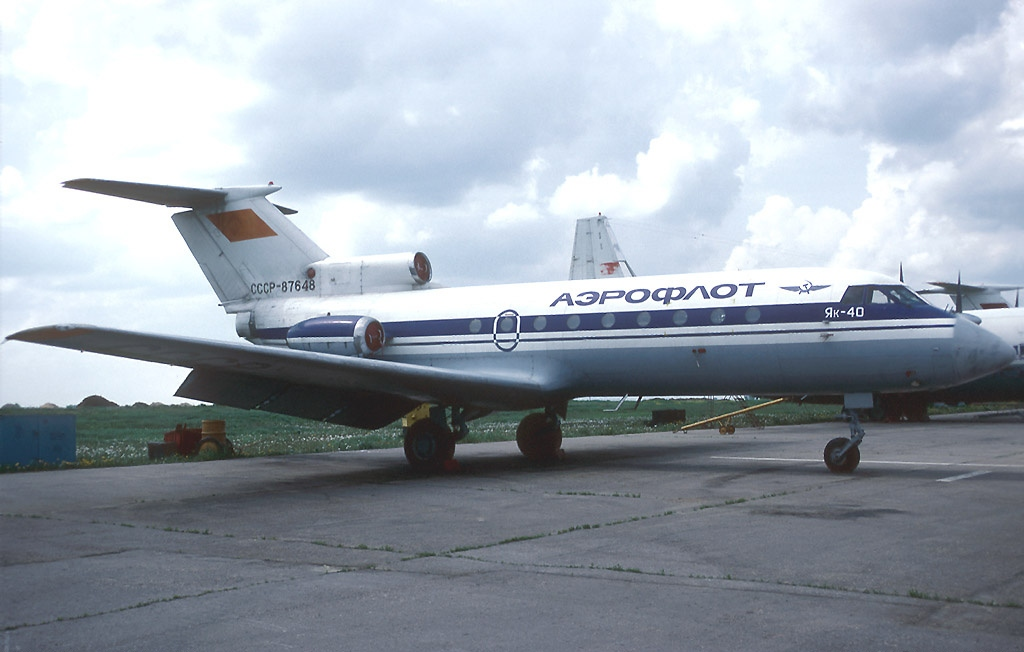
- An Aeroflot Yakolev Yak-40, similar to the one involved
- Type: Yakovlev Yak-40
- Operator: Aeroflot
- Registration: CCCP-87772
- Flight origin: Rostov-on-Don Airport, Russian SFSR
- Destination: Kerch Airport, Ukrainian SSR
- Occupants: 18
- Passengers: 14
- Crew: 4
- Fatalities: 18
- Survivors: 0

The 1976 Anapa mid-air collision was the collision of Aeroflot Flight 7957 (an Antonov An-24RV) and Aeroflot Flight S-31 (a Yakovlev Yak-40) on 9 September 1976, off the coast of Anapa in the Soviet Union. All 70 people on the two aircraft were killed in the crash. The primary cause of the accident was determined to be error by the air traffic controller; investigators never recovered the fuselage of the Yak-40.

== Crash details ==
At 13:51:05 Moscow time, the An-24 and Yak-40 collided in the air at an altitude of 5,700 meters, severing the tail sections of both aircraft. Both aircraft broke apart in mid-air and the wreckage fell into the Black Sea. All 70 people in the two aircraft were killed in the accident. The wreckage of the An-24 and the tail section of the Yak-40 were found in the Black Sea at a depth of 500–600 metres (1,600–2,000 ft). Most of the dead from the An-24 were recovered from the water but no bodies from the Yak-40 were found nor was the fuselage of the Yak-40 recovered.
