= KXD =

KXD or kxd may refer to:

- KXD, a brand used by KXDF-CD, a television station licensed to Fairbanks, Alaska, United States
- IATA code for Kondinskoye Airport, a minor airport in Russia
- ISO 639-3 code for the Kedayan language, a.k.a. Brunei Malay
