= KHC =

KHC may refer to:

- Kinesin heavy chain, a sub-component of kinesin proteins
- Kingdom Holding Company, company based in Saudi Arabia
- Kraft Heinz Company (stock ticker KHC)
- KHC, the IATA code for Kerch Airport, Crimea, Ukraine
- Honorary Chaplain to the King
