= Yuzhny Airport =

Yuzhny Airport (Russian for "southern airport") may refer to:

- Ivanovo Yuzhny Airport, an airport in Ivanovo, Russia
- Oryol Yuzhny Airport, an airport in Oryol, Russia
- Smolensk South Airport, an airport in Smolensk, Russia
- Taganrog South Airport, an airport in Taganrog, Russia
- Tashkent International Airport, an airport in Tashkent, Uzbekistan
