= Norilsk Urban District =

Norilsk Urban District Норильск (Russian)
- District
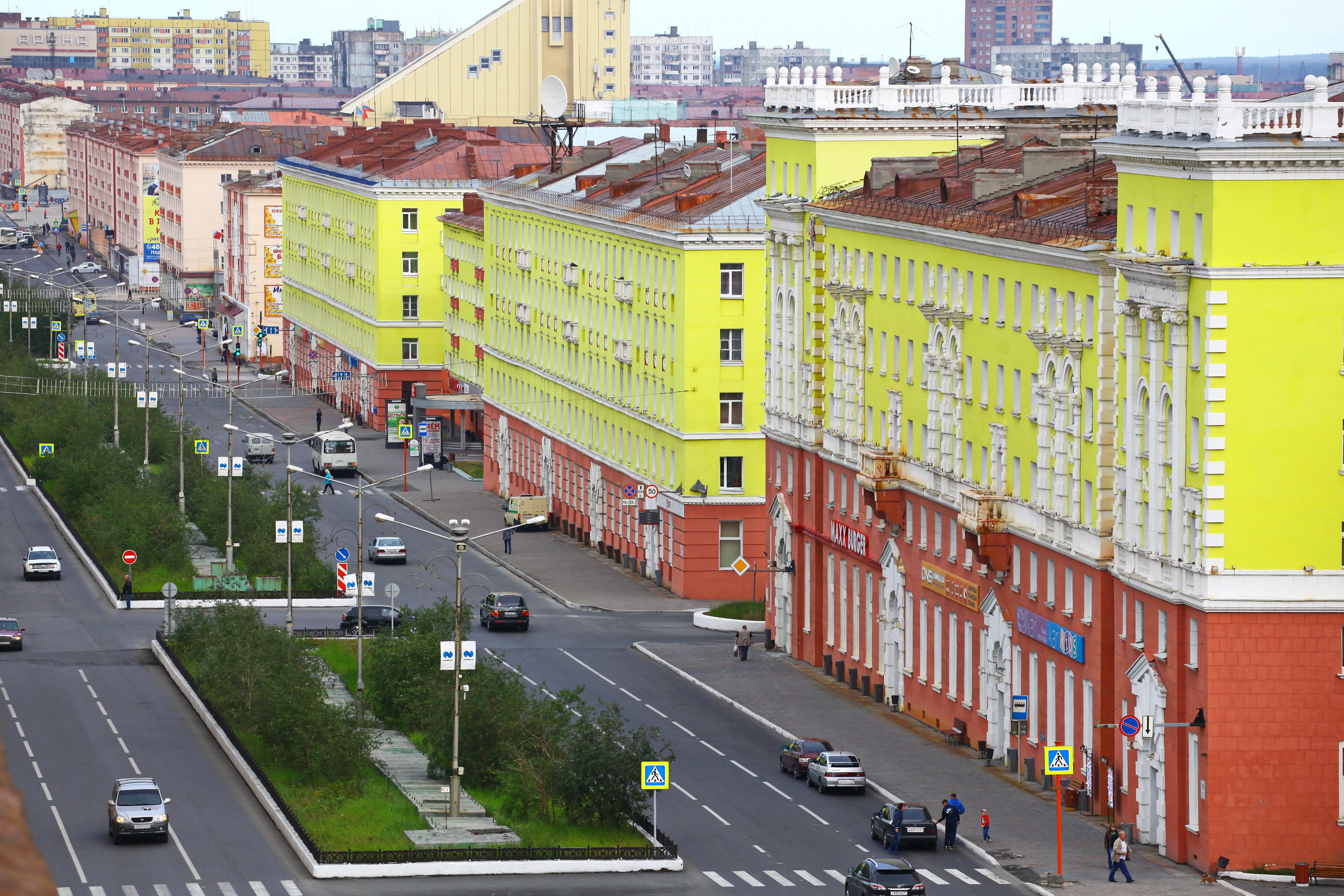
- Norilsk

- Flag Coat of arms

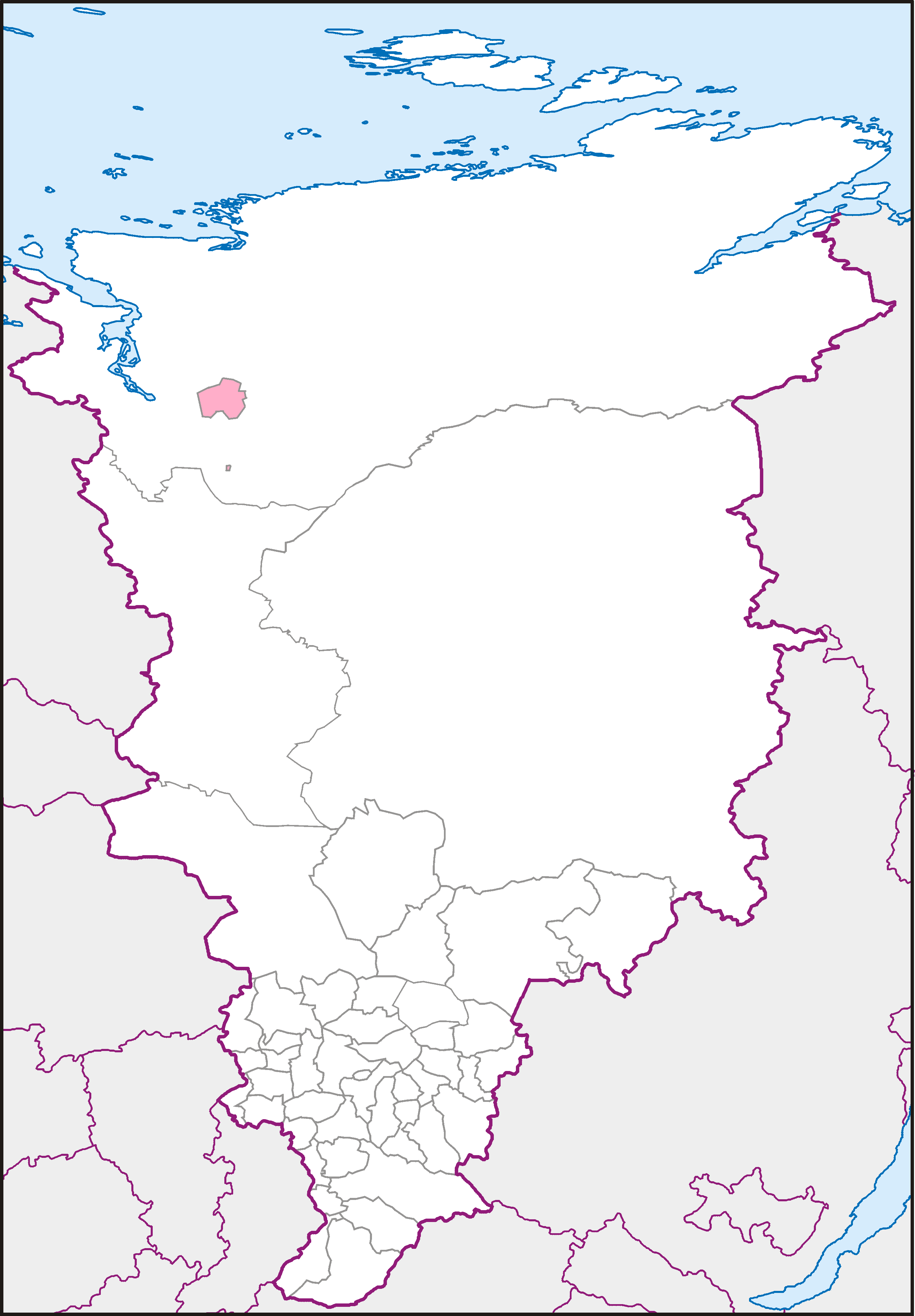
- Location of the Norilsk Urban District in Krasnoyarsk Krai
- Coordinates: 69°20′00″N 88°13′00″E
- Country: Russia
- Federal subject: Krasnoyarsk Krai
- Established: July 15, 1953
- Administrative center: Norilsk

Government
  - Type: Local government
  - Body: Duma
  - Head: Dmitry Vladimirovich Karasyov

Area
  - Total: 4,509 km^{2} (1,741 sq mi)

Population (2010 Census)
  - Total: 176,252
  - Estimate (2024): 177,427
  - Density: 39.09/km^{2} (101.2/sq mi)
  - Urban: 100%
  - Rural: 0%

Administrative structure
  - Inhabited localities: 1 cities/towns, 1 urban-type settlements

Municipal structure
  - Municipally incorporated as: Norilsk Urban Okrug
  - Municipal divisions: 2 urban settlements
- Time zone: UTC+7 (MSK+4)
- OKTMO ID: 04729000
- Website: https://www.norilsk-city.ru/

The Norilsk Urban District or Norilsk Urban Okrug (Russian: Город Норильск) is an administrative and municipal city district (okrug), one of the twenty-two in Krasnoyarsk Krai, Russia. It is enclaved inside the Taymyrsky Dolgano-Nenetsky District. The area of the district is 4,509 square kilometers (1,741 sq mi). Its administrative center is the city of Norilsk, which accounts for 99.5% of the district's population. The population at the 2021 census was 175,237 inhabitants. Population: 175,237 (2021 census); 176,252 (2010 census); 221,908 (2002 census); 267,609 (1989 Soviet census).

Historical population
Year	Pop.	±%
1959	123,513	—
1970	159,206	+28.9%
1979	234,633	+47.4%
1989	267,609	+14.1%
2002	221,908	−17.1%
2010	176,252	−20.6%
2021	175,237	−0.6%
Source: Censuses

== History ==
By the Decree of the Presidium of the Supreme Soviet of the RSFSR dated July 15, 1953, the working village of Norilsk was transformed into a city of regional subordination with the separation of the Taymyr National Okrug from the Dudinsky District.

From 1935 to 1956, the labor camp Norillag existed in Norilsk.

On November 2, 1956, the villages of Medvezhy, Ugolny, and Kayerkan were classified as working villages.

On January 12, 1965, the workers' villages of Kayerkan, Talnakh and Snezhnogorsk were transferred to the administrative subordination of the Norilsk City Council of Workers' Deputies.

On August 25, 1970, Talnakh was transformed into a district of urban subordination.

On November 4, 1982, Talnakh and Kayerkan were transformed into cities of regional subordination with administrative subordination to the Norilsk City Council of Workers' Deputies.

The boundaries are established by the Law of the Krasnoyarsk Territory of December 27, 2000 N 13-1102 “On establishing the boundaries of the municipal formation of the city of Norilsk”.

The status of an urban district is vested in the Law of the Krasnoyarsk Territory of December 10, 2004 N 12-2697 “On granting the municipality of the city of Norilsk the status of an urban district”.

== Government ==
The head of the district is Dmitry Vladimirovich Karasyov, since January 27, 2021.

== Municipalities ==
Norilsk Urban District includes 1 city and 1 urban-type settlement: Norilsk and Snezhnogorsk. Norilsk is divided into 3 districts.

Settlement	Type of settlement	Population (2021)	Population (2010)	Change (2010-2021)
Norilsk	city, administrative center	174,453	175,365	-0.5%
Central District	district of Norilsk	106,044	105,720	+0.3%
Kayerkan	district of Norilsk	21,193	22,338	-5.1%
Talnakh	district of Norilsk	47,216	47,307	-0.2%
Snezhnogorsk	urban-type settlement	784	887	-11.6%

== Abolished settlements ==
In the 1950s, there were 30 villages around Norilsk, each of which was created at a mine, mine or construction site, most often on the site of a former lagot department. But only 3 of them received official status.

Alykel - until 1993, a village of military pilots near Norilsk.

Zapadniy - until 1990.

Medvezhiy has been a working settlement since November 2, 1956.

Ugolny has been a working settlement since November 2, 1956.

Listvyanka - 1967-1969 - a coal village, closed due to the gasification of the NPR. The population was a couple of hundred geologists and miners.

Talnakh and Kayerkan - since 2004 are districts of the city of Norilsk.
