= Yuzhny =

Yuzhny (Russian: 'southern')(masculine), Yuzhnaya (feminine) or Yuzhnoye (neuter) may refer to:

== Places ==
- Yuzhny Okrug, name of several okrugs in Russia
- Yuzhny, Russia (Yuzhnaya, Yuzhnoye), name of several inhabited localities in Russia
- Yuzhny Island, an island in Russia
- Yuzhny Airport (disambiguation), multiple airports
- Yuzhnaya (Moscow Metro), a station of the Moscow Metro, Russia
- Yuzhnoye Design Bureau, a Ukrainian design bureau of satellites and rockets
- Iujnoe, a locality in Cahul District, Moldova

== People ==
- Mikhail Youzhny (b. 1982), Russian tennis player
