= GYG =

GYG may refer to:

- Global Young Greens, an emerging global organisation
- Guzman y Gomez, Australian casual-dining restaurant chain
- GYG, the IATA code for Magan Airport, Russia
- gyg, the ISO 639-3 code for Gbayi language, Democratic Republic of the Congo
