= VLU =

VLU may refer to:

- IATA airport code for Velikiye Luki Airport
- Văn Lang University, in Ho Chi Minh City, Viet Nam
- Väikeste Lõõtspillide Ühing an Estonian folk ensemble
