= Chaybukha Airport =

Airport in Magadan Oblast, Russia

Chaybukha
- IATA: none; ICAO: UHMG

Summary
- Airport type: Public
- Location: Chaybukha
- Elevation AMSL: 207 ft / 63 m
- Coordinates: 61°50′6″N 160°32′54″E

Map
- Location in Magadan Oblast

Runways
Direction	Length		Surface
Direction	ft	m	Surface
06/24	6,562	2,000	Concrete

Chaybukha (also Gizhiga or Chaibukha) (ICAO: UHMG) is an airport in Magadan Oblast, Russia, located 8 km northeast of Chaybukha. It is a major paved airfield with rudimentary taxiways and small parking apron. It services medium-sized airliners.

== See also ==
- List of airports in Russia
