= Turlatovo Airport =

- IATA: RZN; ICAO: none

Summary
- Airport type: Public
- Location: Ryazan
- Elevation AMSL: 502 ft / 153 m
- Coordinates: 54°33′18″N 39°51′18″E
- Interactive map of Turlatovo Airport

Runways
Direction	Length		Surface
Direction	ft	m	Surface
	3,937	1,200	Concrete

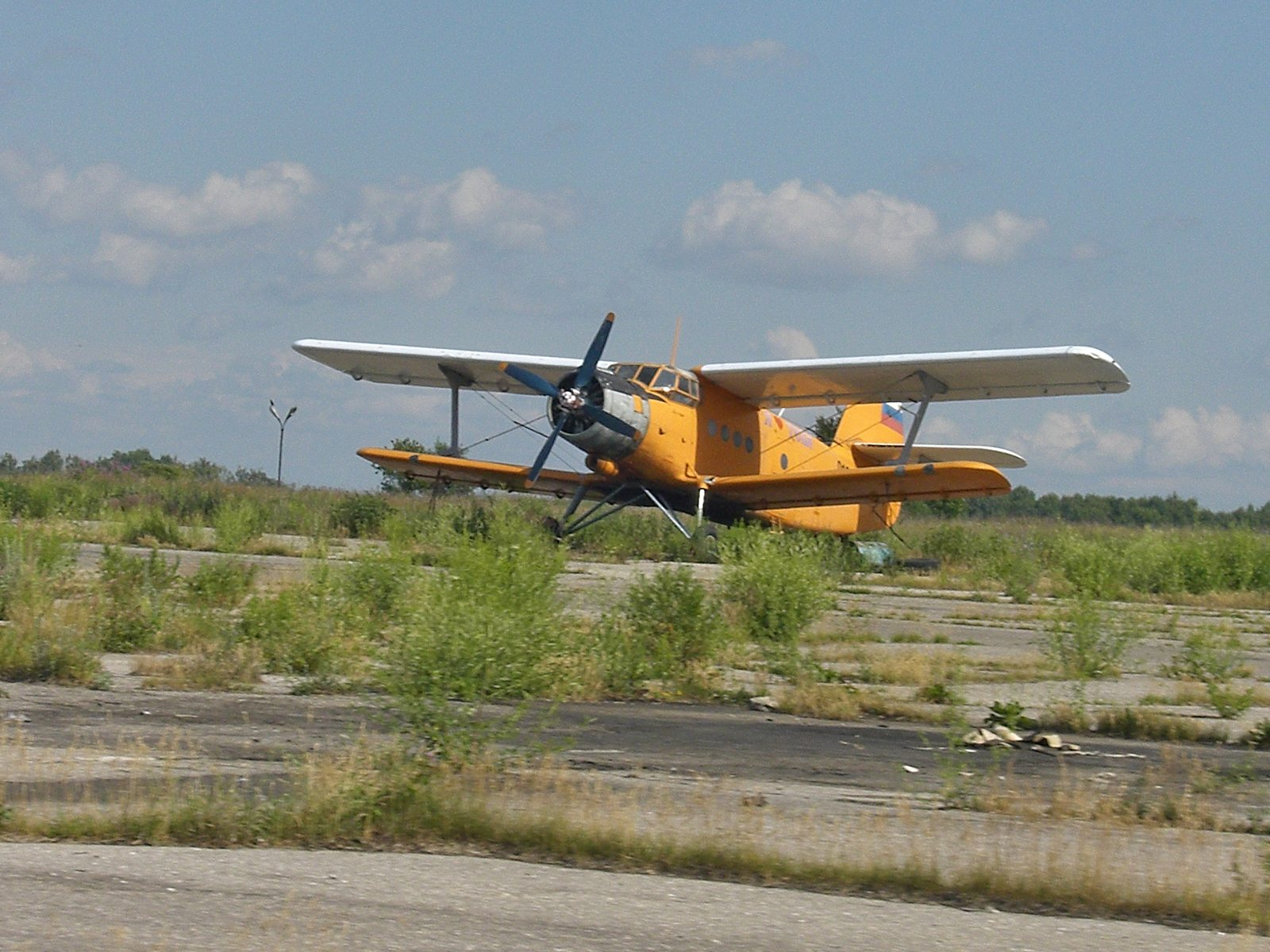
Antonov An-2 at Turlatovo

Turlatovo Airport (Russian: Аэропорт Турлатово) (IATA: RZN, ICAO: UUWR) is an airport in Ryazan Oblast, Russia, located 10 km southeast of Ryazan. It is a small civilian airstrip, currently with no regular flights. Used for parachute sports, training and occasional small aviation flights.

As of November 2024, it is reported as "closed" by one source of information and satellite imagery seems to confirm.

== See also ==
- List of airports in Russia
