= Kursk Vostochny Airport =

Kursk Vostochny Airport Аэропорт Курск-Восточный
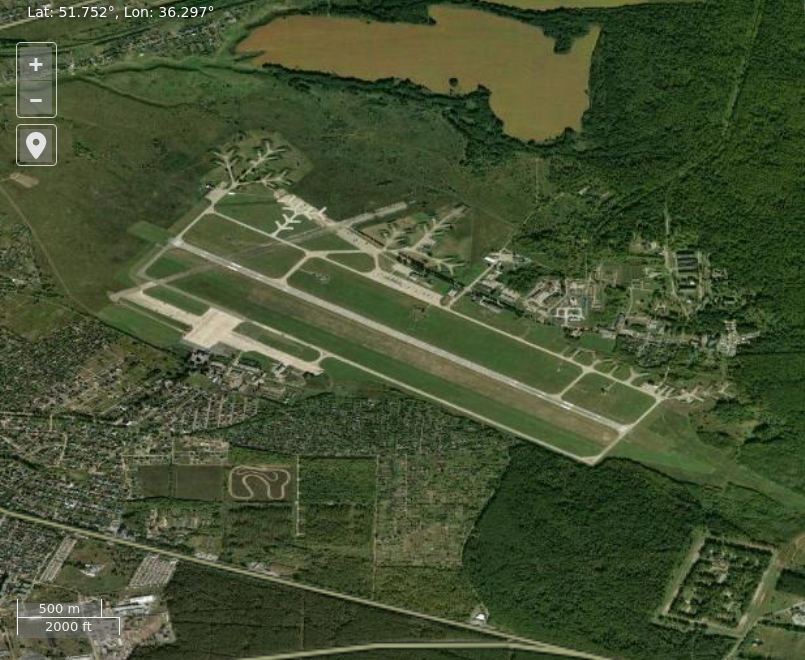
- Satellite imagery of Khalino air base

- IATA: URS; ICAO: UUOK

Summary
- Airport type: Civilian, Military
- Owner: Russian Aerospace Forces
- Operator: 6th Air and Air Defence Forces Army
- Location: Kursk, Kursk Oblast, Russia
- Elevation AMSL: 686 ft (209 m)
- Coordinates: 51°45′6″N 36°17′48″E
- Website: aerokursk.ru

Map
- Shown within Kursk Oblast, Russia Kursk Vostochny (Russia)

Runways
Direction	Length		Surface
Direction	m	ft	Surface
12/30	2,500	8,202	Concrete

Kursk Vostochny Airport (Russian: Аэропорт Курск-Восточный) (IATA: URS, ICAO: UUOK), also known as Khalino airbase, Kursk-Khalino, is an interceptor aircraft base in Kursk Oblast, Russia, with a single 2,500 m (8,200 ft) runway located 7 km east of Kursk. It has been used for many decades as a military airbase and has had periods of time when it was also utilized as a commercial airport. It is located 4 miles northeast of Kursk and is considered a medium-sized base, with several alert pads. A civilian tarmac is located on the southern side of the airfield, which utilizes the common runway facilities.

== History ==
Since 1940, the 48th Long-Range Bomber Aviation Division was formed at the airfield, with its regiments stationed at the Kursk airfields.

From March 1958 to April 1961, the 178th Air Defense Fighter Aviation Regiment, flying MiG-15 and MiG-17 aircraft, was based at the airfield. The regiment was relocated from Oreshkino Airfield (Kaluga) and performed air defense missions, forming part of the 15th Guards Fighter Aviation Division until its disbandment. From April 1979 until its disbandment on May 1, 1998, the 472nd Air Defense Fighter Aviation Regiment, flying MiG-23S aircraft, was based at the airfield, performing air defense missions and forming part of the 7th Air Defense Corps (since 1994, the 7th Air Defense Division).

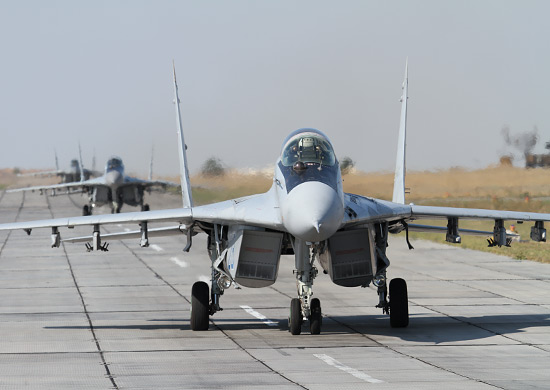
A MiG-29 SMT of the 14th Guards Fighter Aviation Regiment during the Caucasus 2016 exercises. September 7, 2016.

Khalino airbase was home to:

- 472nd Fighter Aviation Regiment from 4 October 1979 to 1998. Moved in from Oryol, Oryol Oblast, where it had been stationed from 1950 to 1979. Equipped with Mikoyan-Gurevich MiG-23P (ASCC: Flogger) or S from 1979. Disbanded 1 May 1998.
- 14th Guards Fighter Aviation Regiment (14 Gv IAP) flying Mikoyan MiG-29 (SMT/UBT) (ASCC: Fulcrum) aircraft, having been relocated from Zherdevka (air base). Now part of the 105th Guards Mixed Aviation Division flying the Sukhoi Su-30SM (NATO: Flanker-H).

On May 14, 2021, the airport was named after Soviet aeronautical engineer Mikhail Gurevich.

All commercial flight activity at the airport was banned by Russian authorities at the start of the 2022 Russian invasion of Ukraine, starting at 03:45 on 24 February 2022.

=== Russian invasion of Ukraine ===
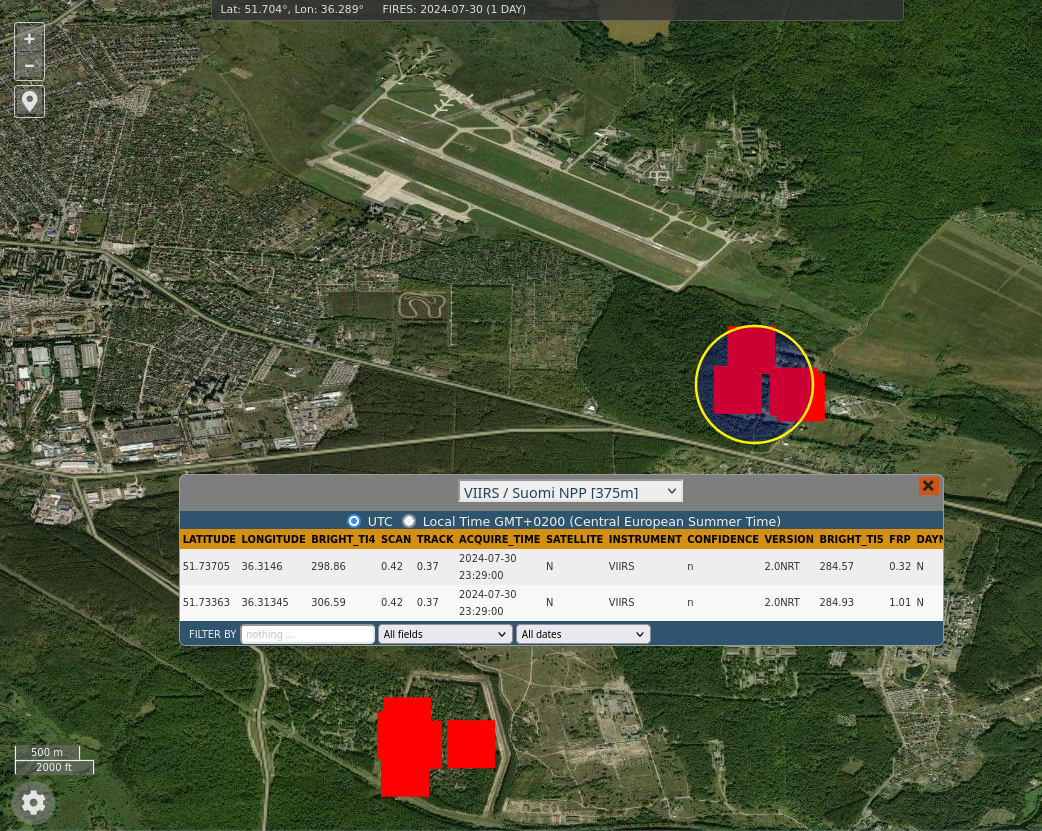
NASA's FIRMS detected fires 30 July 2024 23:29:00 (UTC) at two military storage facilities south of the air base

On 6 December 2022 the airport's oil storage caught fire. The Kursk governor blamed the fire on a drone strike amid the 2022 Russian invasion of Ukraine.

On 2 June 2023, Ukrainian sources reported several Su-34 combat aircraft located at the airport were damaged/destroyed, along with a single MiG-29 and a Pantsir-S1 air defense missile system. The information has not yet been verified independently.

On 31 July 2024 the Armed Forces of Ukraine struck military storage near the airbase, causing fire detected by NASA's FIRMS.

On 3 July 2025, an aviation arsenal at Khalino airbase was struck by Ukrainian drones, leading to an explosion believed to include ammunition for the Pantsir-S1, one of which was "probably" damaged.

== Airlines and destinations ==
RusLine provided limited scheduled commercial service to Moscow–Vnukovo as of 2018, and to Saint Petersburg and Sochi as of 2019. All commercial service at the airport was halted in February 2022 due to the Russian invasion of Ukraine.

== See also ==
- List of airports in Russia
- List of military airbases in Russia
- ru:472-й истребительный авиационный полк
