= Yuzhny Okrug =

Yuzhny Okrug may refer to:

- Southern Federal District (Yuzhny federalny okrug), a federal district of Russia
- Southern Administrative Okrug (Yuzhny administrativny okrug), an administrative okrug of Moscow, Russia

== See also ==
- Yuzhny (disambiguation)
