= Snezhnogorsk Airport =

Snezhnogorsk
- IATA: none; ICAO: UOIC

Summary
- Airport type: Public
- Location: Snezhnogorsk
- Elevation AMSL: 102 ft / 31 m
- Coordinates: 68°4′36″N 87°38′42″E
- Interactive map of Snezhnogorsk

Runways
Direction	Length		Surface
Direction	ft	m	Surface
13/31	3,937	1,200	Asphalt

Snezhnogorsk Airport (ICAO: UOIC) is an airfield in Russia located 5 km west of Snezhnogorsk. It is a small paved, fully engineered airfield with one or two buildings and a few narrow taxiways. As of 2024, the airport is not listed as operational by the Federal Air Transport Agency of Russia.

== See also ==
- List of airports in Russia
