= Sarmany Airport =

Sarmany
- IATA: none; ICAO: UWKR

Summary
- Airport type: Public
- Location: Sarmany
- Elevation AMSL: 449 ft / 137 m
- Coordinates: 55°15′30″N 52°34′24″E
- Interactive map of Sarmany

Runways
Direction	Length		Surface
Direction	ft	m	Surface
	4,429	1,350	Asphalt

Sarman is a small airfield with an asphalt runway in Tatarstan, Russia, located 2 kilometres (1.2 mi) northwest of Sarman village.

== See also ==
- List of airports in Russia
