= Pakhachi Airport =

- IATA: none; ICAO: UHPA; LID: ПАЧ

Summary
- Airport type: Public
- Location: Ust-Pakhachi
- Elevation AMSL: 10 ft / 3 m
- Coordinates: 60°33′24″N 169°6′36″E
- Interactive map of Pakhachi Airport

Runways
Direction	Length		Surface
Direction	ft	m	Surface
10/28	4,560	1,390	Asphalt

Pakhachi Airport (ICAO: UHPA) is an airport in Koryak Okrug, Russia located two kilometers west of Ust-Pakhachi. It services small transport aircraft.

== See also ==
- List of airports in Russia
