= Staraya Russa Airport =

Staraya Russa
- IATA: none; ICAO: none

Summary
- Airport type: Public
- Location: Staraya Russa
- Elevation AMSL: 52 ft / 16 m
- Coordinates: 57°57′42″N 31°23′12″E
- Interactive map of Staraya Russa

Runways
Direction	Length		Surface
Direction	ft	m	Surface
	6,562	2,000	Concrete

Staraya Russa (also Staraya Rossiya) is an aerodrome in Russia located 4 km southeast of Staraya Russa. It contains a large maintenance facility for Antonov and Ilyushin aircraft. It was listed on 1974 Department of Defense Global Navigation Chart No. 3 as having jet facilities.

== See also ==
- List of airports in Russia
