= Zheleznogorsk Airport =

- IATA: none; ICAO: UIBV

Summary
- Airport type: Public
- Location: Zheleznogorsk-Ilimsky
- Elevation AMSL: 1,946 ft / 593 m
- Coordinates: 56°29′18″N 104°6′12″E
- Interactive map of Zheleznogorsk Airport

Runways
Direction	Length		Surface
Direction	ft	m	Surface
10/28	4,593	1,400	Concrete

Zheleznogorsk Airport (Russian: Аэропорт Железногорск) (ICAO: UIBV) is an airport in Russia located 10 km south of Zheleznogorsk-Ilimsky. It services small airliners.

== See also ==
- List of airports in Russia
