= Milkovo =

Milkovo (Russian: Мильково or Милково) is the name of several rural localities in Russia:

- Milkovo, Kamchatka Krai, a selo in Milkovsky District of Kamchatka Krai
- Milkovo, Vologda Oblast, a selo in Vologodsky District of Vologda Oblast
- Milkovo, Perm Krai, a selo in Dobryansky District of Perm Krai
- Milkovo, Moscow Oblast, a derevnya in Leninsky District of Moscow Oblast
