= Kyzyl-Syr Airport =

- IATA: none; ICAO: UENK

Summary
- Airport type: Public
- Location: Kyzyl-Syr
- Elevation AMSL: 331 ft / 101 m
- Coordinates: 63°53′6″N 122°46′36″E
- Interactive map of Kyzyl-Syr Airport

Runways
Direction	Length		Surface
Direction	ft	m	Surface
18/36	3,281	1,000	Concrete

Kyzyl-Syr Airport (Russian: Аэропорт Кызыл-Сыр) (ICAO: UENK) is an airport in Russia located 1 km southeast of Kyzyl-Syr.

== See also ==
- List of airports in Russia
