= 472nd Fighter Aviation Regiment =

The 472nd Fighter Aviation Regiment (Military Unit Number 61364) was a regiment of the Soviet Air Defence Forces, which later came under Russian command. The regiment was formed at the beginning of 1950.

It was formed on 15 May 1950 at Orel at the Oryol Yuzhny Airport, though its formation had begun early 1950. It was relocated to Kursk to Kursk Vostochny Airport ("Eastern") October 4, 1979 (leading the team, the material part), October 7, 1979, and the ground echelon of the regimental banner.

It was based at Orel from 1950 until 4 October 1979, upon which it moved to Kursk, where it was stationed until disbandment on 1 May 1998.

== Armament ==
- Since the formation of the regiment fighters Yak-17;
- December 1950 with the fighters MiG-15;
- In 1957, the fighters MiG-17 and MiG-19;
- In 1979, the fighters MiG-23P.

== Crashes ==
- On December 27, 1989, Lieutenant Borsch's aircraft suffered engine failure. Airplane pilot led to the village Sapogova and ejected, and the fighter crashed in a field.
- On March 3, 1994, during a training flight, Major Vladimir Zhivolup's MiG-23 suffered engine failure. After trying thrice unsuccessfully tried to restart the engine, the plane crashed on the outskirts of Kursk and cut through a clearing of a birch forest, destroying the number 59 house on the street and Bratsk. The wooden house caught fire, killing an old woman. Two children were pulled from a burning house passing by pochtalonka. The pilot survived uninjured. Due to established tradition in the hospital at the time, he was discharged with a diagnosis of "Osteochondrosis" and returned to duty.
- On 8 October 1971 in Orel, a Mikoyan-Gurevich MiG-19 piloted by Captain Ivan Nechayev crashed.
