= Kozyrevsk Airport =

Kozyrevsk
- IATA: none; ICAO: UHPO

Summary
- Airport type: Public
- Location: Kozyrevsk
- Elevation AMSL: 331 ft / 101 m
- Coordinates: 56°5′24″N 159°52′36″E
- Interactive map of Kozyrevsk

Runways
Direction	Length		Surface
Direction	ft	m	Surface
~~03/21~~	~~4,429~~	~~1,350~~	~~Concrete~~

Kozyrevsk Airport (ICAO: UHPO) was an airport in Russia located 3 km northeast of Kozyrevsk. It is a minor paved airfield with a spartan, neglected appearance. The airport was closed in 1995 by the Russian Ministry of Transport for reasons of lower flight volumes and growing maintenance costs. Overhead imagery from Google Earth show vegetation intrusion in the former runway area beginning (no later than) 2005, and far progressed by 2016.

== See also ==
- List of airports in Russia
