= Semenovskoye Shidrovo Airport =

Semenovskoye Shidrovo
- IATA: none; ICAO: none

Summary
- Airport type: Public
- Location: Bereznik
- Elevation AMSL: 105 ft / 32 m
- Coordinates: 62°49′24″N 42°47′48″E
- Interactive map of Semenovskoye Shidrovo

Runways
Direction	Length		Surface
Direction	ft	m	Surface
12/30	5,741	1,750	Concrete

Semenovskoye Shidrovo is an airport in Russia located 8 km southeast of Bereznik. It consists of a paved airstrip.

== See also ==
- List of airports in Russia
