= Staroselye Airport =

- IATA: RYB; ICAO: UUBK

Summary
- Airport type: Public
- Operator: NPO Saturn
- Location: Rybinsk
- Elevation AMSL: 423 ft / 129 m
- Coordinates: 58°6′6″N 38°55′30″E
- Interactive map of Staroselye Airport

Runways
Direction	Length		Surface
Direction	ft	m	Surface
04/22	6,562	2,000	Asphalt

Staroselye Airport (Russian: Аэропорт Староселье) (IATA: RYB, ICAO: UUBK) is a medium-sized airport in Yaroslavl Oblast, Russia, located 8 km northeast of Rybinsk. It services small transport aircraft, and features a small utilitarian layout. A nearby airport is Tunoshna Airport.

== Airlines and destinations ==
- NPO Saturn Airlines (Moscow-Domodedovo, Yaroslavl, St.Petersburg-Pulkovo)

Currently, work is suspended in the airport due to unprofitable operations.

== See also ==
- List of airports in Russia
