= Plekhanovo Airport =

Airport in Tyumen, Russia

- IATA: none; ICAO: USTL

Summary
- Airport type: public
- Serves: Tyumen
- Elevation AMSL: 308 ft / 94 m
- Coordinates: 57°8′36″N 65°28′6″E
- Interactive map of Plekhanovo Airport

Runways
Direction	Length		Surface
Direction	ft	m	Surface
02/20	3,609	1,100	Asphalt

Plekhanovo Airport (ICAO: USTL) is an airport in Tyumen Oblast, Russia located 4 km west of Tyumen. A small civilian airport with a parking tarmac, it is one of two airports serving the city of Tyumen, the other being Roshchino International Airport. Plekhanovo Airport is the base for Utair Airlines.

Tyumen is a developing city within Russia. The city's current electrical distribution system does not have capacity to cover all areas of the city. Plans to expand the network include constructing a gas turbine station in western Tyumen that will supply electricity to the Zarechnaya district, and the area surrounding the airport. In 2021, a proposal was approved to finance the construction of a residential area around the Plekhanovo airtport using infrastructure bonds.

== See also ==
- List of airports in Russia
