= Magan Airport =

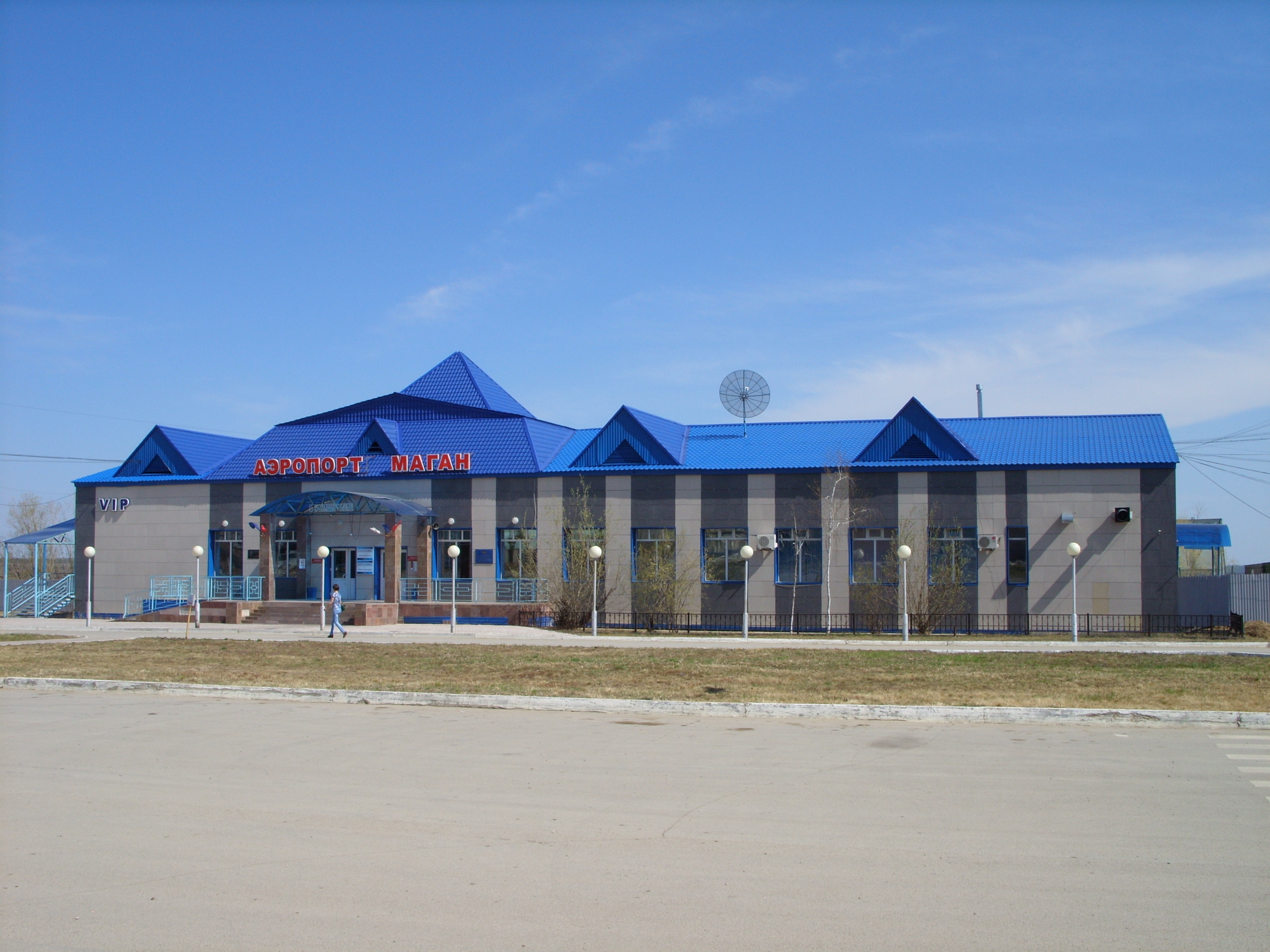
- IATA: GYG; ICAO: UEMM

Summary
- Airport type: Public
- Operator: SakhaAvia
- Location: Magan
- Elevation AMSL: 176 m (577 ft)
- Coordinates: 62°06′26″N 129°32′36″E

Maps
- Sakha Republic in Russia

- Location of the airport in the Sakha Republic
- Sources: GCM, STV

Magan Airport (Russian: Аэропорт Маган; Yakut: Маҕан аэропорда, Mağan aeroporda) (IATA: GYG, ICAO: UEMM) serves the village of Magan, a few kilometers west of Yakutsk, in Russia.

Until the early 1980s, Yakutsk/Magan was monitored as one of nine Arctic staging bases capable of handling the Tupolev Tu-22M (Backfire) bomber.

== See also ==
- List of airports in Russia
