= Raduzhny Airport =

Airport in Russia

- IATA: RAT; ICAO: USNR

Summary
- Airport type: Public
- Serves: Raduzhny, Khanty-Mansi Autonomous Okrug, Russia
- Elevation AMSL: 74 m / 243 ft
- Coordinates: 62°09′31″N 77°19′44″E

Map
- Location of the airport in the Khanty-Mansi Autonomous Okrug RAT (Russia)

Runways
Direction	Length		Surface
Direction	m	ft	Surface
17/35	2,720	8,924	Asphalt
- Sources: Airport Guide, GCM STV

Raduzhny Airport (Russian: Аэропорт Радужный) (IATA: RAT, ICAO: USNR) is an airport in Khanty-Mansi Autonomous Okrug, Russia 8 kilometres (5.0 mi) northwest of Raduzhny. It accommodated wide body airliners. The airport was closed in 2005.

== See also ==
- List of airports in Russia
