= Natalia Kharlampieva =

Yakut poet and journalist (born 1952)

Natalia Ivanovna Kharlampieva (Yakut: Наталья Ивановна Харлампьева) (born 9 January 1952) is a Yakut poet and journalist. She is the editor-in-chief of the first women's magazine published in the Yakut language, Dalbar Hotun.

A native of Magan, Kharlampieva graduated in absentia from Yakutsk State University; she has worked in the airport transit service and in a variety of journalistic posts throughout her career, as well as serving as secretary of the Kobiai district party committee and chairing the Union of Writers of Yakutia. For a time she was editor-in-chief of the Yakut publishing house. She began publishing her writing in 1975, and the following year produced her first volume of poems. She has published around ten collections of her poetry, and her work has appeared in numerous publications; she has received various awards for her work as well. Much of her verse deals with the role of women in Yakut society. Kharlampieva's poetry has been translated into Russian, Kazakh, Tatar, and Ukrainian. In 2016 a collection of her poetry appeared in English as Foremother Asia; it is the first volume of verse from Sakha to be published in English. Kharlampieva has also published literary criticism on the subject of Yakut literature.
