= Magadan-13 Airport =

- IATA: none; ICAO: UHMT

Summary
- Airport type: Public
- Location: Magadan
- Elevation AMSL: 164 ft (50 m)
- Coordinates: 59°37′24″N 150°55′18″E

Map
- Location in Magadan Oblast

Runways
Direction	Length		Surface
Direction	ft	m	Surface
01/19	4,757	1,450	Concrete

Magadan-13 Airport (Russian: Аэропорт Магадан-13) (ICAO: UHMT) is a small airport in Russia located 10 km northeast of Magadan. It handles most propeller-driven transports. Regular passenger Ilyushin Il-14 aircraft were flying here in the 1950s and early 1960s. In the 1970s and 1980s it was a busy airport for charter operations (Antonov An-2, Mi-4, Mi-8, etc.) which served geological expeditions, firefighters, and local transport routes. This is probably a former PVO-Strany fighter field, based on the length of the now-unusable runway between the current active runway and the ramp area.

== Accidents ==
- On May 22, 1948, a Douglas C-47 aircraft collided with the slope of the Marchekan Hill while landing in difficult weather conditions. 8 people on board were killed.
- On October 27, 1953, due to a loss of speed while climbing due to icing and exceeding the maximum permissible load weight, the Il-12 plane crashed, resulting in the death of 22 of the 32 people on board.
- On June 9, 1958, 16.5 km south of the airport, the Il-12 collided with the slope of the Marchekan Hill while landing in difficult weather conditions. All 24 people on board were killed.

== See also ==
- List of airports in Russia
