= Snezhnogorsk =

Snezhnogorsk (Russian: Снежногорск) is the name of several urban localities in Russia:

- Snezhnogorsk, Murmansk Oblast, a town under the administrative jurisdiction of the closed administrative-territorial formation of Alexandrovsk in Murmansk Oblast
- Snezhnogorsk, Krasnoyarsk Krai, a work settlement under the administrative jurisdiction of Tsentralny City District of the krai city of Norilsk in Krasnoyarsk Krai
