= Stary Oskol Airport =

Airport in Russia

Stary Oskol
- IATA: none; ICAO: none

Summary
- Airport type: Public
- Location: Stary Oskol
- Elevation AMSL: 241 m / 791 ft
- Coordinates: 51°19′48″N 37°46′6″E
- Website: www.airportoskol.ru
- Interactive map of Stary Oskol

Runways
Direction	Length		Surface
Direction	m	ft	Surface
04/22	1,798	5,899	?

Stary Oskol Airport (also given as Staryy Oskol) is an airport in Russia located 6 km northwest of Stary Oskol. It is a small civilian airport with a 1,800-metre (5,900 ft) runway.

== Infrastructure ==
The airport's runway is designated 04/22 and measures 1,798 metres (5,899 ft). The airport can handle 30 passengers per hour, and it has parking spaces for four medium-range aircraft.

== See also ==
- List of airports in Russia
