= Yugarenok Airport =

Yugaryonok
- IATA: none; ICAO: UEEK

Summary
- Airport type: Public
- Location: Yugoryonok
- Elevation AMSL: 1,001 ft / 305 m
- Coordinates: 59°45′54″N 137°41′0″E
- Interactive map of Yugaryonok

Runways
Direction	Length		Surface
Direction	ft	m	Surface
	6,562	2,000	Concrete

Yugoryonok is a disused airport in Russia located 1 km (0.62 miles) north of Yugoryonok, a former gold mining town. With the cessation of most of the gold mining activity in the area in the 1990s, the airport was closed.

Its concrete runway appears to be in decay. Its 2,000 m (6,600 feet) runway length is a common indicator of Soviet Air Force installations built during the 1950s, so it probably had some military use. For geography, see Yudoma River.

== See also ==
- List of airports in Russia
