= Tsentralny District, Norilsk =

Tsentralny District Центральный район
- District
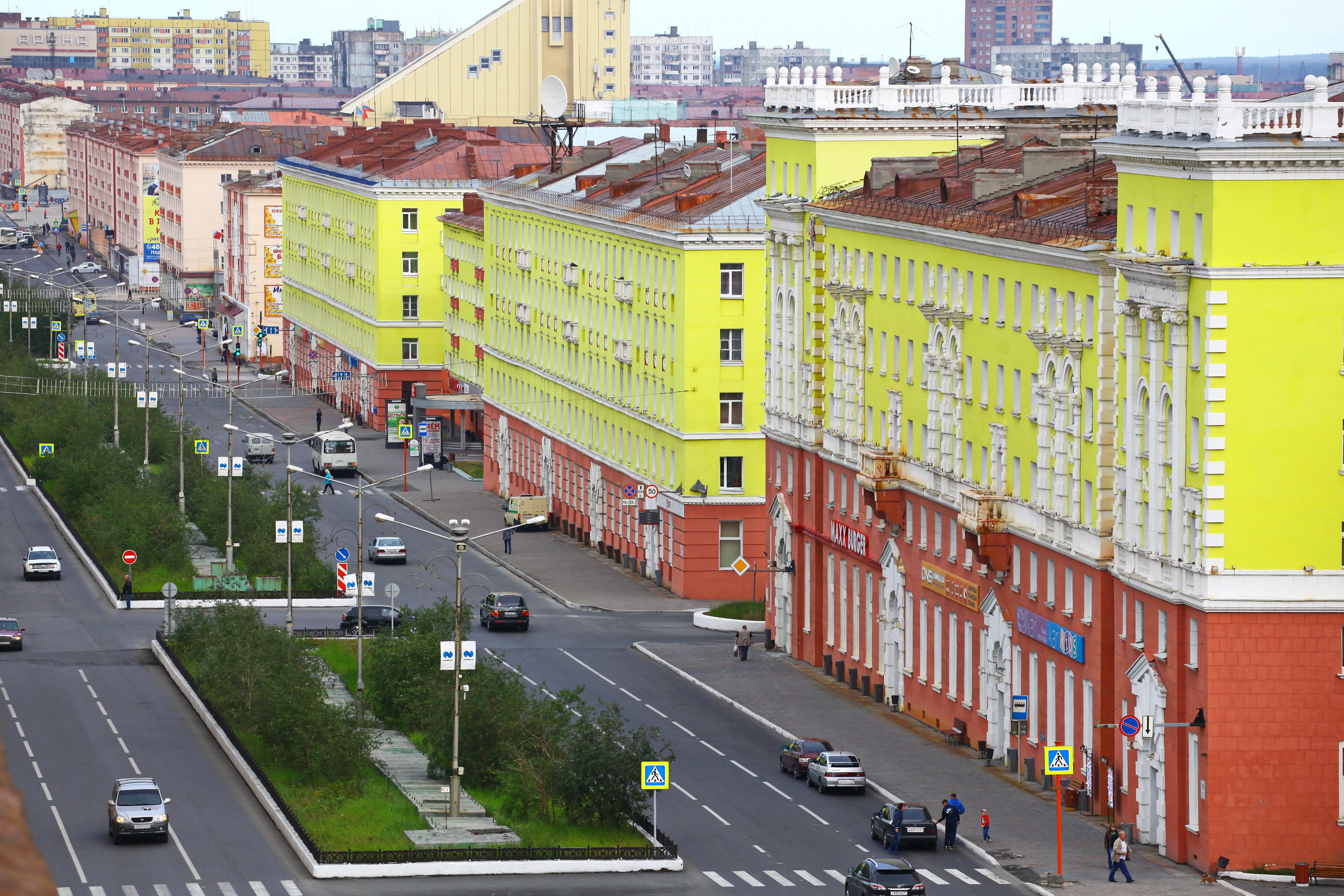
- Leninsky Prospect street

- Coat of arms
- Interactive map of Tsentralny District
- Location of Tsentralny District Tsentralny District (Krasnoyarsk Krai)
- Coordinates: 69°20′N 88°13′E
- Country: Russia
- Federal subject: Krasnoyarsk Krai
- Founded: 2004

Population (2010 Census)
  - Total: 105,720
  - Estimate (2021): 106,044 (+0.3%)

Administrative status
  - Subordinated to: krai city of Norilsk
  - Capital of: krai city of Norilsk

Municipal status
  - Urban okrug: Norilsk Urban District
  - Capital of: Norilsk Urban District
- Postal codes: 663330, 663332, 663333
- Website: www.norilsk-city.ru

Tsentralny District (Russian: Центральный район, lit. 'Central District') is, along with Kayerkan and Talnakh one of the 3 districts (raions) of Norilsk in Krasnoyarsk Krai, Russia. The population is 106,044 as of the 2021 census.

== Description ==
Tsentralny District was formed in 2004 from central Norilsk and the nearby settlement of Oganer.

On the territory of the Tsentralny District is the main part of the streets of Norilsk.

== Population ==
Tsentralny District is currently the only district of Norilsk whose population is currently increasing.

Historical population
Year	Pop.	±%
1939	13,886	—
1959	109,442	+688.1%
1970	135,487	+23.8%
1979	180,358	+33.1%
1989	174,673	−3.2%
2002	134,832	−22.8%
2010	105,720	−21.6%
2021	106,044	+0.3%
Source: Censuses
