= Chistopol Airport =

Airport in the Republic of Tatarstan, Russia

Chistopol Чистополь
- IATA: none; ICAO: UWKI

Summary
- Airport type: Public (Closed)
- Location: Chistopol
- Elevation AMSL: 604 ft (184 m)
- Coordinates: 55°18′18″N 50°37′0″E
- Interactive map of Chistopol

Runways
| Direction | Length | | Surface |
| Direction | ft | m | Surface |
|---|---|---|---|
| | ~~4,921~~ | ~~1,500~~ | ~~Concrete~~ |

Chistopol (ICAO: UWKI) was an airport in Russia located 7 km southwest of Chistopol. It was a small airport, with a single tarmac runway with one building.

Overhead imagery from Google Earth shows a structure, equipment and materials on the runway, beginning before 1 May 2014. Other imagery through 10 August 2018 demonstrates the structure has remained in place. Furthermore, security fencing has been installed and various pieces of equipment within and without the fence, being moved from time-to-time. It appears this airport has been re-purposed as an equipment and materials storage depot.

== History ==
The last regular flights to Kazan were carried out before the completion of the construction of the bridge across the Kama River (Kazan - Chistopol highway) in the winter, when the ferry crossing was not operational. After the commissioning of the bridge across the Kama, the need for air traffic with Kazan disappeared. Currently operated by a local flying club.

In 2009–2015, there were plans to restore the operational suitability of ten small aviation airfields in Tatarstan, including the Chistopol airport.

== See also ==
- List of airports in Russia
