= Raduzhny, Khanty-Mansi Autonomous Okrug =

Raduzhny Радужный
- Town
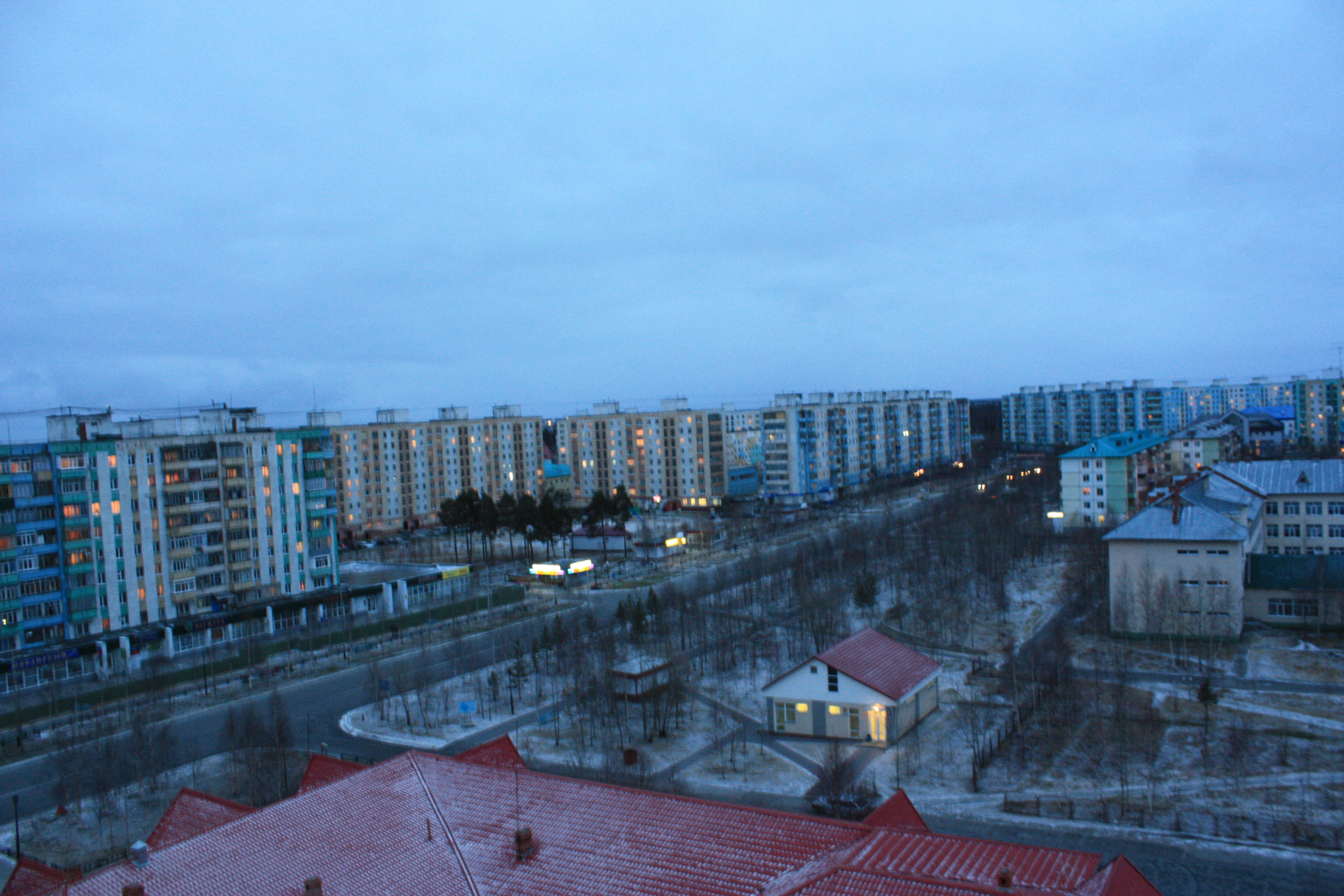
- Raduzhny

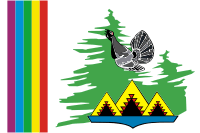
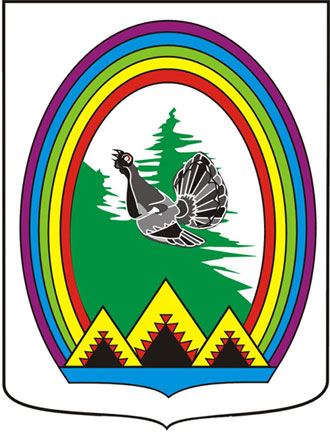
- Flag Coat of arms
- Interactive map of Raduzhny
- Location of Raduzhny Raduzhny (Khanty–Mansi Autonomous Okrug)
- Coordinates: 62°08′N 77°28′E
- Country: Russia
- Federal subject: Khanty-Mansi Autonomous Okrug
- Founded: 1973
- Town status since: 1985
- Elevation: 70 m (230 ft)

Population (2010 Census)
  - Total: 43,399
  - Estimate (2021): 43,577 (+0.4%)

Administrative status
  - Subordinated to: town of okrug significance of Raduzhny
  - Capital of: town of okrug significance of Raduzhny

Municipal status
  - Urban okrug: Raduzhny Urban Okrug
  - Capital of: Raduzhny Urban Okrug
- Time zone: UTC+5 (MSK+2)
- Postal code: 628461–628464
- OKTMO ID: 71877000001

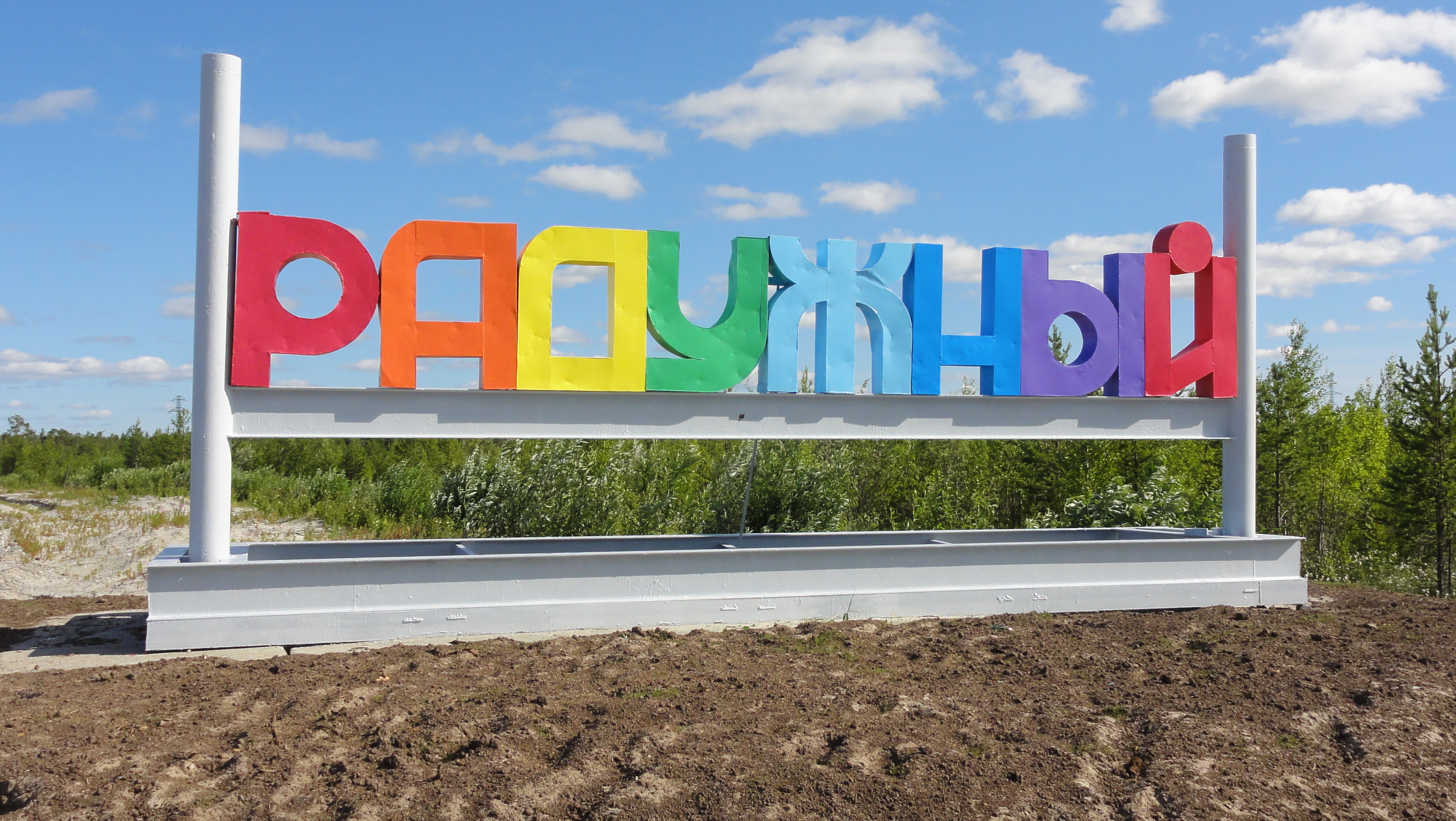
Raduzhny rainbow sign

Raduzhny (Russian: Ра́дужный) is a town in Khanty-Mansi Autonomous Okrug, Russia, located on the Agan River, 475 kilometers (295 mi) northeast of Khanty-Mansiysk and 975 kilometers (606 mi) northeast of Tyumen. Population: 43,399 (2010 census); 47,060 (2002 Census); 43,726 (1989 Census). It is the only town north of 60°N Recording 40 °C, Reaching 40.9 °C 105.6 °F in July 13 2010

== History ==
It was founded as a settlement in an oil-extracting area. It was granted town status in 1985.

== Administrative and municipal status ==
Within the framework of administrative divisions, it is incorporated as the town of okrug significance of Raduzhny—an administrative unit with the status equal to that of the districts. As a municipal division, the town of okrug significance of Raduzhny is incorporated as Raduzhny Urban Okrug.

== Economy ==
The town is served by the Raduzhny Airport. The economy is based on oil and natural gas extraction.
