= Yaroslavl Levtsovo (air base) =

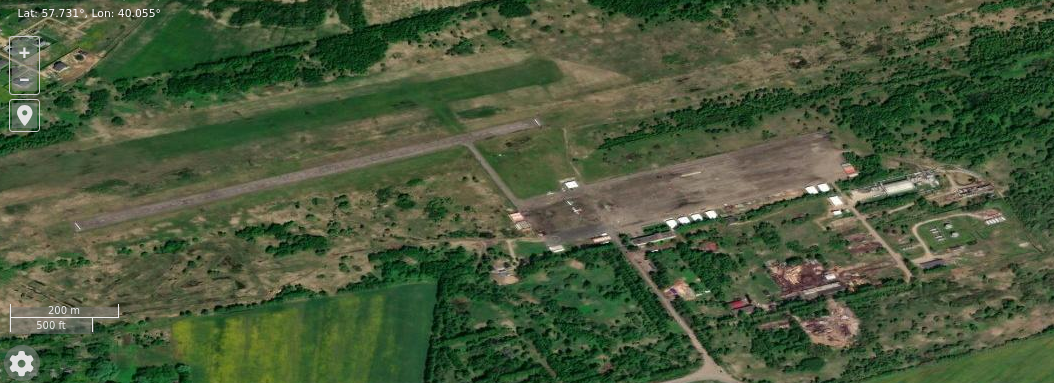
- Satellite imagery of Yaroslavl Levtsovo
- IATA: none; ICAO: none

Summary
- Airport type: Military
- Operator: Russian Air Force
- Location: Yaroslavl
- Elevation AMSL: 331 ft / 101 m
- Coordinates: 57°43′52″N 40°3′18″E
- Interactive map of Yaroslavl Levtsovo

Runways
Direction	Length		Surface
Direction	ft	m	Surface
	5,577	1,700	Dirt

Yaroslavl Levtsovo is an air base in Yaroslavl Oblast, Russia located 5 km north of Yaroslavl. It services Antonov An-2 small transport aircraft and Mil Mi-8 helicopters.

Possibly also known as Dadonovo.

== History ==
The airfield was used for civil aviation in the Soviet era. In 2016, ownership was transferred, with plans to create an aviation museum on the airfield. Since 2010, it is also the site of the Dobrofest music festival.

== See also ==
- List of military airbases in Russia
