= Baherove =

Coordinates: 45°22′N 36°18′E

Baherove (Ukrainian: Багерове, pronounced [bɐˈɦɛrɔu̯e]; Crimean Tatar: Bagerovo; Russian: Багерово) is a town in Crimea, Ukraine. It lends its name to the nearby Baherove Air Base.

== Settlement ==
In 2018, archaeologists discovered the ancient Greek settlement of the 4th-3rd centuries BC near the town of Baherove, called Manitra. The remains of a rectangular tower were discovered, and a necropolis that was not plundered. During the excavation of the necropolis, fragments of black pottery were found, which indicates its prosperity. Among the finds were many coins and a hoard of artifacts. It is believed that Manitra was a royal emporium for trading cattle.
