= Milkovo, Perm Krai =

Milkovo Милково
- Village
- Location within Perm Krai Location within Russia
- Coordinates: 58°48′N 57°10′E
- Country: Russia
- Region: Perm Krai
- District: Dobryansky District
- Time zone: UTC+5:00

Milkovo (Russian: Милково) is a rural locality (a village) in Dobryansky District, Perm Krai, Russia. The population was 1 as of 2010.

== Geography ==
Milkovo is located 88 km northeast of Dobryanka (the district's administrative centre) by road. Tikhaya is the nearest rural locality.
