= Klyuchi (air base) =

Russian airbase

Klyuchi Klyuchi-20 Kura
- Ключи-20 - Кура
- Klyuchi, Kamchatka Krai in Russia
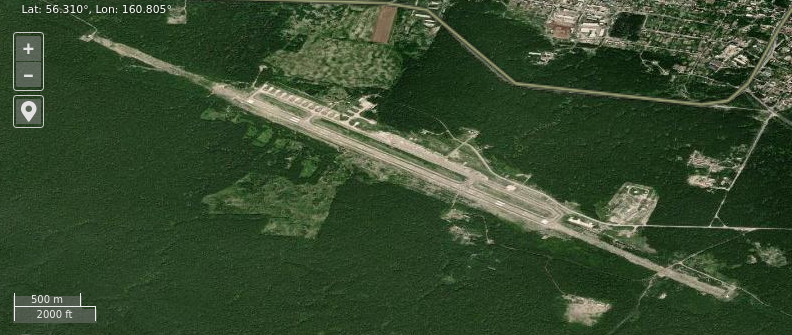
- Satellite imagery of Klyuchi air base

Site information
- Type: Air Base
- Owner: Ministry of Defence
- Operator: Russian Aerospace Forces
- Controlled by: 11th Air and Air Defence Forces Army

Location
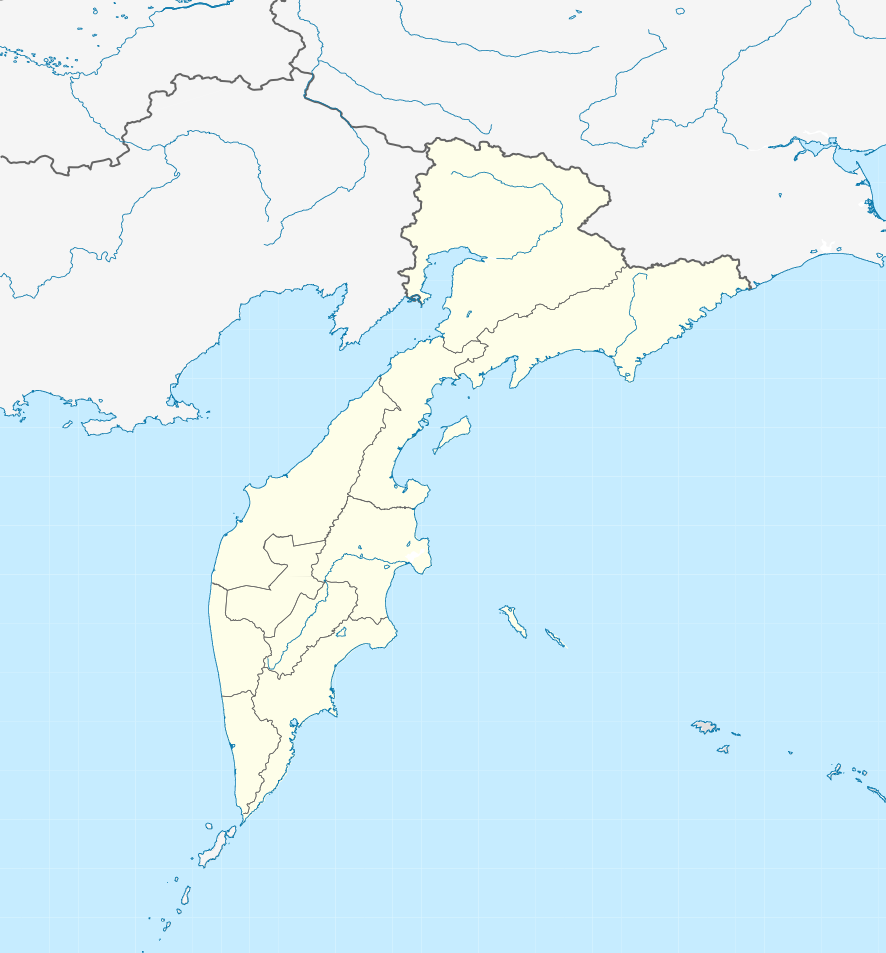
- Shown within Kamchatka Krai Klyuchi (Russia)
- Coordinates: 56°18′36″N 160°48′18″E

Site history
- Built: 1963
- In use: 1963 - present

Airfield information
- Identifiers: ICAO: XHPL
- Elevation: 152 metres (499 ft) AMSL
Runways
Direction	Length and surface
13/31	2,000 metres (6,562 ft) Concrete

Klyuchi Air Base is in Kamchatka Krai, Russia located 3 kilometers (1.9 mi) southwest of the settlement of Klyuchi. Aircraft and helicopters based here supported nearby missile testing operations at Kura Missile Test Range 130 km to the northeast. Klyuchi contains about twelve fighter revetments and some narrow tarmac space.

The 28th Independent Mixed Aviation Squadron attached to the 43rd independent Scientific-Experimental Station of the Strategic Rocket Forces was activated in October 1955.

Early US satellite imagery showed the airfield was constructed in 1963, replacing an old airfield about 10 miles (16 km) to the east-southeast. In another satellite pass in 1966, analysts saw mostly transports such as the Lisunov Li-2, an Antonov An-2 (ASCC: Colt), and a helicopter.

In 1969 the 28th Independent Mixed Aviation Squadron was upgraded into the 84th Independent Mixed Aviation Regiment.

In 2005 the missile experimental station was transferred to the Russian Space Forces.

The base is home to a Composite Aviation Squadron of the 35th Independent Transport Composite Aviation Regiment.

== See also ==
- List of military airbases in Russia
