= Muslyumovo =

One of several places in Russia

Muslyumovo (Russian: Муслюмово) is the name of several rural localities in Russia:

- Muslyumovo, Chelyabinsk Oblast, a selo in Chelyabinsk Oblast
- Muslyumovo, Aznakayevsky District, Republic of Tatarstan, a village in Aznakayevsky District of the Republic of Tatarstan
- Muslyumovo, Muslyumovsky District, Republic of Tatarstan, a selo in Muslyumovsky District of the Republic of Tatarstan

== See also ==
- zheleznodorozhnaya stantsiya Muslyumovo, a settlement in Chelyabinsk Oblast
