= Kondinskoye Airport =

Airport in Russia

- IATA: KXD; ICAO: USHK

Summary
- Airport type: Military
- Operator: Russian Air Force
- Elevation AMSL: 131 ft / 40 m
- Coordinates: 59°39′0″N 67°26′0″E
- Interactive map of Kondinskoye Airport

Runways
Direction	Length		Surface
Direction	ft	m	Surface
01/19	5,249	1,600

Kondinskoye Airport (Russian: Аэропорт Кондинское) (IATA: KXD, ICAO: USHK) is a minor airport in Russia.

== See also ==
- List of airports in Russia
