= Oryol Yuzhny Airport =

Airport in Oryol, Russia

Yuzhny Airport
- IATA: OEL; ICAO: UUOR

Summary
- Airport type: Public
- Location: Oryol
- Elevation AMSL: 656 ft / 200 m
- Coordinates: 52°56′6″N 36°0′6″E
- Interactive map of Yuzhny Airport

Runways
Direction	Length		Surface
Direction	ft	m	Surface
04/22	8,202	2,500	Asphalt

Yuzhny Airport (Russian: Аэропорт Южный) (IATA: OEL, ICAO: UUOR) is an airport in Russia located 6 km southwest of Oryol. It services small transports and has a considerable general aviation presence.

From the 1950s to the 1970s, it was a military airbase, with the based 472nd Fighter Aviation Regiment (PVO) flying respectively the Yak-17, MiG-15, MiG-17 and MiG-19.

== See also ==
- List of airports in Russia
