= Smolensk South Airport =

Former commercial airport of Smolensk, Russia

Smolensk South Airport Smolensk-Yuzhniy
- IATA: LNX; ICAO: UUBS

Summary
- Airport type: Public
- Location: Smolensk
- Elevation AMSL: 725 ft / 221 m
- Coordinates: 54°44′42″N 32°3′54″E

Map
- Location of airport in Smolensk Oblast

Runways
Direction	Length		Surface
Direction	ft	m	Surface
08/26	5,249	1,600	Concrete

Smolensk South Airport is the former aerodrome of Smolensk in Smolensk Oblast, Russia, located 2 km south of the city. It was a civilian airfield with a small tarmac runway, until it stopped operating commercially in the early 2000s. There are many stored An-2s and a disused DOSAAF area. Once the main airports of the city of Smolensk, it remains active only for sporting use.

The aerodrome was given to the regional division of the DOSAAF. The aerodrome operator is a Smolensk based aeroclub "Полёт" (Flight). The aerodrome is also the base of operations for "Smolenskaerotrans".

During its operational years planes as large as the Yak-40 and An-24 could land on the aerodrome. It could also accommodate any plane lighter than 24 tonnes, as well as any type of helicopter.

In 2008 the Smolensk Oblast government has put forward plans to modernise the airport and restart its commercial use.

It is not to be confused with the former military Smolensk North Airport 4 km north of the city.

== See also ==
- List of airports in Russia
