= Yelabuga North Airport =

Yelabuga North
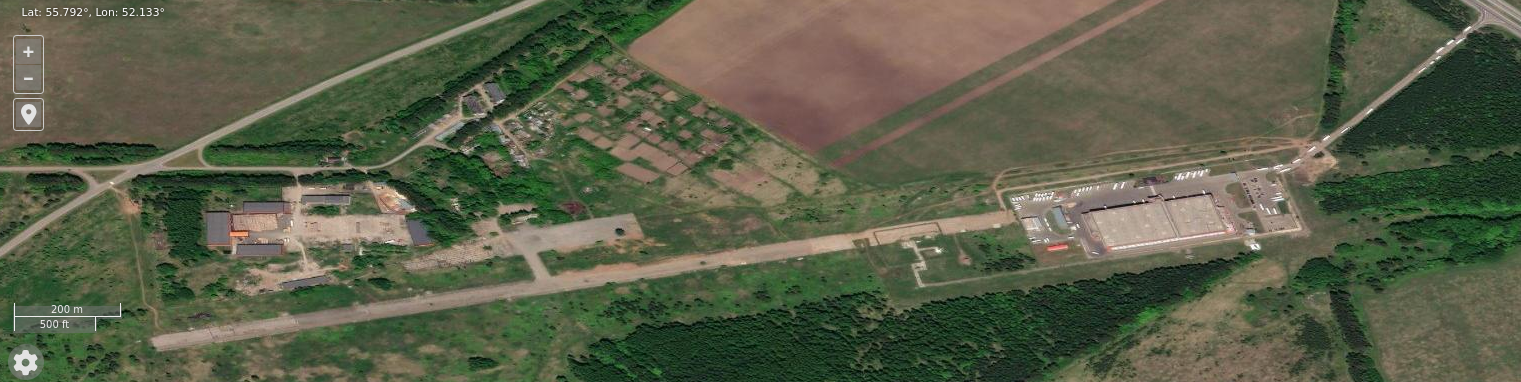
- Satellite imagery of Yelabuga North Airport
- IATA: none; ICAO: none

Summary
- Airport type: Public
- Location: Yelabuga
- Elevation AMSL: 518 ft / 158 m
- Coordinates: 55°47′30″N 52°8′0″E
- Interactive map of Yelabuga North

Runways
Direction	Length		Surface
Direction	ft	m	Surface
8/26	4,921	1,500	Asphalt

Yelabuga North is an airport in Russia located 5 km northeast of Yelabuga. It is a minor airfield with utility tarmac and some hangars. As of 2025 satellite imagery indicates that the runway is unusable.

== See also ==
- List of airports in Russia
