= Dudinka (inhabited locality) =

Dudinka (Russian: Дудинка) is the name of several inhabited localities in Russia.

Urban localities

- Dudinka, a town in Taymyrsky Dolgano-Nenetsky District of Krasnoyarsk Krai

Rural localities

- Dudinka, Oryol Oblast, a village in Druzhensky Selsoviet of Dmitrovsky District of Oryol Oblast
