= Uka Airport =

Airport in Russia

Uka Airport Ука Аэродром
- IATA: none; ICAO: none

Summary
- Airport type: Military
- Location: Uka, Russia
- Elevation AMSL: 10 ft / 3 m
- Coordinates: 57°55′42″N 162°1′18″E

Map
- Location of Uka Airport in Russia

Runways
Direction	Length		Surface
Direction	ft	m	Surface
18/36	7,218	2,200	Bitumen

Uka Airport was an airfield in Kamchatka Krai, Russia, located 11 km northwest of Uka. In recent decades, it was probably a civilian airfield, but the configuration and runway length suggests that it may have been a military airfield during the 1950s or 1960s. This airfield was used during the Second World War by US airplanes on their way to Siberia for Lend-Lease program. Near the airfield is a very big old antenna built for the Russian space programme in 1950s.

== See also ==
- List of airports in Russia
