= Klyuchi, Kamchatka Krai =

Settlement in Ust-Kamchatsky District, Kamchtka Krai, Russia

Coordinates: 56°19′N 160°50′E

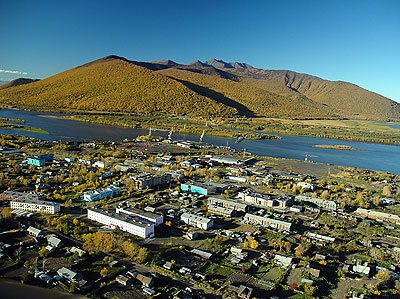
View of Klyuchi

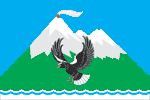
Flag of Klyuchi

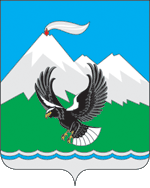
Coat of arms of Klyuchi

Klyuchi (Russian: Ключи́) is a rural locality (a settlement) in Ust-Kamchatsky District of Kamchatka Krai, Russia, located on the Kamchatka River, 30 kilometers (19 mi) to the north of Klyuchevskaya Sopka volcano. It had a population of 5,726 (2010 census); a marked decrease from that of 7,073 (2002 census); the population at its peak numbered 11,251 (1989 Soviet census).

== Geography ==
The settlement is located near the point where the course of the Kamchatka River turns from north to east.

== History ==
Klyuchi was founded in 1731. It was granted urban-type settlement status in 1951, and town status in 1979. In 2004, it was demoted to a rural locality in order to become eligible for increased funding from the Russian federal budget.

== Military ==
Klyuchi, being in a very isolated part of the former Soviet Union, has been near an intercontinental ballistic missile testing range since the Cold War, the Kura Missile Test Range, and is served by Klyuchi air base just southwest of the town. Klyuchi's original airfield consisted of a dirt airstrip and was located 13 kilometres (8 mi) east-southeast of the town. It was abandoned in the 1960s and is being reclaimed by forest.

== Transportation ==
There is a road connecting Klyuchi to Petropavlovsk-Kamchatskiy. Driving, according to Google Maps, can take as long as several hours.

== Climate ==
Klyuchi has a typical subarctic climate (Köppen climate classification Dfc), albeit with slight early dry-summer precipitation patterns. Summers are generally mild and rainy with cool nights, while winters are long, cold, and very snowy. Due to Klyuchi being located in the interior, the maritime influence is less than for Petropavlovsk-Kamchatsky and the nearest coastal locality of Ust-Kamchatsk.

Climate data for Klyuchi (1991–2020, extremes 1885-present)
| Month | Jan | Feb | Mar | Apr | May | Jun | Jul | Aug | Sep | Oct | Nov | Dec | Year |
|---|---|---|---|---|---|---|---|---|---|---|---|---|---|
| Record high °C (°F) | 5.8 (42.4) | 3.9 (39.0) | 7.4 (45.3) | 17.4 (63.3) | 28.4 (83.1) | 30.0 (86.0) | 33.1 (91.6) | 29.6 (85.3) | 25.0 (77.0) | 17.7 (63.9) | 11.6 (52.9) | 6.1 (43.0) | 33.1 (91.6) |
| Mean daily maximum °C (°F) | −12.0 (10.4) | −8.9 (16.0) | −3.1 (26.4) | 2.5 (36.5) | 10.4 (50.7) | 17.6 (63.7) | 21.1 (70.0) | 19.2 (66.6) | 14.1 (57.4) | 6.2 (43.2) | −2.4 (27.7) | −10.0 (14.0) | 4.2 (39.6) |
| Daily mean °C (°F) | −15.8 (3.6) | −13.1 (8.4) | −7.6 (18.3) | −1.5 (29.3) | 5.6 (42.1) | 12.2 (54.0) | 15.9 (60.6) | 14.4 (57.9) | 9.4 (48.9) | 2.7 (36.9) | −5.5 (22.1) | −13.5 (7.7) | −0.1 (31.8) |
| Mean daily minimum °C (°F) | −19.6 (−3.3) | −17.1 (1.2) | −12.1 (10.2) | −5.4 (22.3) | 1.3 (34.3) | 7.1 (44.8) | 11.3 (52.3) | 10.5 (50.9) | 5.5 (41.9) | −0.5 (31.1) | −8.7 (16.3) | −17.1 (1.2) | −4.1 (24.6) |
| Record low °C (°F) | −48.6 (−55.5) | −42.0 (−43.6) | −36.7 (−34.1) | −26.5 (−15.7) | −10.3 (13.5) | −3.7 (25.3) | 2.3 (36.1) | −1.3 (29.7) | −7.2 (19.0) | −19.3 (−2.7) | −33.8 (−28.8) | −42.2 (−44.0) | −48.6 (−55.5) |
| Average precipitation mm (inches) | 68 (2.7) | 59 (2.3) | 48 (1.9) | 32 (1.3) | 30 (1.2) | 38 (1.5) | 49 (1.9) | 67 (2.6) | 50 (2.0) | 66 (2.6) | 65 (2.6) | 60 (2.4) | 632 (24.9) |
| Average rainy days | 0 | 0 | 0 | 0.3 | 8 | 16 | 17 | 19 | 17 | 12 | 1 | 0.2 | 110 |
| Average snowy days | 20 | 18 | 18 | 10 | 2 | 0 | 0 | 0 | 0 | 3 | 14 | 19 | 104 |
| Average relative humidity (%) | 83 | 80 | 75 | 70 | 68 | 70 | 77 | 81 | 79 | 76 | 79 | 84 | 77 |
| Mean monthly sunshine hours | 51.0 | 92.3 | 160.1 | 205.0 | 225.0 | 235.0 | 234.6 | 182.0 | 168.0 | 129.0 | 76.1 | 42.0 | 1,800.1 |
Source 1: Pogoda.ru.net
Source 2: NOAA
