= Taskayeva =

Taskayeva Таскаева
- Village
- Location within Perm Krai Location within Russia
- Coordinates: 58°55′N 53°55′E
- Country: Russia
- Region: Perm Krai
- District: Kudymkarsky District
- Time zone: UTC+5:00

Taskayeva (Russian: Таскаева) is a rural locality (a village) in Verkh-Invenskoye Rural Settlement, Kudymkarsky District, Perm Krai, Russia. The population was 1 as of 2010.

== Geography ==
It is located 52 km west from Kudymkar.
