= Velikiye Luki Airport =

Airport in Velikiye Luki, Russia

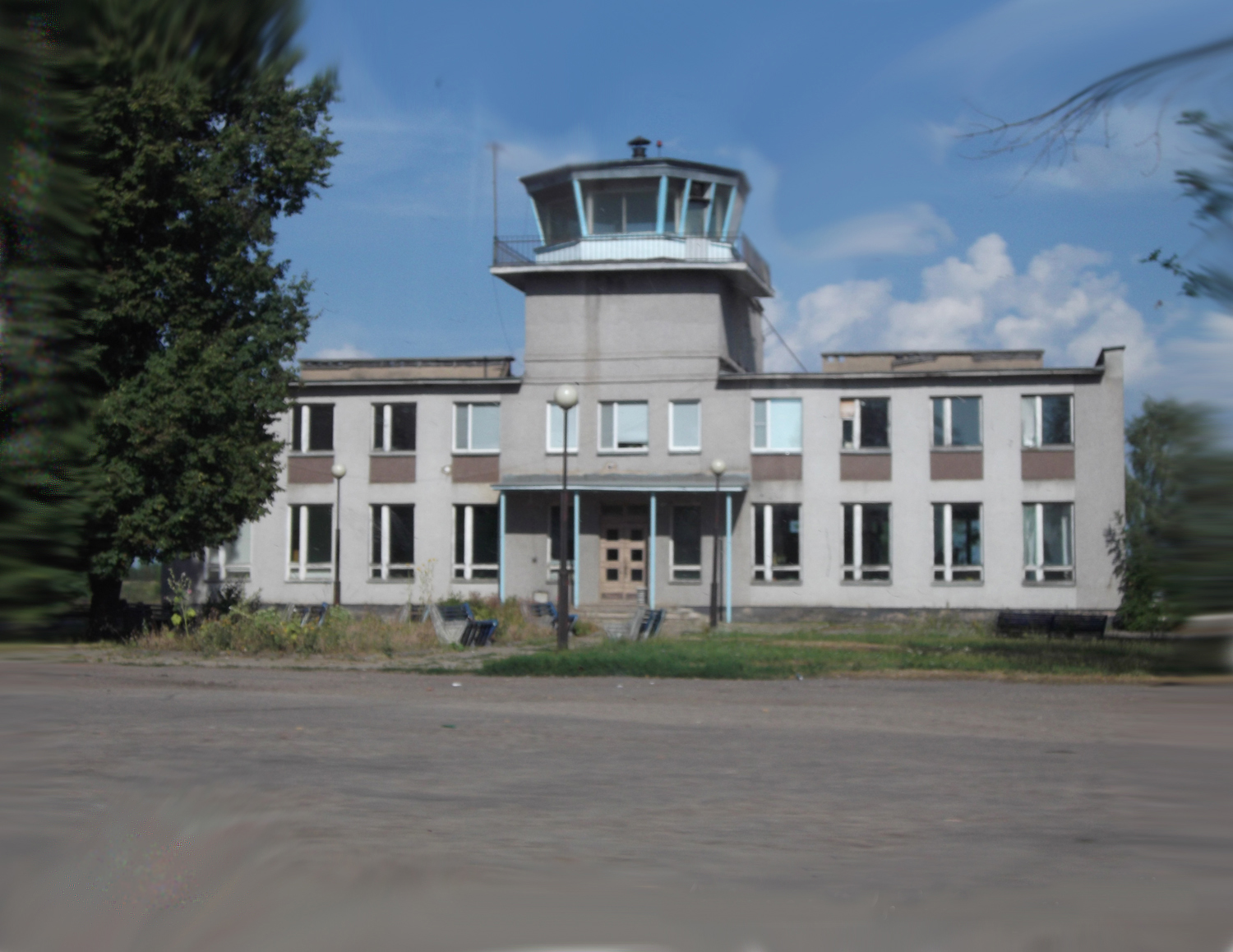
- IATA: VLU; ICAO: ULOL

Summary
- Airport type: Public
- Location: Velikiye Luki
- Elevation AMSL: 328 ft (100 m)
- Coordinates: 56°22′54″N 30°36′36″E
- Interactive map of Velikiye Luki Airport

Runways
| Direction | Length | | Surface |
| Direction | ft | m | Surface |
|---|---|---|---|
| 15/33 | 4,665 | 1,422 | Asphalt |

Velikiye Luki Airport (Russian: Аэропорт Великие Луки) (IATA: VLU, ICAO: ULOL) is a suspended airport in Russia located 7 km (4.3 mi) northeast of Velikiye Luki.

From the mid-1920s until 1936, it was used as a stopover airport by the Soviet-German airline Deruluft en route between Berlin and Moscow.

Until the mid-1990s, it was used to accommodate small civilian airliners servicing regional scheduled flights.

In 2020, a discussion on resuming flights took place with the governor of Pskov oblast.

== See also ==
- List of airports in Russia
