= Tasayevo Airport =

Tasayevo
- IATA: none; ICAO: none

Summary
- Airport type: Public
- Location: Taseyevo
- Elevation AMSL: 299 ft (91 m)
- Coordinates: 57°10′30″N 94°53′24″E
- Interactive map of Tasayevo

Runways
Direction	Length		Surface
Direction	ft	m	Surface
	4,265	1,300	Concrete

Tasayevo Airport is an airport in Russia located 5 km south of Taseyevo. It is a small civilian airfield, with no taxiways and a small parking tarmac.

== See also ==
- List of airports in Russia
