= Baherove (air base) =

Baherove Air Base "Багерове авіабаза"
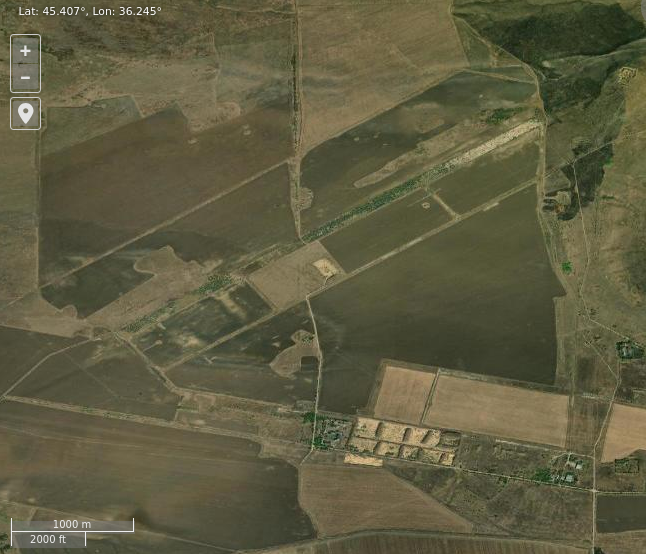
- Satellite imagery of the former Baherove airbase
- IATA: none; ICAO: UKFR

Summary
- Airport type: Military
- Operator: Russian Air Force (2014-2016)
- Location: Baherove, Crimea
- Elevation AMSL: 364 ft / 115 m
- Coordinates: 45°24′25″N 36°14′41″E

Maps
- Location of Baherove Air Base in Crimea
- Interactive map of Baherove Air Base

Runways
Direction	Length		Surface
Direction	ft	m	Surface
06/24	11,483	3,500	Concrete

Baherove Air Base (Ukrainian: Багерове авіабаза, Russian: Багерово авиабаза; also Bagarovo or Bagerovo) is an air base in Baherove, Crimea. It is located 3 km northwest of Baherove village, and 14 km northwest of Kerch. The airfield is an "out-of-class" airport, which can accommodate aircraft of all types. The airfield was abandoned in 1996.

== History ==
Baherove Air Base was the 71st Air Force training ground, also known as "Polygon". It was established in Baherove on August 21, 1947 by USSR Council of Ministers resolution. The base was created to provide security for nuclear testing and refining delivery methods for nuclear warheads, mainly via aviation. The first atomic charges were designed for aerial bombs, compatible with long-range bomber Tu-4. The 35th Bomber Aviation Regiment was involved in the testing.

A fighter regiment was attached to the 71st Air Force Test Range until the 1960s.

The airfield had a 3.5 km (2.2 mi) concrete runway, 100m (328ft) wide, which still stands. It was one of the USSR's three airstrips built for the space shuttle Buran.

In 1973, the Voroshilovgrad Higher Military Aviation School of Navigators opened a branch there, training personnel for front-line and Army Aviation, including navigators. The 228th Training Aviation Regiment (military unit 25570) was established at the base in 1977, equipped with MiG-21 fighters and L-29 training aircraft. The former 71st range's sea area was used for anti-submarine aviation navigator training (training for dropping sonar buoys from aircraft Be-12).

The runway was updated in the late 1980s with a standard PAG-18 concrete surface layer. The branch and school were transferred to Ukrainian Air Force in 1992 and dissolved in 1996, with the garrison falling into neglect.

After Russia's annexation of the peninsula in 2014, the air base was dismantled by Russian authorities in 2016 and only two partially intact taxiways remain.

== See also ==
- List of Soviet Air Force bases
