= Snezhnogorsk, Krasnoyarsk Krai =

Snezhnogorsk Снежногорск
- Urban-type settlement
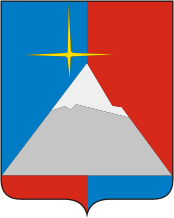
- Coat of arms
- Interactive map of Snezhnogorsk
- Location of Snezhnogorsk Snezhnogorsk (Krasnoyarsk Krai)
- Coordinates: 68°05′24″N 87°46′47″E
- Country: Russia
- Federal subject: Krasnoyarsk Krai
- Founded: 1963
- Urban-type settlement status since: 1964

Area
  - Total: 1.7 km^{2} (0.66 sq mi)

Population (2010 Census)
  - Total: 887
  - Estimate (2021): 784 (−11.6%)
  - Density: 520/km^{2} (1,400/sq mi)

Administrative status
  - Subordinated to: krai city of Norilsk
- Time zone: UTC+7 (MSK+4)
- Postal code: 663335
- OKTMO ID: 04729000056

Snezhnogorsk (Russian: Снежного́рск) is an urban locality (an urban-type settlement) under the administrative jurisdiction of Tsentralny City District of the krai city of Norilsk in Norilsk Urban District, Krasnoyarsk Krai, Russia.

== History ==
Snezhnogorsk was founded in 1963 as a settlement for the workers building the Ust-Khantaika hydroelectric plant.

Snezhnogorsk got its name during construction, when the first house built was covered with snow up to the roof. The status of an urban-type settlement has been granted in 1964. The city-forming enterprise is Ust-Khantai Hydroelectric Power Station with a capacity of 451 MW.

== Transportation ==
Snezhnogorsk is a remote settlement with no ground transport available to reach it. The settlement is connected by air with Norilsk and Igarka. In 2006, the airport located in the village was disbanded and the terminal building was burned down. Airplane communication between Snezhnogorsk and Norilsk thence ceased to exist. Helicopter flights are operated weekly on Tuesdays and Thursdays by the airline Norilsk Avia JSC on the route Norilsk - Snezhnogorsk - Norilsk. From October 1, 2007, 2 times a month, the company operates Turukhanavia helicopter flights on the route Igarka - Snezhnogorsk - Igarka.

== Population history ==
Historical population
Year	Pop.	±%
1970	9,685	—
1979	2,852	−70.6%
1989	2,206	−22.7%
2002	1,306	−40.8%
2010	887	−32.1%
2021	784	−11.6%
Source: Censuses
