= Kerch Airport =

Kerch Airport Аеропорт «Керч»
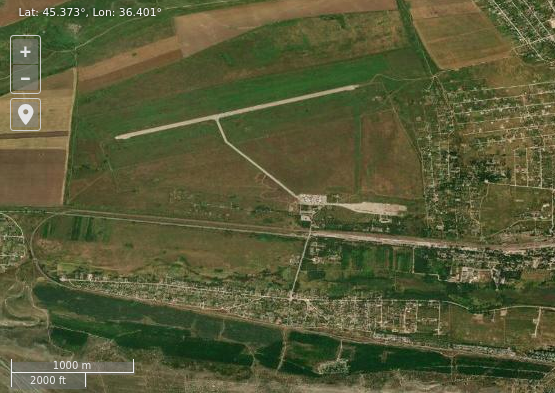
- Satellite imagery of Kerch Airport
- IATA: KHC; ICAO: URFK

Summary
- Airport type: Public
- Owner: Local government
- Location: Kerch, Crimea
- Elevation AMSL: 171 ft (52 m)
- Coordinates: 45°22′21″N 36°24′05″E

Maps
- Location of Kerch Airport in Crimea
- Interactive map of Kerch Airport

Runways
Direction	Length		Surface
Direction	ft	m	Surface
07/25	5,420	1,652	Asphalt
07/25	6,561	2,000	Soil

Kerch Airport (Ukrainian: Аеропорт «Керч», Russian: Аэропорт «Керчь») (IATA: KHC, ICAO: URFK) is an airport in Kerch, Crimea. The airport is located 1.5 km northwest of the city (sometimes confused with the nearby Baherove Air Base). The airport is currently bankrupt, and was put on sale for 27 million UAH (3.3 million USD) by the city authorities.

== History ==
Though the airport is bankrupt, it is still in service and is used by general aviation today. The airport itself is not in good condition. The runway needs repair, airport facilities are bad, and there is a working ATC tower which needs improvements. There are no airline services to this airport.

Airline flights to/from the airport ceased operations in 2008, formerly encountering approximately 8-10 flights per day, both domestic and international. From 2005 to 2006, the airport tried to resume flights to Kyiv and Moscow using Motor Sich Airlines, but expenses were high and profit was too low, which made flying unprofitable.

=== Accidents and incidents ===
On 13 November 1971, an Aeroflot Antonov 24B (CCCP-46378) struck a pylon of an electrical transmission line and crashed on approach. There were a total of 5 passengers and crew aboard who all died on impact. The aircraft was damaged beyond repair.

== See also ==
- List of airports in Ukraine
