= Magan, Russia =

Magan Маган Маҕан (Yakut)
- Selo
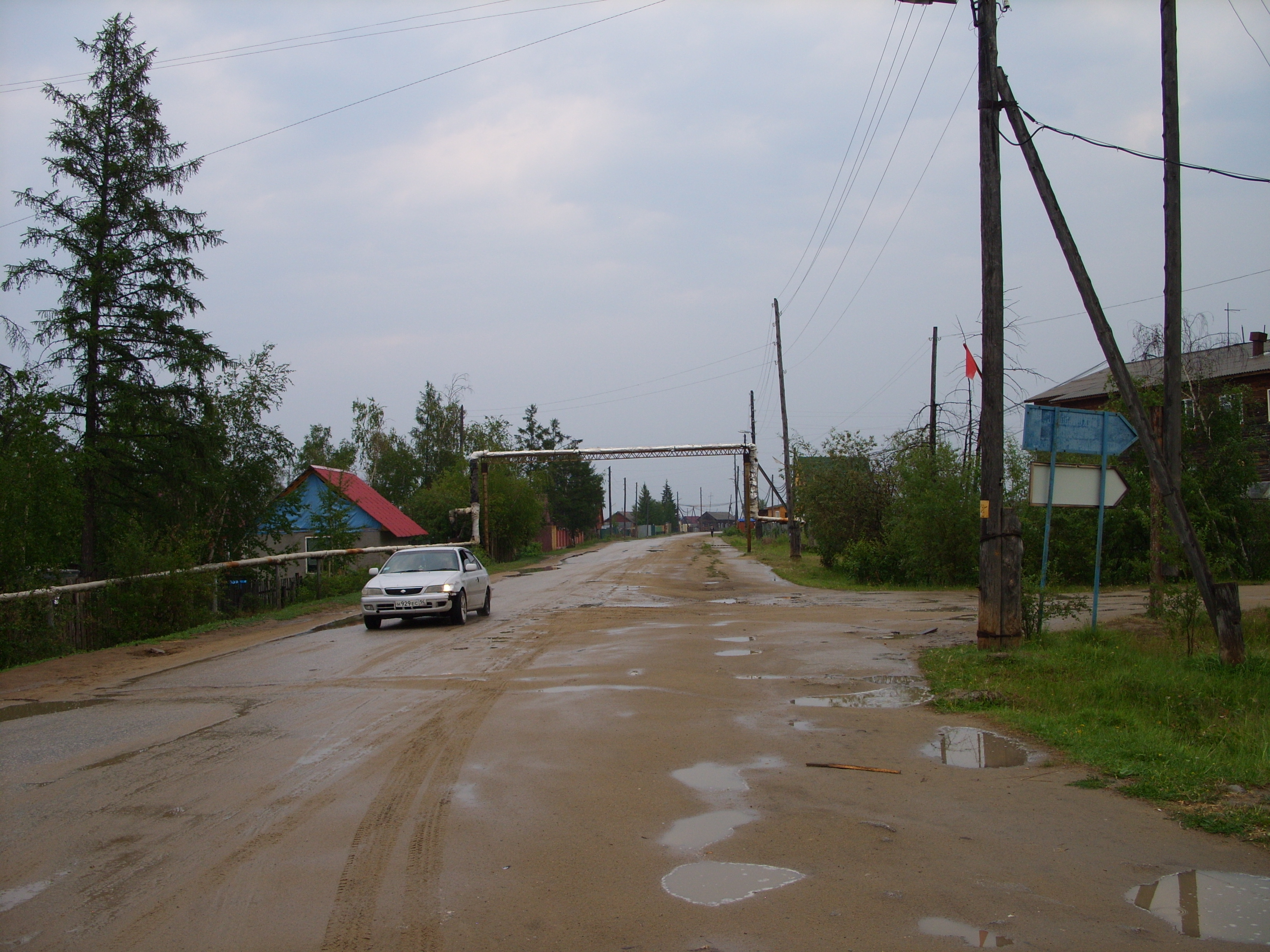
- Street view, Magan
- Interactive map of Magan
- Location of Magan Magan (Sakha Republic)
- Coordinates: 62°06′N 129°32′E
- Country: Russia
- Federal subject: Sakha Republic
- Elevation: 207 m (679 ft)

Population (2010 Census)
  - Total: 1,863
  - Estimate (2021): 2,129 (+14.3%)

Administrative status
  - Subordinated to: city of republic significance of Yakutsk

Municipal status
  - Municipal district: Yakutsk Urban Okrug
- Time zone: UTC+9 (MSK+6)
- Postal code: 677904
- OKTMO ID: 98701000106

Magan (Russian: Мага́н; Yakut: Маҕан, Mağan) is a rural locality (a selo) under the administrative jurisdiction of the city of republic significance of Yakutsk in the Sakha Republic, Russia. Its population as of the 2010 Census was 1,863; up from 1,743 recorded in the 2002 Census. Poet Natalia Kharlampieva is a native of Magan.
