= Dudinka Airport =

- IATA: none; ICAO: UOOD

Summary
- Airport type: Public
- Operator: JSC "Air Company "Taimyr Air Company"
- Elevation AMSL: 82 ft / 25 m
- Coordinates: 69°22′30″N 86°9′24″E
- Interactive map of Dudinka Airport

Runways
Direction	Length		Surface
Direction	ft	m	Surface
01/19	4,770	1,454	Concrete

Dudinka Airport (Russian: Аэропорт "Дудинка") (ICAO: UOOD) is a small airport in Krasnoyarsk krai, Russia located 3 kilometres (1.9 mi) south of Dudinka. It services small transport aircraft.

== See also ==
- List of airports in Russia
