= Uka (village) =

Former rural locality in Karaginsky District, Russia

Coordinates: 57°50′42″N 162°06′03″E

Uka (Russian: Ука) was a rural locality (a selo) in Karaginsky District of Koryak Autonomous Okrug, Soviet Union, located near the mouth of the Uka River, on the shore of the Bering Sea. It was served by Uka Airport. The village was abolished on December 13, 1974 as it was depopulated.
