= Feodorovskaya Icon Cathedral (Saint Petersburg) =

- Храм Фео́доровской ико́ны Бо́жией Ма́тери в память 300-летия До́ма Рома́новых
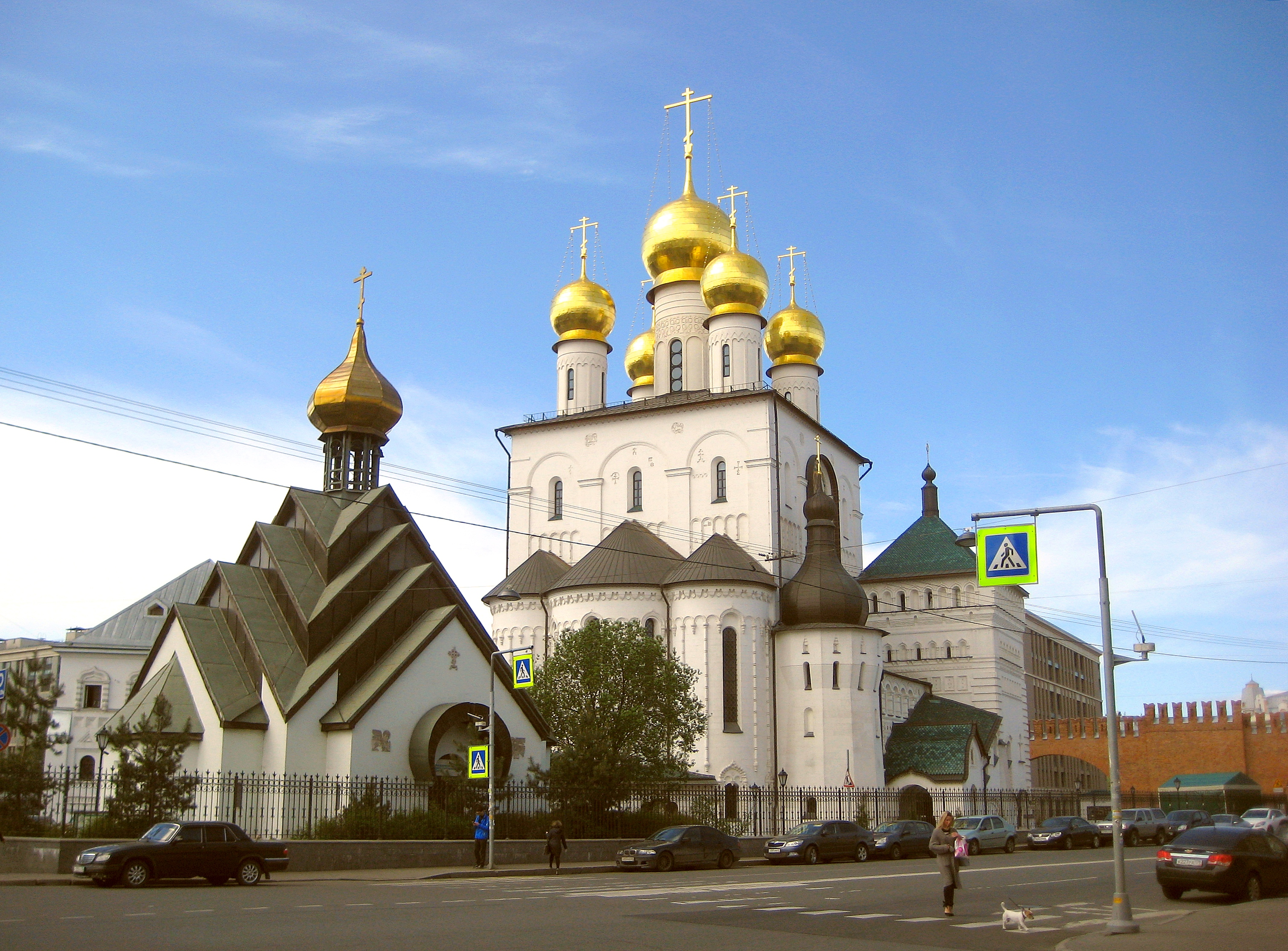
- Feodorovskaya Icon Cathedral in St. Petersburg (eastern and northern façades, viewed from Mirgorodskaya Street, summer 2017)
- Feodorovskaya Icon Cathedral
- 59°55′33″N 30°22′07″E
- Location: Saint Petersburg
- Country: Russia
- Denomination: Russian Orthodox
- Website: https://feosobor.ru

History
- Founded: 1904
- Founder: Archimandrite Alexy (Yakovlev)
- Dedication: Feodorovskaya Icon of the Mother of God
- Dedicated: 1911
- Consecrated: 1914

Architecture
- Functional status: functioning
- Architect: Stepan Krichinsky
- Style: Russian Revival architecture

Feodorovskaya Icon Cathedral (also Cathedral of Our Lady Feodorovskaya, Russian: Феодоровский собор) — an Orthodox church in Saint Petersburg, Russia. It belongs to the Central Deanery of the St. Petersburg Diocese of the Russian Orthodox Church. The cathedral was built in Commemoration of the Romanov Tercentenary.

The reinforced concrete building was designed in the style of the Rostov cathedral churches of the era of the accession of Tsar Mikhail Fedorovich Romanov according to the project of Stepan Krichinsky (Russian: Степа́н Само́йлович Кричи́нский, 1874–1923).

== History ==
=== Prehistory (end of 19th – beginning of 20th century) ===
From the end of the 19th century until the revolutionary events of the year 1917, the land on which the church is situated today belonged to the town residence of the Feodorovsky Gorodetsky monastery of the Nizhny Novgorod diocese.

For several decades in the late 19th – early 20th century, thanks to the efforts of the Abbot Archimandrite Alexy (Yakovlev), the town residence gradually increased its presence in Saint-Petersburg. First, an icon case with Feodorovskaya Icon of the Mother of God and an icon of St. Alexander Nevsky was installed in the 3rd class passenger hall of the Nikolayevsky railway station.

Then permission was given to erect a stone chapel near the gate of the goods depot. The chapel project was submitted for approval of Emperor Alexander III, and he suggested to build a church instead of the chapel. Thus in 1904, a small church of the Feodorovskaya Icon of the Mother of God and of St. Alexius, Metropolitan of Moscow, was consecrated in memory of the birth of Tsarevich Alexei. It stood approximately in the place where the brick-red "Kremlin" wall is located today.

However, Abbot Alexy was not content and in 1906 he petitioned to expand the territory of the town residence of Gorodetsky monastery for the construction of a new spacious church "because of the tightness of the Aleksievskaya Church". By 1909, the concept was "to construct a stately monument to the successful 300-year reign of the Romanov Dynasty", as stated in the petition addressed to the St. Petersburg Metropolitan bishop.

The Construction Committee was headed by major-general of His Majesty's council Dmitri Yakovlevich Dashkov, and worked under the patronage of Grand Duke Michail Alexandrovich, the Emperor's brother.

=== Construction and Early Service (1909–1917) ===
The Romanov Tercentenary Church was to combine traditional forms of ancient Russian architecture with modern technologies of the time. One of the major conditions posed to the competing architects was that the appearance of the Church should contain visual references to the time of the beginning of the reign of the Romanov dynasty, i.e. to the architecture of the Muscovite Russia at the beginning of the 17th century.

Of the three winners in the competition of projects, Stepan Samoilovich Krichinsky's project was selected.

The collection of funds for the construction of the church began. The first donation of 100 rubles was contributed by the Holy Righteous John of Kronstadt as he lay on his deathbed. The Emperor provided 25,000 rubles. Funds were raised by monasteries, government agencies, educational institutions, military units, railway, city and provincial councils, banks and other public institutions. Private donations were also collected.

Ceremonial laying of the cathedral foundation took place on August 5, 1911, after site preparation and the erection of supporting framework for the building. The short time available necessitated constant adjustment of the building plans. Not surprisingly, the main event – the consecration of the upper Church – took place later than planned, on January 15, 1914. It was headed by the Metropolitan bishop of Saint Petersburg, Vladimir (Bogoyavlensky), the future first new martyr, in the presence of Emperor Nicholas II, members of the royal family, the Government, the State Duma, the students of educational institutions and the military.

World War I affected the construction and decoration plans for the cathedral and other buildings in its premises. However, the Clergy house was built in 1915–1916. It was demolished in 1960-s and has been restored on its historical place next to the cathedral in keeping with the few surviving drawings and the only old photograph.

=== The Parish Church (1918–1932) ===
After the Revolution of 1917, the Construction Committee ceased to exist. The church itself no longer was a monastic metochion (an ecclesiastical embassy church) and received the status of a parish church.

The parish life in these years was closely tied to the activity of the Alexander Nevsky Brotherhood that existed in Petrograd-Leningrad in the 1920s and early 1930s. The Brotherhood was engaged in active missionary, educational and charitable work despite the hostile environment of the Soviet state. The last Abbot of the Feodorovsky Cathedral before its closure, Archimandrite Lev (Egorov), was one of the leaders of the Brotherhood. Archimandrite Lev was arrested together with many other members of the Brotherhood in February 1932. He was sentenced to 10 years in a Correctional labour camp. There he was charged again with counter-revolutionary activities, sentenced to death and shot on September 20, 1937. Nowadays the Church revers him in the host of the New Martyrs and Confessors of the Russian Orthodox Church.

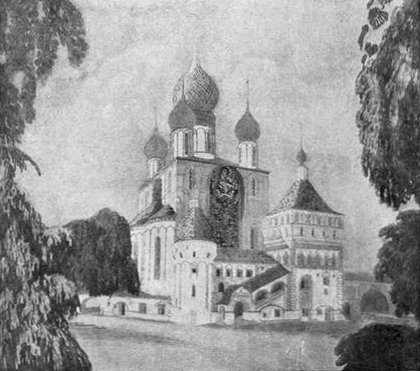
Feodorovsky cathedral in Saint Petersburg. Newspaper Novoe Vremya, March 1911. No. 12578

=== Milk Plant (1932–2005) ===
The parish ceased to exist by decision of the executive committee of Leningrad Region dated May 10, 1932. Authorities considered "the Romanov Church ... suitable for the milk plant Soyuzmoloko", which determined the fate of the Feodorovsky сathedral building for more than seventy years. During this time it was reconstructed to meet factory needs – its outer and inner appearances were changed almost beyond recognition. As a result, the original two-storey five-domed сathedral was turned into an almost cubic five-storey industrial building, surrounded by chaotically added brick annexes, the footprint of which was almost as big as that of the сathedral.

=== Return to Church and Start of Reconstruction (1992–2006) ===
In the early 1990s it was decided to evict the milk plant from the Feodorovsky сathedral building and return the building to the St. Petersburg diocese, but it took 13 years to implement this decision.

Meanwhile, parish life revived. In 1998 on the ground assigned nearby, a Chapel of the Holy New Martyrs and Confessors of Russia was built, where regular worship began. Parishioners and benefactors donated their work, time and money and the church was filled with prayer and Christian communication.

On August 4, 2005, the parish took over the Feodorovsky cathedral building which lay waste with stinking, dirty, cluttered and badly heated rooms. Walls were tiled and there was almost no running water or sewerage.

Over a year and a half a number of former factory premises were repaired and the parish launched there educational activities. On the second floor (Upper church) under the low factory ceiling, worship services took place for a total of two years from August 28, 2005, to August 29, 2007. Restoring the original layout and decoration of the cathedral would require huge financial investments.

=== Restoration (2007–2013) ===
At the end of 2006 Boris Gryzlov, than the Chairman of the State Duma of the Russian Federation, visited the church and accepted the offer of the Metropolitan bishop of St. Petersburg and Ladoga Vladimir to establish and to head a board of trustees for the restoration of the cathedral.

Restoration began in the summer of 2007 and lasted for six years without ceasing even for one day. The scope of work to be done in the cathedral building which for decades was used as an industrial enterprise was formidable. On the upside, the restoration process allowed for correction of some deficiencies and shortcomings that occurred during the initial construction process.

The restoration works were funded every year from different sources: both public (Federal and Municipal budgets) and private. The Board of Trustees managed to attract major donors, so a range of works not covered by State programs became possible, including the purchase of the Soviet era building which was later recreated as the historic Clergy house. The congregation itself raised funds for the painting of new icons and restoration of church utensils.

The restoration project was designed by the architectural and restoration workshop No. 5 Research Institute Spetsproektrestavratsiya (St Petersburg). Restoration works were performed by companies Resma, Vympel and Promproject (Moscow), as well as Construction culture (St Petersburg). The design and installation of new engineering networks was made by the company Telros (St Petersburg).

During the first two and a half years of restoration (2007—2009) all the traces of the former factory were eliminated: annexes, floors, dilapidated engineering networks. Old ceilings in the Lower and Upper churches were replaced and the basement was waterproofed. The five domes of the cathedral with their new golden cupolas were returned to their places prior to the Festival of Patrons on August 29, 2009.

In 2010–2011 all the facilities of the basement, as well as of the Lower and Upper churches were recreated and decorated, some roofs were tiled and others covered with copper; new engineering networks were constructed, the Bell Tower was restored, work on reconstruction of the inner pictorial decoration and the liturgical utensils of the cathedral started.

In the autumn of the year 2011 in the Lower church a marble altar was erected under the guidance of Archimandrite Zinon (Theodore). All the eleven bells of "Romanovsky ringing" were recreated, to sound for the first time on March 27, 2011, for the feast of the Feodorovskaya Icon.

During the year 2012 an intense effort was made to re-establish the white-stoned facades of the cathedral, including the majolica panel. Decoration work inside the church was in full swing; the interior items, the five-tier iconostasis of the Upper church and many other things were recreated.

Its centennial anniversary of the construction, year 2013, the cathedral met restored and redecorated.

== Appearance ==
Built in neo-Russian style by architect Stepan Krichinsky, the Feodorovsky cathedral recalls famous examples of the Old Russian church architecture. The architectural motives of the churches and towers of historical Russian cities: Rostov, Yuryev-Polsky, Yaroslavl, Suzdal, can be recognized in the overall silhouette of the cathedral and its separate parts and details.

The use of Old Russian designs in the architecture of the cathedral did not preclude use of advanced construction technology from the early 20th century. The cathedral stands on a firm and stable base – a solid concrete foundation slab. The main framework consists of four arches, also made of reinforced concrete, which form the skeleton of the building. The arches support the central dome. The intersection of the two pairs of arches is clearly visible from below in the space inside the dome of the Upper church.

An important stylistic feature of the cathedral is multiple asymmetry. Each of the three towers on the perimeter of the cathedral looks different: the North East tower is octagonal with a bulbous copper dome; the North West tower is noticeably higher and wider with a square base and a four-sided tile roof; the South West tower is also square, but smaller with a more elongated peaked roof. Equally diverse are the rooftops of the Feodorovsky cathedral, partly coated with copper, partly with tiles of a deep emerald colour. The domes of the cathedral, according to the original project, were to be gilded, but in fact it was done only during the restoration.

The exterior walls of the cathedral are coated with white "staritsky stone" – limestone, decorated with various carvings, including mythical animals: a Unicorn, a Phoenix, a Double-headed eagle, a Sirin-bird, and among them a Lion.

In accordance with the canon law of the Orthodox Church, the altar of the cathedral is oriented to the east. However, the main entrance is not located on the opposite, western side, but opens onto Mirgorodskaya Street. Thus, the main facade is the northern facade of the cathedral, on which the main external decoration of the cathedral is located – an eight-meter majolica panel "Intercession of the Mother of God over the Reigning House".

The majolica panel was completely destroyed in Soviet times and had to be recreated. The panel depicts Feodorovskaya Icon of the Mother of God at the top of a symbolical tree of Russian holiness. In the branches of the tree there are the saints: Peter and Alexius of Moscow, Fyodor of Uglich and Joasaph of Belgorod, noble princes Andrey Bogolyubsky and Alexander Nevsky, Tsarevich Dmitry of Uglich, Byzantine saint Michael Malein (patron saint of Tsar Mikhail Fyodorovich Romanov), Sergius of Radonezh, Zosima and Sabbatius of Solovky, Barlaam of Khutyn, Seraphim of Sarov, Euphrosyne of Suzdal and Anna of Kashin. In the lower part of the panel, the figures of Patriarch Filaret and his son, Tsar Mikhail Fedorovich Romanov, rise above the walls of the Ipatievsky Monastery in Kostroma.

In the upper part of the majolica before the icon stand the Great martyr Theodore Stratelates, after whom the Fyodorovskaya Icon got its name, and the Hieromartyr Hypatius of Gangra, after whom the Ipatievsky Monastery in Kostroma was named. The figure of Hypatius, oddly enough, was indicated in the report of the Construction Committee of 1915, as "Rev. Hypatius of Kostroma", although there was no such person known.

The majolica theme is continued in many square colored tiles placed on the white-stoned Northern and Western facades.

Another noteworthy detail of the front facade of Feodorovsky cathedral is a mosaic icon "The Vernicle Image of the Saviour", which was also destroyed and had to be recreated.

The main entrance to the temple is made in the form of "The Tsar's Porch" – an open porch with a tile roof and the ogee arch which relies on a massive spherical "kubyshka" column.

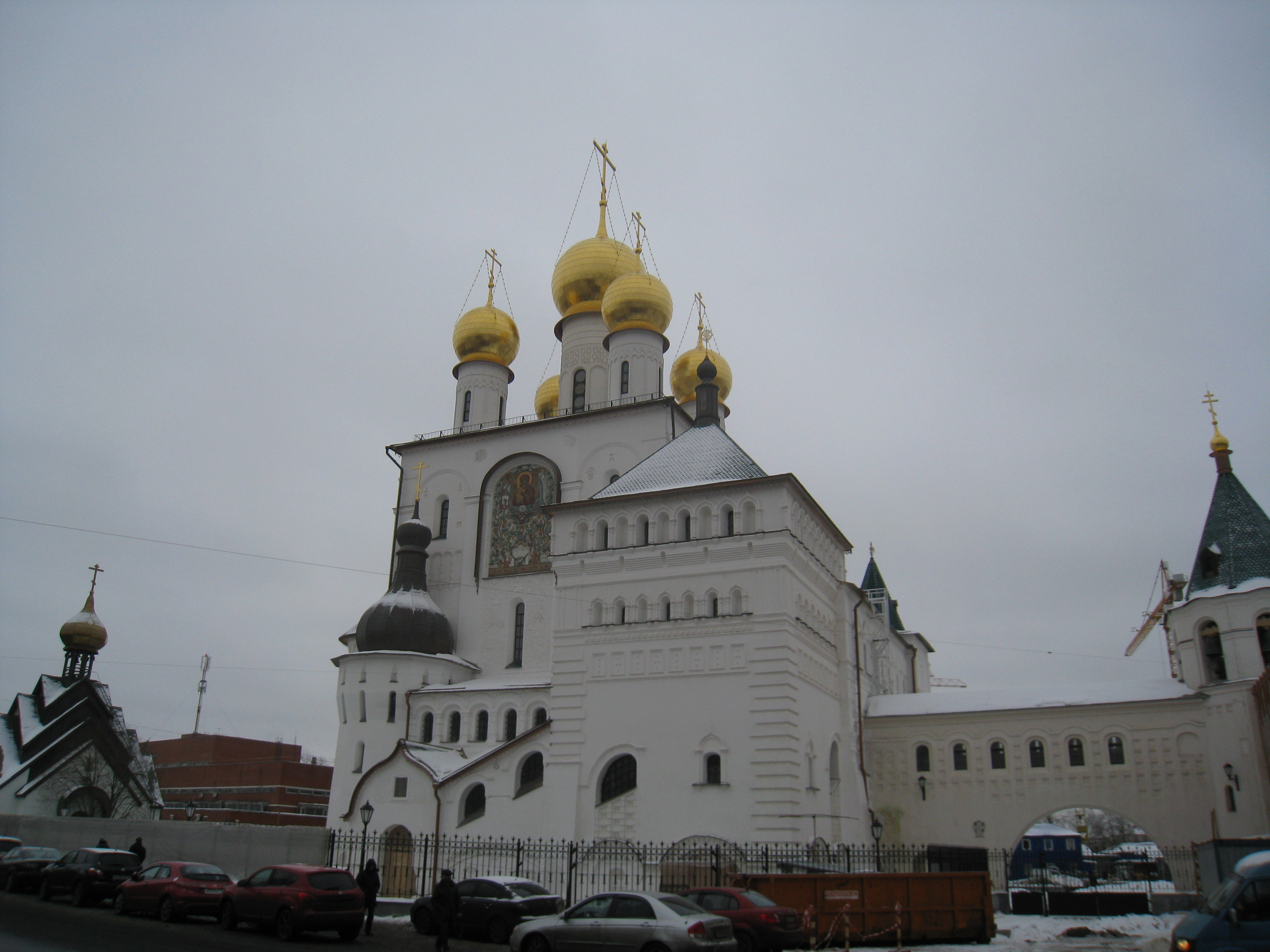
Fedorovsky cathedral in Saint-petersburg. Northern facade, majolica, Tsar's staircase. January 2013.

Two pair of doors lead separately into the Upper and Lower churches. Their massive wings, covered with copper, are decorated with a complex combination of panels incorporating bronze rosettes of various patterns. The doors leading to the Upper church depict scenes of the Twelve Great Feasts. The doors were newly made and replaced the destroyed original ones.

A broad marble staircase leads from the Tsar's Porch to the Upper Church. It was recreated in our time to replace the original one which was destroyed during the Soviet years. Originally the walls of the Tsar's stairs were decorated with scenes from sacred history in the style of the old Yaroslavl and Rostov paintings of the 17th century. These were the only murals in the cathedral – its internal volume was never painted. Today, the original painting can be seen in the form of fragments cleared during the restoration (lower part of the stairs), or in two archival photographs (upper part). Most of the old paintings perished under the tiles which lined the walls of the Soviet factory. The fragments that can be seen today is all that the restorers managed to clear and save.

== Interior ==
=== Lower Church ===
The Lower church is dedicated to the Holy Right-Believing Prince Alexander Nevsky and the Holy Equal-to-apostles Mary Magdalene, the heavenly patrons of Emperor Alexander III and his wife, Empress Maria Feodorovna.

Originally the side aisles were to be dedicated to the righteous Philaretos the Merciful and the martyr Martha, whose names were accepted by parents of Mikhail Fedorovich Romanov after they became monks. After the restoration of the Lower church this idea was honored by painting the icons of these saints for the donation of the parishioners.

In the decoration of the Lower church, the builders intended to imitate the style of Novgorod churches of the 13th century, which would be reminiscent of the Alexander Nevsky times. It was stated in the report of the Construction Committee from 1917: "The middle altar of the Lower church is dedicated to the Holy Right-Believing Prince Alexander Nevsky, who lived in the 13th century. In ancient churches, instead of iconostases, stone altar barriers were used, which is why the Committee considered it desirable to build a stone iconostasis in the Lower church in the form of an altar barrier, as well as Holy Table (altar), Table of Oblation, Golgotha and Tomb from the same material..."

This plan was never implemented. Among the large number of photographs and archival materials that have been preserved for the cathedral, there was not a single photograph or drawing of the Lower church.

Today, the Lower church is designed and decorated both in accordance with the wishes of its original founders, and in accordance with the modern liturgical needs of the Church. The renown contemporary icon painter Archimandrite Zinon (Theodore) took over the general artistic direction for the design of the Lower church. The project of the altar barrier and frescoes in the altar apses proposed by him was approved by the church authorities, the board of trustees and endorsed by the authorities for the protection of cultural heritage in St. Petersburg. The frescoes were made by Archimandrite Zinon himself, and the icons for the Lower church were painted by him and by artists whom he recommended.

Archival photographs of the utensils of the cathedral greatly helped in choosing the style of decoration of the Lower church. They are beautiful items in the Art Nouveau style of the early 20th century, containing distinct appeals to early Christian samples.

The entire interior of the Lower church is subordinated to the main function for which Christian churches have been built since ancient times – the Eucharistic assembly of the Church. In the central apse, where the Eucharist is celebrated on a stone Holy Table (altar) under a marble canopy (ciborium), the eastern wall depicts the Communion of the apostles – a traditional scene that is always placed in the center of the iconostasis in every Orthodox church. In the conch, above the canopy, there are the symbols of the four Gospels: a man (Matthew), a lion (Mark), a calf (Luke) and an eagle (John). These biblical animals surround the Hetoimasia ("Throne prepared") – an empty royal throne, symbolizing the expectation of the Second Coming of Christ. Along the eastern wall, under the fresco, there are seats for the priests, and in the center, in the High Place, there is an episcopal throne.

The altar area is separated from the main area of the church by a low stone barrier, which is purely functional – it clearly defines the space of the altar, prothesis and diaconicon. The liturgical functions for which they were built in ancient times were returned to the side apses: in the northern apse – prothesis with the Table of Oblation, in the southern – diaconicon. The functions of the side apses determined the content of the frescoes. The frescoes in the northern apse present the Old Testament prototypes of Christ's Calvary sacrifice and the Eucharist: "Binding of Isaac" and "Abraham's Meeting with Melchizedek", "Theophany at the Burning bush to Moses", "Moses Receiving the Tablets of the Covenant" and "Moses Striking Water from the Rock". On the walls of the diaconicon the events of the New Testament are depicted: deacons chosen for social service, according to the Book of the Acts of the Apostles, and Paul the Apostle shown twice: on the left as Saul of Tarsus guarding the clothes of the people who are stoning protomartyr deacon Stephen, on the right as the Apostle, the author of 14 epistles.

On the piers between the altar and the side apses, frescoes are also painted, framed by marble icon cases – the image of Jesus Christ on the right and the image of the Mother of God on the left. Both are shown full-length: Christ the Savior with the Book (Gospel) in his hand, the Mother of God in a prayerful pose with a scroll with words of a prayer in Greek. These two images underpinned the development of the deesis, from which, over the centuries, in Orthodox churches was developed iconostasis in its complex form.

Unusual features of the Lower church include a marble baptismal font of a cruciform shape, intended for baptism of adults by full immersion, and a black and white marble labyrinth in the center of the church floor, a symbol of the human path to God. The labyrinth was modeled after the Chartres Cathedral labyrinth in France.

The floor of the Lower church is lined with ceramic plinth that was used to cover the floor both in Europe and in Ancient Russia.

An essential part in the internal design of the Lower church play the icons placed on the walls and pillars, painted by Archimandrite Zinon and other icon painters. All of them were painted on donations from parishioners and other benefactors.

=== The Upper Church ===
The internal volume of the Upper church is complemented by the North and South aisles, and a spacious antechurch from the West. The Tsar's staircase leads to this antechurch. In the west wall of the antechurch there is a door to a covered passage which connects the Upper church with the Bell tower.

The second staircase on the southern side of the cathedral leads from the Lower church up to the choir balcony of the Upper church.

Today, as it was 100 years ago, there are three altars in the Upper church. The central altar is dedicated to the Feodorovskaya Icon of the Mother of God and Saint Michael Maleinos, the heavenly patron of the first Tsar of the Romanov dynasty, Michael Feodorovich.

The Southern side-altar was originally dedicated to Saint Nicholas the Wonderworker and to Saint martyr Alexandra of Rome, the heavenly patrons of the regal couple of Emperor Nicholas II and Empress Alexandra Feodorovna. Now it is dedicated to Royal Passion-Bearers.

The Northern side-altar was originally dedicated to the Holy Right-Believing Prince Mikhail of Tver and saint Metropolitan Alexius of Moscow, the heavenly patrons of, respectively, Grand Duke Michael Alexandrovich of Russia, the Tsar's brother and patron of the Construction Committee, and the heir to the throne Alexei Nikolaevich, Tsarevich of Russia. Now this side-altar is dedicated to the Holy New Martyrs and Confessors of the Russian Orthodox Church.

After attending the consecration of the Feodorovsky Cathedral on January 15, 1914, Emperor Nicholas II noted: "The Church produces an excellent impression: it is high, bright, beautiful".

The five-tiered iconostasis was originally carved from linden and gilded. The upper tiers were modeled after of the iconostasis of the Church of the Georgian Icon of the Mother of God (Russian: Грузинская икона Божией Матери) in Moscow (the parish church of the Romanov boyars), and the lower tiers – after the iconostases of the Yaroslavl churches. Icons were painted by famous Moscow iconographers I. M. Dikarev, V. P. Guryanov, G. I. Chirikov. Today the iconostasis has been recreated in accordance with the destroyed prototype. Icons, including copies of those preserved in the State Museum of the History of Religion, were painted by icon painters from the St. John the Theologian workshop in St. Petersburg.

In the center of the church on four chains hangs an openwork bronze chandelier with a diameter of 6.5 meters in the form of the "Crown of the Grand Attire" (Russian: Корона (Шапка) Большого Наряда, the royal crown of Mikhail Feodorovich), also recreated to replace the lost one.

Various items recreated according to the original design include: small lateral chandeliers, Golgotha, the Tsar's place (Russian: Царское место, the place of honor of the Tsar in an Orthodox church), precession lantern modeled after a lantern from Ipatievsky Monastery in Kostroma, and two floor lamps on the staircases.

The spacious choir area with adjacent bright rooms of the square Northwestern tower give additional volume to the Upper church.

=== Bell Tower ===
The bell tower of the Feodorovsky Cathedral, designed in the style of the Yaroslavl bell towers of the 17th century, is located opposite the western facade and is connected to the Upper church by a covered passage. It is octagonal in shape with wide openings for bells. A hipped tiled roof is topped with a golden cross.

The bell tower had eleven bells known as "Romanovsky ringing". The first, largest bell was called "Mikhail-Nikolai" in honor of Tsar Mikhail Fedorovich Romanov and Emperor Nicholas II and had a weight of 8.5 tons. The second bell "Alexandra" – in honor of Empress Alexandra Feodorovna; the third bell "Maria" – in honor of the widowed Empress Maria Feodorovna; the fourth bell "Aleksey" – in honor of Tsarevich Alexei; the fifth bell "Mikhail" – in honor of the Grand Duke Michael Alexandrovich, brother of the emperor, the august patron of the Construction Committee. The next four bells were named in honor of the royal daughters – the Grand Duchesses – "Olga", "Tatiana", "Maria" and "Anastasia". The bells were decorated with their relief portraits and icons of their heavenly patrons. On the top were the texts of prayers in Slavic script of the 17th century. The bells also bore images of the coats of arms of ancient Russian cities, of the Muscovite kingdom and the House of Romanov. The bells were cast at the bell factory in Yaroslavl. The total weight of the bells was about 17 tons.

The fate of the original bells of the Feodorovsky Cathedral is unknown. Most probably they were broken and melted down. During the restoration only a small fragment of a bell was found in the floor of the lower temple.

In the 21st century all the bells were recreated to match their originals.

=== Clergy house and the wall ===
The Clergy house was built in close proximity to the cathedral in 1915–1916 according to the project of architect Stepan Krichinsky. The only remaining photograph from 1938 shows a building in the style of Moscow houses of 17th century standing to the south of the cathedral. The House was destroyed in the 1960s, and the final decision to rebuild it was made by the board of trustees in 2010. The reconstruction was mostly finished in 2014, and although the historical name "Clergy house" was retained, now the House serves another purpose as an Educational center (Russian: Просветительский центр), where various religious and educational activities take place, all of them serving the purpose of evangelical preaching, for the sake of which the Feodorovsky Cathedral was revived.

A fragment of a red brick "Kremlin" wall adjacent to the Bell Tower of the cathedral is another part of the architectural ensemble, which the architect conceived at the beginning of the 20th century around the Feodorovsky cathedral. This wall was also supposed to be lined with white stone, but it remained in its "unfinished" form.

The plan to name the square in front of the cathedral after Alexander Nevsky and to erect a monument to him was never implemented.

== Literature ==
- Храм-памятник 300-летия царствования дома Романовых в С.-Петербурге // Правительственный вестник. — 1914. — No. 11 от 28 января 1915. — С. 5.
- Судьба храма — Судьба России: Храм Федоровской иконы Божией Матери / Авт.-сост.: протоиерей Александр Сорокин и Александр Зимин. — СПб.: Изд-во Зимина, 2006.
- Время разрушать и время строить: История храма Федоровской иконы Божией Матери в память 300-летия Дома Романовых в Санкт-Петербурге / Авт.-сост.: протоиерей Александр Сорокин и Александр Зимин. — СПб.: Изд-во Зимина, 2012 (Time to break down and time to build. History of the Fedorovskaya Icon of the Mother of God Cathedral in Commemoration of the Romanov Tercentenary in St. Petersburg).
- ΑΝΑΣΤΑΣΙΣ: Подлинная история украшения нижнего храма собора Феодоровской иконы Божией Матери, рассказанная участниками и очевидцами событий / Авт.-сост.: протоиерей Александр Сорокин и Александр Зимин. — СПб.: Изд-во Зимина, 2013.

== Links ==
External videos
- Une paroisse vivante — au sein de la cathédrale impériale Feodorovsky

- Church of the Fedorovskaya Icon of the Mother of God in Commemoration of the Romanov Tercentenary in St. Petersburg — official site (In Russian)
