= Kozhva (inhabited locality) =

Kozhva (Russian: Кожва) is the name of several urban localities in Russia.

== Modern localities ==
- Kozhva, an urban-type settlement under the administrative jurisdiction of the town of republic significance of Pechora in the Komi Republic; 65°7′N 57°3′E

== Alternative names ==
- Kozhva, alternative name of Izyayu, an urban-type settlement under the administrative jurisdiction of Kozhva Urban-Type Settlement Administrative Territory under the administrative jurisdiction of the town of republic significance of Pechora in the Komi Republic; 65°7′N 56°59′E
- Kozhva, alternative name of Ust-Kozhva, a village under the administrative jurisdiction of Kozhva Urban-Type Settlement Administrative Territory under the administrative jurisdiction of the town of republic significance of Pechora in the Komi Republic; 65°9′N 57°0′E
