= Ksenia Pokrovsky =

Russian painter

Ksenia Mikhailovna (Belyakova) Pokrovsky (Russian: Ксения Михайловна Покровская; March 9, 1942 – July 7, 2013) was a prominent Russian Orthodox icon painter instrumental in the revival of traditional icon painting. Pokrovsky began her vocation in 1969 and worked in the Moscow region until the collapse of the Soviet Union. In 1991 she immigrated to the United States where she worked until her death in 2013. During her lifetime Pokrovsky produced a distinctive and prodigious corpus of icons for churches and individuals. Her influence continues to resonate through the work of hundreds of students throughout the world who studied with her.

== Biography ==
Ksenia Mikhailovna Pokrovsky was born March 9, 1942, in Osh, Kyrgyzstan (Ferghana, Central Asia). During World War II many Muscovites were evacuated to various locations in Central Asia as the Nazi army advanced to within 100 miles of Moscow. Known by the code name Operation Barbarossa and launched in June 1941, the Nazi land invasion of the Soviet Union was the largest in the history of warfare. Pokrovsky's expectant mother Tatyana (Shpitalskaya) Belyakova was among those temporarily relocated to Osh. Pokrovsky died July 7, 2013, in Boston, Massachusetts, USA.

== Ancestry and early life ==
Pokrovsky’s ancestry includes Russian, Bulgarian, Jewish and Polish grandparents, as well as an 18th-century Tartar progenitor. Her maternal grandfather was Eugeniy I. Shpitalsky (1879-1931). A distinguished State University professor in the 1920s, he was the author of important research in the field of catalysis and physical-electrochemistry. Although a member of the USSR Academy of Sciences, he fell prey to Stalin’s purges and was arrested on false charges in 1929 (posthumously rehabilitated in 1956). Sentenced to many years of compulsory labor, his research was still considered vital to Soviet interests. He was confined to a prison specifically built on the site of his laboratory, where he died.

Pokrovsky was raised by an atheistic mother whom she described as a “romantic communist”, but she was deeply influenced by the Orthodox Christian faith of her grandmothers. Pokrovsky’s paternal great aunt, the artist Yekaterina Mikhaylovna Belyakova (1892-1980), was her model for creativity and also her mentor in the Orthodox Christian faith. Pokrovsky was baptized at the age of 24, after she was a legal adult under Soviet law. By postponing her baptism, she protected her parents against charges that might be brought against them for failing to shield their child from "obsolete religious views".

In the 1960s Pokrovsky was a promising biophysics student at Moscow State University, but her interest in science was always an inseparable part of her larger metaphysical quest. After reading an article on the discovery of the DNA spiral, her Bulgarian grandmother Nevenka remarked, “Look, Ksenia, these are the tablets of the covenant" (meaning the commandments given to Moses, written by God Himself). It was at Moscow State University that Ksenia met fellow student Lev Alexeyevich Pokrovsky. They married in 1960 and lived together for 53 years. Lev became a teaching professor and researcher of theoretical physics. It was while working on her Ph.D. dissertation that Pokrovsky realized that she did not want to devote her life to being a laboratory researcher. A career would leave little freedom for her deeper spiritual questions and her desire to raise a family. Any successful discoveries would contribute to the larger mission of the Soviet Union, the same political system that imprisoned her grandfather.

== Religious repression under Communism ==
Ksenia Pokrovsky began her career as an icon painter in 1969 – a time when icon painting was still banned in the Soviet Union, and when the few individuals who were secretly practicing the ancient art were under constant threat of persecution. Having no possibility of learning through systematic education or under the tutelage of a master, Pokrovsky was almost entirely self-taught. This was a difficult time for the Russian Church. From 1917 onward, Christians faced a peril for which there was no precedent in earlier Christian history. The Roman Empire, infamous for persecuting Christians, was in no sense an atheist state; but Soviet Communism was committed to full elimination of all religious belief. Many places of worship were closed, transformed into museums of atheism, or other-use facilities (bars, theaters, warehouses, garages); in very many cases, they were utterly destroyed. Those who dared to attend the services of the Church were under constant scrutiny by the authorities as being "enemies of the people" or otherwise "undesirables".

== Fr. Alexander Men and Mother Juliana ==
Pokrovsky’s need to find a priest with whom she could discuss her doubts about a scientific career led her to Father Alexander Men, often referred to as the "Apostle to the Intellectuals”. Men’s connections with the Catacomb Church, which refused to cooperate with the Soviet authorities, meant that he was constantly under suspicion. His understanding of world religions, charismatic personality and erudition attracted many converts, especially from intellectual and artistic circles, but also made him the target of KGB harassment. Men performed the marriage ceremony of Lev and Ksenia; he became a close friend and frequent visitor in their home. The Pokrovskys became a part of his parish in Novaya Derevnya, a short distance from Moscow.Men encouraged Ksenia's interest in iconography, giving her his blessing. "Study iconography," he told her, "because twenty years from now there will be a tremendous interest in this art. Many people will begin painting icons, and there will be a need for teachers. You will teach others,” he told her, demonstrating prophetic insight.

Through learning the technical aspects of iconography on her own, Pokrovsky was able to meet other like-minded students at museums, archaeological sites and churches, and through a network of connections in the underground church. During the 1970s, the Pokrovsky family rented a summer home (dacha) in Zagorsk, now Sergei Posad, which allowed Ksenia to spend many hours with her new neighbor, Mother Juliana (Maria Nikolayevna Sokolova). Officially, Maria Sokolova worked as an art restorer, and helped in the state-sponsored restoration of the Holy Trinity Lavra of St. Sergius. In private life, she was a consecrated nun. Mother Juliana was one of a handful of traditional icon painters who survived persecution. She is widely credited with preserving the living tradition of icon painting and with transmitting it to her successors during one of the most difficult periods in the history of the Russian Church. Ksenia’s proximity to Mother Juliana in these summer months was invaluable- they were spent discussing iconography, the meaning of its subject matter, as well as questions of technique, materials and style. These meetings gave Pokrovsky a great storehouse of knowledge.

== Ksenia Pokrovsky the teacher ==
The 1970s were particularly dangerous times for icon painters. With the dissident movement on the rise, writing new icons was considered a criminal activity, on par with selling illicit narcotics, firearms, pornography or the possession of banned literature and foreign currency. Even under the threat of prosecution, Ksenia Pokrovsky applied her scientific mind to understanding both the practical and theoretical attributes of icons. Organizing a network of geologists, she was able to obtain the natural mineral and clay pigments with which historical Russian icons were made. This also enabled her to avoid the state-run art-supply stores which required membership in the USSR Union of Artists. When asked how she dealt with Soviet life, she said candidly, “We ignored them,” in itself a honed skill. Restoration work and commissions for icons brought her a modest but necessary income. Often work was reciprocated with barter, supplying the family with food, medicine, goods and services unobtainable in public stores. Currency, receipts and invoices were avoided as “evidence of my crimes”. If a client had difficulty paying, she would accept a minimal token payment, or work for free. She never refused work; clients unable to pay reciprocated with prayers and lifelong loyal friendships.

Pokrovsky soon became a sought after restorer of icons and teacher to all who were interested in the subject. Recognizing the depth of her sincerity, talent and determination, she became friends with many museum curators and collectors who allowed her open access to their collections. With her growing reputation, the Soviet authorities did not ignore her. She was brought into the local police station for interrogation, and shown the prison cells where she would be sent if she did not admit to her work. She presented herself as a restless, bored housewife with five small children. She confessed that this ‘innocuous hobby’ was her only way of keeping her sanity; she was released and never confronted with the threat of arrest again. A decade later, days before the Pokrovsky family immigrated to the United States, a neighbor admitted that the secret police had installed listening devices in the Pokrovsky flat by wiring them through her apartment.

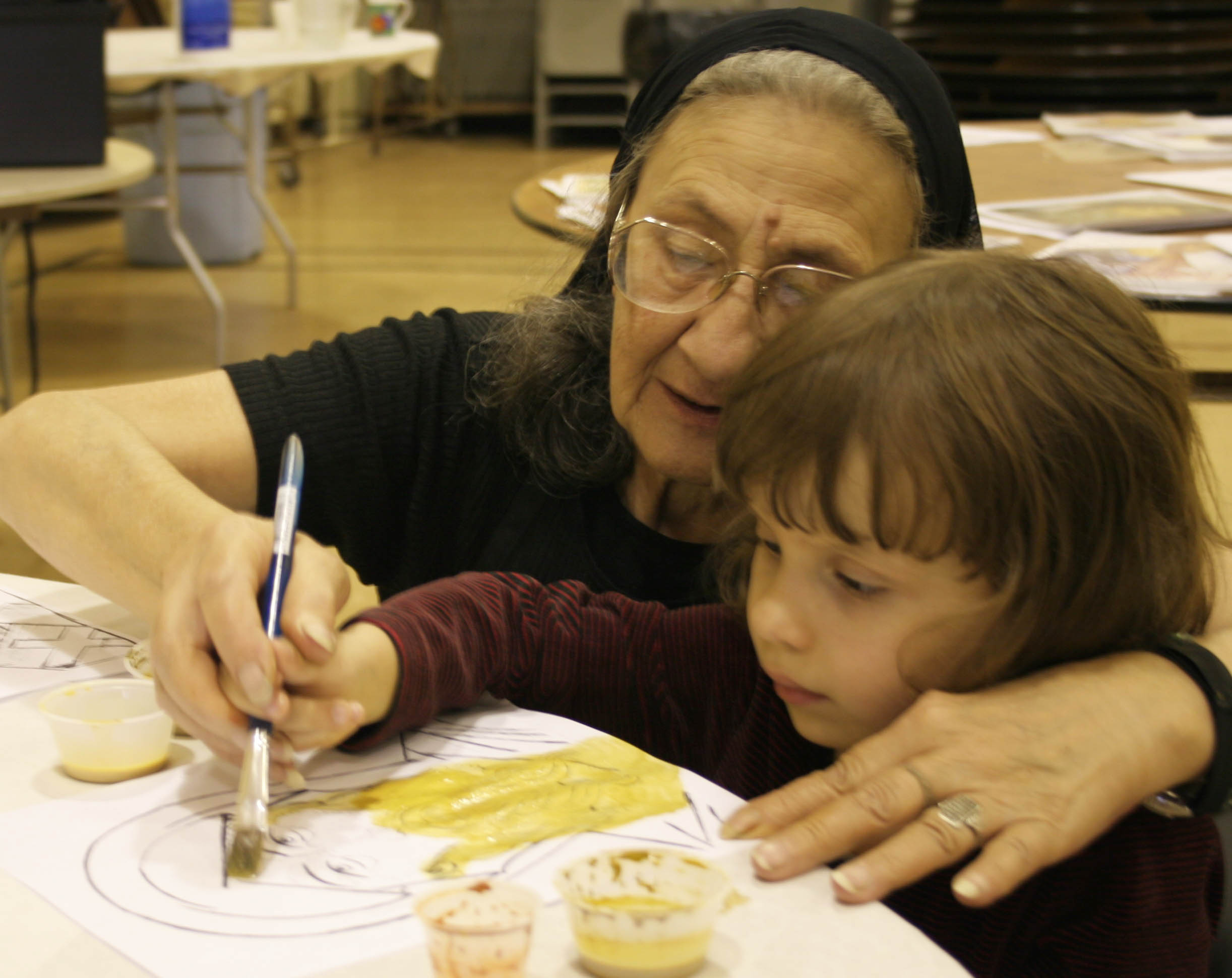
Ksenia Pokrovsky teaching at St. Tikhon Seminary, June 2008

Her pedagogical talents and scholarship cemented a network of like-minded individuals into a clandestine movement that brought about the revival of tradition iconography in Russia in the late 1980s. "I met Xenia Pokrovsky in the eighties," says art historian Irina Yazykova. "Already she had gathered many students around her. She was a great teacher who trained so many painters. She was a mother of many children, but her house was never closed. And no matter when you came, the house was always full of people." A circle of artists interested in becoming icon painters and iconologists formed around Pokrovsky. It was called the Izograph Society of Russian Iconographers. Members included Anatoliy Volgin, Alexander Sokolov, A. Lavdansky, A. Vronsky, Alexander Chashkin, Anton Yarzhombeck; the jeweler Mark Lozinsky and iconologist Irina Yazykova. Ksenia was a close friend of many other working icon painters and counted Archimandrite Zinon as one of her friends.

== Artistic influences and style ==
Pokrovsky herself painted brightly and expressively. In stylistic terms, she was oriented to classical Russian iconography of the 15–17th centuries. The foundation of her work were 15th century Novgorod icons. She absorbed their strong semantic language and limited, albeit, versatile palette. Their simplicity and directness, even in miniature work, was to become a hallmark of her work. She admired the asceticism of icons and was discriminating in her use of ornament. She was attracted to the expressive work of Theophanes the Greek, the classical harmony of Rublev, and the versatility of Dionysius. Although thoroughly Russian, she was also enthusiastic of Greek, Serbian, Bulgarian, Georgian and Coptic icons, as well as the work of the Byzantine era. As she later taught her students, the most authentic canons of iconography are found in the best icons themselves. Working from historical prototypes is an essential process if one is to truly understand historical iconography. Mother Juliana, who witnessed the destruction of thousands of icons told her “It is selfish to make new icons.“

But both Mother Juliana and Ksenia understood that there would always be a need for icons of recently recognized saints or events in the ongoing history of the Church, such as the New Martyrs. Before using iconography as a flexible, expressive language, one needed to be fluent in its grammar, vocabulary and styles. There should be no rupture between the past and the present- theologically, semantically or aesthetically. In a nation suffering from its own iconoclasm, the first task was to restore the stability of the tradition. After decades of restoring and copying, she was one of the first painters to design new prototypes for icons of the martyred Romanov Family, and made a large icon on Millennium of Baptism of Russia (1988), commissioned by Metropolitan Philaret of Belarus, now in Minsk. In February 1998 her original composition of St. Tikhon Patriarch of Moscow was installed in the newly reconstructed Church of Christ the Savior in Moscow. The central figure of St. Tikhon is surrounded by 18 smaller icons in the border, depicting events of the saint's life, his difficult ministry under the Bolshevik reign, and the miraculous events surrounding his death. As Pokrovsky's reputation spread, she was invited to create icons for churches in Estonia and, with a team, worked in a newly built Orthodox church in Hajnowka and other churches in Eastern Poland.

== Immigration and work in America ==
The 1988 celebrations commemorating the millennium of Christianity in Russia ushered in a greater amount of religious freedom. The subsequent instability of Perestroika offered no reassurances of a future better than previous Soviet life. The murder of their close friend and spiritual father Alexander Men solidified the Pokrovsky family's decision to immigrate to the United States in June 1991. Her icon of the Archangel Michael on horseback (an icon representing the beginning of the Apocalypse) showed contemporary Soviet architecture collapsing into an abyss.

Pokrovsky was not sure that there would be any need for her iconography in a predominantly Protestant country. She brought her paints, brushes, and boards almost as an afterthought. But her icons did get noticed, and she began receiving commissions for her work, as well as teaching new students. Just as in Moscow, Ksenia Pokrovsky was soon surrounded by a new circle of icon painters attracted by her knowledge and her talent for pedagogy.

While remaining true to the canon, Ksenia strove to make her icons accessible and interesting to the modern viewer. She understood iconography as a tradition that looked forward as well as backwards. She used English lettering, and some of her icons included scenes from American history. Serving the needs of her new home, Pokrovsky frequently painted icons of American saints. One of her most important American commissions was of the newly canonized St. Alexis Toth (1853-1909), bishop of Wilkes-Barre. This full-length icon for the shrine of his relics is now in the Monastery Church of St. Tikhon of Zadonsk, South Canaan, PA.

One of her most celebrated and widely reproduced icons is the "Synaxis Of All Saints Who Have Shone Forth In North America". Archived from the original on 2012-02-03., which she wrote in 1995. Now located in the Syosset NY offices of the Orthodox Church in America, the icon represents the entire history of Orthodoxy in North America. The central panel depicts SS. Juvenaly, Alexander, Alexis Toth, Herman of Alaska, Peter the Aleut, Jacob, Tikhon, Innocent of Alaska, and Raphael of Brooklyn. The wide surrounding border, or “kleymos” shows events from the life of each saint; for most of these saints and events, it is their first portrayal in iconography.

Ksenia also wrote icons of western, Roman Catholic saints. Sometimes she created iconography that was wholly new; at other times she made variations on traditional subjects, adding new scenes to them, as often was done in her folding icons – all demonstrating that the icon is fully capable of adapting to new cultural conditions. One of her most ambitious compositions was a commission for the Roman Catholic Cathedral of St. Peter in Trier, Germany. This remarkable work shows the assembly of all saints, eastern and western, connected with the cathedral's history. Irina Yazykova, author of "The Hidden and Triumphant: the Underground Struggle to Save Russian Iconography", has said that "Ksenia Pokrovsky represented our most convincing contemporary witness to the icon's ability to unify Christians of different backgrounds."

Seeking to raise the general level of iconography in the United States, she taught week-long iconography workshops throughout the United States. Working with the Orthodox non-profit organization Hexaemeron, her first "Six Days of Creation Iconography workshop" was held in Lexington KY in 2003. She attracted students internationally, and her last workshop in 2013 was in São Paulo, Brazil.

Pokrovsky's icons can be found in the Church of The Holy Trinity in Boston, Christ the Saviour Orthodox Christian Church, Paramus, NJ, Christ the Saviour Orthodox Church, Harrisburg, PA, in St. Vladimir Orthodox Seminary in Yonkers, NY. Assisted by her daughter Anna Gouriev, also an icon painter, the last decade of Ksenia's life was busy with large scale commissions for the entire interiors of churches, among which are St. Andrew's Orthodox Church in Lexington, KY, and St. Mary Magdalen Church in New York City. As in her miniature work, there is a harmony to the complexity of the many scenes. Each figure is fully realized, each scene is complete, and altogether, they contribute to an overall sense of festive joy.

=== Death ===
Ksenia Pokrovsky died July 7, 2013, following a short illness. Her death coincided with the 2013 celebration of the "Synaxis of All Saints who have Shone Forth in North America", the subject of her most celebrated icon. Her Funeral service was held at St. Nicholas Orthodox Church, Salem, Massachusetts, followed by an all-night vigil kept by family and friends. Burial was the following day at St. Tikhon of Zadonsk Monastery, South Canaan, Pennsylvania.
