= Pechora Airport =

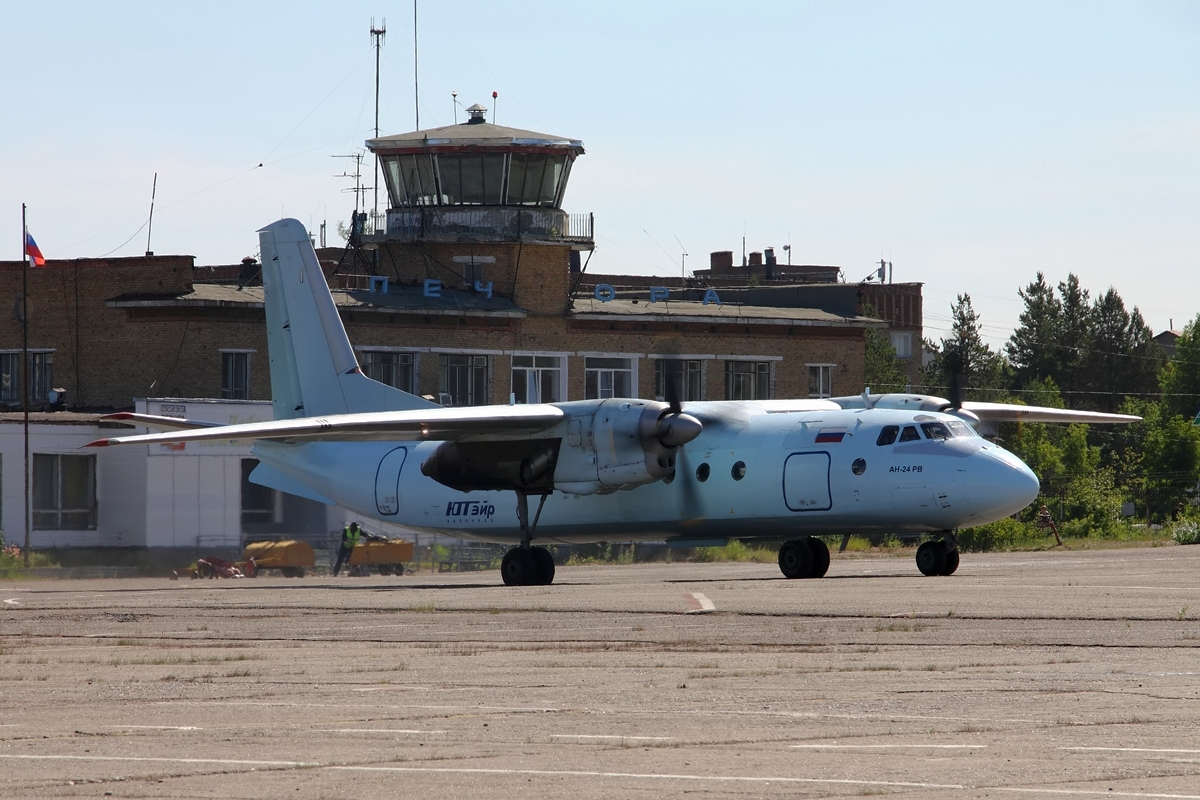
- Antonov An-24 in July 2013
- IATA: PEX; ICAO: UUYP

Summary
- Airport type: Public
- Location: Pechora
- Elevation AMSL: 197 ft (60 m)
- Coordinates: 65°7′18″N 57°7′48″E
- Interactive map of Pechora Airport

Runways
Direction	Length		Surface
Direction	ft	m	Surface
16/34	5,905	1,800	Asphalt

Pechora Airport (Komi: Печӧра Аэропорт, Russian: Аэропорт Печора) (IATA: PEX, ICAO: UUYP) is an airport in Komi, Russia, located 5 km southwest of Pechora. It accommodates small transports. It should not be confused with the larger Pechora Kamenka air base. The elevation of Pechora Airport is 197 ft (60 m). Despite being on the smaller side, Pechora Airport serves as a way to connect the remote region with the rest of the world.

== Airlines and destinations ==
Airlines	Destinations
Komiaviatrans	Syktyvkar

== See also ==
- List of airports in Russia
