= Zinon (Teodor) =

Russian clergyman, painter, and teacher

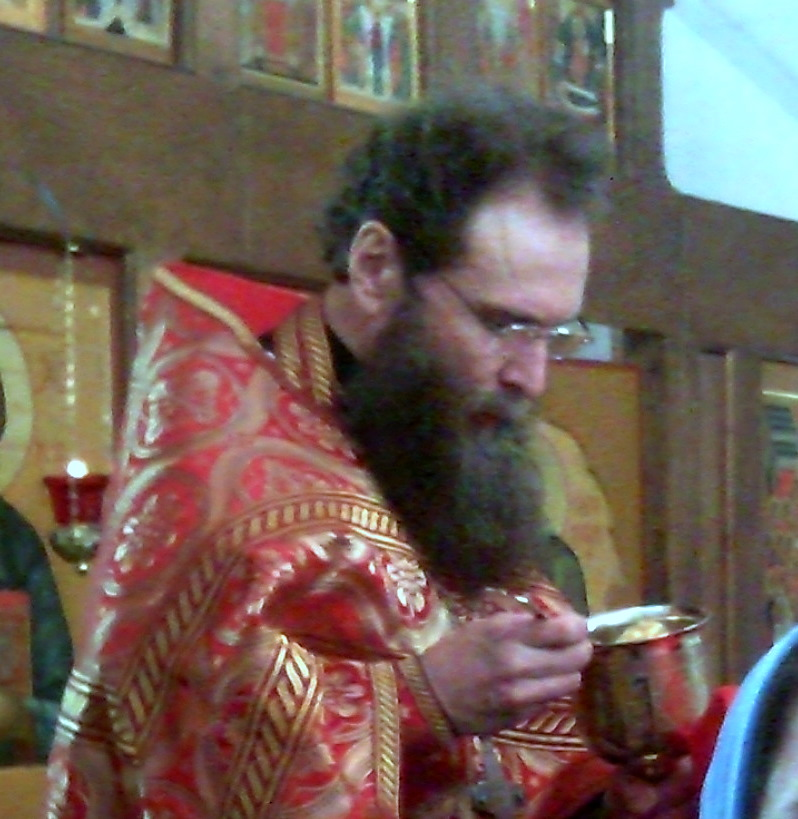
Image of Zinon

Archimandrite Zinon (Vladimir Mikhailovich Teodor; October 12, 1953, Pervomaisk, Nikolaev region, Ukrainian SSR) is a clergyman of the Russian Orthodox Church, a prominent icon painter, theorist of church art, and teacher. Laureate of the State Prize of Russia (1994).

== Biography ==
Vladimir Teodor graduated from Pervomaisk Secondary School No. 4 in 1969, and after that, at the age of 15, he entered Grekov Odesa Art School, the painting department. According to his own recollections, "somewhere from the 2nd year I realized that I would not become a Soviet artist, because I was completely disgusted with it; in general, the whole Soviet reality caused me the strongest rejection – in everything". He started copying old icons, either from originals or, more often, from reproductions. In Odesa there were no teachers of icon painting who could teach icon techniques, canons, artistic techniques and other secrets of the icon painting craft.

In 1973 Vladimir Teodor graduated from the Odesa Art School and joined the army. He served in the military in Odesa, working in his specialty. After being demobilized in 1975, he performed artistic work in the Assumption Cathedral of Odesa.

On September 5, 1976, at the age of 23, he entered the Pskov-Caves Monastery as a novice, where on September 30 of the same year he was tonsured a monk with the name Zinon by the abbot of the monastery, Archimandrite Gabriel (Steblyuchenko). Three days later he was ordained to the rank of hierodeacon, and on November 8 of the same year – to the rank of hieromonk.

In 1978, with the blessing of Patriarch Pimen I of Moscow, hieromonk Zinon was accepted into the Trinity Lavra of St. Sergius brethren, where he painted the iconostasis of the chapel in the crypt of the Assumption Cathedral, painted the zakomaras, made the gate image of the Venerable Sergius and Nikon of Radonezh, and created many individual icons. During this period, he met the head of the restoration and icon painting workshop of the Trinity Lavra nun Iuliania (Sokolova).

Despite hieromonk Zinon's request to return him to the brotherhood of the Pskov-Caves Monastery, in 1983, due to the demand for an icon painter in the capital, he was transferred to the Danilov Monastery. There he created the iconostasis of the lower aisles of the church of St. The Fathers of the Seven Ecumenical Councils (jointly with priest Vyacheslav Savinykh), and prepared a project for painting the Trinity Cathedral, oriented towards the Byzantine era (not implemented).

In 1985 hieromonk Zinon painted the Martir Paraskeva church in the village Velikodvorye in the Vladimir Oblast. In the same year he returned to the Pskov-Caves Monastery, where he created the iconostases of the churches of the Holy Martyr Cornelius of Pskov (1985), Intercession of the Most Holy Virgin Mary over the Assumption Cathedral (1990) and the Pskov-Caves saints on Gorka (1989–1991).

In 1987 he completed the iconostasis c. St. Euphrosyne of Polotsk in Karsava (Latvia), and in 1988 he created the iconostasis of the chapel of St. Seraphim of Sarov in the Trinity Cathedral in Pskov (in 2008 it was "re-painted" and archimandrite Zinon's wark was destroyed). In 1989 hieromonk Zinon was elevated to the rank of archimandrite.

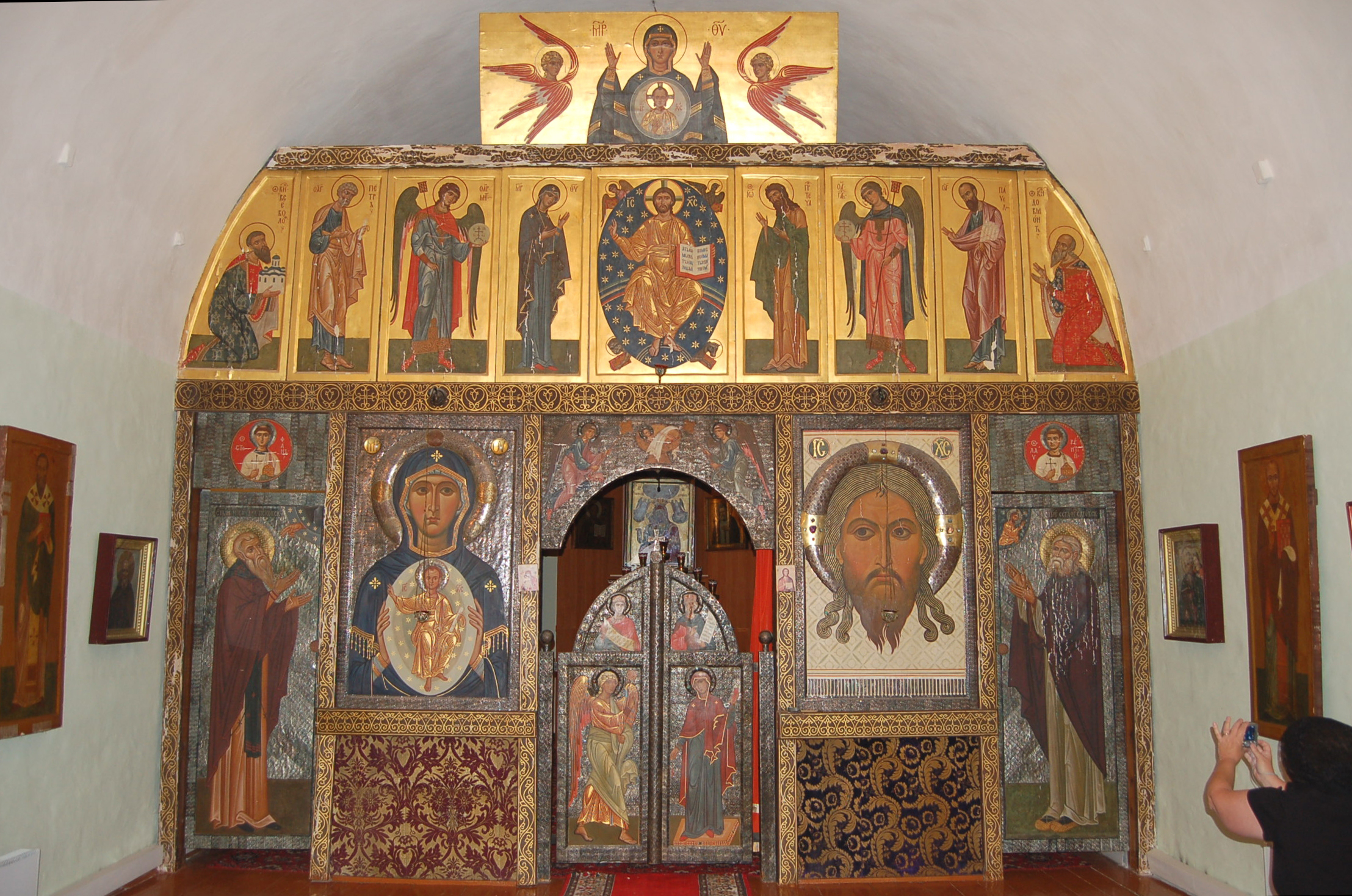
Iconostasis by Father Zenon in the basement chapel of Pskov Cathedral, 2006

In 1992, he painted the fraternal refectory of the New Valamo Monastery (Finland); in 1995, by order of the Orthodox Intercession Monastery in Bussy-en-Othe (Monastère orthodoxe de Bussy-en-Othe, France), he painted a large icon of the Yaroslavl Oranta (Orante d'Iaroslavl); performed fresco painting in the Church of the Holy Cross Monastery (Chevetogne Abbey, Belgium) (in the altar apse "Christ in Majesty Surrounded by the Evangelists" (1995), on the eastern wall of the narthex "New Jerusalem" (2000)). The master's experience was in demand in icon painting schools, where he was repeatedly invited to teach (the school of St. John of Damascus in Saint-Jean-en-Royans (France); schools in Venice and Seriate, near Bergamo (Italy), etc.). Perceiving his work in the light of Orthodox mission in Europe, archimandrite Zinon carried out orders for believers of different Christian denominations wishing to pray before the Orthodox Church images.

In 1994 archimandrite Zinon was transferred from Pskov-Caves Monastery to the Mirozhsky Monastery in Pskov. There he organized the International Icon Painting School, where he conducted courses for students from Russia, France, Italy and other countries. At that time the Saint Stephen gatehouse church was restored, for which archimandrite Zinon created a stone iconostasis with fresco icons (1996). With the blessing of Patriarch Alexy II of Moscow, for the 600th anniversary of the Transfer to Moscow (August 26, 1395) of the Virgin of Vladimir, icon, a copy of it was painted (1995, now in Optina Monastery). In 1995 archimandrite Zinon was awarded the State Prize of the Russian Federation "For contribution to the revival of the icon-painting tradition in Russia" (the monetary part of the prize was transferred to the St. Philaret's Institute in Moscow).

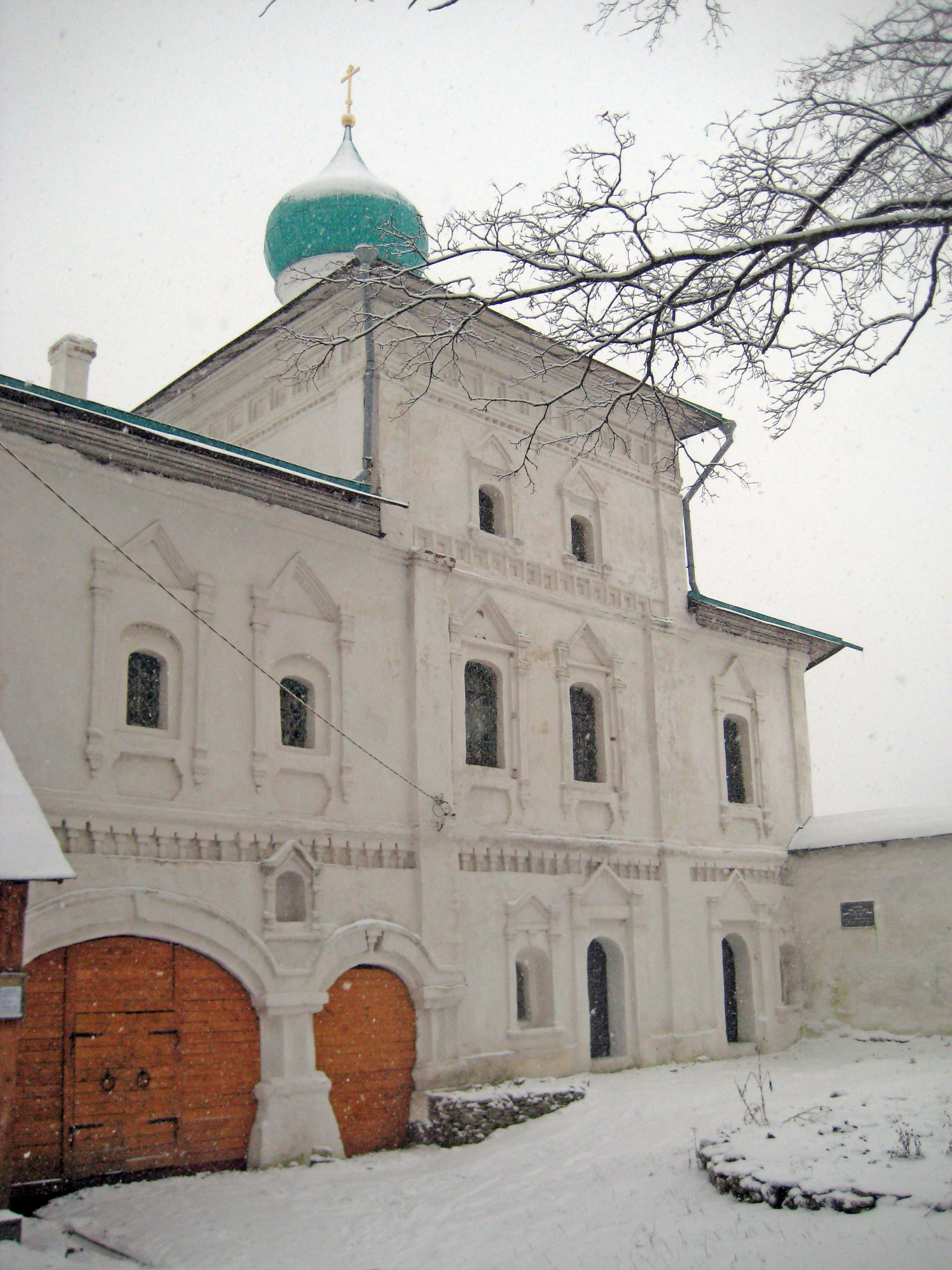
Saint Stephen gatehouse church in Mirozhsky Monasteryh

On November 28, 1996, by decree of the archbishop Evsevij (Savvin) of Pskov and Velikiye Luki, archimandrite Zinon was suspended from exercising all clerical functions for receiving communion in a Catholic Mass in the unconsecrated church of the Mirozh Monastery. By decree of Patriarch Alexy II on December 21, 2001 the suspension was lifted.

After being suspended from serving, archimandrite Zinon and the monastic community retired to the monastery he founded in the village Gverston (Малая Гверстонь, Pechora District, Pskov Oblast). During this period, at the orders of the clergy and laity, he painted many icons and created several iconostases for churches and monasteries. In 2000–2002 a temple was built in the monastery after archimandrite Zinon's design, for which encaustic (in the interior) and mosaic (on the facade) icons were made, as well as the royal doors using the technique of gold marking ("золотая наводка") on copper.

During 2004–2005, archimandrite Zinon worked on the construction and painting of the fresco altar barrier for the church of St. Sergius of Radonezh in the village Semkhoz (within the city of Sergiyev Posad), founded on the site of the death of priest Alexander Men. From 2006 to 2008, at the invitation of Bishop of Vienna and Austria Hilarion (Alfeev) in St. Nicholas Cathedral in Vienna (Никольский собор (Вена)), together with graduates of the Faculty of Church Arts of Saint Tikhon's Orthodox University, artists of the icon painting school of St. Nicholas the Wonderworker Church in Klenniki (Храм Николая Чудотворца в Клённиках, Moscow) and icon painters from Poland archimandrite Zinon completed the wall painting; he also painted icons for the iconostasis of the lower chapel of the cathedral.

In 2008, archimandrite Zinon worked in the Greek monastery of Simonopetra on Mount Athos, where he painted the temple.

== Style ==
Archimandrite Zinon's early works (1970 – early 1980s) were made in the traditions of ancient Russian icon painting of the 15th – early 16th century. In the works of this period the influence of the icon painter, nunJuliania (Sokolova) is noticeable.

In the mid-1980s, after studying Pskov icon painting of the 14th–15th centuries, archimandrite Zinon began to use in his works the images of pre-Mongol Russian painting and Byzantine traditions.

Since the mid-1990s, he turned to the early Christian art of Rome, Sinai, and Ravenna.

In addition to tempera painting, Zinon works in mosaic and encaustic techniques. He is also engaged in the design of temples, sketches of utensils and vestments, and design of books.

== Works ==
- Danilov Monastery: iconostasis in the traditions of the 15th–16th centuries for the Church of the Fathers of the Seven Ecumenical Councils (lower Intercession chapel).
- Church of St. Paraskeva Pyatnitsa in the Vladimir region.
- Pskov-Pechersky Monastery: the iconostases of the churches of the Venerable Martyr Cornelius (1985), the Intercession over the Assumption Cathedral (1990) and the Pechersk Saints on the Hill (1989–1991).
- St. Serafim of Sarov lower church iconostasis of the Trinity Cathedral of Pskov (destroyed).
- Participated in painting the refectory of the New Valamo Monastery in Finland
- Latin church at Chevetogne Abbey in Belgium.
- Church of St. Stephen in the Mirozhsky Monastery
- St. Sergius of Radonezh church at the Semkhoz station near Moscow, erected in memory of Alexander Men.
- St. Nicholas Cathedral in Vienna, Austria.
- Simonopetra monastery on Mount Athos.
- Lower temple of the Feodorovskaya Icon Cathedral in St. Petersburg.
- Church of the Transfiguration of the Lord and icon painting school in Seriate, Italy.
- Westminster Abbey: icon for the shrine of Edward the Confessor (2019).

== Literature ==
- Икона в литургическом возрождении // Памятники Отечества. 1992. No. 2/3(26/27): Быль монастырская. С. 57–63.
- Альбом «Современная православная икона». М., 1993. ISBN 5-88149-256-0
- Об иконе // Русская провинция. Новгород, 1993. No. 1. С. 71–74.
- À propos de l’Icône et de l'Église. La Prade, 1994.
- Икона рождается из Литургии // Христианос. Рига, 1995. Вып. 5. С. 140–160.
- Зинон, архимандрит. Зинон, архимандрит. «Беседы иконописца» Издания: «Фонд им. А. Меня», 1997; Рига, 1997; 3-е изд.: Псков, 2003, с предисловием С. С. Аверинцева ISBN 5-94542-048-4.
- ANAΣTAΣIΣ. Подлинная история украшения нижнего храма собора Феодоровской иконы Божией Матери, рассказанная участниками и очевидцами событий / Авт.-сост.: протоиерей Александр Сорокин и Александр Зимин. — СПб.: Изд-во Зимина, 2013.
