= Puteyets =

Puteyets Путеец
- Urban-type settlement
- Interactive map of Puteyets
- Location of Puteyets Puteyets (Komi Republic)
- Coordinates: 65°10′N 57°05′E
- Country: Russia
- Federal subject: Komi Republic
- Urban-type settlement administrative territorySelsoviet: Puteyets Urban-Type Settlement Administrative Territory
- Urban-type settlement status since: 1975

Population (2010 Census)
  - Total: 1,116
  - Estimate (2025): 724 (−35.1%)

Administrative status
  - Subordinated to: town of republic significance of Pechora
  - Capital of: Puteyets Urban-Type Settlement Administrative Territory

Municipal status
  - Municipal district: Pechora Municipal District
  - Urban settlement: Puteyets Urban Settlement
  - Capital of: Puteyets Urban Settlement
- Time zone: UTC+3 (MSK)
- Postal code: 169635
- OKTMO ID: 87620104051

Puteyets population
- 2010 Census: 1,116
- 2002 Census: 1,286
- 1989 Census: 1,485
- 1979 Census: 1,898

Puteyets (Russian: Путе́ец) is an urban locality (an urban-type settlement) under the administrative jurisdiction of the town of republic significance of Pechora in the Komi Republic, Russia. As of the 2010 Census, its population was 1,116.

== History ==
Urban-type settlement status was granted to Puteyets in 1975.

== Administrative and municipal status ==
Within the framework of administrative divisions, the urban-type settlement of Puteyets, together with five rural localities, is incorporated as Puteyets Urban-Type Settlement Administrative Territory, which is subordinated to the town of republic significance of Pechora. As a municipal division, Puteyets Urban-Type Settlement Administrative Territory is incorporated within Pechora Municipal District as Puteyets Urban Settlement.
