= Alexander Nevsky Brotherhood =

20th century Russian Orthodox Christian association

The Alexander Nevsky Brotherhood was an informal public association of clergy and laity of the Russian Orthodox Church, established in 1919 at the Holy Trinity Alexander Nevsky Lavra to counter anti-religious persecution by the Soviet authorities.

Between the autumn of 1917 and the winter of 1919, there were three attempts to organize associations of Orthodox believers in Petrograd, but they did not succeed. Among the first members of the Alexander Nevsky Brotherhood were the people who attempted to establish those three associations.

The Alexander Nevsky Brotherhood was established February 1, 1919, when a youth circle was created at the Alexander Nevsky Lavra, which included monks and laymen.

An important objective of the brotherhood was the creation of semi-legal monastic communities outside formal church structures ("v miru", "in the outside world"), as well as the monastic tonsure of young people (including secret ones) in order to preserve the institution of monasticism in the conditions of mass closure of monasteries. The fathers of the Brotherhood have always considered it as one of their major tasks to prepare young, educated clergy, which, under conditions of restriction and then complete elimination of religious education, would make it possible to preserve clergy capable of carrying out the revival of the Church in the future.

As part of the mass arrests of clergy and, above all, monastics, the JSPD (OGPU) authorities fabricated a massive case against members of the Brotherhood (over one hundred people were persecuted). On March 22, 1932, the OGPU Collegium handed down sentences to the defendants — from deprivation of the right to reside in Leningrad and the Leningrad region for three years to ten years in correctional labor camps. As a result of political repression by the OGPU in 1932, the activities of the Alexander Nevsky Brotherhood were discontinued.

All the leaders of the brotherhood, except for the future Metropolitan of Leningrad Gury (Egorov), died in 1936–1938, and the first generation of young monks who took monastic vows before 1932 was almost completely destroyed.

Most of the survivors were teenages at that time. Among them were four future prominent bishops — Metropolitans Ioann (Wendland), Leonid (Polyakov), Archbishops Nikon (Fomichev), Mikhei (Kharkharov).

In 2003, by the decision of the Holy Synod of the Russian Orthodox Church, three active members of the Brotherhood were glorified as saints: the hieromartyr Archimandrite Lev (Egorov), the martyrs Princess Kira Obolenskaya and Ekaterina Arskaya.

On November 18, 2008, Metropolitan of St. Petersburg and Ladoga Vladimir blessed the re-establishment of the Alexander Nevsky Brotherhood. It was recreated as an interregional public organization for the revival of religion, culture and patriotism.

== Literature ==
- Шкаровский М. В. Александро-Невское братство 1918-1932 годы. — СПб.: Православный летописец Санкт-Петербурга, 2003. — 272 с. — (Новомученикам Российским посвящается). — 1000 экз.
- Зегжда С. А. Александро-Невское братство: добрым примером, житием и словом (документальный очерк). — Набережные Челны: Новости мира, 2009. — 487 с.
- Шкаровский М. В. Подвиг мученичества и исповедничества Александро-Невского братства (по архивным документам 1930-х годов) // Свет Христов просвещает всех: Альманах Свято-Филаретовского института. — 2018. — No. 25. — C. 43–75.
- Шкаровский М. В. Сто лет Александро-Невского братства: история и современность. — СПб.: Издательство Александро-Невской лавры, 2018. — 352 с.
- Дашевская З. М., Феденко М. И. Особенности совершения богослужений в практике Александро-Невского братства // Альманах Свято-Филаретовского института. — 2018. — Вып. 25. — С. 76–90.
- Шкаровский М. В. Столетие Александро-Невского братства // Духовные доминанты Невского края на службе российской государственности. Сборник статей по материалам научно-практических и историко-краеведческих конференций и семинаров, прошедших в период с 2015 по 2018 годы. — СПб., 2019. — C. 86–103.
- Шкаровский М. В. Нелегальная деятельность Александро-Невского братства в 1925—1932 гг // Христианское чтение. — 2020. — No. 2. — С. 187–207.
- Александро-Невское братство: жизнь возрождённого братства (2008—2021 гг.) / под общ. ред. Н. В. Иевлева. — СПб.: Инкери, 2021. — 336 с. — ISBN 978-5-604-53535-6.
