= Stepan Krichinsky =

Russian architect (1874–1923)

Stepan Samoilovich Krichinsky
- Степа́н Само́йлович Кричи́нский
- Born: January 20, 1874; Kaskevichi estate, Oshmyansky Uyezd, Vilna Governorate, Russian Empire
- Died: August 9, 1923 (aged 49); Petrograd, Russian SFSR
- Citizenship: Russian Empire
- Style: Eclectics

Stepan Samoilovich Krichinsky (January 20, 1874 — August 9, 1923) was a Russian architect of the eclectic and modern era.

== Biography ==
Krichinsky was born and raised in the family of Major General Selim (Samoil) Krichinsky, a representative of Polish-Lithuanian Tatars. Krichinsky received secondary education at a real school in Vilnius. In 1897, he graduated from the Institute of Civil Engineers of Emperor Nicholas I. Since 1900, he worked as the chief architect in the Russian Border Guard Department.

Krichinsky got acquainted with the architecture of Italy, Germany, France, Sweden and Finland. He studied monuments of Russian architecture in the north and central Russian provinces. He investigated the issues of resort construction on the Kuban and the Black Sea coast in 1916–1917. Krichinsky built 24 buildings in various cities. He took part in the construction of some large buildings in Saint Petersburg.

From 1918 to 1920 he was a professor of architecture at the Kuban Polytechnic Institute, and from 1921 at the Institute of Civil Engineers in Petrograd. Since 1922 he was the head of the Architectural and Construction Department in Petrograd.

He was married to the daughter of Gleb Uspensky — Maria Glebovna. Her brother, Alexander Uspensky, was also a prominent architect. Stepan and Maria Krichinsky had three children: two sons, Gleb (born 1904) and Boris (born 1905), and a daughter Irina. In 1925—1926 Boris Krichinsky compiled a list of his father's works.

Stepan Krichinsky died in 1923 and was buried in Volkovo Cemetery in Saint Petersburg.

== List of works ==
- The building of the equestrian yard on the estate of A. E. Vorontsova-Dashkova (St. Petersburg, Shuvalovsky Park), 1906
- The building of the Institute of Experimental Veterinary Medicine, 1908
- The main building of the Brigade of the Separate Border Guard Corps, with the house church in the name of St. Nicholas the Wonderworker (St. Petersburg, Krasnogo Kursanta Street, 34), 1913—1914
- The building of the retail store for the officers of the garrison guard (St. Petersburg, Bolshaya Konyushennaya Street, 21/23), 1908—1910s, participation under the general overseeing of E. F. Virrikh
- Saint Petersburg Mosque (St. Petersburg, Kronverksky Prospekt, 7), 1910, designed by N.V. Vasilyev with the participation of Alexander von Hohen
- Complex of the Feodorovskaya Icon Cathedral in Commemoration of the Romanov Tercentenary (St. Petersburg, Poltavskaya Street), 1911—1914
- Mansion of the artist P. E. Shcherbov (Gatchina, Chekhov Street, 4a), 1910—1911
- Palace of E. A. Vorontsova-Dashkova (St. Petersburg, Shuvalovsky Park), 1912—1915
- The House of the Emir of Bukhara (St. Petersburg, Kamennoostrovsky Prospekt, 44-b), 1913
- "Feodorovsky gorodok" in Tsarskoye Selo (Pushkin, Academic Prospect, 14‑30), 1913—1917, in collaboration with V. A. Pokrovsky
- People's House and Theater of the Nevsky Society for the Organization of People's Sobriety (St. Petersburg, Shlisselburgsky Tract)
- St. Nicholas of Bari Church of the Imperial Orthodox Palestine Society (St. Petersburg, intersection of Kalashnikovsky Prospect (now Bakunin Prospect) and Mytninskaya Street), 1913—1915, demolished in 1932
- The building of the Imperial Orthodox Palestine Society (St. Petersburg, Mytninskaya Street, 10/47-49), 1916
- A number of buildings complementing the complex of the City children's hospital (since the 1920s — the Institute of Maternity and Infancy, now the Saint Petersburg State Pediatric Medical University (corner of Bolshoy Sampsonievsky Prospekt and Litovskaya Street), 1916
- Restoration and reconstruction of the buildings of the German embassy, the Buddhist temple, the building of the former Swedish embassy, 1922
- Apartment building (St. Petersburg, Barmaleeva Street, 26), 1912
- Suite building and other buildings of the Olgino estate (Ramon), 1906
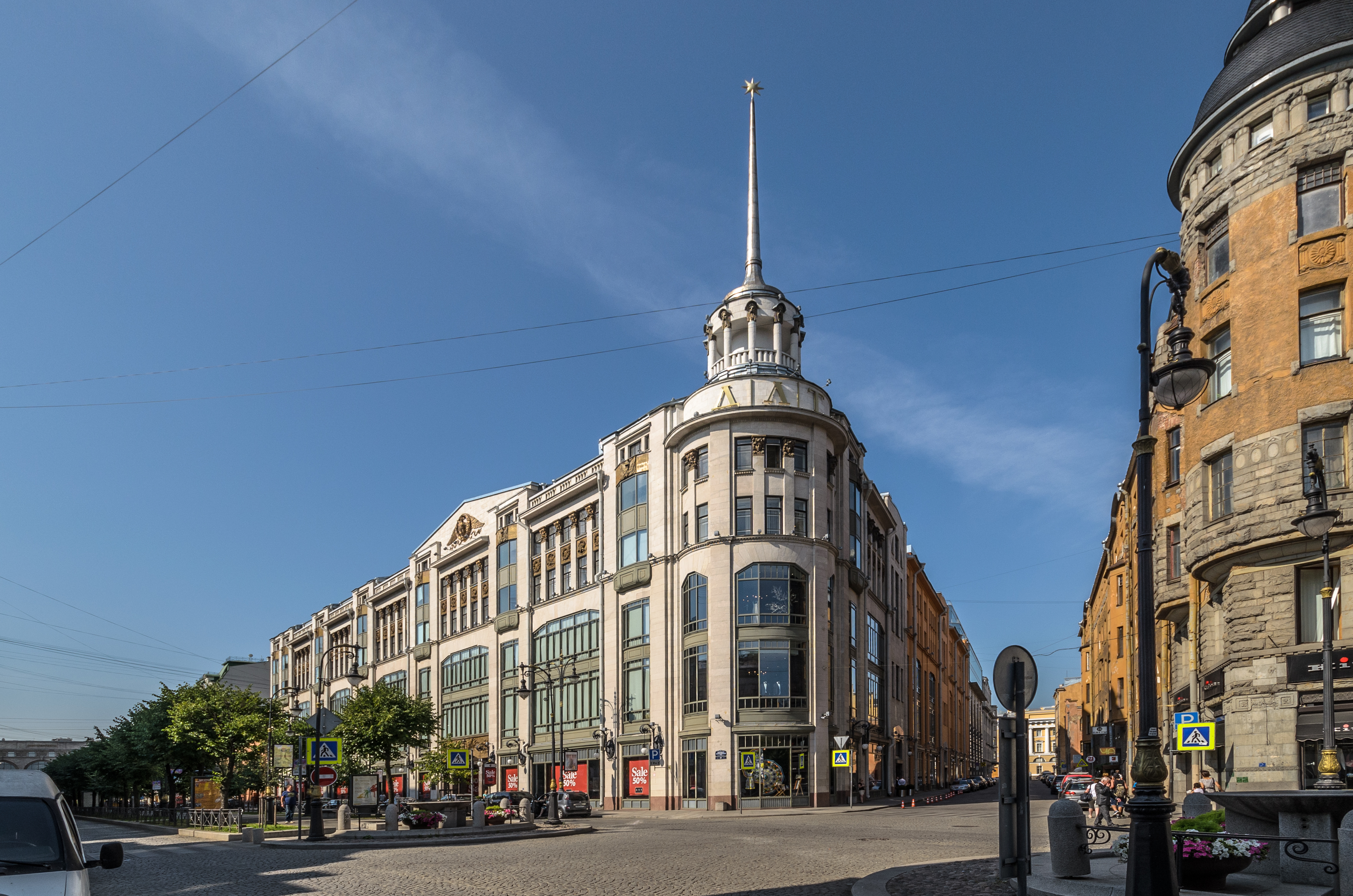
The retail store for the officers of the garrison guard, Bolshaya Konyushennaya street 21/23, St. Petersburg

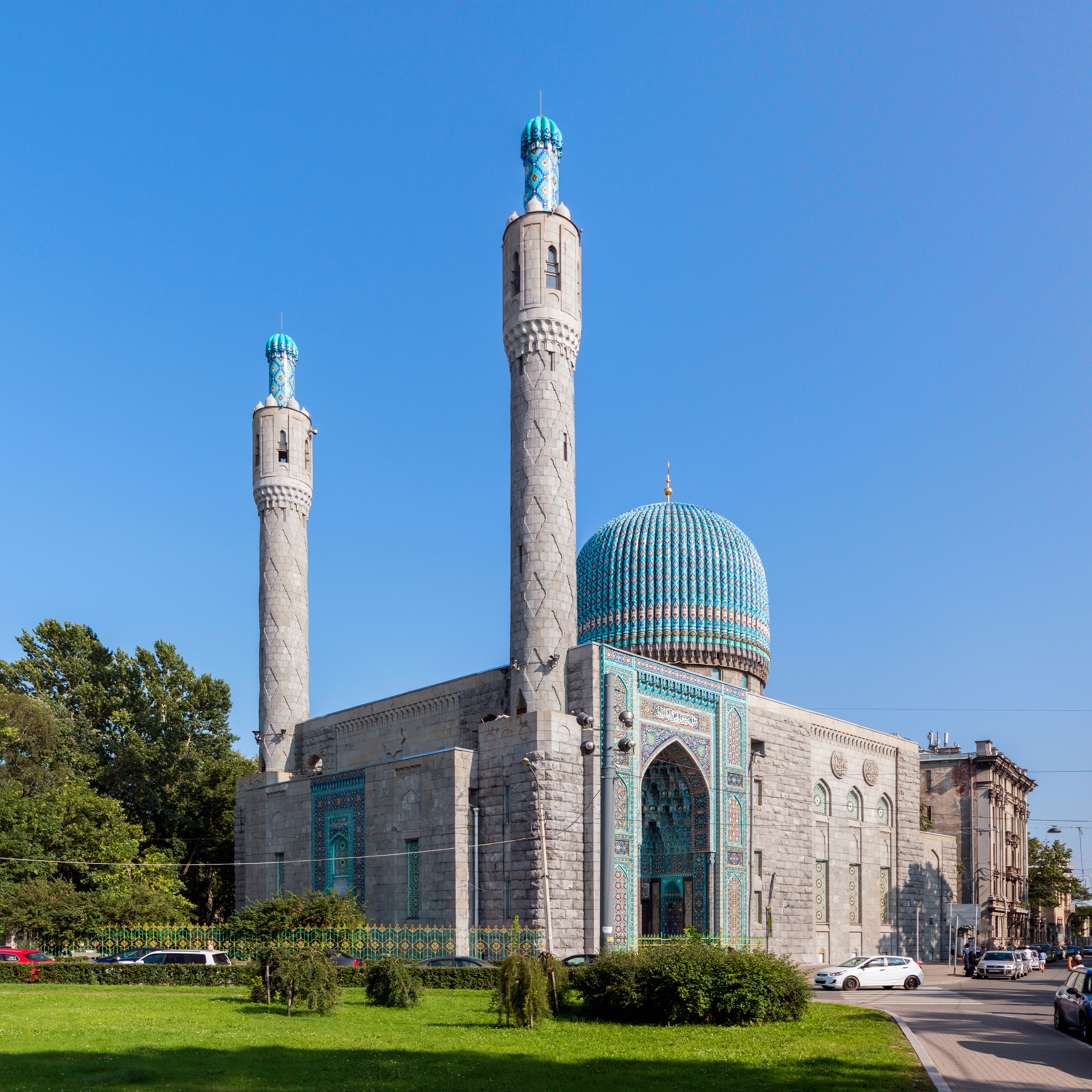
Saint Petersburg Mosque, Kronverksky Prospekt 7, St. Petersburg

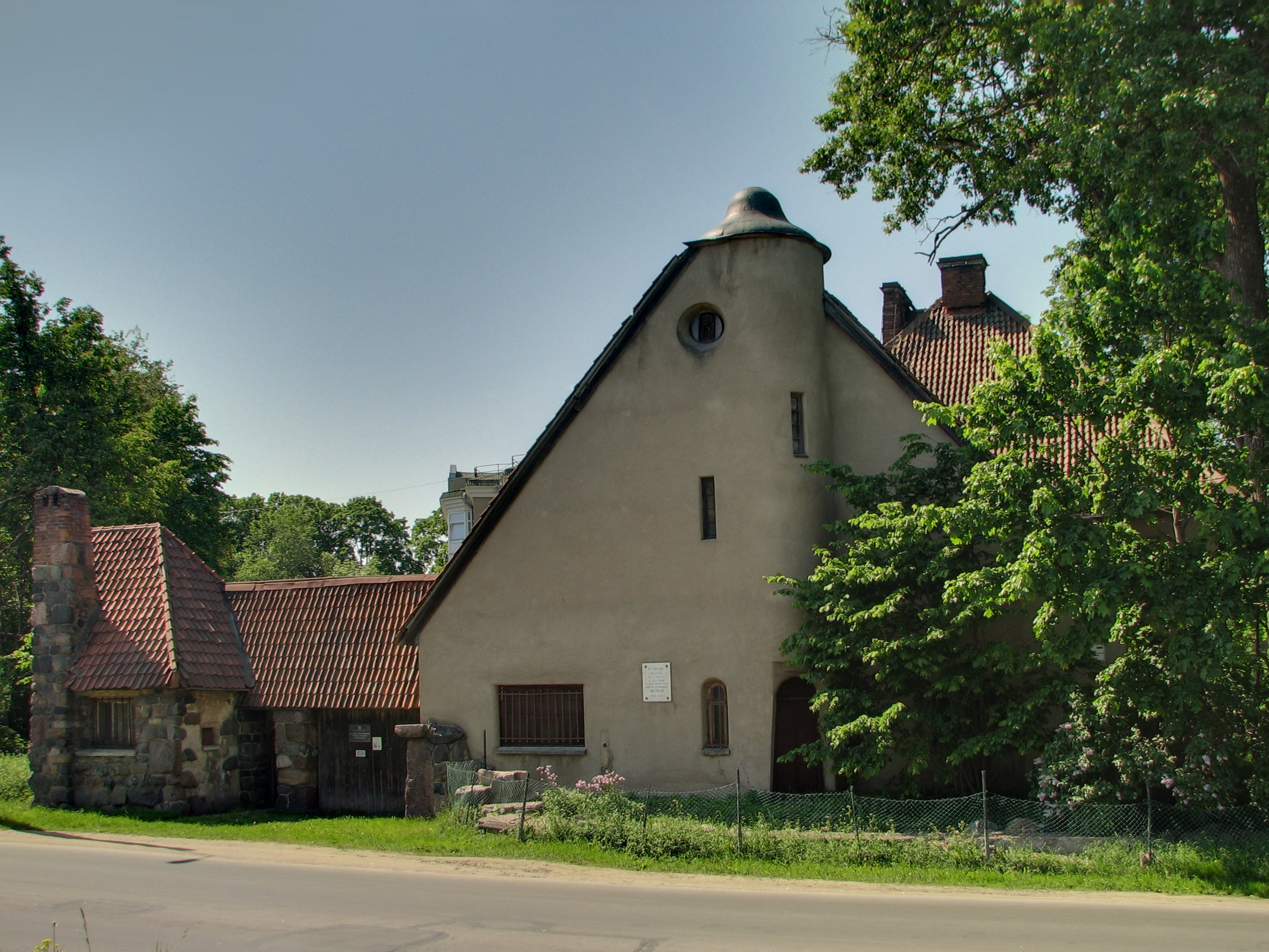
Shcherbov's house, Chekhov Street, 4a, Gatchina

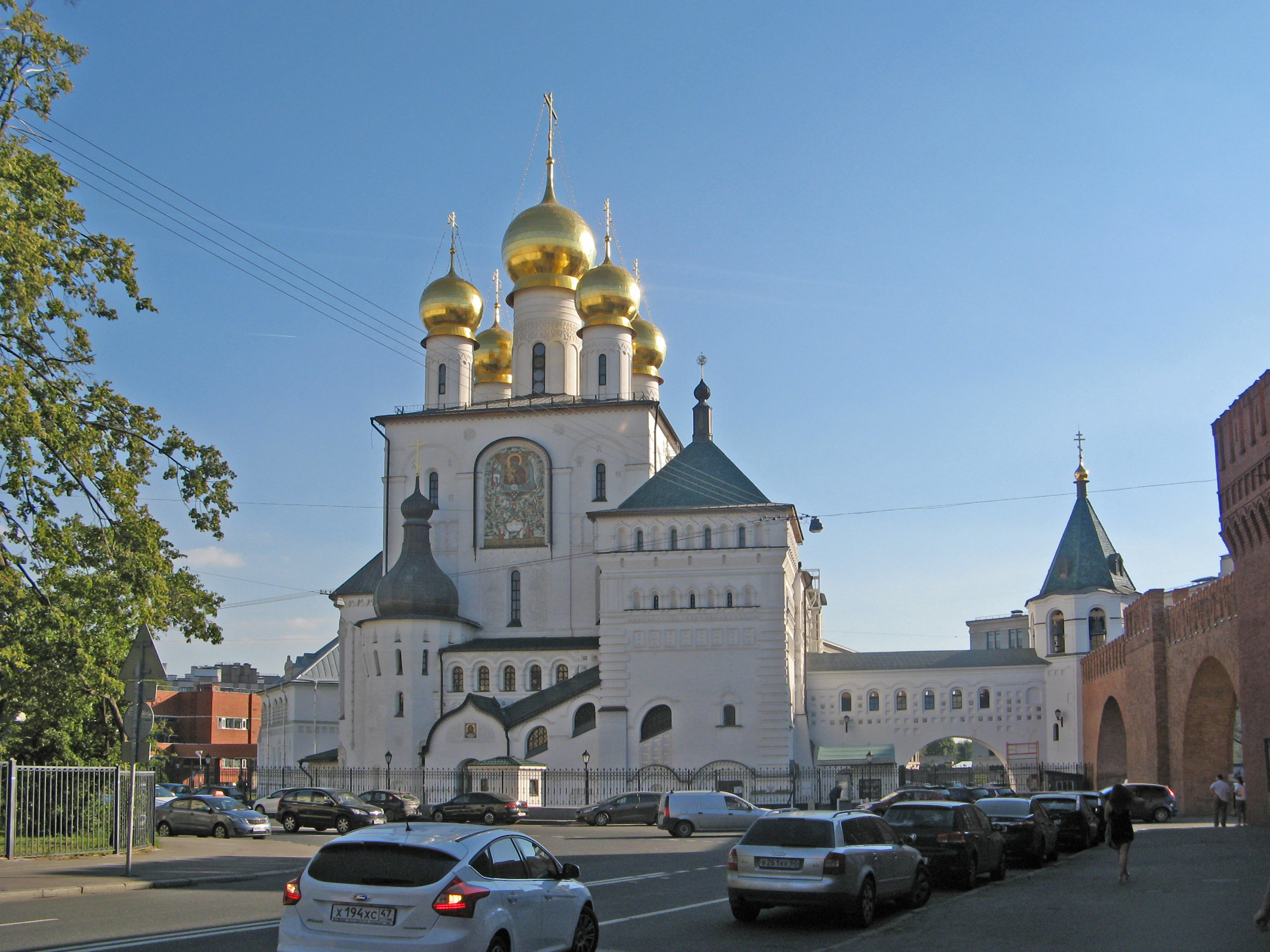
Feodorovskaya Icon Cathedral in Commemoration of the Romanov Tercentenary, Poltavskaya Street, St. Petersburg

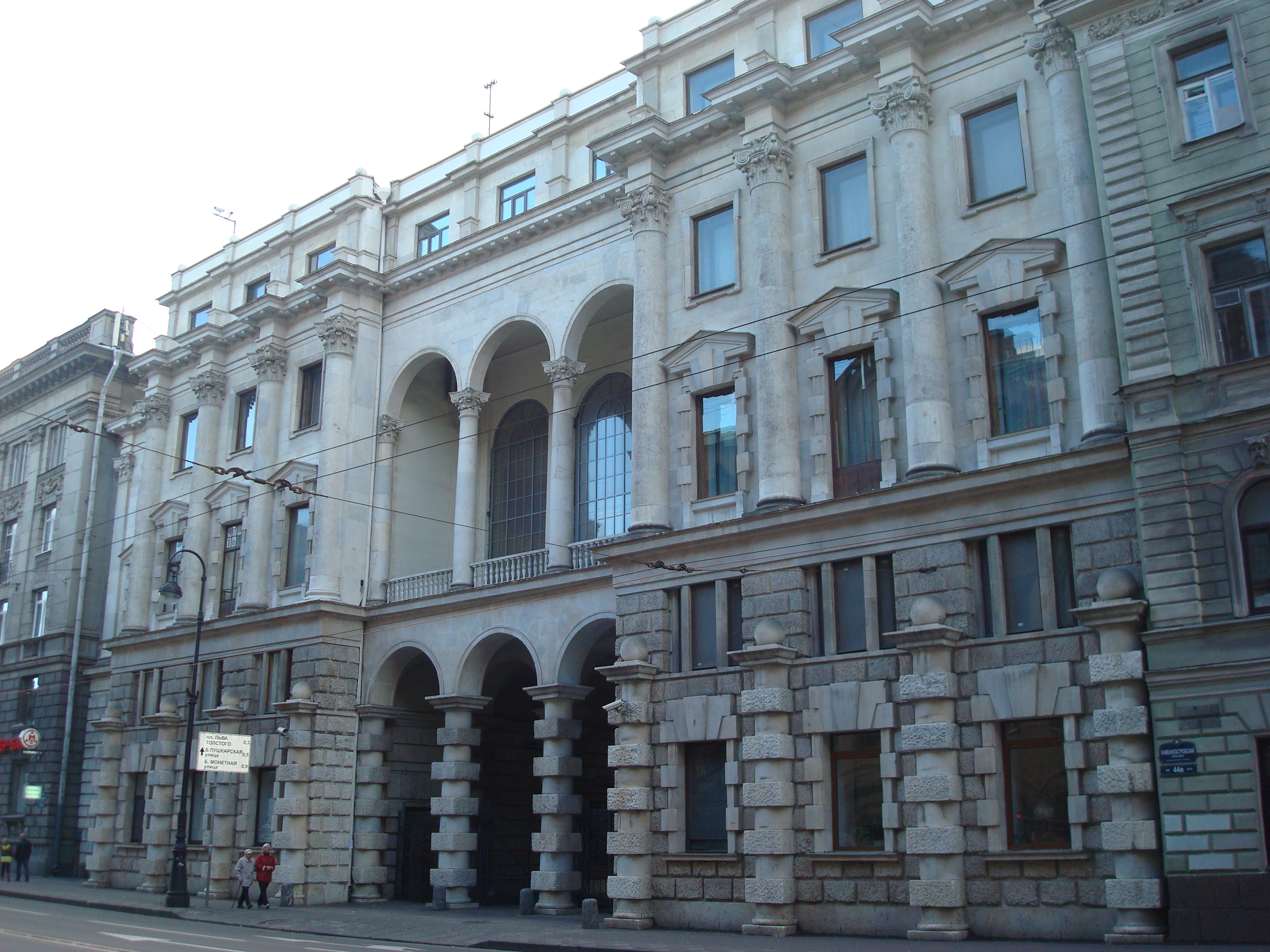
The House of the Emir of Bukhara, Kamennoostrovsky Prospekt 44, St. Petersburg

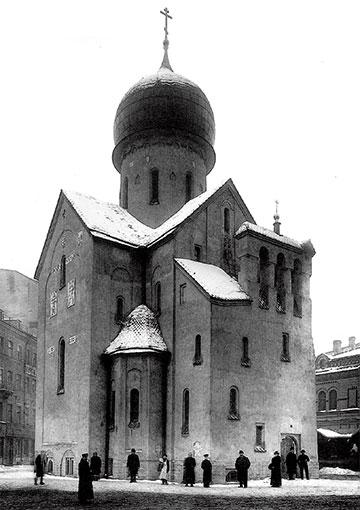
Saint Nicholas of Bari Church of the Imperial Orthodox Palestine Society, Bakunin Prospect 4, St. Petersburg

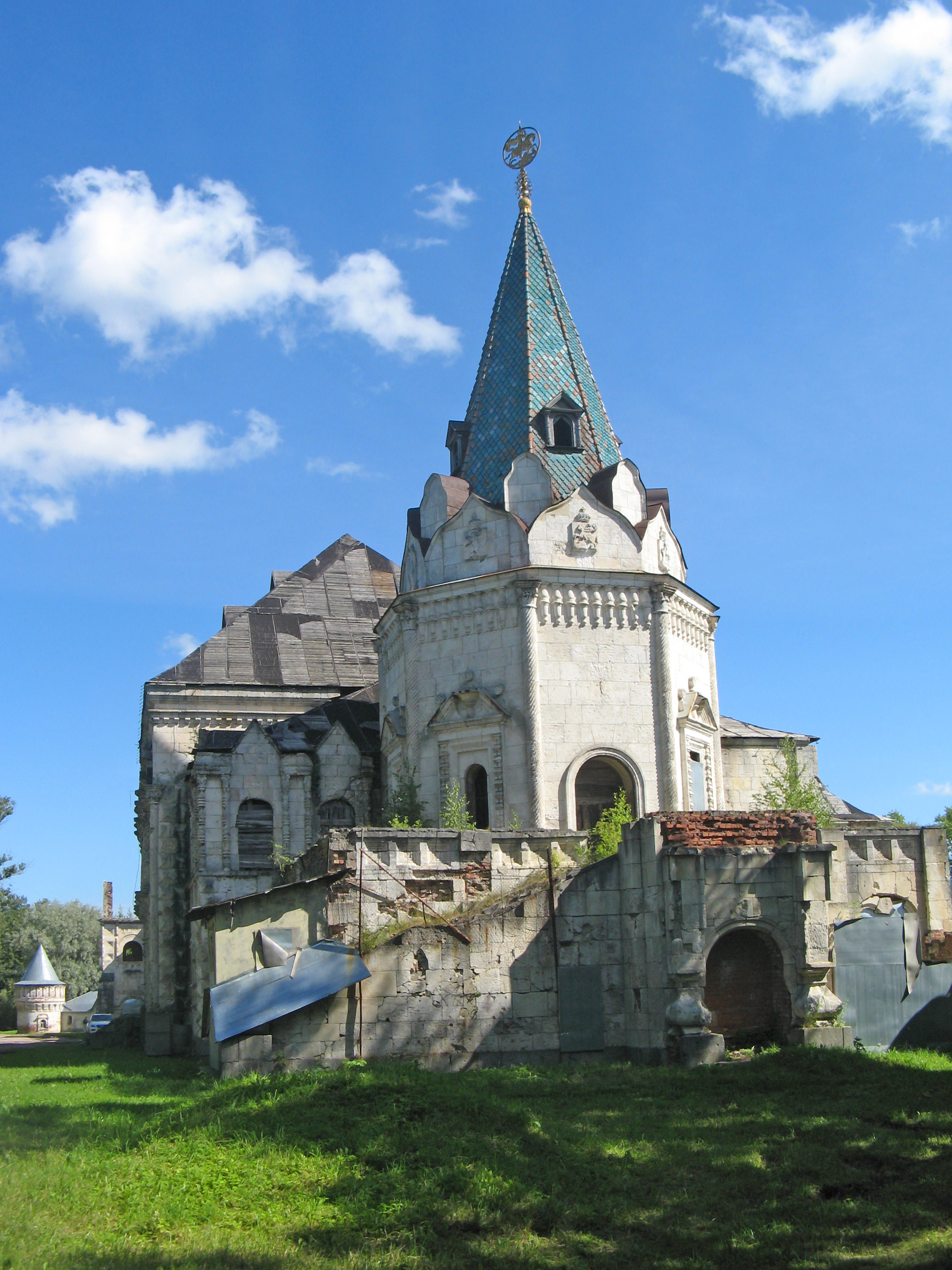
Trapeznaya Palata of the Fedorovsky Gorodok, Academic Prospect 20, Pushkin

== Literature ==
- Архитекторы-строители Петербурга-Петрограда начала XX века. Каталог выставки. // Л., 1982; АХЕ. 1916. С. 162
- Степан Самойлович Кричинский. Некролог // Зодчий, 1924, N 1, С.4-5
- Горюнов В. С., Тубли М. П. Архитектура эпохи модерна. // СПб., 1994. С. 339; Строитель. 1897. Стлб. 720.
- «ЖЗ», Архитектор Кричинский, Петр Новиков
- Кричинский, Степан Самойлович в Справочнике Научных Обществ России
- Кричинский, Степан Самойлович // Энциклопедия Санкт Петербурга
