= Izyayu =

Izyayu Изъяю
- Urban-type settlement
- Interactive map of Izyayu
- Location of Izyayu Izyayu (Komi Republic)
- Coordinates: 65°07′N 56°59′E
- Country: Russia
- Federal subject: Komi Republic
- Urban-type settlement administrative territorySelsoviet: Kozhva Urban-Type Settlement Administrative Territory
- Urban-type settlement status since: 1981

Population (2010 Census)
  - Total: 1,323
  - Estimate (2025): 860 (−35%)

Administrative status
  - Subordinated to: town of republic significance of Pechora

Municipal status
  - Municipal district: Pechora Municipal District
  - Urban settlement: Kozhva Urban Settlement
- Time zone: UTC+3 (MSK)
- Postal code: 169660
- OKTMO ID: 87620103056

Izyayu population
- 2010 Census: 1,323
- 2002 Census: 1,716
- 1989 Census: 2,588

Izyayu (Russian: Изъяю) is an urban locality (an urban-type settlement) under the administrative jurisdiction of the town of republic significance of Pechora in the Komi Republic, Russia. As of the 2010 Census, its population was 1,323.

== History ==
Urban-type settlement status was granted to Izyayu in 1981.

== Administrative and municipal status ==
Within the framework of administrative divisions, the urban-type settlement of Izyayu is subordinated to Kozhva Urban-Type Settlement Administrative Territory, which is in turn subordinated to the town of republic significance of Pechora. Within the framework of municipal divisions, Izyayu is a part of Kozhva Urban Settlement in Pechora Municipal District.
