= Velikodvorye =

Velikodvorye Великодворье
- Selo
- Location within Vladimir Oblast Location within Russia
- Coordinates: 55°13′N 40°38′E
- Country: Russia
- Region: Vladimir Oblast
- District: Gus-Khrustalny District
- Time zone: UTC+3:00

Velikodvorye (Russian: Великодворье) is a rural locality (a selo) in Posyolok Velikodvorsky, Gus-Khrustalny District, Vladimir Oblast, Russia. The population was 29 as of 2010.

== Geography ==
Velikodvorye is located 52 km south of Gus-Khrustalny (the district's administrative centre) by road. Velikodvorsky is the nearest rural locality.
