= New Martyrs and Confessors of the Russian Orthodox Church =

Group of saints persecuted after the October Revolution

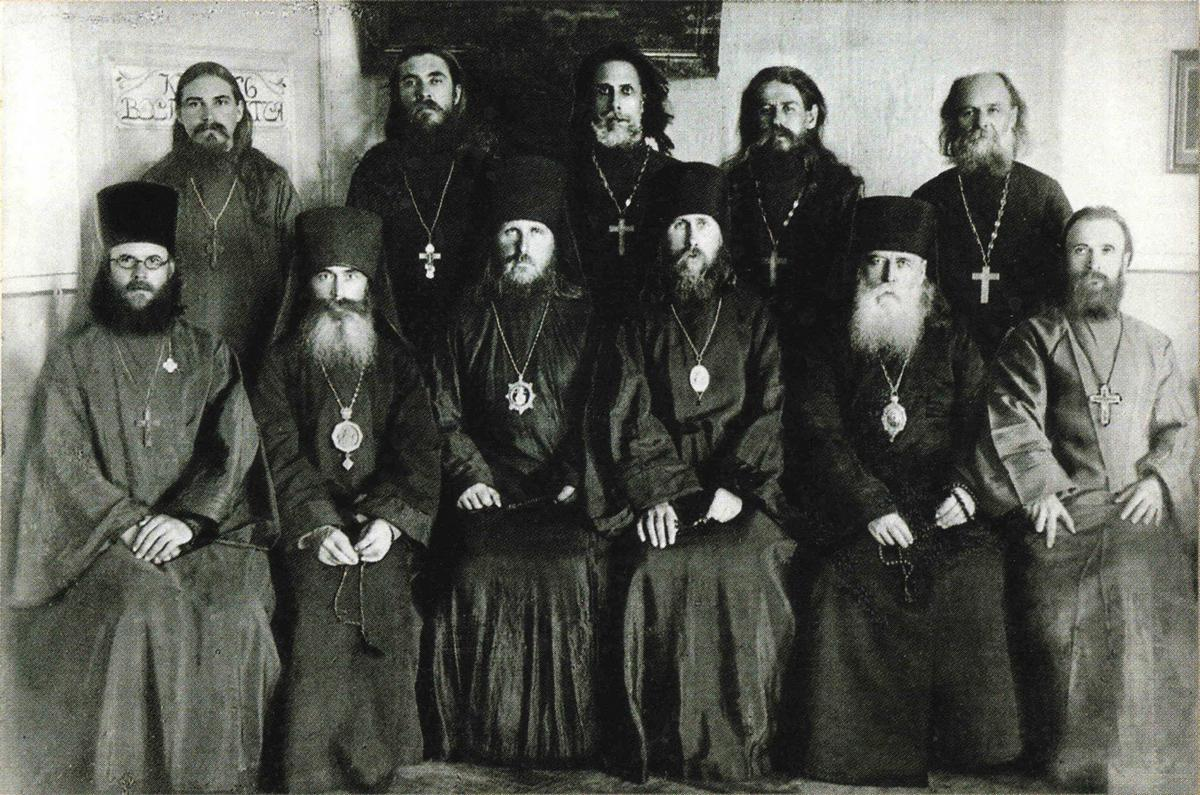
Russian Orthodox clergy in Solovki prison camp, January 1923. Sitting (left to right): priest Alexy Shishkin, Archbishop Mitrophanes Grinyov, archbishop Hilarion Troitsky, мetropolitan Eugene Zyornov, archbishop Zachariah Lobov, archpriest Pavel Chehranov. Standing (left to right): archpriest Simeon Krasnov, archpriest Ilia Pirozhenko, priest Alexy Trifiliev, priest Vladimir Vologurin, archpriest Pyotr Falevich

New Martyrs and Confessors of Russian Church (Russian: Новомученики и исповедники Церкви Русской, before 2013 – New Martyrs and Confessors of Russia, Russian: Новомученики и исповедники российские) is a group of saints of the Russian orthodox church martyred or persecuted after the October Revolution of 1917. Their synaxis (memorial) is held annually at the end of January or beginning of February.

== History of the holiday ==
Shortly after the October Revolution the Local Council on 5 (18) April 1918 passed a resolution: "Set across Russia in the annual memorial on 25 January or next Sunday as day of all confessors and martyrs who died in the current fierce years of persecution".

After "legalization" of the Provisional Patriarchal Holy Synod under Metropolitan Sergius (Stragorodsky) to perestroika Moscow Patriarchate in its official statements was forced to reject facts of persecution for their faith in the USSR. Nevertheless, among the believers in the Soviet Union the honoring of devotees persecuted by the communist authorities continued.

The Russian Orthodox Church Outside of Russia glorified the New Martyrs and Confessors of Russia in 1981.

Prelude to the glorification of the New Martyrs and Confessors of Russia affected by years of revolutionary turmoil and the Bolshevik terror, was the canonization of Patriarch Tikhon on October 9, 1989. In June 1990 during the Local Council Archbishop Herman (Timofeev) of Berlin was the first bishop who openly declared: "We may not deny the countless martyrs for the faith, we must not forget them".

March 25, 1991, the Holy Synod of the Russian Orthodox Church adopted the resolution: "On the resumption of Remembrance services for confessors and martyrs who suffered for their faith in Christ, established by the Local Council" on 5 (18) April 1918.

Immediately following the collapse of the Soviet Union, the Russian Church under the leadership of Patriarch Alexis II began glorifying some of the New Martyrs, beginning with the Grand Duchess Elizabeth Fyodorovna, Metropolitan Vladimir of Kiev, and Metropolitan Benjamin of Petrograd in 1992.

In the 1990s there was a preparation for the canonization of the New Martyrs and Confessors of the Russian Church, many saints were glorified as local saints.

In 2000, the All-Russian Council glorified Tsar Nicholas II and his family, as well as many other New Martyrs. More names continue to be added to list of New Martyrs, after the Synodal Canonization Commission completes its investigation of each case. The Russian Church celebrates the feast of the New Martyrs and Confessors of Russia on the Sunday nearest January 25 (o.s.) / February 7 (n.s.) – the date Metropolitan Vladimir of Kiev's martyrdom (the first Hieromartyr under Bolshevik rule of Russia following the October Revolution).

== Troparion and Kontakion ==
Troparion:

Tone 4: O ye holy hierarchs, royal passion-bearers and pastors, /
monks and laymen, ye countless new-martyrs, and confessors, /
men, women and children, /
flowers of the spiritual meadow of Russia, /
who blossomed forth wondrously in time of grievous persecutions /
bearing good fruit for Christ in your endurance: /
Entreat Him as the One who planted you, /
that He deliver His people from godless and evil men, /
and that the Church of Russia and all the world/
be made steadfast through your blood and suffering, //
unto the salvation of our souls.

Kontakion:

Tone 2: O ye new passion-bearers of Russia, /
who have with your confession finished the course of this earth, /
receiving boldness through your sufferings: /
Beseech Christ Who strengthened you, /
that we also, whenever the hour of trial find us /
may receive the gift of courage from God. /
For ye are a witness to us who venerate your struggle, /
that neither tribulation, prison, nor death //
can separate us from the love of God.
