= Pechora Kamenka (air base) =

Airport in Komi Republic, Russia

Pechora Kamenka Berezovka
- Pechora, Komi Republic in Russia
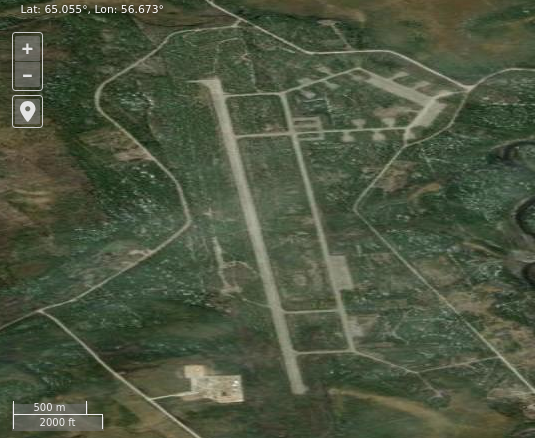
- Satellite imagery of former Pechora Kamenka air base

Site information
- Type: Air Base
- Owner: Ministry of Defence
- Operator: Russian Air Force

Location
- Shown within Komi Republic Pechora Kamenka (Russia)
- Coordinates: 65°3′18″N 56°40′24″E

Site history
- Built: 1970
- In use: 1970 - 1998

Airfield information
- Identifiers: ICAO: XUYR
- Elevation: 91 metres (299 ft) AMSL
Runways
Direction	Length and surface
15/33	3,050 metres (10,007 ft) Concrete

Pechora Kamenka (also Kamenka or Berezovka) is a former air base in Komi Republic, Russia located 27 km west of Pechora. It was a medium-size bomber base, with about 12 hardstands and small tarmacs.

In 1989, the 144th independent Aviation Regiment for Long-Range Radar Detection (144 OAPDRLO) which operated the Beriev A-50 Airborne Early Warning aircraft arrived from Šiauliai in Lithuania. It stayed until November 1998 when it was moved to Ivanovo Severny and redesignated the 2457th Aviation Base.

== See also ==
- List of military airbases in Russia
