= Kubyshka =

Type of East Slavic ceramic vessel

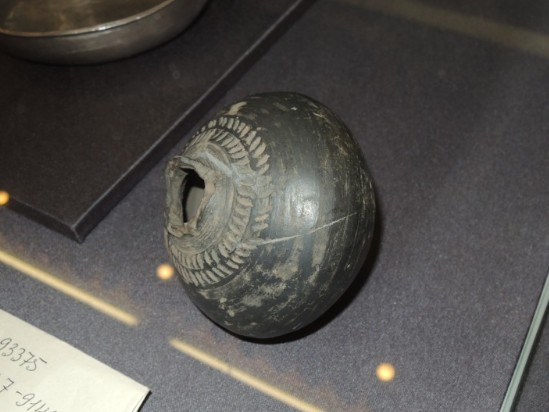
Kubyshka, 17th century

Kubyshka is an early East Slavic ceramic jar or pot with narrow hole, short or absent neck and wide, rounded body. In the past the term kubyshka, a diminutive derivation from the word Куб (kub) in the generic meaning of "container", had a broader meaning of various rounded containers, e.g. a barrel or birch bark kubyshka.

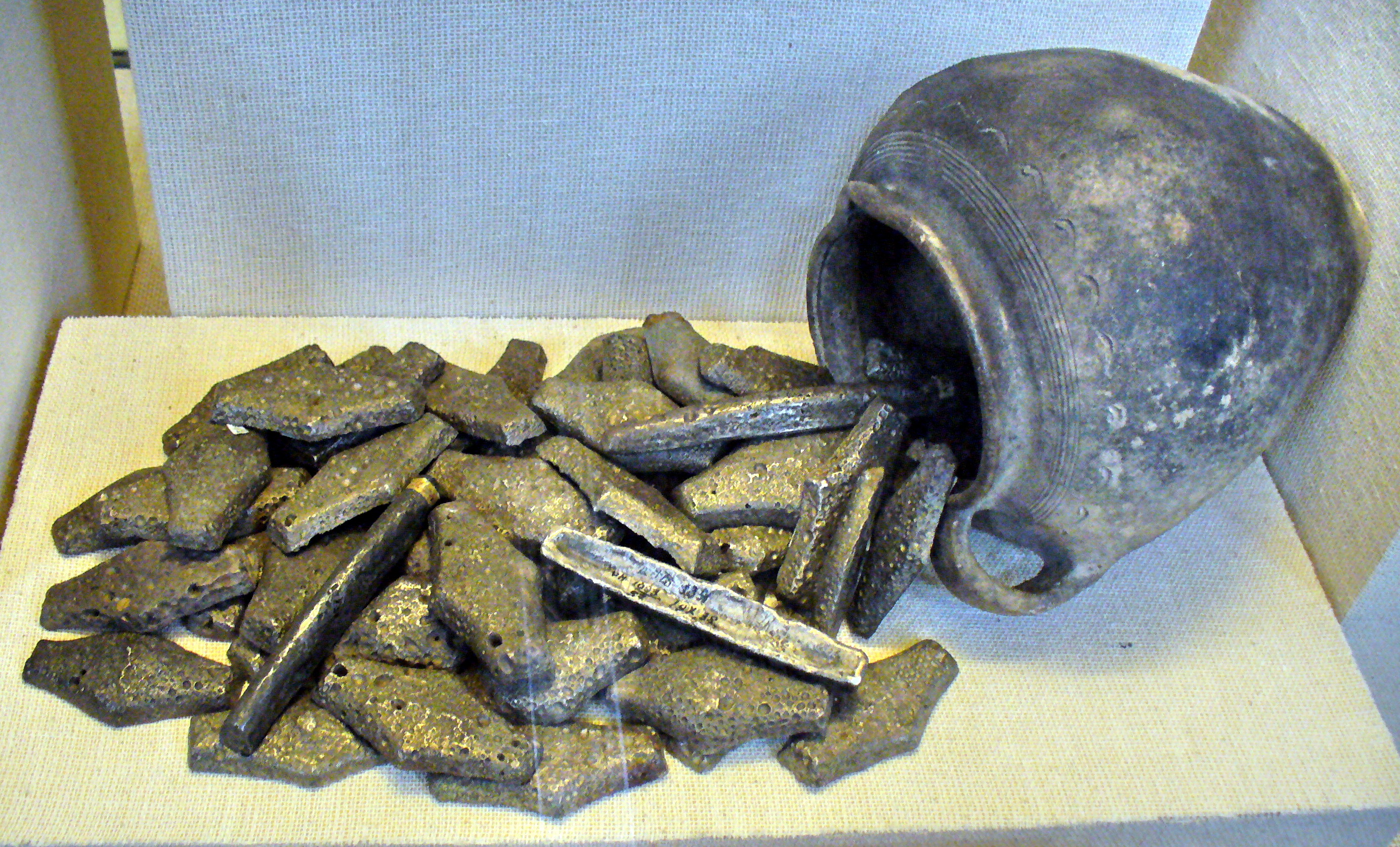
A 12-13th century hoard in kubyshka

The word has become associated with buried hoards and is used in a number of idioms associated with hoarding or reserve saving (держать в кубышке (keep in a kubyshka), класть в кубышку (put into a kubyshka), etc.).

The word is also used as a euphemism or a nickname for a short, plump person. For example, in Sergei Prokofiev's ballet Cinderella, a wicked stepsister's nickname Kubyshka was variously translated as Fatty, Dumpy, etc. Grand Duchess Anastasia, the daughter of tsar Nicholas II of Russia was nicknamed "Kubyshka".
