= Kozhva =

Kozhva Кожва
- Urban-type settlement
- Interactive map of Kozhva
- Location of Kozhva Kozhva (Komi Republic)
- Coordinates: 65°07′N 57°03′E
- Country: Russia
- Federal subject: Komi Republic
- Urban-type settlement administrative territorySelsoviet: Kozhva Urban-Type Settlement Administrative Territory
- Urban-type settlement status since: 1952

Population (2010 Census)
  - Total: 3,047
  - Estimate (2025): 1,673 (−45.1%)

Administrative status
  - Subordinated to: town of republic significance of Pechora
  - Capital of: Kozhva Urban-Type Settlement Administrative Territory

Municipal status
  - Municipal district: Pechora Municipal District
  - Urban settlement: Kozhva Urban Settlement
  - Capital of: Kozhva Urban Settlement
- Time zone: UTC+3 (MSK)
- Postal code: 169663
- OKTMO ID: 87620103051

Kozhva population
- 2010 Census: 3,047
- 2002 Census: 3,549
- 1989 Census: 5,818
- 1979 Census: 6,640

Kozhva (Russian: Ко́жва) is an urban locality (an urban-type settlement) under the administrative jurisdiction of the town of republic significance of Pechora in the Komi Republic, Russia. As of the 2010 Census, its population was 3,047.

== History ==
Urban-type settlement status was granted to Kozhva in 1952.

== Administrative and municipal status ==
Within the framework of administrative divisions, the urban-type settlement of Kozhva, together with the urban-type settlement of Izyayu and six rural localities, is incorporated as Kozhva Urban-Type Settlement Administrative Territory, which is subordinated to the town of republic significance of Pechora. As a municipal division, Kozhva Urban-Type Settlement Administrative Territory is incorporated within Pechora Municipal District as Kozhva Urban Settlement.
