= Lev Egorov =

Archimandrite Lev (Leonid Mikhailovich Egorov; February 26, 1889 - September 20, 1937) - clergyman of the Russian Orthodox Church, brother of Metropolitan Gurij (Egorov).

In July 2003, he was glorified as a hieromartyr by the Holy Synod of the Russian Orthodox Church.

== Education and monasticism ==
Leonid Egorov graduated from the Faculty of History and Philology of the St. Petersburg University. Then in 1915 he entered the Petrograd Theological Academy and studied there for three years. In 1918, the Academy was closed.

At the end of 1915, Leonid was tonsured a monk of the Alexander Nevsky Lavra with the name Lev, and ordained hierodeacon and later hieromonk; in the same year his brother Vyacheslav took monastic vows with the name Gurij.

== Alexander Nevsky Brotherhood ==
In 1916 Hieromonk Lev, along with his brother ("the Egorov brothers", as people started to call them at that time), and with Hieromonk Innokentij (Tikhonov), with the permission of the Diocesan authorities, started intensive missionary activity. They “went to the people,” that is, they turned to the workers and poor people living in the area of Ligovsky Prospekt. In 1918, according to Metropolitan Ioann (Wendland), “The fame of the ‘Egorov brothers’ spread throughout the city.”

At the beginning of 1919, the “Egorov brothers” organized the Alexander Nevsky Brotherhood at the Lavra with the blessing of Metropolitan Benjamin of Petrograd. After the beginning of the Renovationism movement, inspired by the Soviet authorities, and of the 1922 seizure of church valuables in Russia campaign, hieromonk Lev was arrested (June 16, 1922) and subsequently deported from Petrograd. He served almost two years of exile, first in the Orenburg province, and then in the West Kazakhstan region near Lake Elton. During his absence from Petrograd, despite the repressions, the functioning of the Alexander Nevsky Brotherhood did not stop. In 1924, the period of exile ended.

Then hieromonk Lev was elevated to the rank of archimandrite and in March 1926 was appointed a dean of the monastic town residences in Leningrad. Besides that, he was teaching Russian literature in the Theological and Pastoral School and was also a member of its pedagogical council.

In October 1926, archimandrite Lev was appointed rector of the Feodorovskaya Icon Cathedral in Leningrad. Gradually, most of the members of the Brotherhood and, in 1930, two Brotherhood choirs moved there.

In the spring of 1927 archimandrite Lev was arrested for the second time. At this time, about 70 people were studying at the Theological-Pastoral School, and its popularity began to irritate the authorities, who instructed the GPU/SPD to fabricate "the case of the Theological-Pastoral School". However, the case fell apart. On November 19, 1927, all those arrested were released under recognizance, and a year later, on November 10, 1928, the case was dropped altogether.

Despite its virtually illegal existence, under the leadership of Archimandrite Lev the Alexander Nevsky Brotherhood continued social and charitable activities, which were strictly prohibited by Soviet laws. On the night of February 17–18, 1932, 500 people were arrested, including more than 40 members of the Alexander Nevsky Brotherhood. The investigation was carried out in an expedited manner. On March 22, 1932, the visiting commission of the OGPU/JSPD Collegium sentenced the defendants. Archimandrite Lev was sentenced to the maximum sentence - 10 years in a Correctional labour camp.

== Imprisonment in Siblag and death ==
On April 18, 1932, archimandrite Lev entered the Chernaya Rechka department of the Siberian labour camp (Sibirsky ITL, SIBULON, Siblag), located in the West Siberian region. In the end of April he started working in the mine located near the village Osinniki near Novokuznetsk. The work was extremely hard. The camp authorities accused the archimandrite of counter-revolutionary agitation among prisoners, and a special commission of the OGPU decided to transfer him to a punishment cell for a period of 2 years, and an NKVD troika increased his term of imprisonment in a forced labor camp by 2 years.

At the end of March 1936, archimandrite Lev was transferred from the isolation ward to the Akhpun department of Siblag (to the Akhpun station, modern Temirtau). Here he still worked in the mine, sometimes transporting trolleys with rock for 14 hours a day. In 1937, another criminal case was fabricated against him. On September 13, an NKVD Troika sentenced archimandrite Lev to capital punishment. He was shot on September 20, 1937. There is no information about the place of execution and burial in the archival investigation file.

Officially, his relatives were informed that he died in the camp in 1942.

== Literature ==
- Шкаровский М. В. Александро-Невское братство 1918—1932 годы. — СПб., 2003.
- Священномученик архимандрит Лев (Егоров). // Шкаровский М. На земле была одна столица…. — СПб, 2009. — С. 22—55.
- Шкаровский М. В. Лев (Егоров) // Православная энциклопедия. — М., 2015. — Т. XL : «Лангтон — Ливан». — С. 214-217. — 752 с. — 33 000 экз. — ISBN 978-5-89572-033-2.
