= Pechora =

Town in the Komi Republic, Russia

Pechora Печора
- Town

Other transcription(s)
  - Komi: Печӧра
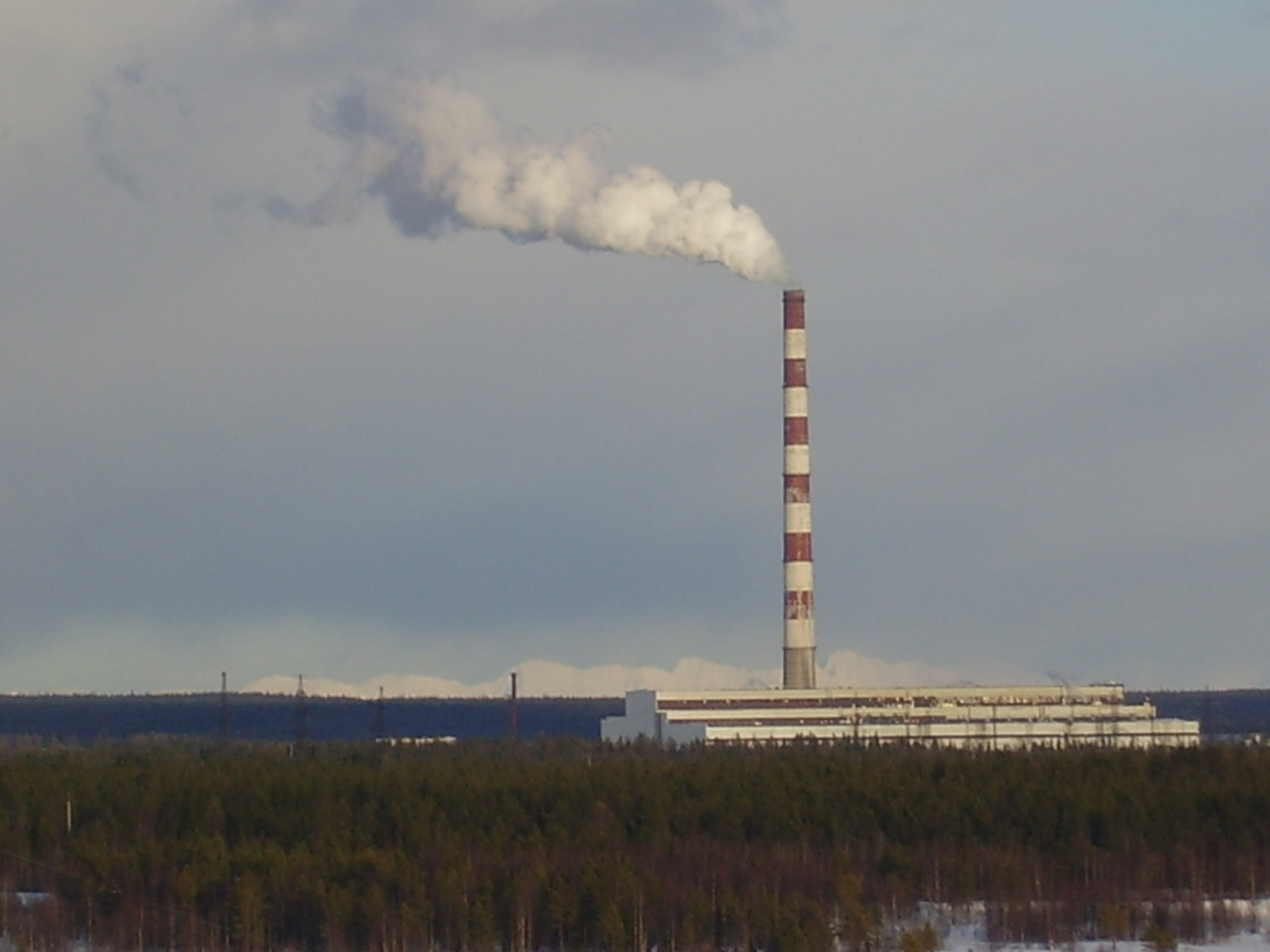

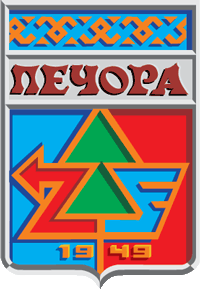
- Flag Coat of arms
- Interactive map of Pechora
- Location of Pechora Pechora (Komi Republic)
- Coordinates: 65°10′N 57°15′E
- Country: Russia
- Federal subject: Komi Republic
- Founded: 1940
- Town status since: 1949

Government
  - Head: Alexander Shabanov

Area
  - Total: 28.9 km^{2} (11.2 sq mi)
- Elevation: 59 m (194 ft)

Population (2010 Census)
  - Total: 43,105
  - Estimate (2025): 33,766 (−21.7%)
  - Density: 1,490/km^{2} (3,860/sq mi)

Administrative status
  - Subordinated to: town of republic significance of Pechora
  - Capital of: town of republic significance of Pechora

Municipal status
  - Municipal district: Pechora Municipal District
  - Urban settlement: Pechora Urban Settlement
  - Capital of: Pechora Municipal District, Pechora Urban Settlement
- Time zone: UTC+3 (MSK)
- Postal codes: 169600, 169601, 169606, 169607, 169609, 169615, 169616, 169619, 169669
- Dialing code: +7 82142
- OKTMO ID: 87620101001
- Website: www.pechoraonline.ru

Pechora (Russian: Печора; Komi: Печӧра, romanized: Pećöra) is a town in the Komi Republic, Russia, located on the Pechora River, west of and near the northern Ural Mountains. The area of the town is 28.9 square kilometres (11.2 mi^{2}). Population: 43,105 (2010 census); 48,700 (2002 census); 64,746 (1989 Soviet census).

== History ==
Pechora was granted town status in 1950. Pechora was also the site of a Stalin-era gulag that operated from 1932 to 1953, although it was partially emptied in 1941 as many of the inmates were forced into service in the Red Army. There is a dedicated room at the Pechora museum where they display many of the records and artifacts that were recovered from the gulag.

In the 1990s memorials were erected to commemorate those who died in the camp infirmary.

== Administrative and municipal status ==
Within the framework of administrative divisions, the town of Pechora is, together with two urban-type settlement administrative territories (comprising the urban-type settlements of Kozhva and Puteyets and eleven rural localities) and four rural-type settlement administrative territories (comprising seventeen rural localities), incorporated as the town of republic significance of Pechora—an administrative unit with the status equal to that of the districts. As a municipal division, the town of republic significance of Pechora is incorporated as Pechora Municipal District; the town of Pechora is incorporated within it as Pechora Urban Settlement. The two urban-type settlement administrative territories are incorporated into two urban settlements, and the four rural-type settlement administrative territories are incorporated into four rural settlements within the municipal district.

== Local government ==
Heads of the Pechora Urban Settlement:

- Vladimir Mennikov (United Russia), October 2008 - October 2012
- Konstantin Garkais (United Russia), 18 October 2012 - 25 December 2012
- Vladimir Anischik (United Russia), 25 December 2012 - September 2015
- Alexander Shabanov (A Just Russia), September 2015 - 30 September 2021
- Alexander Baka (United Russia), 30 September 2021 - current

== Transportation ==
The town is served by the Pechora Airport and the Pechora Railway.

== Military ==
Pechora Kamenka military air base and Pechora Radar Station are located nearby.

== Climate ==
Pechora has a subarctic climate (Köppen climate classification Dfc). Winters are very cold, with average low temperatures in January of −22.5 °C (−8.5 °F) in January. Summers are mild, with average high temperatures in July of +21.7 °C (71.1 °F). Precipitation is moderate and is somewhat higher in summer than at other times of the year.

Climate data for Pechora
Month	Jan	Feb	Mar	Apr	May	Jun	Jul	Aug	Sep	Oct	Nov	Dec	Year
Record high °C (°F)	2.5 (36.5)	2.9 (37.2)	11.6 (52.9)	21.9 (71.4)	32.6 (90.7)	34.1 (93.4)	35.0 (95.0)	32.4 (90.3)	27.6 (81.7)	20.0 (68.0)	7.7 (45.9)	3.5 (38.3)	35.0 (95.0)
Mean daily maximum °C (°F)	−14.0 (6.8)	−12.2 (10.0)	−3.7 (25.3)	3.2 (37.8)	10.5 (50.9)	17.9 (64.2)	21.8 (71.2)	17.1 (62.8)	10.9 (51.6)	2.4 (36.3)	−6.6 (20.1)	−11.1 (12.0)	3.0 (37.4)
Daily mean °C (°F)	−17.9 (−0.2)	−16.4 (2.5)	−8.8 (16.2)	−2.1 (28.2)	5.1 (41.2)	12.3 (54.1)	16.1 (61.0)	12.2 (54.0)	7.1 (44.8)	−0.1 (31.8)	−9.7 (14.5)	−14.6 (5.7)	−1.4 (29.5)
Mean daily minimum °C (°F)	−21.8 (−7.2)	−20.4 (−4.7)	−13.6 (7.5)	−6.9 (19.6)	0.4 (32.7)	7.5 (45.5)	11.0 (51.8)	8.3 (46.9)	4.1 (39.4)	−2.3 (27.9)	−12.8 (9.0)	−18.3 (−0.9)	−5.4 (22.3)
Record low °C (°F)	−54.7 (−66.5)	−56.0 (−68.8)	−44.7 (−48.5)	−35.7 (−32.3)	−23.3 (−9.9)	−5.6 (21.9)	0.1 (32.2)	−3.1 (26.4)	−9.5 (14.9)	−33.9 (−29.0)	−43.3 (−45.9)	−52.5 (−62.5)	−56.0 (−68.8)
Average precipitation mm (inches)	41.8 (1.65)	32.7 (1.29)	33.6 (1.32)	37.7 (1.48)	46.0 (1.81)	73.4 (2.89)	69.1 (2.72)	77.9 (3.07)	64.7 (2.55)	65.2 (2.57)	52.7 (2.07)	48.1 (1.89)	642.9 (25.31)
Average rainy days	2	1	3	9	16	20	19	23	23	17	6	4	143
Average snowy days	25	21	21	12	6	1	0	0	1	11	20	24	142
Mean monthly sunshine hours	9	56	124	195	207	294	304	189	96	50	15	3	1,542
Source 1: pogoda.ru.net
Source 2: http://en.allmetsat.com/climate/russia.php?code=23418

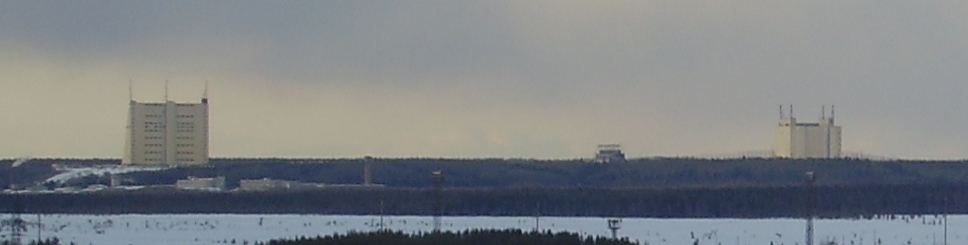
Daryal radar at Pechora

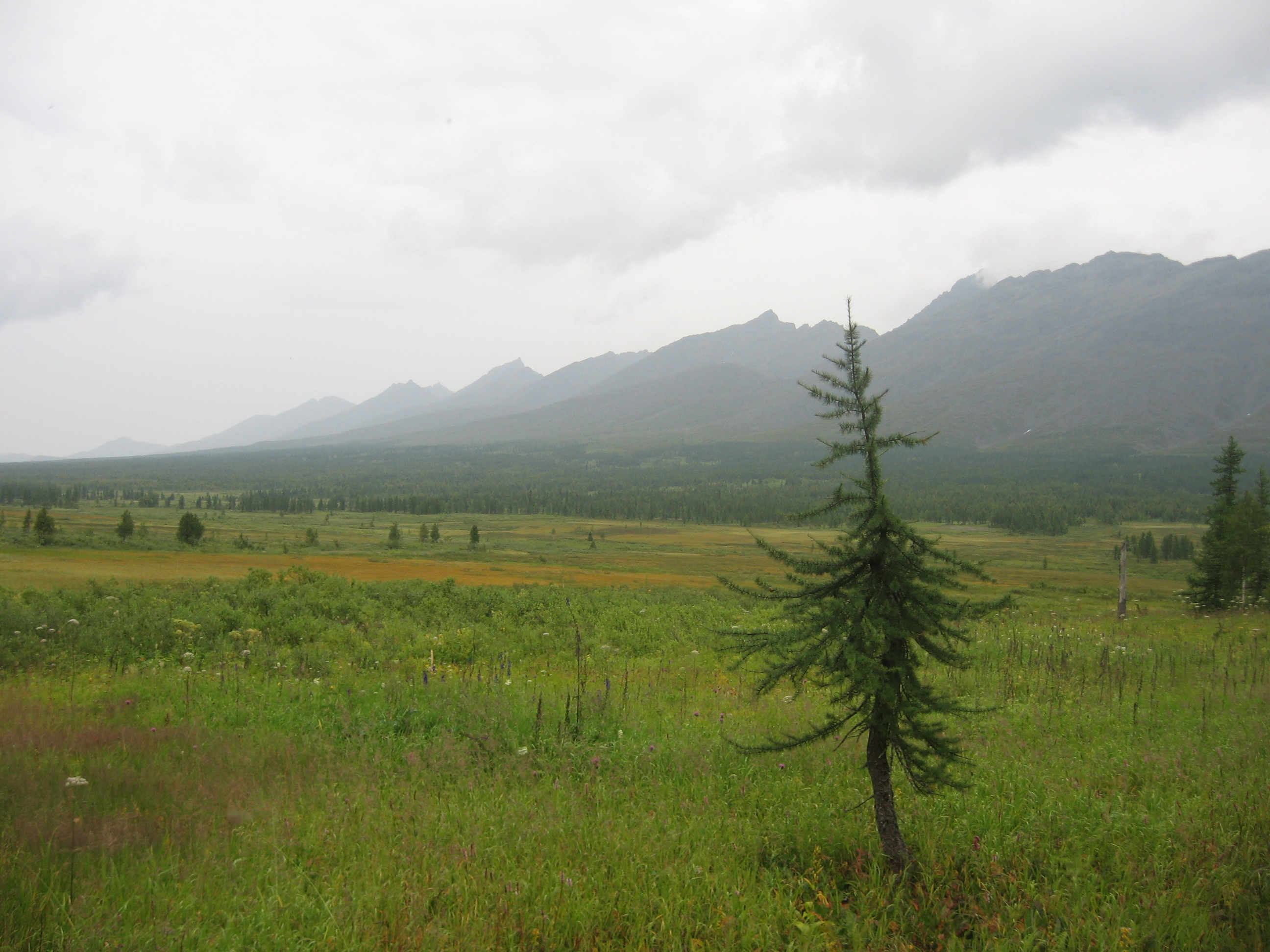
View of Sablya Reserve outside Pechora
