= Belaya Gora =

Belaya Gora may refer to:

- Belaya Gora Urban Settlement, a municipal formation into which the Settlement of Belaya Gora in Abyysky District of the Sakha Republic, Russia is incorporated
- Belaya Gora (inhabited locality), several inhabited localities in Russia
- Belaya Gora Airport, an airport in the Sakha Republic, Russia
