= Chersky Airport =

Airport in Sakha, Russia

Chersky
- IATA: CYX; ICAO: UESS; LID: ЧРС

Summary
- Airport type: Public
- Location: Chersky
- Elevation AMSL: 20 ft (6.1 m)
- Coordinates: 68°44′36″N 161°20′12″E

Map
- Location of the airport in the Sakha Republic

Runways
| Direction | Length | | Surface |
| Direction | ft | m | Surface |
|---|---|---|---|
| 13/31 | 5,577 | 1,700 | Asphalt |

Chersky Airport (also Cherskiy) (IATA: CYX, ICAO: UESS) is a small airport in the Sakha Republic, Russia, located 1 kilometer (0.62 mi) south of the settlement of Chersky. It services small transport aircraft.

== History ==
In November 1934, according to the action plan for the development of the Northern Sea Route (NSR), a group of flight and technical personnel with five R-5 and two U-2 aircraft were delivered to Providence Bay, and in March 1935 the aircraft were transported to Cape Schmidt, where the preparation of their base for flights between the settlements of Anadyr, Provideniya, Vankarem, Cape Schmidt. The first airport staff arrived in August 1940, led by the head of the airport, I. N. Kholutova. The first unpaved airfield was built on Vankin Island, 25 km from Nizhniye Kresty, but later a flat place was found on the spit of the Panteleikha River, where the airfield is now located.

Since 1968, the Nizhnekolyma Aviation Enterprise based at the airport - later the Kolyma-Indigirsky Aviation Enterprise (KIAP), the Kolyma-Indigirsky United Aviation Detachment (KIOAO) - provided the activities of drifting stations (starting from the North Pole-16 station), and in 1979, aviators participated in supporting the scientific and sports expedition of 'Komsomolskaya Pravda' under the leadership of Dmitry Shparo. From 1983 to 1997, KIAP and KIOAO were handled by Georgy Aleksandrovich Yachmenev.

For their great contribution to aviation support for the navigation of sea vessels, scientific drifting stations "North Pole", servicing the northern regions and in connection with the 50th anniversary of the founding of the Northern Sea Route, by decree of the Presidium of the Supreme Council of the USSR on December 16, 1982, KIOAO of the Yakut Civil Aviation Administration of the USSR Ministry of Civil Aviation was awarded the Order of the Badge of Honour.

In 1996, KIOAO (which already included 6 airports: Tiksi, Chokurdakh, Srednekolymsk, Zyryanka, Belaya Gora, Chersky) was renamed to the Arctic Aviation Enterprise, then (in 1998) - the Chersky branch of the state unitary enterprise "Polar Airlines", and in 2001 the state unitary enterprise “Chersky Airport” was formed.

== Airlines and destinations ==
| Airlines | Destinations |
|---|---|
| Polar Airlines | Yakutsk |

== See also ==
- List of airports in Russia
