= Dyosku =

Dyosku Дёску Дьооску (Yakut)
- Selo
- Interactive map of Dyosku
- Location of Dyosku Dyosku (Sakha Republic)
- Coordinates: 68°21′09″N 144°16′49″E
- Country: Russia
- Federal subject: Sakha Republic
- Administrative district: Abyysky District
- Rural okrugSelsoviet: Abyysky Rural Okrug
- Founded: 1928

Population (2010 Census)
  - Total: 53
  - Estimate (2021): 47 (−11.3%)

Municipal status
  - Municipal district: Abyysky Municipal District
  - Rural settlement: Abyysky Rural Settlement
- Time zone: UTC+11 (MSK+8)
- Postal code: 678894
- OKTMO ID: 98601404106

Dyosku (Russian: Дёску; Yakut: Дьооску, Coosku) is a rural locality (a selo), and one of two settlements in Abyysky Rural Okrug of Abyysky District in the Sakha Republic, Russia, in addition to Abyy, the administrative center of the Rural Okrug. It is located 110 kilometers (68 mi) from Belaya Gora, the administrative center of the district and 30 kilometers (19 mi) from Abyy. Its population as of the 2010 Census was 53; down from 87 recorded in the 2002 Census.
