= Keng-Kyuyol =

Keng-Kyuyol (Russian: Кенг-Кюёль) is the name of several rural localities in the Sakha Republic, Russia.

- Keng-Kyuyol, Abyysky District, Sakha Republic, a selo in Uolbutsky Rural Okrug of Abyysky District
- Keng-Kyuyol, Verkhnevilyuysky District, Sakha Republic, a selo in Surguluksky Rural Okrug of Verkhnevilyuysky District
