= Belaya Gora (inhabited locality) =

Belaya Gora (Russian: Белая Гора) is the name of several inhabited localities in Russia.

Urban localities

- Belaya Gora, Sakha Republic, an urban-type settlement in Abyysky District of the Sakha Republic

Rural localities

- Belaya Gora, Kholmogorsky Selsoviet, Kholmogorsky District, Arkhangelsk Oblast, a village in Kholmogorsky Selsoviet of Kholmogorsky District in Arkhangelsk Oblast
- Belaya Gora, Yemetsky Selsoviet, Kholmogorsky District, Arkhangelsk Oblast, a village in Yemetsky Selsoviet of Kholmogorsky District in Arkhangelsk Oblast
- Belaya Gora, Karachay-Cherkess Republic, a settlement in Karachayevsky District of the Karachay-Cherkess Republic; 43°54′N 41°55′E
- Belaya Gora, Republic of Karelia, a village in Kondopozhsky District of the Republic of Karelia
- Belaya Gora, Kirov Oblast, a village in Shestakovsky Rural Okrug of Slobodskoy District in Kirov Oblast; 59°3′N 49°57′E
- Belaya Gora, Novgorod Oblast, a village in Bronnitskoye Settlement of Novgorodsky District in Novgorod Oblast
- Belaya Gora, Chaykovsky, Perm Krai, a village under the administrative jurisdiction of the town of krai significance of Chaykovsky in Perm Krai
- Belaya Gora, Kungursky District, Perm Krai, a village in Kungursky District of Perm Krai
- Belaya Gora, Pechorsky District, Pskov Oblast, a village in Pechorsky District of Pskov Oblast
- Belaya Gora, Pskovsky District, Pskov Oblast, a village in Pskovsky District of Pskov Oblast
- Belaya Gora, Saratov Oblast, a selo in Bazarno-Karabulaksky District of Saratov Oblast
- Belaya Gora, Republic of Tatarstan, a selo in Chistopolsky District of the Republic of Tatarstan
- Belaya Gora, Tver Oblast, a village in Nelidovskoye Rural Settlement of Nelidovsky District in Tver Oblast
