= Olyokminsk Airport =

- IATA: OLZ; ICAO: UEMO; LID: ОЛК

Summary
- Airport type: Public
- Operator: Airports of the North
- Serves: Olyokminsk, Olyokminsky District, Sakha Republic, Russia
- Coordinates: 60°23′57″N 120°27′51″E
- Website: sever.aero/olekminsk

Maps
- Sakha Republic in Russia

- Location of the airport in the Sakha Republic

Runways
Direction	Length		Surface
Direction	m	ft	Surface
08L/26R	1,900	6,234	Grass
08R/26L	600	1,969	Grass
- Sources: GCM, STV

Olyokminsk Airport (Yakut: Өлүөхүмэ Аэропорт, Ölömbünèèh Aeroporta) (IATA: OLZ, ICAO: UEMO) is an airport serving the urban locality of Olyokminsk, Olyokminsky District, in the Sakha Republic of Russia. Opened in 1942. During the Great Patriotic War, more than eight thousand combat aircraft flying from the United States to the front were delivered through the Olekminsk airfield along the Alsib air route. Currently, the airport provides regular flights to Yakutsk and Irkutsk.

== Airlines and destinations ==
Airlines	Destinations
KrasAvia	Krasnoyarsk-International
Polar Airlines	Yakutsk
Yakutia Airlines	Yakutsk

== See also ==
- List of airports in Russia
