= Srednekolymsk Airport =

- IATA: SEK; ICAO: UESK; LID: СРМ

Summary
- Airport type: Public
- Serves: Srednekolymsk, Srednekolymsky District, Sakha Republic, Russia
- Time zone: MSK+8 (+11)
- Coordinates: 67°28′47″N 153°44′06″E

Maps
- Sakha Republic in Russia

- Location of the airport in the Sakha Republic

Runways
Direction	Length		Surface
Direction	m	ft	Surface
01/19	1,300	4,265	Asphalt
- Sources: GCM, STV

Srednekolymsk Airport (IATA: SEK, ICAO: UESK) is an airport serving the urban locality of Srednekolymsk, Srednekolymsky District, in the Sakha Republic of Russia. The distance to Srednekolymsk town center is 1 km. The runway is almost directed north/south and the approach/take-off is straight over the town if using the south side of the runway.

== Airlines and destinations ==
Airlines	Destinations
Polar Airlines	Yakutsk
Yakutia Airlines	Pevek, Yakutsk

== See also ==
- List of airports in Russia
