= Sakha Avia =

Russian Airline that retired that rebranded as Yakutia Airlines

IATA	ICAO	Call sign
K7	SKH	SAKHAAVIA
- Founded: 1992
- Ceased operations: 2002 rebranded to Yakutia
- Hubs: Yakutsk
- Focus cities: Novosibirsk; Moscow-Sheremetyevo
- Destinations: 42
- Headquarters: Yakutsk, Russia

Sakha Avia was an airline that operated in the Sakha Republic of Russia from 1992 until 2001.

== History ==
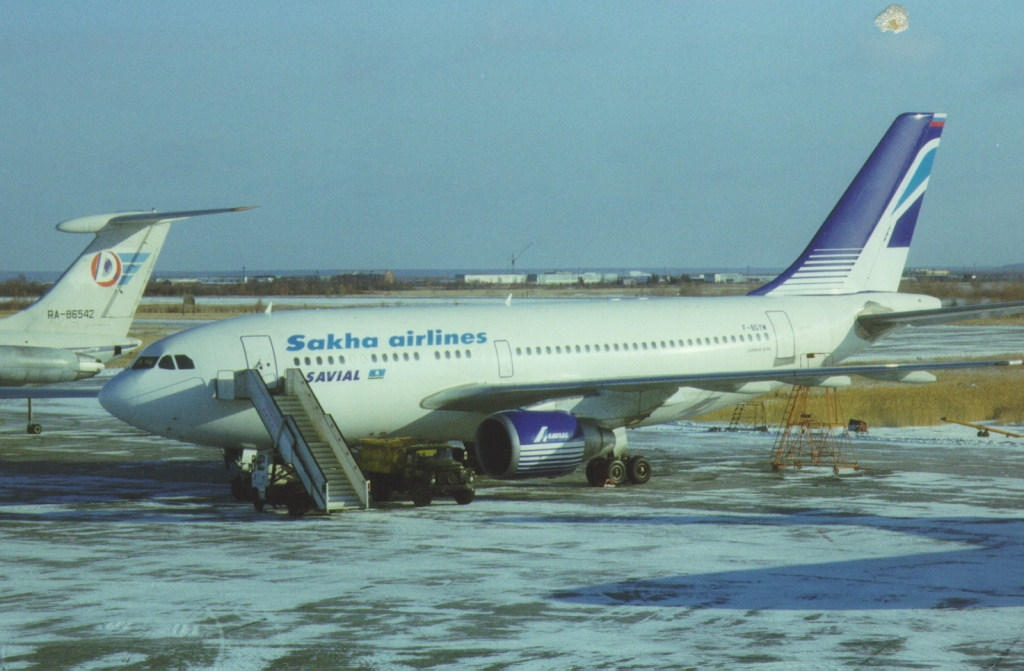
Sakha Avia Airbus A310 parked at Yakutsk Airport.

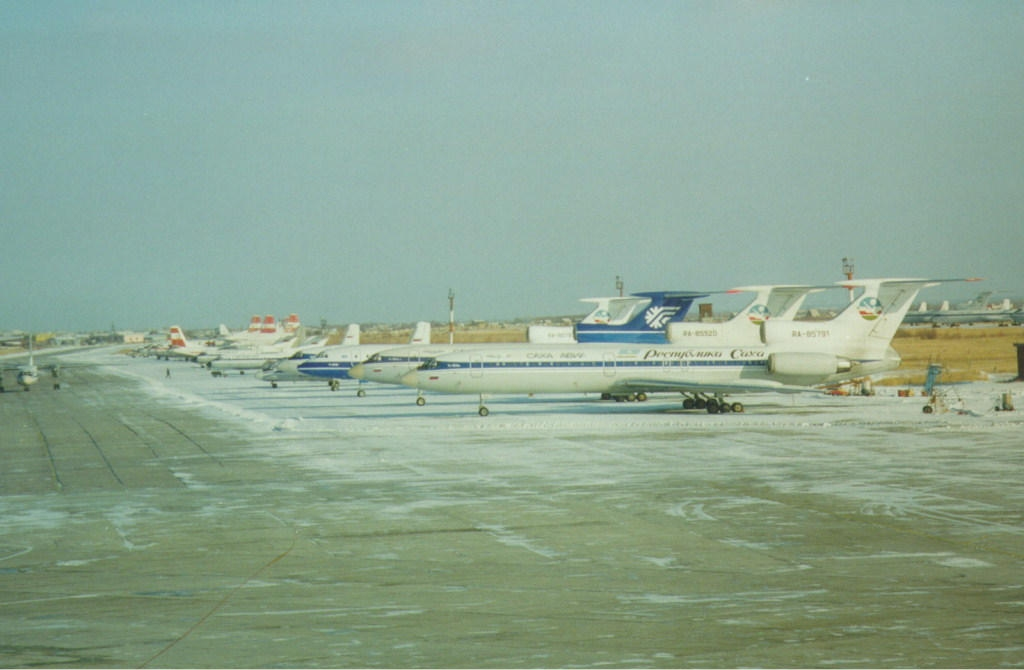
Four Tupolev Tu-154M of Sakha Avia parked at Yakutsk Airport.

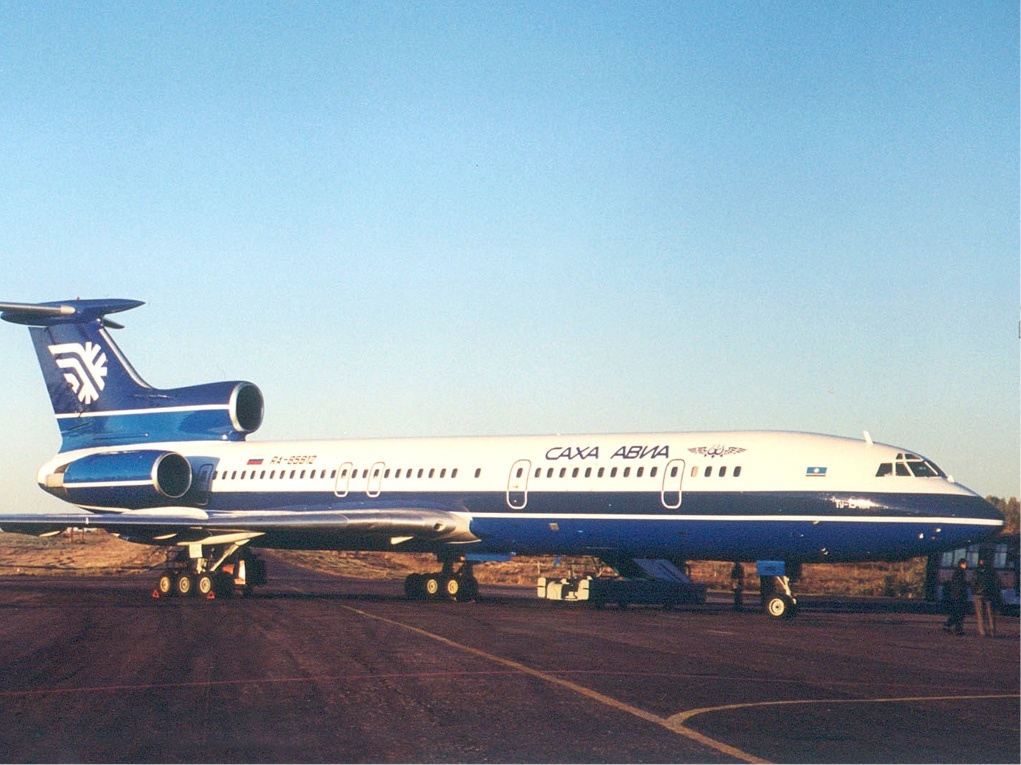
Tupolev Tu-154M of Sakha Avia at Bogashevo Airport.

Sakha Avia was founded in 1992 after the dissolution of the Soviet Union. As Aeroflot was undergoing the upheavals brought about by the dissolution, its operations in Sakha were spun off as Yakutian Air Enterprises, and then later renamed Sakha Airlines.

The airline rebranded to Yakutia in 2002.

== Fleet ==
The airline operated the following aircraft types before it ceased operations:

- Airbus A310
- Antonov An-12
- Antonov An-24
- Ilyushin Il-76M
- Let L-410 Turbolet
- Tupolev Tu-154M
- Yakovlev Yak-40
- A number of helicopters

== Destinations ==
Sakha Avia till 2001 operated a number of routes:

- Barnaul - Barnaul Airport
- Beijing - Beijing Capital International Airport
- Blagoveshchensk - Ignatyevo Airport
- Chita - Kadala Airport
- Irkutsk - International Airport Irkutsk
- Khabarovsk - Khabarovsk Novy Airport
- Krasnoyarsk - Krasnoyarsk Cheremshanka Airport
- Krasnoyarsk - Yemelyanovo Airport
- Moscow - Domodedovo International Airport
- Moscow - Sheremetyevo International Airport
- Novosibirsk - Tolmachevo Airport
- Omsk - Omsk Tsentralny Airport
- Saint Petersburg - Pulkovo Airport
- Tokyo - Narita International Airport
- Tomsk - Bogashevo Airport
- Ulan-Ude - Baikal International Airport
- Vladivostok - Vladivostok International Airport
- Yakutsk - Yakutsk Airportbase
- Yekaterinburg - Koltsovo Airport
- + several routes in Yakutia Republic

== Incidents ==
- 26 August 1993, the Let L-410 Turbolet flying from Kutana to Aldan via Uchur, crashed shortly near Aldan Airport, the aircrash was due to the aircraft overload. All the members of crew and all the passengers died. Following the statistics that was the biggest aircrash as for the aircraft overall and as for the republic Yakutia.
- 13 July 2002, a Sakha Avia An-24RV (RA-46670) landed wheels-up at Yakutsk Airport during a training flight due to crew error; all four crew survived, but the aircraft was written off.
