= Ust-Nera Airport =

- IATA: USR; ICAO: UEMT; LID: УНР

Summary
- Airport type: Public
- Serves: Ust-Nera, Oymyakonsky District, Sakha Republic, Russia
- Coordinates: 64°32′58″N 143°06′39″E

Maps
- Sakha Republic in Russia

- Location of the airport in the Sakha Republic

Runways
Direction	Length		Surface
Direction	m	ft	Surface
07/25	1,100	3,609	Asphalt
- Sources: GCM, STV

Ust-Nera Airport (IATA: USR, ICAO: UEMT) is an airport serving the urban locality of Ust-Nera, Oymyakonsky District, in the Sakha Republic of Russia.

== Airlines and destinations ==
Airlines	Destinations
Yakutia Airlines	Yakutsk

== See also ==
- List of airports in Russia
