= Kuberganya =

Kuberganya Куберганя
- Selo

Other transcription(s)
  - Yakut: Кэбэргэнэ
- Interactive map of Kuberganya
- Location of Kuberganya Kuberganya (Sakha Republic)
- Coordinates: 67°46′11″N 144°29′23″E
- Country: Russia
- Federal subject: Sakha Republic
- Administrative district: Abyysky District
- Rural okrugSelsoviet: Mayorsky National Rural Okrug
- Founded: 1931

Population (2010 Census)
  - Total: 530
  - Estimate (January 2016): 484 (−8.7%)

Administrative status
  - Capital of: Mayorsky National Rural Okrug

Municipal status
  - Municipal district: Abyysky Municipal District
  - Rural settlement: Mayorsky National Rural Settlement
  - Capital of: Mayorsky National Rural Settlement
- Time zone: UTC+11 (MSK+8)
- Postal code: 678892
- OKTMO ID: 98601409101

Kuberganya (Russian: Куберганя; Yakut: Кэбэргэнэ, romanized: Kebergene) is a rural locality (a selo), the only inhabited locality, and the administrative center of Mayorsky National Rural Okrug of Abyysky District in the Sakha Republic, Russia, located 170 kilometers (110 mi) from Belaya Gora, the administrative center of the district. Its population as of the 2010 Census was 530, of whom 273 were male and 257 female, down from 579 recorded during the 2002 Census.
