= Suturuokha =

Suturuokha Сутуруоха Сутуруоха (Yakut)
- Selo
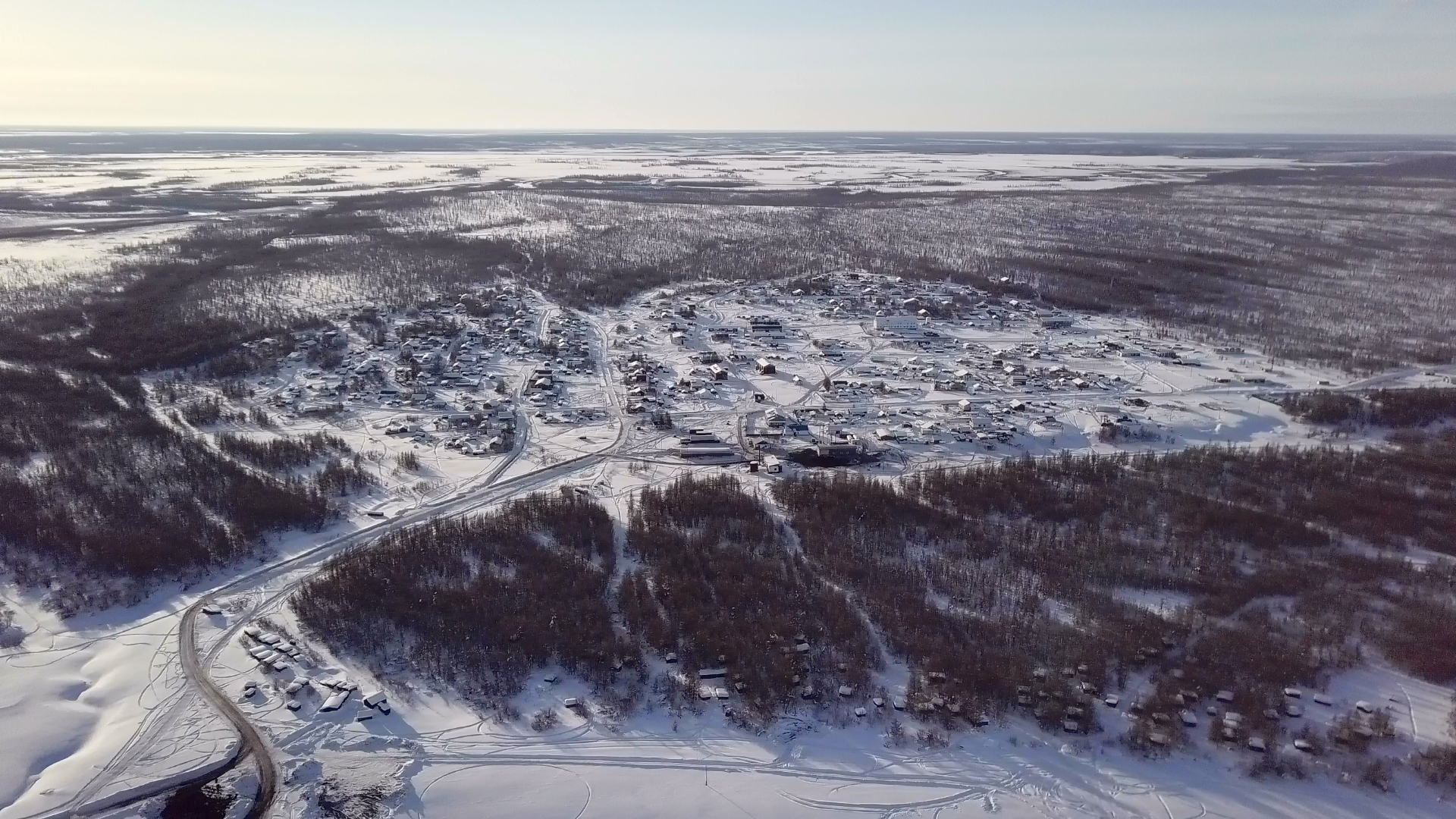
- Interactive map of Suturuokha
- Location of Suturuokha Suturuokha (Sakha Republic)
- Coordinates: 68°33′08″N 146°09′50″E
- Country: Russia
- Federal subject: Sakha Republic
- Administrative district: Abyysky District
- Rural okrugSelsoviet: Urasalakhsky Rural Okrug
- Founded: 1953

Population (2010 Census)
  - Total: 430
  - Estimate (January 2016): 421 (−2.1%)

Administrative status
  - Capital of: Urasalakhsky Rural Okrug

Municipal status
  - Municipal district: Abyysky Municipal District
  - Rural settlement: Urasalakhsky Rural Settlement
  - Capital of: Urasalakhsky Rural Settlement
- Time zone: UTC+11 (MSK+8)
- Postal code: 678895
- OKTMO ID: 98601433101

Suturuokha (Russian: Сутуруоха; Yakut: Сутуруоха, Suturuoxa) is a rural locality (a selo), the only inhabited locality, and the administrative center of Urasalakhsky Rural Okrug of Abyysky District in the Sakha Republic, Russia, located 3 kilometers (1.9 mi) from Belaya Gora, the administrative center of the district, on the opposite bank of the Indigirka river.

== Geography ==
The village is located near the southern slopes of the Polousny Range west of the Indigirka River just above the Arctic Circle. Lake Suturuokha, one of the three largest lakes of the Aby Lowland, lies in the area.

== Demography ==
Suturuokha's population as of the 2010 Census was 430, of whom 224 were male and 206 female, up from 411 recorded during the 2002 Census.

== Climate ==
Climate data for Suturuokha
Month	Jan	Feb	Mar	Apr	May	Jun	Jul	Aug	Sep	Oct	Nov	Dec	Year
Mean daily maximum °C (°F)	−31.3 (−24.3)	−31.8 (−25.2)	−23.2 (−9.8)	−13.8 (7.2)	−1.6 (29.1)	10.4 (50.7)	14.6 (58.3)	11.6 (52.9)	3.7 (38.7)	−8.3 (17.1)	−21.4 (−6.5)	−28.3 (−18.9)	−9.9 (14.1)
Mean daily minimum °C (°F)	−35.1 (−31.2)	−35.8 (−32.4)	−28.9 (−20.0)	−21.1 (−6.0)	−7.6 (18.3)	3.2 (37.8)	7.2 (45.0)	5.0 (41.0)	−0.5 (31.1)	−11.9 (10.6)	−25.1 (−13.2)	−31.8 (−25.2)	−15.2 (4.6)
Average precipitation days (≥ 1mm)	2	1	3	2	2	2	4	2	4	6	4	3	35
Source: http://www.storm247.com/weather/112974069/climate

== See also ==
- Lake Ozhogino
