= Syagannakh =

Syagannakh Сыаганнах Сыаганнаах (Yakut)
- Selo
- Interactive map of Syagannakh
- Location of Syagannakh Syagannakh (Sakha Republic)
- Coordinates: 68°22′N 143°30′E
- Country: Russia
- Federal subject: Sakha Republic
- Administrative district: Abyysky District
- Rural okrugSelsoviet: Mugurdakhsky Rural Okrug

Population (2010 Census)
  - Total: 421
  - Estimate (January 2016): 390 (−7.4%)

Administrative status
  - Capital of: Mugurdakhsky Rural Okrug

Municipal status
  - Municipal district: Abyysky Municipal District
  - Rural settlement: Mugurdakhsky Rural Settlement
  - Capital of: Mugurdakhsky Rural Settlement
- Time zone: UTC+11 (MSK+8)
- Postal code: 678893
- OKTMO ID: 98601417101

Syagannakh (Russian: Сыаганнах; Yakut: Сыаганнаах, Sıagannaax) is a rural locality (a selo), the only inhabited locality, and the administrative center of Mugurdakhsky Rural Okrug of Abyysky District in the Sakha Republic, Russia, located 160 kilometers (99 mi) from Belaya Gora, the administrative center of the district. Its population as of the 2010 Census was 421, down from 447 recorded during the 2002 Census.
