= Deputatsky Airport =

Airport in Deputatsky, Skaha Republic, Russia

- IATA: DPT; ICAO: UEBD; LID: ДЕП

Summary
- Airport type: Public
- Operator: Airports of the North
- Serves: Deputatsky, Ust-Yansky District, Sakha Republic, Russia
- Coordinates: 69°23′33″N 139°54′07″E
- Website: sever.aero/deputy

Maps
- Sakha Republic in Russia

- Location of the airport in the Sakha Republic

Runways
Direction	Length		Surface
Direction	m	ft	Surface
10/28	2,140	7,021	Soil
- Sources: GCM, STV

Deputatsky Airport (Yakut: Депутатский Аэропорт) (IATA: DPT, ICAO: UEBD) is an airport serving the urban locality of Deputatsky, Ust-Yansky District, in the Sakha Republic of Russia.

== Airlines and destinations ==
Airlines	Destinations
Polar Airlines	Yakutsk

== See also ==
- List of airports in Russia
