= Abyy =

Abyy Абый
- Selo

Other transcription(s)
  - Yakut: Абый
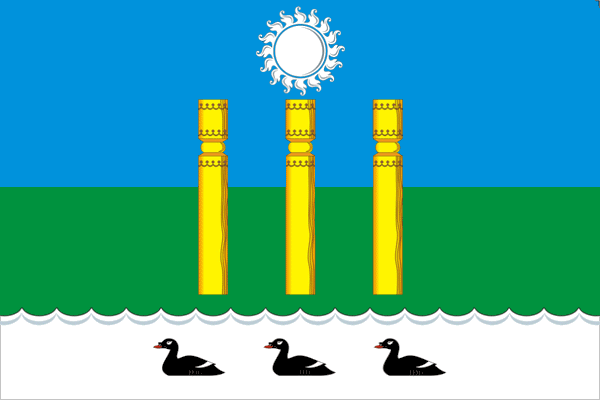
- Flag
- Interactive map of Abyy
- Location of Abyy Abyy (Sakha Republic)
- Coordinates: 68°24′N 145°05′E
- Country: Russia
- Federal subject: Sakha Republic
- Administrative district: Abyysky District
- Rural okrugSelsoviet: Abyysky Rural Okrug
- Founded: 1928

Population (2010 Census)
  - Total: 491
  - Estimate (2021): 483 (−1.6%)

Administrative status
  - Capital of: Abyysky Rural Okrug

Municipal status
  - Municipal district: Abyysky Municipal District
  - Rural settlement: Abyysky Rural Settlement
  - Capital of: Abyysky Rural Settlement
- Time zone: UTC+11 (MSK+8)
- Postal code: 678894
- OKTMO ID: 98601404101

Abyy (Russian: Абый; Yakut: Абый, Abıy) is a rural locality (a selo) and the administrative center of Abyysky Rural Okrug of Abyysky District in the Sakha Republic, Russia, located 80 kilometers (50 mi) from Belaya Gora, the administrative center of the district. Its population as of the 2010 Census was 491; down from 498 recorded in the 2002 Census.
