= Keng-Kyuyol, Abyysky District, Sakha Republic =

Keng-Kyuyol Кенг-Кюёль
- Selo

Other transcription(s)
  - Yakut: Киэҥ Күөл
- Interactive map of Keng-Kyuyol
- Location of Keng-Kyuyol Keng-Kyuyol (Sakha Republic)
- Coordinates: 68°05′N 145°59′E
- Country: Russia
- Federal subject: Sakha Republic
- Administrative district: Abyysky District
- Rural okrugSelsoviet: Uolbutsky Rural Okrug

Population (2010 Census)
  - Total: 255
  - Estimate (January 2016): 209 (−18%)

Administrative status
  - Capital of: Uolbutsky Rural Okrug

Municipal status
  - Municipal district: Abyysky Municipal District
  - Rural settlement: Uolbutsky Rural Settlement
  - Capital of: Uolbutsky Rural Settlement
- Time zone: UTC+11 (MSK+8)
- Postal code: 678881
- OKTMO ID: 98601422101

Keng-Kyuyol (Russian: Кенг-Кюёль; Yakut: Киэҥ Күөл, romanized: Kieŋ Küöl) is a rural locality (a selo), the only inhabited locality, and the administrative center in Uolbutsky Rural Okrug of Abyysky District in the Sakha Republic, Russia, located 80 kilometers (50 mi) from Belaya Gora, the administrative center of the district. Its population as of the 2010 Census was 255, down from 265 recorded during the 2002 Census.
