= Polar Airlines Flight 9949 =

2013 helicopter accident

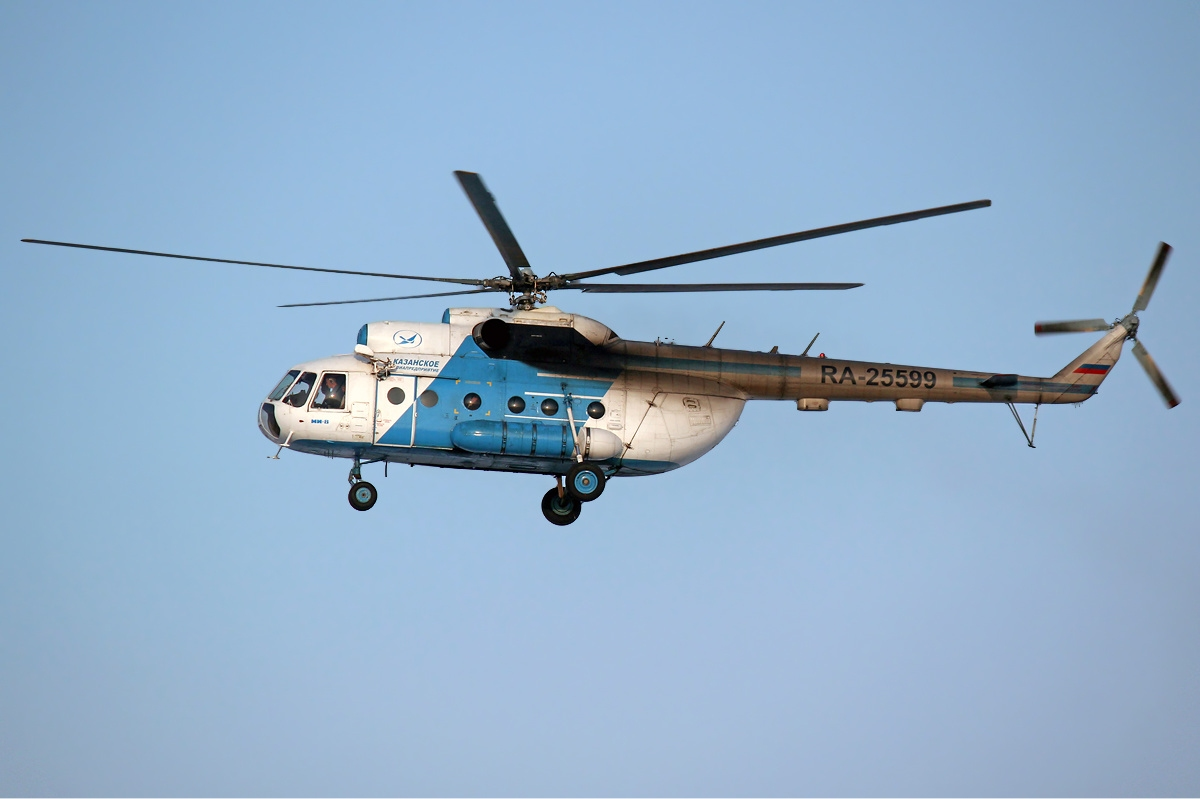
- An Mi-8 similar to the accident aircraft

Accident
- Date: 2 July 2013
- Summary: Controlled Flight into Terrain due to pilot error
- Site: Deputatsky, Sakha Republic, Russia; 69°42′27.8″N 139°26′18″E

Aircraft
- Aircraft type: Mil Mi-8
- Operator: Polar Airlines
- Registration: RA-22657
- Occupants: 28
- Passengers: 25
- Crew: 3
- Fatalities: 24
- Injuries: 4
- Survivors: 4

On 2 July 2013, Polar Airlines Flight 9949, a Mil Mi-8 helicopter operated by Polar Airlines crashed near Deputatsky, an urban locality of Ust-Yansky District in the Sakha Republic, Russia, with 25 passengers (including 11 children) and three crew members on board. According to a Ministry of Emergency Situations spokesman, 24 people died in the crash; the three crew members and a child survived. Early reports suggested that the pilot lost control of the helicopter due to strong winds. The crash was investigated by the Interstate Aviation Committee.

== Accident ==
At 10:00 PM local time, the flight crew underwent a pre-flight medical exam at the local hospital in the village of Deputatsky, with no health concerns noted the crew were cleared to operate the flight, which was scheduled for 11:00 PM local time. The flight mechanic refueled the helicopter with 2800 liters of ice resistant fuel. At 10:30 PM, the pilots received the meteorological forecast for the route, seeing no concerns he signed it off.

At 11:38 PM, the Pilot in Command requested to take-off using Visual flight rules, and to start their engines, they received confirmation for both. At 11:51 PM, flight 9949 received take-off clearance 51 minutes past the scheduled departure time, soon after the flight lifted off making a right hand turn. At 11:58:46 PM, the flight crew reported their status to the dispatch office, this was the last radio communication from flight 9949.

At 12:13 AM, the helicopter crashed into an elevated outcropping, completely destroying the aircraft. At 12:34, the PIC using a satellite phone called to report the crash, and that there were some survivors but many more fatalities. In total all 3 crew members and 1 passenger survived the crash.
