= Suturuokha (lake) =

Lake in the country of Russia

- Сутуруоха
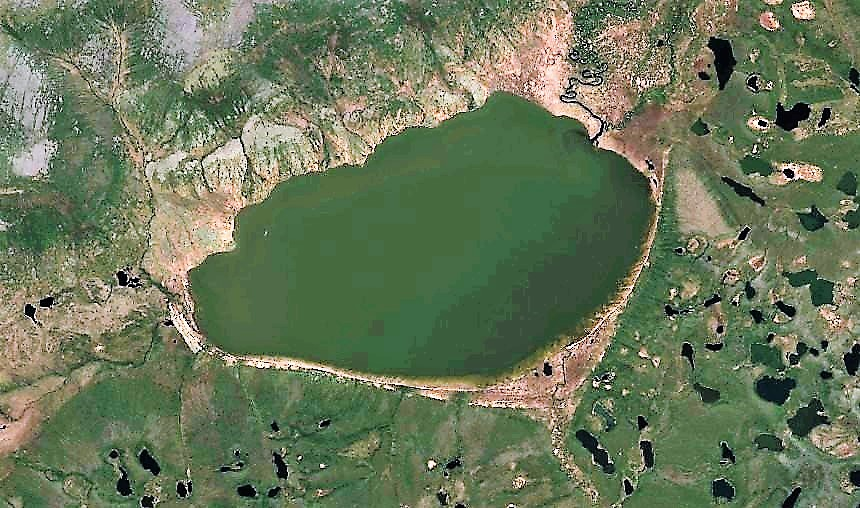
- Sentinel-2 image of the lake in August

- Location in Sakha, Russian Far East
- Location: Aby District, Sakha Republic
- Coordinates: 69.15806°N 145.405°E
- Primary outflows: Suturuokha
- Catchment area: 922 km^{2} (356 sq mi)
- Basin countries: Russia
- Max. length: 24 km (15 mi)
- Surface area: 67.9 km^{2} (26.2 sq mi)
- Average depth: 3.5 m (11 ft)
- Frozen: September - June
- Settlements: Suturuokha

Suturuokha (Russian: Сутуруоха) is a freshwater lake in the Sakha Republic, Russia. It lies in the middle course area of the Indigirka River, to the west of it. Administratively the lake is part of Aby District (Aby Ulus).

== Geography ==
The lake is located in the Aby Lowland —part of the wider East Siberian Lowland, by the southeastern slopes of the Polousny Range, a short distance to the west of Lake Ozhogino. Suturuokha village lies to the southeast of the lake. It is one of the three largest lakes of the 15,000 Aby Lakes. There is an island formed by stones in the central area of the lake which has become a nesting site for birds.

Lake Suturuokha has an average depth of 2 meters (6 ft 7 in) and a maximum depth of 3.5 meters (11 ft). The lake is frozen between late September and June. The Suturuokha River, a right hand tributary of the Indigirka, flows from the southern shore of the lake.

== See also ==
- List of lakes of Russia
