= Nera (Indigirka) =

Nera Нерa / Ньара
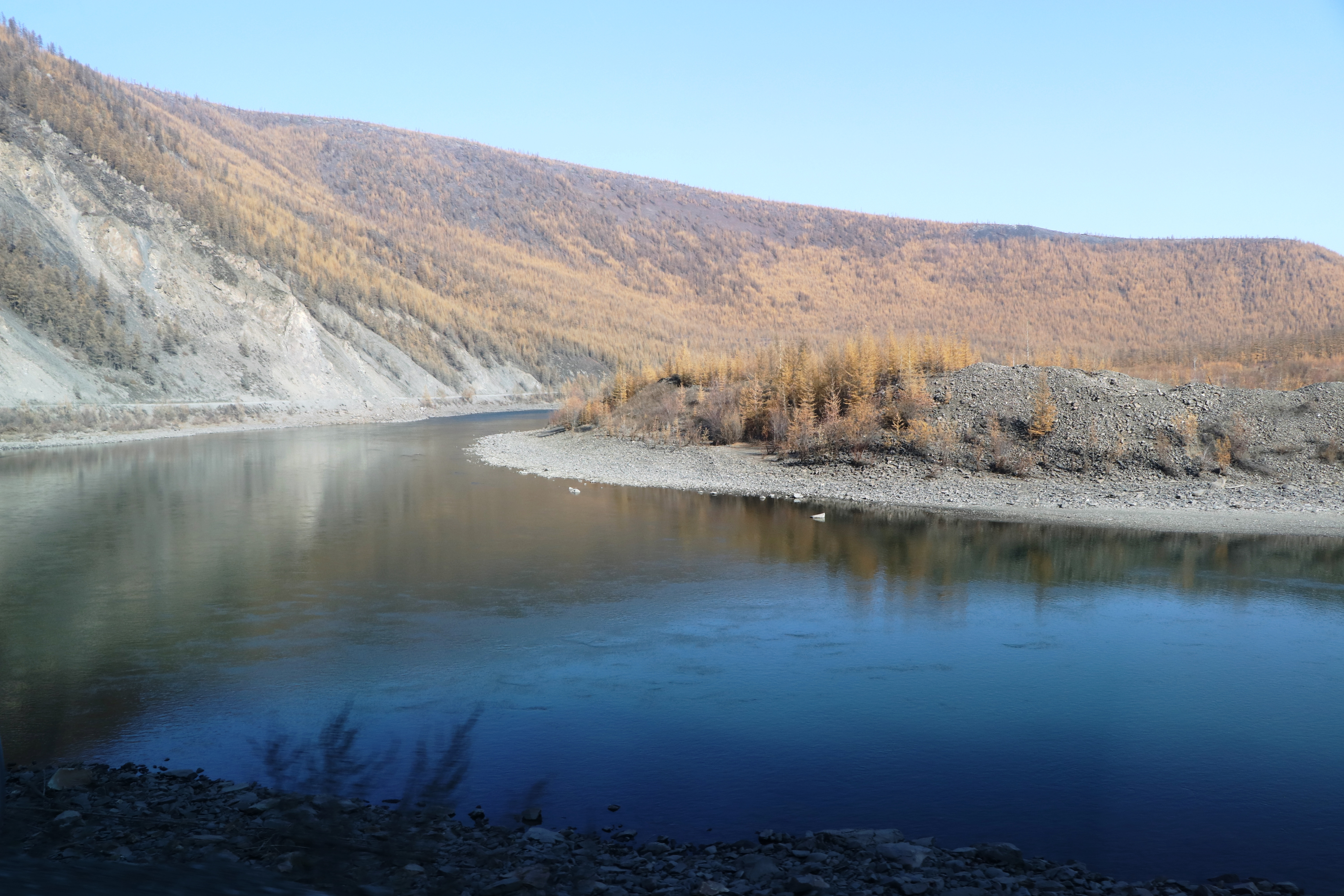

- Mouth location in the Sakha Republic, Russia

Location
- Country: Russia
- Federal Subject: Sakha Republic
- City: Ust-Nera

Physical characteristics
- Source
  - location: Nera Plateau
  - coordinates: 63°48′28″N 145°34′3″E
  - elevation: 787 m (2,582 ft)
- Source confluence: Delyankir and Khudzhakh Rivers
- Mouth: Indigirka
  - location: Ust-Nera, Oymyakon District
  - coordinates: 64°35′55″N 143°15′35″E
  - elevation: 500 m (1,600 ft)
- Length: 331 km (206 mi)
- Basin size: 24,500 km^{2} (9,500 sq mi)

Basin features
- Progression: Indigirka→ East Siberian Sea

The Nera (Russian: Нера, Yakut: Ньара, romanized: Ņara) is a river in the Sakha Republic, Russia, and is a right tributary of the Indigirka. The river is 331 kilometres (206 mi) long and has a drainage basin of 24,500 square kilometres (9,460 sq mi).

The Nera freezes up in October and remains icebound until May - early June. A stretch of the R504 Kolyma Highway runs along the river.

== Course ==
The Nera is formed by the confluence of the rivers Delyankir and Khudzhakh in the Nera Plateau, near the border of Yakutia and Magadan Oblast. It flows roughly northeastwards and reaches its mouth at the Indigirka near the gold mining town of Ust-Nera on the Kolyma Highway.

== See also ==
- List of rivers of Russia
