= Belaya Gora Airport =

Airport in Russia

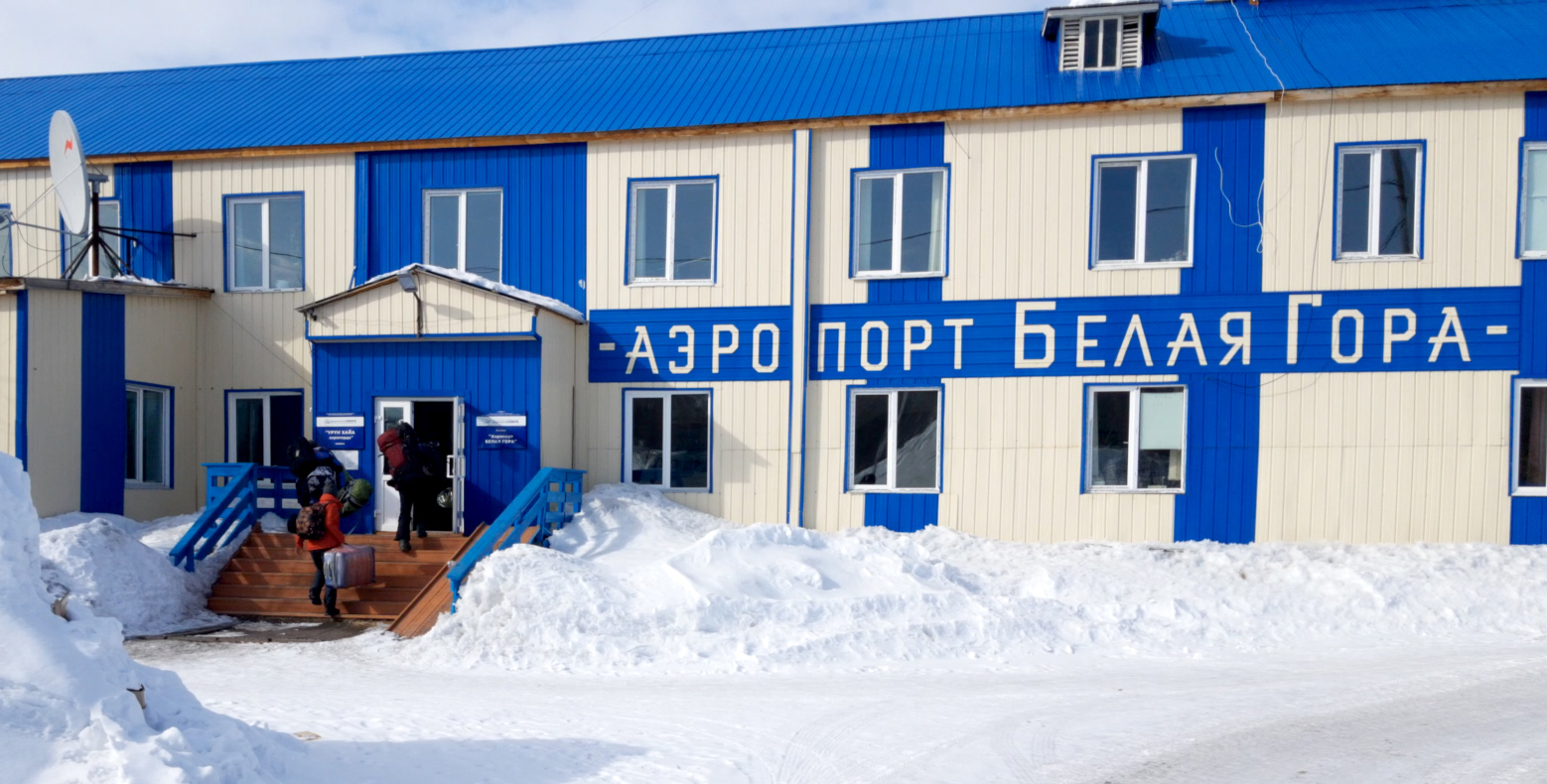
- IATA: BGN; ICAO: UESG; LID: БЯГ

Summary
- Airport type: Public
- Serves: Belaya Gora, Abyysky District, Sakha Republic, Russia
- Elevation AMSL: 25 m / 82 ft
- Coordinates: 68°33′25″N 146°14′05″E

Map
- Location in Yakutia, Russia

Runways
Direction	Length		Surface
Direction	m	ft	Surface
01/19	2,500	8,202	Asphalt
- Sources: Airport Guide, GCM, STV

Belaya Gora Airport (Yakut: Үрүҥ Хайа Aэропорда, Ürüŋ Xaya Aeroporda) (IATA: BGN, ICAO: UESG) is an airport serving the urban locality of Belaya Gora, Abyysky District, in the Sakha Republic of Russia. Provides regular flights to the regional center - Yakutsk, as well as flights within the region. The airport was opened in 1974.

== Airlines and destinations ==
Airlines	Destinations
Polar Airlines	Yakutsk

== See also ==
- List of airports in Russia
