= Belaya Gora (Yemetsky Selsoviet) =

Belaya Gora Белая Гора
- Village
- Location within Arkhangelsk Oblast Location within Russia
- Coordinates: 63°39′N 41°35′E
- Country: Russia
- Region: Arkhangelsk Oblast
- District: Kholmogorsky District

Population
  - Total: 1
- Time zone: UTC+3:00

Belaya Gora (Russian: Белая Гора) is a rural locality (a village) in Kholmogorsky District, Arkhangelsk Oblast, Russia. The population was 1 as of 2012.
