= Chokurdakh Airport =

Airport in Yakutia, Russia

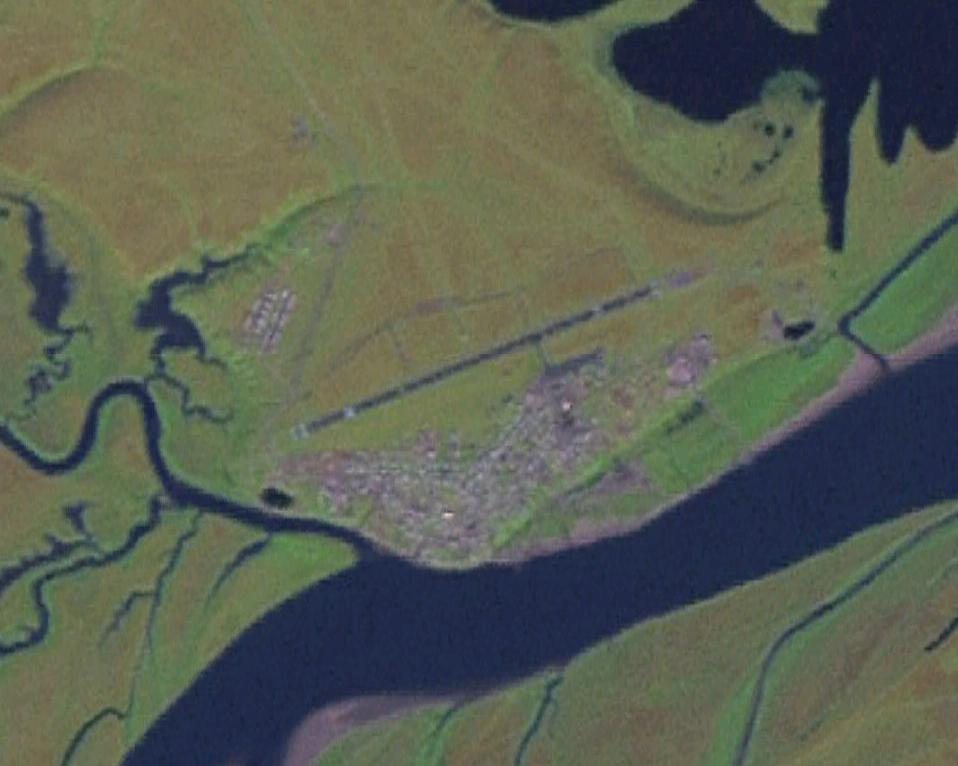
- IATA: CKH; ICAO: UESO; LID: ЧКД

Summary
- Airport type: Public
- Serves: Chokurdakh
- Location: Chokurdakh, Russia
- Elevation AMSL: 151 ft / 46 m
- Coordinates: 70°37′30″N 147°53′48″E

Map
- Location of the airport in the Sakha Republic

Runways
Direction	Length		Surface
Direction	ft	m	Surface
08/26	6,562	2,000	Asphalt

Chokurdakh Airport (sometimes written Chokurdah Airport, Cokurdah Airport) (IATA: CKH, ICAO: UESO) is an airport in Yakutia, Russia located 1 km north of Chokurdakh. It is a major airfield handling small transport aircraft. Google Earth imagery shows a taxiway network on the north side, a feature not common to Russian civilian airports.

== Airlines and destinations ==
Airlines	Destinations
Yakutia Airlines	Yakutsk

== See also ==
- List of airports in Russia
