= Platon Oyunsky Yakutsk International Airport =

Airport in Yakutsk, Russia

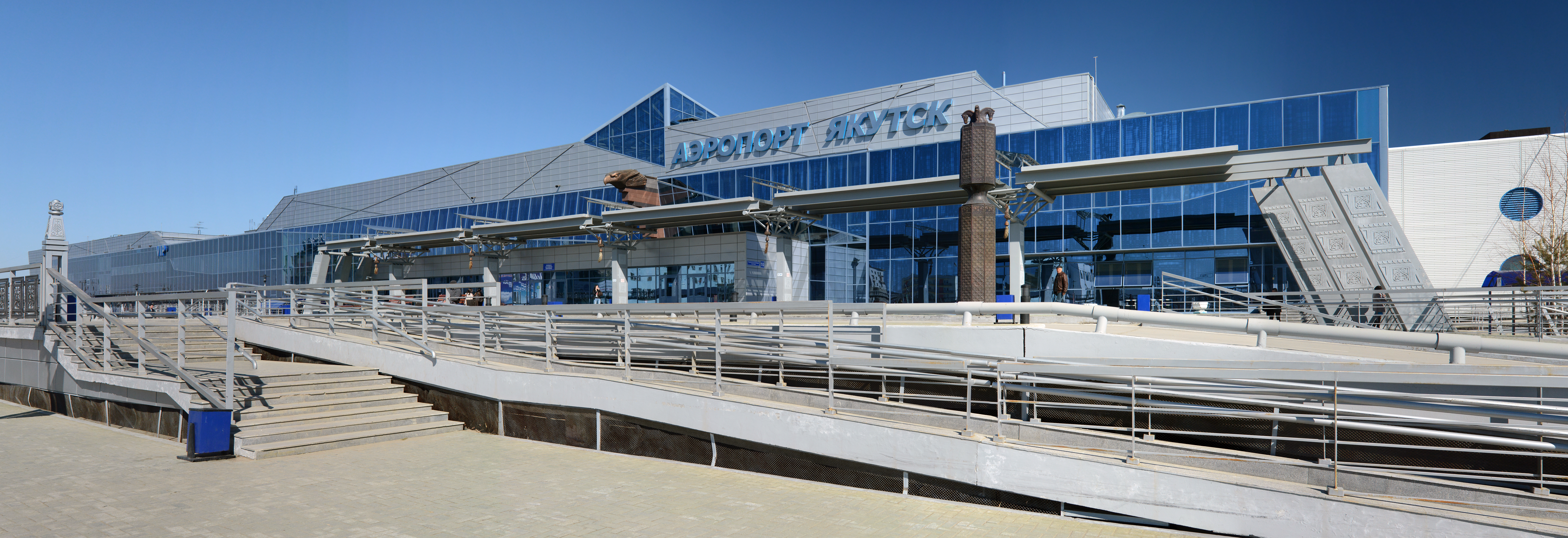
- IATA: YKS; ICAO: UEEE; LID: ЯКТ

Summary
- Airport type: Public
- Operator: Yakutsk Airport State Enterprise
- Serves: Yakutsk
- Location: Yakutsk, Russia
- Hub for: Yakutia Airlines, Polar Airlines
- Elevation AMSL: 99 m (325 ft)
- Coordinates: 62°05′36″N 129°46′14″E
- Website: http://yks.aero/

Map
- Location in the Sakha Republic Location in Russia

Runways
| Direction | Length | | Surface |
| Direction | m | ft | Surface |
|---|---|---|---|
| 05L/23R Closed | 2,500 | 8,202 | Concrete |
| 05/23 | 3,600 | 11,811 | Asphalt |

Statistics (2018)
- Passengers: 908,384
- Sources: Russian Federal Air Transport Agency (see also provisional 2018 statistics)

Platon Oyunsky Yakutsk International Airport (Yakut: Платон Ойуунускай аатынан аан дойдутааҕы Дьокуускай аэропорт, romanized: Platon Oyuunuskay aatınan aan doydutaağı Cokuuskay aeroport, Yakut pronunciation: [d͡ʑoquːsˈqaj aeɾoˈpoɾt]; Russian: Международный аэропорт Якутск имени Платона Ойунского, Mezhdunarodnyj aeroport Yakutsk imeni Platona Ojunskogo) (IATA: YKS, ICAO: UEEE) is an airport in Yakutsk, Russia. It has one runway (an older runway serves as a parking area for disused aircraft) and has a capacity of 700 passengers per hour. The airport is the hub for five regional airlines, including Yakutia Airlines and Polar Airlines.

== History ==
Construction of the airport started in 1931, and it was used as a stopover on the ALSIB Alaska-Siberia air route for American planes flying to Europe during World War II. The present international terminal was built in 1996. The airport serves as a diversion airport on Polar route 4. The airport is named after Platon Oyunsky, a Yakut writer killed during the Great Purge.

As early as 2003 and as recent as 2017, the airport has been used by Boeing for certification and cold weather testing of its aircraft.

== Airlines and destinations ==
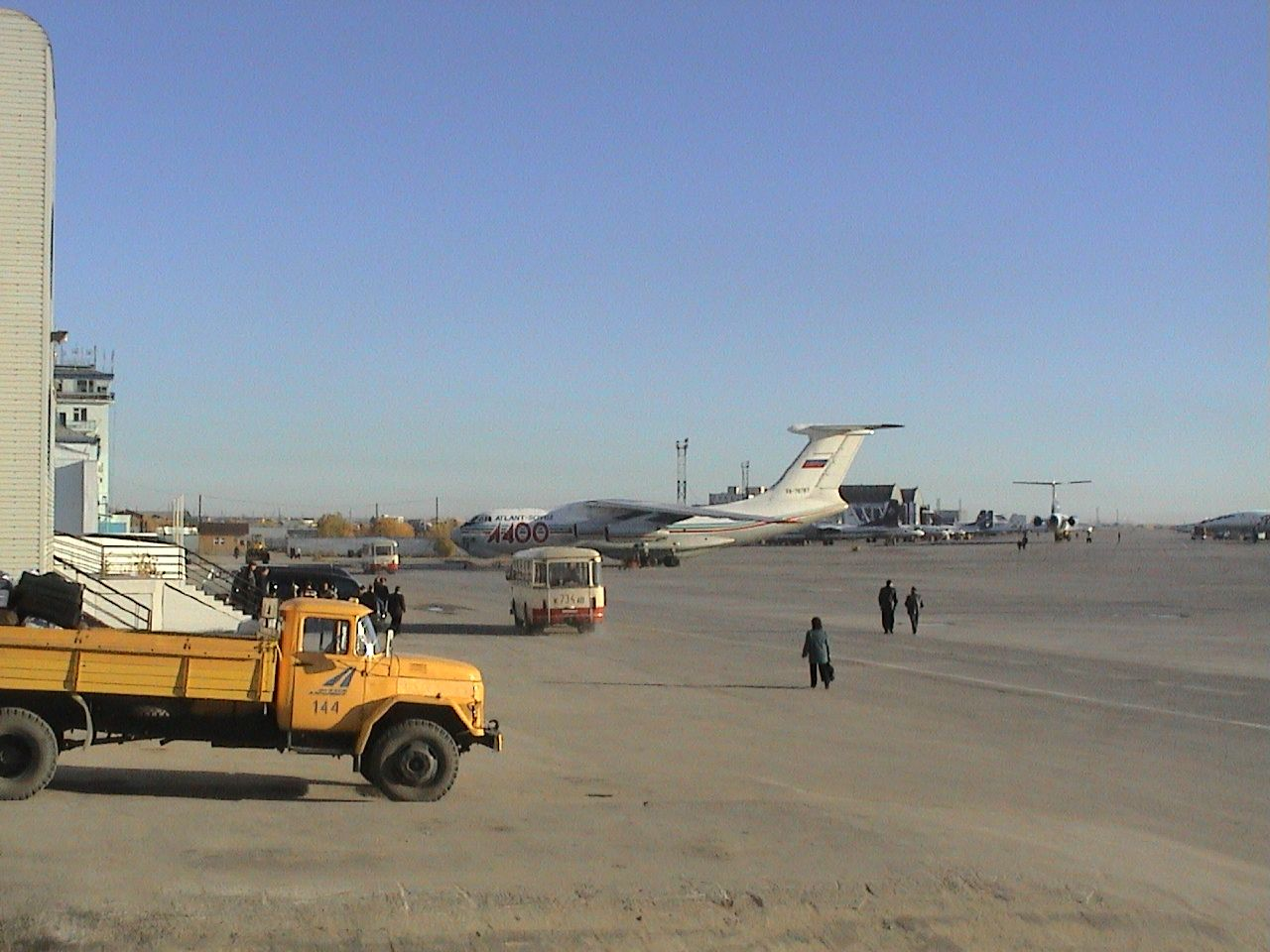
Ilyushin Il-76 parked at Yakutsk Airport.

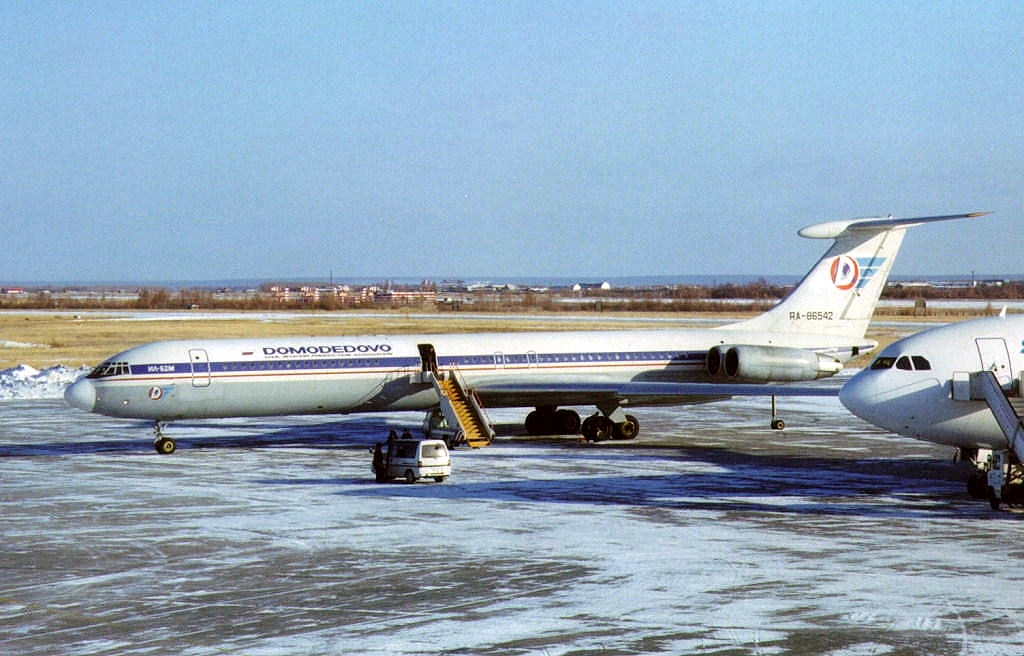
Domodedovo Airlines Ilyushin Il-62M parked at Yakutsk Airport in 1998.

=== Passenger ===
| Airlines | Destinations |
|---|---|
| Aeroflot | Moscow–Sheremetyevo |
| Alrosa Mirny Air Enterprise | Mirny, Molodo, Saskylakh |
| Aurora | Khabarovsk |
| Polar Airlines | Batagay, Belaya Gora, Cherskiy, Chokurdakh, Moma, Nyurba, Olekminsk, Sakkyryr, Saskylakh, Srednekolymsk, Suntar, Tiksi, Ust-Kuyga, Ust-Maya, Verkhnevilyuisk, Vilyuisk, Zhigansk, Zyryanka |
| IrAero | Deputatskiy, Lensk, Olekminsk, Tiksi, Ust-Nera |
| Rossiya Airlines | Krasnoyarsk–International |
| S7 Airlines | Beijing-Daxing, Irkutsk, Khabarovsk, Moscow–Domodedovo, Novosibirsk, Vladivostok |
| Yakutia Airlines | Blagoveschensk, Cherskiy, Deputatskiy, Harbin, Irkutsk, Khabarovsk, Mirny, Moscow–Vnukovo, Nalchik, Neryungri, Novosibirsk, Olekminsk, Olenek, Pevek, Polyarny, Saint Petersburg, Sochi, Tiksi, Ulan-Ude, Vladivostok, Yekaterinburg |

=== Cargo ===
| Airlines | Destinations |
|---|---|
| Yakutia Airlines | Harbin |

== Accidents and incidents ==
Before 1992, Aeroflot had a monopoly on Soviet domestic flights, and had a lot of accidents. At least a dozen deadly accidents happened on or near Yakutsk. See Aeroflot accidents and incidents.

- On 4 February 2010, Yakutia Airlines Flight 425, operated by Antonov An-24 RA-47360 suffered an engine failure on take-off for Olyokminsk Airport. During the subsequent landing, the nose and port main undercarriage were retracted, causing substantial damage to the aircraft.
- On 10 October 2018, Flight 414, operated by a Sukhoi Superjet 100 RA-89011, rode out from a runway on landing at Yakutsk Airport from Ulan-Ude. During the subsequent landing, the behind chassis of the aircraft were broken. No one was killed in the crash, but four people were hospitalised.

== See also ==
- List of airports in Russia
- List of the busiest airports in the former USSR
