= Polar Airlines =

Russian airline

State Unitary Enterprise Airline, Polar Airlines ГУП «Авиакомпания «Полярные авиалинии»
IATA	ICAO	Call sign
PI	RKA	AIR SAKHA
- Founded: 1997; 29 years ago
- Operating bases: Yakutsk Airport
- Fleet size: 2
- Destinations: 20
- Parent company: Government owned
- Headquarters: Yakutsk, Russia
- Key people: Andrei Vasiliyevich Koryakin (General Director)
- Website: https://polar.aero/

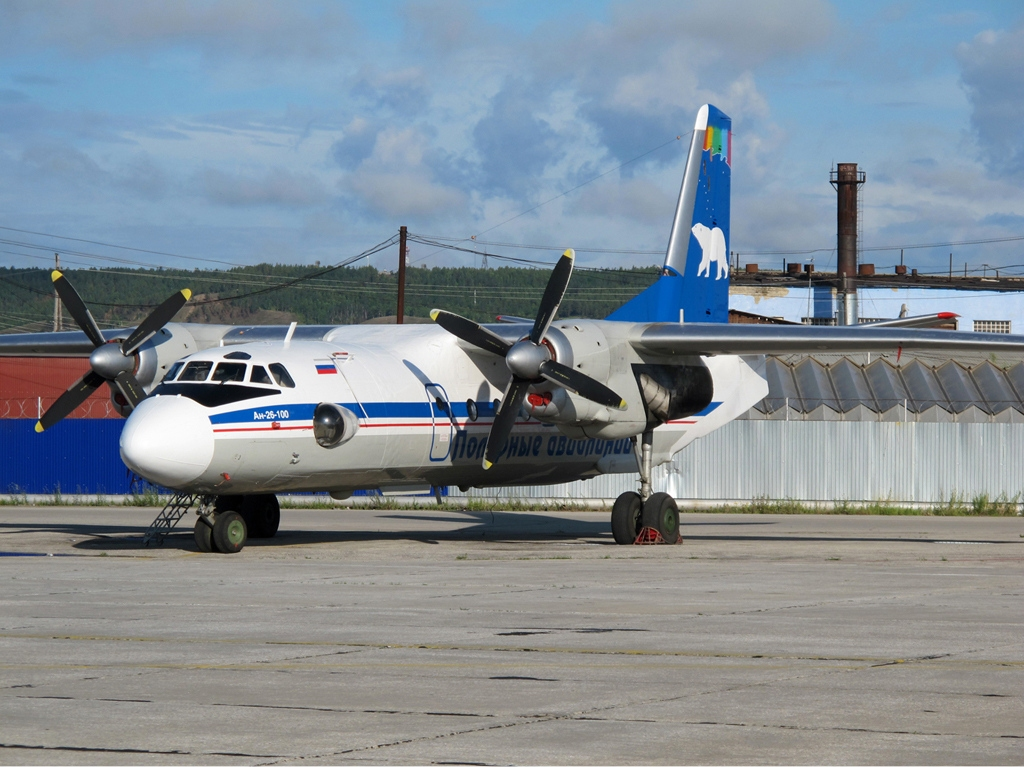
Antonov An-26-100

Polar Airlines (Russian: Полярные авиалинии, Poljarnýe avialinii) is an airline based in Yakutsk, Sakha Republic, Russia. It operates scheduled and charter passenger and cargo services. In 2022, it became part of Russia's single far-eastern airline, along with four other airlines. It is currently banned from flying in the EU.

== History ==
The airline began operations in 1997. It was formed from the Batagai, Kolyma-Indigirka, Chukordakh and Tiksi sub-divisions of Aeroflot.

== Destinations ==
Polar Airlines operates scheduled flights to the following destinations (as of January 2013):

Russia

- Aldan – Aldan Airport
- Bratsk – Bratsk Airport
- Chersky – Chersky Airport
- Chokurdakh – Chokurdakh Airport
- Irkutsk – International Airport Irkutsk
- Lensk – Lensk Airport
- Neryungri – Chulman Airport
- Tiksi – Tiksi Airport
- Yakutsk – Yakutsk Airport
- Zyryanka – Zyryanka Airport
- Batagay - Batagay airport (2026)

== Accidents and incidents ==
- May 16, 2003: Antonov An-3T RA-05881 force-landed 28 mi from Sangara due to engine failure caused by bad weather; all 13 on board survived, but the aircraft was written off.
- November 18, 2005: Antonov An-2TP RA-02252 crashed on a mountain 19 mi from Sangar in bad weather; all 12 on board survived, but the aircraft was written off.
- November 21, 2012: Flight 227 (performed by Antonov An-26 RA-26061) from Yakutsk to Deputatsky overshot the runway on landing by 70 metres. The airline reported an icy runway as the cause. The plane received substantial damage but no injuries were reported.
- July 2, 2013: Flight 9949, a Mil Mi-8 (registration RA-22657) crashed into a hill top 66 km from Deputatsky in the Sakha Republic. 19 of the 25 passengers and 3 crew were killed; of these deaths, several children were involved. 11 of the 25 passengers were children. A post-crash fire consumed the aircraft. This was the only fatal accident for the airline.
- August 16, 2013: Flight 9977, an Antonov An-2TP (registration RA-01419), made a forced landing near Vilyuisk following an unexplained engine problem; all 11 on board survived, but the aircraft was destroyed by a post-crash fire.
- October 11, 2016: Flight 203, an Antonov An-26 RA-26660 landed short of the runway at Belaya Gora Airport. The aircraft was severely damaged. All 33 people on board survived.

== Fleet ==
=== Current fleet ===
As of August 2025, Polar Airlines operates the following aircraft:

Aircraft	In fleet	Notes
De Havilland Canada DHC-8-Q300	2	
Total	2	

As of July 2012 the Polar Airlines fleet included the following aircraft:

Aircraft type	Active	Notes
Antonov An-2	5	
Antonov An-3T	5	
Antonov An-24	6	
Antonov An-26	3	
Let L-410	4	
Mil Mi-8	28	
DA40NG Diamond Star	2	
Pilatus PC-6 Porter	1	
