= Abyysky District =

Abyysky District Абыйский улус (Russian)
- District

Other transcription(s)
  - Yakut: Абый улууһа
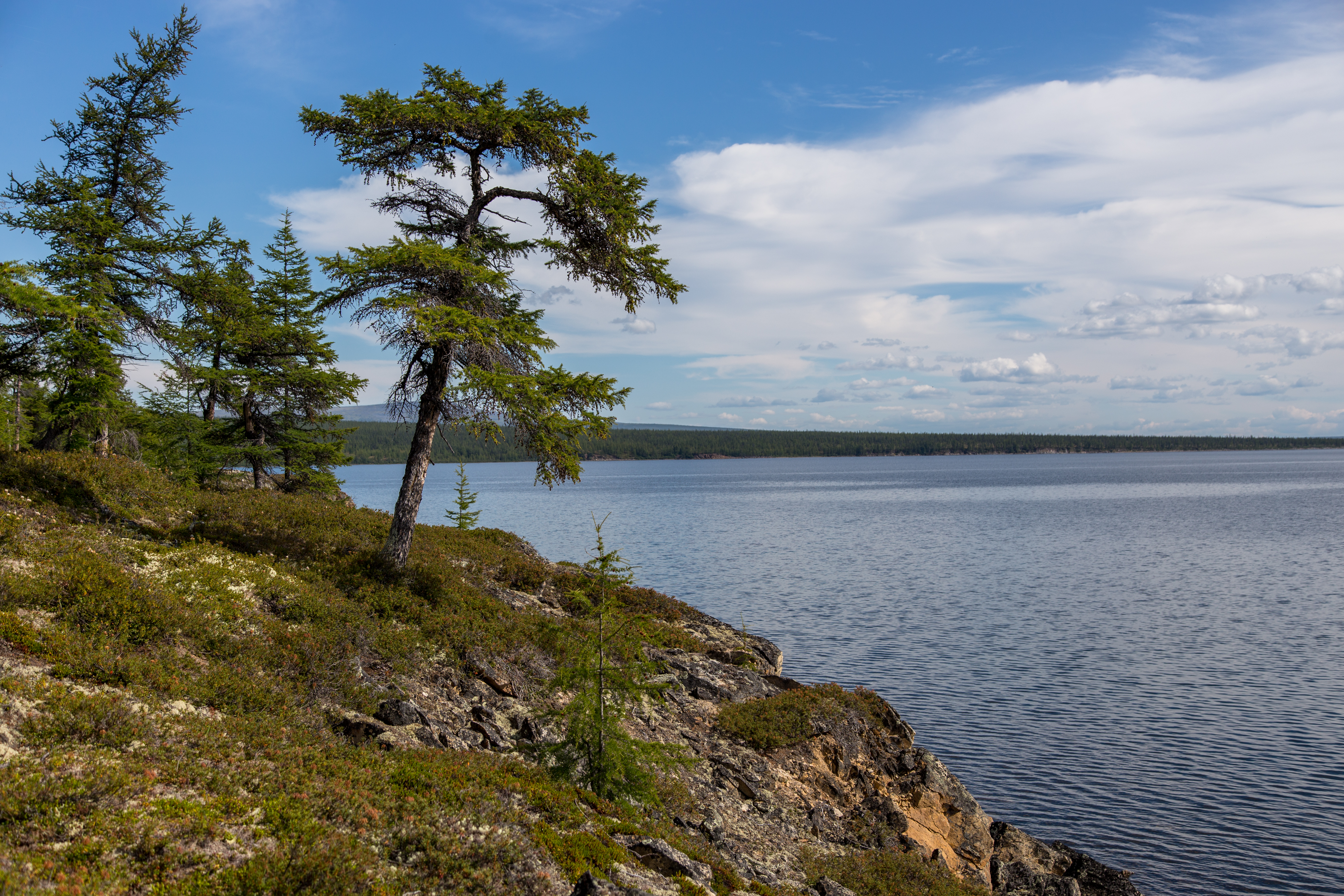
- Lake Ozhogino, Abyysky District

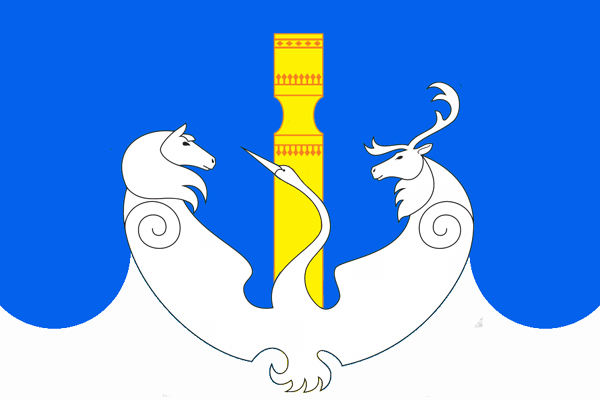
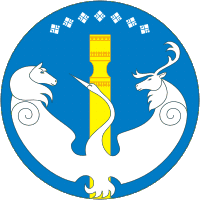
- Flag Coat of arms
- Location of Abyysky District in the Sakha Republic
- Coordinates: 68°33′N 146°14′E
- Country: Russia
- Federal subject: Sakha Republic
- Established: May 25, 1930
- Administrative center: Belaya Gora

Area
  - Total: 69,400 km^{2} (26,800 sq mi)

Population (2010 Census)
  - Total: 4,425
  - Estimate (January 2016): 4,095
  - Density: 0.0638/km^{2} (0.165/sq mi)
  - Urban: 50.7%
  - Rural: 49.3%

Administrative structure
  - Administrative divisions: 1 Settlements, 5 Rural okrugs
  - Inhabited localities: 1 urban-type settlements, 6 rural localities

Municipal structure
  - Municipally incorporated as: Abyysky Municipal District
  - Municipal divisions: 1 urban settlements, 5 rural settlements
- Time zone: UTC+11 (MSK+8)
- OKTMO ID: 98601000
- Website: https://mr-abyjskij.sakha.gov.ru/

Population of Abyysky District
- 2010 Census: 4,425
- 2002 Census: 4,750
- 1989 Census: 6,097
- 1979 Census: 4,803

Abyysky District (Russian: Абы́йский улу́с; Yakut: Абый улууһа, Abıy uluuha, Yakut pronunciation: [abɯj uluːha]) is an administrative and municipal district (raion, or ulus), one of the thirty-four in the Sakha Republic, Russia. It is located in the north of the republic around the Indigirka River and borders with Allaikhovsky District in the north, Srednekolymsky District in the east, Verkhnekolymsky District in the southeast, Momsky District in the south, and with Ust-Yansky District in the west. The area of the district is 69,400 square kilometers (26,800 sq mi). Its administrative center is the urban locality (an urban-type settlement) of Belaya Gora. As of the 2010 Census, the total population of the district was 4,425, with the population of Belaya Gora accounting for 50.7% of that number.

== Geography ==
The Indigirka River and its tributary Uyandina, with the Khatyngnakh, are the main watercourses flowing through the district. The Indigirka is navigable and provides a link to the Kolyma Bay on the East Siberian Sea to the north. The Aby Lowland with up to 15,000 lakes, including Lake Ozhogino, the largest and fifth largest lake in the Sakha Republic, as well as Lake Suturuokha, is located in the district.

=== Climate ===
Average January temperature is −40.7 °C (−41.3 °F) and average July temperature is +14 °C (57 °F). Average annual precipitation is 218 millimeters (8.6 in).

== History ==
The district was established on May 25, 1930. Initially, its administrative center was in the selo of Abyy, but on January 10, 1941 it was moved to Druzhina. On October 4, 1974, it was moved again, this time to Belaya Gora.

== Administrative and municipal status ==
Within the framework of administrative divisions, Abyysky District is one of the thirty-four in the republic. It is divided into one settlement (an administrative division with the administrative center in the urban-type settlement (inhabited locality) of Belaya Gora) and five rural okrugs (naslegs), all of which comprise six rural localities. As a municipal division, the district is incorporated as Abyysky Municipal District. The Settlement of Belaya Gora is incorporated into an urban settlement, and the five rural okrugs are incorporated into five rural settlements within the municipal district. The urban-type settlement of Belaya Gora serves as the administrative center of both the administrative and municipal district.

=== Inhabited localities ===
Administrative/municipal composition
Settlements/Urban settlements	Population	Inhabited localities in jurisdiction
Belaya Gora (Белая Гора)	2,245	**urban-type settlement of Belaya Gora** (administrative center of the district)
Rural okrugs/Rural settlements	Population	Rural localities in jurisdiction*
Abyysky (Абыйский)	544	**selo of Abyy**; selo of Dyosku
Mayorsky (Майорский)	530	**selo of Kuberganya**
Mugurdakhsky (Мугурдахский)	421	**selo of Syagannakh**
Uolbutsky (Уолбутский)	255	**selo of Keng-Kyuyol**
Urasalakhsky (Урасалахский)	430	**selo of Suturuokha**

*Administrative centers are shown in bold

== Demographics ==
As of the 2021 Census, the ethnic composition was as follows:

- Yakuts: 81.3%
- Evens: 9.5%
- Russians: 6.6%
- Evenks: 0.7%
- Buryats: 0.4%
- others: 1.5%
