= Yakutia Airlines =

Russian airline

JSC "Aircompany "Yakutia" АО «Авиакомпания „Якутия“»

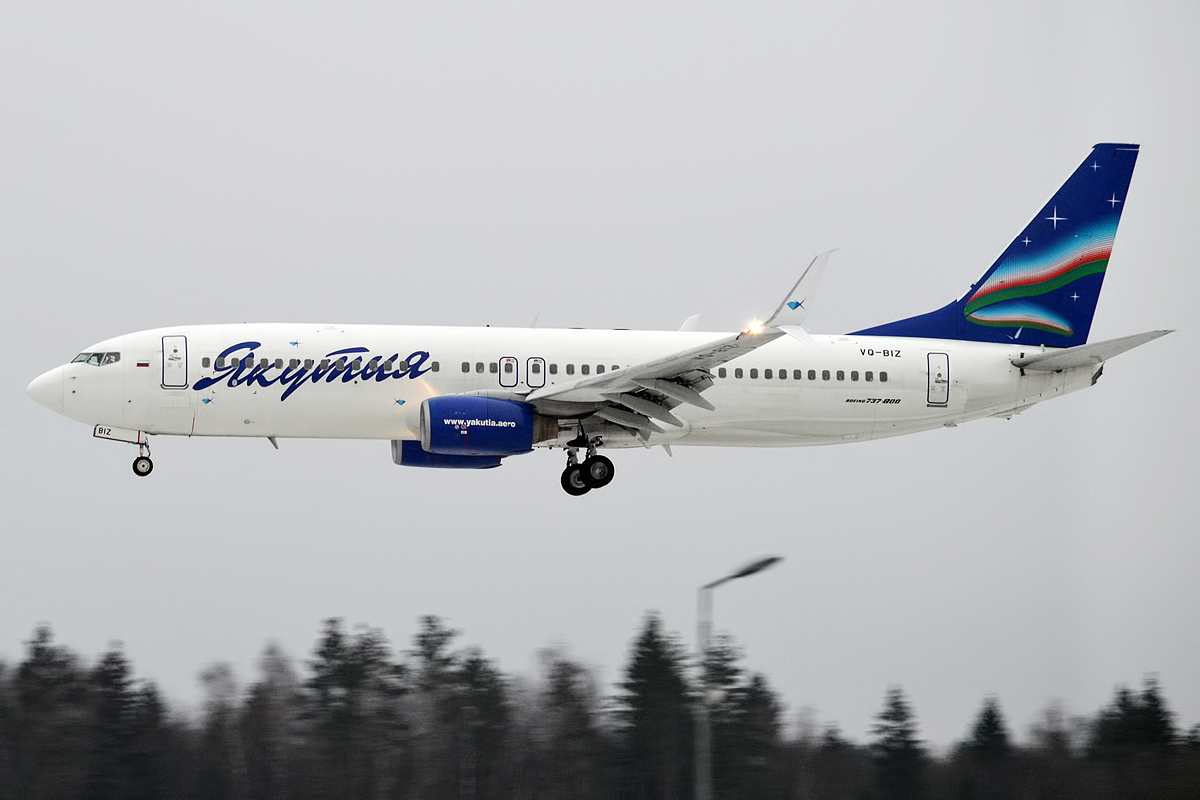
- Yakutia Airlines Boeing 737-800
IATA	ICAO	Call sign
R3	SYL	AIR YAKUTIA
- Founded: 2002; 24 years ago
- Hubs: Yakutsk Airport; Sokol Airport, Magadan
- Secondary hubs: Khabarovsk Novy Airport; Vnukovo International Airport
- Focus cities: Chulman Airport; Irkutsk International Airport; Khabarovsk Novy Airport; Sokol Airport; Tolmachevo Airport; Vladivostok International Airport
- Fleet size: 10
- Destinations: 50
- Headquarters: Yakutsk, Russia
- Key people: Vladimir Gorbunov (General Director, CEO)
- Website: yakutia.aero

Air Company Yakutia (Russian: Авиакомпания «Якутия» – Aviakompanija «Yakutiya») is an airline based in Yakutsk, Sakha Republic, Russia. It operates domestic passenger services in Russia and within the Commonwealth of Independent States as well as destinations in Europe, Asia and North America from its hubs at Yakutsk Airport and Moscow's Vnukovo Airport. The airline was founded in 2002 and is owned by the government of the Republic of Sakha. In 2020, it became part of Russia's single far-eastern airline, along with four other airlines.

As of February 2026, it is on the list of airlines banned in the European Union.

== History ==
The airline was founded as Sakha Avia, the former Aeroflot Yakutsk Division and also previously known as Yakutaviatrans. It operated cargo charters to Africa, Asia, Europe and the Middle East until it filed for bankruptcy in early 1999. It emerged in 2000 and is controlled by the regional government, Neryungri State Air Enterprise. It merged with Yakutavia in 2002 and changed its name to form Yakutia Air Company.

== Destinations ==
In March 2015, Yakutia Airlines operated more than 55 flights. As of November 2023, the airline serves two countries on 50 routes.

== Fleet ==
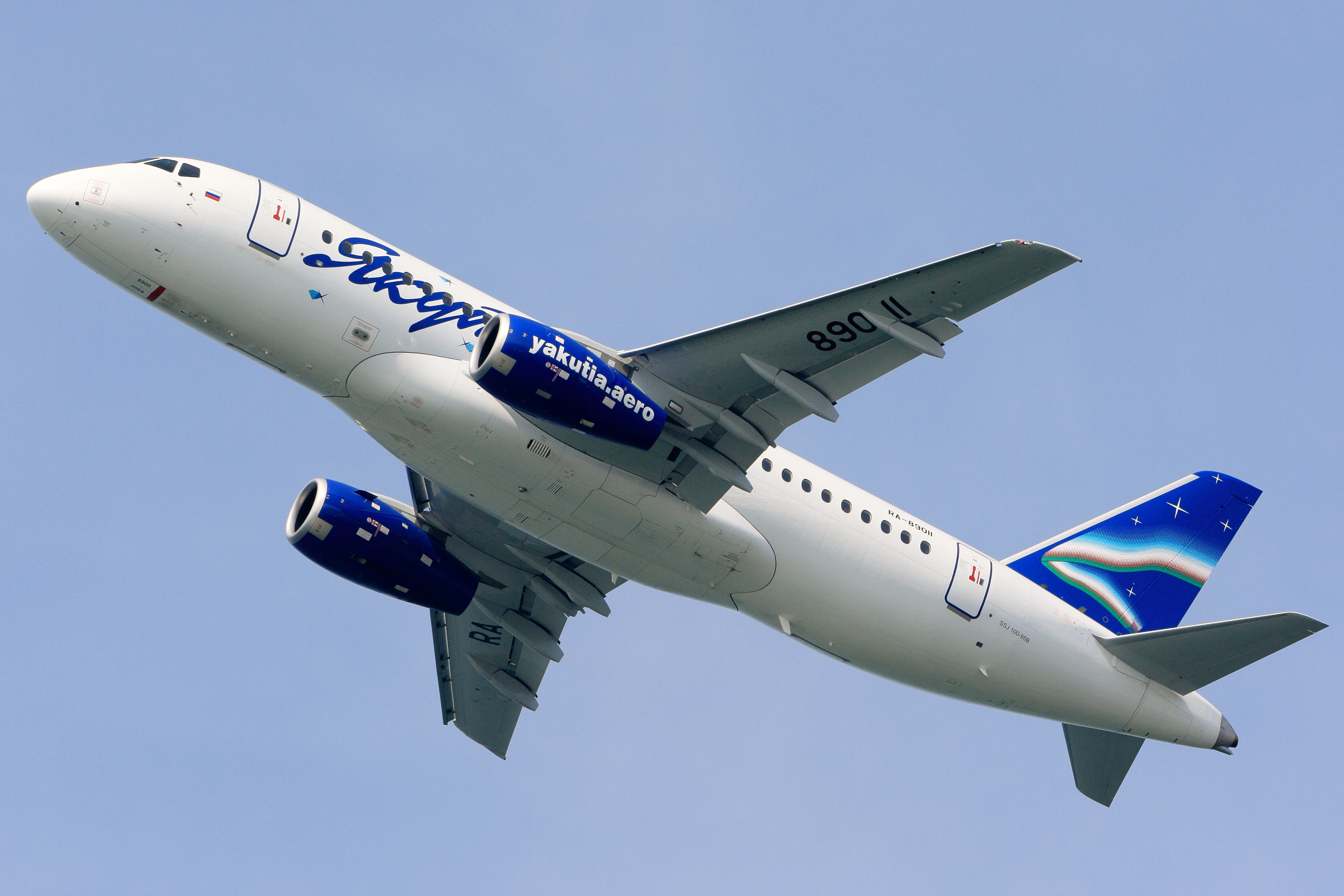
Yakutia Sukhoi Superjet 100-95B

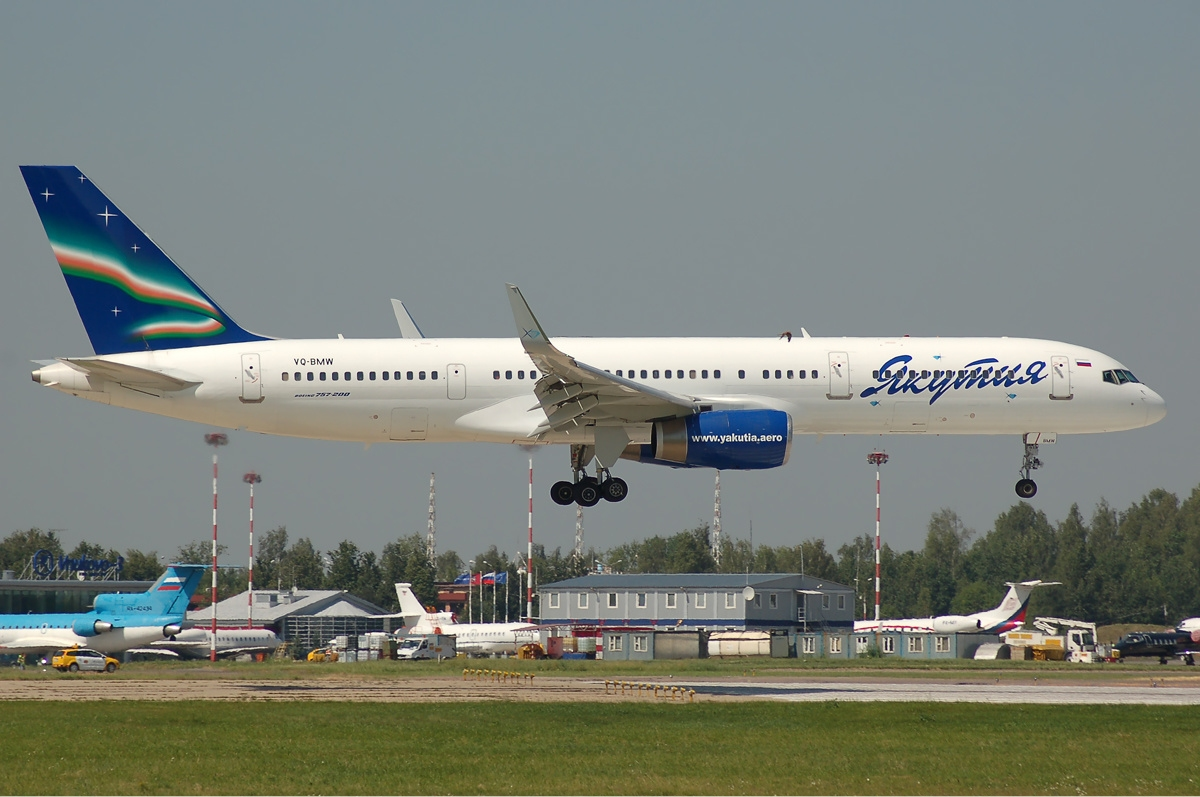
A former Yakutia Boeing 757-200

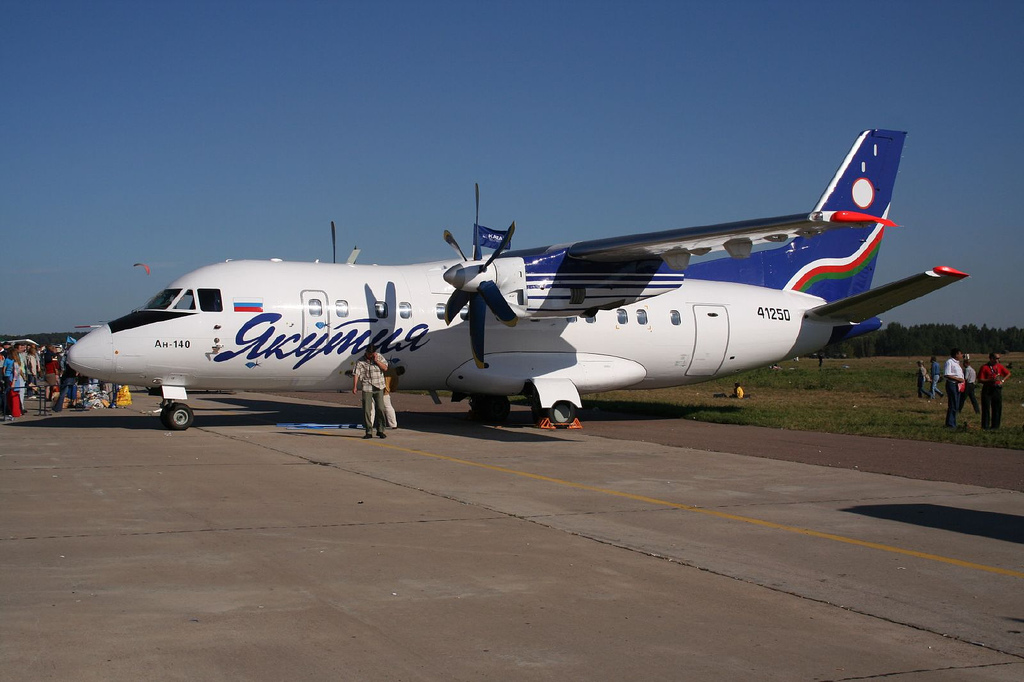
A former Yakutia Antonov An-140-100 at MAKS-2005

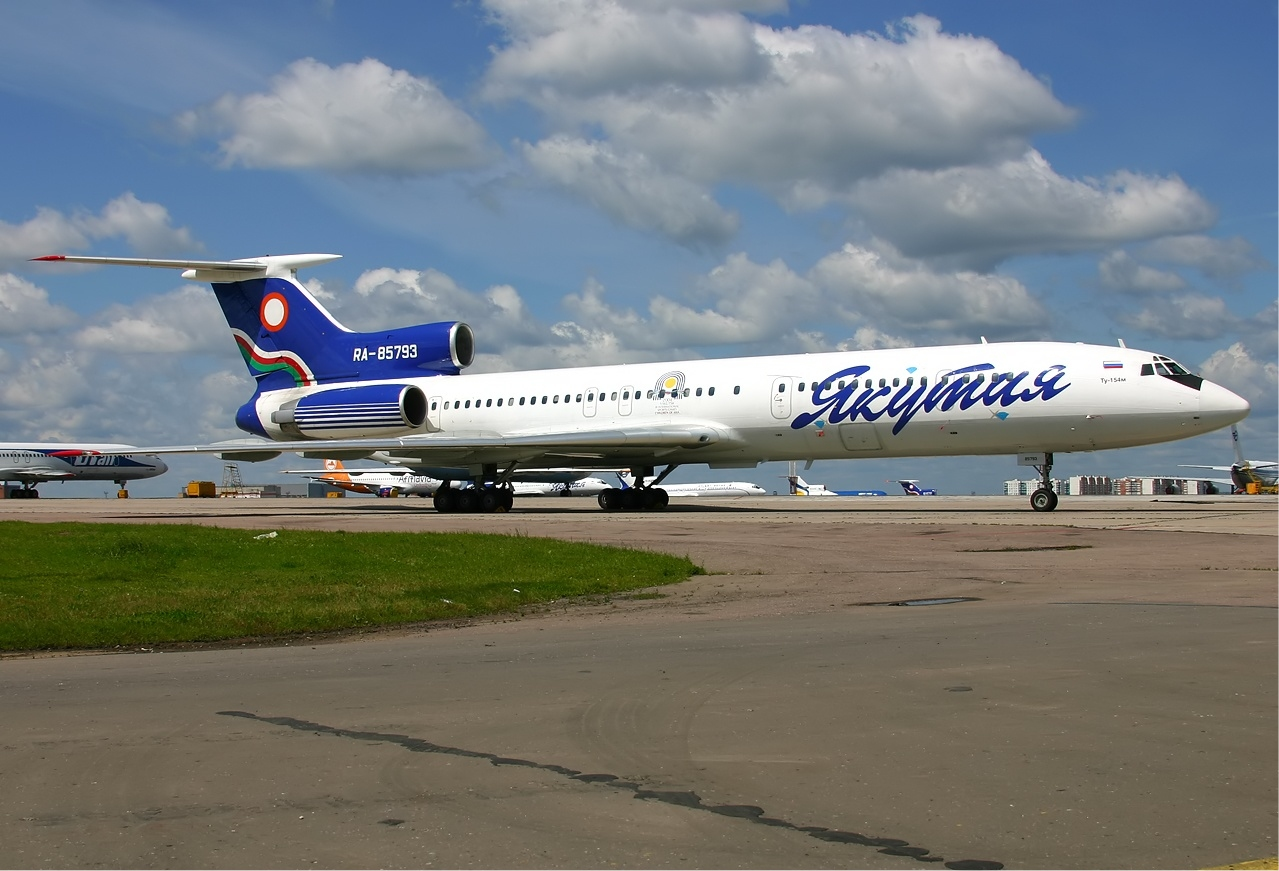
A former Yakutia Tupolev Tu-154M

=== Current fleet ===
As of August 2025, Yakutia Airlines operates the following aircraft:

Yakutia Airlines fleet
Aircraft	In Service	Orders	Passengers			Notes
Aircraft	In Service	Orders	J	Y	Total	Notes
Boeing 737-700	2	—	—	148	148	
Boeing 737-800	2	—	4	162	166	
Boeing 737-800	2	—	8	168	176	
De Havilland Canada DHC-8-300	3	—	—			
Sukhoi Superjet 100-95LR	3	10	—	103	103	
Yakovlev MC-21-300	—	5	TBA			
Total	10	15				

=== Fleet development ===
At the 2019 MAKS Air Show at Zhukovsky International Airport, Moscow, Yakutia Airlines signed a tentative agreement for 5 Irkut MC-21 aircraft. Delivery of the new aircraft was originally expected to be in the second half of 2021.

=== Former fleet ===
Aircraft	Fleet	Year introduced	Year retired	Notes
Antonov An-24	6	Unknown	Unknown	
Antonov An-26	Unknown	2002	2012	Cargo aircraft.
Antonov An-140-100	4	2010	2015	All aircraft are currently stored.
Boeing 757-200	5	2007	2015	
Boeing 757-200APF	2	2011	2018	
Bombardier Dash 8 Q300	4	Unknown	Unknown	
Bombardier Dash 8 Q400	3	Unknown	Unknown	
Tupolev Tu-154M	Unknown	2002	2014	

== Accidents and incidents ==
- On 4 February 2010, Flight 425, operated by an Antonov An-24 RA-47360 suffered an engine failure on take-off from Yakutsk Airport for Olyokminsk Airport. During the subsequent landing, the nose and port main undercarriage were retracted, causing substantial damage to the aircraft. No one was hurt or killed in the crash and the aircraft was subsequently repaired and placed back into service.
- On 10 October 2018, Flight 414, operated by a Sukhoi Superjet 100 RA-89011 ran off the runway on landing at Yakutsk Airport from Ulan-Ude. During the event, the main landing gear of the aircraft collapsed. Four people were hospitalized. The aircraft was damaged beyond repair.
