= Lake Ozhogino =

Lake in Russia

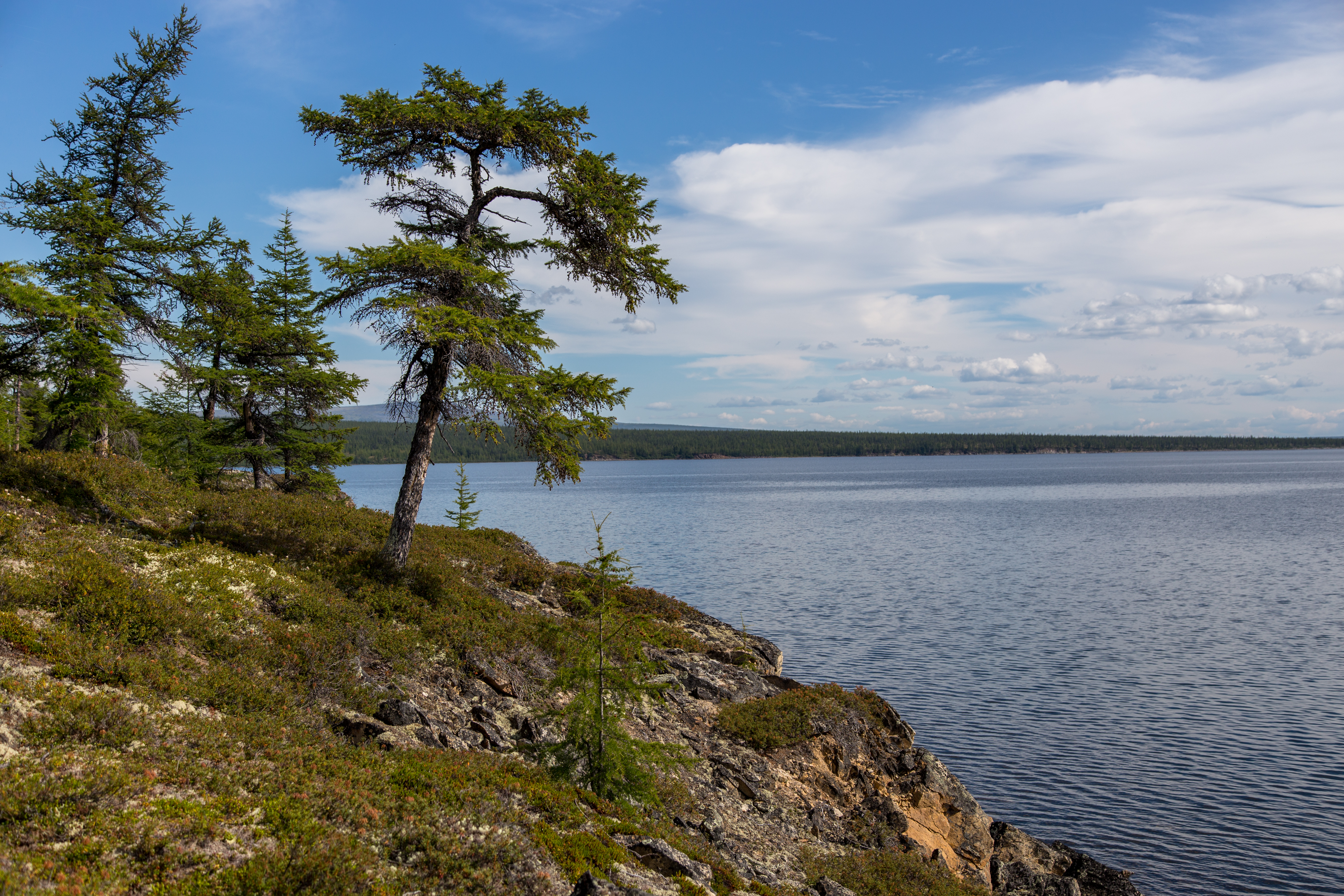

- Location within Russia Location within Sakha Republic
- Location: Sakha
- Coordinates: 69.266667°N 146.6°E
- Primary outflows: Ozhogin River
- Basin countries: Russia
- Surface area: 157 km^{2} (61 sq mi)
- Frozen: September - June

Lake Ozhogino (Russian: Ожогино озеро; Yakut: Одьуогун Күөл, romanized: Ocuogun Küöl) is a large shallow freshwater lake in Sakha, Russia. It has an area of 157 km². It freezes up in late September and stays icebound until June. Ozhogin River (a tributary of the Indigirka River) flows from the lake.

== Geography ==
The lake is located in the Aby Lowland —part of the East Siberian Lowland, by the southeastern slopes of the Polousny Range. It is the largest of the 15,000 Aby Lakes. Lake Suturuokha lies a short distance to the west.
