= Belaya Gora, Sakha Republic =

Belaya Gora Белая Гора
- Urban-type settlement

Other transcription(s)
  - Yakut: Үрүҥ хайа
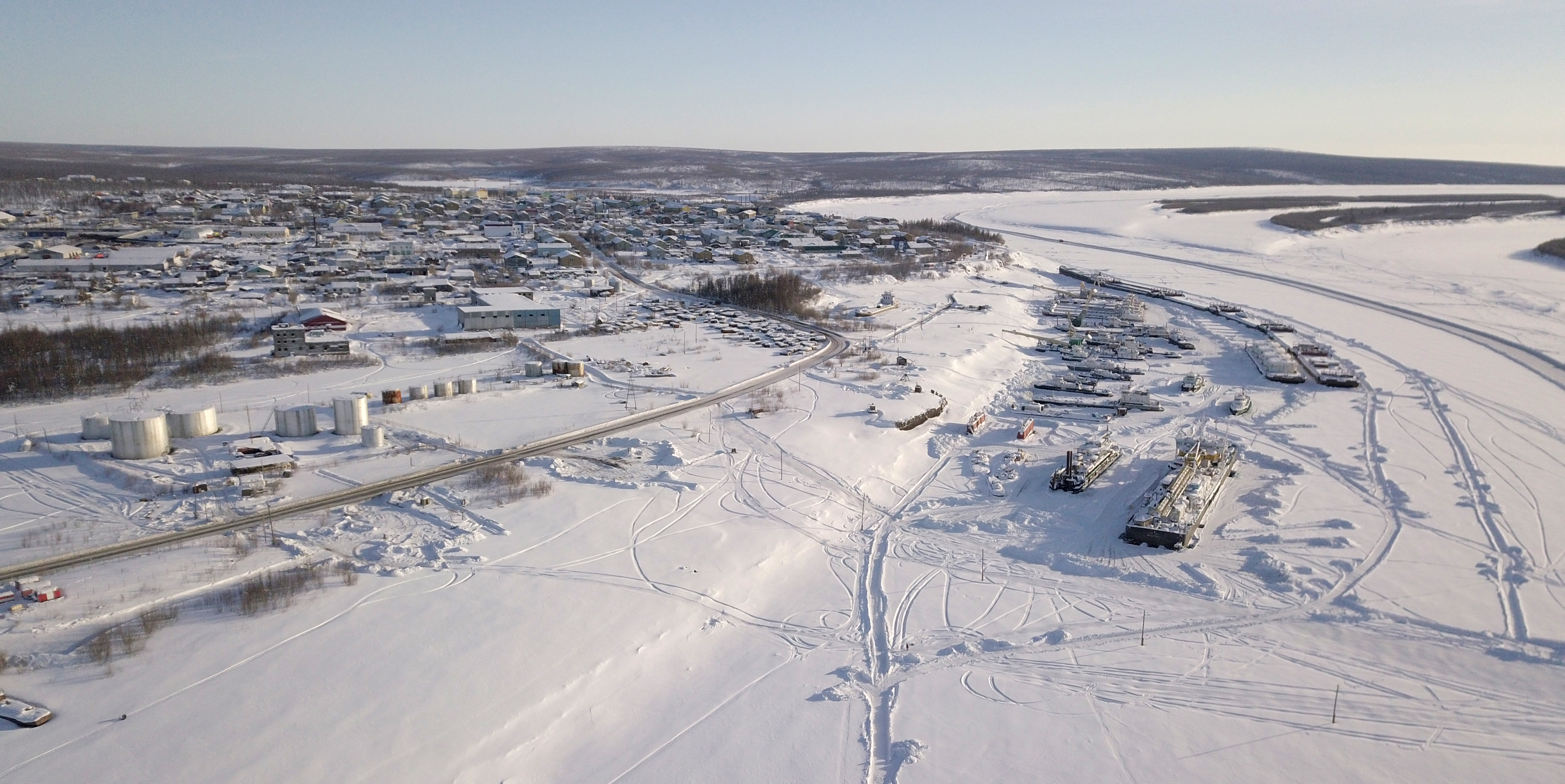
- The village of Belaya Gora in the Abyysky District of Yakutia
- Interactive map of Belaya Gora
- Location of Belaya Gora Belaya Gora (Sakha Republic)
- Coordinates: 68°33′N 146°11′E
- Country: Russia
- Federal subject: Sakha Republic
- Administrative district: Abyysky District
- SettlementSelsoviet: Settlement of Belaya Gora
- Founded: 1974
- Urban-type settlement status since: 1975
- Elevation: 45 m (148 ft)

Population (2010 Census)
  - Total: 2,245
  - Estimate (January 2016): 2,081 (−7.3%)

Administrative status
  - Capital of: Abyysky District, Settlement of Belaya Gora

Municipal status
  - Municipal district: Abyysky Municipal District
  - Urban settlement: Belaya Gora Urban Settlement
  - Capital of: Abyysky Municipal District, Belaya Gora Urban Settlement
- Time zone: UTC+11 (MSK+8)
- Postal code: 678890
- OKTMO ID: 98601151051

Belaya Gora population
- 2010 Census: 2,245
- 2002 Census: 2,463
- 1989 Census: 3,517
- 1979 Census: 1,955

Belaya Gora (Russian: Бе́лая Гора́; Yakut: Үрүҥ Хайа, Ürüŋ Xaya) is an urban locality (an urban-type settlement) and the administrative center of Abyysky District in the Sakha Republic, Russia, located on the right bank of the Indigirka River, approximately 20 kilometers (12 mi) downstream of its confluence with its tributary the Uyandina, opposite the village of Suturuokha. At the 2010 Census, its population was 2,245.

== Etymology ==
The literal meaning of both the Russian and Sakha language names is the "white mountain".

== History ==
It was founded in 1974 as the administrative center of Abyysky District, to replace the previous settlement of Druzhina, which was located 50 kilometers (31 mi) upstream on the Indigirka and was often subject to flooding. It was granted urban-type settlement status in 1975.

== Administrative and municipal status ==
Within the framework of administrative divisions, Belaya Gora serves as the administrative center of Abyysky District. As an administrative division, the urban-type settlement of Belaya Gora is incorporated within Abyysky District as the Settlement of Belaya Gora. As a municipal division, the Settlement of Belaya Gora is incorporated within Abyysky Municipal District as Belaya Gora Urban Settlement.

== Transportation ==
Belaya Gora is not connected to the outside world by any year-round roads. A winter road following the Indigirka, partially on the ice of the river when frozen, passes through, allowing for travel downstream to Chokurdakh and upstream to Ust-Nera via Khonuu. Another route exists, which leads west from Belaya Gora, up the valley of the Uyadina, to the mining settlement of Deputatsky; however, this route is no longer maintained.

The Belaya Gora Airport is located a short distance to the northeast.
