= Kamenka, Ubinsky District, Novosibirsk Oblast =

Kamenka Каменка
- Village
- Location within Novosibirsk Oblast Location within Russia
- Coordinates: 55°08′N 79°40′E
- Country: Russia
- Region: Novosibirsk Oblast
- District: Ubinsky District
- Time zone: UTC+7:00

Kamenka is a rural locality (a village) in Ubinsky District, Novosibirsk Oblast, Russia. There are 3 streets.

== Geography ==
Kamenka is located 18 kilometers (11 miles) south of Ubinskoye, (the district's administrative centre) by road. Raisino is the nearest rural locality. It is also located around 200 kilometers (124 miles) west of Novosibirsk city.

== Notable events ==
On 12 September 2023, an Airbus A320 passenger plane operated by Ural Airlines performed an emergency landing in a field adjacent to Kamenka after a suspected hydraulics-related failure. No one was killed in this incident due to the emergency landing.
