= Ubinsky =

Ubinsky (masculine), Ubinskaya (feminine), or Ubinskoye (neuter) may refer to:

- Ubinsky District, a district of Novosibirsk Oblast, Russia
- Ubinsky (rural locality), a rural locality (a settlement) in Kemerovo Oblast, Russia
- Ubinskoye, a rural locality (a selo) in Ubinsky District of Novosibirsk Oblast, Russia
- Ubinskaya, a rural locality (a stanitsa) in Krasnodar Krai, Russia
