= List of accidents and incidents involving the Airbus A320 family =

The following is a list of accidents and incidents involving the Airbus A320 family and A320neo family of jet airliners. As of March 2024, 180 aviation accidents and incidents have occurred, including 38 hull-loss accidents, resulting in a total of 1490 fatalities.

Through to 2015, the Airbus A320 family has experienced 0.12 fatal hull-loss accidents for every million takeoffs, and 0.26 total hull-loss accidents for every million takeoffs; one of the lowest fatality rates of any airliner.

== Airbus A319 ==
=== 2000s ===
- On 19 January 2003, a Northwest Airlines Airbus A319-100 registered as N313NB, was damaged by maintenance personnel at LaGuardia Airport, Queens, New York, U.S. While being taxied from a maintenance area to the gate, the aircraft struck the gate and a Northwest Airlines Boeing 757, collapsing the nose gear. The Airbus was damaged beyond repair and written off.
- On 10 May 2005, Northwest Airlines Flight 1495, a Northwest Airlines McDonnell Douglas DC-9 registered as N763NC, collided on the ground with a Northwest Airlines Airbus A319-114 registered as N368NB that had just pushed back from the gate at Minneapolis-Saint Paul International Airport, Hennepin County, Minnesota, U.S. On the flight preceding the incident, the DC-9 suffered a malfunction in one of its hydraulic systems while in flight. After landing, the captain shut down one of the plane's engines, inadvertently disabling the remaining working hydraulic system that controlled the aircraft's brakes and reverse thrusters. This caused the DC-9 to contact the Airbus A319 at a speed of 16 mph. Six people were injured and both planes were substantially damaged. The A319 was repaired and returned to service while the DC-9 was written off.
- On 15 September 2006, EasyJet Flight 6074, an Airbus A319-111 registered as G-EZAC, en route from Alicante to Bristol Airport experienced a major electrical system failure near Nantes, France, that caused multiple aircraft systems to become inoperative, including the aircraft's radios, autopilot, the captain's electronic flight instrument display, and TCAS. As a consequence of these failures, the A319 nearly collided with American Airlines Flight AAL63, a Boeing 777-223ER. The crew managed to reconfigure the transponder only and continued on to land at Bristol Airport without any further communication to the air traffic controller.

=== 2010s ===
- On 10 January 2010, United Airlines Flight 634, an Airbus A319 registered as N816UA, experienced problems with its right main landing gear while preparing to land at Newark Liberty International Airport. After unsuccessfully attempting to fix the problem, the flight crew made an emergency landing with the right main landing gear retracted, resulting in substantial damage to the aircraft. All 53 people evacuated the aircraft via the emergency slides. The aircraft was repaired and returned to service.
- On 10 March 2010, Pegasus Airlines Flight 361, an Airbus A319 operated by IZair on a ferry flight, made an emergency landing at Frankfurt Airport, Germany, after a malfunction in the nose gear. The flight landed safely but blew both front nose gear tires. The airport closed runway 07R/25L for 3 hours to allow recovery. The nose gear suffered the same problem as JetBlue Flight 292.
- On 12 August 2010, Azerbaijan Airlines Flight 075, an Airbus A319-111 registered as 4K-AZ04, suffered an undercarriage collapse when the aircraft departed the runway on landing at Atatürk International Airport, Istanbul, Turkey. The aircraft was substantially damaged but all 127 passengers and crew escaped unharmed. The aircraft was later repaired.
- On 24 September 2010, Wind Jet Flight 243, operated by an Airbus A319-132 registered as EI-EDM, landed short of runway 07 while attempting a landing at Palermo Airport, Italy. The aircraft stopped in the grass out of the runway but was seriously damaged and was written off. 34 passengers suffered minor injuries.
- On 24 May 2013, British Airways Flight 762, an Airbus A319-131 registered as G-EUOE, returned to London Heathrow Airport after fan cowl doors detached from both engines shortly after take off. During the approach a fire broke out in the right engine and persisted after the engine was shut down. The aircraft landed safely with no injuries to the 80 people on board. The accident report revealed that the cowlings had been left unlatched following overnight maintenance. The separation of the doors caused airframe damage and the right hand engine fire resulted from a ruptured fuel pipe.
- On 15 January 2018, an Afriqiyah Airways Airbus A319-111 registered as 5A-ONC, was destroyed by artillery fire at Mitiga International Airport in Tripoli, Libya.
- On 14 May 2018, Sichuan Airlines Flight 8633, an Airbus A319-133 registered as B-6419, diverted to Chengdu Shuangliu International Airport after one of the cockpit windshields on the copilot's side blew out during the climb towards cruising altitude. The aircraft landed safely with injuries sustained only to the copilot and a cabin crew member.

=== 2020s ===
- On 12 May 2022, Tibet Airlines Flight 9833, an Airbus A319-100 registered as B-6425, veered off the runway on takeoff in Chongqing Jiangbei International Airport, causing fire. All 122 passengers and crew on board survived, with only minor injuries.
- On 2 February 2025, United Airlines Flight 1382, an Airbus A319-131 registered as N837UA, aborted take-off after catching fire at George Bush Intercontinental Airport in Houston. All passengers were safely evacuated.
- On 3 March 2026, An Iran Air Airbus A319-111 airliner, registration EP-IEP, was destroyed in an air strike at Bushehr Airport in southern Iran.

== Airbus A320 ==
=== 1980s ===
- On 26 June 1988, Air France Flight 296Q, the first passenger flight of the Airbus A320, flown by a Airbus A320-111 registered as F-GFKC, crashed into trees during a demonstration flight at Mulhouse-Habsheim Airport, France. Three passengers out of 136 on board died during the evacuation as the aircraft began to burn. This was the first fatal crash of the Airbus A320 family.

=== 1990s ===
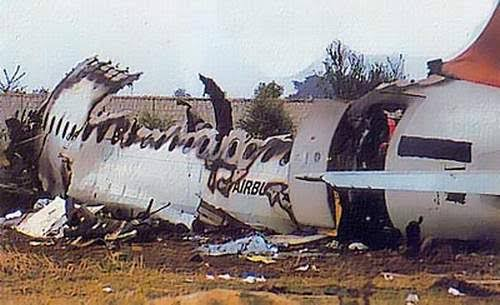
Aftermath of Indian Airlines Flight 605

- On 14 February 1990, Indian Airlines Flight 605, an Airbus A320-231 registered as VT-EPN, crashed on its final approach to the HAL Airport, Bangalore. Of the 146 people on board, 88 passengers and 4 crew members were killed.
- On 20 January 1992, Air Inter Flight 148, an Airbus A320-111 registered as F-GGED, crashed into a high ridge near Mount Sainte-Odile in the Vosges mountains while on final approach to Strasbourg at the end of a scheduled flight from Lyon, France. This accident resulted in the deaths of 87 of the aircraft's 96 occupants (six crew members, 90 passengers).
- On 14 September 1993, Lufthansa Flight 2904, an Airbus A320-211 registered as D-AIPN, crashed into an earth wall at the end of the runway at Frederic Chopin Airport. A fire started in the left wing area and penetrated into the passenger cabin. The training captain and a passenger died.
- On 10 March 1997, a Gulf Air Airbus A320-212 registered as A4O-EM, aborted takeoff at Abu Dhabi International Airport and overran the runway, causing the nosegear to collapse. Everyone on board survived.
- On 22 March 1998, Philippine Airlines Flight 137, a three-month old Airbus A320-214 registered as RP-C3222, overshot the runway of Bacolod City Domestic Airport in Bacolod, Philippines, plowing through homes near it. None of the passengers or crew died, but 44 were injured and 3 on the ground were killed.
- On 12 February 1999, Air France Flight 550, an Airbus A320-211 registered as F-CGXB, collided with a Grob G103 Twin Astir glider over France. Both aircraft landed safely and no one was injured.
- On 16 February 1999, America West Airlines Flight 2811, an Airbus A320-231, received minor damage when it landed at Port Columbus International Airport, Ohio, with the nose wheels rotated 90 degrees. There were no injuries to the 31 people on board.

=== 2000s ===
- On 12 June 2000, America West Airlines Flight 2747, an Airbus A320-232 registered as N655AW, experienced a loss of cowling on the left engine during takeoff from McCarran International Airport in Las Vegas bound for Columbus, Ohio. The aircraft made an emergency landing and no one was injured.
- On 5 July 2000, Royal Jordanian Flight 435, an Airbus A320, was hijacked by a Syrian national while flying to Damascus International Airport, Syria. The plane made an emergency landing back to Queen Alia International Airport, Jordan after the hijacker's grenade exploded, injuring 15 passengers and damaging the aircraft. The hijacker was shot and killed by an air marshal on board.
- On 23 August 2000, Gulf Air Flight 072, an Airbus A320-212 registered as A4O-EK, crashed into the Persian Gulf while performing a go-around during a night visual approach to Bahrain Airport. All 143 passengers and crew on board were killed and it remains the deadliest aviation accident on Bahraini soil.
- On 7 February 2001, Iberia Airlines Flight 1456, an Airbus A320-214 registered EC-HKJ, carrying 143 people, crashed on landing at Bilbao Airport in heavy low level turbulence and gusts. All occupants survived; the aircraft was written off.
- On 17 March 2001, Northwest Airlines Flight 985, an Airbus A320-212 registered as N357NW, rotated prematurely during takeoff from Detroit Metropolitan Airport due to the stabilizer trim having been improperly set. The captain aborted the takeoff and the aircraft overshot the runway. All 151 people on board evacuated the aircraft via the evacuation slides and the aircraft was repaired.
- On 28 August 2002, America West Airlines Flight 794, an Airbus A320-231 registered as N635AW, experienced thrust asymmetry while landing at Phoenix Sky Harbor International Airport and veered off the runway. Ten people were injured (one seriously) and the aircraft was written off.
- On 18 October 2004, TransAsia Airways Flight 536, an Airbus A320-232 registered as B-22310, overran runway 10 while landing at Taipei Songshan Airport and came to rest in a ditch. The crew were found to have mismanaged thrust asymmetry during landing.
- On 21 September 2005, JetBlue Flight 292, an Airbus A320-232 registered as N536JB, executed an emergency landing at Los Angeles International Airport (LAX) after the nose wheels jammed in an abnormal position. No one was injured.
- On 3 May 2006, Armavia Flight 967, an Airbus A320-211 registered as EK-32009, crashed into the Black Sea while attempting to conduct a go-around following its first approach to Sochi Airport, Russia. All 113 passengers and crew on board lost their lives. The accident was caused by controlled flight into terrain due to pilot error.
- On 5 May 2006, 3 Airbus A320s belonging to Armavia, Hellas Jet and Armenian International Airways, along with a Lockheed C-130 Hercules were destroyed in a hangar fire at Brussels Airport.

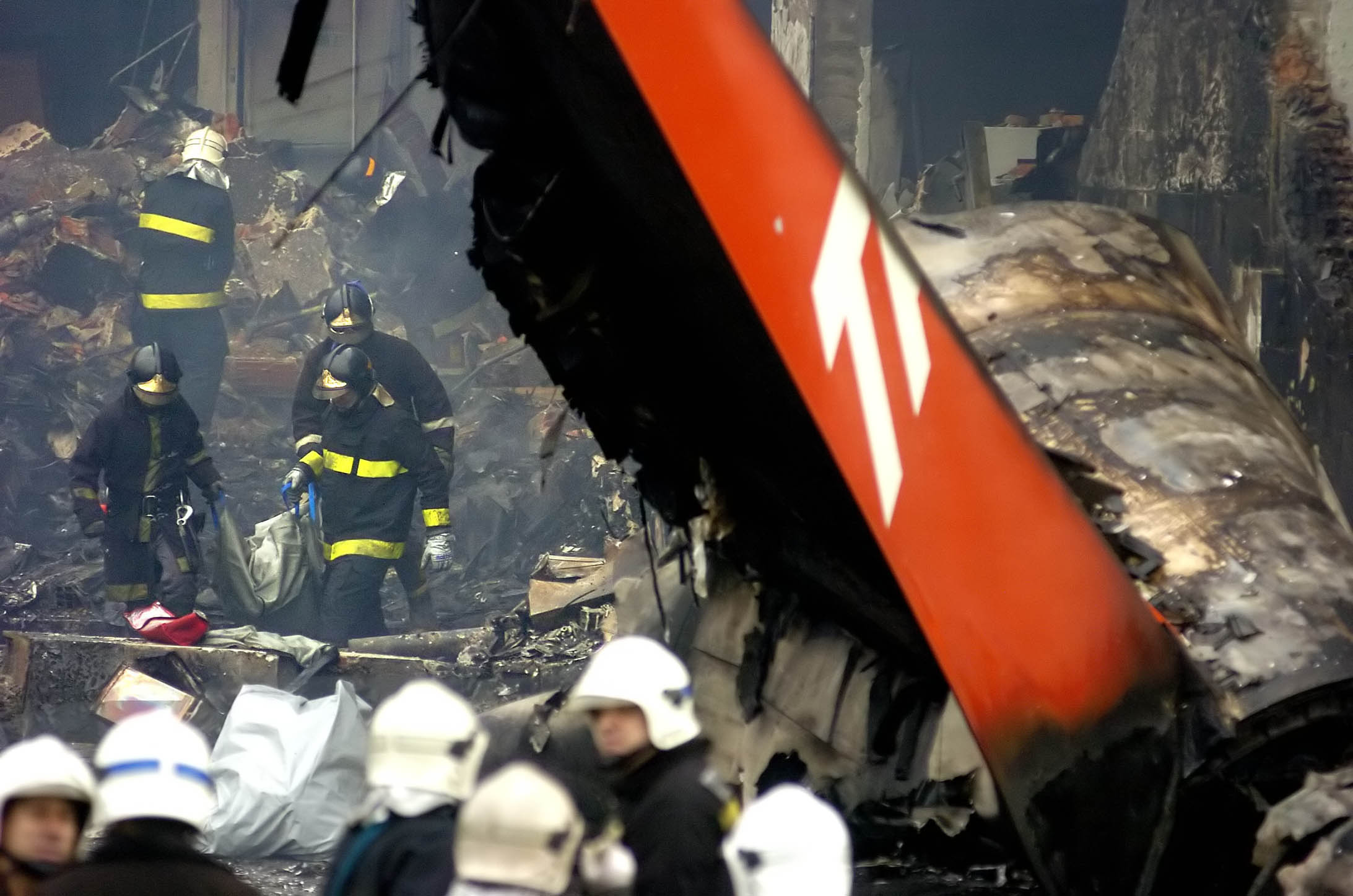
The wreckage of TAM Airlines Flight 3054, photographed the day after the accident

- On 17 July 2007, TAM Airlines Flight 3054, an Airbus A320-233 registered as PR-MBK, crashed into a nearby TAM Express warehouse adjacent to a Shell gas station after overrunning the runway while landing at Congonhas International Airport, where it exploded on impact. One engine thrust reverser had been deactivated. The accident was caused by pilot error by positioning the left throttle into reverse with the right engine throttle being in the climb power setting and bad weather (this was possibly exaggerated by the lack of effective drainage grooving on the runway). All 187 passengers and crew died with 12 ground fatalities, mainly from the TAM headquarters and the gas station at the end of the runway. This crash was the deadliest accident involving the A320 family until the bombing of Metrojet Flight 9268.
- On 20 October 2007, Northwest Airlines Flight 1432, an Airbus A320-211, landed on runway 18 at Hector International Airport, North Dakota, with the nose gear rotated 90 degrees.
- On 26 October 2007, Philippine Airlines Flight 475, an Airbus A320-214 registered as RP-C3224, overshot the runway in Bancasi Airport. Of the 154 people on board, 19 occupants received non-fatal injuries. The aircraft was damaged beyond repair in the accident and written off.
- On 25 February 2008, United Airlines Flight 267, an Airbus A320-232 registered as N442UA, from Denver International Airport, overran the runway at Jackson Hole Airport during landing. There were no fatalities.
- On 30 May 2008, TACA Flight 390, an Airbus A320-233 registered as EI-TAF, overran the runway after landing at Toncontín International Airport in Tegucigalpa, Honduras, in bad weather. There were five fatalities including two on the ground.
- On 27 November 2008, XL Airways Germany Flight 888T, a test flight of an A320-232 registered as D-AXLA (due to change to ZK-OJL), stalled in a low speed test and control could not be regained, causing the aircraft to crash into the sea off the southern French coast. The aircraft was on lease by XL Airways Germany and scheduled to be returned to Air New Zealand. All seven people aboard died.

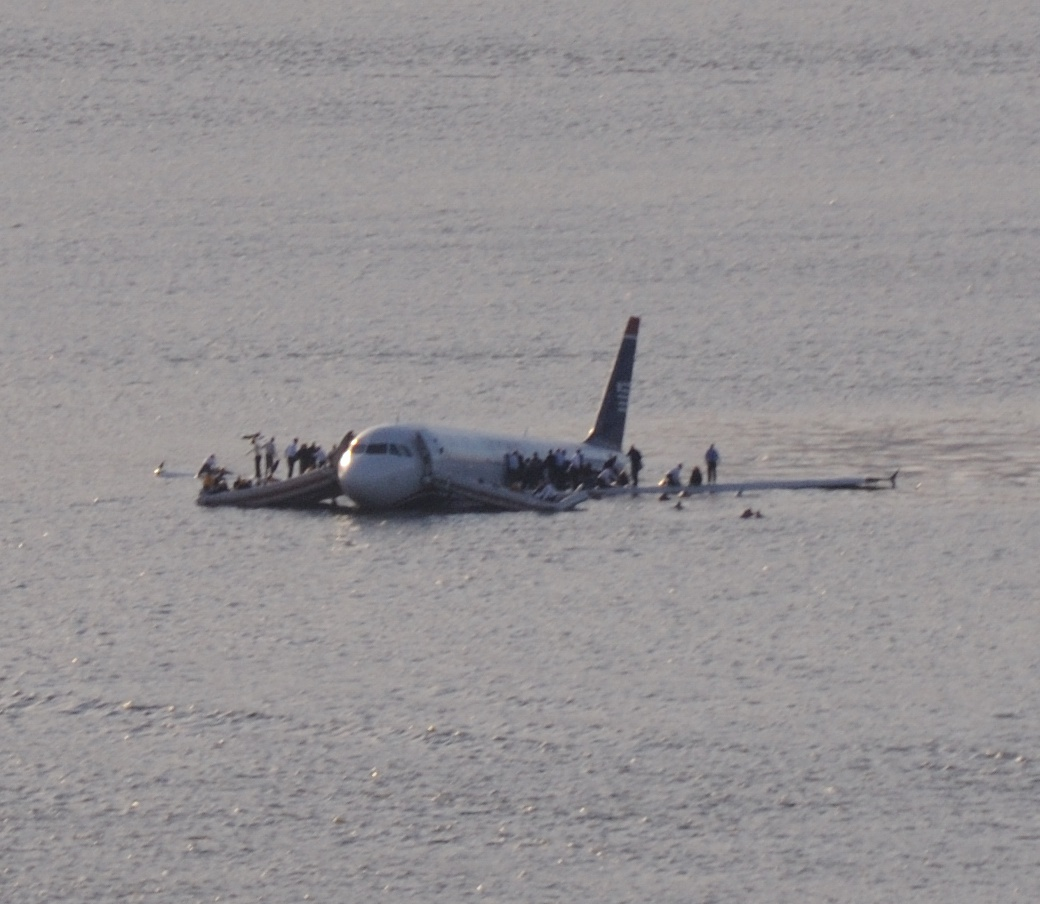
US Airways Flight 1549, ditched in the Hudson River in 2009 with all passengers surviving

- On 15 January 2009, US Airways Flight 1549, an Airbus A320-214 registered as N106US, en route from New York City LaGuardia Airport to Charlotte, North Carolina, ditched into the Hudson River seven minutes after takeoff. The plane was piloted by captain Chesley B. "Sully" Sullenberger and first officer Jeffrey Skiles. All 150 passengers and five crew survived, with only five serious injuries. The accident was due to a bird strike with a flock of Canada geese, which disabled both engines. The entire airframe, including the wings, has been preserved at the Sullenberger Aviation Museum (renamed from the Carolinas Aviation Museum in 2022 in honour of Captain Sullenberger) and is now on display. This was also the first ditching of an A320.

=== 2010s ===
- On 10 January 2011, AirAsia Flight 5218, an Airbus A320-216 registered as 9M-AHH, skidded off the runway at Kuching International Airport, Malaysia. All 123 passengers and 6 crew members survived the accident.
- On 4 April 2011, United Airlines Flight 497, an Airbus A320-232 registered as N409UA, made an emergency landing at Louis Armstrong New Orleans International Airport after reporting smoke on board, which later turned out to be erroneous. The aircraft veered off the runway but no one among the 109 people on board were injured. The aircraft received minor damage, and occupants were evacuated via the emergency slides.
- On 20 April 2011, Vueling Flight 2220, an Airbus A320-211 registered as EC-GRH, landed with the nose gear rotated 90 degrees after an aborted approach and about 20 minutes in a holding pattern. The plane came to a safe stop with damage to the nose wheels and no injuries on board.
- On 29 August 2011, Gulf Air Flight 270, an Airbus A320-214, from Bahrain to Cochin carrying 143 people, skidded off the runway on landing due to pilot error. The weather was poor with heavy rain and strong winds. The aircraft was badly damaged and seven passengers were injured. Some people were reported to have jumped from an emergency exit when the emergency slide failed to deploy.
- On 20 September 2012, Syrian Air Flight 501, an Airbus A320-232 registered as YK-AKF, collided in mid-air with a military helicopter. The A320 lost approximately half its vertical stabilizer but landed safely; the helicopter crashed, killing three of its occupants.
- On 2 June 2013, Cebu Pacific Flight 971, an Airbus A320-214 registered as RP-C3266, excursed from the runway while landing at Francisco Bangoy International Airport. During the approach the pilot had over corrected his alignment with the center line and caused the aircraft's alignment to be on the right half portion of the runway. The pilot mistook the runway's right edge lights for the unlit center lights and thus caused him to instead land on the grass. The nose landing gear was heavily damaged. All of the 165 passengers and the 6 crew survived. The aircraft was repaired and was eventually returned to service.
- On 25 July 2013, a Ural Airlines Airbus A320-214 registered as VQ-BDJ had its nose gear rotated 90 degrees while taxiing at Koltsovo International Airport.
- On 5 January 2014, Air India Flight 890, an Airbus A320-231 registered as VT-ESH, was landing in zero-visibility weather at Jaipur International Airport. The plane missed the runway, blew some tyres and hit some trees with the left wing. All 179 people on board survived the accident. However, the aircraft was written off as a result of the substantial damage.
- On 14 March 2014, US Airways Flight 1702, an Airbus A320-214 registered as N113UW, attempted to take off from Philadelphia, PA, on a flight to Fort Lauderdale, FL, but was unable to take off normally and struck its tail on the runway. After reaching 20 feet off the ground, the pilots rejected takeoff, causing the nose gear to collapse when touching back down on the runway. No one was injured, but the aircraft was damaged beyond repair. Take-off was aborted because the pilot was confused by warning messages, which resulted from incorrect cockpit data inputs while taxiing.

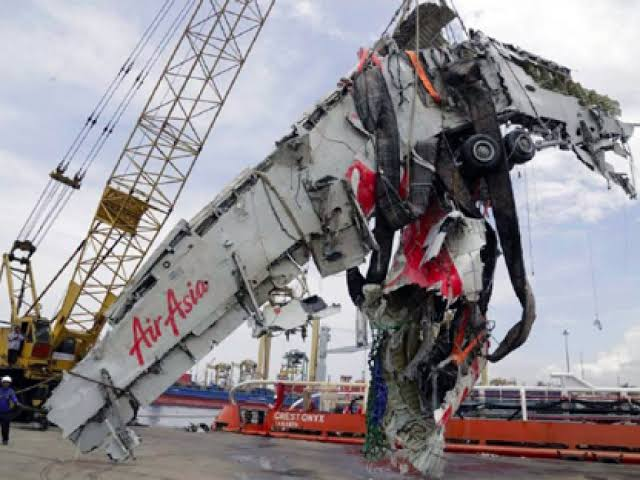
The wreckage of Indonesia AirAsia Flight 8501 after being recovered from the Java Sea.

- On 28 December 2014, Indonesia AirAsia Flight 8501, an Airbus A320-216 registered as PK-AXC, crashed into the Java Sea on the Karimata Strait between the islands of Belitung and Borneo, killing all of the 162 souls on board. It is the only fatal accident involving the Indonesian subsidiary of AirAsia. The cause was initially a malfunction in two of the plane's rudder travel limiter units, followed by incorrect actions by the crew which eventually led the plane to stall while encountering a thunderstorm. The crew ignored the recommended procedure to deal with the problem and reset a circuit breaker which further disengaged the autopilot and other flight protection systems which contributed to the subsequent loss of control. Investigators have stated that the condition of the FAC (Flight Augmentation Control) on the flight "was persistent enough" for the captain to do such actions.
- On 24 March 2015, Germanwings Flight 9525, an Airbus A320-211 registered as D-AIPX, flying from Barcelona to Düsseldorf crashed near Digne in the Southern French Alps, killing all 150 on board. The crash was deliberately caused by the co-pilot Andreas Lubitz, who had previously been treated for suicidal tendencies and been declared "unfit to work" by a doctor. Despite this, Lubitz kept the declaration hidden from his employer and reported for duty.
- On 29 March 2015, Air Canada Flight 624, an Airbus A320-211 registered as C-FTJP, touched down short of the runway while landing at Halifax Stanfield International Airport in low visibility and heavy snow, colliding with a power pole and an antenna array, cutting power to the airport and causing the landing gear to separate from the aircraft. The aircraft was severely damaged, written off, and 23 people received non-life-threatening injuries.
- On 14 April 2015, Asiana Airlines Flight 162, an Airbus A320-232 registered as HL7762 with 82 people on board, lost height on final approach to Hiroshima Airport in Mihara, Japan, struck an instrument landing system localizer antenna and skidded onto the runway on its tail, spinning 180 degrees before coming to a stop. Its main landing gear collapsed and the aircraft suffered damage to its left wing and left engine. No one was killed, but 27 of the 82 people on board were injured, including 1 that was reported to be serious.
- On 25 April 2015, Turkish Airlines Flight 1878, operated by an Airbus A320-232 registered as TC-JPE, was severely damaged in a landing accident at Ataturk International Airport, Istanbul. The aircraft aborted the first hard landing, which inflicted engine and gear damage. On the second attempt at landing, the right gear collapsed and the aircraft rolled off the runway spinning 180 degrees, and was written off. All 97 passengers and 5 crew members were evacuated without any reports of injuries.
- On 29 March 2016, EgyptAir Flight 181 was hijacked during a Flight from Borg El Arab Airport, Alexandria to Cairo International Airport an Airbus A320-232 registered as SU-GCB. The aircraft landed at Larnaca International Airport, Cyprus.
- On 19 May 2016, EgyptAir Flight 804, an Airbus A320-232 registered as SU-GCC, suffered a cockpit fire and crashed into the Mediterranean Sea 20 minutes before its scheduled arrival at Cairo International Airport from Charles de Gaulle Airport. All 66 occupants on board were killed.
- On 23 December 2016, Afriqiyah Airways Flight 209, an Airbus A320-214 registered as 5A-ONB, was hijacked whilst on a flight from Sebha Airport to Tripoli International Airport and diverted to Malta International Airport.
- On 7 July 2017, Air Canada Flight 759, an Airbus A320-211 registered as C-FKCK, carrying 135 passengers and 5 crew, was nearly involved in a major incident at San Francisco International Airport in San Mateo County, California, from Toronto Pearson International Airport. The flight had been cleared by air traffic control to land on San Francisco's runway 28R, however missed the runway; on final approach the aircraft had lined up with a parallel taxiway on which four fully loaded and fueled passenger airplanes were stopped awaiting takeoff clearance. The flight crew initiated a go-around, after which it landed without further incident.
- On 13 October 2017, Cebu Pacific Flight 461, an Airbus A320-214 registered as RP-C3237, excursed from the runway after landing on runway 20 at Iloilo Airport, Philippines. The aircraft skidded off the runway. There were no fatalities among the 180 people on board.
- On 28 February 2018, Smartlynx Estonia Flight 9001, an Airbus A320-214 registered as ES-SAN, was performing touch-and-go training flights runway 08 at Tallinn Airport, Estonia with 7 crew. After about a dozen touch-and-gos, the aircraft touched down at 17:03L (15:03Z), accelerated again, lifted off but could not climb out, touching down again very hard with sparks and flames visible while it became airborne again. The crew declared an emergency, positioned for landing and touched down 150 metres (490 ft; 160 yd) short of runway 26, bursting all tires. The aircraft veered left off the runway. Two occupants received minor injuries; the aircraft sustained substantial damage and was written off.
- On 23 April 2018, Cebu Pacific Flight 849, an Airbus A320-200, flew from Manila to Zamboanga with 172 people on board, got stuck on the runway when the nose gear failed and the plane could not turn. The airport was closed for several hours until the plane could be removed.
- On 9 April 2019, Asiana Airlines Flight 8703, an Airbus A320-232 registered as HL7772, sustained a 90 degree rotation of the nose landing gear on landing at runway 04R at Gwangju Airport. The tires and flanges were damaged, but no fatalities among the 111 people on board resulted.

=== 2020s ===
- On 9 May 2020, a Libyan Airlines Airbus A320-214 was damaged after rockets were launched at Mitiga International Airport, Libya, which damaged airport infrastructure and a number of aircraft. The aircraft received a number of holes to its nose section from shrapnel.
- On 22 May 2020, Pakistan International Airlines Flight 8303, an Airbus A320-214 registered as AP-BLD, landed at Jinnah International Airport gear-up and executed a go-around. A few minutes later, both engines had shut down. The plane crashed into Model Colony near Karachi on final approach to Jinnah International Airport for an attempted emergency landing, killing 97 of 99 on board, as well as killing 1 on the ground.
- On 6 March 2021, Batik Air Flight 6803, an Airbus A320-214 registered as PK-LUT, had its nose gear rotated 90 degrees while taxiing at Jambi Airport and took off from the runway. The plane could not retract the landing gear after taking off from Jambi Airport and had to turn back. The plane landed with its nose gear still rotated 90 degrees. The passengers and crew members did not receive any injuries and exited the aircraft using stairs on the runway.
- On 10 February 2021, a flyadeal Airbus A320-214 registered as HZ-FAB was reportedly damaged after a Houthi drone attack at Abha International Airport in Saudi Arabia. No one was reported injured and investigations are still ongoing. The aircraft was repaired, and returned to service.
- On 18 March 2021, Viva Aerobus Flight 4343, an Airbus A320-232 registered as XA-VAZ, suffered a nose landing gear collapse while making a 180 turn to line up for takeoff from runway 22 at Puerto Vallarta-Gustavo D. Ordaz Airport, Mexico. All 133 occupants on board safely evacuated the plane via the emergency slides.
- On 22 January 2022, JetBlue Flight 1748, an Airbus A320-232 registered as N760JB, sustained a tailstrike while attempting to avoid a runway incursion during takeoff from Yampa Valley Airport. The aircraft diverted to Denver International Airport and landed safely with no injured. The aircraft was repaired.
- On 29 March 2022, LATAM Flight 4292, an Airbus A320-214 registered as CC-BAS, experienced a serious incident after it had its nose gear locked at a 90-degree angle on takeoff. The tires were damaged, and the plane returned to the airport. There were no injuries on board.
- On 6 July 2022, British Airways Flight 820, an Airbus A320-232 registered as G-EUUV, sustained minor fire damage due to hydraulic fluid leaking onto overheating brakes after landing at Copenhagen Airport.
- On 10 July 2022, Spirit Airlines Flight 383, an Airbus A320-232 registered as N693NK, had its left main landing gear wheels catch on fire while landing on Runway 28 at Hartsfield-Jackson Atlanta International Airport, Georgia. No injuries were reported and the aircraft was towed away for maintenance.
- On 26 October 2022, LATAM Chile Flight 1325, an Airbus A320-214 registered as CC-BAZ, was on approach to Asunción-Silvio Pettirossi International Airport when the aircraft encountered a hail storm. The aircraft lost most of its nose radome, suffered damage to its windshield and lost both engines which led to the Ram Air Turbine being deployed. The aircraft made an emergency landing at Asunción with no injuries aboard.
- On 10 November 2022, Middle East Airlines Flight 311, an Airbus A320-232 registered as OD-MRM, suffered by a bullet being hit as it was landing in Beirut from Amman. There were no reported injuries.
- On 12 September 2023, Ural Airlines Flight 1383, an Airbus A320-200 registered as RA-73805, operating a flight from Sochi International Airport to Omsk Tsentralny Airport made a gear-down emergency landing in a field at Kamenka in the Western Siberian Region of Novosibirsk in Russia. Initial reports states that the aircraft sounded an alarm for hydraulic systems failure. There were no reported injuries.
- On 30 October 2025, JetBlue Flight 1230, an Airbus A320-232 registered as N605JB, suffered a brief flight control malfunction due to data corruption possibly caused by solar radiation. The aircraft lost altitude injuring more than 15 passengers. The aircraft was diverted to Tampa, Florida. The incident led to Airbus issuing an urgent airworthiness directive temporarily grounding Airbus A320-family aircraft until flight software was updated in December.
- On 8 October 2026, as part of a series of Houthi-conducted attacks on Saudi Arabian airports, an A320 operated by Saudia was destroyed during missile strikes at King Khalid International Airport in Riyadh, resulting in three fatalities and several injuries.

== Airbus A320neo ==
=== 2020s ===
- On 26 January 2021, Pegasus Airlines Flight 939, an Airbus A320-251N, registered as TC-NBH, landed on runway 15 at Basel Mulhouse-Freiburg EuroAirport with the nose landing gear rotated 90 degrees.
- On 2 September 2022, TAP Air Portugal Flight 1492, an Airbus A320-251N registered as CS-TVI, with 79 people on board, collided with a motorcycle while landing at Ahmed Sékou Touré International Airport. There were no fatalities on board, but both occupants on the motorcycle were killed. The aircraft was substantially damaged. However, it was brought back to service after repairs.
- On 18 November 2022, LATAM Airlines Perú Flight 2213, an Airbus A320-271N registered as CC-BHB, was in its takeoff roll at runway 16 of Jorge Chávez International Airport when the crew spotted a fire truck crossing the runway and rejected the takeoff. The aircraft was unable to avoid the firetruck and struck it with its right hand engine, killing both fire fighters aboard the firetruck and causing the right main landing gear of the aircraft to collapse and the right hand engine to separate. A fire started and resulted in substantial damage. Everyone on board the aircraft, specifically 102 passengers and 6 crew members, survived with 40 occupants sustaining injuries. The aircraft was written off, and resulted in the first hull loss of the Airbus A320neo family.
- On 10 September 2023, Air China Flight 403, an Airbus A320-271N, registered as B-305J, with 155 people on board, had a fire in its left engine right before landing at Singapore Changi Airport. The aircraft landed safely at its destination with all passengers and crew members safely evacuated. Nine passengers received minor injuries that related to inhalation and abrasions during the evacuation via the emergency slides.

== Airbus A321 ==
=== 2000s ===
- On 16 November 2001, an Airbus A321-200, with the registration F-OHMP, was operating as Middle East Airlines Flight 304 from Beirut International Airport to Cairo International Airport when it sustained damage during a tailstrike accident upon landing at Cairo. This airframe would be destroyed by a bomb nearly 14 years later mid-flight as Metrojet Flight 9268.
- On 21 March 2003, TransAsia Airways Flight 543, an Airbus A321-131 registered as B-22603, collided with a truck on the runway while landing at Tainan Airport. The 175 passengers and crew were evacuated unharmed but two people in the truck were injured. The aircraft was severely damaged and was written off.
- On 18 September 2005, Spirit Airlines Flight 171, an Airbus A321-231 registered as N583NK, bounced during landing at Fort Lauderdale–Hollywood International Airport, sustaining a tailstrike. None of the 197 people on board were injured and the aircraft was repaired.

=== 2010s ===
- On 28 July 2010, Airblue Flight 202, an Airbus A321-231 registered as AP-BJB, crashed in the Margalla Hills, Islamabad, Pakistan. The weather was poor with low visibility. During a non-standard self-created approach below the minimum descent altitude, the aircraft crashed into the ground after the captain ignored 21 cockpit warnings to pull-up. There were no survivors. The commander, Pervez Iqbal Chaudry, was one of Airblue's most senior pilots with more than 35 years experience. The accident was the first fatal accident involving the A321, and the deadliest plane crash in Pakistan.
- On 5 November 2014, Lufthansa Flight 1829, an Airbus A321-231 registered as D-AIDP, was flying from Bilbao to Munich when the aircraft, while on autopilot, lowered the nose into a descent reaching 4000 fpm. The uncommanded pitch-down was caused by two angle of attack sensors that were jammed in their positions, causing the fly by wire protection to believe the aircraft entered a stall while it climbed through FL310. The Alpha Protection activated, forcing the aircraft to pitch down, which required the pilots to continually use more than 50% of full stick input to correct. The crew disconnected the related Air Data Units and were able to recover the aircraft. The event was also reported in the German press several days before the Germanwings crash. The German Federal Bureau of Aircraft Accident Investigation (BFU) reported on the incident on 17 March 2015 in a Bulletin publishing the flight data recorder and pitch control data in English and German. As a result of this incident an Airworthiness Directive made mandatory the Aircraft Flight Manual amended by the procedure the manufacturer had described in the FOT and the OEB and a subsequent information of flight crews prior to the next flight. EASA issued a similar Airworthiness Directive for the aircraft types A330/340.
- On 15 August 2015, American Airlines Flight 1851, an Airbus A321-231 registered as N564UW, suffered a loss of lift and hit the runway approach lights followed by a tail strike onto the runway surface while attempting to go-around at Charlotte-Douglas International Airport after experiencing a small microburst on approach. It was determined that the appropriate windshear precautions were not applied.

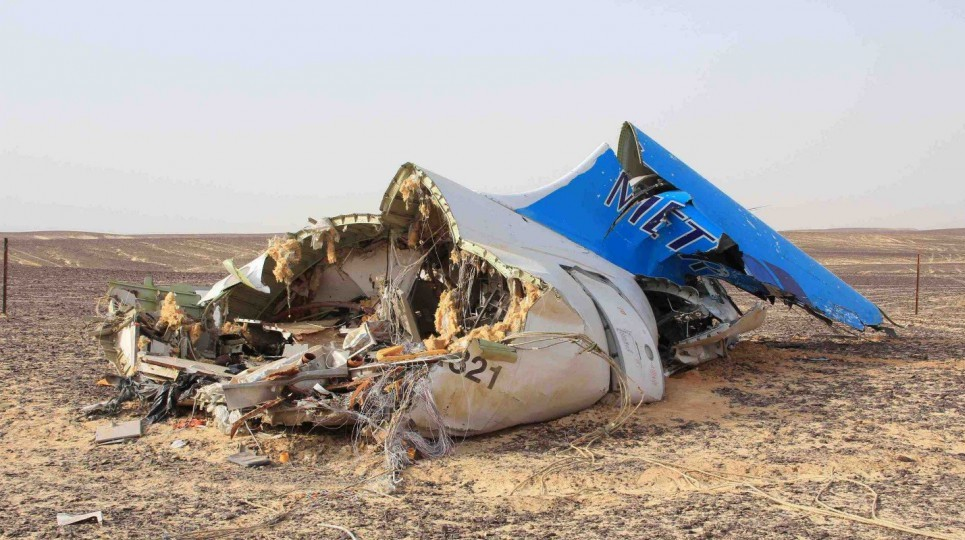
The wreckage of the tail section of Metrojet Flight 9268

- On 31 October 2015, Metrojet Flight 9268, an Airbus A321-231 registered as EI-ETJ operated by Russian airline company Kogalymavia and branded as Metrojet, crashed in the Hasana area of central Sinai, Egypt while en route from Sharm El Sheikh, Egypt to St. Petersburg, Russia. There were 224 people on board (217 passengers and 7 crew). There were no survivors. The flight disappeared from radar 23 minutes after take-off. ADS-B tracking of the A321 onboard flight sensors by Flightradar24 indicates that the flight was at 31,000 feet before a rapid descent. The cause of the crash was likely an onboard explosive device, and that ISIL has claimed that it brought down the aircraft.
- On 2 February 2016, Daallo Airlines Flight 159, an Airbus A321-111 registered as SX-BHS, suffered an in-flight explosion five minutes after takeoff, injuring two passengers; the explosion blew a hole in the fuselage, causing a passenger to fall out of the plane. The passenger's severely burnt body was found on the ground in the village of Dhiiqaaley near Balad, Somalia. The aircraft returned to Mogadishu and was able to land safely. Investigators determined that explosion was caused by a suicide bomber who detonated explosives. The bomber was the same passenger who fell out of the aircraft.
- On 8 December 2017, a Qatar Airways Airbus A321-231 registered as A7-AIB was damaged beyond economic repair by a fire at Hamad International Airport, Doha, Qatar.
- On 10 April 2019, American Airlines Flight 300, an Airbus A321-231(WL) registered as N114NN, had its left wing hit the ground and a marker during takeoff at John F. Kennedy International Airport. The plane took off safely and returned to the airport. There were no injuries reported among the 110 people on board, but the aircraft was substantially damaged and was eventually written off.
- On 15 August 2019, Ural Airlines Flight 178, an Airbus A321-211 registered as VQ-BOZ, flying from Zhukovsky International Airport to Simferopol and carrying 226 passengers and 7 crew, suffered a double engine bird strike shortly after takeoff, and subsequently made an emergency landing in a cornfield less than 3 nautical miles (5.6 km; 3.5 mi) from the runway with its landing gear up. There were no fatalities, but 23 people were hospitalized.

=== 2020s ===
- On 26 February 2020, a Titan Airways Airbus A321-211 registered as G-POWN, encountered problems with both engines shortly after takeoff from Gatwick Airport. The flight was a positioning operation without passengers en route to Stansted Airport. The aircraft made a successful emergency landing back at Gatwick Airport. There were no injuries. The cause was a fueling error in which an excessive quantity of Kathon had been added to the fuel.
- On 26 May 2023, Asiana Airlines Flight 8124, an Airbus A321-231 registered as HL8256. A port-side emergency exit was opened by a passenger while the aircraft was on approach to Daegu International Airport on a flight from Jeju Island. The emergency slide deployed and was ripped off. The aircraft landed safely, but at least six people were injured and taken to a hospital. The passenger that opened the exit was arrested.
- On 28 January 2025, an Airbus A321-200 operating as Air Busan Flight 391 operated by Air Busan caught fire before takeoff at Gimhae International Airport bound for Hong Kong, resulting in four injuries and the evacuation of all 176 people on board. The aircraft was written off.
- On 8 October 2026 amidst the Houthi attacks on Saudi airports, an airbus A321-200 was destroyed at King Khalid airport.

== Airbus A321neo ==
=== 2010s ===
- On 29 November 2018, VietJet Air Flight 356, an Airbus A321-271N registered as VN-A653, lost both wheels of its nosegear in a hard landing at Buon Ma Thuot Airport, Đắk Lắk Province, after a flight from Tan Son Nhat International Airport. Passengers were evacuated via emergency slides, with six injuries reported.

=== 2020s ===
- On 15 April 2025, Frontier Airlines Flight 3506, an Airbus A321-271NX registered as N607FR, suffered a hard landing during attempt landing at Luis Muñoz Marín International Airport, sustaining nose wheel and engine damage. The aircraft was forced to go around and landed safely afterwards. There were no fatalities or injuries. The incident remained under investigation.
- On 8 May 2026, Frontier Airlines Flight 4345, an Airbus A321-271NX registered as N646FR was taking off on runway 17L, at Denver International Airport, Colorado, and struck a person on the runway, leading to an engine fire and aborted takeoff. The aircraft was evacuated.
