= Yamal Airlines =

Airline of Russia

JSC "Yamal Airlines" ОАО "Авиационная транспортная компания "Ямал"

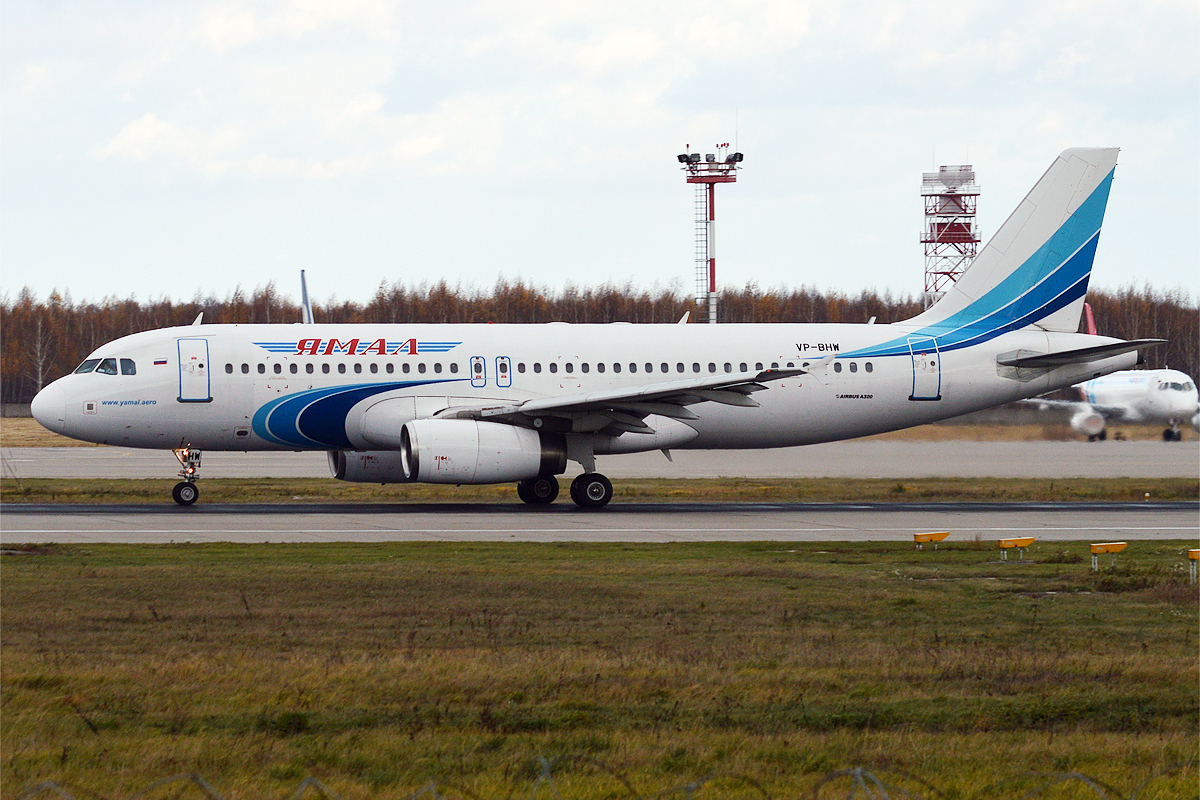
- Yamal Airlines Airbus A320-232
IATA	ICAO	Call sign
YC	LLM	YAMAL
- Founded: 1997; 29 years ago
- Hubs: Tyumen
- Secondary hubs: Moscow-Domodedovo; Salekhard
- Focus cities: Anapa; Chelyabinsk; Moscow-Zhukovsky
- Fleet size: 24
- Destinations: 17
- Headquarters: Salekhard, Russia
- Key people: Vasilii Kryuk (Director General)
- Website: yamalaero.ru

Yamal Airlines (Russian: ОАО "Авиационная транспортная компания "Ямал", OAO Aviacionnaja transportnaja kompania "Yamal") is a Russian airline based in Salekhard, Yamalo-Nenets Autonomous Okrug, Russia. It operates regional and international passenger services and was established in 1997.

It is currently banned from flying in the EU.

== Destinations ==
As of November 2023, the airline operates flights in two countries on 43 routes.

Yamal Airlines serves the following destinations:

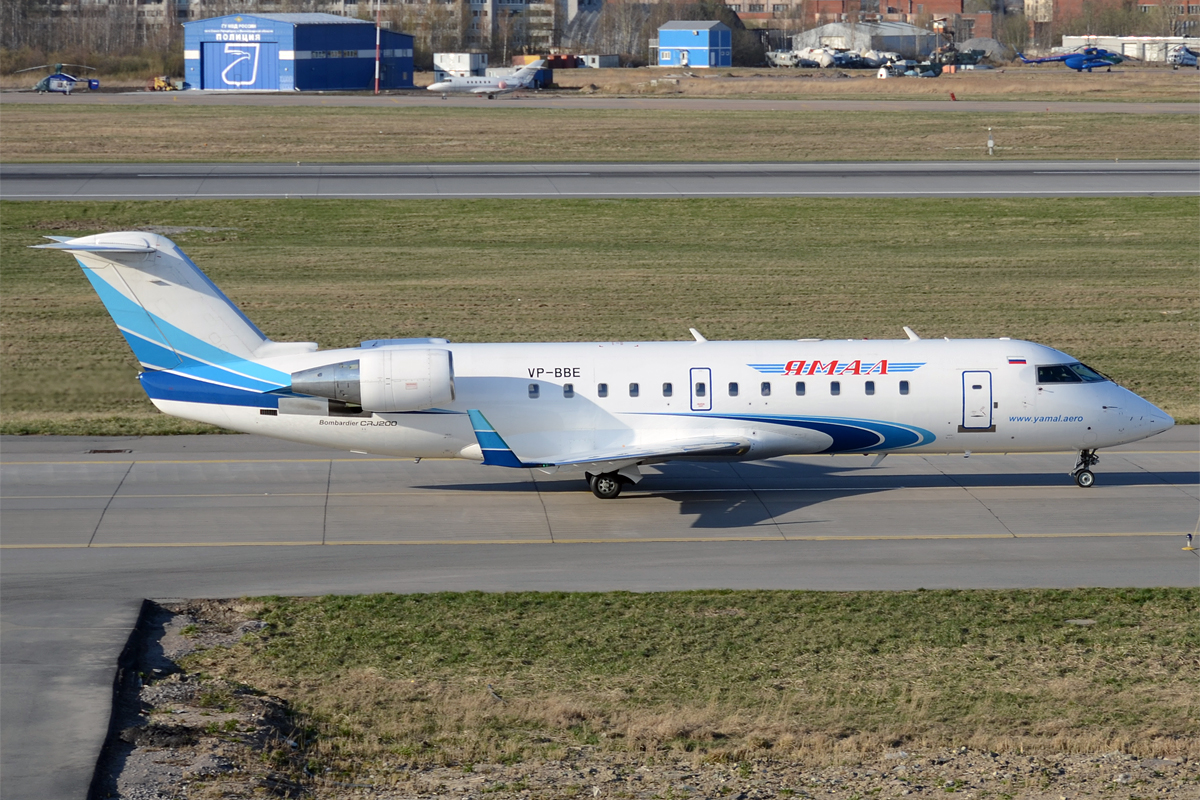
Yamal Airlines Bombardier CRJ-200 in Moscow Domodedovo Airport

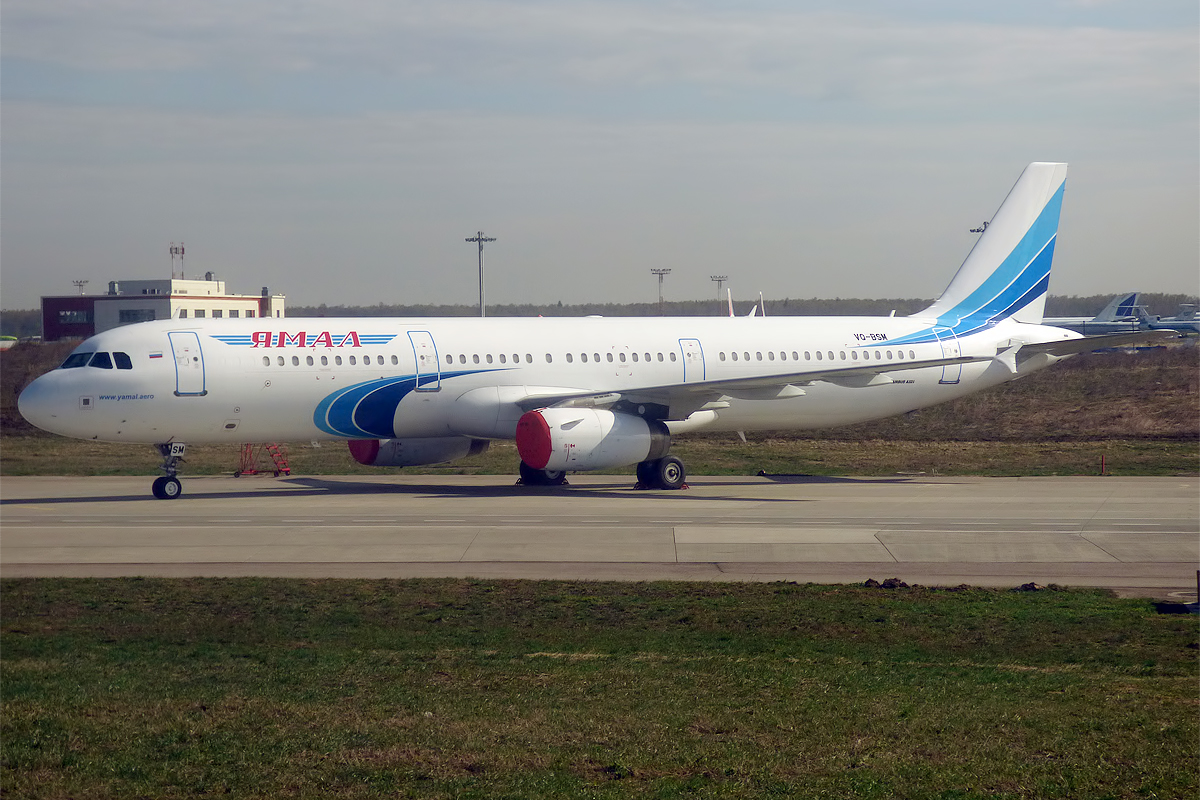
Yamal Airlines Airbus A321 at Salekhard Airport

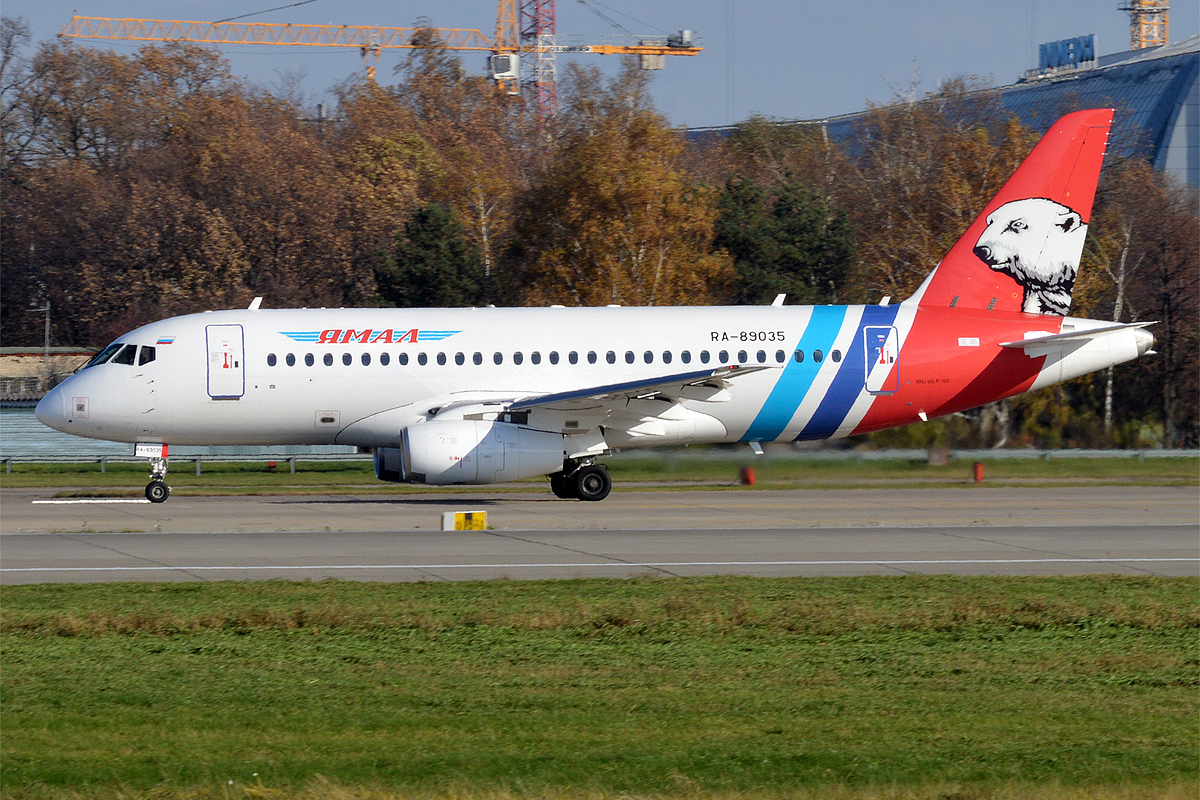
Yamal Airlines Sukhoi Superjet 100 at Roshchino International Airport

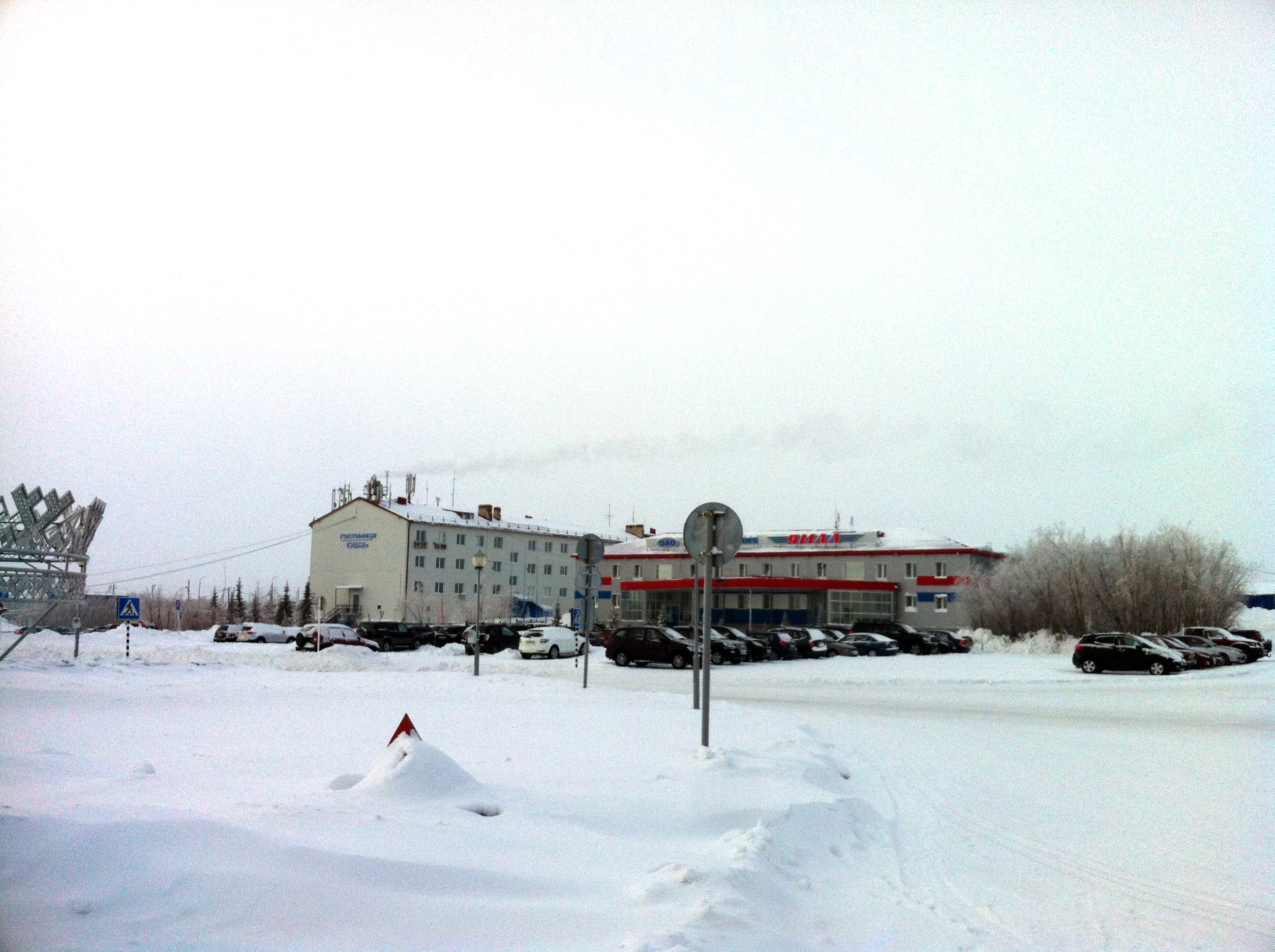
Yamal Airlines headquarters in Salekhard

Country	City	Airport	Notes	Refs
Bulgaria	Burgas	Burgas Airport	Terminated	
Belarus	Minsk	Minsk National Airport		
Israel	Tel Aviv	David Ben Gurion International Airport	Terminated	
Kazakhstan	Almaty	Almaty International Airport	Terminated	
Kazakhstan	Aqtau	Aqtau Airport	Terminated	
Montenegro	Tivat	Tivat Airport	Terminated	
Russia	Anapa	Anapa Airport	Focus city	
Russia	Arkhangelsk	Talagi Airport		
Russia	Belgorod	Belgorod International Airport	Terminated	
Russia	Chelyabinsk	Balandino Airport	Focus city	
Russia	Gelendzhik	Gelendzhik Airport	Terminated	
Russia	Gorno-Altaysk	Gorno-Altaysk Airport		
Russia	Kazan	Ğabdulla Tuqay Kazan International Airport		
Russia	Kaluga	Grabtsevo Airport		
Russia	Kirovsk / Apatity	Khibiny Airport		
Russia	Kogalym	Kogalym Airport		
Russia	Krasnoyarsk	Yemelyanovo Airport		
Russia	Kurgan	Kurgan Airport		
Russia	Kursk	Kursk Vostochny Airport	Terminated	
Russia	Moscow	Moscow Domodedovo Airport	Secondary Hub	
Russia	Moscow	Sheremetyevo International Airport		
Russia	Moscow	Zhukovsky International Airport	Terminated	
Russia	Nadym	Nadym Airport		
Russia	Nizhnevartovsk	Nizhnevartovsk Airport		
Russia	Novy Urengoy	Novy Urengoy Airport		
Russia	Noyabrsk	Noyabrsk Airport		
Russia	Omsk	Omsk Tsentralny Airport		
Russia	Orenburg	Orenburg Tsentralny Airport		
Russia	Perm	Bolshoye Savino Airport		
Russia	Rostov-on-Don	Platov International Airport	Terminated	
Russia	Saint Petersburg	Pulkovo Airport		
Russia	Salekhard	Salekhard Airport	Secondary Hub	
Russia	Samara	Kurumoch International Airport		
Russia	Sochi	Sochi International Airport		
Russia	Surgut	Surgut Airport		
Russia	Tyumen	Roschino International Airport	Hub	
Russia	Ufa	Ufa International Airport		
Turkey	Antalya	Antalya International Airport		
Ukraine	Simferopol	Simferopol International Airport	Terminated	
United Arab Emirates	Dubai	Al Maktoum International Airport	Seasonal	
Uzbekistan	Tashkent	Tashkent International Airport	Terminated	

== Financial indicators ==
In 2023, revenue was 22.3 billion rubles.

Revenue for 2024 amounted to 22.4 billion rubles, and revenue – 438 million rubles.

== Codeshare Agreements ==
- S7 Airlines
- Utair

== Fleet ==
As of August 2025, Yamal Airlines operates the following aircraft:

Yamal Airlines fleet
Aircraft	In service	Orders	Passengers			Notes
Aircraft	In service	Orders	J	Y	Total	Notes
Airbus A320-200	8	—	8	156	164	
Bombardier CRJ200LR	2	—	–	50	50	
Sukhoi Superjet 100	15	—	8	90	98	
Total	25	—				
