= Metrojet Flight 9268 =

2015 aircraft bombing over Egypt

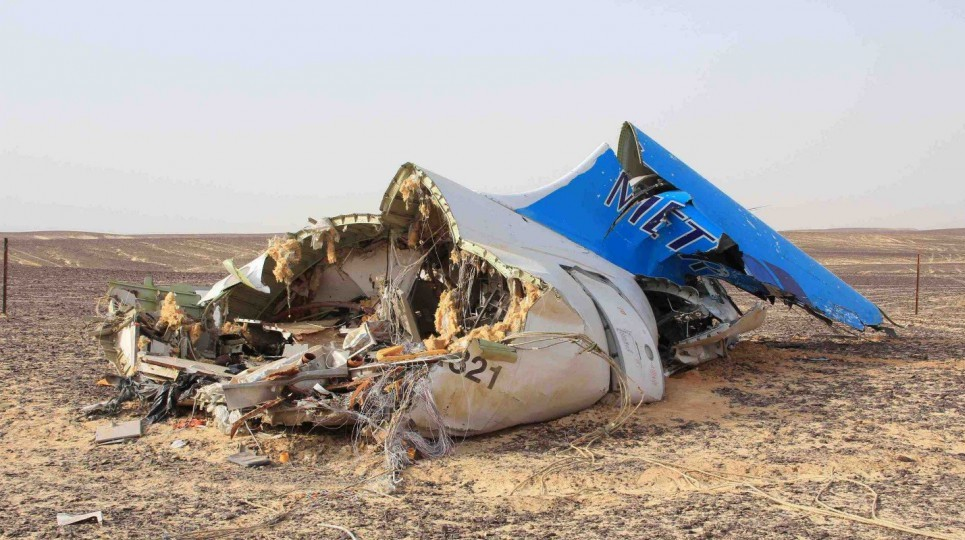
- Wreckage of the aircraft's tail section

Bombing
- Date: 31 October 2015
- Summary: In-flight breakup due to terrorist bombing by Islamic State's Sinai branch
- Site: Near Housna, North Sinai Governorate, Egypt; 30°10′9″N 34°10′22″E

Aircraft
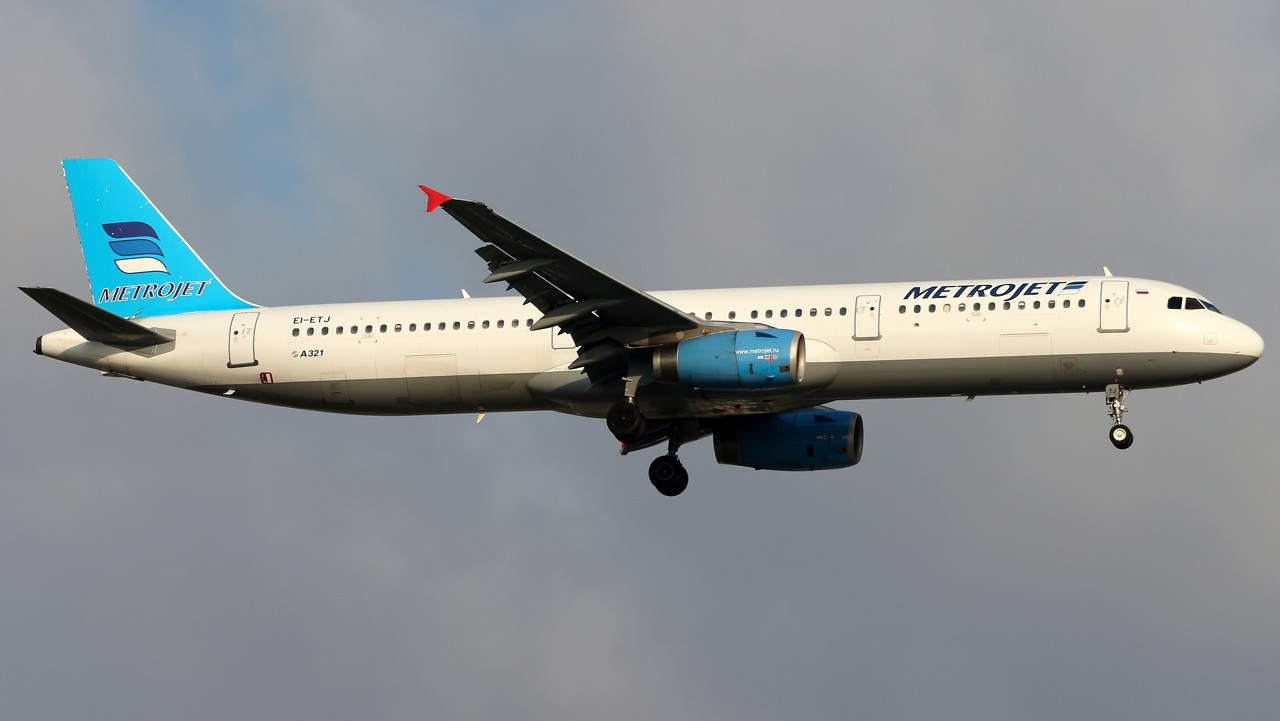
- EI-ETJ, the aircraft involved, seen in June 2015
- Aircraft type: Airbus A321-231
- Operator: Kogalymavia operating under Metrojet
- IATA flight No.: 7K9268
- ICAO flight No.: KGL9268
- Call sign: KOGALYM 9268
- Registration: EI-ETJ
- Flight origin: Sharm El Sheikh International Airport, Sinai Peninsula, Egypt
- Destination: Pulkovo Airport, Saint Petersburg, Russia
- Occupants: 224
- Passengers: 217
- Crew: 7
- Fatalities: 224
- Survivors: 0

Metrojet Flight 9268 was an international chartered passenger flight operated by Russian airline Kogalymavia (branded as Metrojet). On 31 October 2015, at 06:13 EST (04:13 UTC), the Airbus A321 operating the flight exploded above the northern Sinai Peninsula following its departure from Sharm El Sheikh International Airport, Egypt, en route to Pulkovo Airport, Saint Petersburg, Russia. All 224 passengers and crew on board were killed, making it the deadliest plane crash to involve the Airbus A320 family and the deadliest to occur in Egypt. Russian investigators concluded that the cause of the crash was most likely an onboard explosive device.

The passengers, most of whom were tourists, included 212 Russians, four Ukrainians and one Belarusian. The crew of seven were all Russian. Investigators believed that a bomb was placed in the aircraft at Sharm El Sheikh, with the goal of causing airlines to suspend flights to and from the airport.

Shortly after the crash, the Islamic State's Sinai Branch (IS-SP), previously known as Ansar Bait al-Maqdis, assumed responsibility for the incident, which occurred in the vicinity of the Sinai insurgency. IS-SP assumed responsibility on Twitter, on video and in a statement by Abu Osama al-Masri, the leader of the group's Sinai branch. IS posted photos of what it said was the bomb in Dabiq, its online magazine.

By 4 November 2015, British and American authorities suspected that a bomb was responsible for the crash. On 8 November 2015, an anonymous member of the Egyptian investigation team said that the investigators were "90 percent sure" that the jet was destroyed by a bomb. Lead investigator Ayman al-Muqaddam said that other possible causes of the crash included a fuel explosion, metal fatigue and lithium batteries overheating. The Russian Federal Security Service announced on 17 November 2015 that it was a terrorist attack caused by an improvised bomb containing the equivalent of up to 1 kilogram (2.2 lb) of TNT. The Russians said they found evidence of explosive residue. On 24 February 2016, Egyptian president Abdel Fattah el-Sisi acknowledged that terrorism caused the crash.

In March 2020, an Egyptian appeals court ruled that the crash was not an act of terrorism, and it dismissed lawsuits against government officials, Metrojet and Ingosstrakh. The court ruled that the identities of the 224 victims had not been officially established and that it was thus impossible to issue compensation. No final report has been produced.

== Aircraft ==
The aircraft was an 18-year-old Airbus A321-231, serial number 663, registered as EI-ETJ, manufactured in 1997. It had logged approximately 56,000 airframe hours and 21,000 takeoff and landing cycles.

On 16 November 2001, while operating as Middle East Airlines Flight 304, the aircraft suffered severe tailstrike damage while landing in Cairo, Egypt. Within three months, the aircraft was repaired and returned to service.

At the time of the crash, the aircraft was owned by Dublin-based AerCap and leased to Kolavia.

== Passengers and crew ==
People on board by nationality
Nationality	Passengers	Crew	Total
Russia	212	7	219
Ukraine	4	0	4
Belarus	1	0	1
Total	217	7	224

Flight 9268 was carrying 217 passengers, of which 25 were children, plus seven crew members. The captain was 47-year-old Valery Yurievich Nemov and the first officer was Sergei Stanislavovich Trukhachev. According to the airline, Captain Nemov had amassed more than 12,000 hours of flight time, including 3,800 hours on the aircraft type. First Officer Trukhachev had 5,641 hours of flight time, including more than 1,300 hours on the aircraft type.

The Russian embassy confirmed that most of the passengers and all of the crew members were Russian. There were also one Belarusian and four Ukrainian passengers on board. Most of the passengers were tourists returning from Red Sea resorts. The Association of Tour Operators of Russia released the passenger manifest of all those thought to have been on the flight. The majority of the passengers were from northwest Russia, including Saint Petersburg and the surrounding Leningrad, Novgorod and Pskov oblasts. A large number of children were orphaned by the crash, as many parents on the flight had left their children behind in Russia.

== Incident ==
The route of the aircraft. The black dot indicates the starting point of the flight; the red dot indicates the last position at which the aircraft was tracked.

Flight 9268 left Sharm El Sheikh at 05:50 EGY (03:50 UTC) on 31 October 2015 for Pulkovo Airport in Saint Petersburg, Russia with 217 passengers and seven crew members on board. The aircraft failed to make contact with Cyprus air-traffic control 23 minutes later.

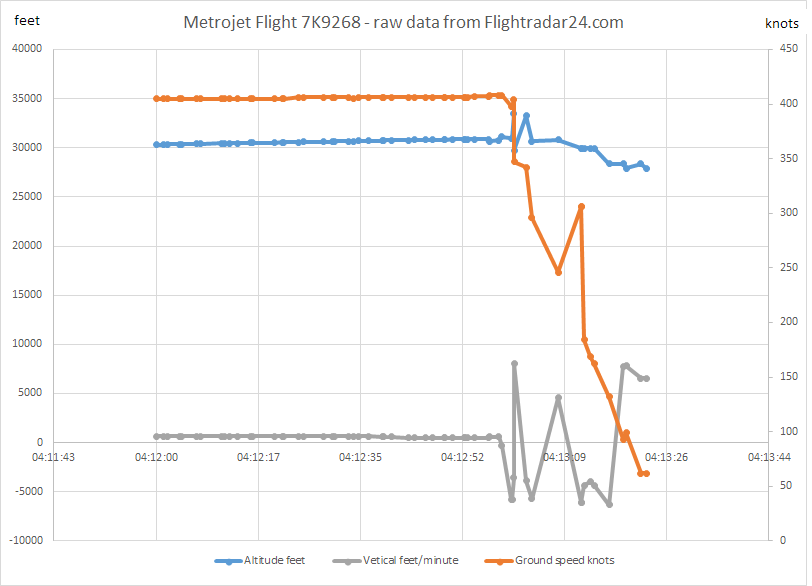
Last data received by Flightradar24.com

Flight data received by FlightRadar24.com receivers since 04:12:00 UTC

Russian media outlets claimed that the pilot reported technical problems and had requested a landing at the nearest airport before the A321 went missing. This claim was disputed by other sources, including the Egyptian authorities, and subsequent analysis of the flight recorder data confirmed that the claim was false. The Egyptian Civilian Aviation Ministry indicated the flight was at an altitude of 31,000 ft (9,400 m) when it disappeared from radar screens after a steep descent of 5,000 ft (1,500 m) in one minute. Flightradar24 shows the aircraft climbing to 33,500 ft (10,200 m) at 404 kn (748 km/h; 465 mph) before suddenly descending to 28,375 ft (8,649 m) at 62 kn (115 km/h; 71 mph) approximately 50 km (31 mi; 27 nmi) north east of Nekhel, after which its position was no longer tracked.

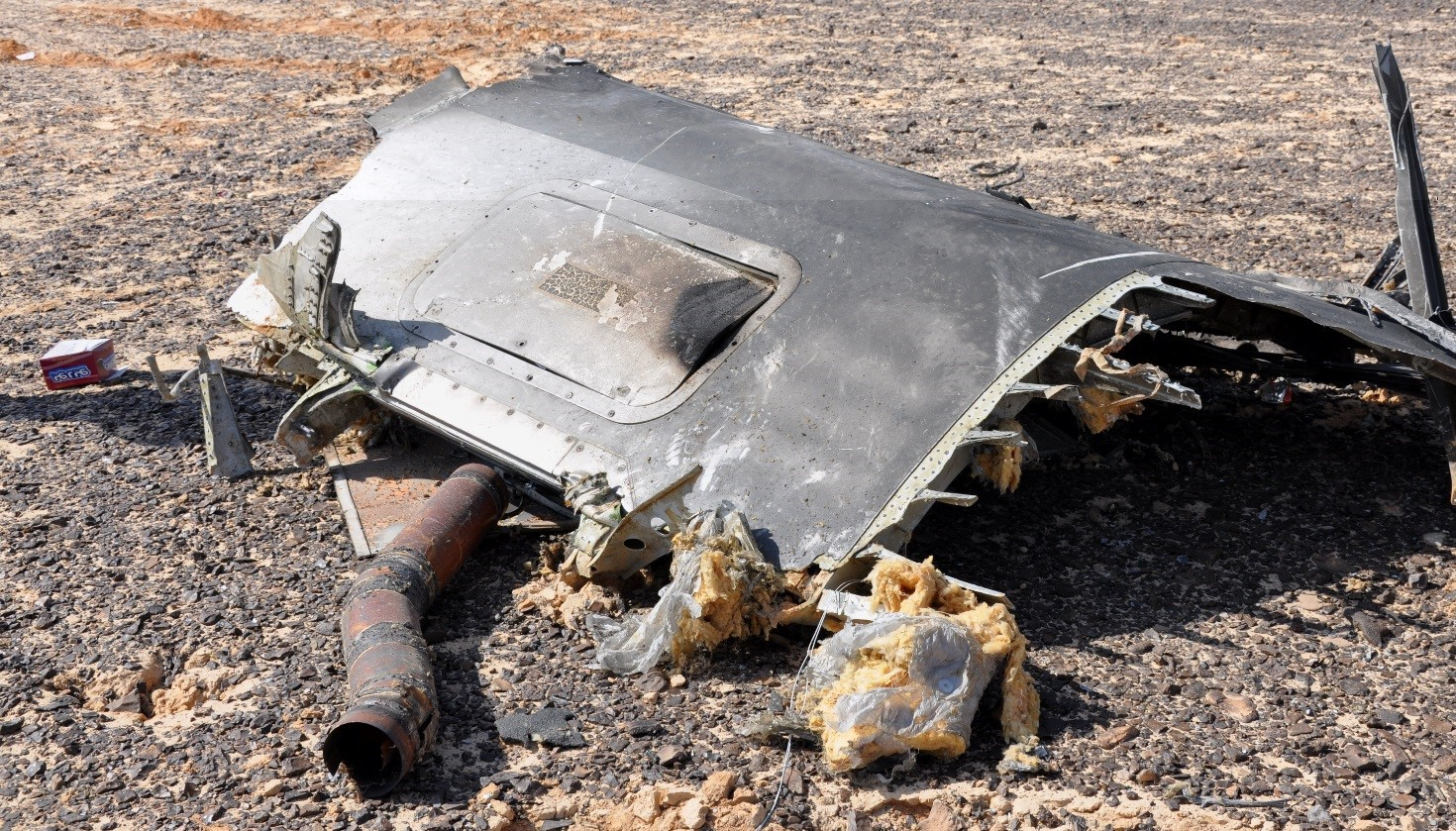
The wreckage of Flight 9268

Wreckage was scattered over 20 square kilometres (8 sq mi; 6 sq nmi), with the forward section about 5 kilometres (3.1 mi; 2.7 nmi) from the tail, indicating that the aircraft had disintegrated during flight. Aerial images of the wreckage broadcast on RT indicated that the wings were intact until impact. The debris pattern, combined with an initial interpretation of the aircraft's abrupt changes in altitude and airspeed, reinforced the presumption that the tail separated during flight and fell separately.

=== Response ===
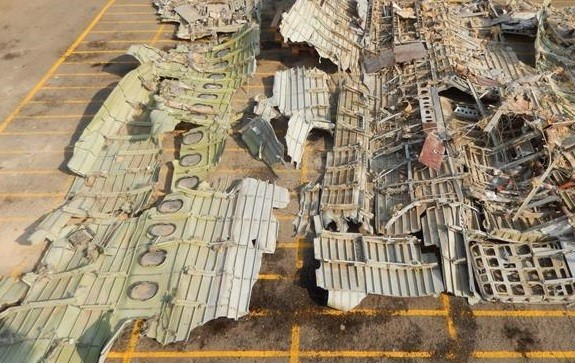
Other parts of the wreckage of Flight 9268

Egyptian authorities reached the wreckage site within hours. Fifty ambulances were sent to the crash site near Housna, 300 kilometres (190 mi; 160 nmi) from Sharm El Sheikh. Unnamed Egyptian officials reported that the aircraft split in two and that most bodies were found strapped to their seats. Initial reports indicated that voices of trapped passengers could be heard in a section of the crash. The Egyptian search-and-rescue team had found 163 bodies by 1 November. As the search area widened, the Egyptian team found the body of a child about 8 kilometres (5 mi; 4 nmi) from the wreckage, indicating that the aircraft had disintegrated in mid-air.

== Investigation ==
Ayman al-Muqaddam, the head of the central air traffic accident authority in Egypt, was appointed to investigate the cause of the crash. In a statement on 31 October, he indicated that the pilot had made contact with the civil aviation authorities and asked to land at the nearest airport. He suggested the aircraft may have been attempting an emergency landing at El Arish International Airport in northern Sinai. On the same day, Egyptian civil-aviation minister Hossam Kamel said that air-traffic control recordings did not reveal any distress calls or route-change requests issued by the pilots. Egyptian president Abdel Fattah el-Sisi said that an investigation would take months. On 31 October, the International Charter on Space and Major Disasters was activated, providing for the humanitarian retasking of satellite assets.

The Russian Ministry of Emergency Situations sent three of its aircraft to the crash site. The Investigative Committee of Russia also started a legal case against Kogalymavia under legislation regulating "violation of rules of flights and preparations". Kogalymavia's employees were also questioned, along with those of the Brisco tour agency that had chartered the flight. Egyptian foreign minister Sameh Shoukry promised to work closely with Russian officials and investigators. Investigators also viewed security-camera footage. Soon after the crash, Russia's regional transport prosecutors determined that the quality of fuel on the aircraft met required standards.

The aviation accident investigation agencies BEA (France), BFU (Germany) and AAIU (Ireland) participated in the investigation as representatives for the state of the aircraft's design, manufacture and registration respectively. The BEA sent two investigators, accompanied by six representatives from Airbus, to Egypt on 1 November. According to the BEA, they joined two investigators from the BFU and four investigators from the Interstate Aviation Committee, their Russian counterpart, representing the state of the aircraft's operator.

Both the flight data recorder and the cockpit voice recorder were recovered from the crash site on 1 November. Russian transport minister Maksim Sokolov and a team of specialist investigators arrived in Cairo to assist the Egyptian investigators. On 4 November, Egypt's civil-aviation ministry investigators reported that the cockpit voice recorder (CVR) was partially damaged and that much work was required to extract data from it. The CVR indicated that everything was normal until a sudden disastrous event. An explosion or other sudden loud noise was heard very shortly before the device stopped recording.

An unnamed official said that Flight 9268's tail section separated from the main body of the fuselage and was burning, which could indicate an explosion. According to a senior U.S. defence official, an American infrared satellite detected a heat flash at the time and place of the disaster, and the American intelligence community believed that it could have been an explosion. U.S. director of national intelligence James Clapper said that there was not yet any "direct evidence of terrorist involvement". Some UK news outlets reported that an ISIL bomb was the most likely explanation.

Within a week of the crash, authorities began to believe that the plane was destroyed intentionally. The UK government said that in the light of further British intelligence, the crash "may well have been caused by an explosive device". British aviation experts travelled to Egypt to assess airport security, and the government's Cobra emergency committee, chaired by the prime minister, considered their findings. The BBC reported that the British government thought that the incident was probably caused by a bomb in the hold based on intercepted transmissions between militants based in Sinai. Although the British did not exclude a technical fault, the BBC reported that was "increasingly unlikely".

The United Kingdom stopped flights from and to Sharm El Sheikh, causing a number of British tourists to be stranded. Prime minister David Cameron's spokesperson communicated that the government believed the aircraft was destroyed by a bomb. Security experts and investigators have said the aircraft is unlikely to have been struck from the outside and Sinai militants are not believed to have missiles capable of striking an airliner at 30,000 ft (9,100 m).

The cockpit voice recorder was sent to France, where its contents were downloaded by the BEA. The recording ends abruptly, consistent with an explosion on board. Reuters quoted an unnamed Egyptian investigation team member who was "90% sure" that the airliner was destroyed by a bomb, based on an initial analysis of the last second of the CVR recording. Lead investigator Ayman al-Muqaddam said that other causes, such as lithium batteries overheating, a fuel explosion or metal fatigue, had not yet been definitively excluded.

On 17 November 2015, Russian security service chief Alexander Bortnikov announced that explosives were found in the wreckage. Spectral analysis was employed to examine the substances. According to Russian officials, an improvised explosive device with power equivalent of as much as one kilogram of TNT destroyed the plane. Russia offered a US$50 million reward for further information. Reuters reported that two employees of Sharm El Sheikh airport had been detained for questioning, which Egyptian authorities denied.

On 18 November 2015, ISIL published pictures of what it claimed to be the type of bomb used in the explosion in its Dabiq online magazine, claiming to show the three IED components, including a Schweppes soda can containing the explosive charge, a military-grade detonator and switch. That same month, Russian defence minister Sergei Shoigu announced that the Sinai branch of ISIL was responsible.

On 14 December 2015, the Egyptian investigators issued a preliminary report. The leader of the committee said that it had found "no evidence that there is an act of terror or illegal intervention". In response to the statement by the investigating committee, Russian spokesman Dmitry Peskov reiterated that "our experts concluded this was a terrorist attack".

On 29 January 2016, Reuters reported that a mechanic was detained and suspected of planting the bomb, which he had been given by his cousin, a member of IS. Two policemen and a baggage handler suspected of helping the mechanic were also detained. None of the four had yet been prosecuted.

On 24 February 2016, Egyptian president Abdel Fattah el-Sisi acknowledged that terrorism caused the crash, saying, "Has terrorism ended? No... Whoever downed that plane, what did he want? Just to hit tourism? No. To hit relations. To hit relations with Russia."

Abu Osama al-Masri, leader of the Islamic State branch in the Sinai Peninsula, known as Wilayat Sinai, became a person of interest but was killed in June 2018 in an airstrike on an IS location.

=== Other hypotheses ===
==== Tailstrike and maintenance hypotheses ====
Airline officials excluded mechanical failure as the cause, but investigators did not reach the same determination. Natalya Trukhacheva, the ex-wife of copilot Sergei Trukhachev, said that her ex-husband had complained to their daughter about the aircraft's technical state.

The aircraft involved in the crash had suffered a tailstrike while landing in Cairo 14 years earlier. Some have drawn comparisons to Japan Air Lines Flight 123, which crashed into a mountain in 1985, seven years after the aircraft had suffered a tailstrike while landing. The tail section was improperly repaired, leaving the rear pressure bulkhead vulnerable to metal fatigue, which ultimately resulted in explosive decompression. Reports on the wreckage of Flight 9268 have suggested that a "clear break" occurred near the plane's rear pressure bulkhead, possibly indicating failure of the bulkhead.

On 2 November, Metrojet spokesman Alexander Smirnov insisted that the aircraft was 100% airworthy and that its crew was "very experienced", showing certificates that the airline had received in 2014, later adding that the tailstrike incident in Cairo had been fully repaired and the engines had been inspected on 26 October, five days before the crash.

==== Missile hypothesis ====
In a report by UK newspaper The Guardian, a missile attack was "deemed unlikely" but the report stated that several airlines would avoid flying over Sinai while the crash was under investigation. On 2 November, Metrojet spokesman Alexander Smirnov excluded technical fault and pilot error as the cause of the crash and blamed an "external force". ISIL's Wilayah Sinai said the incident was revenge for Russian air strikes against militants in Syria, where IS controls territories along with contiguous Iraqi territories. Wilayah Sinai was said to not have access to surface-to-air missiles capable of hitting an aircraft at high altitude, as man-portable air-defence systems (MANPADS) can rarely reach even half the cruising altitude of an airliner, but analysts could not exclude the possibility of a bomb.

Russian transport minister Maksim Sokolov dismissed the claims as "fabrications" because of a lack of evidence from Egyptian civil aviation, security officials and air-traffic data. James Clapper, U.S. Director of National Intelligence, said on 2 November that there was no evidence yet of terrorist involvement but that he would not exclude it as the cause. On the same day, a source on the committee analysing the flight recorders said that he believed that the aircraft was not struck from the outside and that the pilot did not issue a distress signal before the plane disappeared from radar. He based his comments on the preliminary investigation of both flight recorders.

== Disruption to air traffic ==
All flights due to leave Sharm El Sheikh for Britain were delayed as a "precautionary measure" to allow experts to assess security. Emirates, Lufthansa and Air France–KLM announced that they would avoid flying over the Sinai peninsula until the cause of the accident has been determined. The United States' Federal Aviation Administration had previously instructed carriers under its jurisdiction to operate above FL260 (26,000 feet [7,900 m]) while flying over Sinai, as had Germany's Luftfahrt-Bundesamt. Air Arabia, Flydubai and British Airways also stopped their flights over the Sinai Peninsula in response to the crash. EasyJet initially stated that it would not halt its flights to and from Sharm El Sheikh and Hurghada, but would actively review them, and passengers who opted not to fly the route would be rebooked on another flight or awarded a flight voucher.

On 4 November, the British Foreign and Commonwealth Office changed its travel advice to warn against all but essential travel by air to Sharm El Sheikh. As a result, all British flights to and from the resort were cancelled from 4 November. On the same day, the Irish Aviation Authority issued an order to all Irish airline operators not to operate to or from Sharm el‐Sheikh or fly over the Sinai Peninsula until further notice. The decisions on 4 November by the British and Irish authorities to ground flights to and from Sharm El Sheikh came within minutes of each other. Patrick McLoughlin, UK Secretary of State for Transport, told Parliament that Ireland had investigators from the Air Accident Investigation Unit in Egypt reporting back to the Irish government, and that the British and Irish governments have close security cooperation.

On the morning of 5 November, Air France-KLM announced that it would not allow checked baggage on its flight from Cairo that day, and more than half of the booked passengers refused to fly. There were an estimated 20,000 British citizens in Sharm El Sheikh on 5 November, almost half of whom were on holiday and stranded by the cancellation of flights. Flights to the UK were allowed again from 6 November, to enable people to travel home, but with restrictions and increased security measures. Passengers were permitted to travel home with only hand luggage, with checked baggage to be returned following a more stringent screening process. British officials at the airport provided extra security and approved aircraft as safe to travel.

Russian president Vladimir Putin announced on 6 November that all Russian flights to and from Egypt were cancelled. Most British airlines serving the resort sent repatriation flights to return stranded British tourists back to the United Kingdom. On the afternoon of 6 November, Egyptian authorities placed restrictions on the number of flights because of overcrowding in the terminals. As a result, only eight of the planned 29 repatriation flights were able to leave that day, with various flights forced to divert or return to the UK whilst in the air.

By 8 November about 11,000 Russian tourists and about 5,300 British tourists had been flown back from the resort.

On 9 November, British airlines announced that all flights to the resort had been cancelled until at least 25 November. The British government and head of the airline Emirates stated that airport security throughout the Middle East could be significantly overhauled as a result of the bombing. By 15 November, 16,000 British tourists had been flown back from the resort since the suspension of flights.

== Aftermath ==
On November 6, Russia banned flights to Egypt. President Putin said that the main condition for the resumption of flights was to ensure safety.

In March 2016, Metrojet filed for bankruptcy as a result of the bombing of Flight 9268 and the security situation in Egypt, both of which resulted in a fall in passenger numbers.

In April 2018, Aeroflot and EgyptAir resumed flights between Moscow and Cairo, and flights between Russia and other Egyptian destinations restarted in August 2021.

Airports around the world tightened the security vetting for staff. About 70 employees lost their clearance to work in secure zones of Paris's Orly and Charles de Gaulle airports because of suspected extremist links.

== International reactions ==
=== Russia ===
On 1 November 2015, the Russian government grounded all A321 aircraft flown by Kogalymavia. The Russian transport regulator Rostransnadzor requested that Kogalymavia stop flying its A321 aircraft until the cause of the crash had been identified.

Maria Zakharova, a spokeswoman for the Russian foreign ministry, stated that the Russian embassy was following the events. President Putin declared 1 November a national day of mourning in Russia.

Dmitry Kiselyov, a Soviet and Russian journalist, blamed the crash on an alleged secret pact between the U.S. and ISIL.

Representatives of the Russian government initially claimed that "there is not the slightest evidence" for a terrorist attack and denied any links between the crash and Russian intervention in Syria. On 17 November, Russia's security chief said that the attack was an act of terror, and the Russian government offered a US$50 million reward for information leading to the arrest of the perpetrators.

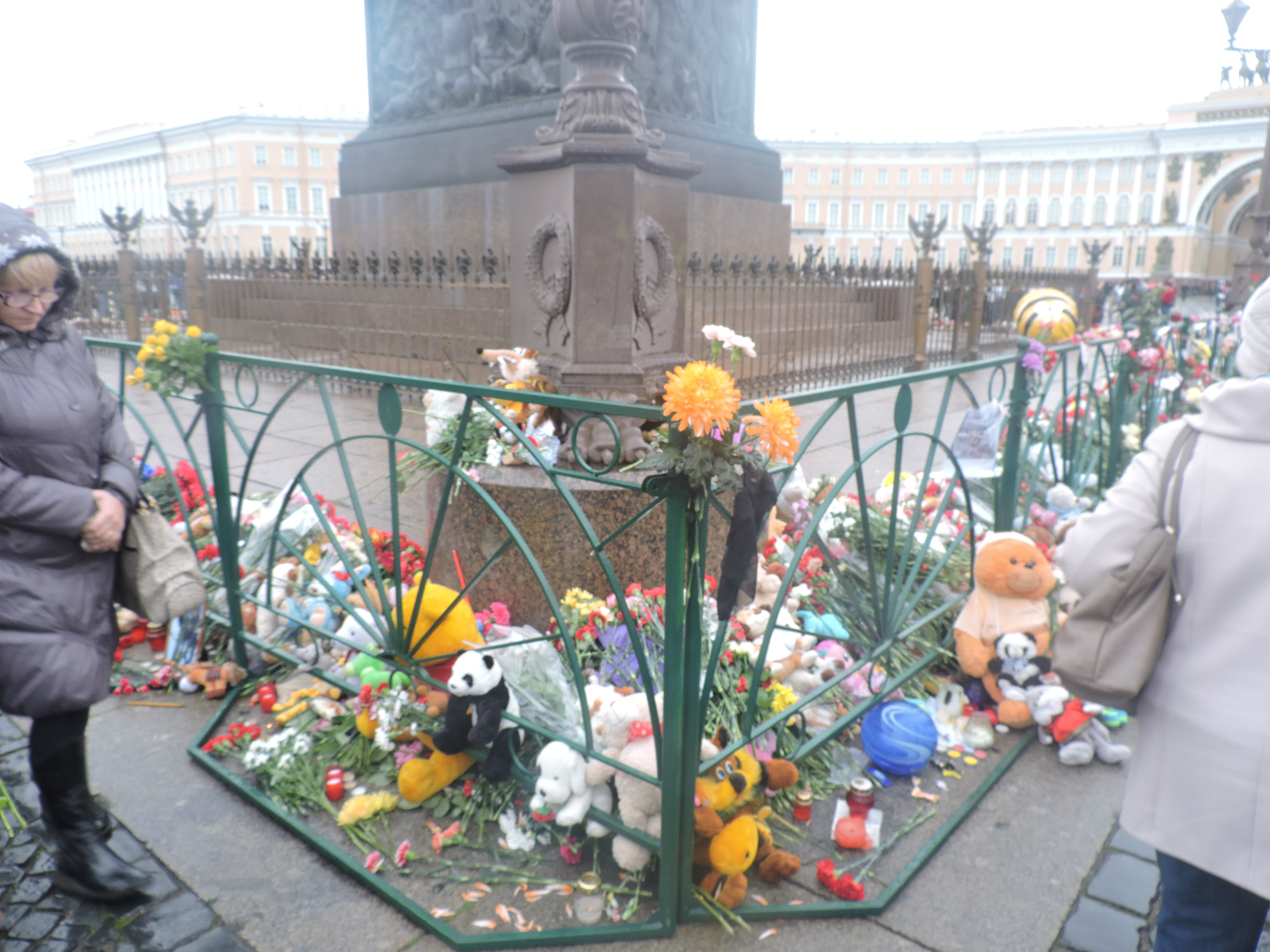
People place flowers and children's toys on the Palace Square, Saint Petersburg, 4 November 2015

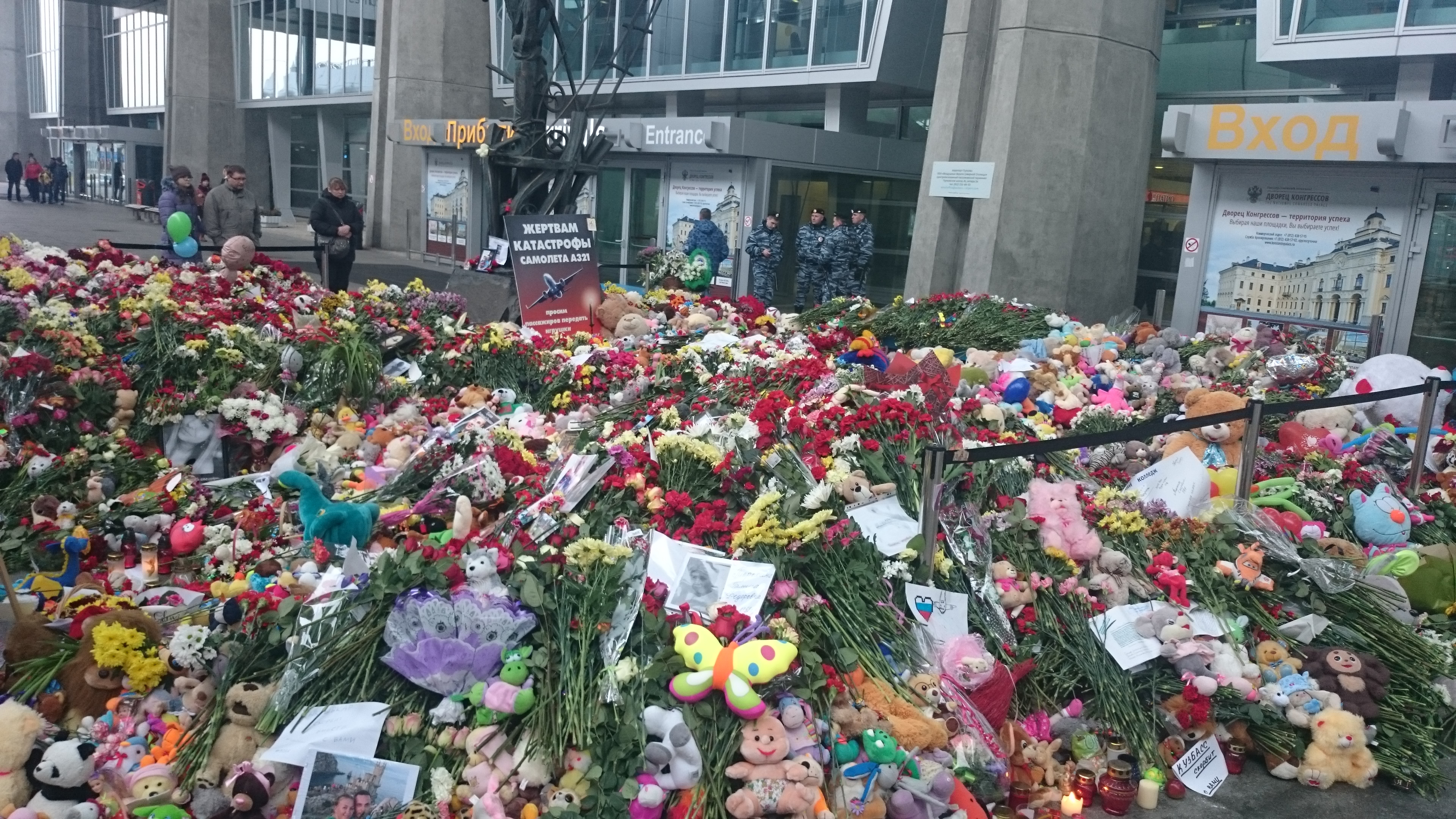
Flowers and children's toys at the Pulkovo Airport entrance. The sign at the back says "To the victims of A321 plane crash".

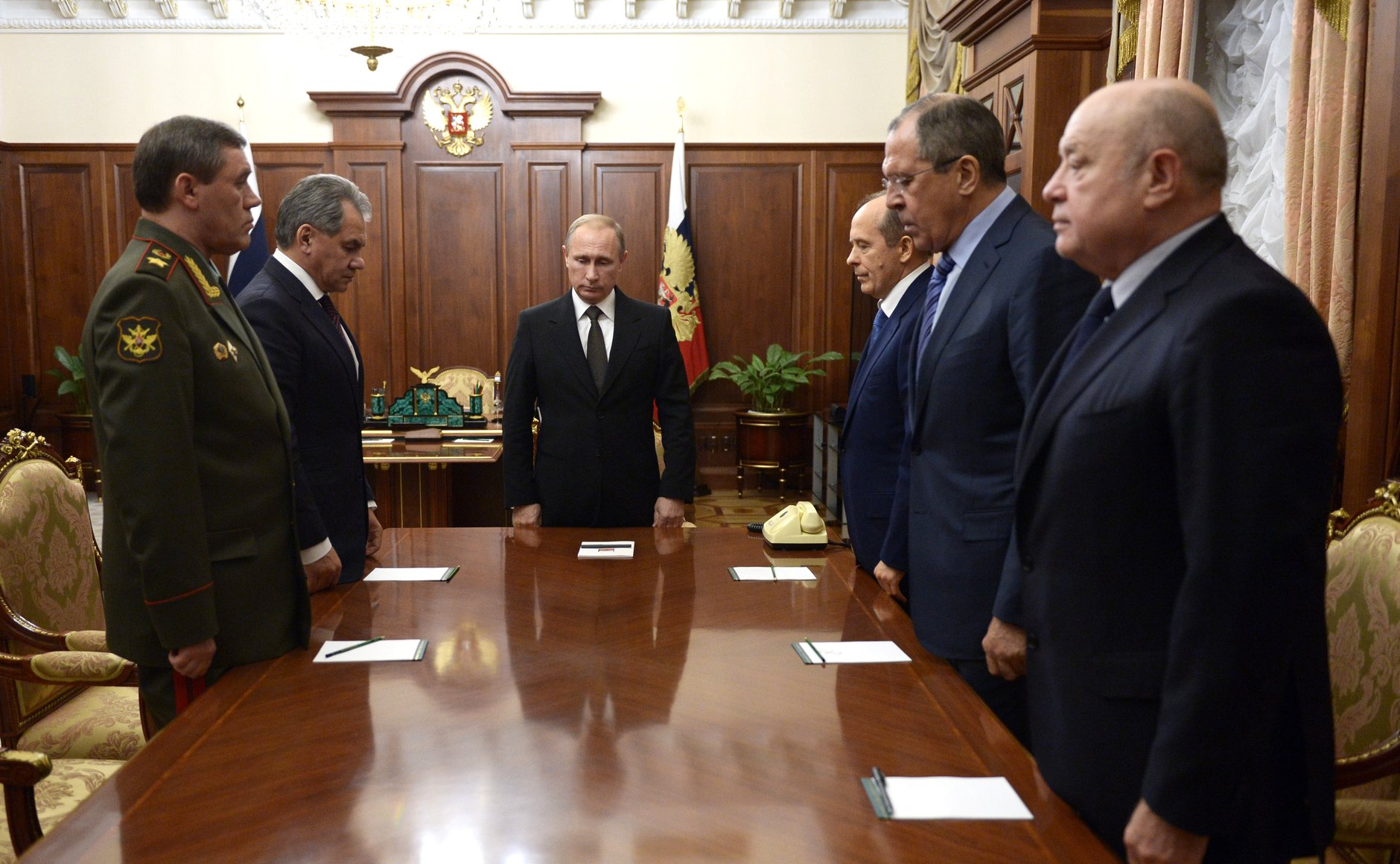
Russian president Vladimir Putin attending a meeting of investigators of the crash

=== Egypt ===
Hours after the crash, Egyptian prime minister Sherif Ismail visited the crash site, along with other ministers, on a private jet.

=== Ireland ===
The Republic of Ireland, as the state of aircraft registry, sent representatives from the Irish Air Accident Investigation Unit (AAIU) of the Department of Transport, Tourism and Sport, including an operations/pilot inspector, an engineering inspector and a regulatory/operations adviser from the Irish Aviation Authority (IAA). The team flew on an Irish military aircraft on 2 November.

=== Israel ===
Israel, which borders the Sinai peninsula, offered to assist Russia and Egypt with surveillance if needed.

=== Ukraine ===
During a trade visit to Cairo in April 2018, Ukrainian foreign minister Pavlo Klimkin discussed the bombing and its effects.

=== United Kingdom ===
On 4 November, British intelligence agencies became involved in the investigation. The UK government sent extra consular staff and several military planners to Egypt. Egyptian president al-Sisi met British prime minister Cameron in London. At a joint press conference with Cameron, President Sisi said that Egypt would cooperate on improved security measures at Sharm El Sheikh airport. Cameron and Russian president Putin also discussed the investigation into the crash. On 5 November, the government sent diplomatic staff, including British embassy staff and FCO rapid-deployment teams, to Sharm El Sheikh airport to help British nationals return home.

Less than a week after the crash, the UK banned flights into Sharm El-Sheikh airport, and the restriction lasted until October 2019. The UK government also advised against "all but essential" travel to the South Sinai "with the exception of the area within the Sharm el Sheikh perimeter barrier, which includes the airport and the areas of Sharm el Maya, Hadaba, Naama Bay, Sharks Bay and Nabq".

=== United States ===
U.S. president Barack Obama stated on 5 November that the American government was taking the incident "very seriously", knowing there was a possibility that there had been a bomb on board the flight.

=== Charlie Hebdo ===
On 6 November, the French satirical weekly magazine Charlie Hebdo published cartoons referring to the tragedy, one with pieces of an aircraft falling on an ISIL fighter with the caption: "Russia's air force intensifies its bombing". The cartoon was considered offensive in Russia and a spokesman for president Vladimir Putin called the artwork "sacrilege", and members of the State Duma called for the magazine to be banned as extremist literature and demanded an apology from the French government.

== Lawsuits ==
In Autumn 2018, a Cairo court reviewed lawsuits filed by relatives of victims of the crash who were seeking compensation from Russian companies and the Egyptian government. The plaintiffs accused officials of negligence that allowed the bomb to be brought on board. Each of the 30 families demanded $3 million. The court confirmed Egyptian jurisdiction under international aviation conventions but rejected claims against the government, citing the involvement of "third parties". Lawsuits against the airline and insurer were also dismissed because of a lack of proof that the victims were aboard the plane or that the plaintiffs were their relatives.

The appeals court combined all claims into one case and recognized procedural violations in the initial ruling, but rejected the suits on the same grounds. Later proceedings were delayed by the COVID-19 pandemic. When hearings resumed, the court fined the victims’ Egyptian lawyers $500 for failing to provide a government investigation report, although the authorities had refused to release it.

In early 2021, one of the claims against the Egyptian government was remanded for reconsideration, which lawyers described as a small but important breakthrough. The case was among more than one hundred similar cases filed by victims’ families.

By 2022, hearings continued against both the Egyptian government and the Russian companies. The insurer disputed the victims’ identities and family ties despite having previously paid insurance under Russian law. The court agreed to summon the airline as a witness. Lawyers also held preliminary talks with Egyptian officials on possible settlements, indicating that they were ready to accept smaller compensations than originally demanded.

As of 2025, relatives of the victims have not received compensation from Egypt. The cassation court in Egypt ruled that the claims of the families must be reconsidered, as previous lawsuits seeking compensation from the airline, insurer and Egyptian authorities were repeatedly denied or delayed.

== See also ==
- Accidents and incidents involving the Airbus A320 family
- List of accidents and incidents involving commercial aircraft
- List of massacres in Egypt
- Timeline of airliner bombing attacks
