= Metrojet (Russian airline) =

Airline

Kogalymavia Авиакомпания Когалымавиа d.b.a. Metrojet

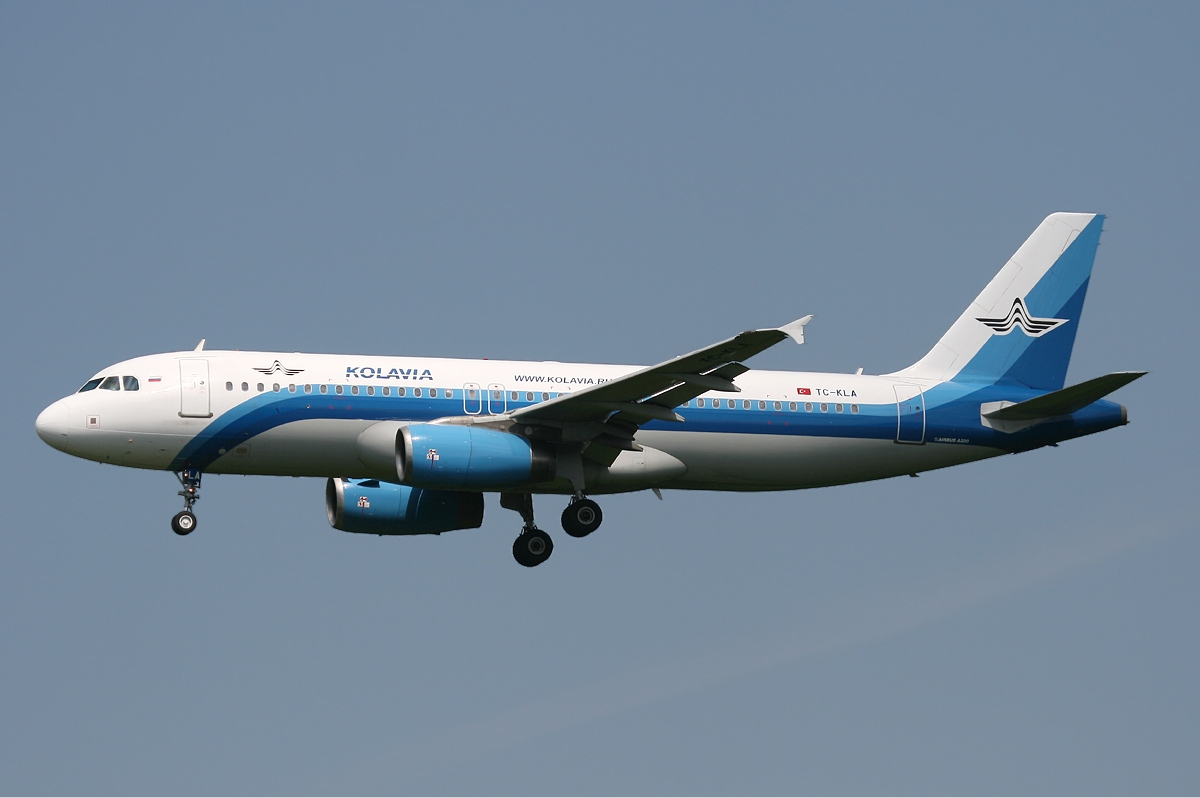
- Airbus A320 before the rebrand to Metrojet.
IATA	ICAO	Call sign
7K	KGL	KOGALYM
- Founded: 1993 (as Kolavia); 2012 (rebranded to Metrojet)
- Ceased operations: 2016
- Hubs: Domodedovo International Airport
- Secondary hubs: Kogalym International Airport; Pulkovo Airport
- Focus cities: Vladivostok International Airport
- Fleet size: 2
- Destinations: 16
- Key people: Nikolai Nikolayevich Zolnikov, General Director
- Website: metrojet.ru

Kogalymavia (Russian: ООО «Авиакомпания Когалымавиа»), DBA Metrojet (IATA: 7K, ICAO: KGL), was a Russian airline based in Kogalym, Khanty-Mansi Autonomous Okrug. Its home base was at Kogalym International Airport, with the main hub at Domodedovo International Airport in Moscow. It suspended all operations in December 2015, two months after the terrorist attack on Flight 9268.

== History ==
Former Metrojet logo

Kogalymavia started operations in May 1993. After 2005, the airline operated mostly international charter services to leisure destinations, under the brand name Kolavia.

In May 2012, Kogalymavia changed its marketing branding from Kolavia to Metrojet, as part of its newly-established joint venture with TUI Russia & CIS, a subsidiary of the German tourism company TUI Travel. Up until August 2014, when the joint-venture was terminated, Metrojet operated on behalf of TUI, and flew independently from then on.

In 2011, one of its planes caught fire, resulting in 3 fatalities and 32 additional injured. On 5 December 2015, shortly after the terrorist attack on Flight 9268, Metrojet suspended all remaining operations after a significant decrease in passenger numbers and doubts about the security situation at its primary leisure destinations in Egypt. It announced a review of all operations and said it might resume services in summer 2016. However, it filed for bankruptcy in March 2016.

== Destinations ==
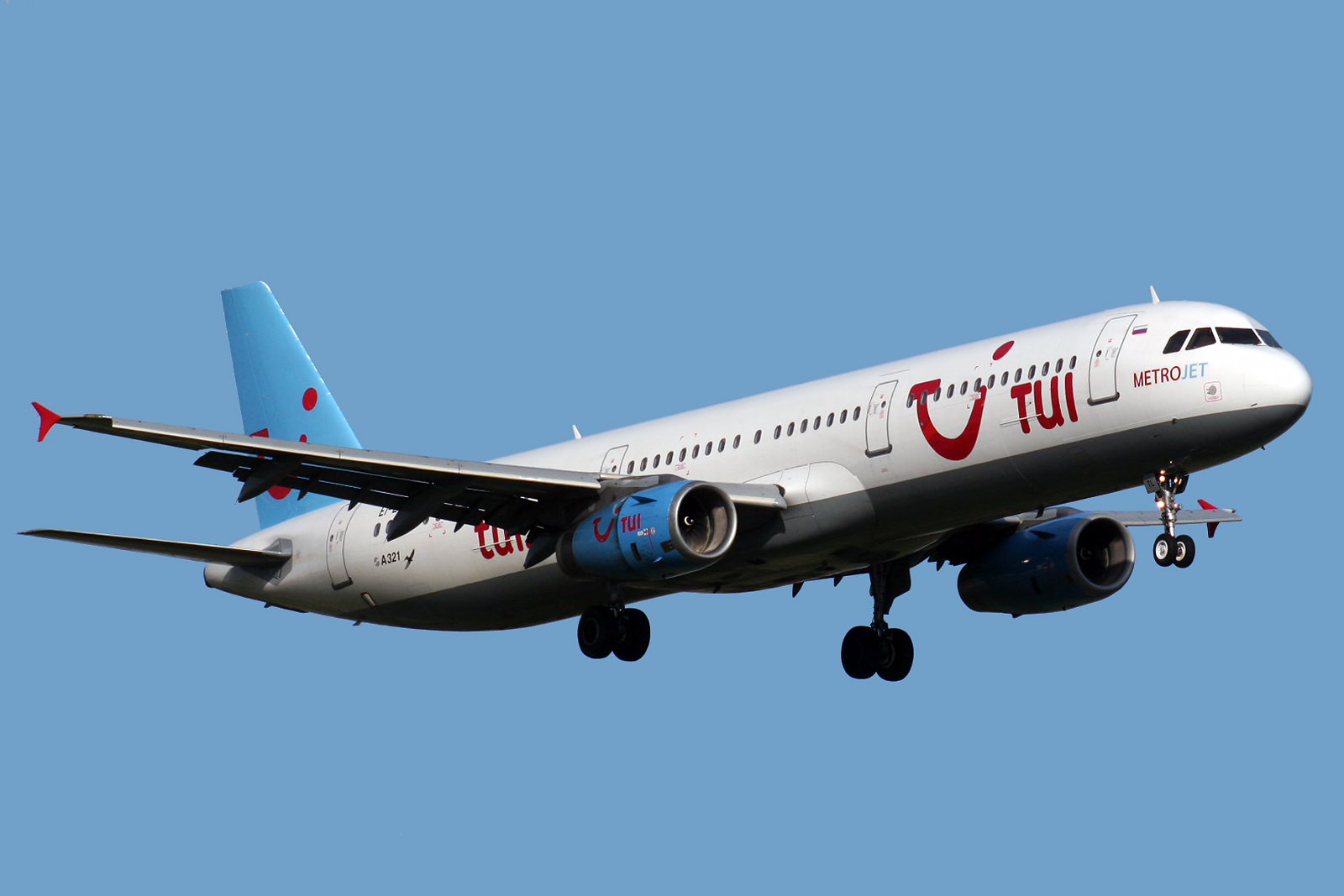
Metrojet Airbus A321-200 in its former TUI Travel livery

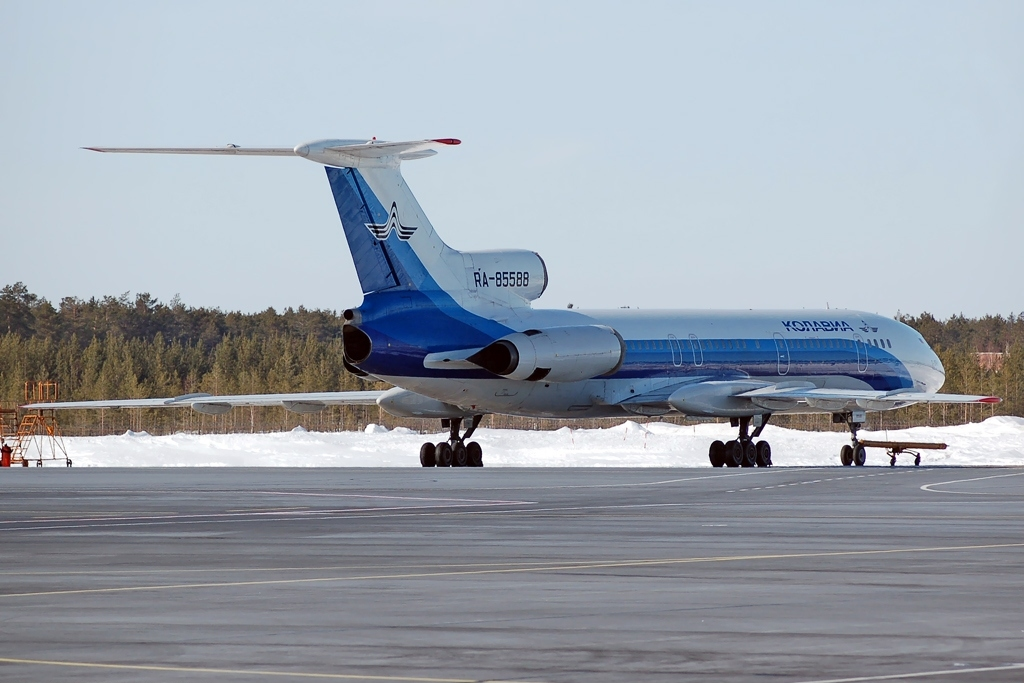
A former Kolavia Tupolev Tu-154B

Metrojet operated the following routes by the time it ceased operations:

from Moscow-Domodedovo

- Austria (Salzburg)
- Azerbaijan (Qabala)
- Bulgaria (Burgas, Varna)
- Croatia (Pula)
- Czech Republic (Pardubice)
- Denmark (Copenhagen)
- Egypt (Hurghada, Sharm el-Sheikh, Taba)
- Spain (Barcelona, Ibiza, Palma de Mallorca)
- France (Grenoble, Paris)
- Germany (Frankfurt, Munich)
- Greece (Rhodes, Heraklion)
- India (Hyderabad, New Delhi, Mumbai)
- Italy (Treviso, Rimini, Rome)
- Montenegro (Tivat)
- Norway (Oslo)
- Pakistan (Karachi)
- Philippines (Manila)
- Qatar (Doha)
- Saudi Arabia (Jeddah, Riyadh)
- Sweden (Stockholm)
- Switzerland (Geneva, Zurich)
- Tunisia (Enfidha)
- Turkey (Antalya, Bodrum, Dalaman)
- United Arab Emirates (Dubai)
- United Kingdom (London)
- United States (Chicago, New York City)

from Vladivostok

- Japan (Tokyo, Osaka, Sapporo)
- South Korea (Seoul)
- Vietnam (Da Nang)

== Fleet ==
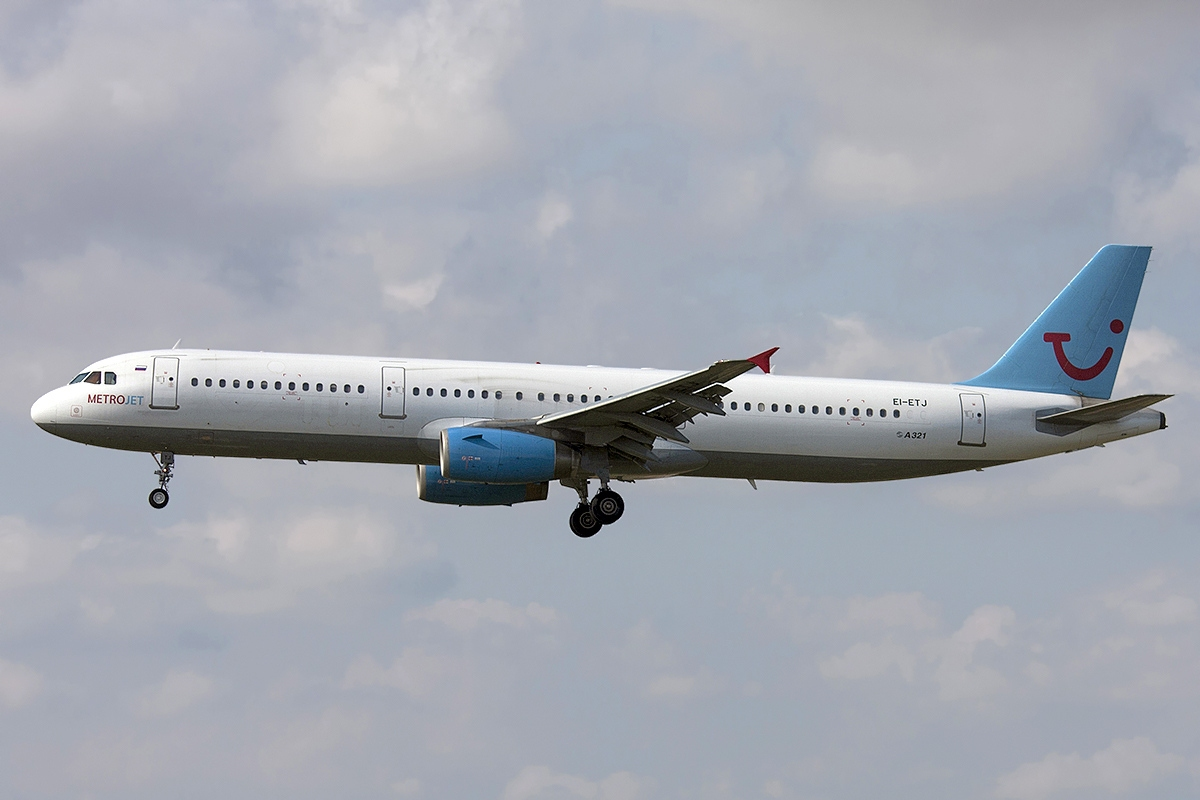
A Kogalymavia Airbus A321-200, operating as MetroJet in its former TUI Travel livery, seen on approach to Kansai International Airport in October 2013. Two years later, this airframe was destroyed in the crash of Flight 9268.

The Kogalymavia fleet included the following aircraft, as of August 2016:

Metrojet fleet
Aircraft	In Service	Orders	Passengers		Notes
Aircraft	In Service	Orders	Y	Total	Notes
Airbus A321-200	2	—	219; 220	219; 220	All stored
Total	2	—			

=== Retired fleet ===
Metrojet and its predecessor Kolavia also operated the following aircraft in the past:

- 2 Airbus A320-200
- Antonov An-24
- Tupolev Tu-134
- Tupolev Tu-154B
- Tupolev Tu-154M
- 5 Airbus A321-200 (4 sold, one crashed)

== Accidents and incidents ==
- 1 January 2011: Flight 348. A fire broke out on one of the engines of a Tupolev Tu-154B-2, tail number RA-85588, before taxiing. The aircraft had 116 passengers and 8 crew on board, and was due to operate a flight, a Surgut–Moscow service. It was evacuated seconds before the flames engulfed the fuselage. Three people were killed and 43 passengers injured.
- 31 October 2015: Flight 9268, an Airbus A321-200 charter flight with 224 people on board, en route from Sharm el-Sheikh to Saint Petersburg, crashed on the Sinai Peninsula. All 217 passengers and seven crew members perished. The Russian Federal Security Service announced on 17 November that it was a terrorist attack, caused by an improvised bomb containing the equivalent of up to 1 kilogram (2.2 lb) of TNT that detonated during the flight. The Russians said they had found explosive residue as evidence. This air crash was named as the biggest and the most fatal in the history of the airline, Russian and Soviet aviation; and the Airbus A320 family's history.
- 5 November 2015: Flight 9267 suffered a collapse of its nose gear following an incident during pushback at Saint Petersburg Airport in Russia. The flight was operated by EI-ETL, an Airbus A321-200.
