= Kogalym International Airport =

Airport in Kogalym, Russia

Kogalym Airport
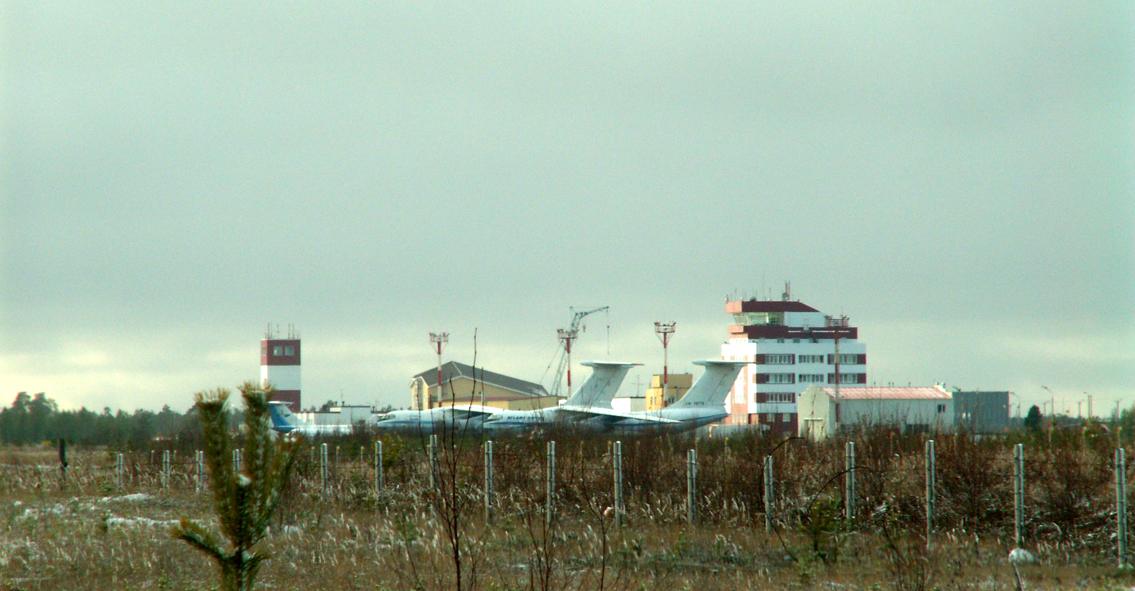
- IATA: KGP; ICAO: USRK

Summary
- Airport type: Public
- Operator: Kolavia
- Serves: Kogalym
- Location: Kogalym, Russia
- Hub for: Metrojet
- Elevation AMSL: 220 ft / 67 m
- Coordinates: 62°11′24″N 74°32′6″E
- Website: kogalymavia.ru

Map
- Location of airport in Khanty-Mansi Autonomous Okrug KGP (Russia)

Runways
Direction	Length		Surface
Direction	ft	m	Surface
17/35	8,225	2,507	Concrete

Kogalym Airport (Russian: Аэропорт Когалым) (IATA: KGP, ICAO: USRK) is an airport in Khanty-Mansi Autonomous Okrug, Russia located 9 km southeast of Kogalym. It accommodates medium-sized airliners.

== History ==
After being state-owned by the Soviet union, the airport started to operate privately in 1991, and served as home base for the defunct airline Kogalymavia. In 1995, Kogalym Airport obtained its international status and served its first international flight (to Budapest) in 1996. In 1998, it became a member of the Airports Council International Europe.

== Airlines and destinations ==
Airlines	Destinations
Utair	Moscow–Vnukovo, Perm, Tyumen
Yamal Airlines	Yekaterinburg

== See also ==
- List of airports in Russia
