= Ural Airlines Flight 1383 =

2023 aviation incident in Russia

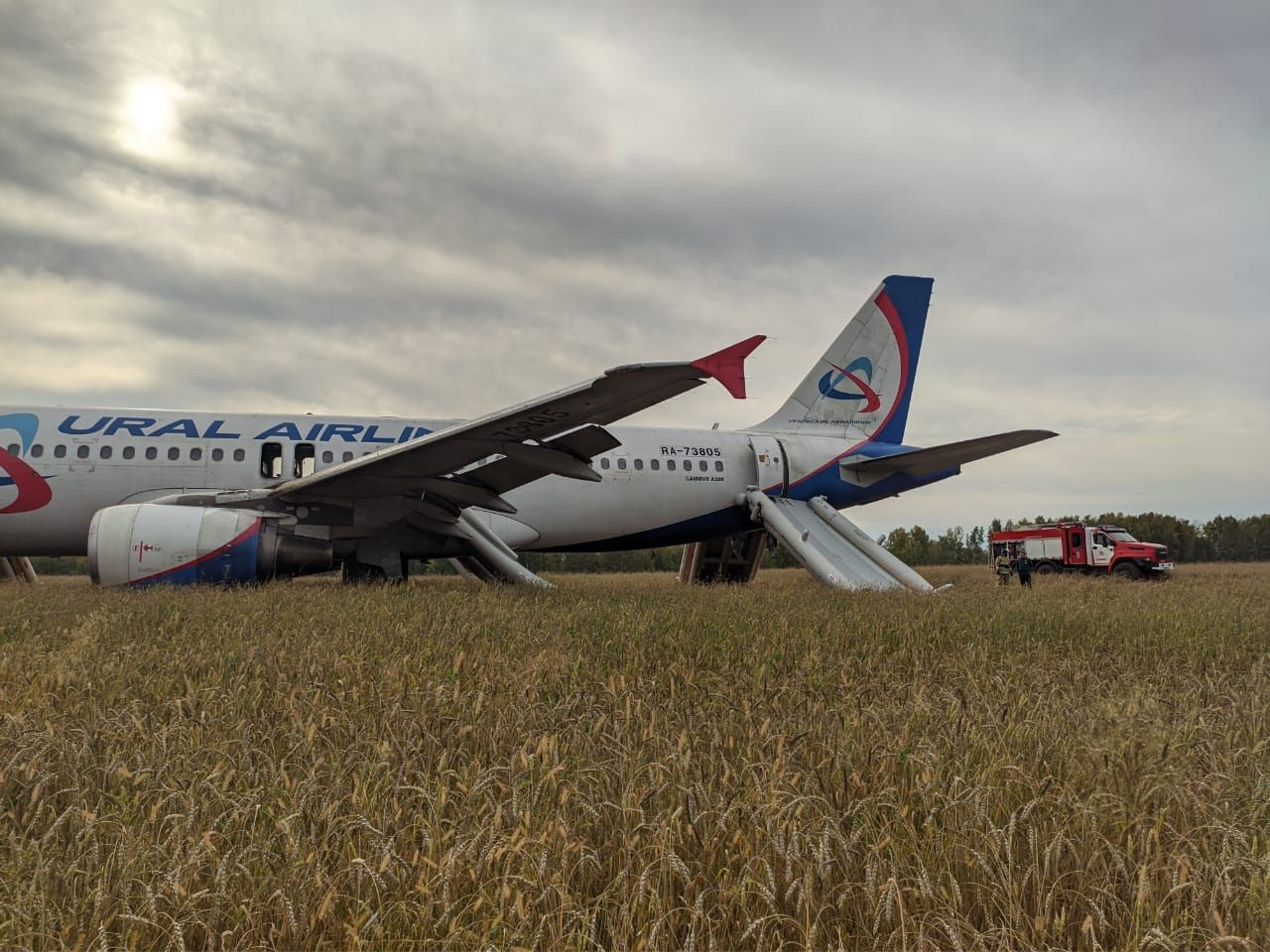
- The aircraft after making an emergency landing in a wheat field

Incident
- Date: 12 September 2023
- Summary: Emergency landing in a wheat field
- Site: Near Kamenka, Ubinsky District, Novosibirsk Oblast, Russia; 55°14′11.0″N 79°45′28.8″E

Aircraft
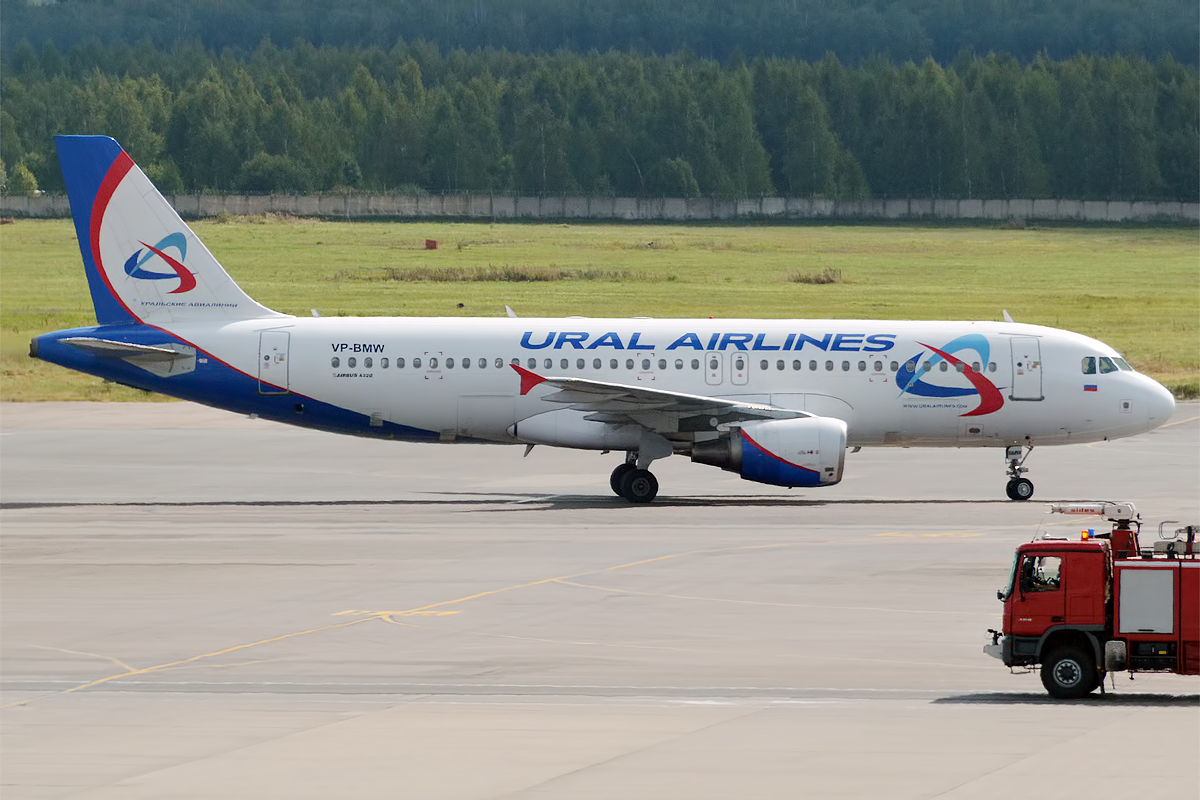
- The aircraft involved in the incident, seen in 2015 with a previous registration
- Aircraft type: Airbus A320-214
- Operator: Ural Airlines
- Call sign: SVERDLOVSK AIR 1383
- Registration: RA-73805
- Flight origin: Sochi-Adler Airport, Sochi, Russia
- Destination: Omsk Airport, Omsk, Russia
- Occupants: 165
- Passengers: 159
- Crew: 6
- Fatalities: 0
- Survivors: 165

Ural Airlines Flight 1383 was a scheduled flight from Sochi/Adler to Omsk in Russia. On 12 September 2023, the Airbus A320 operating the flight and carrying 159 passengers and 6 crew made an emergency landing in a field. Everyone on board survived and no injuries were reported.

== Incident ==
While on its final approach to Omsk, the crew initiated a go-around and reported a hydraulic failure affecting the brakes. They diverted to Novosibirsk, which has longer runways (3,600 metres [11,800 ft] compared to Omsk's 2,500 metres [8,200 ft]). The distance between the two airports is about 600 km (370 mi). However, the landing gear door remained open due to the hydraulic failure, resulting in increased fuel consumption exacerbated by strong headwinds. Possibly unable to reach Novosibirsk, the crew selected an open field for an emergency landing. The aircraft landed near the village of Kamenka, about 180 km (110 mi) from Novosibirsk.

It was suggested that the incident occurred as a result of Russian airlines having difficulty providing their planes with spare parts due to international sanctions on Russia as a result of the Russian invasion of Ukraine. However, Ural Airlines denied using any non-certified spare parts.

Ural Airlines stated that the aircraft sustained minor damage but would "most likely be able to fly in the future" after repairs to the landing gear attachment points in particular. The engines ingested "a small quantity of soil" and some fan blades reportedly needed to be replaced.

== Aircraft ==
The aircraft involved was an Airbus A320-214, registered RA-73805 with serial number 2166. It was fitted with two CFM International CFM56-5B4/P turbofan engines.

== Investigation ==
The Federal Air Transport Agency has opened an investigation into the incident, while the Investigative Committee of Russia has opened a separate criminal investigation under Article 263 of the Criminal Code of Russia (violation of traffic safety rules and operation of air transport). Both pilots were suspended from flying until the investigation is finished.

== Fate of the aircraft ==
Shortly after the incident, Ural Airlines management announced their intention to have the aircraft take off from the field under its own power after a thorough inspection, but later reports in Russian media suggested that the plane was to be dismantled and used for parts.

In December 2023, Sergei Skuratov, director of Ural Airlines, stated that contrary to previous plans the plane would not be taking off from the field again, saying that this course of action would not make "economic sense".

Discussions then shifted to the possibility of dismantling the plane and transporting its parts to Novosibirsk Airport where it could be reassembled, but on 12 January, the airline decided to scrap the aircraft. The aircraft continues to rest in place, surrounded by a corrugated iron fence and watched by a private security company. According to Russian newspaper Komsomolskaya Pravda, Ural Airlines has paid around one million Rubles (c. US$11,315) for the use of the field until September 2024.

== Reaction ==
Prior to a meeting of the Eastern Economic Forum, Russian president Vladimir Putin praised the flight crew for their actions.

== See also ==
- Ural Airlines Flight 178 – Accident where an aircraft made an emergency landing in a cornfield soon after takeoff in 2019
