= Ubinskoye =

Rural locality in Novosibirsk Oblast, Russia

Ubinskoye Убинское
- Village
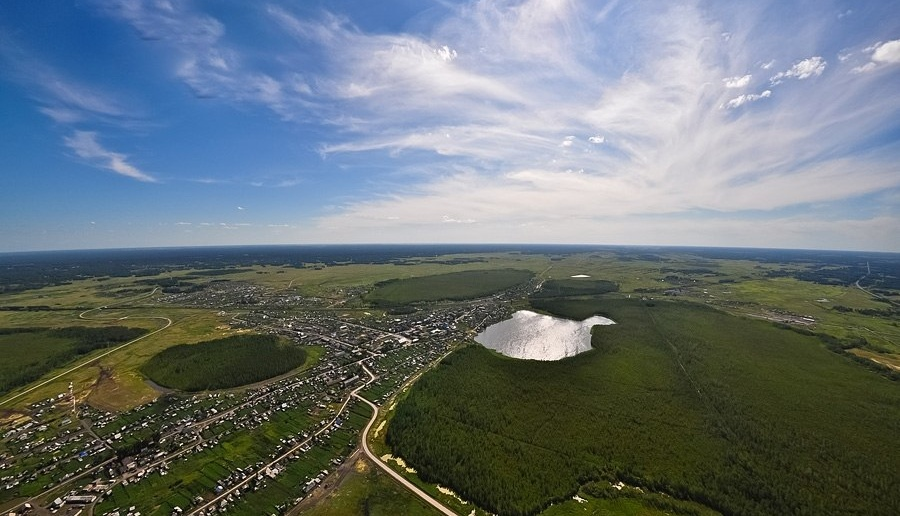

- Location within Novosibirsk Oblast Location within Russia
- Coordinates: 55°18′16″N 79°40′03″E
- Country: Russia
- Region: Novosibirsk Oblast
- District: Ubinsky District
- Time zone: UTC+7:00

Ubinskoye (Russian: Убинское) is a rural locality (a selo) and the administrative center of Ubinsky District, Novosibirsk Oblast, Russia. Population: 5,841 (2010 census); 5,958 (2002 census); 6,586 (1989 Soviet census).
