= Kogalym =

Kogalym Когалым
- Town
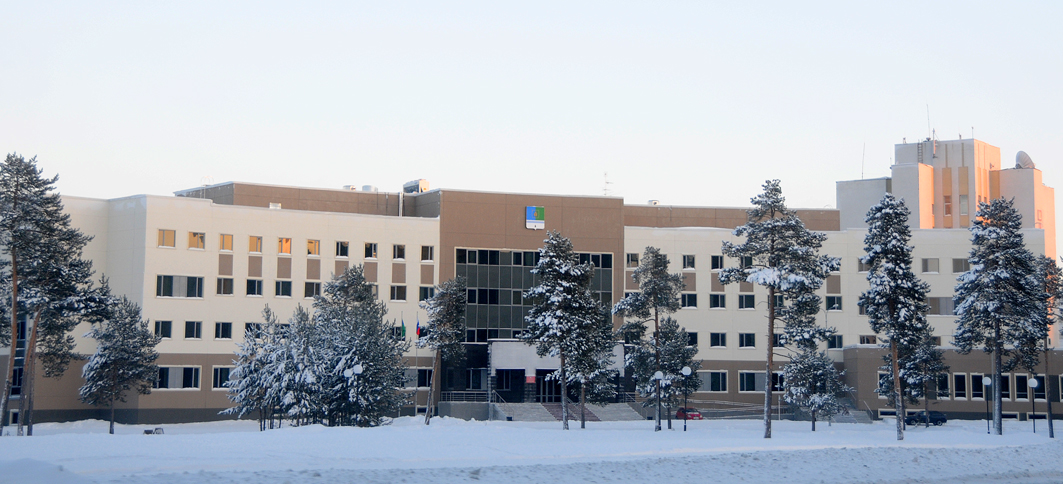
- Kogalym Town Administration building

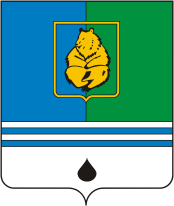
- Flag Coat of arms
- Interactive map of Kogalym
- Location of Kogalym Kogalym (Khanty–Mansi Autonomous Okrug)
- Coordinates: 62°16′N 74°29′E
- Country: Russia
- Federal subject: Khanty-Mansi Autonomous Okrug
- Founded: 1975
- Town status since: 15 August 1985
- Elevation: 80 m (260 ft)

Population (2010 Census)
  - Total: 58,181
  - Estimate (2021): 61,441 (+5.6%)
  - Rank: 285th in 2010

Administrative status
  - Subordinated to: town of okrug significance of Kogalym
  - Capital of: town of okrug significance of Kogalym

Municipal status
  - Urban okrug: Kogalym Urban Okrug
  - Capital of: Kogalym Urban Okrug
- Time zone: UTC+5 (MSK+2)
- Postal code: 628481
- OKTMO ID: 71883000001

Kogalym (Russian: Когалым; Khanty: Коголым, romanized: Kogolym) is a town in Khanty-Mansi Autonomous Okrug, Russia, located on the Inguyagun River 325 kilometres (202 mi) northeast of Khanty-Mansiysk. Population: 58,181 (2010 census); 55,367 (2002 census); 44,297 (1989 Soviet census).

== History ==
Kogalym was founded in 1975 because of the development of oil fields in its vicinity. It was granted town status on 15 August 1985.

== Administrative and municipal status ==
Within the framework of administrative divisions, it is, together with one rural locality, incorporated as the town of okrug significance of Kogalym—an administrative unit with the status equal to that of the districts. As a municipal division, the town of okrug significance of Kogalym is incorporated as Kogalym Urban Okrug.

== Economy ==
Kogalym's economy is entirely dominated by the oil industry. The headquarters of the main extraction subsidiary of Lukoil (OOO LUKOIL-Zapadnaya Sibir) is located in Kogalym.

=== Transport ===
The town is served by the Kogalym International Airport, a railway station, buses, and several taxi companies. There is little congestion, except during peak hours, while small traffic jams occur.

== Climate ==
Kogalym has a subarctic climate (Köppen climate classification Dfc). Because of the northern location, its winters are frigid, and its summers are cool. The temperature in January is typically −30 to −40 C (a low of −62 C was recorded at the Vatyogan oil field in 2006). The average wind speed is 3.1 metres per second, and the average humidity is 76.5%

Climate data for Kogalym
Month	Jan	Feb	Mar	Apr	May	Jun	Jul	Aug	Sep	Oct	Nov	Dec	Year
Mean daily maximum °C (°F)	−14.3 (6.3)	−13.0 (8.6)	−6.0 (21.2)	−1.2 (29.8)	7.6 (45.7)	16.4 (61.5)	20.6 (69.1)	16.5 (61.7)	8.4 (47.1)	0.4 (32.7)	−9.6 (14.7)	−13.5 (7.7)	1.0 (33.8)
Daily mean °C (°F)	−18.4 (−1.1)	−16.9 (1.6)	−10.5 (13.1)	−5.3 (22.5)	3.9 (39.0)	12.9 (55.2)	17.1 (62.8)	13.3 (55.9)	5.9 (42.6)	−2.0 (28.4)	−12.9 (8.8)	−17.5 (0.5)	−2.5 (27.4)
Mean daily minimum °C (°F)	−22.8 (−9.0)	−21.7 (−7.1)	−15.9 (3.4)	−10.8 (12.6)	−0.5 (31.1)	8.7 (47.7)	13.1 (55.6)	9.7 (49.5)	3.0 (37.4)	−4.8 (23.4)	−17.0 (1.4)	−21.7 (−7.1)	−6.7 (19.9)
