= Ubinsky District =

Ubinsky District Убинский район (Russian)
- District
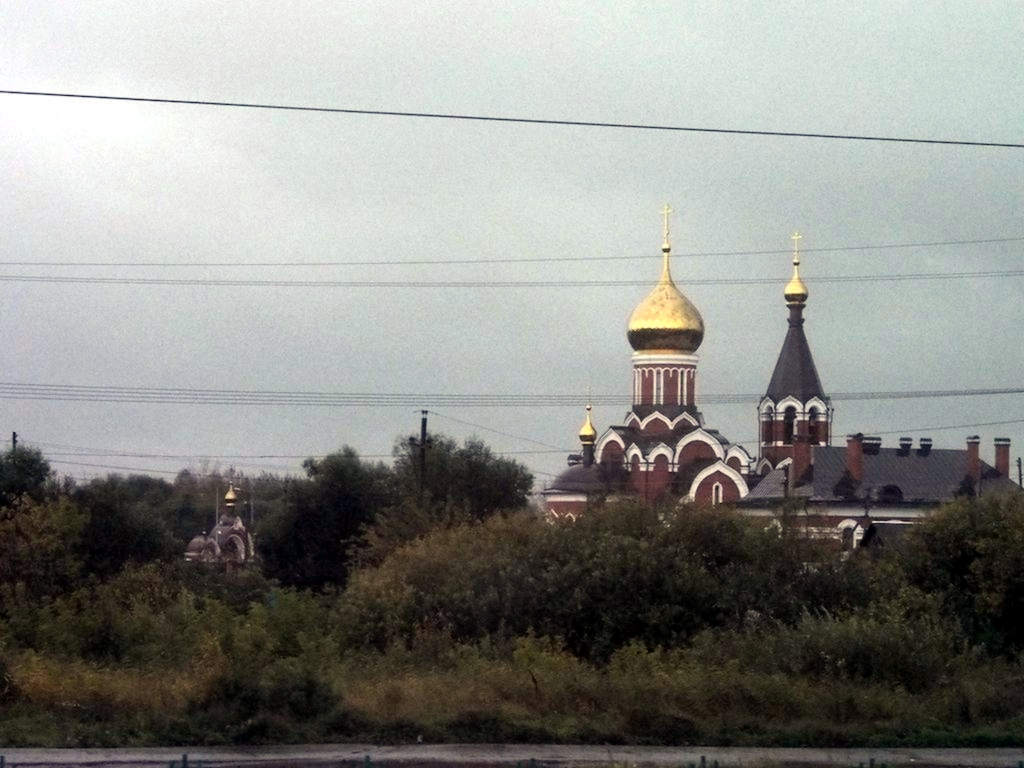
- Church in Ubinsky District

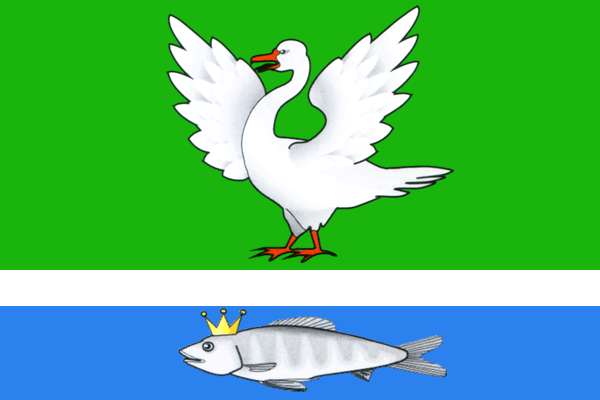
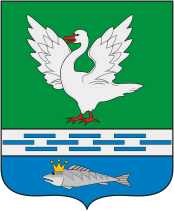
- Flag Coat of arms
- Location of Ubinsky District in Novosibirsk Oblast
- Coordinates: 55°18′N 79°41′E
- Country: Russia
- Federal subject: Novosibirsk Oblast
- Established: 1925
- Administrative center: Ubinskoye

Area
  - Total: 13,760 km^{2} (5,310 sq mi)

Population (2010 Census)
  - Total: 16,297
  - Density: 1.184/km^{2} (3.068/sq mi)
  - Urban: 0%
  - Rural: 100%

Administrative structure
  - Inhabited localities: 43 rural localities

Municipal structure
  - Municipally incorporated as: Ubinsky Municipal District
  - Municipal divisions: 0 urban settlements, 16 rural settlements
- Time zone: UTC+7 (MSK+4)
- OKTMO ID: 50654000
- Website: https://ubinadm.nso.ru/

Ubinsky District (Russian: Уби́нский райо́н) is an administrative and municipal district (raion), one of the thirty in Novosibirsk Oblast, Russia. It is located in the center of the oblast. The area of the district is 13,760 square kilometers (5,310 sq mi). Its administrative center is the rural locality (a selo) of Ubinskoye. Population: 16,297 (2010 Census); 19,300 (2002 census); 21,107 (1989 Soviet census). The population of Ubinskoye accounts for 35.8% of the district's total population. The district's name comes from Lake Ubinskoye, which is mostly located inside the district.
