= UTair Express =

2006–2015 Russian regional airline

IATA	ICAO	Call sign
UR	UTX	–
- Founded: December 2006
- Ceased operations: June 2015
- Hubs: Syktyvkar Airport
- Fleet size: 28
- Destinations: 31
- Parent company: UTair Aviation
- Headquarters: Syktyvkar, Komi, Russia
- Website: utair-express.com

UTair Express was a Russian regional airline headquartered in Syktyvkar, Komi, and a subsidiary of UTair Aviation. Its main base was Syktyvkar Airport. It ceased operations on 10 June 2015.

== History ==
UTair Express' predecessor Komiinteravia was established in March 1996 and started operations in July 1997.

In 2004, UTair gained control of more than 70% of Komiinteravia. UTair planned to set up a new regional division using its subsidiary Komiinteravia that was to operate as UTair Express using Antonov An-24 and ATR 42-300 aircraft. It planned to replace its Komiinteravia's An-24 fleet with additional ATR 42-300 aircraft over the next few years.

UTair Express completed registration in December 2006 and emerged from the reorganization of Komiinteravia. The airline received a certificate in commercial air transport operations on Antonov An-24 aircraft. As soon as all of the An-24s have been decommissioned according to the airline's plan, UTair's air fleet will include up to 20 ATR 42 aircraft. UTair Express also embraces Russia's largest Tupolev Tu-134 maintenance center.

On 10 June 2015, Russian authorities suspended the airline's operating license until further notice due to a request filed by UTair itself. The fleet and route network will be transferred to UTair Aviation until further notice as part of restructuring arrangements.

== Destinations ==
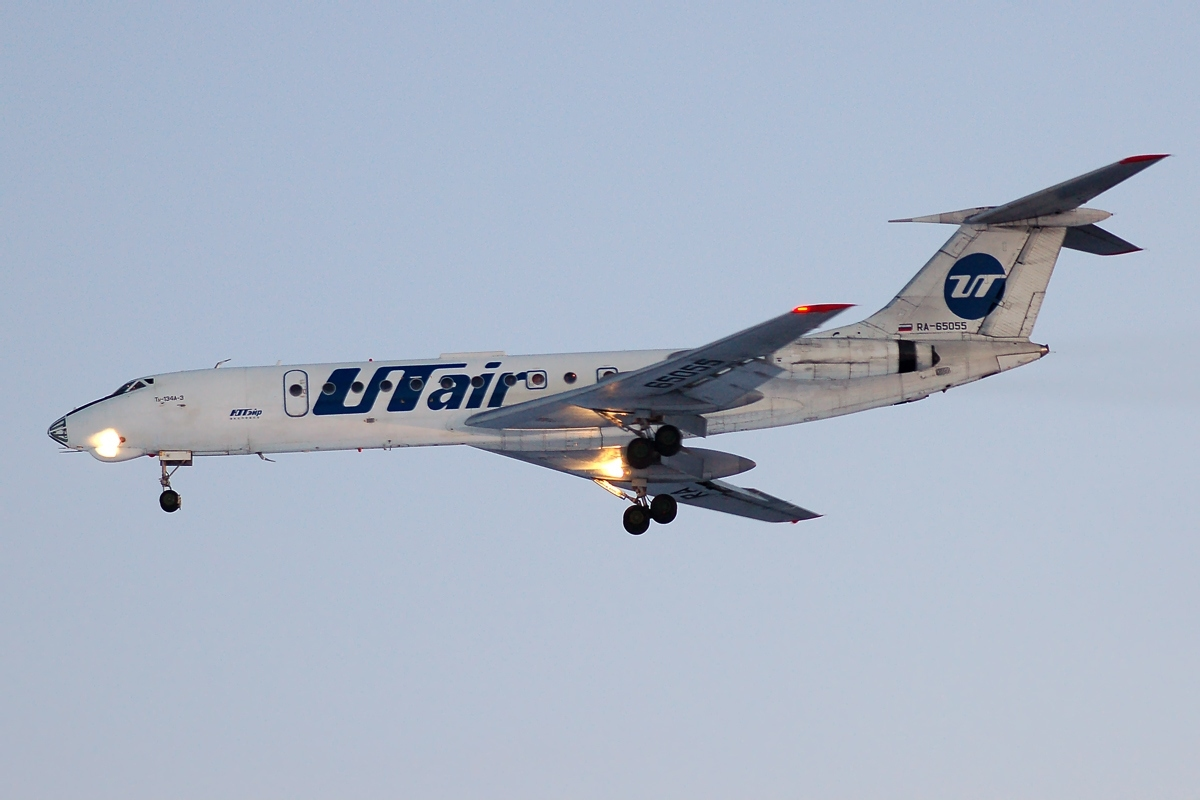
A now-retired UTair Express Tupolev Tu-134 in 2011

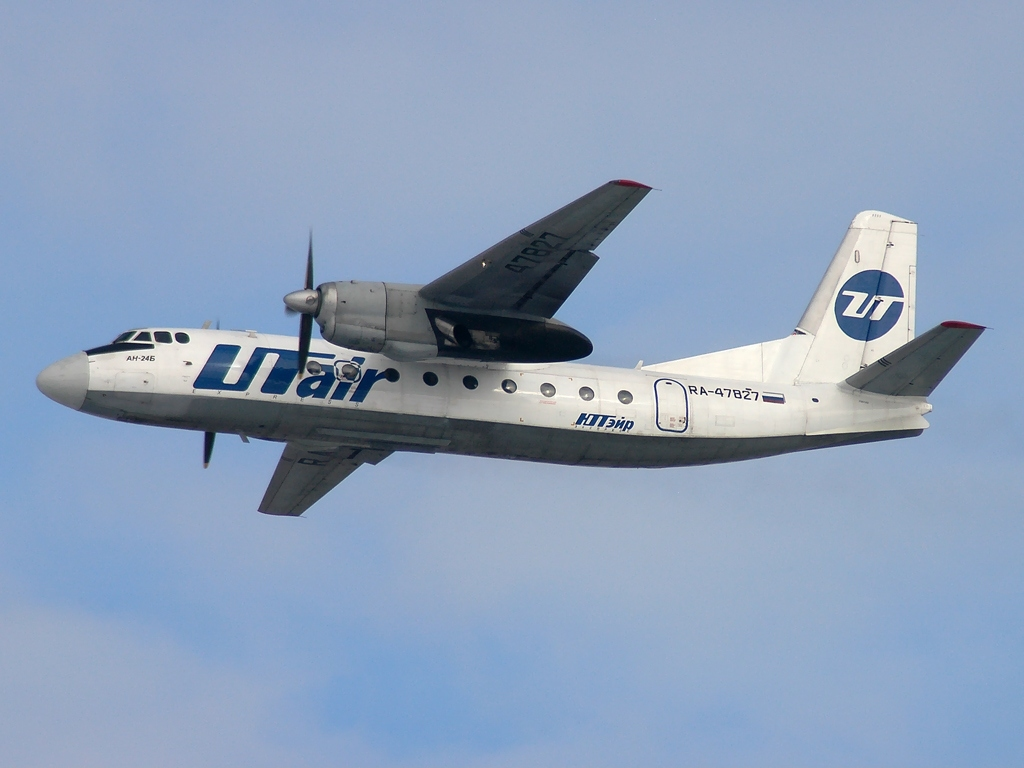
UTair Express Antonov An-24

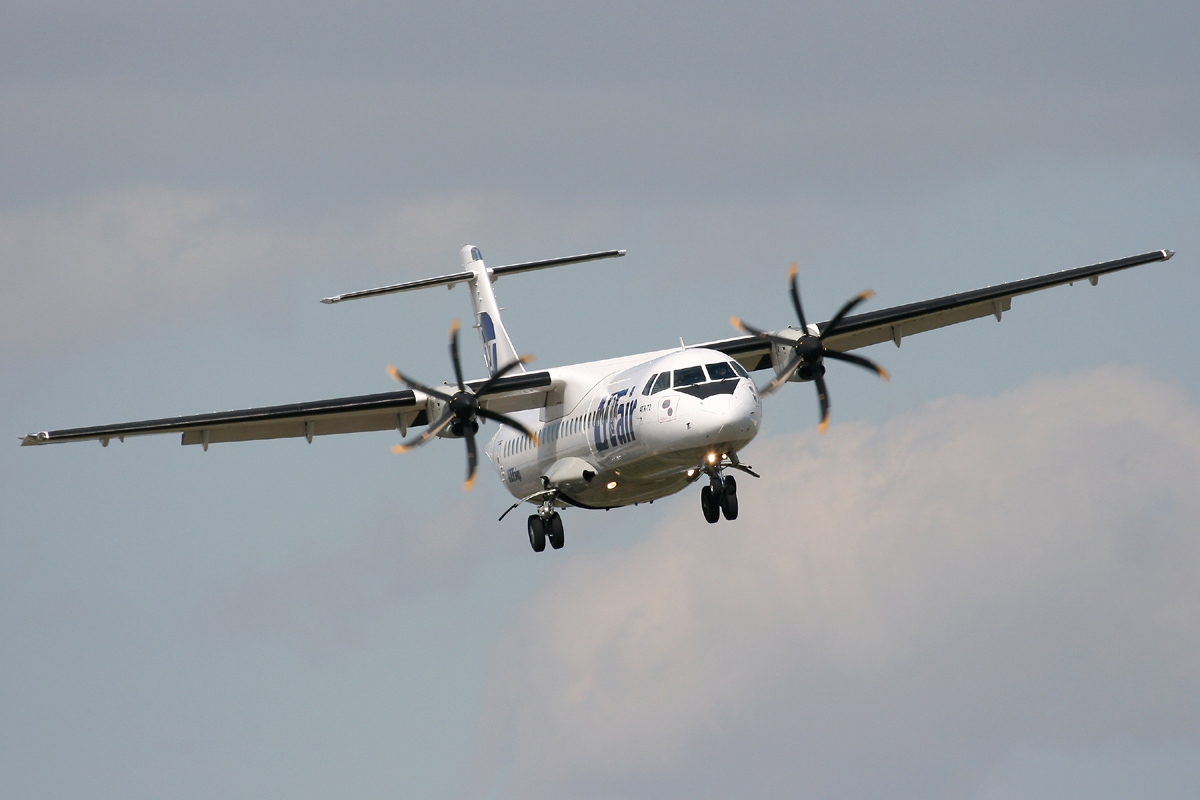
UTair Express ATR 72-500

UTair Express operated scheduled flights to the following destinations as of April 2014:

=== Lithuania ===
- Vilnius – Vilnius International Airport

=== Russia ===
Arkhangelsk Oblast

- Arkhangelsk – Talagi Airport
  Nenets Autonomous Okrug
  - Naryan-Mar – Naryan-Mar Airport

Bashkortostan

- Ufa – Ufa International Airport

Kirov Oblast

- Kirov – Pobedilovo Airport

(Komi Republic) Komi

- Syktyvkar – Syktyvkar Airport
- Ukhta – Ukhta Airport
- Usinsk – Usinsk Airport
- Ust-Tsylma – Ust-Tsylma Airport
- Vorkuta – Vorkuta Airport

Krasnodar Krai

- Anapa – Vityazevo Airport seasonal
- Sochi – Adler-Sochi International Airport seasonal

Kursk Oblast

- Kursk – Kursk Vostochny Airport

Moscow / Moscow Oblast

- Moscow – Vnukovo International Airport

Nizhny Novgorod Oblast

- Nizhny Novgorod – Strigino Airport

Novosibirsk Oblast

- Novosibirsk – Tolmachevo Airport

Omsk Oblast

- Omsk – Omsk Tsentralny Airport

Samara Oblast

- Samara – Kurumoch Airport

Sverdlovsk Oblast

- Yekaterinburg – Koltsovo Airport

Tambov Oblast

- Tambov – Tambov Airport

Tatarstan

- Kazan – Kazan

Tyumen Oblast

- Tyumen – Roshchino Airport
  Khanty-Mansi Autonomous Okrug
  - Beloyarsky – Beloyarsk Airport
  - Khanty-Mansiysk – Khanty-Mansiysk Airport
  - Nizhnevartovsk – Nizhnevartovsk Airport
  - Nyagan – Nyagan Airport
  - Sovetsky – Sovetsky Airport
  - Surgut – Surgut International Airport
  Yamalo-Nenets Autonomous Okrug
  - Novy Urengoy – Novy Urengoy Airport

Ulyanovsk Oblast

- Ulyanovsk – Ulyanovsk Baratayevka Airport

Voronezh Oblast

- Voronezh – Chertovitskoye Airport

== Fleet ==
As of April 2014, UTair Express operated the following aircraft types:

Aircraft	In fleet	Orders	Seats	Notes
ATR 72-500	15	1	70	
Antonov An-24	13	—	40–48	
