= List of Smartavia destinations =

The Russian airline Smartavia serves the following scheduled destinations (as of April 2019).

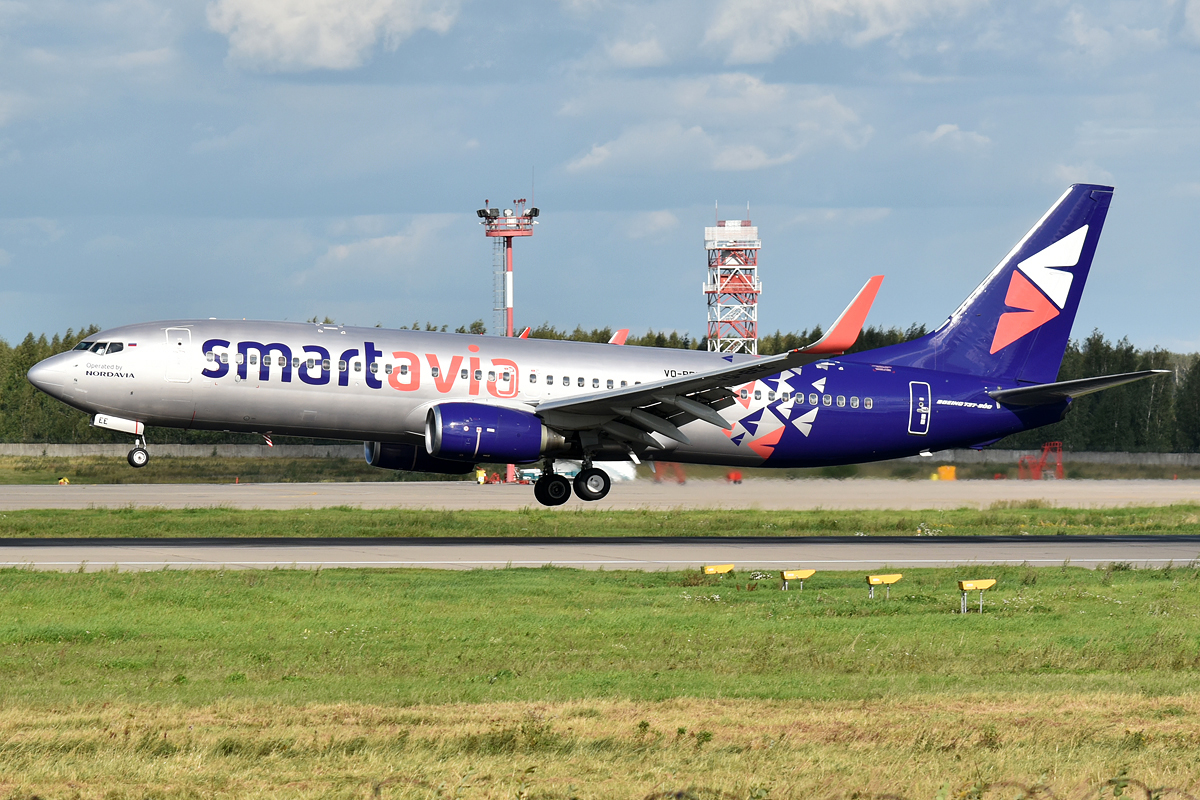
Smartavia Boeing 737-800 departing Moscow-Domodedovo

== List ==
Country	City	Airport	Notes	Ref
Armenia	Yerevan	Zvartnots International Airport	Terminated	
Azerbaijan	Baku	Heydar Aliev International Airport	Terminated	
Estonia	Tallinn	Lennart Meri Tallinn Airport	Terminated	
Finland	Helsinki	Vantaa Airport	Terminated	
Georgia	Batumi	Alexander Kartveli Batumi International Airport	Terminated	
Georgia	Tbilisi	Shota Rustaveli Tbilisi International Airport	Terminated	
Norway	Oslo	Oslo Airport, Gardermoen	Terminated	
Russia	Amderma	Amderma Airport	Terminated	
Russia	Anapa	Vityazevo Airport	Terminated	
Russia	Arkhangelsk	Talagi Airport	Focus city	
Russia	Astrakhan	Narimanovo Airport	Terminated	
Russia	Belgorod	Belgorod International Airport	Terminated	
Russia	Cheboksary	Cheboksary International Airport	Terminated	
Russia	Chelyabinsk	Balandino Airport		
Russia	Gelendzhik	Gelendzhik Airport	Terminated	
Russia	Irkutsk	International Airport Irkutsk	Terminated	
Russia	Ivanovo	Ivanovo Yuzhny Airport	Terminated	
Russia	Kaliningrad	Khrabrovo Airport		>
Russia	Kazan	Ğabdulla Tuqay Kazan International Airport		
Russia	Kirovsk/Apatity	Khibiny Airport	Terminated	
Russia	Kotlas	Kotlas Airport	Terminated	
Russia	Krasnodar	Pashkovsky Airport	Resumes 27 October 2025	
Russia	Leshukonskoye	Leshukonskoye Airport	Terminated	
Russia	Makhachkala	Uytash Airport		
Russia	Mineralnye Vody	Mineralnye Vody Airport		
Russia	Moscow	Moscow Domodedovo Airport	Terminated	
Russia	Moscow	Sheremetyevo International Airport	Hub	
Russia	Murmansk	Emperor Nicholas II Murmansk Airport	Focus city	
Russia	Naryan-Mar	Naryan-Mar Airport		
Russia	Nizhnekamsk	Begishevo Airport	Terminated	
Russia	Nizhnevartovsk	Nizhnevartovsk Airport	Terminated	
Russia	Nizhny Novgorod	Strigino International Airport		
Russia	Novy Urengoy	Novy Urengoy Airport	Terminated	
Russia	Omsk	Omsk Tsentralny Airport		
Russia	Orenburg	Orenburg Tsentralny Airport		
Russia	Perm	Bolshoye Savino Airport	Seasonal	
Russia	Rostov-on-Don	Platov International Airport	Terminated	
Russia	Saint Petersburg	Pulkovo Airport	Focus city	
Russia	Samara	Kurumoch International Airport		
Russia	Saratov	Saratov Gagarin Airport	Terminated	
Russia	Sochi	Adler-Sochi International Airport		
Russia	Solovetsky Islands	Solovki Airport	Terminated	
Russia	Stavropol	Shpakovskoye Airport	Terminated	
Russia	Syktyvkar	Syktyvkar Airport		
Russia	Ufa	Mustai Karim Ufa International Airport		
Russia	Ulan-Ude	Baikal International Airport		
Russia	Usinsk	Usinsk Airport	Terminated	
Russia	Volgograd	Gumrak Airport	Terminated	
Russia	Voronezh	Chertovitskoye Airport	Terminated	
Russia	Yekaterinburg	Koltsovo Airport		
Russia \ Ukraine (Note: Disputed. See Annexation of Crimea by the Russian Federation.)	Simferopol	Simferopol International Airport	Terminated	
Turkey	Istanbul	Istanbul Airport	Terminated}	
Ukraine	Kyiv	Boryspil International Airport	Terminated	
Uzbekistan	Bukhara	Bukhara International Airport	Terminated	
Uzbekistan	Namangan	Namangan Airport	Terminated	
