= Komiaviatrans =

Russian regional airline

Komiaviatrans Комиавиатранс
IATA	ICAO	Call sign
KO	KMA	KOMI AVIA
- Founded: 1998
- Operating bases: Syktyvkar Airport
- Secondary hubs: Kaluga Airport; Ukhta Airport; Usinsk Airport
- Fleet size: 15
- Destinations: 27
- Headquarters: Syktyvkar, Komi, Russia
- Website: komiaviatrans.ru

Komiaviatrans (Russian: Комиавиатранс) is a regional airline from Russia, which operates mostly domestic regional flights from Komi Republic. Its headquarter located in Syktyvkar.

It is banned from flying in the EU along with all other Russian airlines.

== Destinations ==
Komivaiatrans operates scheduled flights to the following domestic destinations (As of May 2015):

=== Domestic ===
Arkhangelsk Oblast

- Arkhangelsk – Talagi Airport
- Kotlas – Kotlas Airport

Belgorod Oblast

- Belgorod – Belgorod International Airport

Kaluga Oblast

- Kaluga – Grabtsevo Airport secondary base

Komi

- Inta – Inta Airport
- Koslan – Koslan Airport
- Pechora – Pechora Airport
- Syktyvkar – Syktyvkar Airport base
- Troitsko-Pechorsk – Troitsko-Pechorsk Airport
- Ukhta – Ukhta Airport focus city
- Usinsk – Usinsk Airport focus city
- Ust-Tsilma – Ust-Tsilma Airport
- Vorkuta – Vorkuta Airport
- Vuktyl – Vuktyl Airport

Krasnodar Krai

- Anapa – Vityazevo Airport seasonal
- Krasnodar – Pashkovsky Airport seasonal
- Sochi – Adler-Sochi International Airport seasonal

Moscow / Moscow Oblast

- Moscow Domodedovo Airport

Nizhny Novgorod Oblast

- Nizhny Novgorod – Strigino International Airport

Perm Krai

- Perm – Bolshoye Savino Airport

St Petersburg / Leningrad Oblast

- Pulkovo Airport

Samara Oblast

- Samara – Kurumoch International Airport

Saratov Oblast

- Saratov – Saratov Tsentralny Airport

Stavropol Krai

- Mineralnye Vody – Mineralnye Vody Airport

Sverdlovsk Oblast

- Yekaterinburg – Koltsovo Airport

Tatarstan

- Nizhnekamsk – Begishevo Airport

=== International ===
Azerbaijan

- Baku – Heydar Aliyev International Airport

== Fleet ==
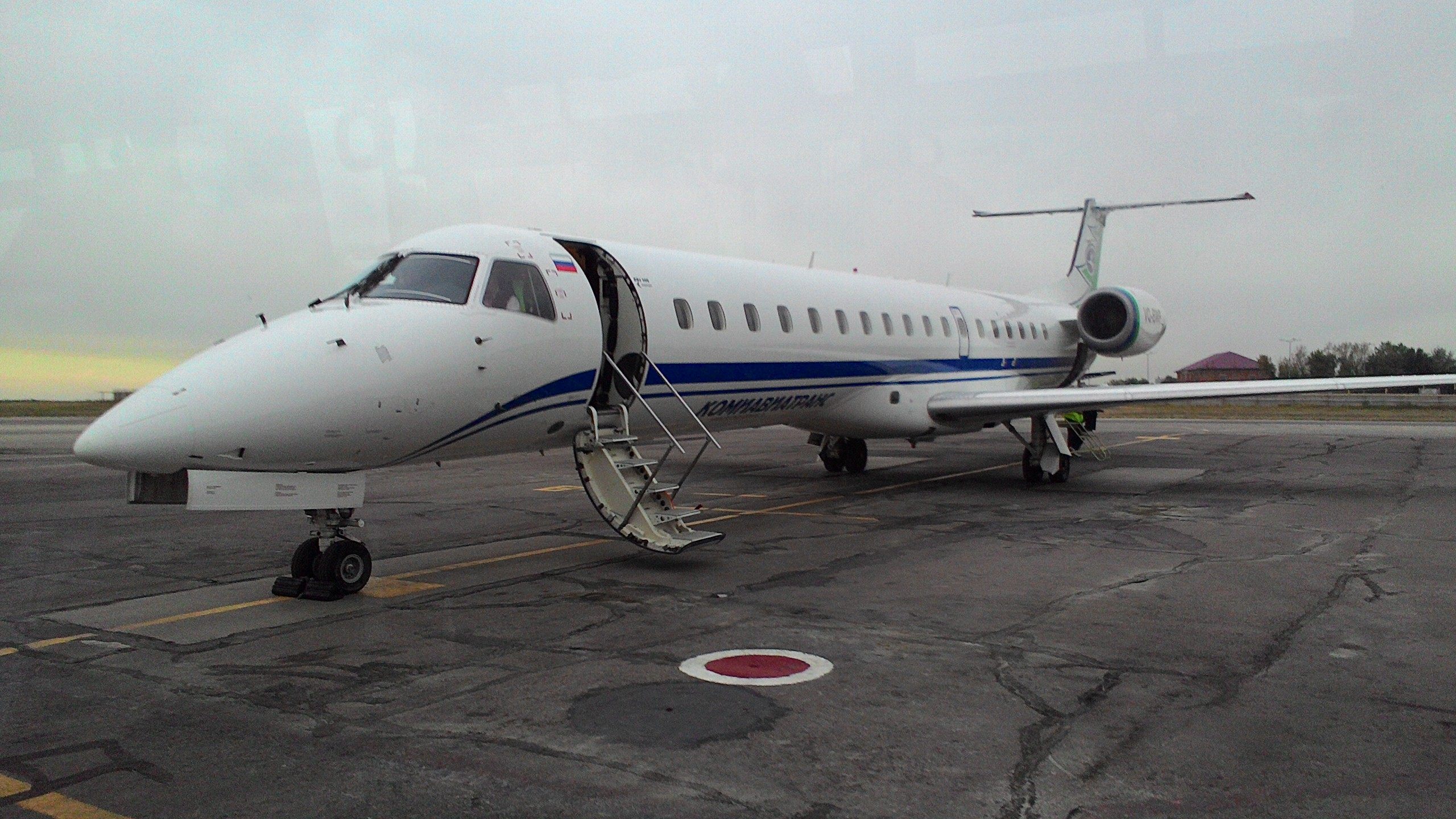
Komiaviatrans Embraer ERJ-145

As of May 2015, the Komiaviatrans fleet consists of the following aircraft:

Aircraft	In fleet	Orders	Seats	Notes
Embraer ERJ 145LR	5		50	(as of August 2017)
Let L-410 Turbolet	4	—	15	Stopped operations

In addition Komiavaiatrans Airlines operates 3 Mi-2 and 29 Mi-8 helicopters.
