= Aeroflot Flight 2306 =

1986 aviation accident in the Soviet Union

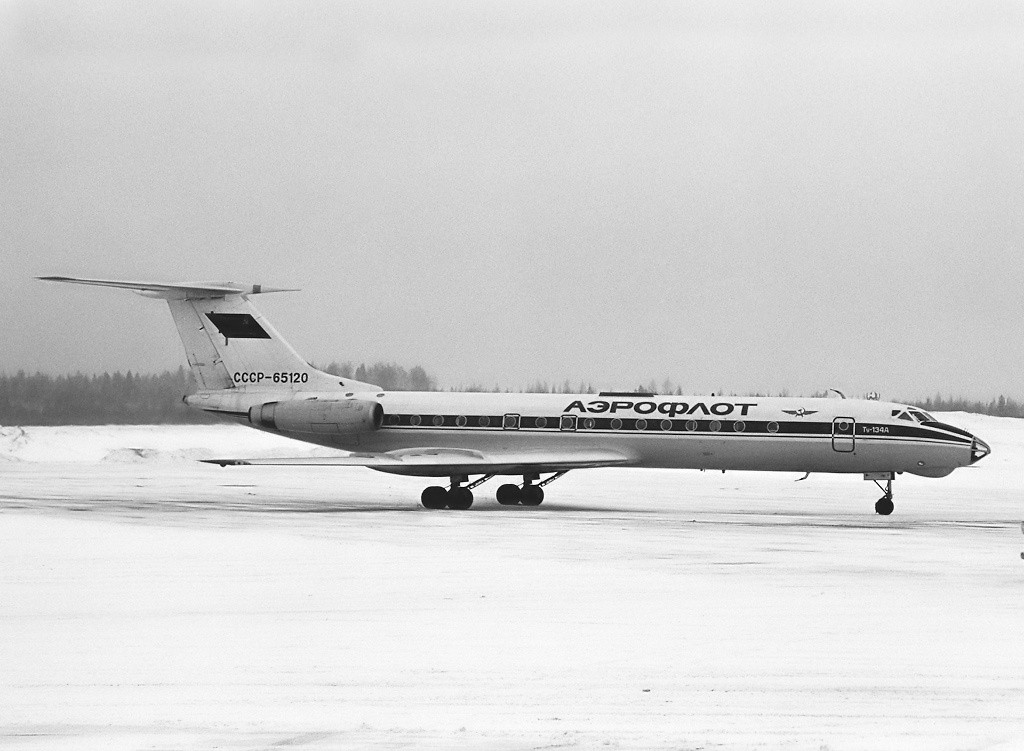
- CCCP-65120, the aircraft involved in the accident, seen in 1980

Accident
- Date: 2 July 1986
- Summary: In-flight fire
- Site: Sysolsky district, Komi ASSR, Russian SFSR, USSR; 61°12′N 49°49′E

Aircraft
- Aircraft type: Tupolev Tu-134AK
- Operator: Aeroflot
- Registration: CCCP-65120
- Flight origin: Vorkuta Airport, Vorkuta
- Stopover: Syktyvkar Airport, Syktyvkar
- Destination: Sheremetyevo Airport, Moscow
- Occupants: 92
- Passengers: 86
- Crew: 6
- Fatalities: 54
- Injuries: 38
- Survivors: 38

Aeroflot Flight 2306 was a scheduled domestic passenger flight from Vorkuta to Moscow in the Soviet Union, with a stopover in Syktyvkar. The Tupolev Tu-134 operated by Aeroflot crashed on 2 July 1986 during an emergency landing after it departed Syktyvkar, killing 54 of 92 passengers and crew on board.

== Aircraft ==
The aircraft was a Tupolev Tu-134AK, manufactured in 1978 and registered as CCCP-65120 to the Komi Civil Aviation department of Aeroflot. At the time of the crash the aircraft had sustained 7,989 pressurization cycles and 13,988 flight hours.

== See also ==
- Air Canada Flight 797
- ValuJet Flight 592
- Saudia Flight 163
- Swissair Flight 111
