= Syktyvkar (disambiguation) =

Syktyvkar is the capital city of the Komi Republic, Russia.

Syktyvkar may also refer to:

- Syktyvkar Urban Okrug, a municipal formation which the city of republic significance of Syktyvkar in the Komi Republic, Russia is incorporated as
- Syktyvkar Airport, an airport in the Komi Republic, Russia
- Syktyvkar Southwest, an unfinished and abandoned airport in the Komi Republic, Russia
