= Komiinteravia =

IATA	ICAO	Call sign
8J	KMV	Komiinter
- Founded: March 1996
- Ceased operations: 2006 (merged into UTair Express)
- Hubs: Syktyvkar Airport
- Fleet size: 5
- Destinations: 4
- Headquarters: Syktyvkar, Komi Republic, Russia
- Website: komi.com/avia.asp

JSC Komiinteravia (Russian: ОАО "Комиинтеравиа") was an airline based in Syktyvkar, Komi Republic, Russia. It operated scheduled domestic passenger services, as well as passenger and cargo charter flights to domestic and international destinations. Its main base was Syktyvkar Airport.

Parent company UTair Aviation reorganised Komiinteravia into a new airline UTair Express, which received a certificate in commercial air transport operations on Antonov An-24 aircraft in December 2006.

== History ==
The airline was established in March 1996 and started operations in July 1997. In 2004 UTair gained control of more than 70% shares of Komiinteravia (carried 200,000 passengers in 2003).

UTair is planning to set up a new regional division using its subsidiary Komiinteravia that will operate as UTair Express using Antonov An-24 and ATR 42-300 aircraft. It is planning to replace its Komiinteravia's Antonov An-24 fleet with additional ATR 42-300s over the next few years.

The airline's IATA code has since been adopted by Jet4You.

== Destinations ==
Komiinteravia operated the following services (as of January 2005):

- Domestic scheduled destinations: Syktyvkar, Ukhta, Usinsk and Vorkuta.

== Fleet ==
As of March 2007 the Komiinteravia fleet included:

- 5 Antonov An-24RV

=== Previously operated ===
As of January 2005 the airline also operated:

- 4 Tupolev Tu-134A
- 1 Tupolev Tu-134B
- 1 Yakovlev Yak-40
