= RusLine =

Russian airline

RusLine РусЛайн

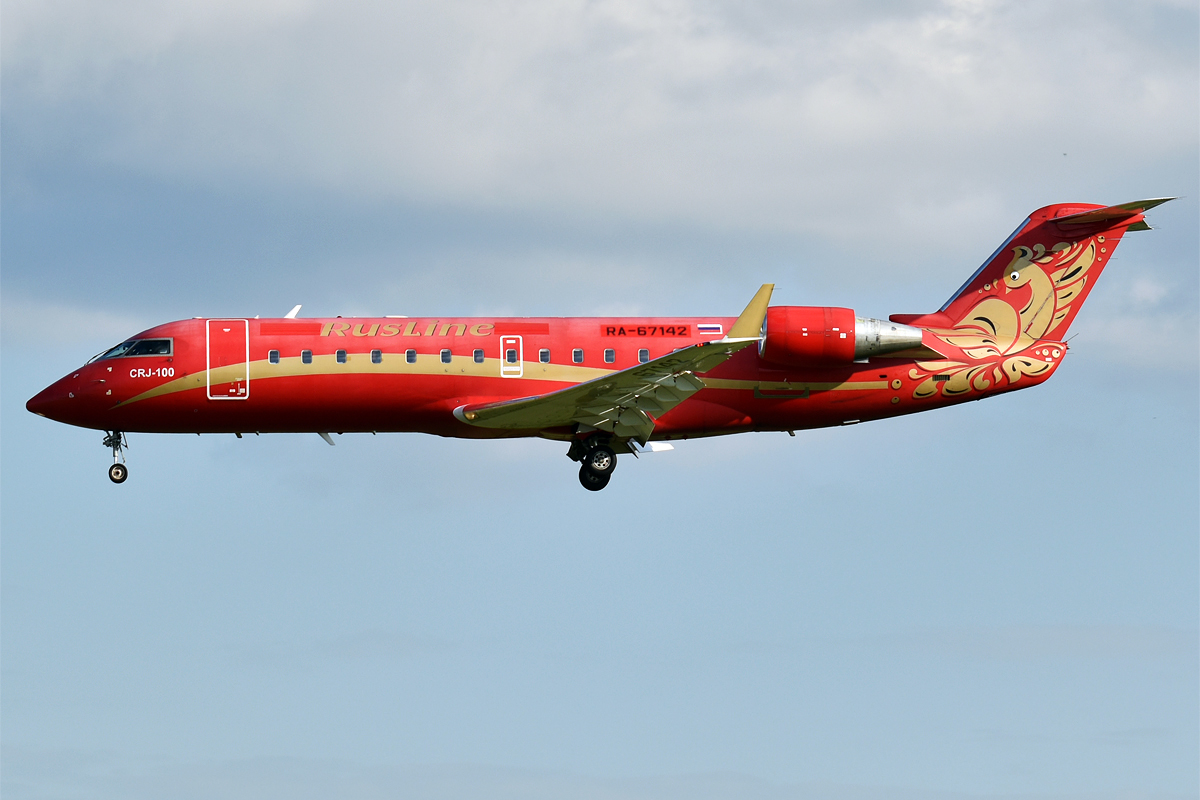
- RusLine Bombardier CRJ-100ER
IATA	ICAO	Call sign
7R	RLU	RUSLINE AIR
- Founded: 1997; 29 years ago
- Operating bases: Moscow-Vnukovo
- Secondary hubs: Saint Petersburg; Ulan-Ude; Voronezh; Yekaterinburg
- Fleet size: 9
- Destinations: 22
- Headquarters: Moscow, Russia
- Website: www.rusline.aero

RusLine (Russian: Авиакомпания «РусЛайн», Aviakompanija «RusLajn») is a regional airline from Russia that operates mostly domestic regional flights, as well as holiday charters. Its headquarters are located in the Omega Plaza (Омега Плаза) business centre in Moscow, Russia. As of June 2025, the airline is banned from flying into the EU like all other Russian airlines.

== History ==
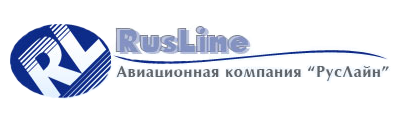
The RusLine logo used until 2010, when the branding acquired from Air Volga was adopted

The company was founded in 1997, started charter flight as Aerotex Airlines and was originally based at Sheremetyevo International Airport. In March 2003, it was renamed RusLine, which coincided with a move to Vnukovo International Airport shortly after. The company started scheduled flights on Yak-40, Yak-42, Tu-134.

On 1 April 2010, RusLine acquired the assets and brand name of bankrupt Air Volga. This included six Bombardier CRJ200 aircraft, and Air Volga's base at Volgograd International Airport. The airline also changed his base airport for Moscow Domodedovo Airport.

Originally, the airline operated several ageing Soviet-built aircraft. The first Western airliner, a 50-seat Bombardier CRJ100, was introduced with RusLine in February 2008. Over the following years, further planes of that type (all of which had been acquired second-hand) were added. In April 2012, RusLine took delivery of two larger Airbus A319 aircraft formerly owned by easyJet in order to address the growing demand for charter flights.

In 2015, RusLine launched route from Domodedovo Airport to Europe (Vilnius, Oslo, Palanga). In 2017, the airlines extended his european routes from Domodedovo to Leipzig/Halle Airport and to Riga International Airport; from Pulkovo Airport to Bergen, Palanga and Talinn; and from Kaliningrad to Berlin and Prague. The company also signed a contract with Hotels.com to represent its logo on the fuselage of Bombardier CRJ-100 VQ-BVK.

In 2018, Rusline changed bas airport in Moscow from Domodedovo to Vnukovo.

== Destinations ==
As of February 2013, RusLine operates scheduled flights to the following destinations.

Country	Region	City	Airport	Notes
Kazakhstan	Aqtobe Region	Aqtobe	Aliya Moldagulova International Airport	Terminated
Kazakhstan	Mangystau Region	Aqtau	Aqtau International Airport	Terminated
Lebanon	Beirut Governorate	Beirut	Beirut–Rafic Hariri International Airport	Terminated
Turkey	Central Anatolia Region	Ankara	Ankara Esenboğa Airport	Terminated
Turkey	Marmara Region	Istanbul	Istanbul Airport	Terminated
Russia	Arkhangelsk Oblast	Arkhangelsk	Vaskovo Airport	Terminated
Russia	Arkhangelsk Oblast	Arkhangelsk	Talagi Airport	
Russia	Bashkortostan	Ufa	Mustai Karim Ufa International Airport	
Russia	Belgorod Oblast	Belgorod	Belgorod International Airport	Terminated
Russia	Buryatia	Ulan-Ude	Baikal International Airport	
Russia	Chelyabinsk Oblast	Chelyabinsk	Kurchatov Chelyabinsk International Airport	
Russia	Dagestan	Makhachkala	Uytash Airport	
Russia	Irkutsk Oblast	Irkutsk	International Airport Irkutsk	
Russia	Ivanovo Oblast	Ivanovo	Ivanovo Yuzhny Airport	
Russia	Kalmykia	Elista	Elista Airport	Terminated
Russia	Kaluga Oblast	Kaluga	Grabtsevo Airport	
Russia	Karelia	Petrozavodsk	Besovets Airport	
Russia	Khanty-Mansi Autonomous Okrug	Beloyarsky	Beloyarsk Airport	
Russia	Khanty-Mansi Autonomous Okrug	Khanty-Mansiysk	Khanty-Mansiysk Airport	
Russia	Kirov Oblast	Kirov	Pobedilovo Airport	
Russia	Komi	Vorkuta	Vorkuta Airport	
Russia	Komi	Syktyvkar	Syktyvkar Airport	
Russia	Krasnodar Krai	Gelendzhik	Gelendzhik Airport	Terminated
Russia	Krasnodar Krai	Krasnodar	Pashkovsky Airport	Terminated
Russia	Krasnodar Krai	Sochi	Adler-Sochi International Airport	
Russia	Lipetsk Oblast	Lipetsk	Lipetsk Airport	Terminated
Russia	Mari El	Yoshkar-Ola	Yoshkar-Ola Airport	Suspended
Russia	Mordovia	Saransk	Saransk Airport	
Russia	Moscow; Moscow Oblast	Moscow	Vnukovo International Airport	Base
Russia	Moscow; Moscow Oblast	Moscow	Zhukovsky International Airport	Terminated
Russia	Nenets Autonomous Okrug	Naryan-Mar	Naryan-Mar Airport	
Russia	Novosibirsk Oblast	Novosibirsk	Tolmachevo Airport	
Russia	Penza Oblast	Penza	Penza Vissarion Belinsky Airport	Terminated
Russia	Stavropol Krai	Mineralnye Vody	Mineralnye Vody Airport	
Russia	Saint Petersburg; Leningrad Oblast	Saint Petersburg	Pulkovo Airport	Base
Russia	Samara Oblast	Samara	Kurumoch International Airport	
Russia	Saratov Oblast	Saratov	Saratov Gagarin Airport	
Russia	Sverdlovsk Oblast	Yekaterinburg	Koltsovo Airport	Hub
Russia	Tambov Oblast	Tambov	Tambov Donskoye Airport	
Russia	Tatarstan	Kazan	Ğabdulla Tuqay Kazan International Airport	
Russia	Tatarstan	Naberezhnye Chelny; Nizhnekamsk	Begishevo Airport	
Russia	Udmurtia	Izhevsk	Izhevsk Airport	
Russia	Ulyanovsk Oblast	Ulyanovsk	Ulyanovsk Baratayevka Airport	
Russia	Volgograd Oblast	Volgograd	Gumrak Airport	Terminated
Russia	Voronezh Oblast	Voronezh	Chertovitskoye Airport	Terminated
Russia	Yamalo-Nenets Autonomous Okrug	Nadym	Nadym Airport	
Russia	Yamalo-Nenets Autonomous Okrug	Salekhard	Salekhard Airport	
Russia	Yaroslavl Oblast	Yaroslavl	Golden Ring Yaroslavl International Airport	
Abkhazia	Abkhazia	Sukhumi	Vladislav Ardzinba Sukhum International Airport	

== Fleet ==
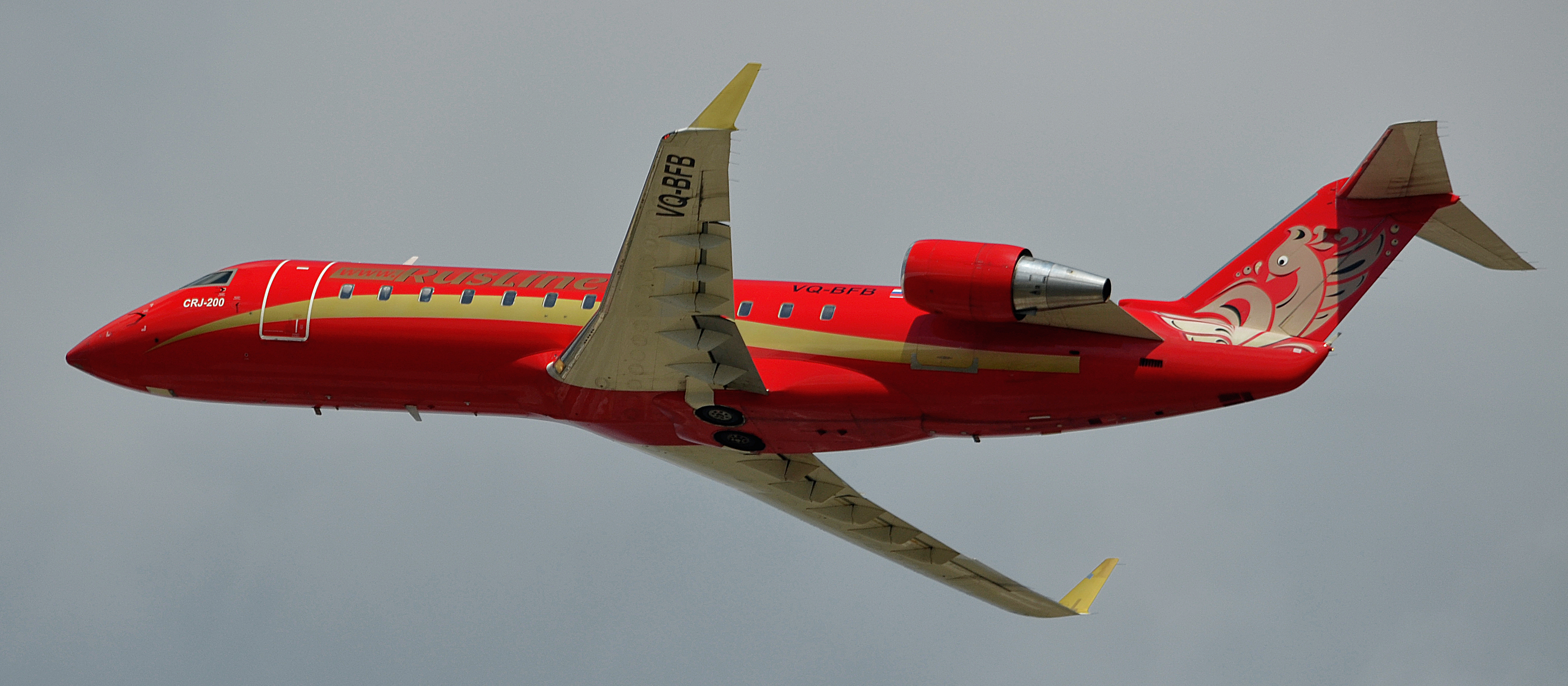
RusLine Bombardier CRJ200

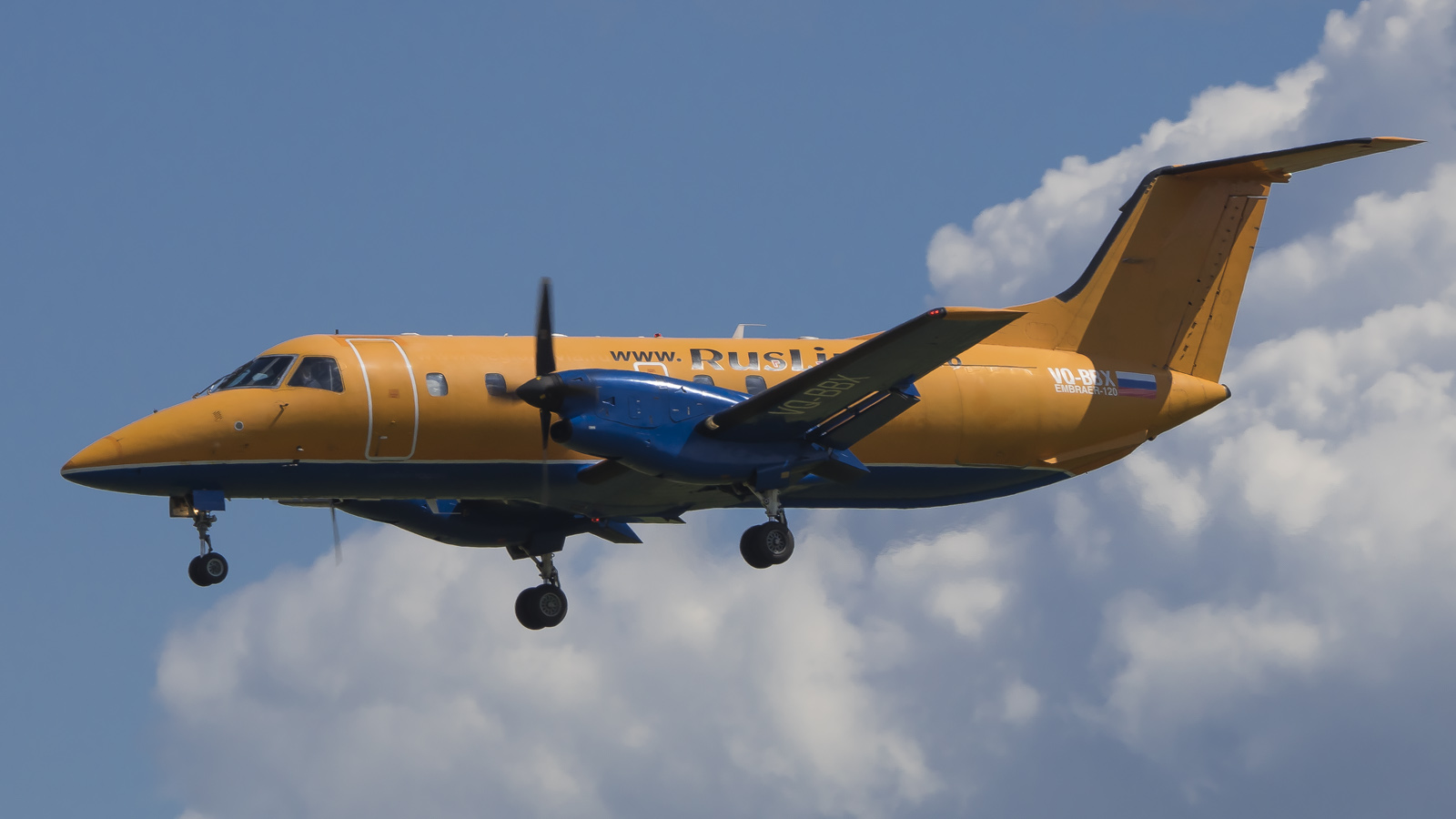
Former RusLine Embraer EMB 120 Brasilia

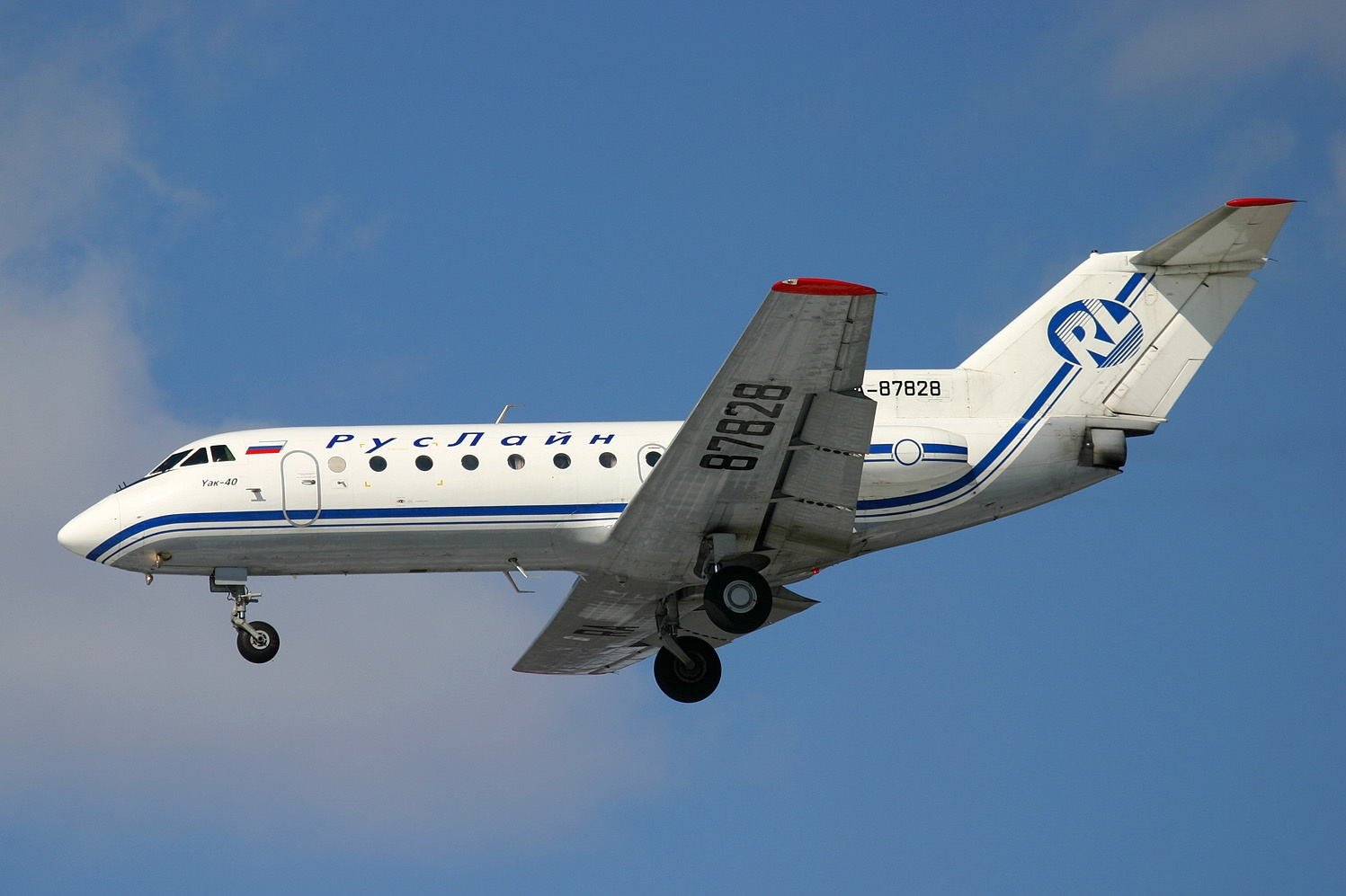
Former RusLine Yakovlev Yak-40

=== Current fleet ===
As of August 2025, RusLine operates the following aircraft:

RusLine fleet
Aircraft	In service	Orders	Passengers	Notes
Bombardier CRJ100	5	—	50	
Bombardier CRJ200	4	—	50	
Total	9	—		

=== Historic fleet ===
Over the years, the following aircraft types were operated:

Aircraft	Introduced	Retired
Embraer EMB 120 Brasilia	2011	2015
Tupolev Tu-134	1997	2011
Yakovlev Yak-40	1997	2011

== Accidents and incidents ==
- On 20 June 2011, 47 people died in the crash of Flight 243. The aircraft involved, a Tupolev Tu-134 (registered RA-65691) had been leased by RusLine from RusAir and was approaching Petrozavodsk Airport, completing a flight from Moscow-Domodedovo. Due to poor visibility conditions, the pilots were unaware that they descended too rapidly, so that the aircraft struck trees and impacted on a highway. There were five survivors.
