= Yoshkar-Ola (disambiguation) =

Yoshkar-Ola is the capital city of the Mari El Republic, Russia.

Yoshkar-Ola may also refer to:

- Yoshkar-Ola Urban Okrug, a municipal formation which the city of republic significance of Yoshkar-Ola in the Mari El Republic, Russia is incorporated as
- Yoshkar-Ola Airport, an airport in the Mari El Republic, Russia
- 2910 Yoshkar-Ola, a main-belt asteroid
