= Inta Airport =

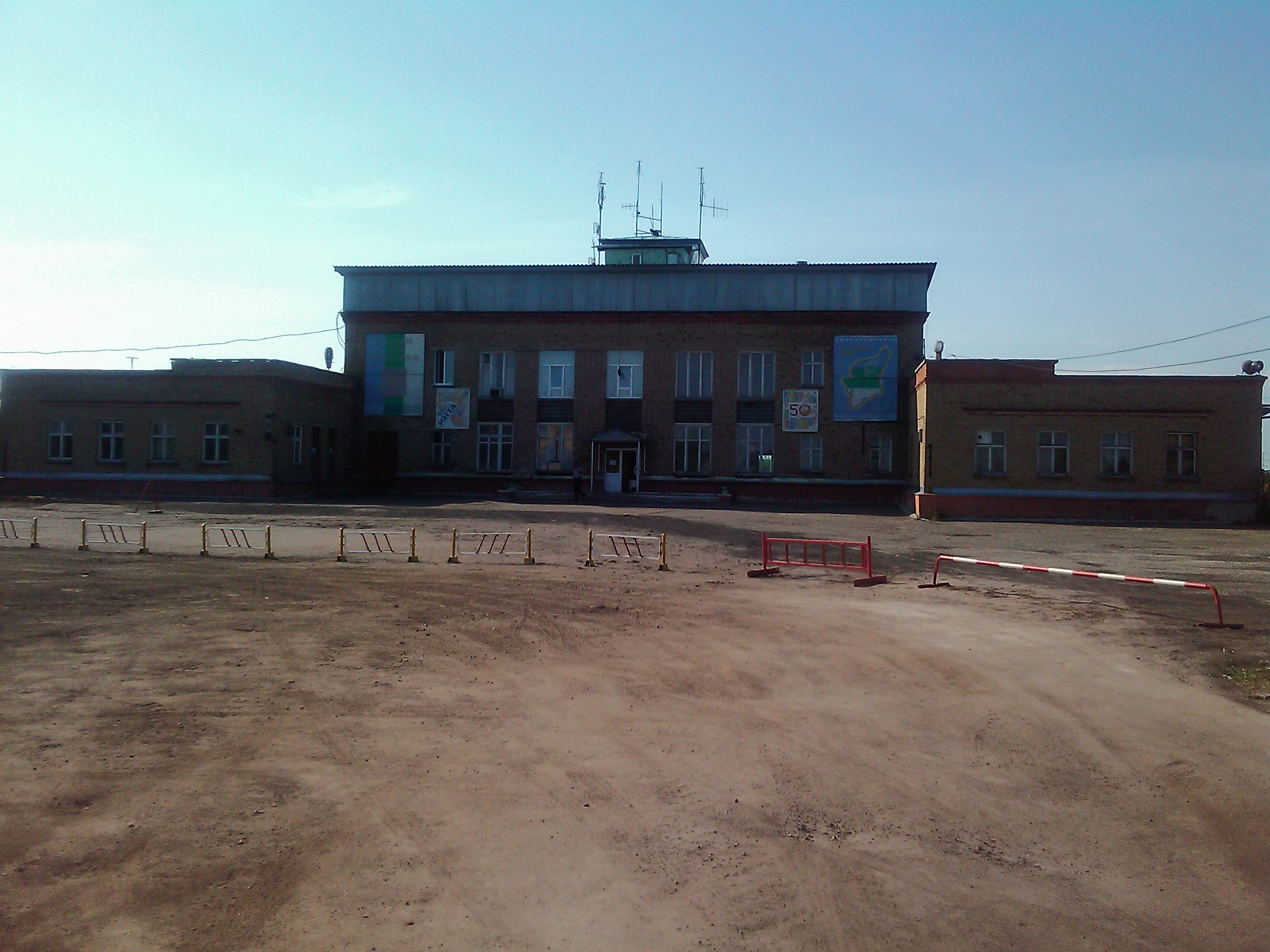
- IATA: INA; ICAO: UUYI

Summary
- Airport type: Public
- Operator: Komiaviatrans
- Location: Inta
- Elevation AMSL: 184 ft / 56 m
- Coordinates: 66°3′20″N 60°6′41″E
- Interactive map of Inta Airport

Runways
Direction	Length		Surface
Direction	ft	m	Surface
02/20	4,757	1,450	Concrete

Inta Airport (Komi: Инта Аэропорт, Russian: Аэропорт Инта) (IATA: INA, ICAO: UUYI) is an airport in Komi Republic, Russia located 2 km north of Inta. It services small transport aircraft.

== History ==
On October 8, 2013, air traffic between Inta and the capital of the republic, Syktyvkar, was resumed. Flights are operated by Komiaviatrans airline twice a week (Tuesday, Saturday) on an L-410 aircraft. The airline also carries out passenger transportation from the airport to the villages of the Intinsky district (Adzvavom, Kosyuvom, Petrun) and the villages of the Nenets Autonomous Okrug (Kharuta, Khorey-ver).

In 2022, the Inta airfield was excluded from the register of Russian civil aviation airfields.

== Airlines and destinations ==
Airlines	Destinations
Komiaviatrans	Syktyvkar

== See also ==
- List of airports in Russia
