= Jet4you =

Low-cost airline of Morocco (2006–2012)

IATA	ICAO	Call sign
TB	JFU	ARGAN
- Founded: 2006
- Commenced operations: 26 February 2006
- Ceased operations: April 2012 (merged into Jetairfly)
- Operating bases: Agadir; Casablanca; Charleroi; Marrakesh; Paris–Orly
- Fleet size: 4
- Destinations: 38
- Parent company: TUI Travel plc
- Headquarters: Casablanca, Morocco
- Key people: Jawad Ziyat (CEO)
- Website: www.jet4you.com

Jet4you was a low-cost airline based in Casablanca, Morocco. It operated services between Moroccan cities and destinations in France, Belgium, Germany, Switzerland, Spain, Ireland (Sunway charter) and Italy. Its main base was Casablanca Mohammed V International Airport, with focus cities at Agadir, Nador, Paris and Tangier.

== History ==
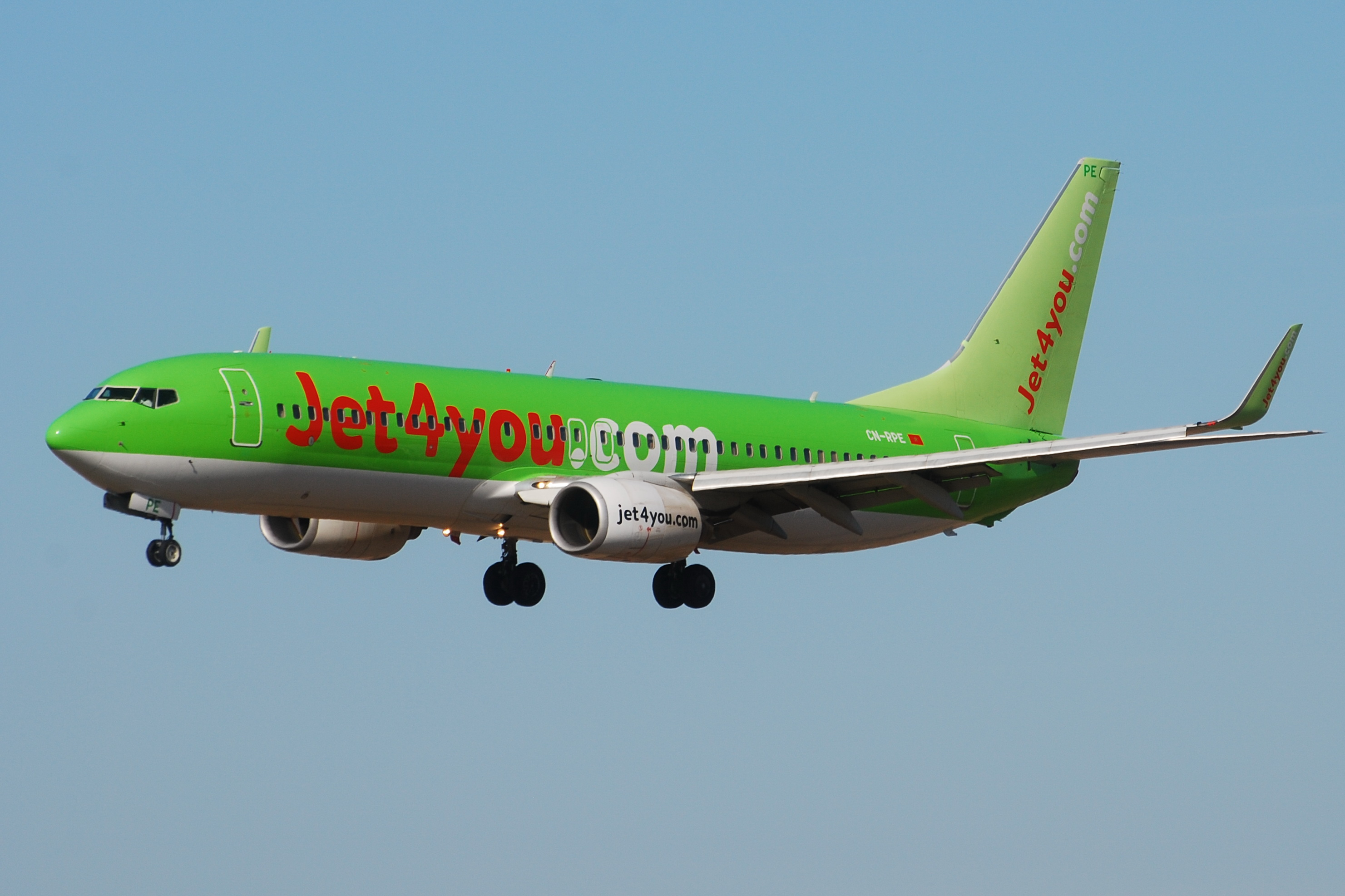
Jet4you Boeing 737-800

=== Launch ===
The airline started operations on 26 February 2006. It was owned by TUI Travel (40%), Attijariwafa Bank (20%), Investima-SGMB (20%) and MM.Marrache et Benabbes Taarji (20%). The shareholders jointly established a Moroccan company, Societe d'Investissement Aerienne, the investment vehicle behind the airline.

Jet4You was directed by Jawad Ziyat. The objective was to widen the network to other European countries and reach 1.5 million passengers by 2010, with a fleet of ten aircraft and a 395-strong team.

=== Short-haul flight ban ===
In 2006, Walloon Minister of Transport André Antoine prohibited Jet4you from making a stopover in Liège, Belgium during a Charleroi–Casablanca flight, arguing that short-haul flights of fewer than 100 kilometres caused too much environmental damage. In December 2006, the European Commission confirmed that the ban did not violate any aviation agreements with Morocco, with Commissioner Jacques Barrot stating: 'The national authorities are allowed to take such measures, especially for environmental reasons.' Jet4you sued the Walloon Government, but in November 2008 the Court of First Instance in Namur confirmed the legality of the short-haul ban, rejecting Jet4you's damages claim and ordering the airline to pay 15,000 euros for court proceedings. Minister Antoine marked this as a victory and again urged the Federal Government of Belgium to introduce a countrywide prohibition on short-haul flights (which had been considered by the previous Federal Transport Minister, Renaat Landuyt).

=== Takeover by TUI ===
On 17 June 2008, it was announced that TUI Travel had taken 100% ownership of the airline, and on 18 July 2009, TUI Travel signed a letter of intent to sell a majority stake in Jet4you to Royal Air Maroc.

Jet4you adopted the IATA code 8J from the now defunct Russian airline Komiinteravia. (This code was subsequently removed from Jet4you and assigned to Línea Aérea EcoJet S.A.)

On 10 January 2012, it was announced that Jet4you would be completely integrated into the Belgian company Jetairfly (now called TUI fly Belgium). Jetairfly took over all aircraft, personnel and routes from Jet4you. The integration into Jetairfly was finalised in 2012, and all operations transferred in April 2012. All aircraft are now in Jetairfly colours, and all flights are booked through Jetairfly.

== Fleet ==
Jet4You ceased operations in 2011, and merged with Jetairfly. For some other fleet information, see JetairFly's fleet.
