= Ust-Tsilma Airport =

- IATA: UTS; ICAO: UUYX

Summary
- Airport type: Public
- Serves: Ust-Tsilma
- Location: Ust-Tsilma
- Elevation AMSL: 262 ft / 80 m
- Coordinates: 65°26′0″N 52°11′56″E
- Website: komiaviatrans.ru

Maps
- Komi Republic in Russia

- Airport in the Komi Republic

Runways
Direction	Length		Surface
Direction	ft	m	Surface
15/33	4,370	1,332	Concrete

Ust-Tsilma Airport (Komi: Чилимдін Аэропорт (IATA: UTS, ICAO: UUYX)) is an airport in the Komi Republic, Russia, located 2 kilometers (1.2 mi) east of the rural locality of Ust-Tsilma in Ust-Tsilemsky District. Small transport aircraft are serviced. The facility arrangement uses a bare-bones utilitarian layout.

== Airlines and destinations ==
Airlines	Destinations
Komiaviatrans	Syktyvkar

== See also ==
- List of airports in Russia
