= Bakharevka Airport =

Former airport in Perm Krai, Russia

Bakharevka Airport Аэропорт Бахаревка
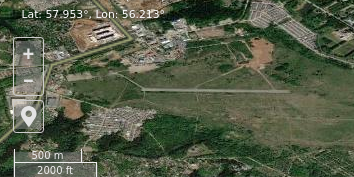
- Satellite imagery of the former Bakharevka air base
- IATA: none; ICAO: USPB

Summary
- Airport type: Military
- Operator: Russian Air Force
- Location: Perm
- Elevation AMSL: 564 ft / 172 m
- Coordinates: 57°57′6″N 56°11′42″E
- Interactive map of Bakharevka Airport

Runways
Direction	Length		Surface
Direction	ft	m	Surface
08/26	2,463	750	Concrete

Bakharevka Airport (Russian: Аэропорт Бахаревка) (ICAO: USPB) was an air base in Perm Krai, Russia, located 6 km southwest of Perm. Until 1965 it was the major civilian airport in Perm City and handled medium-sized and small aircraft, such as the Lisunov Li-2, Ilyushin Il-14, Antonov An-24, Antonov An-2, and Yakovlev Yak-12. After 1965, the major airport was relocated to Bolshoye Savino Airport, which had been a military airfield.

== See also ==
- List of military airbases in Russia
