= Amderma Airport =

Airport in Nenets Autonomous Okrug, Russia

Amderma Амдерма
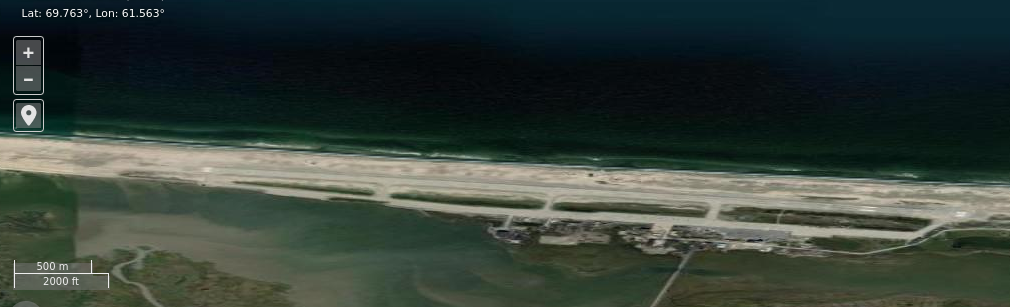
- Satellite imagery of the former Amderma air base

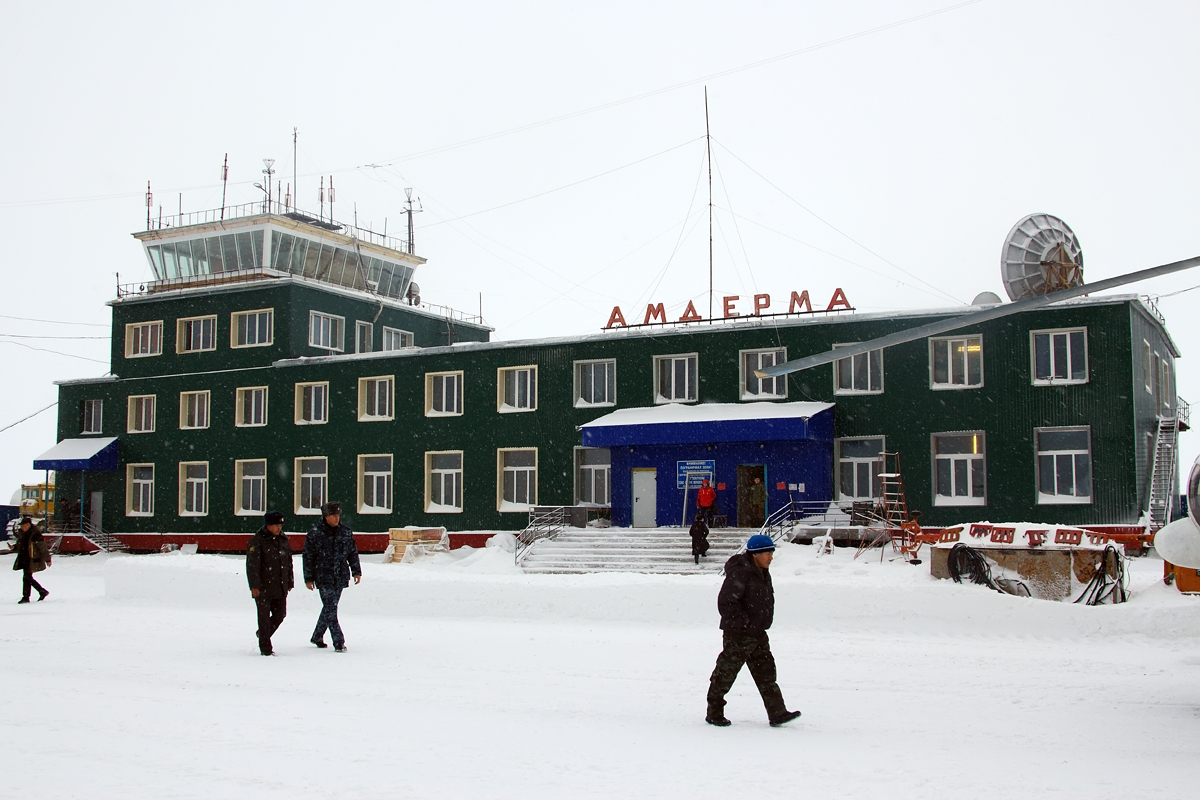
- IATA: AMV; ICAO: ULDD

Summary
- Airport type: public/military
- Operator: Federal State Unitary Enterprise "Airport Amderma"
- Serves: Amderma
- Location: Nenets Autonomous Okrug
- Elevation AMSL: 13 ft / 4 m
- Coordinates: 69°45′48″N 61°33′48″E

Map
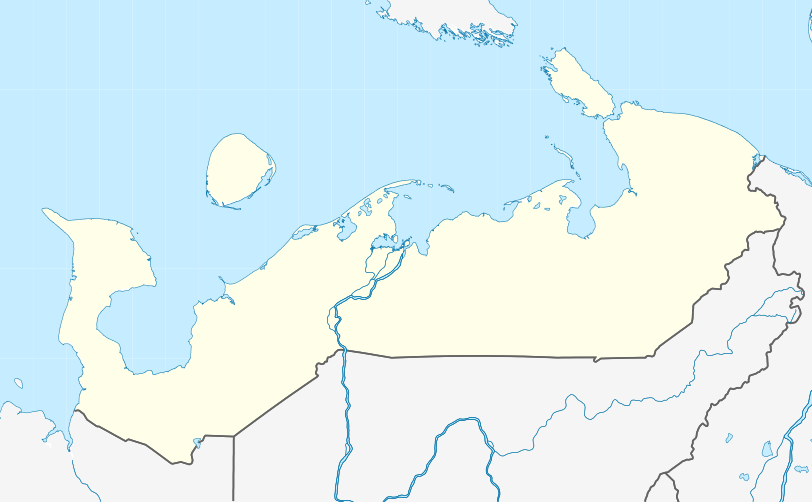

Runways
Direction	Length		Surface
Direction	ft	m	Surface
08/26	8,530	2,600	reinforced concrete

Amderma Airport (IATA: AMV, ICAO: ULDD) is a former interceptor base in Arctic Russia, near Novaya Zemlya, located 4 km west of Amderma (Амдерма). It is a simple airfield built on a spit along the ocean, with some tarmac space.

The facility's prime purpose was to defend the northern approaches to European Russia. Amderma's significance was driven home during the Cold War years when on 1 June 1960 a MiG-19 from Amderma shot down a Boeing RB-47H that was crossing Cape Kanin Nos. Since the 1960s, the airfield has been home to the 72 Guards Interceptor Aviation Regiment (72 Gv IAP) of the 10th Independent Army of the Air Defence Forces, which was operating at least 31 MiG-31 aircraft during the 1991-94 period. Tupolev Tu-128 and MiG-19 were stationed here in the 1960s.

== Airlines and destinations ==
Airlines	Destinations
Smartavia	Naryan-Mar

Nordavia used to operate twice-monthly flights to Arkhangelsk via Naryan-Mar using Antonov An-24 aircraft.

== See also ==
- List of airports in Russia
- List of military airbases in Russia
