= Syktyvkar Southwest Airport =

Syktyvkar Southwest
- IATA: none; ICAO: none

Summary
- Airport type: Public
- Location: Syktyvkar
- Elevation AMSL: 489 ft / 149 m
- Coordinates: 61°35′12″N 50°31′12″E
- Interactive map of Syktyvkar Southwest

Runways
Direction	Length		Surface
Direction	ft	m	Surface
17/35	9,678	2,950	Concrete

Syktyvkar Southwest (Komi: Сыктывкар Йӧн-Пельӧн Аэропорт) is an unfinished and abandoned airport in Komi, Russia located 19 km southwest of Syktyvkar. It was intended to be a civilian airport and was partially constructed in the 1980s, but with the collapse of the Soviet Union and the resulting drop in air passenger traffic, the plans to complete it were dropped. Today, the existing Syktyvkar Airport within city limits continues to serve as the city's air transport gateway.

== See also ==
- List of airports in Russia
