= Yoshkar-Ola Airport =

Airport in Mari El, Russia

Yoshkar-Ola Airport Якшар-Хала Аэропорт
- IATA: JOK; ICAO: UWKJ

Summary
- Airport type: Public
- Operator: GU Mari El Republic "Yoshkar-Ola Airport"
- Serves: Yoshkar-Ola, Mari El Republic, Russia
- Elevation AMSL: 348 ft / 106 m
- Coordinates: 56°42′18″N 47°53′42″E
- Website: https://airport12.ru

Map
- Location of airport in Mari El, Russia

Runways
Direction	Length		Surface
Direction	m	ft	Surface
16/34	2,400	7,874	Asphalt

Yoshkar-Ola Airport (Mari: Якшар-Хала Аэропорт, Russian: Аэропорт Йошкар-Ола) (IATA: JOK, ICAO: UWKJ) is an airport in Mari El Republic, Russia, located 9 kilometres (5.6 mi) north of Yoshkar-Ola and 800 kilometres (500 mi) from Moscow Domodedovo Airport (DME).

As a category 2 airport (based on an MAK classification), it handles Tupolev Tu-134, Yakovlev Yak-42 and smaller aircraft.

The airport is the base for Yoshkar-Ola Joint Aviation Group.

== Airlines and destinations ==
All flights from the Airport are temporarily suspended since 29 September 2023 due to runway reconstruction.

Previously following flights were operated from the Airport:

Airlines	Destinations
RusLine	Moscow–Vnukovo, Saint Petersburg (both suspended)

== See also ==
- List of airports in Russia
