= Ivanovo Yuzhny Airport =

Airport in Ivanano, Russia

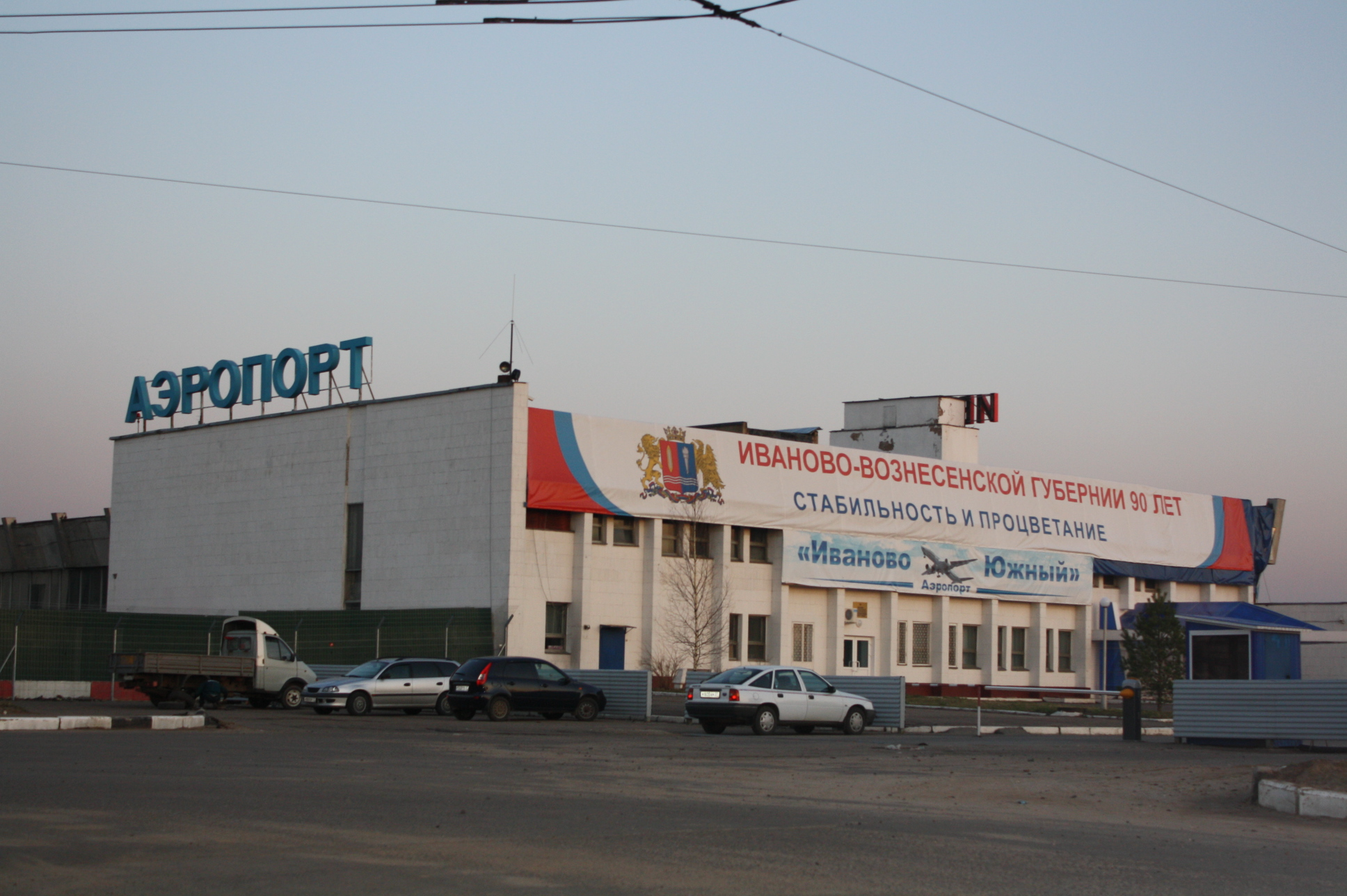
- IATA: IWA; ICAO: UUBI

Summary
- Airport type: Public
- Serves: Ivanovo
- Location: Ivanovo, Russia
- Elevation AMSL: 410 ft (120 m)
- Coordinates: 56°56′30″N 40°56′00″E
- Website: ivanovoaero.ru

Map
- Location of airport in Ivanovo Oblast

Runways
Direction	Length		Surface
Direction	ft	m	Surface
11/29	8,215	2,504	Asphalt

Ivanovo Yuzhny Airport (Ivanovo South) (Russian: Аэропорт Иваново-Южный) (IATA: IWA, ICAO: UUBI) is an airport in Russia located 7 km southwest of Ivanovo. It is a civilian facility that handles medium-sized airliners. It is not to be confused with the Ivanovo Severny airlift base. In 2023, the annual number of passengers served by the airport exceeded 100,000.

== Airlines and destinations ==
Airlines	Destinations
azimuth	Mineralnye Vody
Ikar	Mineralnye Vody, Kaliningrad, Saint Petersburg
Nordwind Airlines	Seasonal: Makhachkala, Sochi
RusLine	Saint Petersburg

The ICAO airport code "KIWA" is used by Mesa Airport in Maricopa County, Arizona; however, to avoid confusion, the Mesa Airport uses the IATA code "AZA" instead.

== See also ==
- List of airports in Russia
