= Ust-Tsilemsky District =

Ust-Tsilemsky District Усть-Цилемский район (Russian)
- District

Other transcription(s)
  - Komi: Чилимдiн район
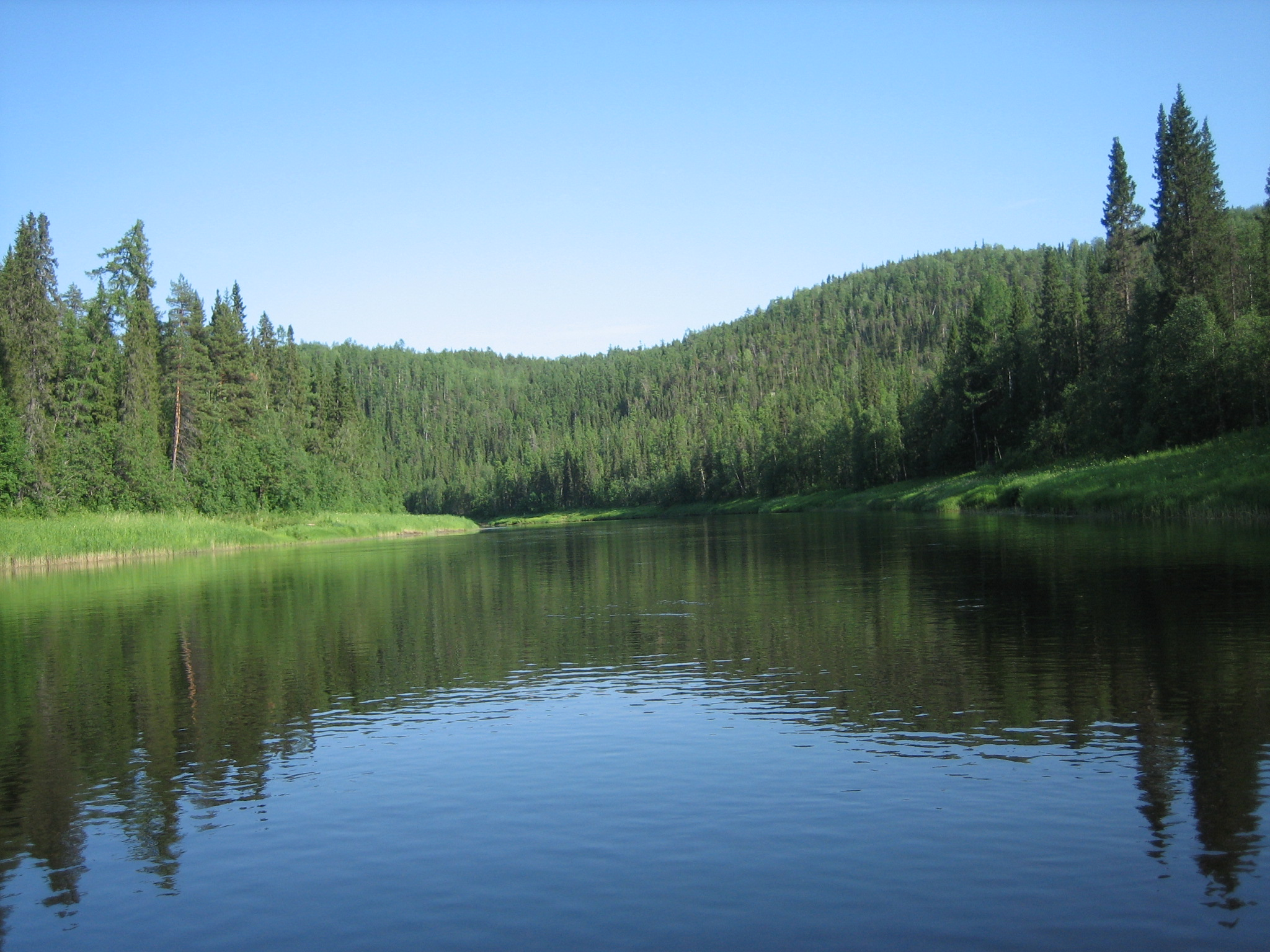
- Pizhma River, a left tributary of the Pechora River, in Ust-Tsilemsky District

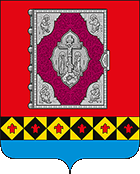
- Flag Coat of arms
- Location of Ust-Tsilemsky District in the Komi Republic
- Coordinates: 65°26′N 52°09′E
- Country: Russia
- Federal subject: Komi Republic
- Established: 1929
- Administrative center: Ust-Tsilma

Area
  - Total: 42,500 km^{2} (16,400 sq mi)

Population (2010 Census)
  - Total: 13,036
  - Density: 0.307/km^{2} (0.794/sq mi)
  - Urban: 0%
  - Rural: 100%

Administrative structure
  - Administrative divisions: 10 Selo administrative territories, 1 Settlement administrative territories
  - Inhabited localities: 37 rural localities

Municipal structure
  - Municipally incorporated as: Ust-Tsilemsky Municipal District
  - Municipal divisions: 0 urban settlements, 11 rural settlements
- Time zone: UTC+3 (MSK)
- OKTMO ID: 87652000
- Website: http://ust-cilma.ru

Population of Ust-Tsilemsky District
- 2010 Census: 13,036
- 2002 Census: 15,408
- 1989 Census: 16,557
- 1979 Census: 17,088

Ust-Tsilemsky District (Russian: Усть-Ци́лемский райо́н; Komi: Чилимдiн район, Ćilimdïn rajon) is an administrative district (raion), one of the twelve in the Komi Republic, Russia. It is located in the northwest of the republic. The area of the district is 42,500 square kilometers (16,400 sq mi). Its administrative center is the rural locality (a selo) of Ust-Tsilma. As of the 2010 Census, the total population of the district was 13,036, with the population of Ust-Tsilma accounting for 37.4% of that number.

== Geography ==
The district's administrative center is located on the Pechora River across from the mouths of both the Tsilma and Pizhma Rivers.

== Administrative and municipal status ==
Within the framework of administrative divisions, Ust-Tsilemsky District is one of the twelve in the Komi Republic. The district is divided into ten selo administrative territories and one settlement administrative territory, which comprise thirty-seven rural localities. As a municipal division, the district is incorporated as Ust-Tsilemsky Municipal District. Its eleven administrative territories are incorporated as eleven rural settlements within the municipal district. The selo of Ust-Tsilma serves as the administrative center of both the administrative and municipal district.
