= Perm International Airport =

Airport in Bolshoye Savino, Russia

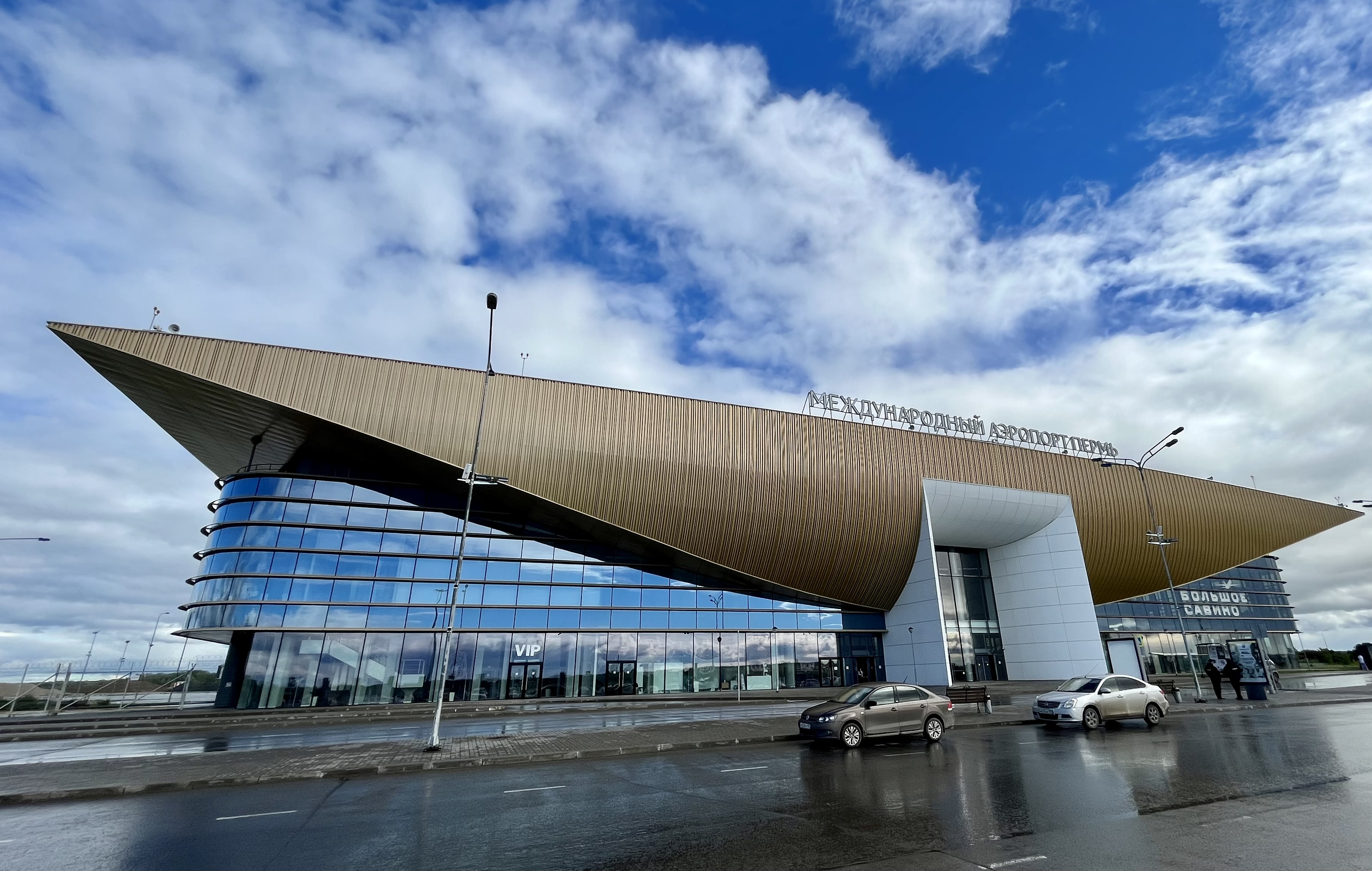
- IATA: PEE; ICAO: USPP

Summary
- Airport type: Public/Military
- Operator: Novaport; Russian Aerospace Forces
- Serves: Perm, Perm Krai, Russia
- Built: 1952
- Elevation AMSL: 397 ft (121 m)
- Coordinates: 57°54′52″N 56°01′16″E
- Website: www.aviaperm.ru

Map
- Location of the airport in Perm Krai Location of the airport in Russia Location of the airport in Europe

Runways
Direction	Length		Surface
Direction	m	ft	Surface
03/21	3,206	10,518	Asphalt

Statistics (2018)
- Passengers: 1,519,617
- Sources: Russian Federal Air Transport Agency (see also provisional 2018 statistics)

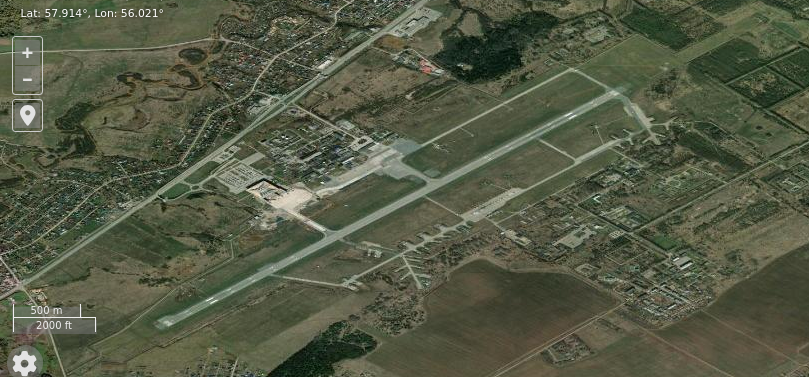
Satellite imagery of Perm International Airport

Perm International Airport (Russian: Международный аэропорт Пермь) (IATA: PEE, ICAO: USPP) is an international airport located at Bolshoye Savino, 16 kilometres (9.9 mi) southwest of the city of Perm, Russia. It is the only airport in Perm Krai with scheduled commercial flights, and serves as Perm's main civilian airport, with bus and minibus services operating during the daytime to the city's main bus terminus.

Perm International is a joint civil-military airfield, hosting a small number of Mikoyan MiG-31 (NATO: Foxhound) fighters of the Russian Aerospace Forces operated by the 764th Fighter Aviation Regiment which is part of the 21st Composite Aviation Division which is part of the 14th Air and Air Defence Forces Army.

== History ==
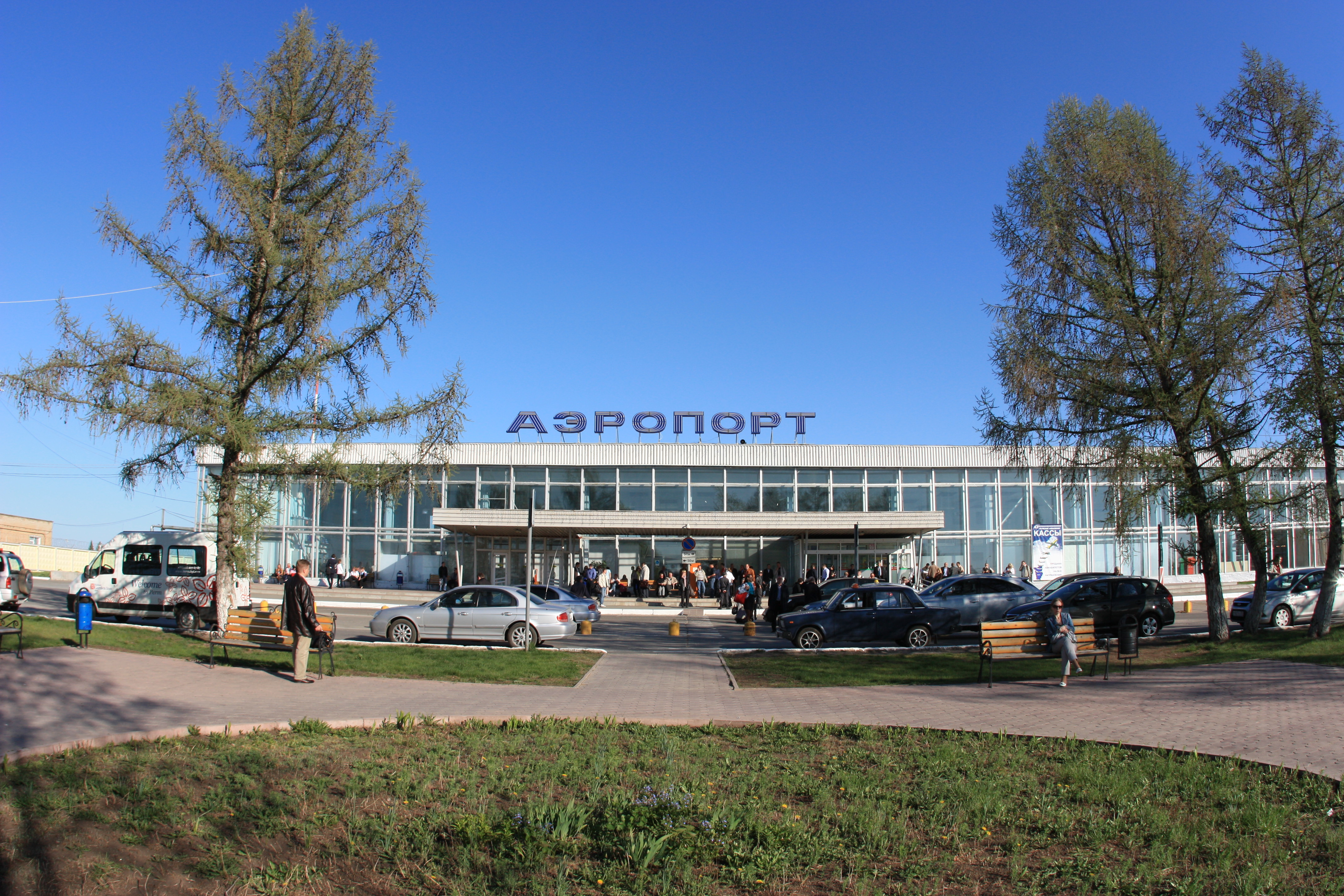
Defunct old terminal

Perm International Airport was first constructed in 1952 as Bolshoye Savino Airport under the personal control of Field Marshal Georgy Zhukov, a national hero in the Soviet Union for his actions as a commander during World War II. Zhukov was later exiled by Joseph Stalin after the war into the Urals to take command of the Ural Military District, constructing the airfield for the Soviet Air Force in the village of Bolshoye Savino, on the outskirts of the city of Perm.

On 1 May 1960, Boris Ajvazyan and Sergei Safronov, two pilots of the 764th Fighter Aviation Regiment involved in the interception of the United States U-2 spy aircraft, were stationed at Bolshoye Savino. During the incident, Safronov was accidentally killed by friendly fire while piloting his MiG-19, which had been scrambled to intercept the U-2 piloted by Gary Powers. A Soviet SAM site fired a salvo of S-75 Dvina missiles at the U-2, downing it, but the strike was mistakenly read to be a miss. Another salvo was fired, however, Safronov was accidentally targeted due to his plane having outdated IFF codes.

In 1965, Bolshoye Savino became the main civilian airport for Perm, replacing the nearby Bakharevka Airport. It was re-purposed as a joint civil-military airport, and began servicing medium-sized airliners with 39 parking spots, a terminal and a cargo area. During the Cold War, the airfield operated up to 38 MiG-25 interceptors, with a number of Yak-25, and Yak-28 aircraft and received modern MiG-31s in 1991. In 2002, the runway was lengthened from 2,500 to 3,200 meters.

=== Reconstruction and new terminal ===
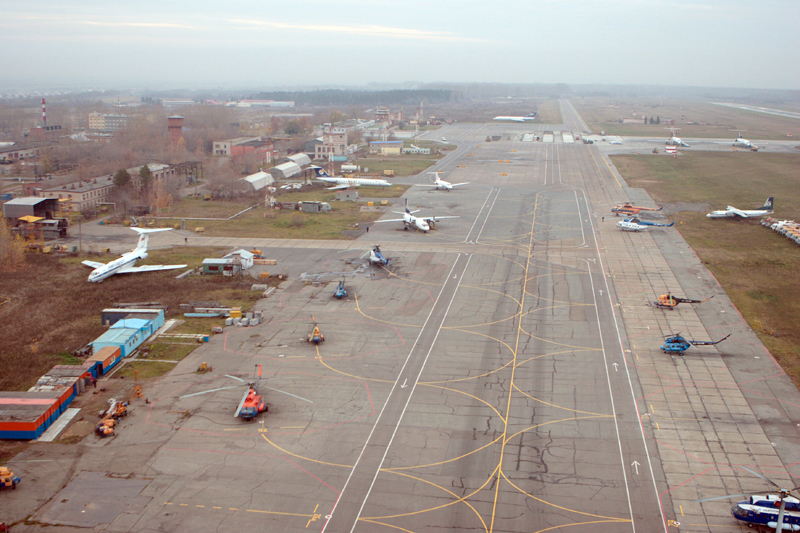
Apron view

==== Phase 1 ====
In 2012, with increasing traffic and the need for regional flights, the government started making plans for an improvement project that would include a new passenger terminal with an annual capacity of 2 million passengers by 2020, as well as other minor improvements. Further expansion by 2035 was going to include doubling the floor area of the terminal, as well as building multi-level car parks, office space, hotels, a shopping mall and an aircraft hangar. Perm citizens have chosen to retain the name "Bolshoye Savino" for the new terminal.

The new terminal was officially opened on 30 November 2017. International flights are currently served by the old terminal. The first international flights were expected to be launched in March 2018.

==== Phase 2 ====
Currently, the boarding on the aircraft is done by apron buses, but jet bridges are planned to be installed. This phase was scheduled to be finished in 2019, but due to heavy rains during spring and summer, there is a delay in construction process.

== Airlines and destinations ==
Airlines	Destinations
Aeroflot	Moscow–Sheremetyevo, Sochi; Seasonal: Antalya
Air Cairo	Seasonal charter: Sharm El Sheikh
AlMasria Universal Airlines	Seasonal charter: Hurghada, Sharm El Sheikh
Azimuth	Krasnodar, Makhachkala, Mineralnye Vody
Azur Air	Seasonal charter: Antalya, Goa-Dabolim, Phuket
Centrum Air	Tashkent
Ikar	Kaliningrad, Sochi
IrAero	Baku
Nordstar Airlines	Kazan, Norilsk
Nordwind Airlines	Sochi; Seasonal: Makhachkala
Pobeda	Moscow–Sheremetyevo, Moscow–Vnukovo, Saint Petersburg; Seasonal: Sochi
Red Wings Airlines	Minsk; Seasonal: Batumi
Rossiya	Krasnoyarsk–International, Saint Petersburg; Seasonal charter: Hurghada, Sharm El Sheikh
RusLine	Naryan-Mar, Perm
S7 Airlines	Novosibirsk
Shirak Avia	Yerevan
Sky Vision Airlines	Seasonal charter: Sharm El Sheikh
Smartavia	Seasonal: Saint Petersburg, Sochi
Southwind Airlines	Seasonal charter: Antalya
Utair	Kogalym, Surgut, Tyumen
UVT Aero	Gorno-Altaysk, Kazan, Naryan-Mar, Nizhnevartovsk, Novy Urengoy, Samara, Tashkent, Usinsk; Seasonal: Petrozavodsk
Uzbekistan Airways	Namangan

== Statistics ==
=== Busiest domestic routes ===
Top 5 scheduled domestic destinations (2024)
Rank	City	Region	Passengers	Share of Total traffic
1	Moscow	Moscow; Moscow Oblast	912,500	46.8%
2	Sochi	Krasnodar Krai	303,700	15.6%
3	Saint Petersburg	Saint Petersburg; Leningrad Oblast	277,600	14.2%
4	Novosibirsk	Novosibirsk Oblast	49,100	2.5%
5	Makhachkala	Dagestan	34,800	1.8%

=== Busiest international routes ===
Top 5 scheduled international destinations (2024)
Rank	City	Country	Passengers	Share of Total traffic
1	Antalya	Turkey	114,300	5.9%
2	Sharm El Sheikh	Egypt	17,600	0.9%
3	Namangan	Uzbekistan	16,100	0.8%
4	Minsk	Belarus	13,600	0.7%
5	Hurghada	Egypt	13,500	0.7%

== Accidents ==
- Aeroflot Flight 821, operated by Aeroflot-Nord in a service agreement with Aeroflot, crashed on approach on 14 September 2008, killing all 88 people on board. One of the pilots was found to be intoxicated by alcohol.

== See also ==
- List of the busiest airports in Russia
- List of the busiest airports in Europe
- List of the busiest airports in the former USSR
- List of military airbases in Russia
