= Ust-Tsilma =

Ust-Tsilma Усть-Цильма
- Selo
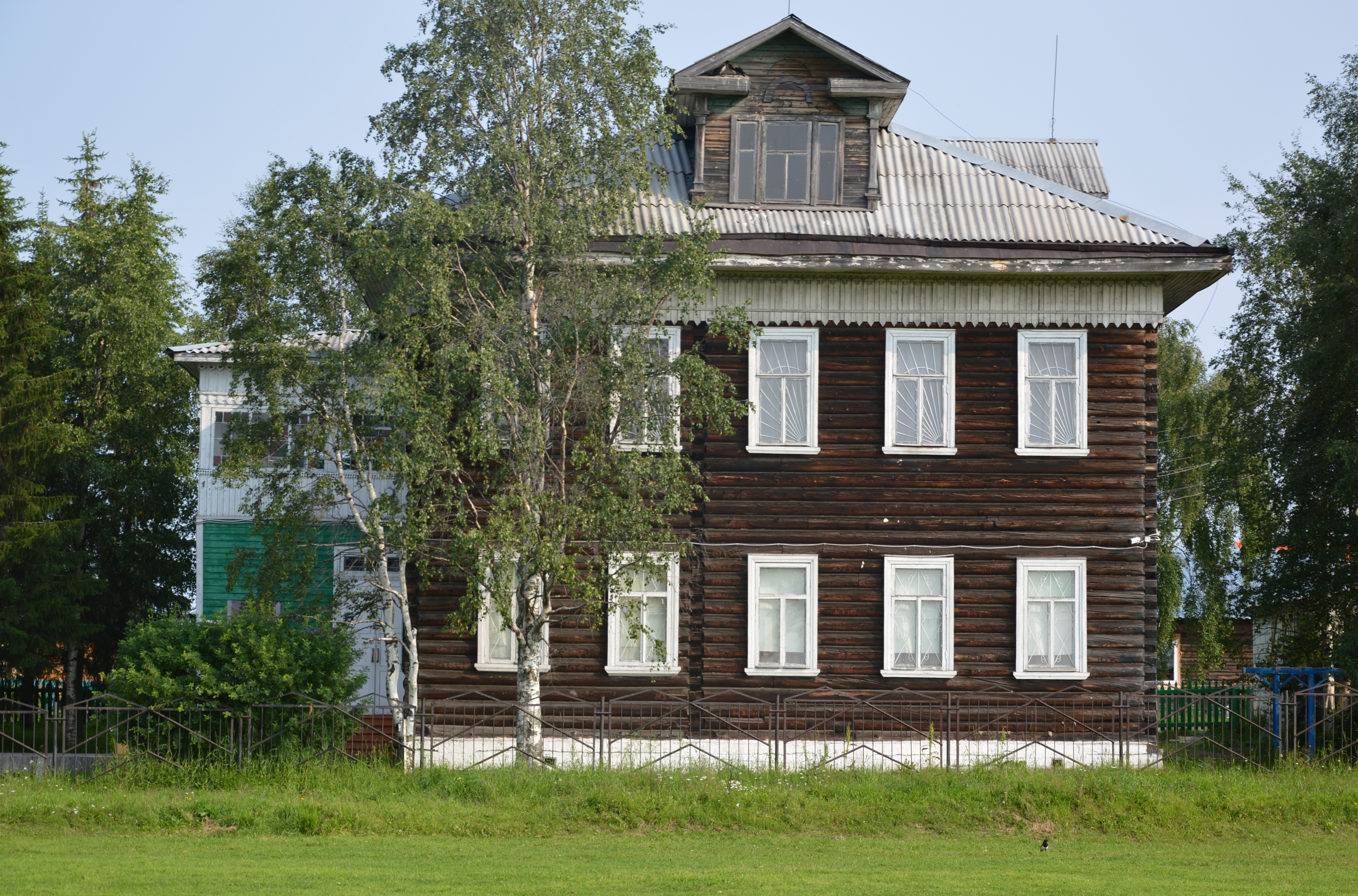
- The Main building of the Pechora Experimental Agricultural Station

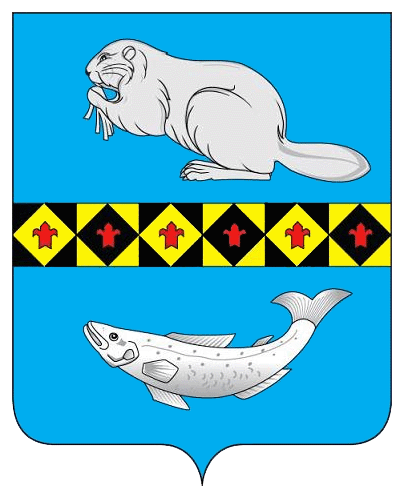
- Coat of arms
- Interactive map of Ust-Tsilma
- Location of Ust-Tsilma Ust-Tsilma (Komi Republic)
- Coordinates: 65°26′N 52°09′E
- Country: Russia
- Federal subject: Komi Republic
- Administrative district: Ust-Tsilemsky District
- Founded: 1542 (Julian)

Population (2010 Census)
  - Total: 4,877
  - Estimate (2021): 4,331 (−11.2%)

Administrative status
  - Capital of: Ust-Tsilemsky District
- Time zone: UTC+3 (MSK)
- Postal code: 169480
- OKTMO ID: 87652440101

Ust-Tsilma (Russian: Усть-Ци́льма, Komi: Чилимдін, Ćilimdïn) is a rural locality (a selo) and the administrative center of Ust-Tsilemsky District of the Komi Republic, Russia, located where the Tsilma River enters the Pechora River. Population: 4,877 (2010 census); 5,081 (2002 census); 5,344 (1989 Soviet census).

== Transportation ==
It is served by the Ust-Tsilma Airport.

== Climate ==
Ust-Tsilma has a subarctic climate (Köppen climate classification Dfc). Winters are very cold with average temperatures from −20.7 to −13.2 °C (−5.3 to 8.2 °F) in January, while summers are mild with average temperatures from +11.0 to +20.9 °C (51.8 to 69.6 °F). Precipitation is moderate and is somewhat higher in summer than at other times of the year.

Climate data for Ust-Tsilma
Month	Jan	Feb	Mar	Apr	May	Jun	Jul	Aug	Sep	Oct	Nov	Dec	Year
Record high °C (°F)	3.1 (37.6)	3.6 (38.5)	12.1 (53.8)	24.1 (75.4)	32.2 (90.0)	32.7 (90.9)	33.6 (92.5)	32.3 (90.1)	26.1 (79.0)	18.9 (66.0)	9.2 (48.6)	3.8 (38.8)	33.6 (92.5)
Mean daily maximum °C (°F)	−12.7 (9.1)	−11.1 (12.0)	−3.5 (25.7)	3.3 (37.9)	10.6 (51.1)	17.4 (63.3)	21.0 (69.8)	16.7 (62.1)	10.9 (51.6)	2.5 (36.5)	−5.4 (22.3)	−9.5 (14.9)	3.4 (38.0)
Daily mean °C (°F)	−16.3 (2.7)	−14.8 (5.4)	−8.0 (17.6)	−1.5 (29.3)	5.2 (41.4)	11.8 (53.2)	15.5 (59.9)	12.0 (53.6)	7.1 (44.8)	0.2 (32.4)	−8.2 (17.2)	−12.7 (9.1)	−0.8 (30.6)
Mean daily minimum °C (°F)	−19.8 (−3.6)	−18.4 (−1.1)	−12.0 (10.4)	−5.6 (21.9)	0.9 (33.6)	7.3 (45.1)	10.8 (51.4)	8.2 (46.8)	4.1 (39.4)	−2.0 (28.4)	−11.0 (12.2)	−16.0 (3.2)	−4.5 (24.0)
Record low °C (°F)	−51.1 (−60.0)	−46.7 (−52.1)	−43.8 (−46.8)	−33.3 (−27.9)	−20.3 (−4.5)	−6.8 (19.8)	−0.1 (31.8)	−6.4 (20.5)	−11.2 (11.8)	−25.7 (−14.3)	−43.4 (−46.1)	−51.5 (−60.7)	−51.5 (−60.7)
Average precipitation mm (inches)	35.3 (1.39)	26.4 (1.04)	27.4 (1.08)	29.0 (1.14)	44.0 (1.73)	64.5 (2.54)	61.7 (2.43)	71.4 (2.81)	63.6 (2.50)	61.4 (2.42)	43.5 (1.71)	38.1 (1.50)	566.3 (22.29)
Average rainy days	1	1	3	9	16	19	19	22	23	16	5	2	136
Average snowy days	24	21	21	11	5	1	0	0	1	11	21	25	141
Average relative humidity (%)	82	81	77	69	66	66	73	80	84	87	86	84	78
Mean monthly sunshine hours	10	52	115	194	230	275	277	178	95	43	14	5	1,488
Source 1: pogoda.ru.net
Source 2: NOAA (sun only, 1961-1990)
