= Usinsk Airport =

Airport in Komi, Russia

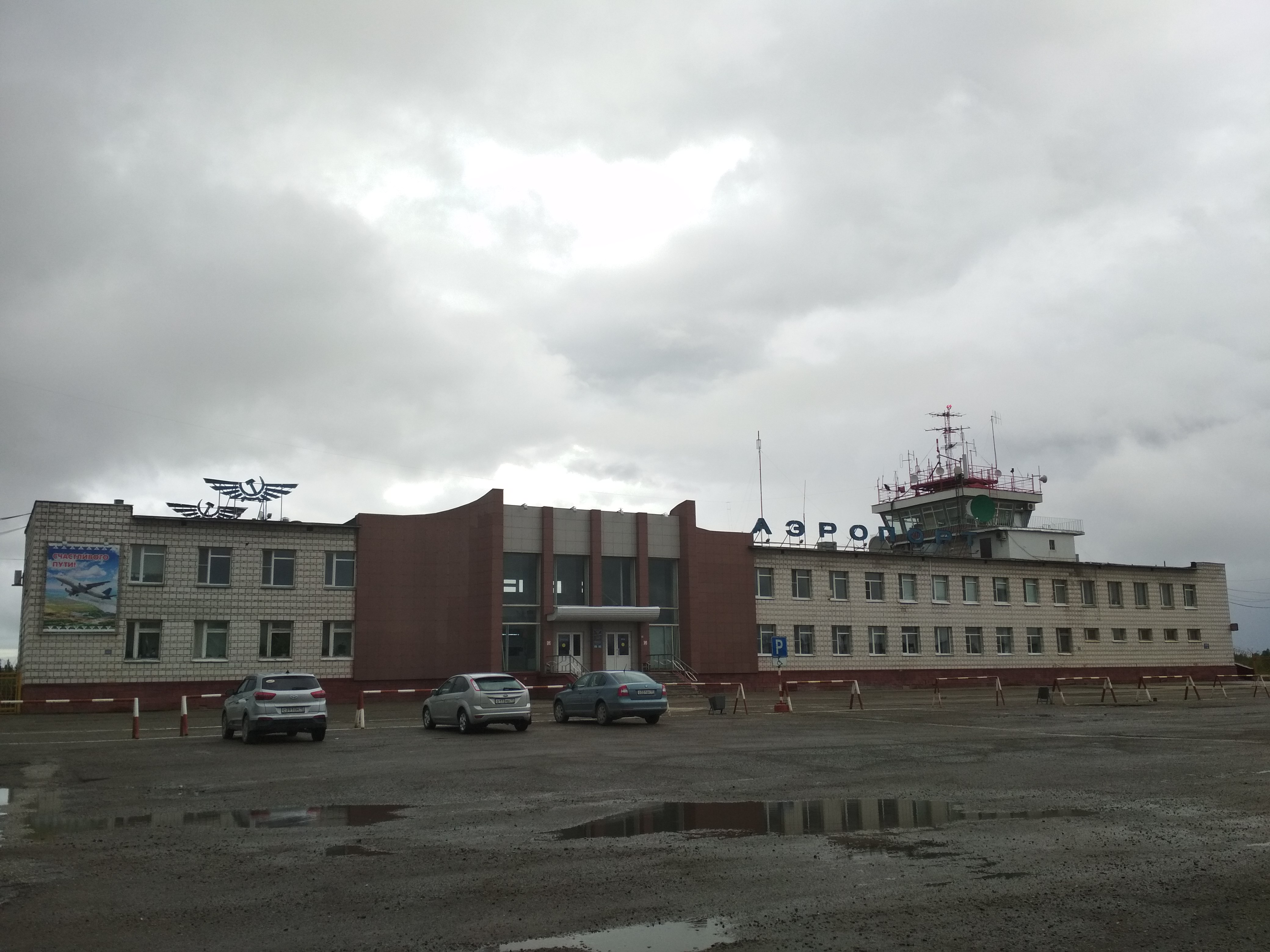
- IATA: USK; ICAO: UUYS

Summary
- Airport type: Public
- Serves: Usinsk
- Location: Usinsk, Russia
- Elevation AMSL: 262 ft / 80 m
- Coordinates: 66°0′0″N 57°22′0″E
- Website: www.komiaviatrans.ru

Map
- Location of airport in Komi Republic

Runways
Direction	Length		Surface
Direction	ft	m	Surface
13/31	8,209	2,502	Asphalt

Usinsk Airport (Komi: Ускар Аэропорт, (IATA: USK, ICAO: UUYS)) is an airport in Komi, Russia located 8 km west of Usinsk. It services medium-size airliners.

== Airlines and destinations ==
Airlines	Destinations
Komiaviatrans	Syktyvkar (suspended)
UVT Aero	Bugulma, Kazan, Moscow–Vnukovo, Perm, Kumuroch, Ufa

== See also ==
- List of airports in Russia
