= Kaluga (Grabtsevo) Airport =

International airport in Kaluga, Russia

Kaluga (Grabtsevo) Airport Аэропорт Калуга (Грабцево)

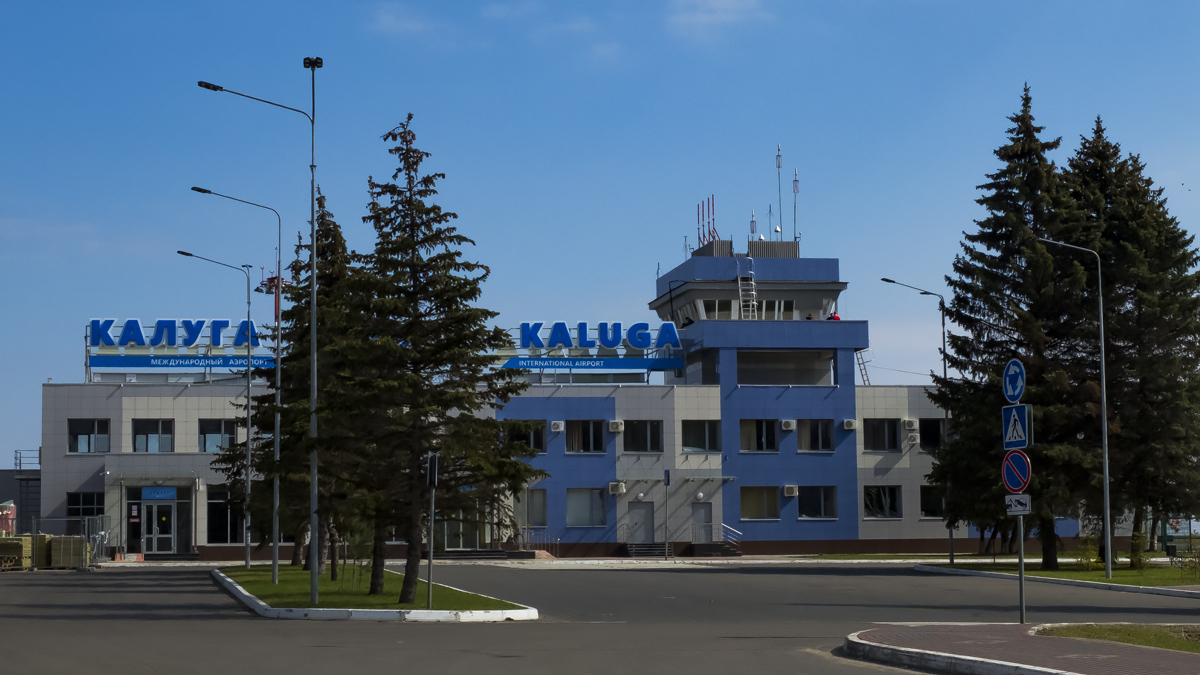
- International Airport Kaluga. 2015
- IATA: KLF; ICAO: UUBC

Summary
- Airport type: Public / private
- Owner: Ministry for Economic Development of Region
- Operator: JSC "International airport Kaluga"
- Location: Kaluga
- Elevation AMSL: 666 ft (203 m)
- Coordinates: 54°32′48″N 36°22′8″E
- Website: klf.aero

Map
- Location within Kaluga Oblast

Runways
Direction	Length		Surface
Direction	m	ft	Surface
13/31	2,200	7,218	asphalt

Kaluga (Grabtsevo) Airport (Russian: Аэропорт Калуга "Грабцево") (IATA: KLF, ICAO: UUBC) is an international airport, located 6 kilometres (3.7 mi) northeast of Kaluga, Russia.

The airport is currently (as of 11 November 2014) 100% owned by the Ministry for Economic Development of Kaluga Oblast.

== History ==
The airport was closed in 2001 due to lack of funding. In 2009 the ownership was transferred from the Russian federal government to the regional government. Reconstruction of the terminal building and the runway began in 2012 after all planning had been completed. The first test flight had been accepted in the airport on 18 December 2014.

The official opening was on 27 May 2015.

Restricted area UU-R56 is located just southwest of the airfield over part of Kaluga town.

In 2008, news media announced that Volkswagen Rus OOO (the Russian subsidiary of the German automotive industry conglomerate and holding company Volkswagen Group) is ready to invest between 400 and 500 million rubles into the airport. Volkswagen Air Services charter flights to Braunschweig Airport near Wolfsburg, and Ruzyně Airport, Prague, are planned to start in 2015.

== Airlines and destinations ==
Airlines	Destinations
azimuth	Mineralnye Vody, Saint Petersburg (all flights suspended until 23 March 2027)

== See also ==
- List of airports in Russia
