= Ukhta Airport =

Airport in Ukhta, Russia

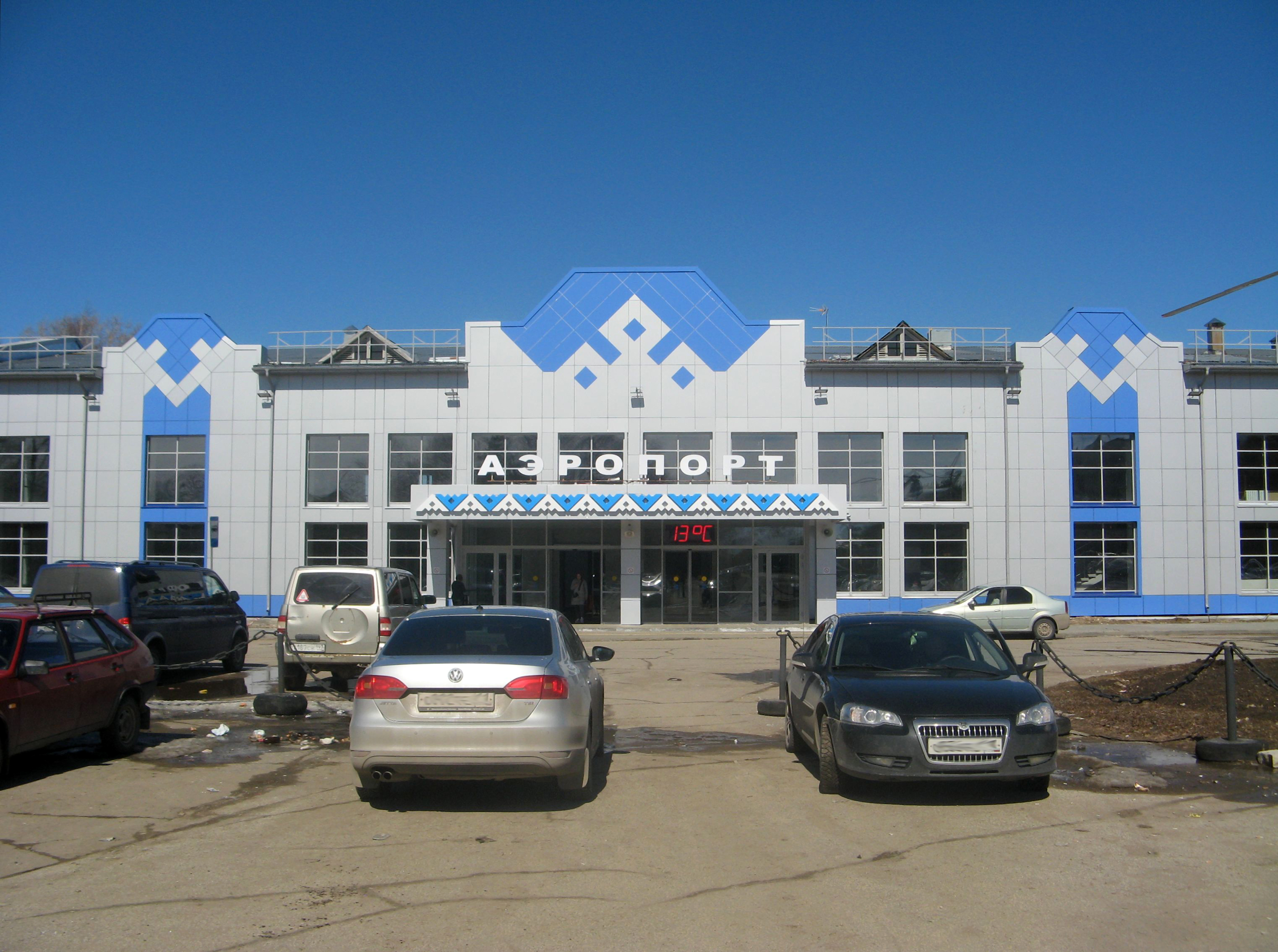
- IATA: UCT; ICAO: UUYH

Summary
- Airport type: Public
- Serves: Ukhta
- Location: Ukhta, Russia
- Elevation AMSL: 482 ft / 147 m
- Coordinates: 63°34′0″N 53°48′12″E
- Website: komiaviatrans.ru
- Interactive map of Ukhta Airport

Runways
Direction	Length		Surface
Direction	ft	m	Surface
18/36	8,694	2,650	Asphalt

Ukhta Airport (also referred to as Ust Ukhta) (Komi: Уква Аэропорт, (IATA: UCT, ICAO: UUYH)) is a civilian airport in Russia located 5 km east of Ukhta (near Sosnogorsk). It services medium-sized airliners.

== Airlines and destinations ==
Airlines	Destinations
Severstal Air Company	Moscow-Sheremetyevo, Saint Petersburg
Utair	Moscow-Vnukovo

== See also ==
- List of airports in Russia
