= Vorkuta Airport =

Airport in Komi Republic, Russia

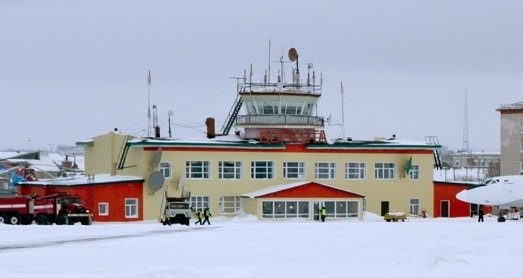
- IATA: VKT; ICAO: UUYW

Summary
- Airport type: Public
- Operator: Vorkuta branch of FSUE "Komiaviatrans"
- Location: Vorkuta
- Elevation AMSL: 604 ft (184 m)
- Coordinates: 67°29′18″N 063°59′24″E
- Website: www.komiaviatrans.ru/airport

Maps
- Komi Republic in Russia

- Airport in the Komi Republic

Runways
Direction	Length		Surface
Direction	ft	m	Surface
08/26	6,217	1,900	Asphalt

Vorkuta Airport (Komi: Вӧркута Аэропорт, Russian: Аэропорт Воркута) (IATA: VKT, ICAO: UUYW) is a small airport in the Komi Republic, Russia located 3 km west of Vorkuta. It accommodates small airliners. The pavement length is 2,200 meters; however, it is shortened 300 m due to a displaced threshold.

== Airlines and destinations ==
Airlines	Destinations
Komiaviatrans	Syktyvkar
RusLine	Moscow-Zhukovsky

== See also ==
- Yamburg Airport
- List of airports in Russia
