= Talagi Airport =

Airport in Arkhangelsk, Russia

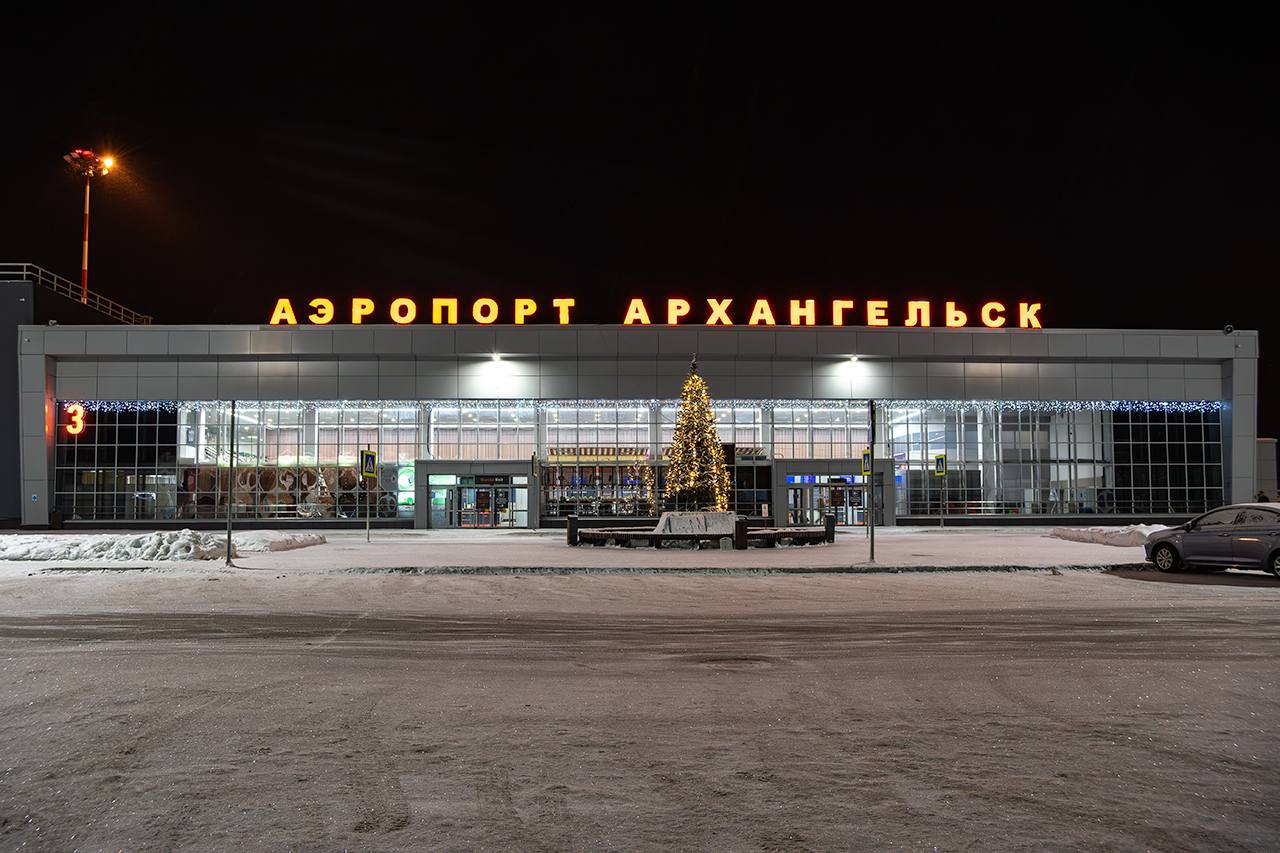
- IATA: ARH; ICAO: ULAA

Summary
- Airport type: Public
- Owner: Federal Agency for State Property Management (51%)
- Operator: JSC "Arkhangelsk Airport"
- Serves: Arkhangelsk
- Location: Arkhangelsk, Arkhangelsk Oblast, Russia
- Hub for: Smartavia
- Elevation AMSL: 62 ft (19 m)
- Coordinates: 64°36′0″N 40°43′0″E
- Website: arhaero.ru

Map
- Location of the airport in Arkhangelsk Oblast Location of the airport in Russia Location of the airport in Europe

Runways
| Direction | Length | | Surface |
| Direction | m | ft | Surface |
|---|---|---|---|
| 08/26 | 2,500 | 8,202 | Concrete |

Statistics (2018)
- Passengers: 942,972
- Sources: Russian Federal Air Transport Agency (see also provisional 2018 statistics)

Talagi Airport (Russian: Аэропорт Архангельск (Тала́ги) имени Ф.А. Абрамова) (IATA: ARH, ICAO: ULAA) is an international airport serving Arkhangelsk, Russia, located 11 kilometers outside the city. In 2001, it had 105,797 passengers and 921 tonnes of cargo. The airport was founded on February 5, 1963. It had an operational peak in 1990 with 952,457 passengers.

Talagi Airport serves as an airline hub for Smartavia.

The airport is home to the 89th Independent Aviation Squadron which uses the Antonov An-26 (ASCC: Curl) and Mil Mi-8MTV-5 (ASCC: Hip) as part of the 45th Air and Air Defence Forces Army.

== History ==
The name Talagi originates in two khutors and small village located in Solombalsky Volost, Arkhangelsk Uyezd, Arkhangelsk Governorate.

Talagi Airport was originally built in the summer of 1942 under the supervision of the State Defense Committee representative Ivan Papanin as a military base with a gravel runway.

The Soviet Air Defence Forces (PVO) had a presence at this airfield with 518th Fighter Aviation Regiment (518-й Берлинский ордена Суворова III степени истребительный авиационный полк (Military Unit Number 42192), 518 IAP) flying Tupolev Tu-128 from 1966 onward. It received MiG-31 aircraft during the 1980s. The controlling formation was the 23rd Air Defence Corps, then redesignated the 22nd Air Defence Corps in 1993, then 22nd AD Division from 1994, all under 10th Air Defence Army until 1994, and then 6th Air Defence Army. The regiment was disbanded in 1998.

== Airlines and destinations ==
| Airlines | Destinations |
|---|---|
| Aeroflot | Moscow–Sheremetyevo |
| Arktika Airlines | Amderma |
| Azur Air | Seasonal charter: Antalya |
| Ikar | Kazan |
| Rossiya | Moscow–Sheremetyevo, Saint Petersburg |
| Severstal Air Company | Cherepovets, Murmansk |
| Smartavia | Kaliningrad, Moscow–Sheremetyevo, Naryan-Mar, Saint Petersburg; Seasonal: Sochi |
| Southwind Airlines | Seasonal charter: Antalya |

== Accidents and incidents ==
- On 12 January 2024, a Yakovlev Yak-42 aircraft, registered RA-42458, belonging to Arktika Airlines (opby Cosmos RKK Energia), operating flight SI9642 from Yuzhny Island, Novaya Zemlya, with 54 passengers and five crew members on board overran the runway during landing. No one was injured.

== See also ==
- List of the busiest airports in Russia
- List of the busiest airports in Europe
- List of the busiest airports in the former USSR
