= Naryan-Mar Airport =

Airport in Naryan-Mar, Russia

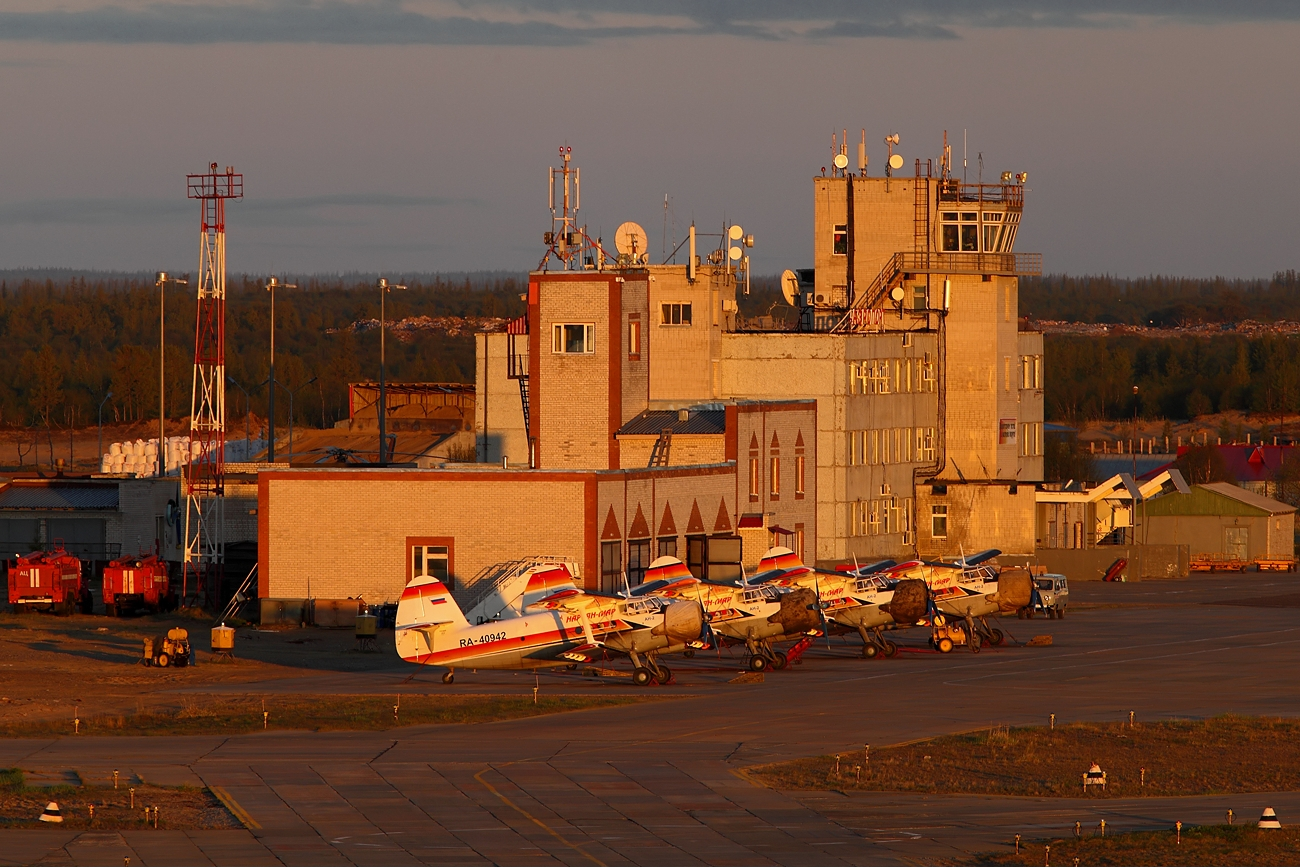
- IATA: NNM; ICAO: ULAM

Summary
- Airport type: Military/public
- Operator: Naryan-Mar United Aviation Squadron
- Serves: Naryan-Mar
- Location: Naryan-Mar, Russia
- Elevation AMSL: 43 ft / 13 m
- Coordinates: 67°38′24″N 53°07′30″E
- Website: https://avianao.ru/

Map
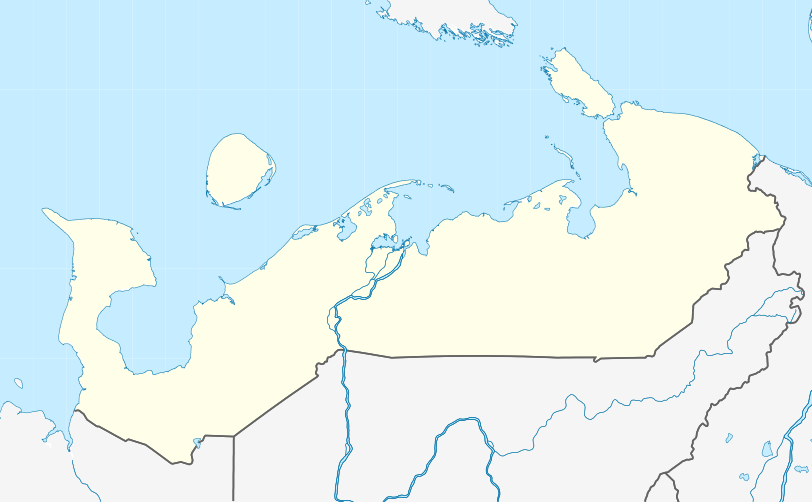

Runways
Direction	Length		Surface
Direction	ft	m	Surface
06/24	8,202	2,500	Concrete

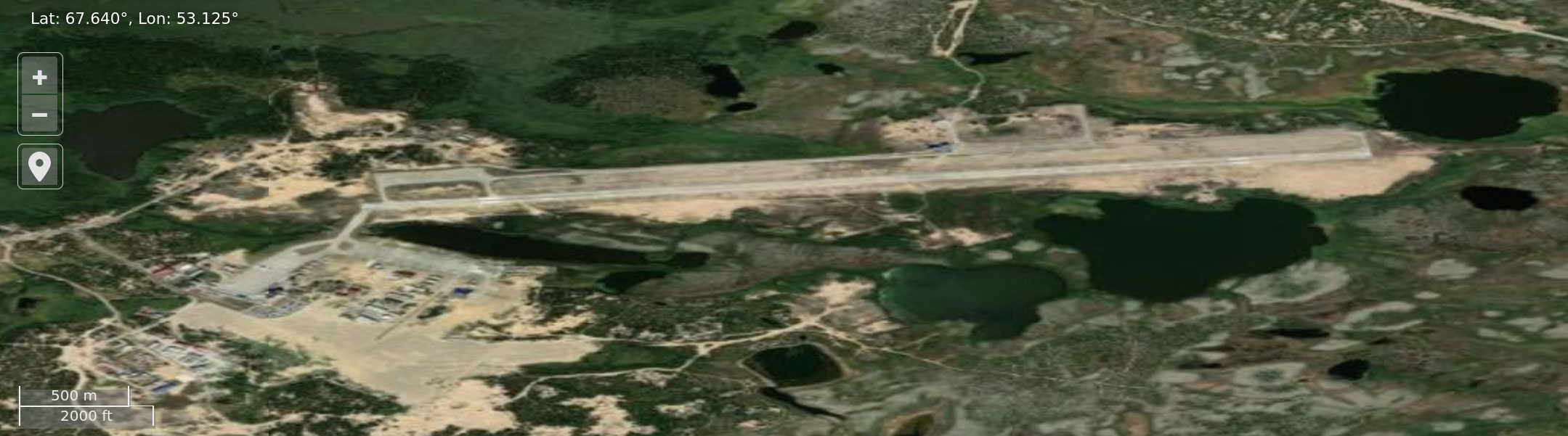
Satellite imagery of Naryan-Mar Airport

Naryan-Mar Airport (Nenets: Няръянa Мар Аэропортыв, Russian: Аэропорт Нарьян-Мар) (IATA: NNM, ICAO: ULAM) is an airport in Russia located 3 km east of Naryan-Mar. It is a mixed civilian-military field, and is the only major facility airfield on the Barents Sea coast between Arkhangelsk and Novaya Zemlya. It served as a rear operations air base for Rogachevo air base on Novaya Zemlya. In 2017, 183,127 passengers traveled via this airport.

== Airlines and destinations ==
Airlines	Destinations
Red Wings Airlines	Seasonal: Makhachkala, Sochi
RusLine	Arkhangelsk–Talagi, Khanty-Mansiysk, Kazan, Kirov, Moscow–Zhukovsky, Perm, Saint Petersburg, Syktyvkar, Ufa, Yaroslavl, Yekaterinburg
Smartavia	Arkhangelsk–Talagi
Utair	Moscow–Vnukovo

== See also ==
- List of airports in Russia
- List of military airbases in Russia
