= Syktyvkar Airport =

Domestic airport in Syktyvkar, Komi Republic, Russia

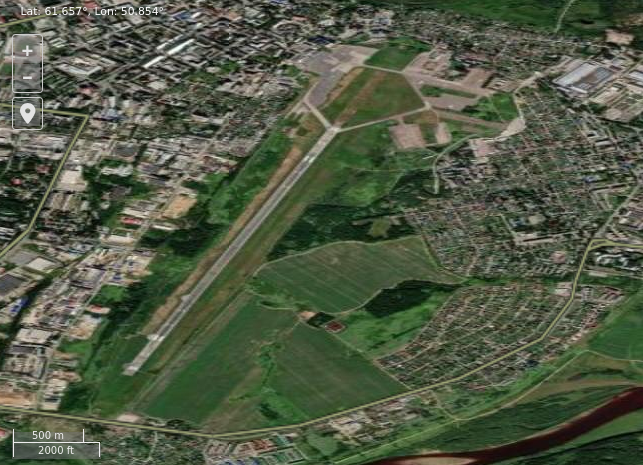
- Satellite imagery of Syktyvkar Airport

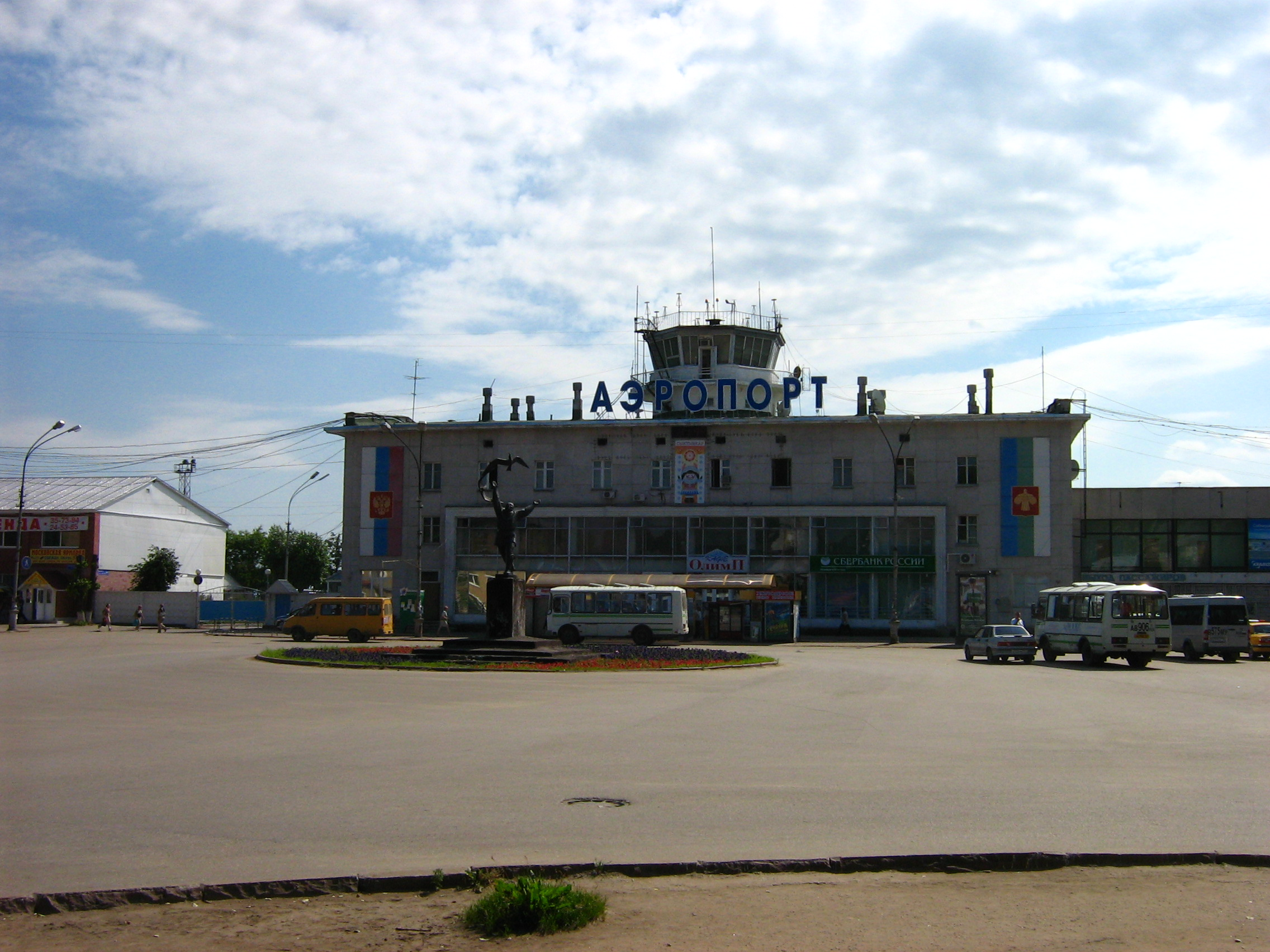
- IATA: SCW; ICAO: UUYY

Summary
- Airport type: Public
- Serves: Syktyvkar
- Location: Syktyvkar, Komi, Russia
- Hub for: Komiaviatrans
- Elevation AMSL: 300 ft / 99 m
- Coordinates: 61°39′26″N 50°51′14″E
- Website: komiaviatrans.ru/airport/

Maps
- Komi Republic in Russia

- Airport in the Komi Republic

Runways
Direction	Length		Surface
Direction	ft	m	Surface
18/36	8,203	2,500	Asphalt

Syktyvkar Airport (Komi: Сыктывкар Войтыркостса Аэропорт, (IATA: SCW, ICAO: UUYY)) is an airport in the Komi Republic, Russia located just within the city of Syktyvkar. It services medium-sized aircraft. The terminal is on the northwest side of the aerodrome with 10 large parking spaces and 9 small ones. The maintenance area is on the northeast side. The airport supports 24-hour operations.

== Airlines and destinations ==
Airlines	Destinations
azimuth	Mineralnye Vody
Azur Air	Seasonal charter: Antalya
Ikar	Sochi
Komiaviatrans	Usinsk, Ust-Tsilma, Vorkuta
Rossiya	Moscow–Sheremetyevo, Saint Petersburg
RusLine	Naryan-Mar, Yekaterinburg
Smartavia	Saint Petersburg; Seasonal: Kaliningrad
Utair	Moscow–Vnukovo

== See also ==
- Syktyvkar Southwest Airport
- List of airports in Russia
