= List of Utair destinations =

List of airline destinations

Utair operates flights to the following scheduled year-round and seasonal destinations:

== Destinations ==
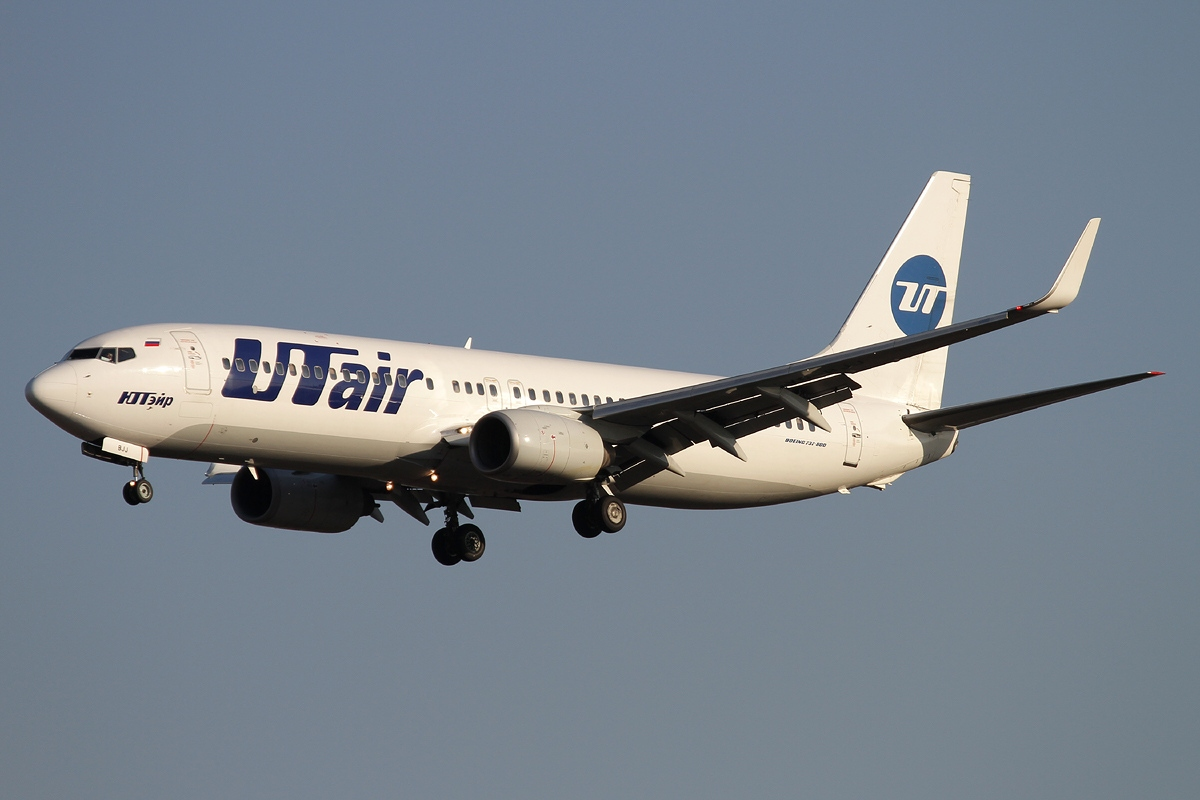
Utair Boeing 737-800

Country	City	Airport	Notes	Ref
Armenia	Yerevan	Zvartnots International Airport		
Azerbaijan	Baku	Heydar Aliyev International Airport		
Azerbaijan	Ganja	Ganja Airport		
Azerbaijan	Nakhchivan	Nakhchivan Airport		
Belarus	Minsk	Minsk National Airport	Terminated	
Croatia	Split	Split Airport	Terminated	
Egypt	Hurghada	Hurghada International Airport	Terminated	
Egypt	Marsa Alam	Marsa Alam International Airport	Terminated	
Egypt	Sharm El Sheikh	Sharm El Sheikh International Airport		
Estonia	Tallinn	Tallinn Airport	Terminated	
Germany	Berlin	Berlin Brandenburg Airport	Terminated	
Germany	Berlin	Berlin Tegel Airport	Airport Closed	
Germany	Munich	Munich Airport	Terminated	
Greece	Heraklion	Heraklion International Airport	Terminated	
Israel	Tel Aviv	Ben Gurion Airport	Terminated	
Italy	Milan	Milan Malpensa Airport	Terminated	
Kyrgyzstan	Bishkek	Manas International Airport		
Latvia	Riga	Riga International Airport	Terminated	
Lithuania	Vilnius	Vilnius International Airport	Terminated	
Russia	Anadyr	Ugolny Airport		
Russia	Anapa	Anapa Airport	Terminated	
Russia	Arkhangelsk	Talagi Airport		
Russia	Belgorod	Belgorod International Airport	Terminated	
Russia	Beloyarsky	Beloyarsk Airport		
Russia	Beryozovo	Beryozovo Airport		
Russia	Blagoveshchensk	Ignatyevo Airport	Terminated	
Russia	Bodaybo	Bodaybo Airport		
Russia	Gelendzhik	Gelendzhik Airport		
Russia	Gorno-Altaysk	Gorno-Altaysk Airport		
Russia	Grozny	Kadyrov Grozny International Airport		
Russia	Igrim	Igrim Airport		
Russia	Irkutsk	Irkutsk International Airport		
Russia	Kaliningrad	Khrabrovo Airport		
Russia	Kaluga	Kaluga (Grabtsevo) Airport	Terminated	
Russia	Kazan	Ğabdulla Tuqay Kazan International Airport		
Russia	Khabarovsk	Khabarovsk Novy Airport	Terminated	
Russia	Khanty-Mansiysk	Khanty-Mansiysk Airport		
Russia	Kogalym	Kogalym International Airport		
Russia	Krasnodar	Pashkovsky Airport		
Russia	Krasnoyarsk	Krasnoyarsk International Airport		
Russia	Kurgan	Kurgan Airport	Terminated	
Russia	Magnitogorsk	Magnitogorsk International Airport		^{*}
Russia	Magas / Nazran	Magas Airport		
Russia	Makhachkala	Uytash airport		
Russia	Mineralnye Vody	Mineralnye Vody Airport		
Russia	Moscow	Moscow Domodedovo Airport	Terminated	
Russia	Moscow	Vnukovo International Airport	Hub	
Russia	Murmansk	Murmansk Airport		
Russia	Mys-Kamenny	Mys-Kamenny Airport		
Russia	Nalchik	Nalchik Airport		
Russia	Nizhnevartovsk	Nizhnevartovsk Airport		
Russia	Nizhny Novgorod	Strigino International Airport		
Russia	Novosibirsk	Tolmachevo Airport		
Russia	Noyabrsk	Noyabrsk Airport		
Russia	Novy Urengoy	Novy Urengoy Airport		
Russia	Nyagan	Nyagan Airport		
Russia	Omsk	Omsk Central Airport		
Russia	Rostov-on-Don	Platov International Airport	Terminated	
Russia	Rostov-on-Don	Rostov-on-Don Airport	Airport Closed	
Russia	Saint Petersburg	Pulkovo Airport		
Russia	Salekhard	Salekhard Airport		
Russia	Samara	Kurumoch International Airport		
Russia	Saratov	Saratov Gagarin Airport		
Russia	Saratov	Saratov Tsentralny Airport	Airport closed	
Russia	Sochi	Adler-Sochi International Airport		
Russia	Sovetsky	Sovetsky Airport		
Russia	Stavropol	Stavropol Shpakovskoye Airport		
Russia	Surgut	Farman Salmanov Surgut Airport	Hub	
Russia	Syktyvkar	Syktyvkar Airport		
Russia	Tomsk	Tomsk Kamov Airport		
Russia	Turukhansk	Turukhansk Airport		
Russia	Tyumen	Roshchino International Airport	Hub	
Russia	Ufa	Mustai Karim Ufa International Airport		
Russia	Ulan-Ude	Baikal International Airport	Terminated	
Russia	Ulyanovsk	Ulyanovsk Baratayevka Airport		
Russia	Uray	Uray Airport		
Russia	Usinsk	Usinsk Airport		
Russia	Ust-Kut	Ust-Kut Airport		
Russia	Vladikavkaz	Beslan Airport		
Russia	Vladivostok	Vladivostok International Airport	Terminated	
Russia	Volgograd	Volgograd International Airport		
Russia	Yakutsk	Yakutsk Airport	Terminated	
Russia	Yekaterinburg	Koltsovo International Airport		
Russia	Yuzhno-Sakhalinsk	Yuzhno-Sakhalinsk Airport	Terminated	
Tajikistan	Dushanbe	Dushanbe International Airport		
Tajikistan	Khujand	Khujand Airport		
Turkey	Antalya	Antalya Airport		
Turkey	Istanbul	Istanbul Atatürk Airport	Airport Closed	
Turkey	Istanbul	Istanbul Airport		
Turkey	Samsun	Samsun-Çarşamba Airport	Terminated	
United Arab Emirates	Dubai	Al Maktoum International Airport		
United Arab Emirates	Dubai	Dubai International Airport	Terminated	
Uzbekistan	Bukhara	Bukhara International Airport		
Uzbekistan	Fergana	Fergana International Airport		
Uzbekistan	Samarqand	Samarqand International Airport		
Uzbekistan	Tashkent	Islam Karimov Tashkent International Airport		
