= Orenburzhye =

Russian airline

IATA	ICAO	Call sign
O7	ORG	ORENBURZHIE
- Founded: 1 April 2013
- Hubs: Orenburg Tsentralny Airport
- Fleet size: 31
- Destinations: 8
- Headquarters: Orenburg, Russia
- Key people: Sergey Kalinovsky (CEO)
- Website: orenairport.ru/eng/ak-orenburzhe

Orenburzhie is a commercial airline headquartered in Orenburg, Russia, on the ground of Orenburg Airport. It serves as regular and charter passenger airline out of Orenburg and Izhevsk Airport. It is currently banned from flying in the EU.

== History ==
On 11 August 2010, the property complex of the airport was separated from the structure of FSUE Orenburg Airlines and the FSUE International Airport Orenburg was registered. An-2 aircraft, Mi-2, Mi-8T, Mi-8P and Ka-226 helicopters were also transferred to the balance of the new enterprise.

To resume regional traffic, three new L-410 aircraft manufactured by Aircraft Industries were purchased on lease (received in February-March 2013), registered and certified, flight and engineering personnel were retrained.

On 4 October 2012 FSUE "International airport" Orenburg "was transferred to the ownership of the Orenburg region and renamed into the State Unitary Enterprise of the Orenburg region" Airport Orenburg ".

On 1 April 2013, the airline commenced flights from Orenburg to Yekaterinburg, Kazan, Nizhny Novgorod, Orsk, Perm, Samara, Tyumen, Ufa, Chelyabinsk, and then from September to Saratov, and finally in October 2013 to Aktobe. On 22 October 2013, the airline was registered as a foreign carrier in the Republic of Kazakhstan, and from November 18 it began operating flights on the Orenburg - Aktobe route.

As of 2017, Orenburzhye was supposed to receive 8 Embraer 190 on lease from Air Canada in favor of a Sukhoi Superjet 100 order, however this never materialized.

== Destinations ==
Orenburzhye serves the following scheduled destinations:

Arkhangelsk Oblast

- Kotlas - Kotlas Airport

Bashkortostan

- Ufa - Ufa International Airport

Belgorod Oblast

- Belgorod - Belgorod International Airport

Chelyabinsk Oblast

- Chelyabinsk - Balandino Airport

Republic of Crimea

- Simferopol - Simferopol Airport

Kaluga Oblast

- Kaluga - Grabtsevo Airport

Karelia

- Petrozavodsk - Besovets Airport

Kirov Oblast

- Kirov - Pobedilovo Airport

Krasnodar Krai

- Anapa - Vityazevo Airport
- Krasnodar - Pashkovsky Airport
- Sochi - Adler-Sochi International Airport

Lipetsk Oblast

- Lipetsk - Lipetsk Airport

Omsk Oblast

- Omsk - Omsk Tsentralny Airport

Orenburg Oblast

- Orenburg - Orenburg Tsentralny Airport Base
- Orsk - Orsk Airport

Perm Krai

- Perm - Bolshoye Savino Airport

Rostov Oblast

- Rostov-on-Don - Rostov-on-Don Airport

Samara Oblast

- Samara - Kurumoch International Airport

Sverdlovsk Oblast

- Yekaterinburg - Koltsovo Airport

Tatarstan

- Kazan - Kazan International Airport
- Nizhnekamsk - Begishevo Airport

Tyumen Oblast

- Khanty-Mansi Autonomous Okrug
  - Nizhnevartovsk - Nizhnevartovsk Airport
  - Uray - Uray Airport

Udmurtia

- Izhevsk - Izhevsk Airport

Volgograd Oblast

- Voronezh - Gumrak Airport

Voronezh Oblast

- Voronezh - Chertovitskoye Airport

Yaroslavl Oblast

- Yaroslavl - Tunoshna Airport

Kazakhstan

- Aktobe - Aktobe Airport

Russia

- Buguruslan - Buguruslan Airfield
- Cheboksary - Cheboksary Airport
- Gelendzhik - Gelendzhik Airport
- Nizhny Novgorod - Strigino Airport
- Nyagan - Nyagan Airport
- Saratov - Saratov Tsentralny Airport
- Stavropol - Shpakovskoye Airport
- Tyumen - Roshchino Airport

== Fleet ==
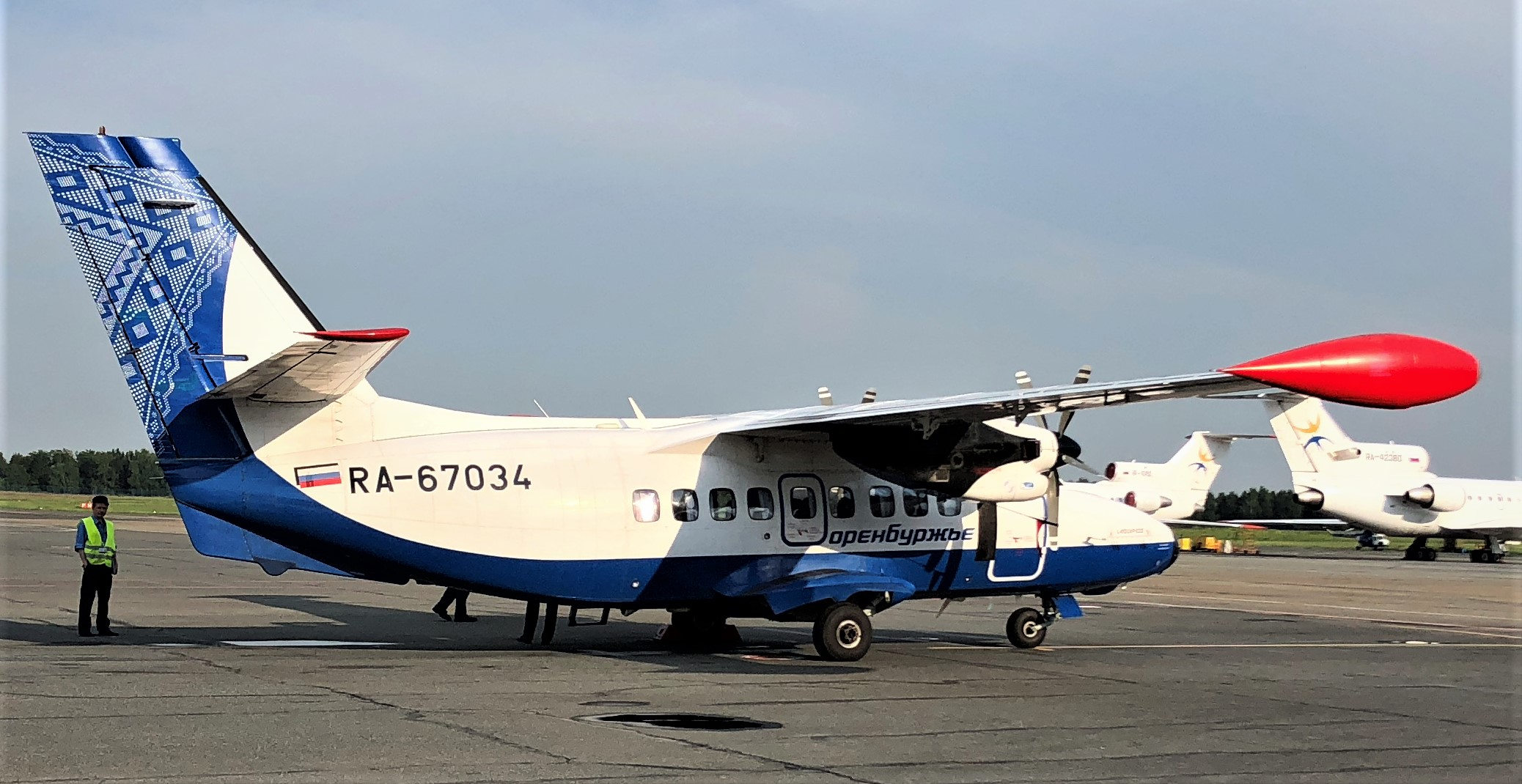
Orenburzhye Let L-410 Turbolet

The Orenburzhye fleet consists of the following aircraft:

Aircraft type	Active	Orders	Notes
Let L-410 Turbolet	7	—	
Antonov An-2	15	—	
Mil Mi-2	6	—	
Mil Mi-8	3	—	
Total	31	—	
