= Nazran (disambiguation) =

Nazran is a town in the Republic of Ingushetia, Russia.

Nazran may also refer to:

- Nazranians, an Ingush historical society, but also a demonym for the inhabitants of Nazran
- Nazran Airport, an airport in the Republic of Ingushetia, Russia
- Govinder Nazran (1964–2008), English artist
