= Red Dragon Bridge =

Bridge over the Irtysh river in Khanty-Mansiysk

Red Dragon Bridge Красный Дракон
- Coordinates: 60.989253°N 68.982672°E
- Carries: Road traffic
- Crosses: Irtysh
- Locale: Khanty-Mansiysk, Khanty-Mansi Autonomous Okrug, Russia

History
- Opened: September 2004

Location
- Interactive map of Red Dragon Bridge

The Bridge over the Irtysh (Russian: Мост через Иртыш), more commonly called the Red Dragon (Russian: Красный Дракон) is a bridge above the Irtysh river in Khanty-Mansiysk, opened in September 2024. it is located along the highway along Khanty-Mansiysk — Nyagan, which is part of the larger federal highway "Perm — Serov — Khanty-Mansiysk — Nefteyugansk — Surgut — Nizhnevartovsk — Tomsk," it's also known as the Northern Latitudinal Highway. Designed by JSC "Transmost," the contractor was JSC "Mostostroy-11," and the metal structures were manufactured by Kurganstalmost.
