= Igrim Airport =

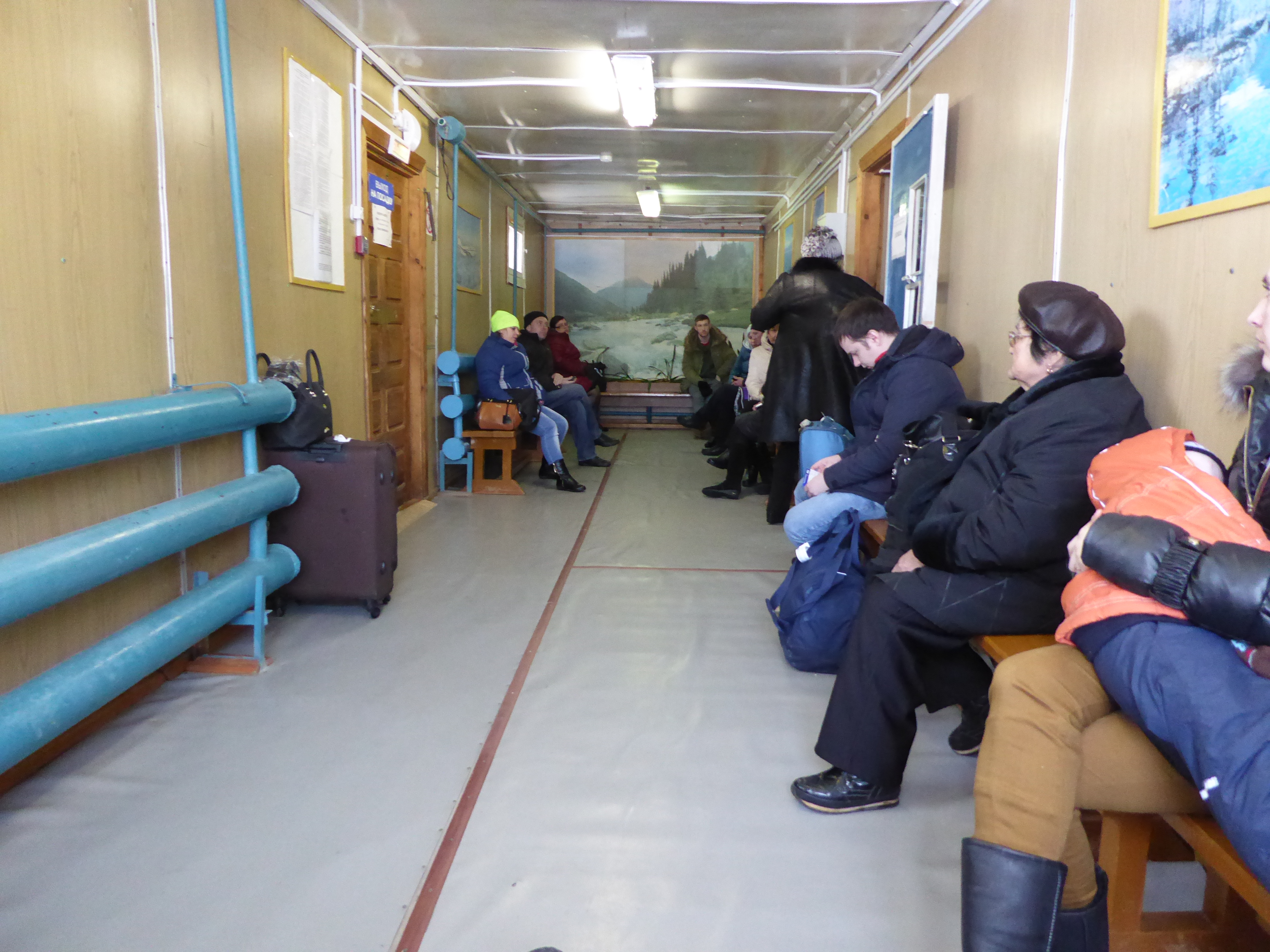
- IATA: IRM; ICAO: USHI; LID: ИРМ

Summary
- Location: Igrim, Khanty-Mansi Autonomous Okrug, Russia
- Coordinates: 63°11′55″N 64°26′21″E

Map
- Location of the airport

Igrim Airport (IATA: IRM, ICAO: USHI) is a regional airport in Igrim, Russia. The airport was built in 1964 after the discovery of natural gas fields in the vicinity of the village of Igrim. The airport services aircraft such as the AN-2, AN-24, AN-26, YAK-40 and L-410. The airport also has 4 helicopter pads. The runway is made of dirt and measures at 2030m long.

== Airlines and destinations ==
| Airlines | Destinations |
|---|---|
| Utair | Khanty-Mansiysk, Tyumen |

== See also ==
- List of airports in Russia
