= URJ =

URJ or urj may refer to:

- Union for Reform Judaism, the congregational arm of Reform Judaism in North America
- URJ, the IATA code for Uray Airport, Russia
- urj, the ISO 639-3 code for Uralic languages
