= Sovetsky Airport =

Airport in Khanty–Mansi Autonomous Okrug, Russia

Sovetsky Tyumenskaya Airport Аэропорт Советский
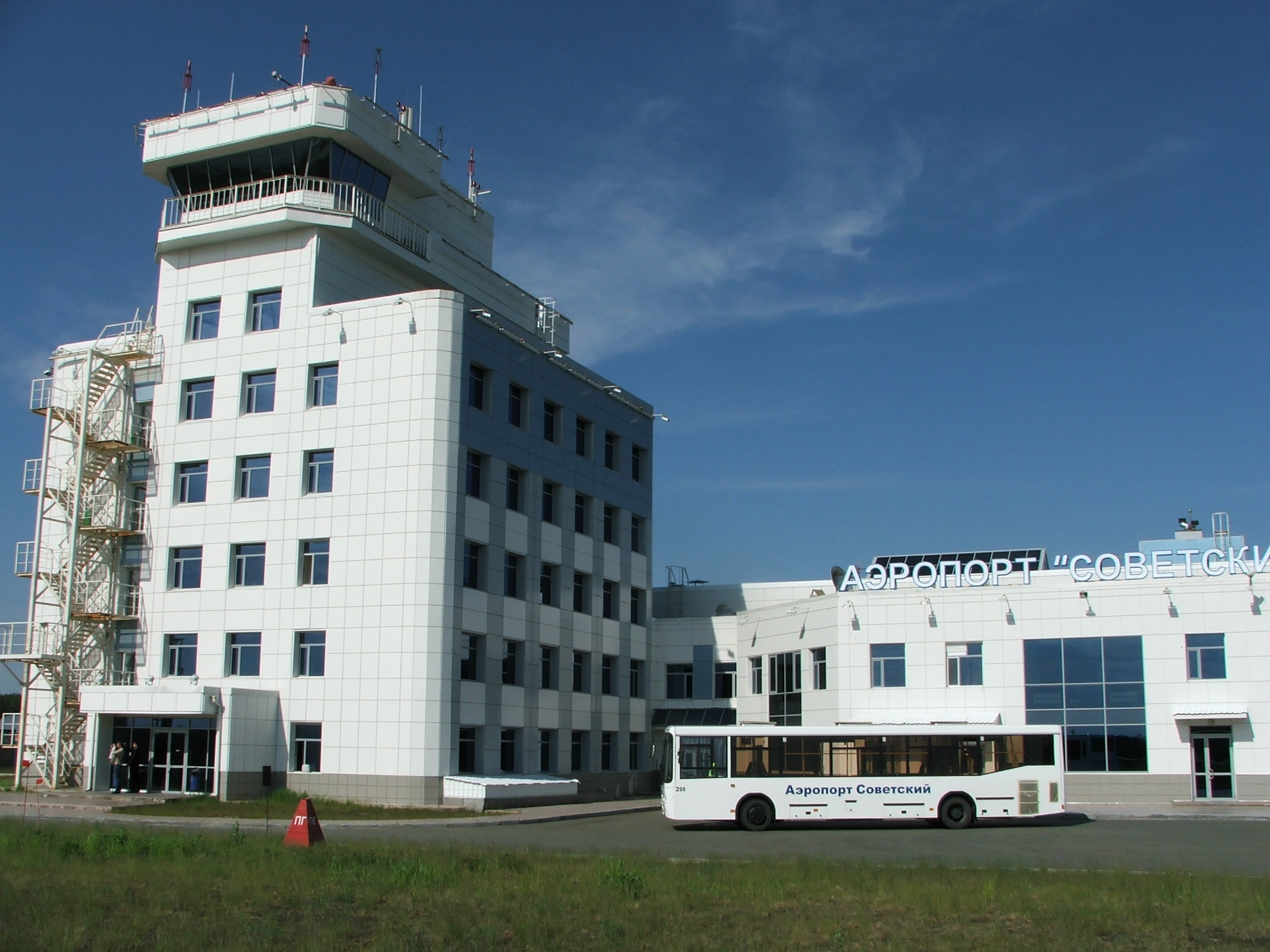
- The tower

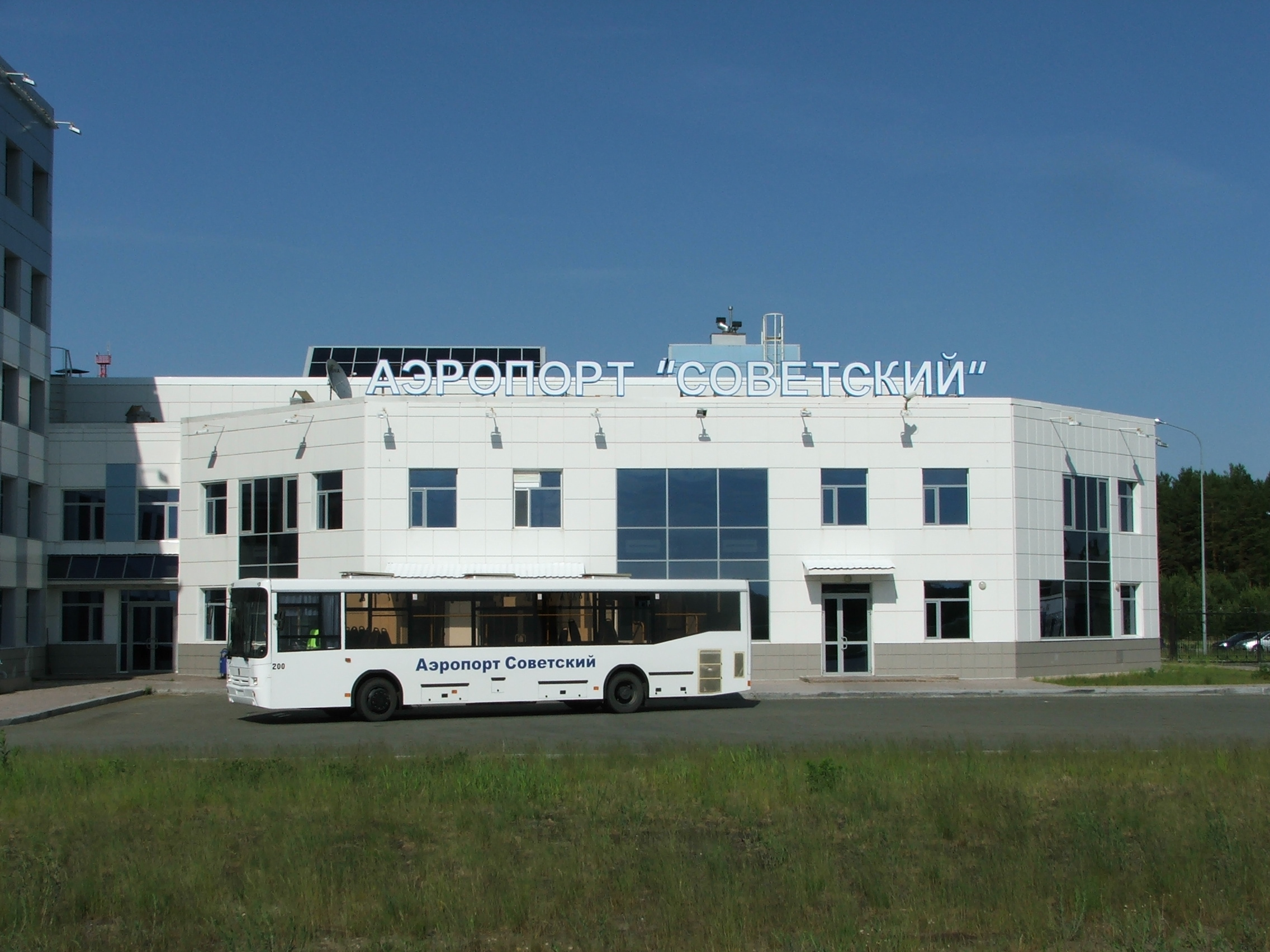
- The terminal
- IATA: OVS; ICAO: USHS

Summary
- Airport type: Public
- Location: Sovetsky, Khanty–Mansi Autonomous Okrug
- Elevation AMSL: 107 m / 351 ft
- Coordinates: 61°19′30″N 63°36′18″E
- Website: www.sovaero.ru

Map

Runways
Direction	Length		Surface
Direction	m	ft	Surface
12/30	2,500	8,202	Concrete

Sovetsky Tyumenskaya Airport (Russian: Аэропорт Советский) (IATA: OVS, ICAO: USHS) is an airport in Russia located 4 km south of Sovetsky, Khanty–Mansi Autonomous Okrug. It has a 2,500-meter long runway capable of accommodating turboprop, light to long-haul private jets, and regional aircraft.

== Airlines and destinations ==
Airlines	Destinations
Gazpromavia	Anapa, Beloyarsky, Moscow–Vnukovo, Nadym, Sochi, Yekaterinburg
Orenburzhye	Khanty-Mansiysk, Yekaterinburg
Severstal Air Company	Saint Petersburg
Utair	Beloyarsky, Tyumen
Yamal Airlines	Moscow–Domodedovo, Yekaterinburg

== See also ==
- List of airports in Russia
