= Shulgin =

Shulgin (Russian: Шульгин) is a Russian masculine surname, its feminine counterpart is Shulgina. It may refer to

- Alexander Shulgin (1925–2014), American pharmacologist and drug developer
  - Shulgin Rating Scale
- Alexander Shulgin (musician) (born 1964), Russian author and composer
- Alexei Shulgin (born 1963), Russian artist
- Ann Shulgin (1931–2022), American author and wife of Alexander Shulgin
- Anna Shulgina (born 1993), Russian film and stage actress, singer and TV presenter
- Arina Shulgina (born 1991), Russian triathlete
- Maxim Shulgin (born 1983), Russian volleyball player
- Sergei Shulgin (footballer) (born 1963), Russian football player
- Vasily Shulgin (1878–1976), Imperial Russian politician
