= Anapa International Airport =

Airport in Russia

Anapa International Airport Международный аэропорт Анапа

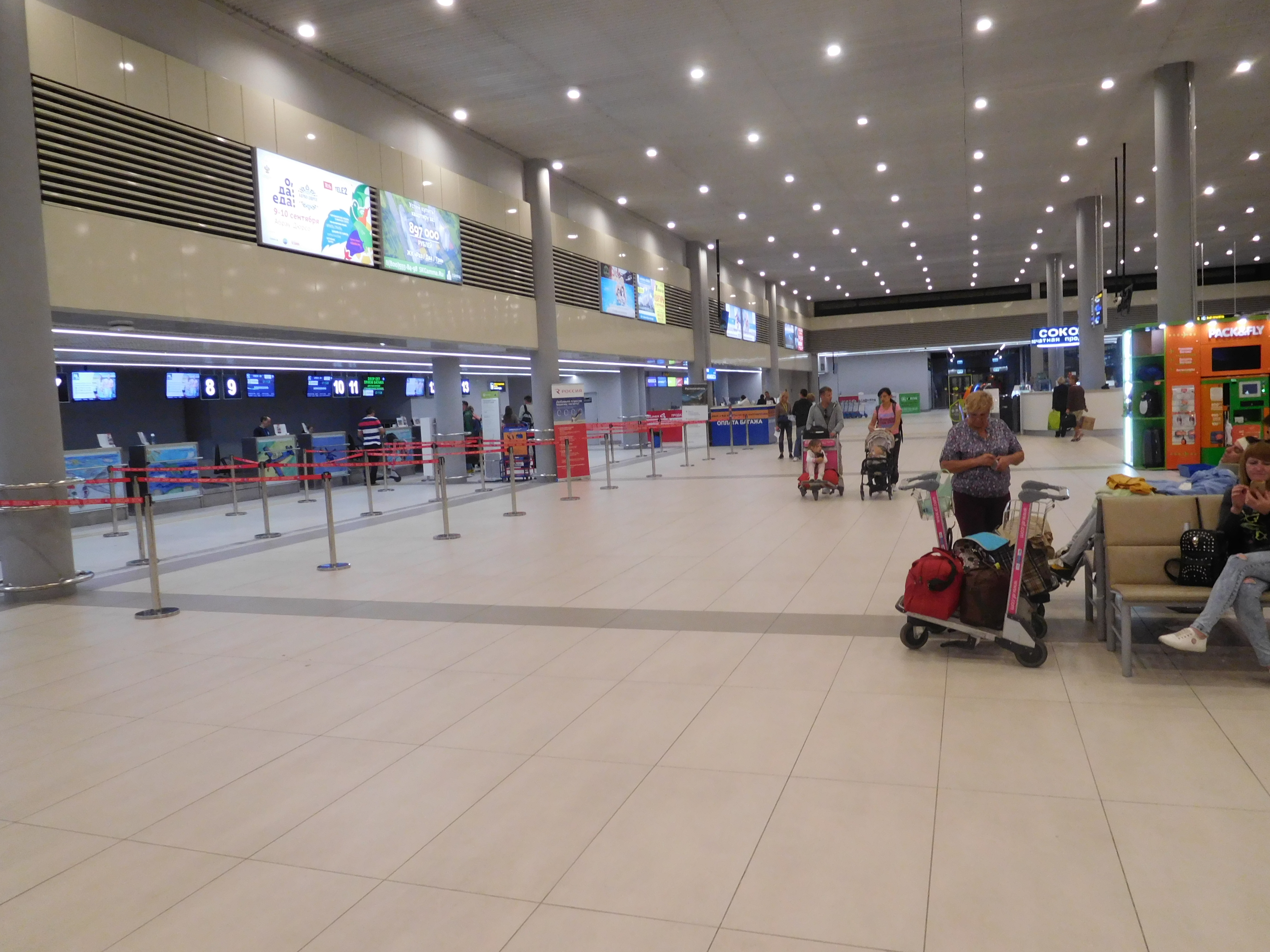
- IATA: AAQ; ICAO: URKA

Summary
- Airport type: Public
- Operator: JSC "Anapa Airport"
- Serves: Anapa
- Location: Anapa, Russia
- Passenger services ceased: February 24, 2022
- Hub for: Pobeda; Yamal Airlines
- Elevation AMSL: 174 ft (53 m)
- Coordinates: 45°00′07.5″N 37°20′50.3″E
- Website: aaq.aero/en

Map
- Location of airport in Krasnodar Krai Location of the airport in Russia Location of the airport in Europe

Runways
Direction	Length		Surface
Direction	ft	m	Surface
04/22	8,202	2,500	Concrete

Statistics (2018)
- Passengers: 1,487,382
- Sources: Russian Federal Air Transport Agency (see also provisional 2018 statistics)

Anapa International Airport (Russian: Международный аэропорт Анапа) (IATA: AAQ, ICAO: URKA), also known as Vityazevo Airport (Russian: аэропорт Витязево) is an international airport located near Vityazevo village in Anapa, Russia. It serves the resort town of Anapa, as well as Novorossiysk and Temryuk, with a total population of over 400,000.

The airport is a part of Basel Aero, an airport management holding that also runs Sochi International Airport, Krasnodar, and Gelendzhik airports.

Passenger traffic at Anapa Airport in 2013 was 739,637. The airport is among the top 30 of Russia's busiest airports.

Construction of a new terminal began in March 2016 and was completed in July 2017, when the new terminal building became operational.

== History ==
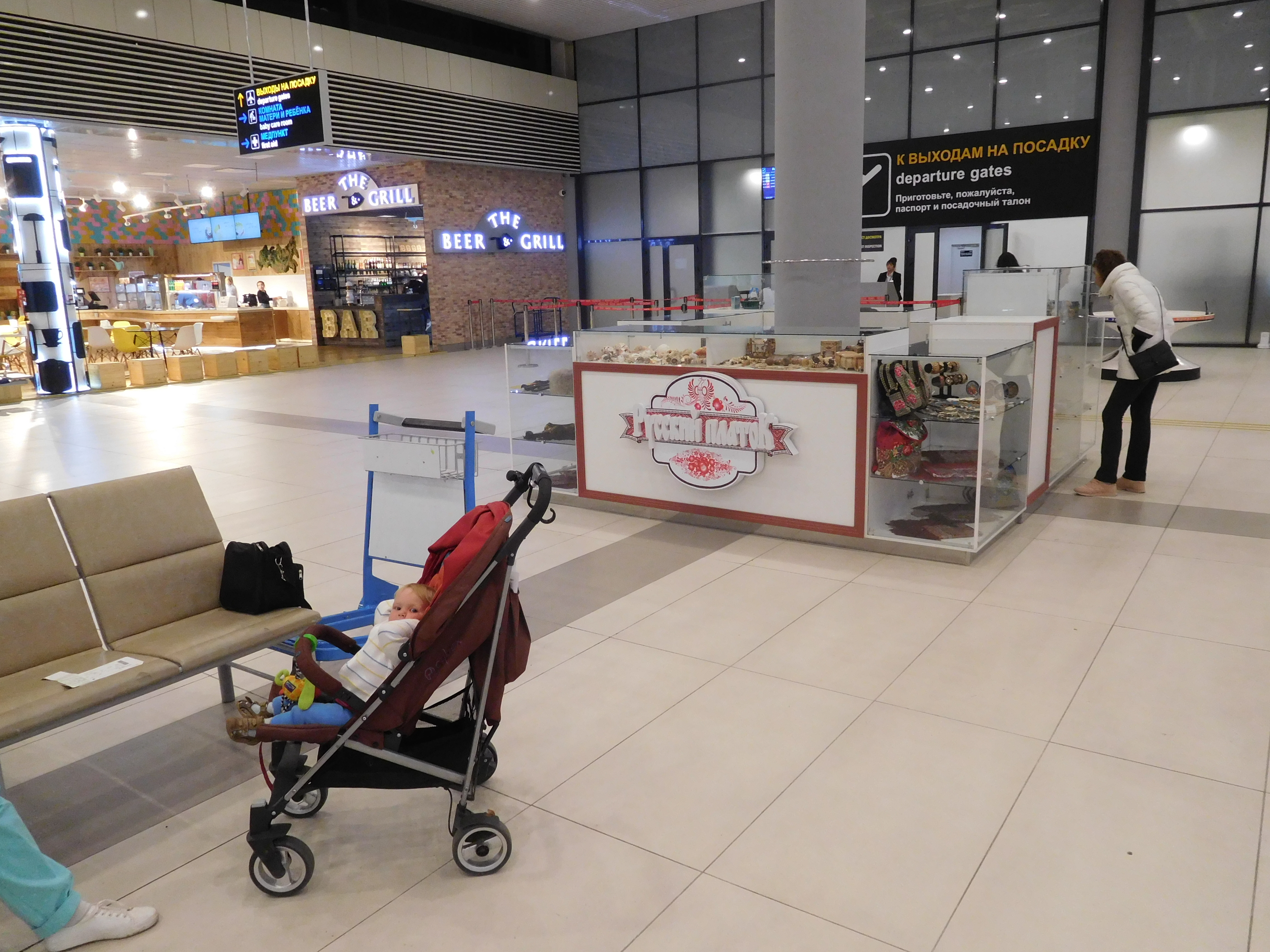
Departure gates at new terminal building

In 1934, scheduled passenger flights from Krasnodar to Anapa were launched.

In 1960, Anapa airport started accommodating An-2, Morava aircraft. Flights were performed to Krasnodar, Novorossiysk, and Gelendzhik. The airport had fewer than 10 staff, with only one radio station providing technical flight support.

In 1965, the building at Anapa airport was constructed (now it hosts a first-aid station). An aerodrome started accommodating An-24 aircraft. The airport has expanded its destination map and launched flight service to Moscow, Kerch, Donetsk, Kharkiv, Sukhumi. Due to the increased passenger traffic and aircraft landings, the airport was relocated to Anapa's suburb, near Vityazevo village, where it still operates. The new location allowed it to accommodate larger aircraft such as the An-10.

In 1969, construction of a new military airfield with a 2,500-m runway was launched near Vityazevo. It was kept secret for the facility's military purposes.

In 1970, Vityazevo Airport honored the 100,000th passenger.

In April 1974, an An-24 performed the first regular passenger flight to Vityazevo.

In May 1974, a group of NATO military attachés went to Anapa on board the first flight Moscow – Anapa – Moscow. They oversaw the construction of the military runway, one of the longest at the time in the Soviet Union. There were about 12 aerodromes in total, each with similar runways, across the country.

In 1976, Vityazevo Airport was officially opened. The new terminal could handle up to 70 daily flights originating from around 50 domestic airports.

In September 1976, a twin plane crash happened above Anapa when an An-24 and a Yak-40 crashed because of the aircraft dispatcher's fatal error. The tragedy claimed 70 lives.

In 1977, Tu-154s began flying to Vityazevo Airport, becoming the principal aircraft type in the fleets of Russian air carriers. A Тu-154 (USSR-85171) snapshot captured against the Anapa airport passenger terminal was reproduced on a Soviet postcard.

In 1982, an An-26 owned by the Black Sea Fleet Naval Air Force crashed near Anapa killing nine.

In 1988, Anapa airport was separated from the 1st Krasnodar United Air Group and became an independent entity: a separate class-III airport under the North Caucasian Civil Aviation Authority. Upon the installation of the SP-80M landing system, the aerodrome was issued an ICAO Category I certificate.

In 1991, the airport performed 6,828 takeoffs and landings, serving 439,600 passengers. During the summer season, the airport handled up to 52 flights operating at full capacity.

=== Post-Soviet history ===
In 1993, Vityazevo Airport was designated an international airport. Austrian Airlines became the first international airline to open a branch office in Anapa.

In 2001, Siberia's (S7 Airlines) launched operations at Vityazevo International Airport.

In 2005, SABRE, SITA, and Kupol passenger handling systems that enable passenger check-in to any destination in the world and the use of e-tickets were put into operation. In 2005, OJSC Anapa Airport won the "Russian National Olympus" award for its outstanding contribution to Russia's historical development in the "Outstanding small and medium businesses" category.

In 2006, the first scheduled flight of a Boeing (VP-BTD) of the S7 air carrier was performed.

In 2008, the first scheduled flight of an Airbus (VP-BHI) operated by the S7 air carrier was conducted. Later that year, the airport won the "Kuban Economic Leader 2007 – Territorial Contest Winner" award presented by the Krasnodar Territory Governor, A.N. Tkachev, in the "Aviation Transport" industry category. And in the same year, the airport won the "Kuban Transport Olympus" award, bestowed on businesses of the Kuban Transport Complex, "For rapid development momentum and flight safety".

In 2010, in accordance with the Federal Targeted Programs "Development of the Transportation System of Russia (2010-2015)" and "Modernization of the Transportation System of Russia (2002-2010)", the "Reconstruction of Anapa (Vityazevo) airport aerodrome" program was approved. The reconstruction was carried out in five stages from 2010 to 2012.

In 2011, S7 Boeing 737-400 (VP-BAN) flying from Domodedovo became the first scheduled flight after runway reconstruction. It carried 125 passengers.

In December 2011, Anapa International Airport first accommodated the Sukhoi Superjet 100 operated by Aeroflot.

In 2012, a new ramp at the airport was put into operation.

In January 2014, Anapa International Airport was fully privatized after the Russian Auction House had sold out 25.5% of the government's stake to Sistema LLC for 153.6 million rubles ($4.4 million).

In April 2014, a specialty emergency services facility was opened at the airport.

In June 2014, Anapa airport launched direct air service with Simferopol, the administrative center of the disputed Crimean peninsula Annexation of Crimea by the Russian Federation .

In June 2017, at Anapa Airport, the new terminal began its work. The new terminal was built so that in case of the weather, construction, or other reasons, Anapa will officially serve Sochi International Airport during FIFA-2018.

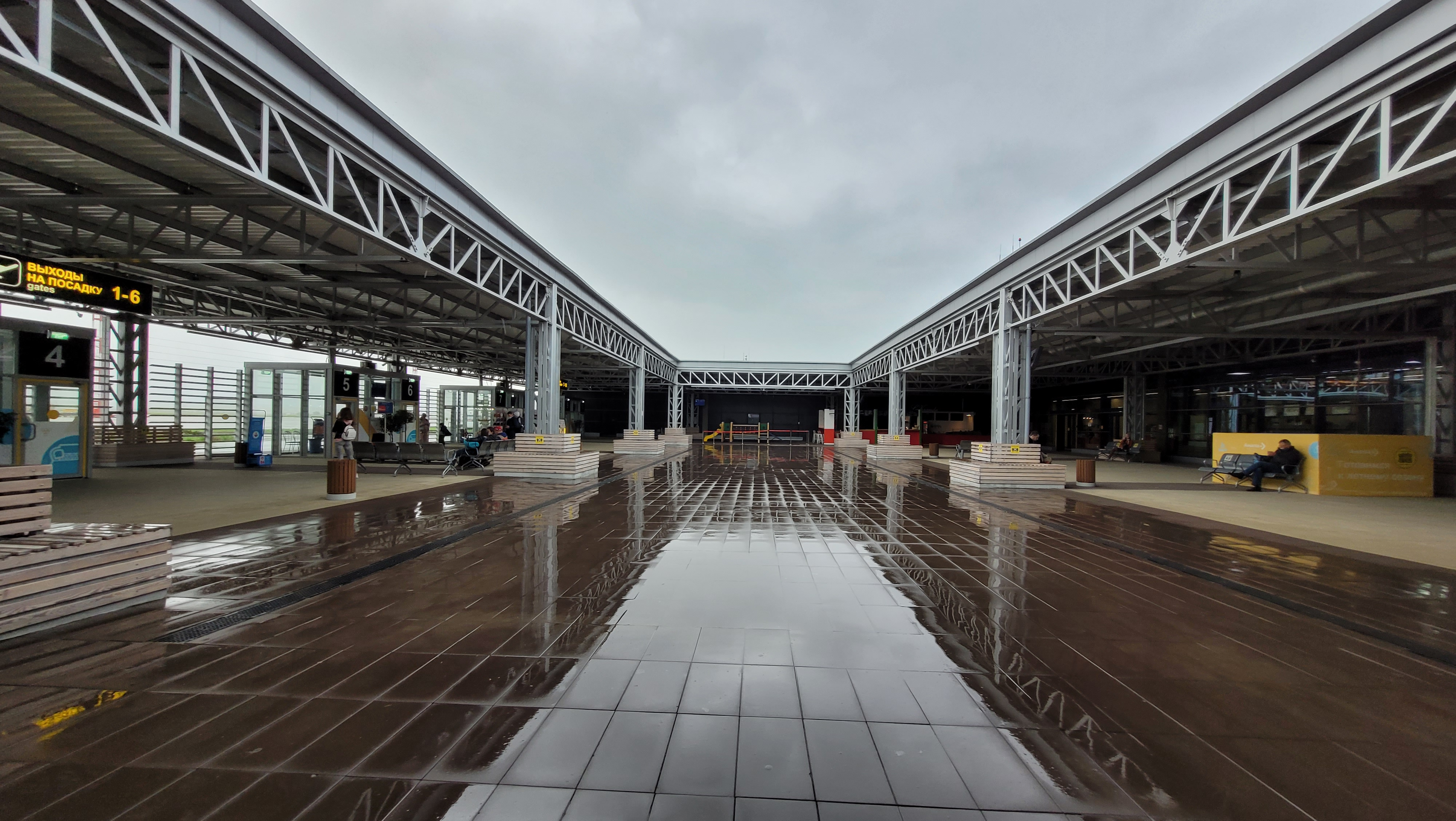
Open-air gates area in Anapa airport

Since the start of the Russian invasion of Ukraine on February 24, 2022, all civilian flights to and from the airport have been indefinitely suspended.

== Airlines and destinations ==
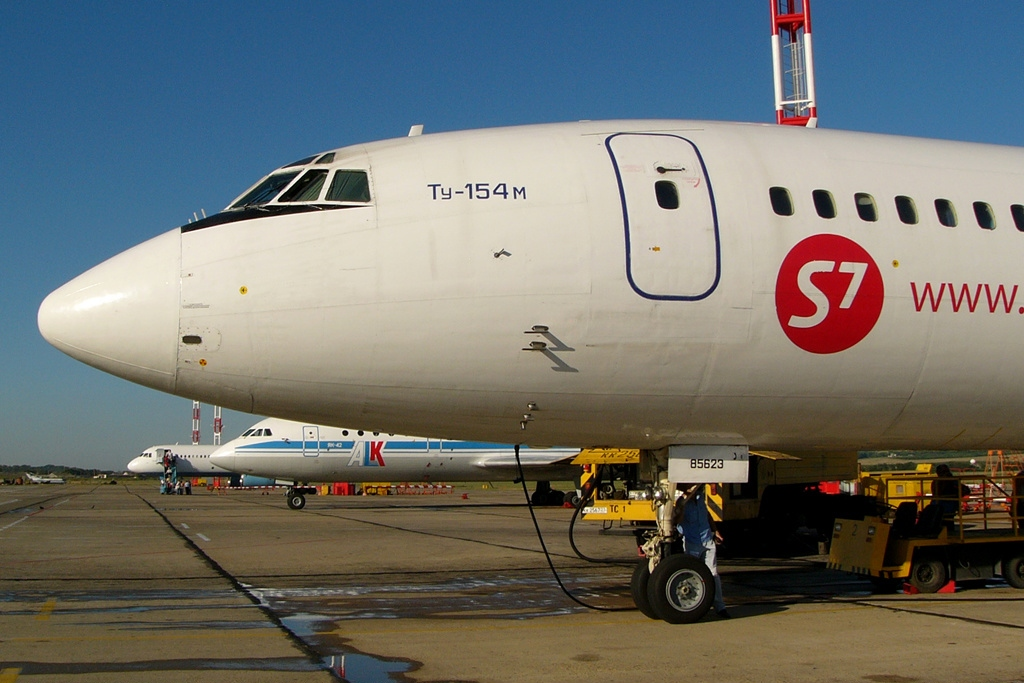
S7 Airlines Tupolev Tu-154M parked at Anapa Airport.

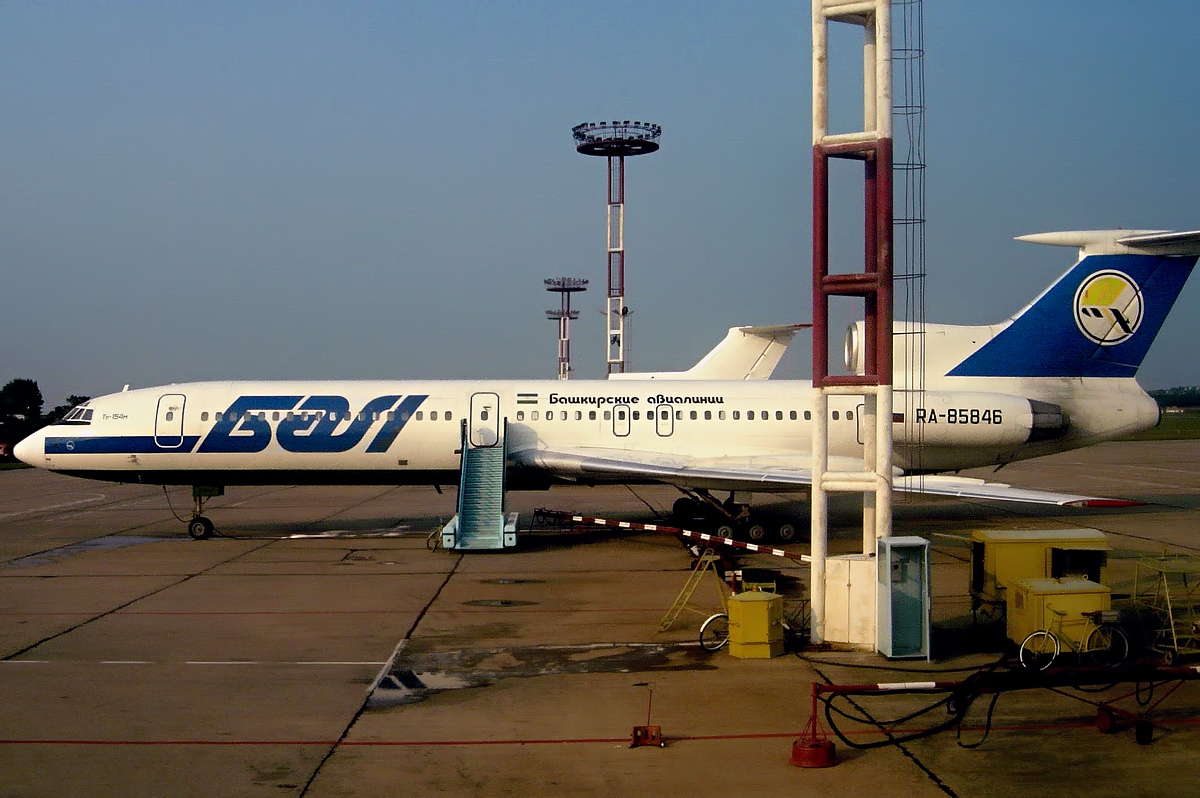
BAL Bashkirian Airlines Tupolev Tu-154M parked at Anapa Airport.

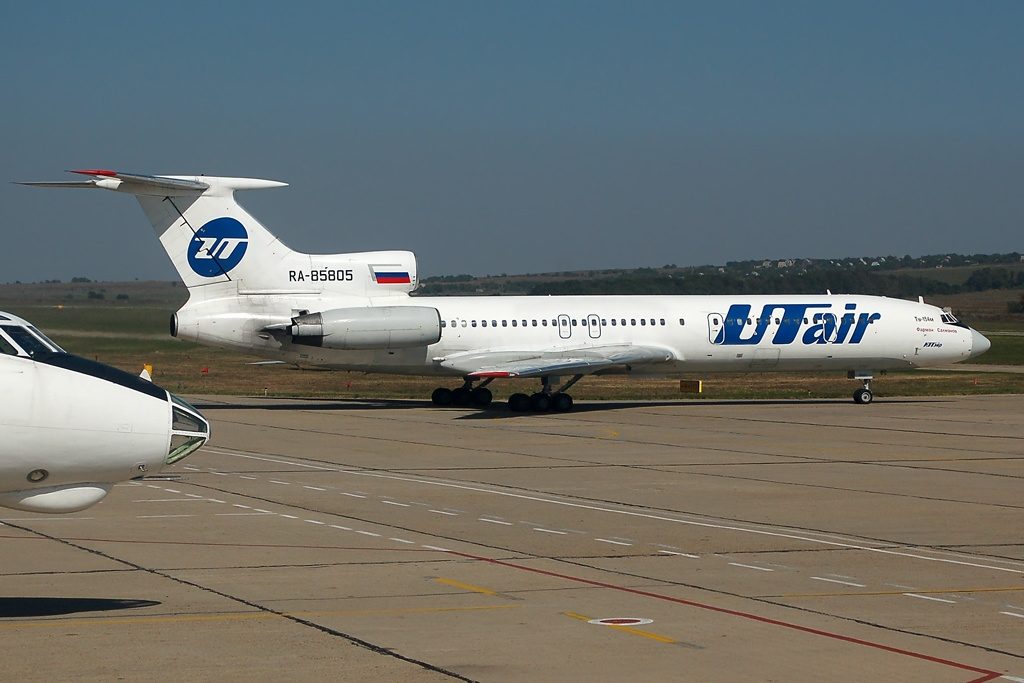
UTair Tupolev Tu-154M taxiing Anapa Airport.

Airlines	Destinations
Aeroflot	Moscow–Sheremetyevo
Armenia Airways	Yerevan
Gazpromavia	Sovetsky
IrAero	Moscow–Zhukovsky
Nordstar Airlines	Seasonal: Moscow–Domodedovo
Pobeda	Seasonal: Novosibirsk, Saint Petersburg
Rossiya Airlines	Seasonal: Saint Petersburg
RusLine	Seasonal: Voronezh
S7 Airlines	Moscow–Domodedovo, Novosibirsk; Seasonal: Ivanovo, Lipetsk
Severstal Air Company	Petrozavodsk
Smartavia	Seasonal: Nizhny Novgorod
Ural Airlines	Osh, Yekaterinburg; Seasonal: Cheboksary, Kaliningrad, Nizhny Novgorod
Utair	Sochi; Seasonal: Khanty-Mansiysk, Moscow–Vnukovo, Nizhnevartovsk, Surgut, Syktyvkar, Tyumen, Ufa

== See also ==
- List of the busiest airports in Russia
- List of the busiest airports in Europe
- List of the busiest airports in the former USSR
