= Irina Gaidamachuk =

Russian serial killer (born 1972)

- Born: Irina Viktorovna Gaidamachuk; May 22, 1972 (age 54); Nyagan, Khanty-Mansi Autonomous Okrug, Soviet Union
- Other names: Raskolnikov in a skirt Satan in a skirt She-wolf of Krasnoufimsk; Maniac-woman from Sverdlovsk
- Conviction: Murder (17 counts)
- Penalty: 20 years imprisonment

Details
- Victims: 17
- Span of crimes: 2002–2010
- Country: Russia
- Date apprehended: 2010

Irina Viktorovna Gaidamachuk (Russian: Ирина Викторовна Гайдамачук; born 22 May 1972) is a Russian serial killer who killed 17 elderly women in Sverdlovsk Oblast between 2002 and 2010.

== Early life ==
Gaidamachuk was born on 22 May 1972, in the town of Nyagan, Khanty–Mansi Autonomous Okrug, Soviet Union. At a young age, she became addicted to alcohol, and subsequently, her parents were deprived of parental authority. She moved to Krasnoufimsk, Sverdlovsk Oblast in the early 1990s, where she met her husband Yuri, with whom she later had two children. Gaidamachuk's alcoholism was so extreme that Yuri reportedly would refuse to provide her with money out of fear that she would spend the money on alcohol.

== Murders ==
In 2002, Gaidamachuk began to murder elderly women around Sverdlovsk Oblast. She would pretend to be a social worker to gain access to the homes of the women, where she would kill them with an axe or hammer, then rob the victim for whatever money she could find. Gaidamachuk would sometimes set fire to the victim's home, attempting to cover her tracks, and would occasionally try to make the fire look like an accident. Police had linked the deaths together, but the investigation was slow and lacked many leads. The majority of the crimes were committed in Gaidamachuk's home town of Krasnoufimsk, with some being committed in Yekaterinburg, Serov, Achit and Druzhinino.

== Arrest and conviction ==
In 2010, Gaidamachuk attempted to kill another elderly woman, who managed to escape. The victim reported to the police that she was attacked and the attacker was a female, which proved to be a vital clue, as the police had assumed the killer was male. Gaidamachuk killed her final victim, Alexandra Povaritsyna, whose neighbour had seen her leave around the time of the murder. After the police received the information from Povaritsyna's neighbour, they arrested Gaidamachuk who quickly confessed to the killings. Another woman had been initially suspected of the crimes and, after pressure from authorities, had already confessed to the murders. Gaidamachuk stated that she committed the murder-robberies to pay for vodka to feed her alcohol addiction, as her husband refused to give her money for it.

In February 2012, the court case began in Yekaterinburg. Gaidamachuk gave a confession to the indictment during the preliminary investigation but contested this throughout her trial. A forensic psychiatric examination conducted by GNTSSSP Serbsky showed that Gaidamachuk, although she showed some mental illness, was legally sane at the time of the murders.

In June 2012, Gaidamachuk was charged with 17 counts of murder and one count of attempted murder, and was sentenced to 20 years in prison, the maximum possible sentence for women according to Russian law. Relatives of the victims were outraged at the short length of the sentence, citing that Gaidamachuk received only just over a year per killing, adding that she should never be freed.

== See also ==
- List of Russian serial killers
- List of serial killers by number of victims
