= Sulom-Bek Oskanov =

Pilot

- Суламбек Сусаркулович Осканов
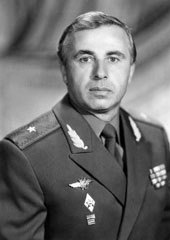
- Born: 8 January 1943; Plievo village, Nazran district, Chechen-Ingush ASSR, USSR
- Died: 7 February 1992 (aged 48) near Khvorostyanka village, Dobrinsky District, Russia
- Military career
- Allegiance: Soviet Union; Russian Federation
- Branch: Air Force
- Service years: 1961 – 1992
- Rank: Major-General
- Awards: Hero of Russia; Order of the Red Star

Sulom-Bek Susarkulovich Oskanov (Russian: Суламбек Сусаркулович Осканов; 8 January 1943 – 7 February 1992) was an Ingush pilot and Major-General in the Soviet and later Russian Air Forces who headed the Lipetsk Center of Combat Training. After his death in a plane crash in which he chose not to eject from the plane which would save himself in order to prevent casualties on the ground, he was posthumously awarded the title Hero of the Russian Federation; he was the second person awarded the title after cosmonaut Sergei Krikalev and the first posthumous recipient of the award.

== Early life ==
Oskanov was born in 1943 in Plievo, Chechen-Ingush ASSR into a peasant family. In February 1944, together with whole Ingush and Chechen nations, he and his family deported to prison camps in Central Asia during Operation Lentil. Soon after being permitted to return to the Caucasus he returned to the newly restored Chechen-Ingush ASSR. He then entered a vocational school and studied at an aeroclub in Grozny.

== Aviation career ==
Oskanov entered the Soviet military in 1961. In 1966 he graduated with honors from the Kacha Higher Military Aviation School of Pilots and was assigned to work as a flight instructor with the rank of Lieutenant. Three years later he was made the deputy commander of a flight training squadron. He then served in Germany and before being appointed as deputy commander of a center of military education in Lipetsk in 1987 while he was a colonel. On 6 May 1989 he was promoted to the rank of Major-General of Aviation, and later that year he became the commander of the training center. In 1990 he defended his thesis and became a Candidate of Military Sciences. The next year, he graduated from the Military Academy of the General Staff.

Oskanov had met with Dzhokhar Dudayev and was friends with Ruslan Aushev.

=== Last flight ===
On 7 February 1992, a MiG-29 Oskanov was flying in difficult weather suffered an in-flight electronics failure, resulting in the artificial horizon going blank. He chose not to eject from the fighter and save himself to so he could prevent the fighter from crashing into a populated area. He was posthumously awarded the title Hero of the Russian Federation.

== Honors and commemorations ==
- Posthumously awarded the title Hero of the Russian Federation.
- A MiG-29S of the Russian Air Force and a Boeing 767 of Utair was named in his honor.
- The Magas Airport in Ingushetia is named after him.
- A 2017 postage stamp of Russia featured his portrait.

== See also ==
- List of Heroes of the Russian Federation
