= Koltsovo International Airport =

International airport at Yekaterinburg, Russia

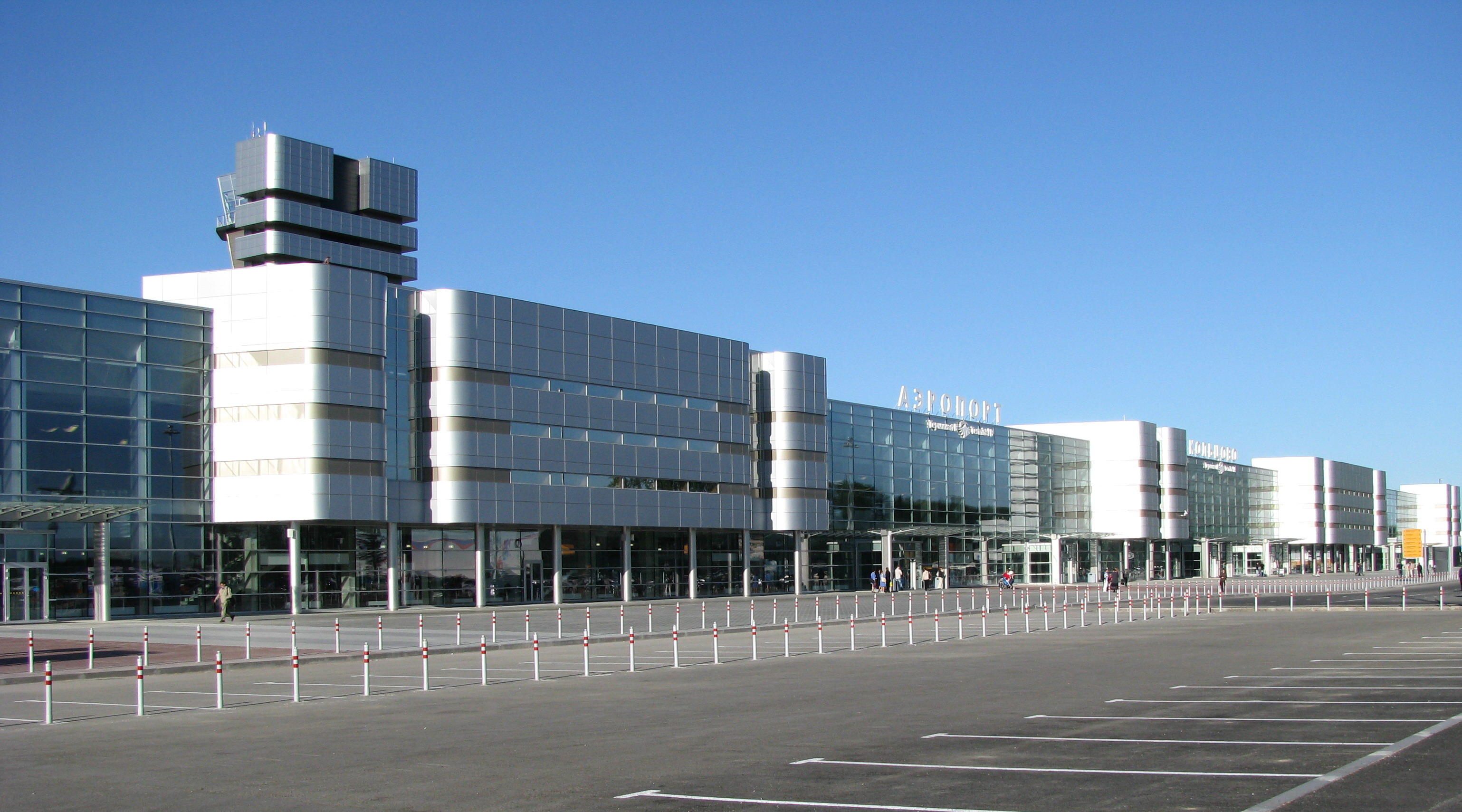
- IATA: SVX; ICAO: USSS

Summary
- Airport type: Public
- Owner: JSC Koltsovo Invest
- Operator: HC Airports of Regions
- Serves: Yekaterinburg
- Location: Yekaterinburg, Sverdlovsk Oblast, Russia
- Hub for: Red Wings Airlines; Ural Airlines
- Focus city for: Pobeda; RusLine
- Elevation AMSL: 233 m (764 ft)
- Coordinates: 56°44′29″N 60°48′13″E
- Website: ar-svx.ru

Map
- Location of the airport in Sverdlovskaya Oblast Location of the airport in Russia Location of the airport in Europe

Runways
Direction	Length		Surface
Direction	m	ft	Surface
08R/26L	3,026	9,928	Cement-concrete
08L/26R	3,004	9,856	Asphalt-concrete

Statistics (2018)
- Passengers: 5,953,840
- Sources: Russian Federal Air Transport Agency (see also provisional 2018 statistics)

Koltsovo International Airport (Russian: Аэропорт Кольцово) (IATA: SVX, ICAO: USSS) is the international airport serving Yekaterinburg, Russia, located 16 km (10 mi) southeast of the city. Being the largest airport in Sverdlovsk Oblast, Koltsovo also serves nearby towns such as Aramil, Sysert, and Polevskoy. In general, the airport is responsible for serving approximately 4,290,000 people yearly. As of 2024 it is the 7th busiest airport in Russia as well as the 10th busiest in the Post-Soviet states. The airport is a hub for Ural Airlines, RusLine and Aviacon Zitotrans. Due to its location in the center of Russia, Yekaterinburg's airport is included in the "Priority Airports" list of Russia's Federal Air Transport Agency (Rosaviatsia).

== Description ==
Koltsovo was first used as a civil airport on July 10, 1943.

In 2014, Koltsovo Airport had a passenger traffic of 4,526,167, a +5.4% increase from that of 2013. Domestic passenger traffic of 2014 made up for 2,407,429 (+11.3%) passengers; international passenger traffic consisted of 2,118,738 (-0.5%) passengers. In 2014 Koltsovo operated 25,531 tonnes of cargo, a -8.1% decrease from that of last year. Koltsovo operated 3,600 tonnes of mail, a 250% increase from that of 2013. In 2013, it handled 4,293,002 passengers and 27,800 tonnes of cargo, representing a +13.5% increase compared to the previous year.

Koltsova is managed by Airports of Regions Holding, who also manage Kurumoch International Airport (Samara), Strigino International Airport (Nizhny Novgorod), Platov International Airport (Rostov-On-Don) and Gagarin International Airport (Saratov), with two new airports planned: Petropavlovsk-Kamchatsky and Novy Urengoy. It is a joint public-private enterprise with private investments exceeding 70 billion rubles.

Koltsovo is a member of Airports Council International (ACI) and is in the top 7 busiest airports in Russia.

The base is home to the 32nd Independent Composite Transport Aviation Regiment as part of the 14th Air and Air Defence Forces Army.

== History ==
=== 1928–1945 ===
Koltsovo's original aerodrome was constructed between 1928 and 1930 at the behest of the Air Force Institute of the USSR. It was primarily built as a military aerodrome. In 1932, the 33rd air division, formerly belonging to the Privolzhsky Military District, was transferred to the Koltsovo aerodrome; the division was later redirected to the border with Finland during the Winter War. After Nazi Germany declared war on the USSR, entangling the Soviet Union into World War II, construction of a 1 km runway was announced. Construction began the next day and the runway was completed in three months, a record breaking time for the 1940s.

On 15 May 1942, USSR's first jet engine plane, the BI-1, completed its maiden flight from Koltsovo airport. The new aircraft was manually operated by Grigory Bakhchivadzhi. Six experimental flights were conducted on the BI-1, until, on the 7th flight, during maximum speed testing, the pilot lost control of the trajectory of the plane and crashed, resulting in Bakhchivadzhi's death. A 1:1 scale replica of the BI-1 jet plane was recreated in the front square of the airport in honour of the BI-1 and Grigory. The monument still stands.

On 10 July 1943, the airport gained domestic status. This made Koltsovo the first airport in the USSR to have civil and military status at once. Flights from Yekaterinburg to Moscow were conducted on a daily basis. In December 1943, on the way back from Tehran, U.S. President Franklin D. Roosevelt stayed overnight at the Koltsovo airport. During World War II the airport acted as a joint in the classified route between Fairbanks, Alaska and Moscow, Russia, in which C-47 aircraft were imported into the USSR. By January 1944, Koltsovo owned four aircraft, granted by the USSR Ministry of Civil Aviation for the purpose of domestic flights: two LI-2 and two Junkers. After the surrender of Nazi Germany, Koltsovo was used as joint for the relocation of military aircraft to the Pacific Front for the combating of the Japanese Empire. Between 1943 and 1945, despite the extremely high traffic rates for an airport of such size, no airplane crashes were recorded.

=== 1945–1991 ===
In 1951, the airfield underwent a reconstruction. In the early 1950s, flights from Moscow to Beijing, China, made a layover in Koltsovo. The route from Koltsovo to Beijing was also the airport's first international flight. In 1954, a new terminal completed construction. The Russian Imperial-Modern style and the large spire made this terminal a prominent symbol of Yekaterinburg and all of Sverdlovsk. In 1956 all runways were extended and reinforced with concrete flooring. This allowed for larger aircraft such as the Tu-104 and IL-18 to dock at Koltsovo. In 1958, a hotel with 100 rooms was built 800m from the terminal. The hotel went bankrupt in 1961 and was the demolished the preceding year.

In 1963, a new 3-star "Liner" hotel with 235 rooms completed construction. On 1 January 1967, a new terminal complex was exploited for domestic flights. This terminal was twice as large as the original terminal and had a passenger traffic limit of 1,500,000 passengers and could support 700 pax/hour. The terminal was placed to the right of the original terminal; today, the new Terminal A and B stand where the 1967 terminal stood.

In 1983, an arrival terminal was built. On 6 March 1987, a second runway completed construction and was exploited. In 1991, due to the dissolution of the USSR, the Sverdlovsk united air group of the Ural Civil Airports Office was reformed to the First Sverdlovsk Airline. In October 1993, Koltsovo was granted international status. On 28 December 1993, as a result of the division and privatization of the First Sverdlovsk Air, two joint-stock companies were set up: OJSC (now JSC) "Airport Koltsovo" and JSC "Ural Airlines". Later JSC Koltsovo Airport was renamed to JSC "Koltsovo Invest", Koltsovo's current owner company.

=== 2003–present ===
In 2003, an implement of the airport development as a hub Program was started with the support of Russian Federation Ministry of Transport, Sverdlovsk Oblast Government and the Renova Group. Investment into the Koltsovo large scale reconstruction of 2003–2009 years estimated about 12,000,000,000 rubles: private investments totaled 8,000,000,000 rubles (to the air-terminal complex development and technical re-equipment of services), state investments totaled 4,000,000,000 rubles (to rebuild aerodrome pavement and control tower building). In 2005, a new international terminal for Yekaterinburg finished construction and was exploited for proper use. The same year Yekaterinburg established new borders of the city, resulting in Koltsovo village, where the airport was located, in becoming part of Yekaterinburg's municipal district. A new catering facility was also implemented in 2005, as well as the international terminal.

In 2006, the original Koltsovo terminal was converted to a business terminal and underwent a complete renovation. The preceding year, the domestic terminal adjacent to the international terminal completed construction. In 2008, an aeroexpress railway station from the center of Yekaterinburg to Koltsovo finished building. On 14 June 2009, Koltsovo received its first ever jumbo jet: the Air China Boeing 747 with the Chinese delegates. On 15 June 2009, the international terminal was expanded again and opened by the President of the Russian Federation Dmitry Medvedev in time for the BRICS (then known as BRIC) summit. Additionally in 2009, the 4-star Angelo hotel, new control tower, and a fixed runway were put into exploitation. This enabled the airport to handle all types of heavy aircraft, including the Airbus A380, Airbus A320, Boeing 737, Boeing 747, and Airbus A330 aircraft.

Beginning 24 May 2014, Koltsovo began cooperating with CIS Routes. On 24 July 2012, the airport opened a new cargo terminal with a total area of 19,185 m^{2}. The opening ceremony was attended by the governor of the Sverdlovsk Oblast Yevgeny Kuyvashev and Mayor of Yekaterinburg, Alexander Jacob. On 13 June 2013, a new business lounge for domestic passengers was opened.

== Infrastructure ==
=== Terminals ===
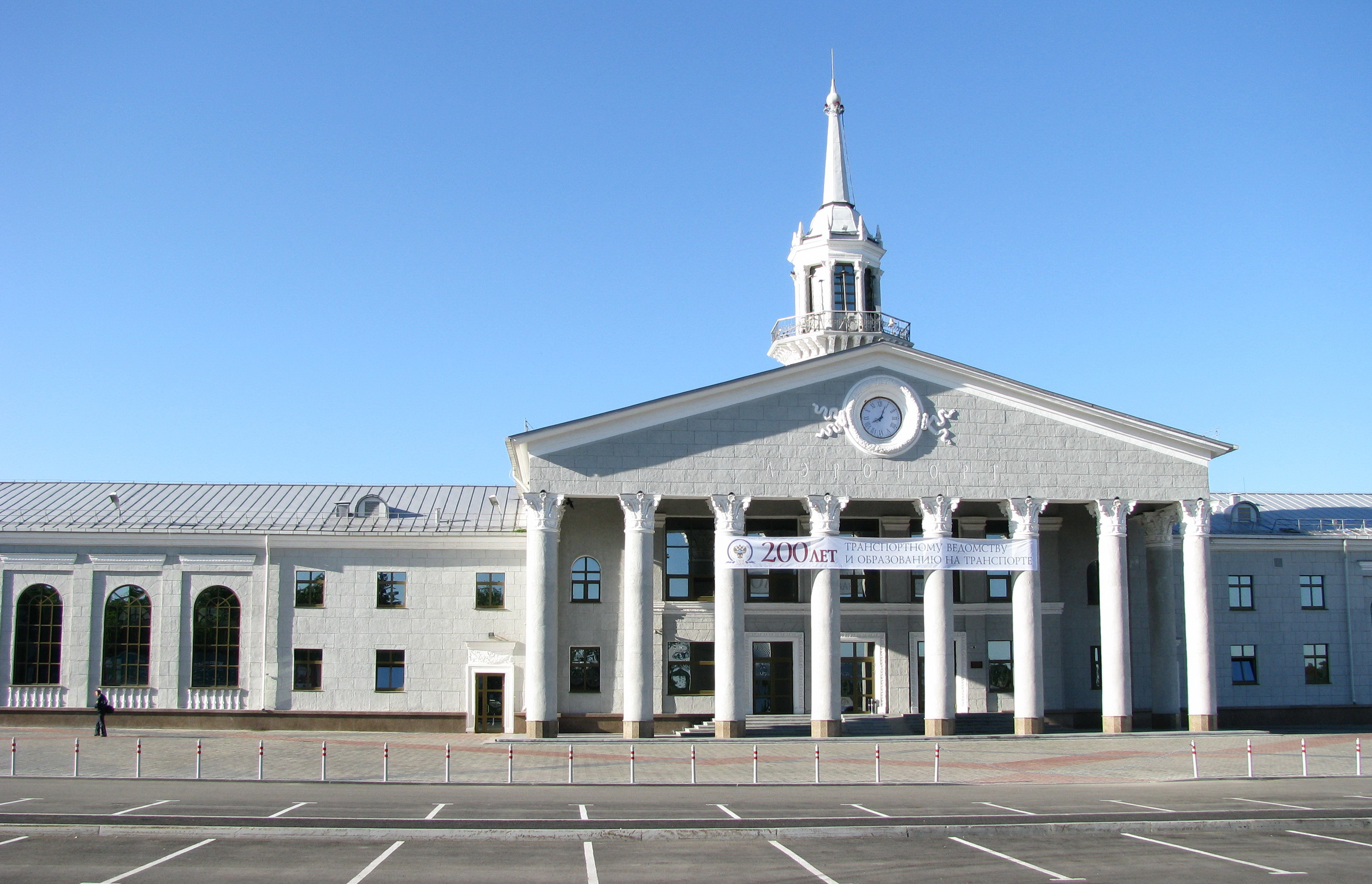
The VIP (business) terminal in Koltsovo

Terminal A completed construction in 2007. It is used solely as a departures and arrivals facility for domestic flights. The terminal was 19,600 m^{2} and had a capacity of 1,000 pax/hour. Later the 2005 International terminal was joined to Terminal A, making the total area of the terminal 35,000 m^{2} and the capacity of 1600 pax/hour. The terminal is 2 floors in height. The ground floor contains check-in desks, baggage claim areas (with carousels), currency exchange centers, a staff room, and several coffee shops. The second floor has several restaurants, including Grenki Pub, a children's nursery room, and the domestic business lounge which opened on 13 June 2013. The lounge is accessible by passengers with business class tickets or for a fee of 1960 rubles. The terminal has 5 jet bridges and several other bus gates. renovations to the domestic terminal were made as early as of 18 February 2014, with the stylistic and congestion reductional changes. The renovations began in 2012 with NefaResearch design studies winning the bid for the reconstruction, with Phase I completed on 27 December 2012, and Phase II on 18 February 2014. The total price of the renovations was listed at 141,000,000 rubles.

Terminal B original completed construction in 2005, with the total area of 15,400 m^{2} and the capacity of 600 pax/hour. On 15 June 2009, a larger, 45,000 m^{2} international terminal completed construction in time for the BRICS summit, and took the role of Terminal B. The original one was merged with the domestic terminal. Terminal B has a capacity of 1600 pax/hour. The terminal consists of 2 floors and is conjoined to Terminal A. The ground floor houses the check-in desks, a baggage claim area with the baggage carousels, customs control and several retail stores. On the second floor there stand the security control, international business lounge, a duty-free shop, a smoking room and several retail shops. General renovations were made alongside the domestic renovation project. The business terminal was renovated as recent as February 2014.

The business terminal, otherwise known as the VIP terminal, offers those willing to pay a unique experience. The business terminal is accessible only through direct payment. Prices can range from 8,500 rubles (one pass) to 250,000 rubles (12-month membership). The business terminal is located in Koltsovo's first terminal, built in 1954. The structure has a mix of empire style and Russian neoclassical revival styles, enhancing the royal feel. Inside, the VIP terminal is also styled in neoclassical revival. The business terminal offers separate check-in desks, passport and custom controls. Free WiFi, catering, and delivery to the airplane is also offered. The total area of the VIP terminal is 9,800 m^{2}.

=== Runways ===
The airport has two runways. Runway 1 is 3004х45 m; Runway 2 is 3026х53. Both runways pass the ICAO Category I standards. Both runways are also equipped with OVI-1 lighting facilities and are capable of handling aircraft of any size in any type of weather. Maintenance of the runways has been conducted as recently as of June 2012.

== Airlines and destinations ==
Airlines	Destinations
Aeroflot	Istanbul, Krasnodar, Moscow–Sheremetyevo, Novosibirsk, Sochi, Yerevan; Seasonal: Antalya, Goa–Mopa, Nha Trang, Phuket, Sanya
Air Arabia	Ras Al Khaimah, Sharjah (all flights suspended until 27 March 2027)
AlMasria Universal Airlines	Seasonal charter: Hurghada
Avia Traffic Company	Osh
Azerbaijan Airlines	Baku
Azur Air	Seasonal charter: Antalya, Dalaman, Hambantota–Mattala, Nha Trang
Belavia	Minsk
Centrum Air	Tashkent
Corendon Airlines	Seasonal charter: Antalya
flydubai	Dubai–International
FlyOne	Tashkent, Yerevan
Ikar	Seasonal charter: Nha Trang, Phuket
NordStar	Norilsk, Volgograd
Nordwind Airlines	Sochi; Seasonal: Makhachkala
Oman Air	Seasonal charter: Salalah
Pobeda	Dubai-Al Maktoum, Krasnodar, Moscow–Sheremetyevo, Moscow–Vnukovo, Saint Petersburg, Sochi; Seasonal: Antalya, Kaliningrad
Red Sea Airlines	Seasonal charter: Sharm El Sheikh
Red Wings Airlines	Abakan, Almaty, Aqtau, Astana, Astrakhan, Baku, Barnaul, Batumi, Bukhara, Elista (suspended until 31 August 2026), Gorno-Altaysk, Grozny, Izhevsk, Kazan, Kemerovo, Murmansk, Nizhnevartovsk, Nizhny Novgorod, Novokuznetsk, Novy Urengoy, Omsk, Orenburg, Samara, Saransk, Saratov, Stavropol, Surgut, Tbilisi, Tomsk, Ufa, Ulan-Ude, Ulyanovsk–Barartayevka, Ürümqi, Vladikavkaz; Seasonal: Kirovsk-Apatity (begins 25 December 2026); Seasonal charter: Nha Trang,
Rossiya Airlines	Krasnoyarsk–International, Mineralnye Vody, Saint Petersburg; Seasonal charter: Hurghada, Sharm El Sheikh
RusLine	Beloyarskiy, Kirov, Naryan-Mar, Nizhnevartovsk, Syktyvkar
S7 Airlines	Irkutsk, Novosibirsk
Severstal Avia	Cherepovets, Petrozavodsk
Smartavia	Saint Petersburg, Sochi
Somon Air	Dushanbe
Southwind Airlines	Seasonal charter: Antalya
Ural Airlines	Baku, Beijing–Daxing, Bishkek, Blagoveshchensk, Chita, Delhi (begins 27 October 2026), Dushanbe, Harbin, Irkutsk, Istanbul, Kaliningrad, Khabarovsk, Khujand, Krasnodar, Krasnoyarsk–International, Makahckala, Mineralnye Vody, Moscow–Domodedovo, Namangan, Osh, Saint Petersburg, Samarqand, Sochi, Tashkent, Vladivostok, Yerevan; Seasonal: Dubai–Al Maktoum, Gelendzhik; Seasonal charter: Doha
Utair	Khanty-Mansiysk, Nizhnevartovsk, Nyagan, Samara, Sovetsky, Surgut, Tyumen, Ufa, Uray
UVT Aero	Novosibirsk
Uzbekistan Airways	Namangan, Tashkent
VietJet Air	Seasonal charter: Nha Trang (begins 1 November 2026), Phu Quoc (begins 26 October 2026)
Yakutia Airlines	Saint Petersburg, Yakutsk
Yamal Airlines	Nadym, Novy Urengoy, Noyabrsk, Salekhard

== Statistics ==
=== Busiest routes ===
Busiest direct domestic^{*} routes at Koltsovo Airport by weekly flights
Rank	City	Airport(s)	Weekly departures (July 2018)	Airlines
1.	Moscow	Moscow Domodedovo Airport, Sheremetyevo International Airport, Vnukovo International Airport	157	Aeroflot, Alrosa, Nordwind Airlines, Pobeda, S7 Airlines, Ural Airlines
2.	Saint Petersburg	Pulkovo Airport	31	Aeroflot, Nordwind Airlines, Pobeda, Ural Airlines
3.	Novosibirsk	Tolmachevo Airport	25	S7 Airlines, Ural Airlines, Yakutia Airlines, Yamal Airlines
4.	Sochi	Adler-Sochi International Airport	23	Nordwind Airlines, Pobeda, Red Wings Airlines, Rossiya, Ural Airlines
5.	Simferopol^{*}	Simferopol International Airport	20	Nordwind Airlines, Rossiya, Ural Airlines
6.	Anapa	Vityazevo Airport	13	Pobeda, Rossiya, Ural Airlines
7.	Samara	Kurumoch International Airport	11	Utair, Yamal Airlines
8.	Tyumen	Roshchino Airport	11	Utair, Yamal Airlines
9.	Blagoveshchensk	Ignatyevo Airport	10	Ural Airlines
10.	Krasnodar	Pashkovsky Airport	7	Pobeda, Ural Airlines
11.	Surgut	Surgut International Airport	7	Utair
12.	Ufa	Mustai Karim Ufa International Airport	6	Utair

^*The political status of Crimea is the subject of a political and territorial dispute between Russia and Ukraine. The Crimean Peninsula was annexed by the Russian Federation in February–March 2014. In 2016, UN General Assembly reaffirmed non-recognition of the annexation and condemned "the temporary occupation of part of the territory of Ukraine—the Autonomous Republic of Crimea and the city of Sevastopol".

=== Traffic figures ===
Statistics for airport Koltsovo
Year	Total passengers	Passenger change	Domestic	International (total)	International (non-CIS)	CIS	Aircraft landings	Cargo (tonnes)
2000	930 251	+2% ▲	698 957	231 294	155 898	75 396	8 619	18 344
2001	1 028 295	+10,5% ▲	733 022	295 273	186 861	108 412	9 062	22 178
2002	1 182 815	+15,0% ▲	793 295	389 520	239 461	150 059	10 162	20 153
2003	1 335 757	+12,9% ▲	879 665	456 092	297 421	158 671	10 092	18 054
2004	1 553 628	+16,3% ▲	972 287	581 341	429 049	152 292	11 816	20 457
2005	1 566 792	+0,8% ▲	1 006 422	560 370	429 790	130 580	11 877	11 545
2006	1 764 948	+12,7% ▲	1 128 489	636 459	488 954	147 505	13 289	15 519
2007	2 345 097	+32,9% ▲	1 486 888	858 209	683 092	175 117	16 767	16 965
2008	2 529 395	+7,8% ▲	1 523 102	1 006 293	815 124	191 169	16 407	17 142
2009	2 169 136	−14,2% ▼	1 290 639	878 497	727 718	150 779	13 798	13 585
2010	2 748 919	+26,7% ▲	1 529 245	1 219 674	1 017 509	202 165	15 989	22 946
2011	3 355 883	+22,1% ▲	1 856 948	1 498 935	1 184 771	314 164	20 142	24 890
2012	3 783 069	+12.7% ▲	1 934 016	1 849 053	1 448 765	439 668	21 728	25 866
2013	4 293 002	+13.5% ▲	2 180 227	2 112 775			25 728	27 800
2014	4 526 167	+5.4% ▲	2 407 429	2 118 738			24 165	25 356
2015	4 247 541	−6.2% ▼	2 745 236	1 502 235			22 435	22 631
2016	4 300 732	+1.3% ▲	3 148 414	1 152 318			22 381	24 451
2017	5 403 885	+25.7% ▲	3 484 889	1 918 996			25 007	24 487
2018	6 103 049	+12.9% ▲	4 022 991	2 080 058				

=== Aircraft traffic ===
2000	2001	2002	2003	2004	2005	2006	2007	2008	2009	2010	2011	2012	2013
▲16,619	▲18,062	▲20,162	▼20,092	▲21,816	▲21,877	▲23,289	▲32,767	▲33,407	▼26,798	▲33,989	▲41,142	▲42,728	▲50,728

=== Cargo traffic (tonnes) ===
2000	2001	2002	2003	2004	2005	2006	2007	2008	2009	2010	2011	2012	2013	2014
▲18,344	▲22,178	▼20,153	▼18,054	▲20,457	▼11,545	▲15,519	▲16,965	▲17,142	▼13,585	▲22,946	▲24,890	▲25,866	▲27,800	▼25,531

== See also ==
- List of the busiest airports in Russia
- List of the busiest airports in Europe
- List of the busiest airports in the former USSR
- List of military airbases in Russia
