= Beloyarsk Airport =

Airport in Khanty-Mansi Autonomous Okrug, Russia

Beloyarsky Airport Аэропорт Белоярский
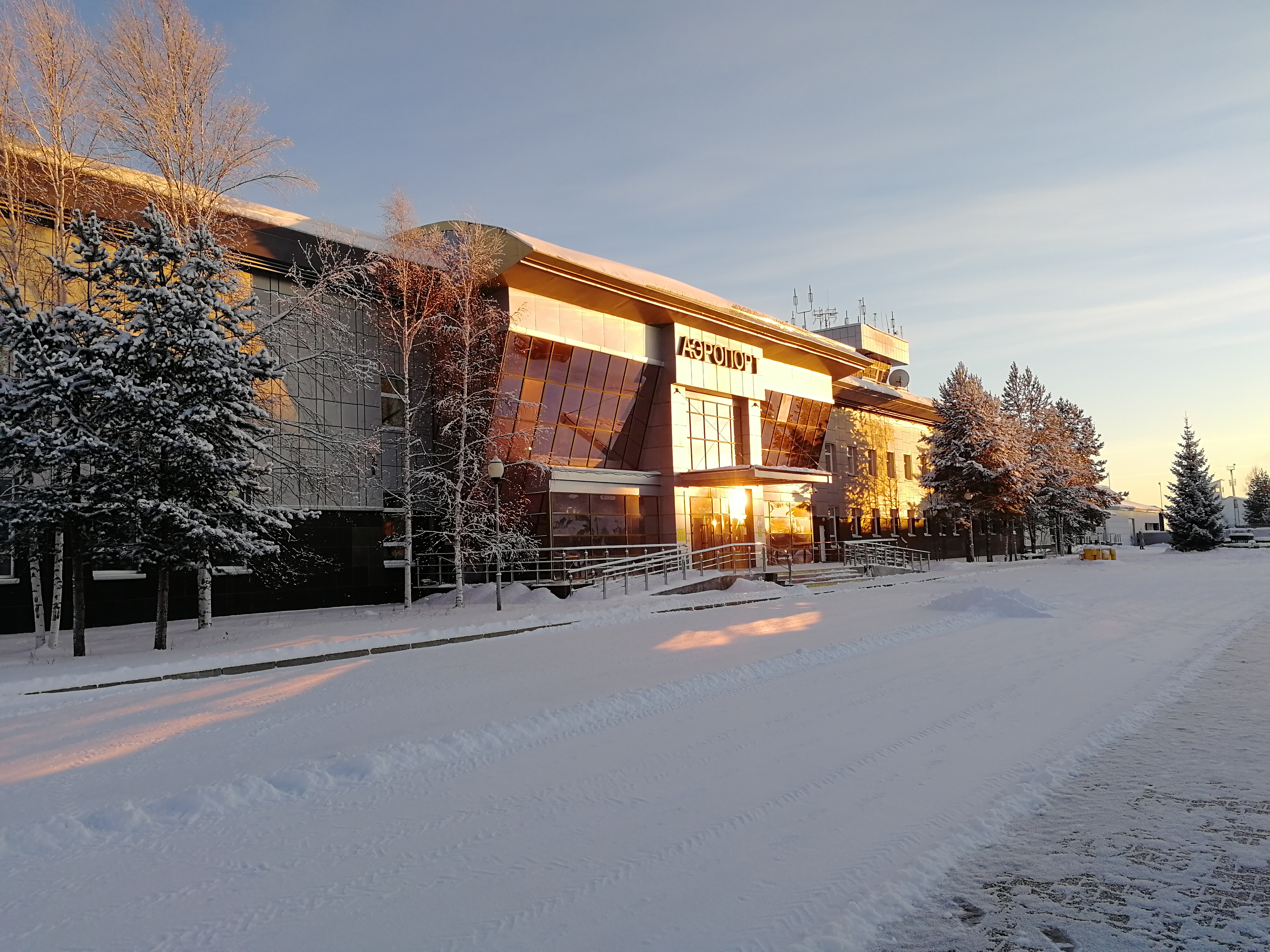
- IATA: EYK; ICAO: USHQ

Summary
- Airport type: Public
- Serves: Beloyarsky, Khanty-Mansi Autonomous Okrug
- Elevation AMSL: 79 ft / 24 m
- Coordinates: 63°40′59″N 66°40′59″E
- Website: www.airportblr.ru
- Interactive map of Beloyarsky Airport

Runways
| Direction | Length | | Surface |
| Direction | m | ft | Surface |
|---|---|---|---|
| 16/34 | 2,142 | 7,028 | Asphalt |

Statistics
- Time Zone: UTC +5

Beloyarsk Airport (IATA: EYK, ICAO: USHQ) is a public use airport in the Khanty-Mansi Autonomous Okrug in Russia.

== Airlines and destinations ==
| Airlines | Destinations |
|---|---|
| RusLine | Moscow-Zhukovsky, Yekaterinburg |
| Utair | Beryozovo, Khanty-Mansiysk, Nyagan, Sovetsky, Surgut, Tyumen |

== Accidents and incidents ==
- On 19 August 2022, an airport employee at Beloyarsk Airport died after being hit by the propeller of an Antonov An-24 aircraft of UTair Airlines.

== See also ==
- List of airports in Russia
