= Maxim Shulgin =

Russian volleyball player (born 1983)

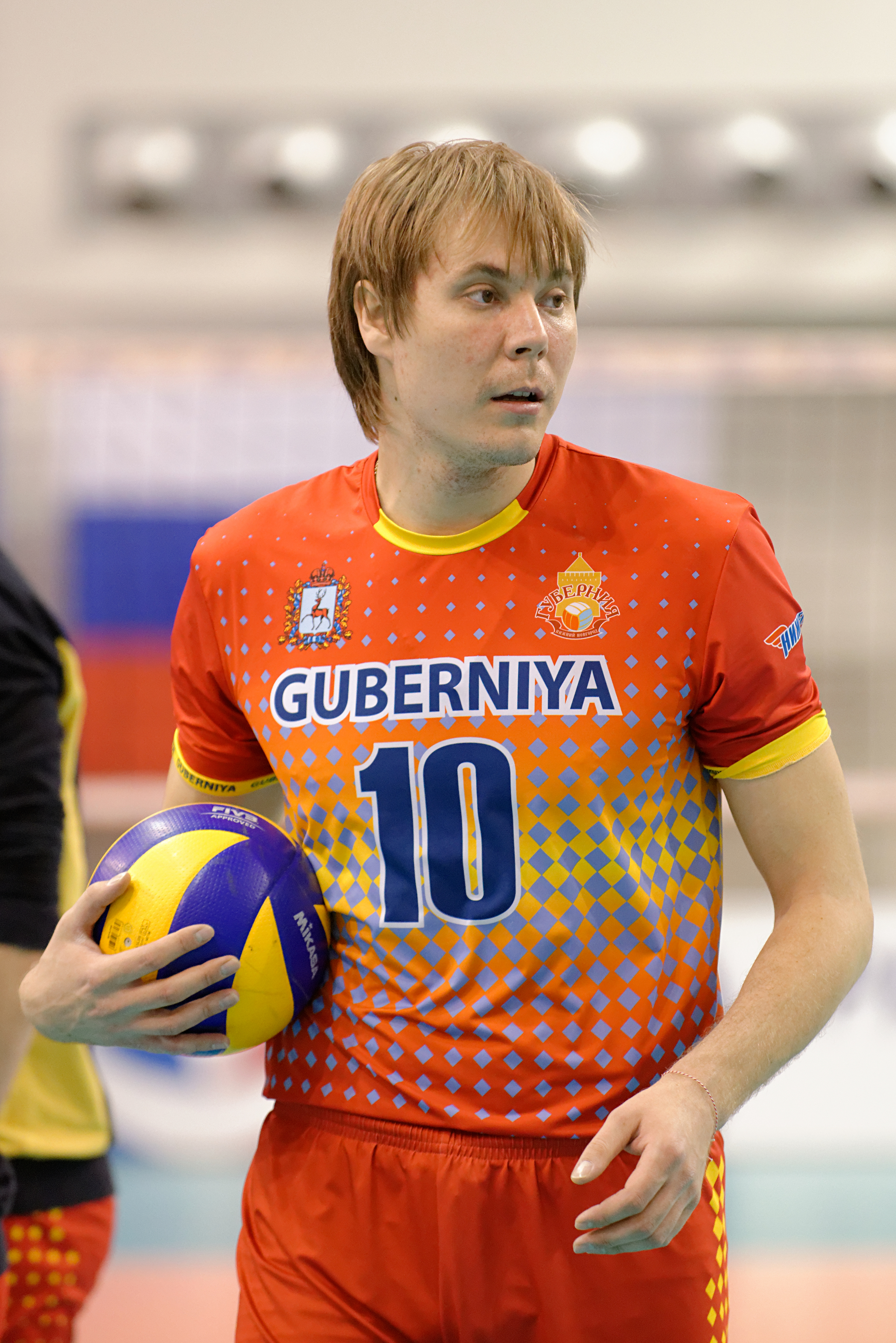

Personal information
- Full name: Maxim Petrovitch Shulgin
- Nationality: Russian
- Born: May 17, 1983 (age 43); Nyagan, Russia, USSR
- Height: 2.04 m (6 ft 8 in)
- Weight: 97 kg (214 lb)

Volleyball information
- Position: Setter
- Current club: Zenit Saint Petersburg

Career
Years	Teams
1999–2006; 2006–2007; 2007–2010; 2010–2011; 2011–2015; 2015–2016; 2016–2017; 2017–	Yugra Nizhnevartovsk; Belogorie Belgorod; NOVA Novokuybyshevsk; Dinamo Krasnodar; Guberniya Nizhniy Novgorod; Lokomotiv Novosibirsk; Ural Ufa; Zenit Saint Petersburg
- Last updated: 30 December 2017

Maxim Shulgin (born 17 May 1983) is a Russian volleyball player, a member of Russia men's national volleyball team and Russian club Lokomotiv Novosibirsk.

== Career ==
In season 2013/14 he achieved with his Russian team Guberniya Nizhniy Novgorod silver medal of CEV Cup.

== Sporting achievements ==
=== Clubs ===
==== CEV Cup ====
- 2013/2014 - with Guberniya Nizhniy Novgorod
