= Govinder Nazran =

Govinder Nazran (1964–2008) was an artist based in Bradford, West Yorkshire, England. Govinder Nazran started his career as a graphic designer. He was mostly known for his paintings of mammals, primarily of cats and dogs, but also of horses, people and elephants. The animals were more often than not made up of Rothkoesque blocks of colour and shading and mixing colours and were often embellished with gold leaf, glitter, staples, string and other objects. Many of Govinder's animals came in pairs focusing on themes such as opposites, yin and yang, family, love, good versus evil and mr and mrs.

Apart from painting animals, Govinder produced many sculptures based upon his paintings as well as figurative and totally abstract works.

He has many collectors in the UK, US and Japan.

Govinder died in December 2008 following an accident in his home in Saltaire.
