= Magas Airport =

Airport in Ingushetia, Russia

Sulom-Bek Oskanov Magas International Airport

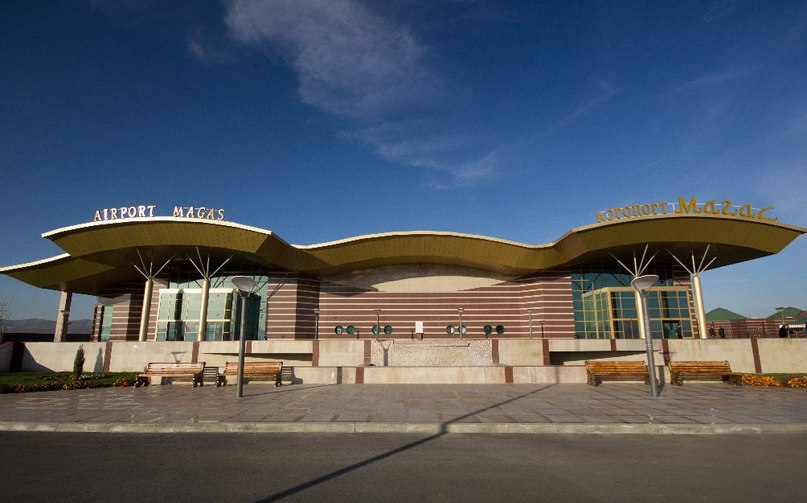
- IATA: IGT; ICAO: URMS

Summary
- Serves: Magas, Nazran
- Elevation AMSL: 1,207 ft (368 m)
- Coordinates: 43.3193°N 45.0130°E
- Website: airportmagas.ru
- Interactive map of Sulom-Bek Oskanov Magas International Airport

Runways
Direction	Length		Surface
Direction	m	ft	Surface
09/27	3,000	9,842	Asphalt concrete
10/28	2,312	7,583	Asphalt

Sulom-Bek Oskanov Magas International Airport (Ingush: Сулумбик Осканаькъан Магас Аьрсий-пачхьалкх Баьрг-ий, Russian: Международный аэропорт «Магас» им. С.С. Осканова), also known as Sleptsovskaya Airport, is an airport in the Republic of Ingushetia near Sunzha, serving the capital city of Magas and the largest regional city of Nazran. The name comes from the medieval capital of Alania. The name is translated from Ingush as a Sun City. Prior to 1992, Magas Airport was a Soviet military air base. It is sometimes referred to as Magas Oskanov Airport, in honour of Soviet General and MiG-29 pilot Sulom-Bek Oskanov.

== Services ==
Magas Airport can service Boeing-737-400/500/800, TU-154, IL-76, YAK-42, TU–134, AN–24, AN–12, YAK–40, CRJ-100/200, and helicopters.

== Airlines and destinations ==
Airlines	Destinations
Azimuth	Sochi
Pobeda	Moscow–Shermetyevo

== See also ==
- Nazran Airport
- List of airports in Russia
