= Nazran Airport =

Coordinates: 43°12.3′N 44°36.4′E

- IATA: none; ICAO: none

Summary
- Location: Nazran, Russia
- Interactive map of Nazran Airport

Nazran Airport (Ingush: Наьсаре Аэропорт, Russian: Аэропорт Назрань) is a civil airport located near Nazran, Ingushetia.

== History ==
Magomed Yevloyev, a critic of the Russian government, was shot there.

== See also ==
- Magas Airport
