= Nyagan Airport =

Airport in Khanty-Mansi Autonomous Okrug, Russia

Nyagan Airport Аэропорт Нягань
- IATA: NYA; ICAO: USHN

Summary
- Airport type: Public
- Serves: Nyagan
- Location: Nyagan, Russia
- Elevation AMSL: 361 ft / 110 m
- Coordinates: 62°6′36″N 65°36′54″E

Map
- Location of airport in Khanty-Mansi Autonomous Okrug NYA (Russia)

Runways
Direction	Length		Surface
Direction	m	ft	Surface
16/34	2,532	8,307	Concrete
- Source: DAFIF

Nyagan Airport (Russian: Аэропорт Нягань) (IATA: NYA, ICAO: USHN) is an airport in Khanty-Mansi Autonomous Okrug, Russia located 12 km east of Nyagan. It services medium-sized airliners. It was opened in 1993.

== Airlines and destinations ==
Airlines	Destinations
Red Wings Airlines	Moscow-Zhukovsky
Utair	Beloyarsky, Beryozovo, Khanty-Mansiysk, Nizhnevartovsk, Tyumen, Yekaterinburg
Yamal Airlines	Yekaterinburg

== See also ==
- List of airports in Russia
