= Uray =

Uray Урай
- Town
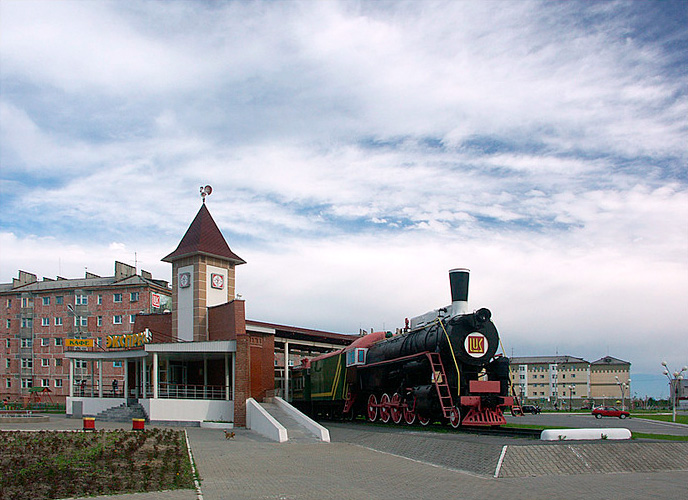

- Flag Coat of arms
- Interactive map of Uray
- Location of Uray Uray (Khanty–Mansi Autonomous Okrug)
- Coordinates: 60°08′N 64°48′E
- Country: Russia
- Federal subject: Khanty-Mansi Autonomous Okrug
- Founded: 1922
- Town status since: 1965
- Elevation: 55 m (180 ft)

Population (2010 Census)
  - Total: 39,457
  - Estimate (2025): 41,251 (+4.5%)

Administrative status
  - Subordinated to: town of okrug significance of Uray
  - Capital of: town of okrug significance of Uray

Municipal status
  - Urban okrug: Uray Urban Okrug
  - Capital of: Uray Urban Okrug
- Time zone: UTC+5 (MSK+2)
- Postal code: 628285
- Dialing code: +7 34676
- OKTMO ID: 71878000001
- Website: www.uray.ru

Uray (Russian: Ура́й; Mansi: Урай) is a town in Khanty–Mansi Autonomous Okrug, located on the Konda River 350 kilometres (220 mi) from Khanty-Mansiysk. Population: 39,457 (2010 census); 38,872 (2002 census); 37,198 (1989 Soviet census).

== History ==
It was founded as a settlement for oil field workers. It was granted town status in 1965.

== Administrative and municipal status ==
Within the framework of administrative divisions, it is incorporated as the town of okrug significance of Uray—an administrative unit with the status equal to that of the districts. As a municipal division, the town of okrug significance of Uray is incorporated as Uray Urban Okrug.

== Economy ==
Uray is the organisational centre of the oil-extracting region. In 1960, the first oil field in Siberia—the Shaimskoye field—opened here). Uray is the starting point of the Shaim–Tyumen oilpipe line. TPP Uraуneftegaz OOO "LUKoil- Zapadnaya Sibir" oil reprocessor plant is located in Uray.

Other Uray industries include food and housebuilding.

=== Transportation ===
The town is served by the Uray Airport.
