= Igrim =

Igrim Игрим Ягрим (Mansi)
- Urban-type settlement
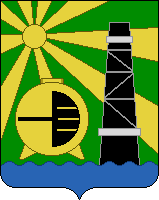
- Coat of arms
- Interactive map of Igrim
- Location of Igrim Igrim (Khanty–Mansi Autonomous Okrug)
- Coordinates: 63°11′15″N 64°24′42″E
- Country: Russia
- Federal subject: Khanty-Mansi Autonomous Okrug
- Administrative district: Beryozovsky District
- Founded: 1902

Government
  - Leader: Rustam Karimov
- Elevation: 28.6 m (94 ft)

Population (2010 Census)
  - Total: 8,775
  - Estimate (2021): 7,246 (−17.4%)
- Time zone: UTC+5 (MSK+2)
- Postal code: 628146
- Dialing code: +7 34674
- OKTMO ID: 71812154051

Igrim (Russian: Игрим, Mansi: Ягрим) is an urban locality (an urban-type settlement) in Beryozovsky District of Khanty-Mansi Autonomous Okrug, Russia, located on the right bank of the Severnaya Sosva River (a tributary of the Malaya Ob). Population: 8,775 (2010 census); 9,362 (2002 census); 11,093 (1989 Soviet census).

== Etymology ==
The word "Igrim" is of Mansi origin. However, the etymology is uncertain; according to one version, it comes from the Mansi word "ягр" (yagr), meaning "lake".

=== Previous names of the town ===
Throughout its history, the town has had many names; all however have included a form of the fundamental element 'yagr' or 'Igrim', often with a Russian adjective added:

- Egrim
- Yagrim
- Yurtu Igryumsky
- Egrim-nel
- Igrim-Lugovoy
- Igrim-Lednik
- Igrim-Gorny

== History ==
Igrim is considered to have been founded in 1902 by the merchant Beshkiltsev (on the left bank of the river, unlike the modern settlement), although the settlement features in official documents of the 19th century. The settlement at this time was named Igrim-Lugovoy. In the early history of the settlement, the main occupation of the inhabitants was fishing, and in the 1930s exiles built the settlement of Igrim-Lednik, on the right bank of the river. The main building of the settlement was the fish factory, along with its ice-house, after which the town was named (lednik is the Russian word for ice-house). Igrim-Lugovoy ceased to exist in the 1950s, and shortly after part of Igrim-Lednik was destroyed by a flood. Following the destruction of both settlements, the modern Igrim was built. It was located southeast of the remains of Igrim-Lednik, in the mountains, and was therefore initially known as Igrim-Gorny. In 1964, it was granted work settlement status. The settlement expanded rapidly in the 1960s, growing fivefold. Most of this growth was in the northwesterly direction, and forests were cleared and marshes drained to provide room for this growth.

In 1959–1961, several large gas deposits were found near the settlement. Exploration of the North Igrim deposits began in 1966 with the goal of providing Igrim with gas, and three years later a pipeline was built between Igrim and Punga (the pipeline also continued on to Serov). At this time active development of Igrim began, spurred on by the discovery of gas. The gas industry replaced fishing as the main livelihood of the inhabitants of Igrim, and today a large proportion of the population works in the gas industry, for Tyumentransgaz, a trust of Yugorkremstroygaz.

== Public buildings ==
=== Educational facilities ===
Igrim has the following educational facilities:

- 5 kindergartens
- A school of arts
- 2 high schools
- A professional college, which was founded in 1983 as a branch of the Beryozovo House of Pioneers, and achieved the status of college in 2005

=== Entertainment facilities ===
- A town library
- An exhibition hall, opened in 1984; a new building was also built in 2006
- A fitness complex
- A sports hall for young people and children
- A youth center

== Transportation ==
The settlement is a river port. It also has an airport, with an unpaved runway 2030 meters long; the airport's code is USHI. There are daily flights to Beryozovo and Khanty-Mansiysk. An important Igrim road is the 30 km road to the nearby Nizhniye Narykary. Almost the entire road consists of crushed stone, but in the summer of 2009 the first 7 km of the road were laid with asphalt. In the colder part of the year a winter road is opened to Priobye, Beryozovo, and Svetly, as well as other places in Beryozovsky District. A road which can be used all year round is also being planned; it will connect Beryozovo, Igrim, and Svetly.

== Miscellaneous ==
- The Igrim hockey team is in the second league of the Russian Championship, and won the bronze medal in 2006.
