= Roshchino International Airport =

Airport in Tyumen, Russia

Roshchino International Airport named after D. I. Mendeleev Международный аэропорт Рощино имени Д. И. Менделеева

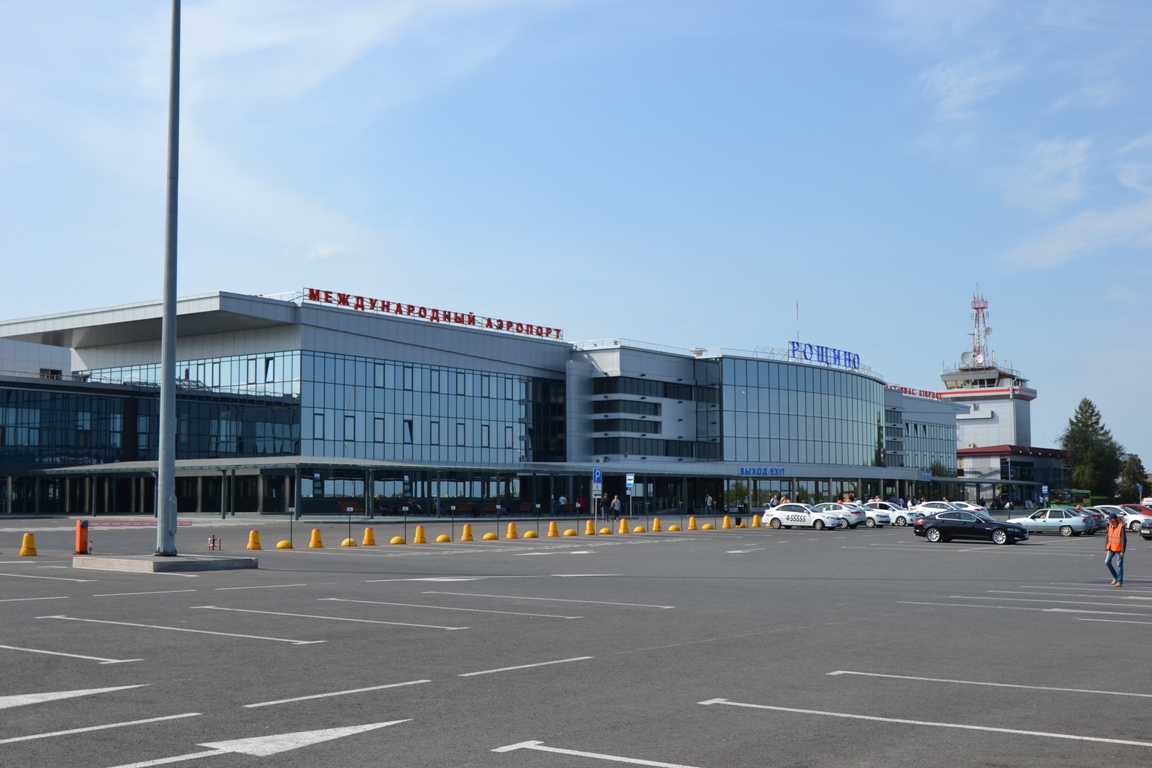
- IATA: TJM; ICAO: USTR

Summary
- Airport type: Public
- Serves: Tyumen
- Location: Tyumen, Russia
- Hub for: Utair; Yamal Airlines
- Elevation AMSL: 113 m (371 ft)
- Coordinates: 57°10′6″N 65°19′0″E
- Website: tjmport.ru

Map
- Location of airport in Tyumen Oblast

Runways
Direction	Length		Surface
Direction	m	ft	Surface
03/21	3,003	9,852	Concrete
12/30	2,704	8,871	Asphalt

Statistics (2018)
- Number of passengers: 1,978,979
- Sources: Russian Federal Air Transport Agency (see also provisional 2018 statistics)

Roshchino International Airport named after D. I. Mendeleev (IATA: TJM, ICAO: USTR) is an airport in Tyumen Oblast, Russia, located 13 km west of the city of Tyumen.

== History ==
The need for a new airport in the region was growing as oil industry was developing fast. There was a need for airport which will be able to receive An-22, An-12 aircraft for the transportation of national economy goods to the north of the Tyumen Oblast. To ensure passenger air traffic at the airport, An-24 aircraft are based. In 1964, it was decided to name the airport. On 15 May 1968 by order of the Minister of Civil Aviation of the USSR, the second Tyumen Joint Air Squad was created, which, along with the commissioning of the Roshchino Airport, allowed significantly increasing the capacity of Tyumen air gates. The Li-2 and An-24 air squadrons were relocated from Plekhanovo to Roshchino. In 1971 "Liner Hotel" was built in the vicinity of the airport. By a decree of the Presidium of the Supreme Soviet of the USSR, the Tyumen Civil Aviation Administration was awarded the Order of the Red Banner of Labour. In 1978, the hangar was put into operation for repair and maintenance of aircraft. On 10 July 1997, a new aviation enterprise was registered, open joint-stock company Roshchino Airport. In 1998, the terminal was renovated. In 2002, the lighting system was replaced. Taxiway No. 3 (RD-3) has been expanded to design dimensions. 2004 saw the completion of the reconstruction of runway no. 1, opening of an international terminal. In 2005, the reconstruction of runway-2 is completed. A new luggage compartment has opened. 2012 saw the start of construction of a new passenger terminal complex. In 2014, the largest airport holding Novaport acquired a 100% stake in OJSC Airport Roshchino (Tyumen). Overhaul of the artificial runway No. 2 and taxiways was carried out. On 27 January 2015, Tyumen Airport "Roshchino" became the first in Russia to receive aircraft via the GPS / GLONASS satellite navigation system.

It was completely demolished in 2014 due to new terminal construction. Since 2014, the facility operates by temporary scheme. As of August 2015, Roshchino International Airport terminal has a domestic section capable of handling two flights at a time and an international section capable of handling two flights. Both sections are equipped with jet bridges.

== Airlines and destinations ==
Airlines	Destinations
Aeroflot	Krasnoyarsk–International, Moscow–Sheremetyevo, Saint Petersburg, Sochi
AlMasria Universal Airlines	Seasonal charter: Sharm El Sheikh
Azimuth	Mineralnye Vody, Nizhnekamsk
Azur Air	Seasonal charter: Antalya, Hambantota–Mattala, Sharm El Sheikh
Centrum Air	Tashkent (begins 3 January 2027)
flydubai	Dubai-International (begins 19 December 2026)
Gazpromavia	Seasonal charter: Bovanenkovo, Moscow–Vnukovo, Nadym, Novy Urengoy, Stavropol, Talakan, Ufa, Yamburg
Ikar	Sochi
NordStar Airlines	Norilsk, Samara
Nordwind Airlines	Dushanbe, Kaliningrad, Khujand, Makhachkala, Moscow–Sheremetyevo, Osh, Saint Petersburg, Sochi
Pobeda	Moscow–Sheremetyevo, Moscow–Vnukovo, Saint Petersburg, Sochi
Red Wings Airlines	Batumi, Makhachkala, Nazran, Salekhard, Samara, Tbilisi, Volgograd; Seasonal charter: Hambantota–Mattala, Phuket
Rossiya	Krasnoyarsk–International, Moscow–Sheremetyevo, Saint Petersburg
S7 Airlines	Irkutsk, Novosibirsk
Sky Vision Airlines	Seasonal charter: Sharm El Sheikh
Smartavia	Saint Petersburg, Sochi
Utair	Antalya, Baku, Barnaul, Beloyarsk, Bishkek, Dubai–Al Maktoum, Igrim, Istanbul, Kazan, Khanty-Mansiysk, Khujand, Kogalym, Krasnoselkup, Mineralnye Vody, Moscow–Vnukovo, Nizhnevartovsk, Novy Urengoy, Nyagan, Omsk, Perm, Saint Petersburg, Samara, Sharm El Sheikh, Sochi, Sovetsky, Surgut, Talakan, Tarko-Sale, Tashkent, Tolka, Ufa, Uray, Yekaterinburg, Yerevan; Seasonal: Gelendzhik
Yamal Airlines	Beloyarsk, Chelyabinsk, Irkutsk, Khujand, Krasnoyarsk–International, Moscow–Vnukovo, Nadym, Nizhnevartovsk, Novosibirsk, Novy Urengoy, Noyabrsk, Sabetta, Saint Petersburg, Salekhard, Samara, Sochi, Surgut, Talakan, Tomsk, Volgograd

== Accidents and incidents ==
- On 2 April 2012, UTair Flight 120 crashed shortly after take-off from Roshchino. There were 33 fatalities amongst the 43 people on board.

== See also ==
- List of airports in Russia
- List of the busiest airports in the former USSR
