= Nyagan =

Nyagan Нягань
- Town
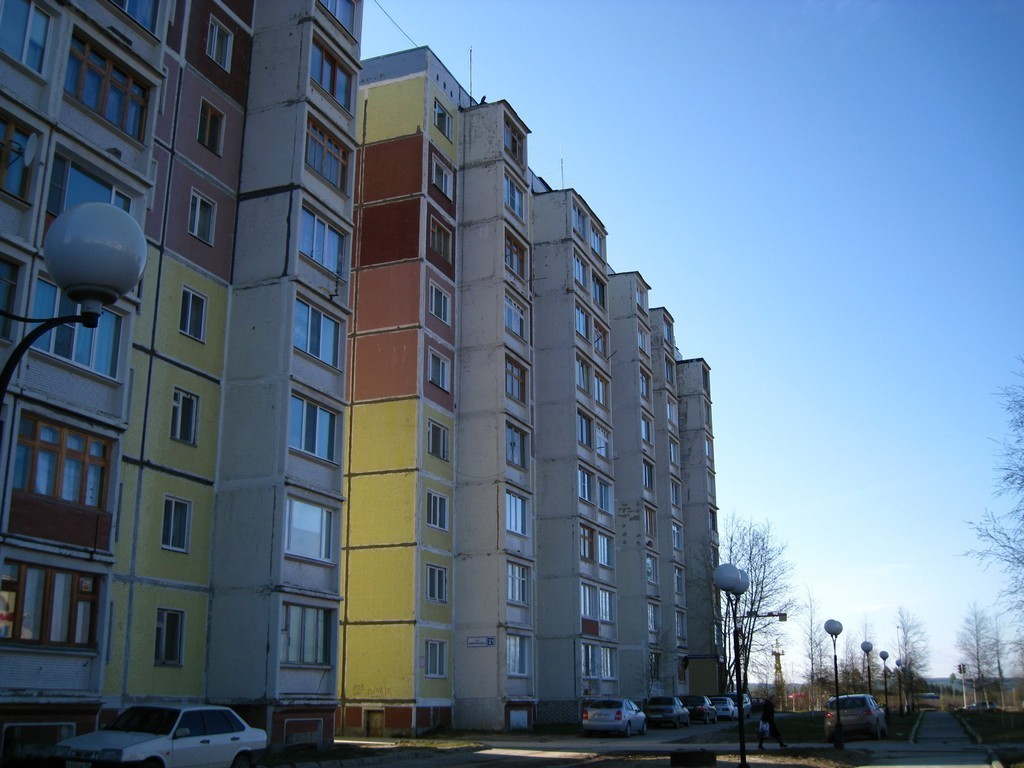
- View of Nyagan

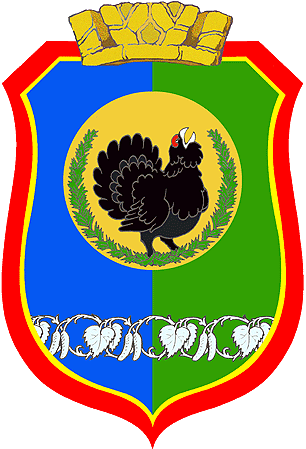
- Flag Coat of arms
- Interactive map of Nyagan
- Location of Nyagan Nyagan (Khanty–Mansi Autonomous Okrug)
- Coordinates: 62°08′N 65°23′E
- Country: Russia
- Federal subject: Khanty-Mansi Autonomous Okrug
- Founded: 1965
- Elevation: 40 m (130 ft)

Population (2010 Census)
  - Total: 54,890
  - Estimate (2021): 63,034 (+14.8%)
  - Rank: 304th in 2010

Administrative status
  - Subordinated to: town of okrug significance of Nyagan
  - Capital of: town of okrug significance of Nyagan

Municipal status
  - Urban okrug: Nyagan Urban Okrug
  - Capital of: Nyagan Urban Okrug
- Time zone: UTC+5 (MSK+2)
- Postal code: 628181
- OKTMO ID: 71879000001
- Website: www.admnyagan.ru

Nyagan (Russian: Нягань) is a town in the northwest of Khanty–Mansi Autonomous Okrug, Russia, located near the Ob River and 230 kilometers (140 mi) northwest of Khanty-Mansiysk. It is named after the Nyagan-Yugan River, a tributary of the Ob River. Population: 63,034 (2021 census); 54,890 (2010 census); 52,610 (2002 census); 54,061 (1989 Soviet census).

== Economy and history ==
Nyagan is one of the youngest towns in Western Siberia. It was established in 1965 as a forestry center village;, and was originally named Nyakh (Нях, also sometimes called Nyagyn). This Khanty language toponym (alternatively meaning 'a small river on a plain' or 'a smile') appeared on maps in the same year. The village of Nyakh was ultimately reorganized as a town and was renamed to Nyagan on August 15, 1985: the name hailed from the nearby Nyagan railway station, which in turn was named after the Nyagan-Yugan River (Khanty: Нягыньеган, romanized: Nyagin'yegan, lit. 'large river').

The town territory is a waterlogged area, and the region is notable for sudden temperature drops. The railway from Yekaterinburg to the Ob region has passed through Nyagan since April 2, 1967. Nyagan Airport, which opened in 1993, handles the Russian Antonov An-24, Yakovlev Yak-40, and Tupolev Tu-134 aircraft.

The town today has switched from a focus on forestry to a center of the petroleum and natural gas industries.

== Climate ==
Classified by Köppen-Geiger system as continental sub-arctic climate (Dfc), with warm-to-mild summers and long very cold winters. Precipitation is distributed over the course of the year, but is somewhat more in summer.

Climate data for Nyagan
Month	Jan	Feb	Mar	Apr	May	Jun	Jul	Aug	Sep	Oct	Nov	Dec	Year
Mean daily maximum °C (°F)	−16.4 (2.5)	−14.3 (6.3)	−4.4 (24.1)	3.4 (38.1)	10.9 (51.6)	18.8 (65.8)	22.7 (72.9)	18.6 (65.5)	11.9 (53.4)	1.8 (35.2)	−7.8 (18.0)	−13.4 (7.9)	2.7 (36.8)
Daily mean °C (°F)	−20.7 (−5.3)	−19.0 (−2.2)	−9.9 (14.2)	−1.8 (28.8)	5.5 (41.9)	13.4 (56.1)	17.5 (63.5)	13.6 (56.5)	7.6 (45.7)	−1.5 (29.3)	−11.7 (10.9)	−17.6 (0.3)	−2.1 (28.3)
Mean daily minimum °C (°F)	−24.9 (−12.8)	−23.7 (−10.7)	−15.4 (4.3)	−7.0 (19.4)	0.2 (32.4)	8.0 (46.4)	12.4 (54.3)	8.7 (47.7)	3.4 (38.1)	−4.8 (23.4)	−15.5 (4.1)	−21.7 (−7.1)	−6.7 (20.0)
Average precipitation mm (inches)	32 (1.3)	20 (0.8)	22 (0.9)	34 (1.3)	46 (1.8)	66 (2.6)	76 (3.0)	83 (3.3)	63 (2.5)	53 (2.1)	42 (1.7)	33 (1.3)	570 (22.6)
Source: Climate-Data.org

== Administrative and municipal status ==
Within the framework of administrative divisions, it is incorporated as the town of okrug significance of Nyagan—an administrative unit with the status equal to that of the districts. As a municipal division, the town of okrug significance of Nyagan is incorporated as Nyagan Urban Okrug.

== Culture ==
On September 1, 2000 a regional museum opened in Nyagan.

== Notable people ==
People born in Nyagan include:

- Irina Gaidamachuk (born 1972), serial killer
- Maria Sharapova (born 1987), tennis player
- Maxim Shulgin (born 1983), volleyballer

== Sources ==
- Дума Ханты-Мансийского автономного округа — Югры. Закон №43-оз от 7 июля 2004 г. «Об административно-территориальном устройстве Ханты-Мансийского автономного округа — Югры и порядке его изменения», в ред. Закона №129-оз от 9 декабря 2015 г. «Об изменениях административно-территориального устройства Ханты-Мансийского автономного округа — Югры и о внесении изменений в отдельные Законы Ханты-Мансийского автономного округа — Югры». Вступил в силу по истечении десяти дней со дня официального опубликования. Опубликован: "Новости Югры", №83, 17 июля 2004 г. (Duma of Khanty-Mansi Autonomous Okrug—Yugra. Law #43-oz of July 7, 2004 On the Administrative-Territorial Structure of Khanty-Mansi Autonomous Okrug—Yugra and on the Procedures for Its Change, as amended by the Law #129-oz of December 9, 2015 On the Changes to the Administrative-Territorial Structure of Khanty-Mansi Autonomous Okrug—Yugra and on Amending Various Laws of Khanty-Mansi Autonomous Okrug—Yugra. Effective as of the day which after ten days after the official publication date.).
- Дума Ханты-Мансийского автономного округа — Югры. Закон №63-оз от 25 ноября 2004 г. «О статусе и границах муниципальных образований Ханты-Мансийского автономного округа — Югры», в ред. Закона №129-оз от 9 декабря 2015 г. «Об изменениях административно-территориального устройства Ханты-Мансийского автономного округа — Югры и о внесении изменений в отдельные Законы Ханты-Мансийского автономного округа — Югры». Вступил в силу по истечении десяти дней со дня официального опубликования и до 1 января 2006 года применяется в целях реализации статей 84, 85 Федерального закона от 06.10.2003 №131-ФЗ. Опубликован: "Новости Югры", №143, 7 декабря 2004 г. (Duma of Khanty-Mansi Autonomous Okrug—Yugra. Law #63-oz of November 25, 2004 On the Status and Borders of the Municipal Formations of Khanty-Mansi Autonomous Okrug—Yugra, as amended by the Law #129-oz of December 9, 2015 On the Changes to the Administrative-Territorial Structure of Khanty-Mansi Autonomous Okrug—Yugra and on Amending Various Laws of Khanty-Mansi Autonomous Okrug—Yugra. Effective as of the day which after ten days after the official publication date; also in effect until January 1, 2006 in order to meet the requirements of Articles 84, 85 of the Federal Law #131-FZ of October 6, 2003.).
