= Uray Airport =

Airport in Uray, Russia

- IATA: URJ; ICAO: USHU

Summary
- Airport type: Public
- Serves: Uray
- Location: Uray, Russia
- Elevation AMSL: 190 ft / 58 m
- Coordinates: 60°7′0″N 64°50′0″E

Map
- Location of airport in Khanty-Mansi Autonomous Okrug URJ (Russia)

Runways
Direction	Length		Surface
Direction	m	ft	Surface
18/36	2,300	7,546	Concrete
- Source: DAFIF

Uray Airport (IATA: URJ, ICAO: USHU) is an airport in Khanty-Mansi Autonomous Okrug, Russia located 4 km southeast of Uray. It services up to medium-sized airliners.

== Airlines and destinations ==
Airlines	Destinations
Utair	Khanty-Mansiysk, Surgut, Tyumen

== See also ==
- List of airports in Russia
