= Khanty-Mansiysk Airport =

Airport in Russia

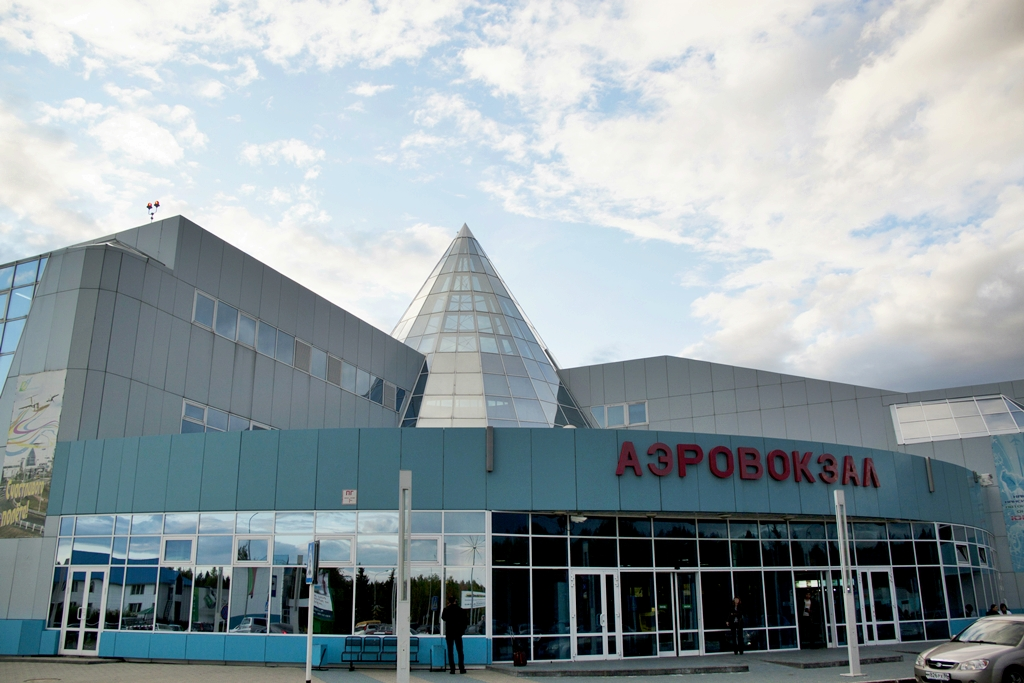
- IATA: HMA; ICAO: USHH

Summary
- Airport type: Public
- Serves: Khanty-Mansiysk
- Location: Khanty-Mansiysk, Russia
- Elevation AMSL: 75 ft (23 m)
- Coordinates: 61°01′42″N 69°05′12″E
- Website: ugraavia.ru/

Map
- Location of airport in Khanty-Mansi Autonomous Okrug HMA (Russia)

Runways
| Direction | Length | | Surface |
| Direction | m | ft | Surface |
|---|---|---|---|
| 06/24 | 2,800 | 9,187 | Asphalt |
- Source: DAFIF

Khanty-Mansiysk Airport (IATA: HMA, ICAO: USHH), also listed as Khantymansiysk Airport, is an airport in Khanty-Mansi Autonomous Okrug, Russia located 5 km (3.1 mi) northeast of Khanty-Mansiysk. It services medium-size airliners.

== Airlines and destinations ==
| Airlines | Destinations |
|---|---|
| azimuth | Mineralnye Vody |
| RusLine | Chelyabinsk, Naryan-Mar, Salekhard, Sukhumi (Note: Sukhumi is a continuation of Saratov flights as the same flight number) |
| S7 Airlines | Novosibirsk |
| Utair | Nyagan, Omsk, Tyumen, Ufa; Seasonal: Sochi |

== See also ==
- List of airports in Russia
