= List of airlines of Russia =

This is a list of aircraft operators which are licensed by the Federal Air Transport Agency. All airlines are banned from flying into EU airspace since 2022.

== Passenger and cargo airlines ==
=== Major ===
This is a list of the major airlines in Russia.

Airline	Airline (in Russian)	Licence #	ICAO	IATA	Domestic code	Callsign	Photo
Aeroflot	ПАО «Аэрофлот — российские авиалинии»	1	AFL	SU	СУ	AEROFLOT	
Aurora	ОАО «Авиакомпания «Аврора»	486	SHU	HZ	ИЕ	AURORA	
Nordstar	ОАО «Авиакомпания «НордСтар»	452	TYA	Y7	ТИ	TAIMYR	
Ikar	ООО «Авиакомпания «Икар»	36	KAR	EO	АЬ	KRASJET	
Red Wings Airlines	АО «Ред Вингс»	57	RWZ	WZ	ИН	AIR RED	
Rossiya	АО «Авиакомпания «Россия»	2	SDM	FV	ПЛ	RUSSIA	
S7 Airlines	ПАО «Авиакомпания «Сибирь»	31	SBI	S7	С7	SIBERIAN AIRLINES	
Ural Airlines	ОАО «Авиакомпания «Уральские авиалинии»	18	SVR	U6	У6	SVERDLOVSK AIR	
Utair	ПАО «Авиакомпания «ЮТэйр»	6	UTA	UT	ЮТ	UTAIR	
Yakutia Airlines	ОАО «Авиакомпания «Якутия»	464	SYL	R3	ЯК	AIR YAKUTIA	
Yamal Airlines	ОАО «Авиационная транспортная компания «Ямал»	142	LLM	YC	ЛА	YAMAL	

=== Minor ===
Airline	Airline (in Russian)	License #	ICAO	IATA	Domestic code	Callsign	Photo
Alrosa Mirny Air Enterprise	ЗАО «Авиакомпания АЛРОСА»	230	DRU	6R	ЯМ	MIRNY	
Art Avia	ООО «Арт Авиа»	563	ATI			ART AVIA	
Azimuth	АО «Авиакомпания АЗИМУТ»	576	AZO	A4		AZIMUTH	
Chukotavia	Федеральное государственное унитарное предприятие «ЧукотАВИА»	108	ADZ		АД	CHUKOTAVIA	
Gazpromavia	ООО «Авиапредприятие «Газпром авиа»	423	GZP	4G	ОП	GAZPROM	
IrAero	ЗАО «Авиакомпания «ИрАэро»	480	IAE	IO	РД	IRAERO	
Izhavia	ОАО «Ижавиа»	479	IZA	I8	ИЖ	IZHAVIA	
Khabarovsk Airlines	Краевое государственное унитарное предприятие «Хабаровские авиалинии»	459	KHF		НИ	KHABAROVSK	
Komiaviatrans	ОАО «Комиавиатранс»	174	KMA	KO	ИГ	KOMI AVIA	
Kosmos Airlines	АО «Производственное объединение «Космос»	444	KSM	K6	ГК	KOSMOS	
KrasAvia	АО «КрасАвиа»	578	SSJ	KV	ЭК	SIBERIAN SKY	
Polar Airlines	ОАО «Авиакомпания «Полярные авиалинии»	538	RKA	PI	ЯП	AIR SAKHA	
RusLine	ЗАО «Авиационная Компания «РусЛайн»	225	RLU	7R	РГ	RUSLINE AIR	
Severstal Air Company	ООО «Авиапредприятие «Северсталь»	251	SSF	D2	Д2	SEVERSTAL	
Taiga Air			TGA				
Turukhan Airlines	ООО «Авиакомпания «Турухан»	90	TRH		УТ	TURUKHAN	
UVT Aero	АО «ЮВТ АЭРО»	567	UVT	RT	ЮВ	UVT	
Vityaz-Aero	ООО «Авиационная компания «Витязь-Аэро»	536			ЯФ		
Yamal Air Company	ООО «Авиационная компания «Ямал»	526			ЯЛ		

=== Low-cost airlines ===
Airline	Airline (in Russian)	Licence #	ICAO	IATA	Domestic code	Callsign	Photo
Pobeda	ООО «Победа»	562	PBD	DP	ДР	POBEDA	
Smartavia	ЗАО «Смартавиа — региональные авиалинии»	466	AUL	5N	5Н	ARCHANGELSK AIR	

=== Air charter ===
Airline	Airline (in Russian)	Licence #	ICAO	IATA	Domestic code	Callsign	Photo
Azur Air	Азур Эйр		AZV	ZF		AZUR AIR	
I-Fly			RSY	F7		RUSSIAN SKY	
Nordwind Airlines	ООО «Северный ветер»		NWS	N4		NORDLAND	
North-West Air Company	OOO «Северо-Западная авиакомпания»		NWC	0E		WEST WAY	

=== Cargo ===
Airline	Airline (in Russian)	Licence #	ICAO	IATA	Domestic code	Callsign	Photo
AirBridgeCargo	ООО «Авиакомпания ЭйрБриджКарго»	501	ABW	RU	БК	AIRBRIDGE CARGO	
ATRAN	ООО «АТРАН»	499	VAS	V8	ЮЛ	ATRAN	
Aviacon Zitotrans	ОАО «Авиакомпания «Авиакон Цитотранс»	442	AZS	ZR	РЦ	ZITOTRANS	
Aviastar-TU	ООО «Авиационная компания «Авиастар-ТУ»	458	TUP	4B	ЦТ	TUPOLEVAIR	
Sky Gates Airlines			SAY	U3		SKY PATH	
UTair Cargo	ЗАО «ЮТэйр»	53	TUM		ПП	TUMTEL	
Volga-Dnepr	ООО «Авиакомпания Волга-Днепр»	21	VDA	VI	ВД	VOLGA-DNEPR	

=== Other ===
Commercial air transportation of passengers and cargo:

Airline	Airline (in Russian)	Licence #	ICAO	IATA	Domestic code	Callsign	Photo
2nd Arkhangelsk United Aviation Division	АО «2-й Архангельский объединенный авиаотряд»	463	OAO		АЧ	DVINA	
AeroBratsk	ОАО «Аэропорт Братск»	240	BRP		БВ	AEROBRA	
AeroGeo	ООО «АэроГео»	517			ЕГ	AEROGEO	
Aerokuzbas	ООО «Аэрокузбасс»	211	NKZ		БН	NOVOKUZNETSK	
Aeroservice	ООО «Аэросервис» (Забайкальский край, г. Чита)	561			АЯ		
Altay Airlines	ООО «Алтайские авиалинии»	549			БШ		
AltayAvia	ООО «АлтайАвиа»	573					
Amur Aircompany	ООО «Авиационная компания «Амур»	555			АП		
Amur Aviation Base	Государственное автономное учреждение Амурской области «Амурская авиабаза»	527			ЦХ		
Argo JSK	АО «Авиакомпания «АРГО»	124			ТЯ		
Avialift Vladivostok	ЗАО «Авиалифт Владивосток»	120	VLV		ДВ	VLADLIFT	
Aviaservis	ООО «Авиасервис»	560	KZN		ТБ		
Aviashelf	АО «Авиационная компания Авиашельф»	9			ЮШ		
AviaTIS	ООО «Авиационные Технологии Инвестиции Сервис»	575					
Baltic Airlines	ЗАО «Авиакомпания «Балтийские авиалинии»	237	BLL		БП	BALTIC AIRLINES	
Barkol Airlines	ООО «Авиакомпания «Баркол»	126	BKL		ИР		
Dagestan (aircompany)	ООО «Авиакомпания «Дагестан»	574					
Dalnerechensk Avia	ООО «Дальнереченск Авиа»	549			ДА		
Delta K Ltd	ООО «Производственно — коммерческое авиационное предприятие «Дельта К»	114			ШИ		
Dexter Air Taxi	ЗАО «Авиа Менеджмент Груп»	481	DXT		ДТ	DEXTER	
Elcovka	ЗАО «Авиапредприятие «Ельцовка»	532			ЕД		
Erofei	ООО «Ерофей»	580					
Gelix Airlines	АО «Авиакомпания «Геликс»	382	GLX		ПЮ	RUSSIAN BIRD	
Heliport-M	ООО «Хелипорт-М»	571					
Jet Air Group	ОАО «Джет Эйр Групп»	491	JSI		СЭ	SISTEMA	
Kamchatskoe Air Enterprise	АО «Камчатское авиационное предприятие»	566	PTK		ДЕ	PETROKAM	
Kazan Air Enterprise	ОАО «Казанское авиапредприятие»	356			ЛЖ		
Konvers Avia	ЗАО «Авиационная компания Конверс Авиа»	419	CVS		ЕШ		
Kostroma Air Enterprise	ОАО «Костромское авиапредприятие»	489			КБ		
LUKoil-Avia	ООО «ЛУКОЙЛ-АВИА»	469	LUK		ЛЩ	LUKOIL	
Meridian	Авиакомпания «Меридиан»	238	MMM		МП	AVIAMERIDIAN	
MOSCOW AVIATION CENTRE	Государственное казенное учреждение города Москвы «Московский авиационный центр»	546			ЦФ		
Naryan-Mar United Aviation Squadron	АО «Нарьян-Марский объединённый авиаотряд»	497			НЯ		
Nizhnevartovskavia	ОАО «Нижневартовскавиа»	470	NVK		НП	VARTOVSKAVIA	
Norilsk Avia	АО «Норильск Авиа»	568			ПН		
Orenburzhye	Федеральное государственное унитарное предприятие «Международный аэропорт «Оренбург»	539	ORG	O7	УЭ	ORENBURZHYE	
PANH HELICOPTERS	ОАО «Научно-производственная компания «ПАНХ»	69	PNH		ЮФ	KUBAN LIK	
Petrozavodsk Airport	Бюджетное учреждение Республики Карелия «Аэропорт «Петрозаводск»	564			ПЕ		
Polar-Avia	ООО «Поляр-Авиа»	577					
Rosvertol-Avia	ЗАО «Авиакомпания «Роствертол-Авиа»	514	RVT		ВЛ	ROSTVERTOL	
Rusaero	ЗАО «Авиационная компания «РУССЭЙР»	553	RUR		РЛ	RUSSTAR	
RusJet	ОАО «Авиакомпания «РусДжет»	498	RSJ		ШТ	RUSJET	
Severo-zapad	ООО «Авиакомпания «Северо-Запад»	548			ЕИ		
Siburskaja Ljegkaja Aviacija	ООО «Сибирская Легкая Авиация»	552			СЛ		
Sirius-Aero	ООО «Авиакомпания «Сириус-Аэро»	207	CIG		ВЦ	SIRIUS AERO	
SPECIAL DETACHMENT - RUSSIA, FED.ST.B.I.	ФГБУ «Специальный лётный отряд «Россия» Управления делами Президента Российской Федерации	530	RSD		ЛР	STATE AERO	
Strezhevskoje Aviation Enterprise	ООО Авиакомпания «Стрежевское Авиапредприятие»	582					
Tulpar Air	ООО «Авиакомпания «Тулпар Эйр»	359					
Uktus	ЗАО «Авиакомпания «Уктус»	540	UKT		УБ	UKTUS	
Unoversal-Avia	ГП «Универсал-Авиа»	565			УД		
Nefteyugansk United Airline Transportation Company	ОАО «ЮТэйр — Вертолётные услуги»	34	NFT		НФ	NEFTEAVIA	
Aviation Industrial Company Vektor	ООО «Авиационно — Промышленная Компания ВЕКТОР»	569	VEK		ЖЦ	ROTCEV	
Vologda Aviation Enterprise	ОАО «Вологодское авиационное предприятие»	195	VGV		ВГ	VOLOGDA AIR	
Vostok Airlines	ОАО «Авиационная компания «Восток»	266	VTK		ДХ	VOSTOK	

== Government airlines ==
Airline	Airline (in Russian)	Licence #	ICAO	IATA	Domestic code	Callsign	Photo
223rd Flight Unit	ФГКУ «Государственная авиакомпания «223 летный отряд» Министерства обороны Российской Федерации	239	CHD		ЮЦ	CHKALOVSK-AVIA	
224th Flight Unit	ОАО «Государственная авиакомпания «224 летный отряд»	529	TTF		ЮИ	CARGO UNIT	
Russian Air Force			RFF			RUSSIAN AIRFORCE	
Air rescue company MChS Rossii	ФГБУ «Авиационно-спасательная компания Министерства Российской Федерации по делам гражданской обороны, чрезвычайным ситуациям и ликвидации последствий стихийных бедствий»	570	SUM		РФ	SUMES	

== Aerial work ==
Aerial work (not licensed for commercial transportation of passengers and cargo):

Airline	Airline (in Russian)	Licence #	ICAO	IATA	Domestic code	Callsign	Photo
Amega	ООО «Авиакомпания «АМЕГА»				ЭГ		
Belogorie	ООО «АВИА Белогорье»		BLO		БЛ		
Beriev	ПАО «Таганрогский авиационный научно-технический комплекс имени Г. М. Бериева»						
Heli-drive	ООО «Хели-драйв»				РЖ		
Jet-2000	ООО «Авиакомпания ДЖЕТ-2000»		JTT				
Light Air	ЗАО Авиакомпания «Лайт Эйр»				ПУ		
Lukiaviatrans	ООО «Лукиавиатранс»		LKV		УЛ		
MBK-S	ОАО «МБК-С»		PLG			PILGRIM	
Meridian+	ООО «Научно-производственное аэрогеодезическое предприятие «Меридиан+»		MDN		ЦЕ		
Moscow Aircraft Overhaul Plant	ЗАО «Московский авиационно-ремонтный завод ДОСААФ»				ДУ		
Northwest Air Base	Государственное учреждение Республики Карелия «Северо-Западная база авиационной охраны лесов»				БХ		
Orion-x	ООО «Орион-Икс»		OIX			ORIONIX	
Petropavlovsk	ЗАО «Управляющая компания «Петропавловск»		PPV		ПВ	PAVLOVSK	
Sibia	ООО «Авиакомпания «СИБИА»		SBD		ШВ	SIBIA	
Smolenskaerotrans	ЗАО «Смоленскаэротранс»				УФ		
State ATM Corporation	ФГУП «Государственная корпорация по организации воздушного движения в Российской Федерации»		OVD		ВП		
Ulyanovsk Higher Civil Aviation School	ФГБОУ ВПО «Ульяновское высшее авиационное училище гражданской авиации (институт)»		UHS		ЖК	PILOT AIR	
Vertical-T	ООО «Авиакомпания Вертикаль-Т»		VLT		ИТ		
Vzlet	ЗАО «НПО «Взлет»		VZL		НБ		
Zonalnoye Air Enterprise	ОАО «Авиапредприятие «Зональное»				ДФ		

== See also ==
- List of defunct airlines of Russia
- List of small airlines and helicopter airlines of Russia
- List of VIP airlines of Russia
- List of airports in Russia
- Babyflot
- List of air carriers banned in the European Union
