= List of small airlines and helicopter airlines of Russia =

This is a list of small airlines and helicopter airlines of Russia.

Name	ICAO	Callsign	Founded	Operating from	Details	Incidents	Fleet	Aircraft	Website
Aero-Transit (Аэро-транзит)			2006	Achinsk Airport, Krasnoyarsk	Passenger and cargo charter airline, specialising in aerial work and the transportation of geologists.	-	Antonov An-2, Antonov An-3		
AeroGeo (АэроГео)			2005	Krasnoyarsk	Charter operator which carries out helicopter maintenance as well as passenger and cargo transfer, and aerial work	On 15 March 2011, a Mil Mi-8 (RA-24436) rolled on landing at the helipad at Krasnoyarsk and burst into flames. 18-June-2012, Mil Mi-2 rolled during take-off in Krasnoyarsk (Boguchany) and burst into flames.	Eurocopter AS350B3, Eurocopter ES130B4, Mil Mi-2, Mil Mi-8, Robinson R44, Antonov An-2, Cessna 208B Grand Caravan		
Aeroservice (Авиакомпания «Аэросервис»)			2010	Krasnodar	Charter airline based in Makhachkala which operated regular flights to Moscow and Saint Petersburg until June 2012. In 2011 the airline acquired a Cessna T182T for aerial work and firefighting. On June 20, 2012 the President of the airline, Tap Ilyich, announced all scheduled flights to be canceled; the airline solely operates flights for aerial work as of July 2012.	-	1 x Cessna T182T, 3 x Antonov An-2		-
Altai Airlines (Алтайские авиалинии)			1998	Barnaul, Pavlovsky	Siberian passenger and cargo charter airline providing aerial services, aerial photography, aircraft maintenance and fuel supply.	-	Antonov An-2, Robinson R-44, 18 x Mil Mi-8		
Argo (Авиакомпания АРГО)			1991	Lenina, Surgut	Specialises in aerial work with its Mil helicopter fleet. Services include charter passenger and cargo flights (including aerial work).	-	Mil Mi-8		
Aero-Kamov (Аэро-Камов)	MSV	AERAFKAM	1994	Moscow, Bykovo	Operates a fleet of Kamov helicopters for aerial work, pipe replacement, powerline/support/cabling installation, ski-lifts and items atop skyscrapers. They also carry out fire-fighting, freight charters and logging. In addition, they carry out crew training and maintenance and sale of other Kamov helicopters.	-	2 x Kamov Ka-32A (RA-31035, RA-31603), 3 x Kamov Ka-32T (RA-31005, RA-31011, RA-31592)	-	
AGAT Airline					2 Antonov An-3, 3 Antonov An-2				
Aviakhim (Rosaviahim) (Авиакомпания «Авиахим»)			2002	Rostov	Specialises in crop spraying but also lease their aircraft for aerial work.	April 25, 2010 - Antonov An-2R RA-40490 - Verkhnyaya Khava on crop-spraying flight 4 km north. Windy take-off conditions meant plane did not gather enough speed to take off; ran into field and caught fire when overturned. Fire put out quickly, no injuries.	Mil Mi-2		
Avialift Vladivostok (Авиалифт Владивосток)	VLV	VLADLIFT	1991	Primorsky Krai	Charter cargo airline operates a fleet of Kamov helicopters and specialises in global airlifting of large or bulky items. Their main activity is aerial logging, particularly in Malaysia. Unlike most Russian small charter airlines, they have a regional office on another continent - in Malaysia	RA-31575 Kamov KA-32C, 17-April-2004, Nganga (Malaysia) - Right engine hesitated with metallic rattle and strong vibration. Rapid deceleration; crew turned back but did not remove load. Aircraft plunged and rolled on mountain slope. Captain killed, two crew injured; second engine failure was verdict.	9 x Kamov Ka-32		
Aviashelf (Авиашельф)			1997	Yuzhno-Sakhalinsk	Russian charter helicopter operator carries out passenger and cargo charters as well as aerial still and video photography, search-and-rescue, pipeline and ice monitoring, and medical charters. The helicopters are capable of carrying bulky loads externally.	-	10 x Mil Mi-8		
Baltic Airlines (Авиакомпания «Балтийские авиалинии»)	BLL	BALTIC AIRLINES	?	Saint Petersburg	Helicopter sightseeing airline. They operate tours as well as air-taxis, helicopter rentals for film productions, advertising flights, parachute jumping, search-and-rescue and medical transfers	6 April 2012 - Sortavala - helicopter crash-landed on frozen lake while trying to land during blizzard. All four occupants injured including Bank of St Petersburg CEO Alexander Saveliev and his companion	5 x Mil Mi-8		
Barkol Airlines (ООО «Авиакомпания «Баркол»)	BKL	BARCOL	1996						
Delta K (Производственно — коммерческое авиационное предприятие «Дельта К»)			1992	Chulman Airport, Neryungri, Sakha Republic	Charter aircraft operator which has its own football team, 'Delta'. Provides aviation services to the President and Government of the Sakha Republic and to members of the Russian Government as well as passenger and cargo charter, and aerial services. Supervisory procedures implemented on June 25, such implementation often due to concerns over financial performance. Awarded 'Diploma and gratitude of President of the Sakha (Yakutia) Republic for labor achievements' in 2005 and Neryungri District contest in 2011	-	3 x Antonov An-2 (RA-06370, RA-07394, and RA-32506), 8 x Mil Mi-8T (Includes RA-22403, RA-22743, RA-22750, RA-22771, RA-22946 and RA-24524 with two further Mi-8 added since the end of 2009)		
Gelix Airlines (Авиакомпания «Геликс»)	GLX	RUSSIAN BIRD	1991	Perm	Carries out patrols, search-and-rescue, air-ambulance, air-freight and charter passenger flights (especially for hunting, fishing and extreme sports). It has won the "Crystal Earthmaker" award (of Great Britain) as well as "The American Golden Certificate of International Prestige". In April 2011 the airline was sold to a mystery buyer	14 September 2009 - The pilot and passenger were killed in a helicopter crash involving a Robinson R-44[9] near Lugovskoy (Perm).	10 x Mil Mi-8		
Ikar (Авиакомпания «Икар»)			1993	Magadan	Russian helicopter airline based in Magadan, operating a fleet of Mil Mi-8 helicopters for aerial cargo operations (mainly carrying bulky loads externally). The company is also responsible for patrolling forest fires in the Magadan locality of Russia.	On December 3, 1995, a Mil Mi-8AMT (RA-25581) leased to Investkorp of Papua New Guinea - Rapid deceleration during poor visibility; helicopter crashed and mechanic was seriously injured. Insufficiently trained, uncertified crew flying illegally outside of CIS.	Mil Mi-8		-
Kamchatka Airlines (Авиакомпания «Камчатские авиалинии»)			1997	Kamchatka, Petropavlovsk-Kamchatsky, Elizovo, Esso (Kamchatka Krai)	Russian charter airline specialising in passenger and mail cargo charters including aerial tours. They also have the ability to perform emergency and medical operations, ski flights, aerial surveys and patrols, and aerial firefighting.	-	14 x Mil Mi-8	-	
Komiaviatrans (Комиавиатранс)	KMA	KOMI AVIA	1967	Syktyvkar, Komi Republic	The airline was established in 1967 as the Aeroflot Komi Directorate and operates passenger and cargo charter services within Russia and wet leases in Asia, Africa and Europe with its fleet of Mil helicopters as well as aerial works (including patrols - especially of pipelines, medical transport, search-and-rescue, and environmental observation). Previously known as Komiavia	-	32 x Mil Mi-8, 33 x Mil Mi-2		
Konvers Avia (ЗАО «Авиакомпания Конверс Авиа»)	CVS	CONVERS	1995						
Moscow Aircraft Overhaul Plant (ЗАО «Московский авиационно-ремонтный завод РОСТО»)			1997			11 x Mil Mi-2			
Naryan-Mar United Aviation Squadron (ОАО «Нарьян-Марский объединенный авиаотряд»)									
Nefteyugansk United Airline Transport Company (Нефтеюганский объединенный авиационный отряд)	NFT	NEFTEAVIA	1965	Nefteyugansk	Founded simultaneously with the construction of Nefteyugansk and dedicated to helicopter transport. On April 1, 1975, Nefteyugansk formed a joint air squadron, two years later it was converted into the current United Air Nefteyugansk. In the 90s it began to work abroad: in Colombia, Angola, Namibia, Ecuador. In 1999 the company was recorded in the official register of suppliers of aviation services for the UN. In the early 2000s there was a fight over shareholders which resulted in the purchase of the airline by UTair. Has a heliport with an area of 43 hectares. Specialises in the transportation of passengers and cargo flights for the provision of medical care, maintenance of forestry and other rescue operations.	December 20, 2011 about 07:25 (Moscow time) - Hard landing of Mi-26T RA-06121 in a fierld in Taylakovskogo (Tyumen region), the helicopter overturned and caught fire. Of the six crew members on board, Eroshkin Igor died; others suffered injuries of varying severity.	63 x Mil Mi-26T, 76 x Mil Mi-8, 15 x Kamov KA-32T, 3 x Robinson R-44		
Nizhnevartovskavia (Нижневартовскавиа)	NVK	VARTOVSKAVIA	1965	Nizhnevartovsk	Nizhnevartovskavia is a subsidiary of Nizhnevartovsk Airport which carries out charter passenger and aerial flights on its helicopter fleet. The Mil helicopters have the facility of transporting cargo suspended from them, which enables their use in the construction trade to lift large/bulky components. Medical flights and search-and-rescue operations are also performed with these helicopters.	-	Mil Mi-8		
PANH (Научно-производственная компания «Панх»)	PNH	KUBAN LIK	1964	Krasnodar and Magadan	Russian charter airline. They operate a wide range of helicopters for use with construction, firefighting, off-shore transport, charter passenger and cargo transport, support and patrols for the oil and gas industry, air-taxi services, search-and-rescue, and aerial photography. They are licensed to carry out aircraft maintenance and they have bases to do this in Krasnodar, Murmansk, Afghanistan and Kazakhstan. They also have their own research centre which supports the development of equipment for aerial works.	-	Mil Mi-2, Mil Mi-8, Mil Mi-26T, Kamov Ka-32, PZL W-3 Sokół		
Privolzhsky Regional Air Company (Приволжская региональная авиакомпания)			2002	Smyshlyaevka Airport, Samara	Primary activity is crop spraying though they also carry out aerial survey work.	-	Antonov An-2		-
Rostvertol-Avia (Авиакомпания «Роствертол-Авиа»)	RNB	ROSBALT	2004	Rostov-on-Don	Rostvertol-Avia is a charter helicopter airline based in Rostov-on-Don, Russia, which specialises in charter freight operations (both within the helicopters and suspended from them) especially for the construction industry. They propose to expand their fleet.	-	3 x Mil Mi-26T (RA-06293, RA-06299, RA-06259), Mil Mi-171 (RA-22450)		
Sokol Airlines (Авиакомпания «Сокол»)	PIV	AIR SOKOL	1993	Krasnodar	Sokol specialises in aerial work but also provides passenger and cargo charter. They carry out aerial monitoring of oil and gas pipelines as well as aerial photography.	-	Mil Mi-2, Mil Mi-8T, formerly Mil Mi-8MTV, Mil Mi-26, Kamov KA-32, Antonov An-24		
South-Line (Авиакомпания «Юг–Лайн»)			1998	Krasnodar	South-Line is a specialist airline based in Krasnodar, Russia. It carries out chemical transportation, aerial photography, forest patrols and crop spraying as well as oil and gas transit.	-	16 x Antonov An-2		
Turukhan (Авиакомпания «Турухан»)			2001	Turukhansk	Turukhan, or Turuhan, is a Russian airline based in the Krasnyoarsk territory. It solely operates Mil-8 helicopters for charter passenger and cargo use as well as aerial operations, search and rescue, patient transport and building/construction projects.	-	18 x Mil Mi-8		
Ufa Airlines (Авиакомпания «Уфимские авиалинии»)			2001	Ufa	Ufa Airlines is a charter airline based in the Republic of Bashkortostan. It is the only airline in Russia (as of 2006) to provide regular medical charters. Ufa Airlines' other services include cargo transportation, aerial surveys and photography, aerial agricultural work, aerial advertising, sightseeing and charter passenger flights, emergency and search-and-rescue flights and crew training.	-	11 x Antonov An-2, 10 x Robinson R-44, 1 x MBB/Kawasaki BK 117		
UralAviaTrans (Уралавиатранс)			2000	Tryokhgorny, Chelyabinsk	Uses its sole Mil helicopter to ship cargo and to carry out overhead inspections, as well as operating fire-extinguishing duties	-	1 x Mil Mi-26T (RA-06273)		
Vertical-T (Авиакомпания «Вертикаль-Т»)	VLT	VERTICAL	1992	Zmeyevo Airport, Tver	Russian helicopter operator. In 2006 it relocated to its current base at Zmeyevo Airport (Tver). Vertical-T is a charter operator but also facilitates parachute-jumping, fire-extinguishing and fuelling.	-	Mil Mi-8, Mil Mi-26T		
Viraj (Вираж)				Shakhty, near Rostov	Viraj is an airline based in the Rostov region of Russia.	-	22 X Antonov An-2		-
Vzlet (ЗАО «НПО «Взлет»)	VZL	VZLYET	1972						-

== See also ==
- List of airlines
- Babyflot
- List of airlines of Russia
- List of VIP airlines of Russia
- List of airports in Russia
