= List of airline codes (J) =

This is a list of all airline codes. The table lists the IATA airline designators, the ICAO airline designators and the airline call signs (telephony designator). Historical assignments are also included for completeness.

== Codes ==
Airline codes
IATA	ICAO	Airline	Call sign	Country	Comments
	JTN		JET TEST	United States	
	JGJ	Jinggong Jet	GLOBAL JINGGONG	China	2014, 2023
	JNY	Journey Aviation	ROCKBAND	United States	2023: Callsign "ROCKBAND"; Former Call Sign/Telephony Designator: UNIJET-ROCKBAND (2014)
	JKR	Justice Air Charter	JOKER	United States	Trading name for Reliant Aviation, allocated in 2014
	JWD	Jayawijaya Dirgantara		Indonesia	
	JCB	JCB (heavy equipment manufacturer)	JAYSEEBEE	United Kingdom	
	RFX	J P Hunt Air Carriers	REFLEX	United States	J P Hunt Air Carriers
XM		J-Air	J AIR	Japan	
JC	JEX	JAL Express	JANEX	Japan	
JO	JAZ	JALways	JALWAYS	Japan	
	JDA	JDAviation	JAY DEE	United Kingdom	
	JDP	JDP Lux	RED PELICAN	Luxembourg	
	JHM	JHM Cargo Expreso		Costa Rica	
	TQM	JM Family Aviation	TACOMA	United States	
MT	JMC	JMC Airlines	JAYEMMSEE	United Kingdom	
1M		JSC Transport Automated Information Systems		Russia	
	JSJ	JS Air	JS CHARTER	Pakistan	
	JES	JS Aviation	JAY-ESS AVIATION	Mexico	
	JCK	Jackson Air Services	JACKSON	Canada	
JI	JAE	Jade Cargo International	JADE CARGO	China	defunct
	JAW	Jamahiriya Airways	JAW	Libya	
	JMB	Jambo Africa Airlines	JAMBOAFRICA	Democratic Republic of Congo	
	WWW	Janet	JANET	United States	de facto name
	FJX	Jet Sky Cargo and Air Charter		Kenya	
	JAK	Jana-Arka	YANZAR	Kazakhstan	
	JAX	Janair	JANAIR	United States	
3X	JAC	Japan Air Commuter	COMMUTER	Japan	
	JSV	Japan Aircraft Service		Japan	
JL	JAL	Japan Airlines	JAPANAIR	Japan	Japan Airlines International
JL	JFL	Japan Airlines Domestic	J-BIRD	Japan	defunct
EG	JAA	Japan Asia Airways	ASIA	Japan	defunct
NU	JTA	Japan Transocean Air	JAI OCEAN	Japan	
JA	JAT	JetSmart	ROCKSMART	Chile	
JZ	JAP	JetSMART Perú	RED SMART	Peru	
WJ	JES	JetSMART Argentina	SMARTBIRD	Argentina	
JU	JAT	Jat Airways	JAT	Serbia	
VJ	JTY	Jatayu Airlines	JATAYU	Indonesia	
J9	JZR	Jazeera Airways	JAZEERA	Kuwait	
7C	JJA	Jeju Air	JEJU AIR	Republic of Korea	
	JNY	Jenney Beechcraft	JENAIR	United States	
	XLD	Jeppesen Data Plan		United States	
	JPN	Jeppesen UK	JETPLAN	United Kingdom	
O2	JEA	OLT Express	JETA	Poland	defunct, funded by acquisition of Jet Air and YES Airways
	JSI	Jet Air Group	SISTEMA	Russia	JSC
9W	JAI	Jet Airways	JET AIRWAYS	India	
QJ		Jet Airways		United States	
	JTX	Jet Aspen Air Lines	JET ASPEN	United States	
PP	PJS	Jet Aviation	JETAVIATION	Switzerland	
	BZF	Jet Aviation Business Jets	BIZFLEET	United States	
	JAS	Jet Aviation Flight Services	JET SETTER	United States	
	JCF	Jet Center Flight Training	JET CENTER	Spain	
	JCT	Jet Charter	JET CHARTER	United States	
	JCX	Jet Connection	JET CONNECT	Germany	defunct
	DWW	Jet Courier Service	DON JUAN	United States	
	JED	Jet East International	JET EAST	United States	defunct
	JEI	Jet Executive International Charter	JET EXECUTIVE	Germany	
	RZA	Jet Fighter Flights	RAZOR	Australia	
	CFT	Jet Freighters	CASPER FREIGHT	United States	
	JGD	Jet G&D Aviation	JET GEE-AND-DEE	Israel	
	MJL	Jet Line International	MOLDJET	Moldova	
	JEK	Jet Link	JET OPS	Israel	
	HTL	Jet Linx Aviation	HEARTLAND	United States	
	JTL	Jet Linx Aviation	JET LINX	United States	
	JNR	Jet Norte	JET NORTE	Mexico	
	JRN	Jet Rent	JET RENT	Mexico	
	JDI	Jet Story	JEDI	Poland	Formerly: Jet Service
3K	JSA	Jetstar Asia	JETSTAR ASIA	Singapore	
	JDI	Jet Story	JEDI	Poland	former Blue Jet
	JSM	Jet Stream	JET STREAM	Moldova	
	VTB	Jet Stream Charter KFT.	SUXAIR	Hungary	2023
	JSS	Jet Stream International		Pakistan	2023
	JTF	Jet Time	JETFIN	Finland	2014, 2023
	JTC	Jet Trans Aviation	JETRANS	Ghana	
	JTT	Jet-2000	MOSCOW JET	Russia	
	OPS	Jet-Ops	OPS-JET	United Arab Emirates	
	JSH	Jet-stream	STREAM AIR	Hungary	
LS	EXS	Jet2.com	CHANNEX	United Kingdom	Formerly Channel Express
	JFU	Jet4You	ARGAN	Morocco	
	OSW	JetAfrica Eswatini	BEVO	Swaziland	
B6	JBU	JetBlue Airways	JETBLUE	United States	
	JMG	JetMagic	JET MAGIC	Ireland	Defunct
	JMK	Jetmagic		Malta	Defunct, Not Many Flights
JF	JAA	Jet Asia Airways	JET ASIA	Thailand	
	JAF	Jetairfly	BEAUTY	Belgium	
	JTL	Jetall Holdings	FIREFLY	Canada	
	JAG	Jetalliance	JETALLIANCE	Austria	
0J	JCS	Jetclub	JETCLUB	Switzerland	
	QNZ	Jetconnect	QANTAS JETCONNECT	New Zealand	
	UEJ	Jetcorp	JETCORP	United States	(United Executive Jet)
	JCC	Jetcraft Aviation	JETCRAFT	Australia	
	JXA	Jetex Aviation		Lebanon	
	JEF	Jetflite	JETFLITE	Finland	
	JFL	Jetfly Airlines	LINEFLYER	Austria	
	JFA	Jetfly Aviation	MOSQUITO	Luxembourg	
	JIC	Jetgo International	JIC-JET	Thailand	
	JLX	Jetlink Express	KEN JET	Kenya	
	JLH	Jetlink Holland		Netherlands	Defunct, ICAO code in use by another company
	JNL	JetNetherlands	JETNETHERLANDS	Netherlands	
	JNV	Jetnova de Aviación Ejecutiva	JETNOVA	Spain	
	JPO	Jetpro	JETPRO	Mexico	
	MDJ	Jetran Air	JETRAN AIR	Romania	
	JRI	Jetrider International	JETRIDER	United Kingdom	
	JEJ	Jets Ejecutivos	MEXJETS	Mexico	
	JEP	Jets Personales	JET PERSONALES	Spain	
	JSE	Jets Y Servicios Ejecutivos	SERVIJETS	Mexico	
SG	JGO	JetsGo	JETSGO	Canada	defunct
JQ	JST	Jetstar	JETSTAR	Australia	
GK	JJP	Jetstar Japan	ORANGE LINER	Japan	
JM	JKT	Jetstar Hong Kong	KAITAK	China	
	JXT	Jetstream Executive Travel	VANNIN	United Kingdom	
	RSP	JetSuite	REDSTRIPE	United States	
	JPQ	Jett Paqueteria	JETT PAQUETERIA	Mexico	
JX	JEC	Jett8 Airlines Cargo	TAIPAN	Singapore	defunct
JO	JTD	Jettime	JETTIME	Denmark	
	JTN	Jet Test Intl.	JET TEST	United States	
	JWY	Jetways of Iowa	JETWAYS	United States	
GX	JXX	JetX Airlines	JETBIRD	Iceland	
	JIB	Jibair	JIBAIRLINE	Djibouti	
	JSW	Jigsaw Project	JIGSAW	United Kingdom	Bristow Helicopters
	HKN	Jim Hankins Air Service	HANKINS	United States	
	RAS	Jim Ratliff Air Service	SHANHIL	United States	
LJ	JNA	Jin Air	JIN AIR	South Korea	
	JDG	Joanas Avialinijos	LADYBLUE	Lithuania	
	JBR	Job Air	JOBAIR	Czech Republic	
	JHN	Johnson Air	AIR JOHNSON	United States	
	JON	Johnsons Air	JOHNSONSAIR	Ghana	
	JMJ	Johnston Airways	JOHNSTON	United States	
	JMM	Joint Military Commission	JOICOMAR	Sudan	
	JMT	Jomartaxi Aereo	JOMARTAXI	Mexico	
	ODI	Jonsson, H Air Taxi	ODINN	Iceland	
R5	JAV	Jordan Aviation	JORDAN AVIATION	Jordan	
J4	JCI	Jordan International Air Cargo		Jordan	
	JVK	Jorvik	ISLANDIC	Iceland	
	ENZ	Jota Aviation	ENZO	United Kingdom	
	JNJ	Journey Jet	JOURNEY JET	Thailand	
XE	JSX	JSX (airline)	BIGSTRIPE	United States	
	JUR	Ju-Air	JUNKERS	Switzerland	
	JFS	Juanda Flying School	JAEMCO	Indonesia	
	JUC	Juba Cargo Services & Aviation Company	JUBA CARGO	Sudan	
6J	JUB	Jubba Airways	JUBBA	Somalia	
	DKE	Jubilee Airways	DUKE	United Kingdom	
HO	DKH	Juneyao Airlines	AIR JUNEYAO	China	2023
	JSY	Jung Sky		Croatia	
	MEY	Justair Scandinavia	MELODY	Sweden	
	DOJ	Justice Prisoner Air Transportation System	JUSTICE	United States	
OH	JIA	PSA Airlines	BLUE STREAK	United States	

== IATA Traffic Conference Areas ==
The International Air Transport Association (IATA) divides the world into three areas called the Traffic Conference Areas (TCAs) for air travel purposes. These areas are used to define geographical boundaries for fare construction and other industry-related practices:

- Traffic Conference Area 1 (TC1) – this area includes the Americas, encompassing North America (the Caribbean, Central America, and Northern America) and South America.
- Traffic Conference Area 2 (TC2) – this area includes the EMEA region, encompassing Europe, the Middle East, and Africa (North Africa and Sub-Saharan Africa).
- Traffic Conference Area 3 (TC3) – this area includes the Asia–Pacific region, encompassing the rest of Asia (Central Asia, East Asia, North Asia, South Asia, and Southeast Asia) and Oceania.

Essentially, TC1 covers the "New World", while TC2 and TC3 together cover the "Old World" (Africa-Eurasia) and the "Land Down Under".

== See also ==
- IATA airport code
- ICAO airport code
