= List of VIP airlines of Russia =

A VIP airline is an airline which operates planes equipped in a luxurious manner (wood trim and paneling, for example), typically with drastically reduced seating numbers, partitioned sections (separated from each other) for privacy, seats facing each other with a table between. Seating tends to be larger so one seat per side where often there would be three (on a standard aircraft). Seating tends not to be in rows but in a more spacious lounge arrangement with no particular order. Such planes can often have televisions and telephones. VIP flights are all chartered and are typically used by VIP clients or businesses.

Name	IATA	ICAO	Callsign	Founded	Operating from	Details	Incidents	Fleet	Aircraft	Website
Aeroflot-Plus (Аэрофлот-Плюс)	P3	PLS	AEROPLUS	-	Sheremetyevo, Moscow	Aeroflot-Plus is Aeroflot's VIP passenger charter subsidiary, controlled by Austria's Jetalliance and based at Sheremetyevo Airport, Moscow.	-	3 X Tupolev Tu-134A-3 (RA-65559 frequently spotted), 2 X Yakovlev Yak-42D (RA-42365 frequently spotted)		-
Aero Business Service (ABS) (АЭРОБИЗНЕССЕРВИС)		LSM		1993	Vnukovo, Moscow	Aero Business Service is a ground-handling firm and charter VIP airline based at Vnukovo airport, Moscow. The airline specialises in the procurement of jets to carry out VIP flights, they themselves do not have any aircraft.	-	-		
AC Insat-Aero		IAE		-		AC-Insat Aero is a charter VIP airline based in Russia. The airline specialises in the procurement of jets to carry out VIP flights, they themselves do not have any aircraft.	-	-		
Aerotrans		CDU		-		Aerotrans is a charter VIP airline based in Russia. The airline specialises in the procurement of jets to carry out VIP flights, they themselves do not have any aircraft.	-	-		
Aerolimousine (Аэролимузин)		LIN	AEROLIMOUSINE	1998	Domodedovo International Airport, Moscow	LLC "Aerolimousine" (Russian: ООО «Аэролимузин») is an airline based in Russia. It operates VIP charter flights and air-taxi services	-	1 x Hawker 125-700 (RA-02810), 3 x Yakovlev Yak-40 (RA-87908, RA-87496, RA-87938)		
Alrosa-Avia (ЗАО Авиакомпания «АЛРОСА-АВИА»)		LRO	ALROSA	1992	Vnukovo, Moscow	The airline was established in 1992 as a derivative from Alrosa Mirny Air Enterprise and operates passenger charter services in Russia and the CIS	-	1 x Tupolev Tu-134-A (RA-65907), 1 x Tupolev Tu-134-B (RA-65693)		
Avia Business Group		AUP		-	-	Avia Business Group is a charter VIP airline based in Russia. The airline specialises in the procurement of jets to carry out VIP flights, they themselves do not have any aircraft.	-	-		
Bylina (Авиапредприятие «Былина»)		BYL	BYLINA	2003	Bykovo Airport	Russian executive private and business charter operator.	-	3 x Yakovlev Yak-40 (RA-87334, RA-88263, RA-21506)		
Jet-2000 (Авиакомпания «Джет-2000»)		JTT	MOSCOW JET	1999	Moscow, Russia	Jet-2000 Business Jets, established in 1999, is a business-aviation provider specialising in management of corporate and private aircraft in Russia and other countries of the post-Soviet area. The company holds a Russian Air Operator Certificate. Services include on-demand executive charter; management of corporate and private aircraft; aircraft acquisition and sales; aviation-related consulting and audit; and private & charter Services	-	Dassault Falcon 2000EX EASy, Bombardier Challenger 604, Hawker 4000, Hawker 850XP, Hawker 750, Antonov AN-74D (refurbished)		
Jet air group (Джет Эйр Групп)		JSI	SISTEMA		Moscow, Russia	VIP charter airline	-	Tupolev Tu-134, BAe 125		
Sirius-Aero (Авиакомпания «Сириус-Аэро»)		CIG	SIRIUS AERO	-	Shturmanskaya, Russia	Sirius-Aero is a Russian airline, based in Shturmanskaya, Russia, which organises business and medical charter flights both on their own aircraft and on that of partner charter airlines	-	1 x BAE-125-700 (RA-02803), 1 x BAE-125-800 (RA-02806), 3 x Tupolev TU-134A-3 (RA-65722, RA-65604, RA-65978)		
Ural VIP Avia (Урал-VIP-Авиа)		URV		2002	Moscow, Russia	VIP, wedding and corporate charter airline/broker based in Moscow, Russia which facilitates the charter of numerous aircraft types for business use as well as for/to sporting events. Ural VIP Avia also provides an air-taxi service and facilitates the air transfer of patients. The airline does not own its own aircraft, it procures aircraft from other charter airlines.	-	-		

== See also ==
- List of airlines
- List of airports in Russia
- List of small airlines and helicopter airlines of Russia
- List of airlines of Russia
