= JTX =

JTX can refer to:

- J. T. Harding, an American country music songwriter who released music under the stage name "JTX"
- Jackson Hewitt, an American tax-preparation company, formerly with the stock ticker "JTX"
- Jet Aspen Air Lines, an American airline, by ICAO code; see List of airline codes (J)
