= GX =

GX, Gx, or gx may refer to:

== Airlines ==
- Guangxi Beibu Gulf Airlines (IATA airline designator GX)
- Air Ontario (1983-2001, former IATA airline designator GX)
- JetMagic (2003-2004, former IATA airline designator GX)

== Arts, entertainment, and media ==
- GX (gaming expo), a non-gambling game convention in Toronto, Ontario, Canada
- GX Jupitter-Larsen, an American artist and writer
- F-Zero GX, a racing video game for the Nintendo GameCube console
- Pokémon-GX, a part of the Pokémon Trading Card Game
- Symphogear GX, the third season of Symphogear, an anime series
- Yu-Gi-Oh! GX, an anime series

== Vehicles ==
- GX (rocket), a Japanese launch vehicle
- Buick Encore GX, a 2019–present American subcompact SUV
- Buick Excelle GX, the station wagon variant of the 2015–present Buick Excelle GT Chinese compact sedan
- Chery Arrizo GX, a 2018–present Chinese compact sedan
- Lexus GX, a 2002–present Japanese full-size SUV

== Other uses ==
- Ĝ, sometimes written as Gx or gx, a letter in the Esperanto alphabet
- Gx, in mobile telephony, the on-line policy interface in the GPRS core network
- GX, a conservation rank meaning "globally presumed extinct" in the NatureServe conservation status system
- Gerrards Cross, a town in Buckinghamshire, England
- Global Xpress, a satellite communication system
- Guangxi, an autonomous region of China (Guobiao abbreviation GX)
- Opera GX, a "gaming" browser from Opera Software
- gx, an abbreviation for grex (horticulture), used to describe hybrids of orchids
- GX, the National Rail operator code for Gatwick Express on UK Railways
