= FJX =

FJX may refer to:

- FJX, an electric-acoustic guitar Yamaha Corporation product
- FJX, Royal Air Force squadron code for the Central Gunnery School RAF unit
- FJX, ICAO airline code for Jet Sky Cargo and Air Charter
- FJX, 1988 regional jet by Short Brothers
