= JTT =

JTT may refer to:

- Japan Turbine Technologies
- Jet-2000, a Russian airline
- Jonathan Taylor Thomas (born 1981), American actor
- JT Tuimoloau, American football player
