= VTB (disambiguation) =

VTB Bank is a Russian majority state-owned bank.

VTB may also refer to:

- VTB Arena, a planned stadium in Moscow
- VTB Capital, a branch of VTB Group
- VTB Ice Palace, Moscow, a sports venue
- VTB United League, a basketball league
- Vermont Teddy Bear Company, retailer in the United States
- Vitebsk Vostochny Airport (IATA: VTB), Belarus
- Jet Stream Charter KFT. (ICAO code: VTB), a Hungarian airline
