= Wingo xprs =

Finnish virtual airline

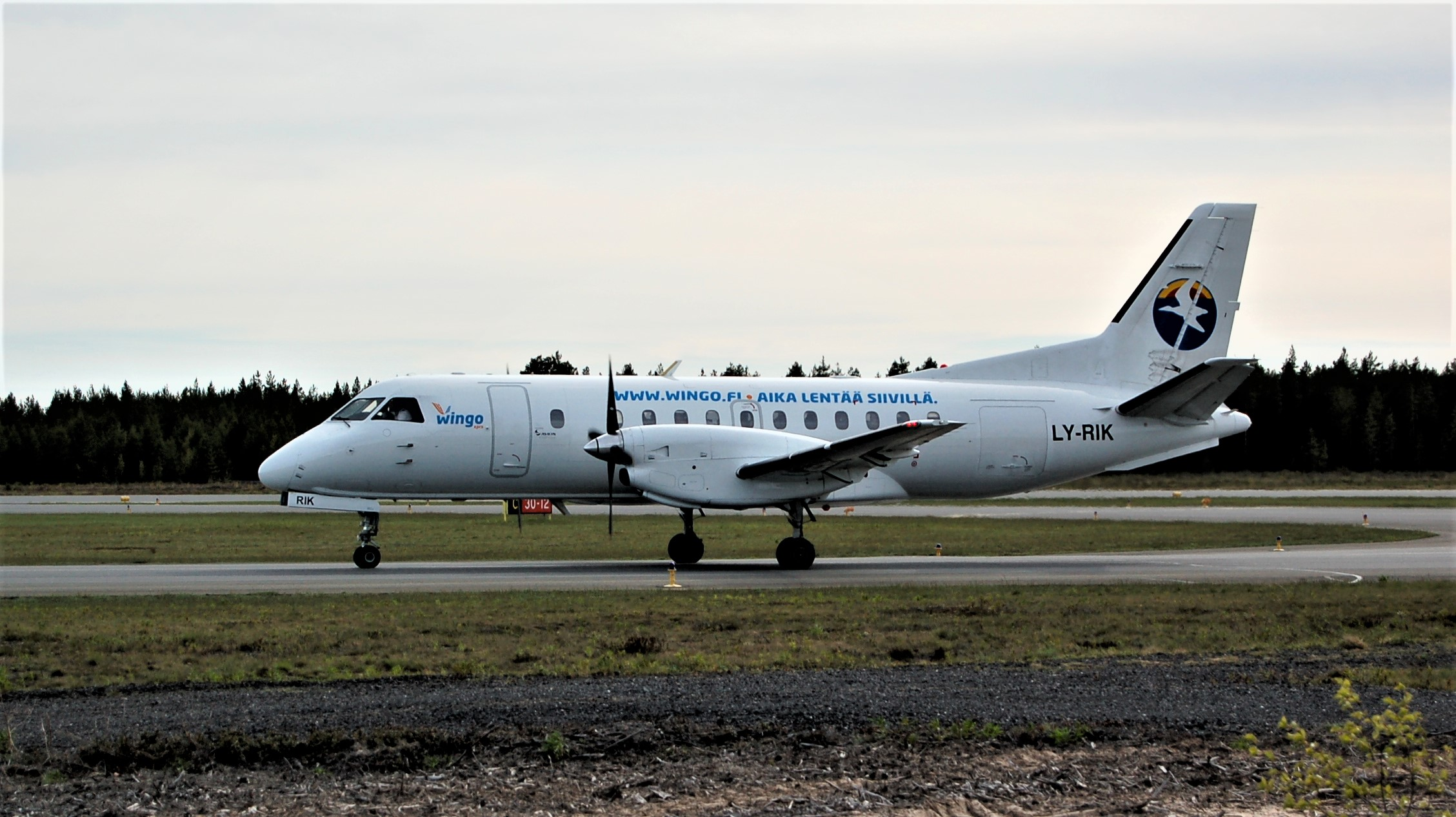
- Saab 340
IATA	ICAO	Call sign
–	–	–
- Founded: 2007
- Ceased operations: 2010
- Fleet size: 1
- Destinations: 6
- Headquarters: Turku, Finland
- Key people: Holger Holm (CEO)
- Website: www.wingoxprs.com

Wingo xprs was a small airline in Finland which was founded in 2007 in Tampere. The air carrier had no planes or staff of its own but leased them instead. Using just one aircraft Wingo xprs flew to three destinations: Turku via Tampere to Oulu. In 2008, the airline recorded 18,000 passengers. According to Finnish newspaper Turun Sanomat, the new shareholders approved transfer of headquarters from Tampere to Turku. The initial Saab 340, leased by Avitrans Nordic, was replaced by ATR-42s, always strictly rented. The new chief executive officer was Holger Holm. In 2010, the airline ceased all operations.

== Fleet ==
The Wingo xprs fleet included the following aircraft (as of 28 April 2010):

Wingo xprs fleet
Aircraft	Total	Orders	Passengers (Economy)	Notes
ATR 42-300	1	0	46	operated by Jet Air
Total	1	0		
