= Amber Gold (company) =

Polish financial company perpetrating a Ponzi scheme

Amber Gold Sp. z o.o.
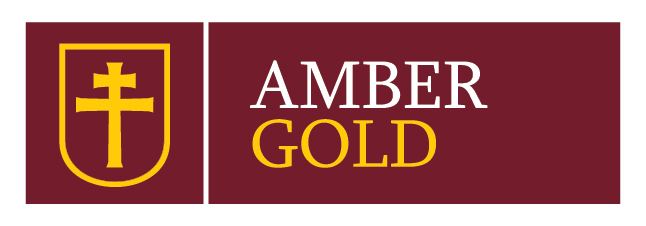
- Founded: January 27, 2009; 17 years ago
- Founder: Marcin Plichta
- Defunct: September 12, 2012; 13 years ago
- Fate: Bankruptcy and liquidation
- Headquarters: Gdańsk, Poland
- Subsidiaries: OLT Express
- Website: ambergold.com.pl

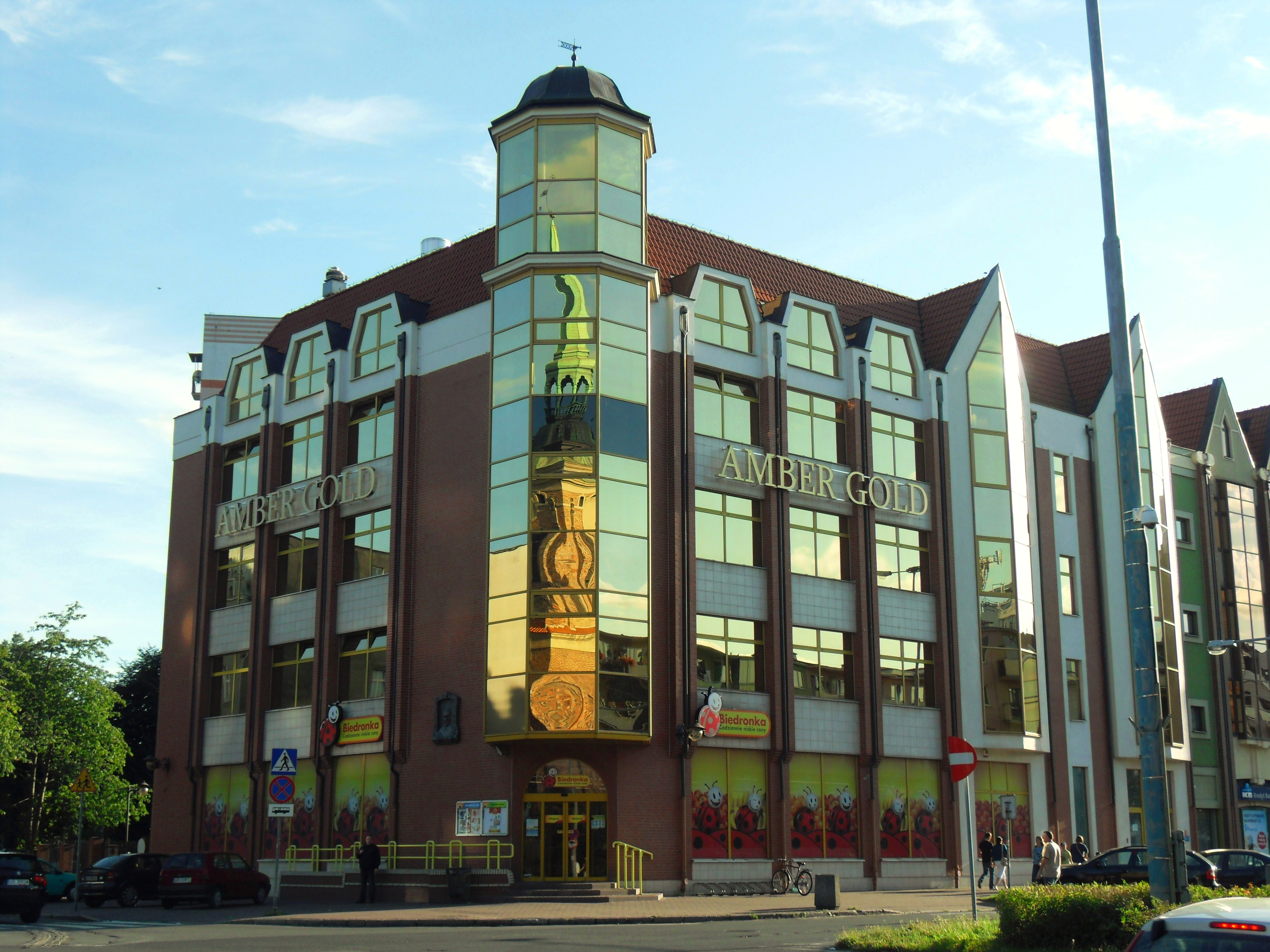
Amber Gold headquarters in Gdańsk

Amber Gold was a Polish financial institution founded on 27 January 2009 by Marcin Plichta and liquidated on 20 September 2012. It was a Ponzi scheme. In 2014, the District Prosecutor's Office in Łódź estimated the losses caused by its illicit activities at almost 851 million złoty.

== History ==
Amber Gold was founded in Gdańsk by Marcin Plichta, known until 2008 as Marcin Stefański. Between 2005 and 2009 Plichta was sentenced several times for fraud by Polish courts, but each sentence was conditionally suspended.

On 27 January 2009 the company was registered by the Regional Court of Gdańsk-Północ as Grupa Inwestycyjna Ex Sp. z o.o. On 27 July 2009 the company changed its name to Amber Gold Sp. z o.o. Claiming to be the first Polish warehouse to store noble metals, it offered its clients controversial investments in gold and other bullion.

Since December 2009 the Polish Financial Supervision Authority (Komisja Nadzoru Finansowego, KNF) had been warning that Amber Gold did not have its consent to perform banking activities and accept cash contributions in order to burden them with risk. In March 2012, the victims of Warszawska Grupa Inwestycyjna, another company operating on the basis of a Ponzi scheme, unsuccessfully warned the government and other institutions against Amber Gold and requested changes in the law to prevent the development of Ponzi schemes.

On 2 July 2012, the Internal Security Agency began an investigation regarding Amber Gold misleading its customers as to the security of their investments, as well as suspicion of money laundering by the company. On 13 August 2012, the company decided to go into liquidation, close its branches, and terminate all deposit agreements with its customers.

A number of charges had been brought against Plichta, including attestations of untruth, failure to submit the company's financial statements, performing unregistered currency exchange and bank activities. In addition, the tax offices and courts of Gdańsk were charged with unfulfilment of duties. Disciplinary proceedings were also initiated against the prosecutor who accepted Plichta's request for voluntary submission to penalty in earlier cases, though they were later discontinued. In 2013, the National Bank of Poland's Financial Stability Committee published a report in which it noted that the extortion of money from over 11,000 people committed by Amber Gold was possible, among other things, due to omissions on the part of public institutions, pointing mainly to the Regional Prosecutor's Office of Gdańsk-Wrzeszcz, the Office of Competition and Customer Protection, the Central Investigation Bureau, the Internal Security Agency, and some banks that cooperated with the company.

On 16 October 2019 the District Court of Gdańsk sentenced Marcin Plichta to a total sentence of 15 years in prison and a fine of PLN 159,000. His wife, Katarzyna Plichta, was sentenced to 12 years and 6 months in prison and a fine of PLN 135,000.
