= Fly Lappeenranta =

Finnish regional airline (2008–2010)

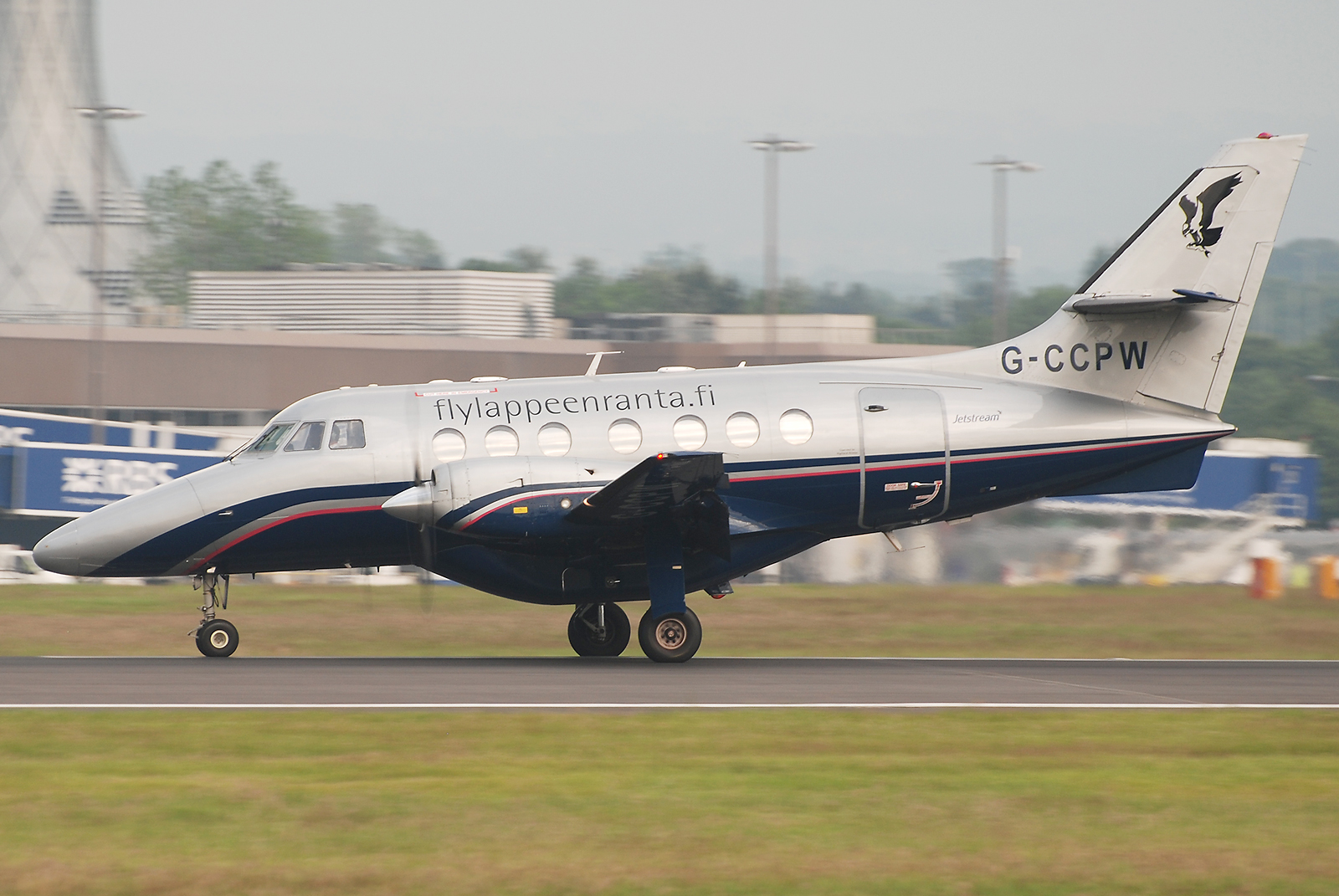
- Jetstream 31
IATA	ICAO	Call sign
8H	HWY	HIGHWAY
- Founded: 2008
- Ceased operations: 2010
- Hubs: Lappeenranta Airport
- Fleet size: 2
- Destinations: 2
- Headquarters: Lappeenranta, Finland
- Key people: Juha-Pekka Paananen (Managing Director)
- Website: www.flylappeenranta.fi (defunct)

Fly Lappeenranta Oy was a regional airline with headquarters at Lappeenranta Airport in Lappeenranta, Finland. It was established in 2008 and operated daily flights between Lappeenranta and Helsinki using at the beginning a fleet of two Saab 340 and, from 2009, of Jetstream 31. They were leased from Central Connect Airlines and Highland Airways, respectively. All operations were stopped in 2010.
