= Barkol Airlines =

Russian charter airline

| IATA | ICAO | Call sign |
|---|---|---|
| — | BKL | Barkol |
- Founded: 1996
- Hubs: Moscow (Vnukovo, Ostafyevo, Bykovo) • Khabarovsk (Novy) • Yaroslavl (Tunoshna) • Leningrad Region (Nevskaya) • Velikie Luki (Khvoinaya) • Saratov (Dubki) • Lipetsk • Samara (Smyshliaevka) • Penza (Ternovka) • Volgograd (Gumrak) • Briansk • Ryazan (Listvianka) • Tyumen (Roshchino) • Tobolsk • Tyumen Region (Ishim) • Dalnerechensk
- Fleet size: 51
- Destinations: N/A - Charter
- Headquarters: Moscow
- Key people: Barkhotov Viktor Sergeevich (Director General)
- Website: barkol.ru

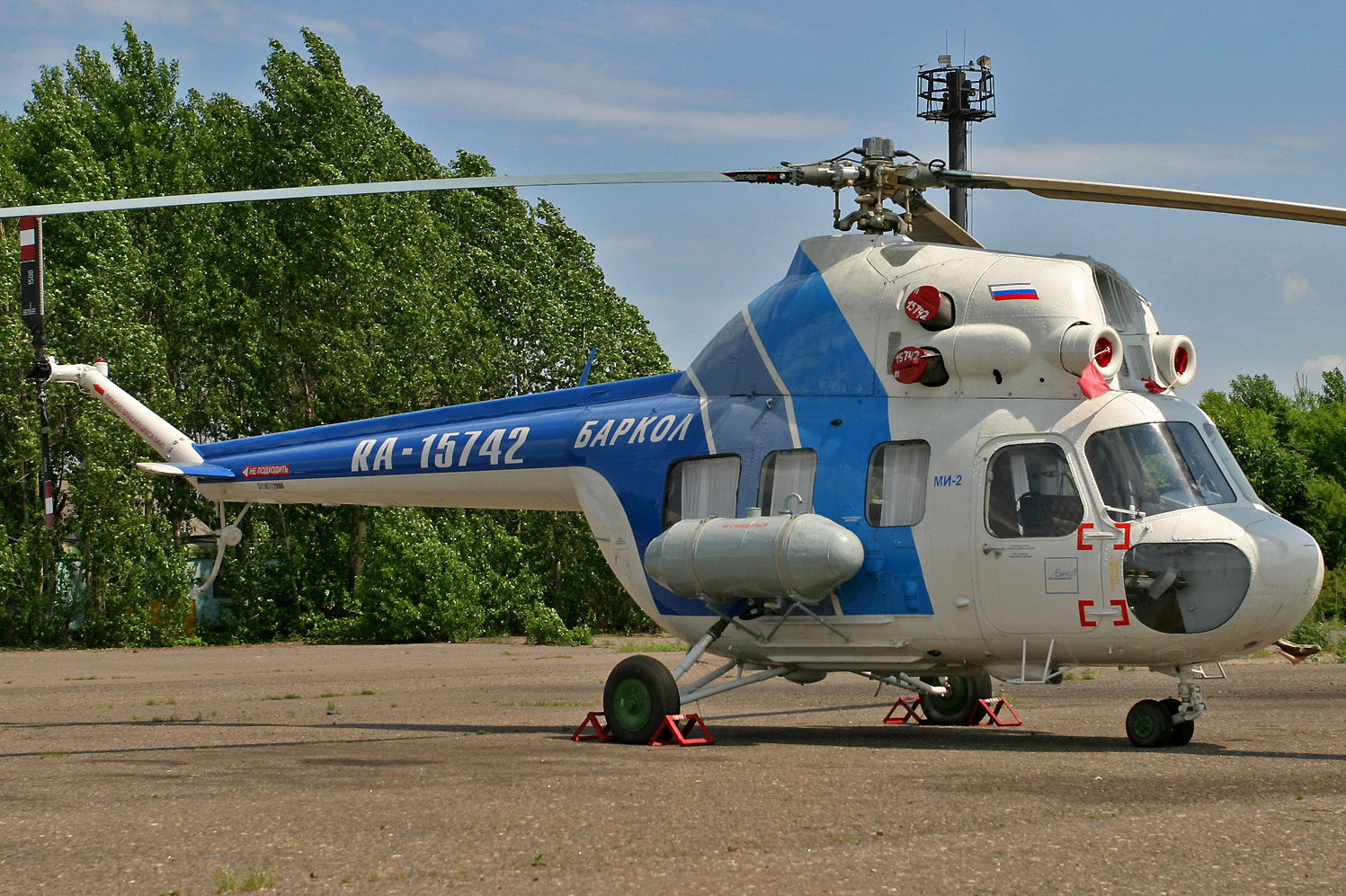
Mil Mi-2

Barkol Airlines is a large Russian charter airline based in Moscow that carries out VIP charter flights (both on its own aircraft and on those leased from other airlines) as well as patrols of power, gas and oil lines, forest patrols, aerial photography and crop spraying (on its Antonov An-2, Mil Mi-2 and Mil Mi-8 aircraft).

It is currently banned from flying into European Union airspace.

== Finances ==
Year-on-year, net operating revenues increased by 15.46%, from RUB 1,098,632,000 to RUB 1,268,526,000 from 2009 to 2010. Operating result decreased, by 20.18% from RUB 45,427,000 to RUB 36,261,000.

== Region served ==
Western (European) Russia is served up to the area bordered to the east by Khanty-Mansiysk and Salekhard.

== Fleet ==
Aircraft type
| Yakovlev Yak-40 | 4 | RA-87957, RA-87280, RA-88228, RA-88229 |
| Mil Mi-8 | 14 | |
| Robinson R-44 | 21 | Includes RA-04242 |
| Cessna 172S | 2 | |
| An-2 | 7 | |
| Mi-2 | 3 | |
