= OLT Express Germany =

German regional airline

Coordinates: 53.38893°N 7.22852°E

IATA	ICAO	Call sign
S2	OLT	OLTRA
- Founded: 1958 (as Ostfriesische Lufttaxi)
- Ceased operations: 30 January 2013
- Hubs: Bremen Airport; Saarbrücken Airport
- Fleet size: 15
- Destinations: 10
- Parent company: Panta Holdings
- Headquarters: Bremen, Germany
- Key people: Joachim Klein (CEO)
- Website: oltexpress.de

OLT Express Germany (formerly OLT Ostfriesische Lufttransport GmbH or OLT) was an airline based in Bremen in Germany. The company moved to Bremen from Emden in February 2012. It operated regional scheduled and charter flights linking northern Germany to other parts of the country and Bremen to other European destinations. Its main base was Bremen Airport.

== History ==
=== Founding and first years ===
OLT was founded on 1 November 1958 by Martin Dekker and Jan Janssen as Ostfriesische Lufttaxi - Dekker und Janssen OHG, initially operating air taxi flights to islands in the North Sea from Emden. The first aircraft was a KZ VII from Skandinavisk Aero Industri A/S in Copenhagen. In 1961 the airline hired its first own staff: a pilot and a 'groundstewardess'.

OLT had, by 1968, five aircraft and operated 13,174 flights. After Janssen's death the company AGIV (Aktiengesellschaft für Verkehrswesen) and the shipping company Reederei Visser & van Doornums became 1970 new shareholders and the airlines was renamed into Ostfriesische Lufttaxi GmbH. A schedule service from Emden to Bremen and Hamburg was introduced then. Soon later AGIV became the single shareholder of OLT and positioned the new CEO Christian Ulrich Baron von Kaltenborn-Stachau.

=== 39 Years of operation as OLT - Ostfriesische Lufttransport ===
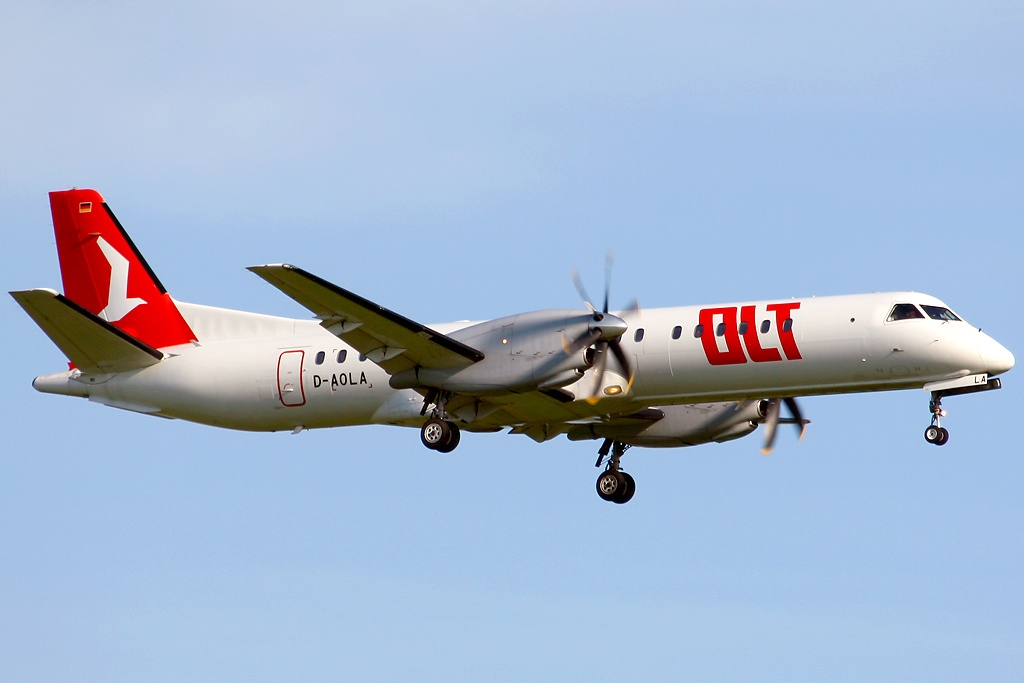
A Saab 2000 of OLT - Ostfriesische Lufttransport

In 1972 the airlines was renamed again, now into Ostfriesische Lufttransport GmbH (OLT) and Kaltenborn-Stachau took over 26%. Several new schedule services were introduced like from Kassel, Düsseldorf to Cologne/Bonn in 1973 and Hanover, Saarbrücken, Stuttgart, Münster/Osnabrück and Frankfurt in 1974. For the regional airlines business strategy the company DLT (Deutsche Lufttransport-Gesellschaft mbH) was created and OLT was renamed into DLT Luftverkehrsgesellschaft. But soon later AGIV decided to split the Emden (OLT) operation away from DLT. This unit (Emden operation) was sold then to AG EMS and OLT restart its old core activities under its own name. To ensure a flexible operation, especially in the charter sector, OLT organised 1976 a joint platform called OFD with the participating airlines OLT, FLN and Dollart GmbH.

At the beginning 1990s, with the fall of the Berlin Wall, the airlines faced an increase of their business activities. OLT started operations in the former East German provinces and 1990 took over Roland Air from Bremen. In 1991 OLT set up a base in Bremen and started with its scheduled services there. In 1996 all OFD activities were integrated into OLT and therefore under the control of AG EMS.

OLT is one of very few airlines that has succeeded in driving a low-cost rival off a route. In December 2005, easyJet started daily flights between Bristol and its base in Hamburg. OLT was operating twice-daily weekday-only services. The route being a predominantly business route, frequency won out over price and easyJet cancelled the route at the end of October 2006.

=== OLT Express Germany ===
OLT announced on 4 August 2011 it would undergo major restructuring after losing its shuttle flights contract with Airbus Industries. Effective October 2011 all Fokker and Saab aircraft operations would stop and 100 of its 120 employees were to leave the company. Only the 'island-hopping' services from Emden to Heligoland and Borkum with small aircraft were to remain. In August 2011, OLT was bought by a Polish shadow banking Ponzi scheme company Amber Gold, which also bought Polish regional carrier Jet Air and the Polish charter airline Yes Airways. These two Polish companies were combined under the brand OLT Express while OLT became OLT Express Germany. The island flights were taken over by a new independent company, OFD Ostfriesischer-Flug-Dienst.

OLT Express Germany completed the purchase of Contact Air in September 2012. The purchase included Contact Air's wet-lease contract to operate two aircraft on behalf of Swiss International Air Lines. The same week as the Contact Air purchase Amber Gold was reported to be experiencing financial difficulty and funding for the deal was in question. On 27 July, the Polish OLT Express suspended all services without notice.

In August 2012 Dutch company Panta Holdings announced it was buying OLT Germany from Amber Gold and also finalised the purchase of Contact Air. Panta also owns Denim Air and Maas Air Leasing. Both subsidiaries own Fokker aircraft and Maas leased out two Fokker 100 to Contact Air. In December 2012 it was announced that the wet-lease contract with Swiss International Air Lines would not be renewed and was scheduled to conclude in March 2013.

OLT Express Germany ceased all operations on 27 January 2013 due to financial difficulties. The company filed for bankruptcy two days later.

== Destinations ==
OLT operated the following services (as of January 2013). Note that all island flights had been transferred to the independent company OFD Ostfriesischer-Flug-Dienst back in 2011.

=== Operated as OLT Express Germany ===
- Austria
  - Vienna - Vienna International Airport seasonal
- Denmark
  - Copenhagen - Copenhagen Airport
- France
  - Toulouse - Toulouse-Blagnac Airport
- Germany
  - Bremen - Bremen Airport Hub
  - Dresden - Dresden Airport
  - Hamburg - Hamburg Airport
  - Karlsruhe - Baden Airpark
  - Münster - Münster Osnabrück Airport
  - Munich - Munich Airport
  - Saarbrücken - Saarbrücken Airport Hub
- Switzerland
  - Zürich - Zurich Airport
- United Kingdom
  - London - London Southend Airport

=== Operated for Swiss International Air Lines ===
- Germany
  - Stuttgart - Stuttgart Airport
  - Munich - Munich Airport
- Hungary
  - Budapest - Budapest Ferenc Liszt International Airport
- Poland
  - Warsaw - Warsaw Chopin Airport
- Serbia
  - Belgrade - Belgrade Nikola Tesla Airport
- Switzerland
  - Zürich - Zurich Airport Base

== Fleet ==
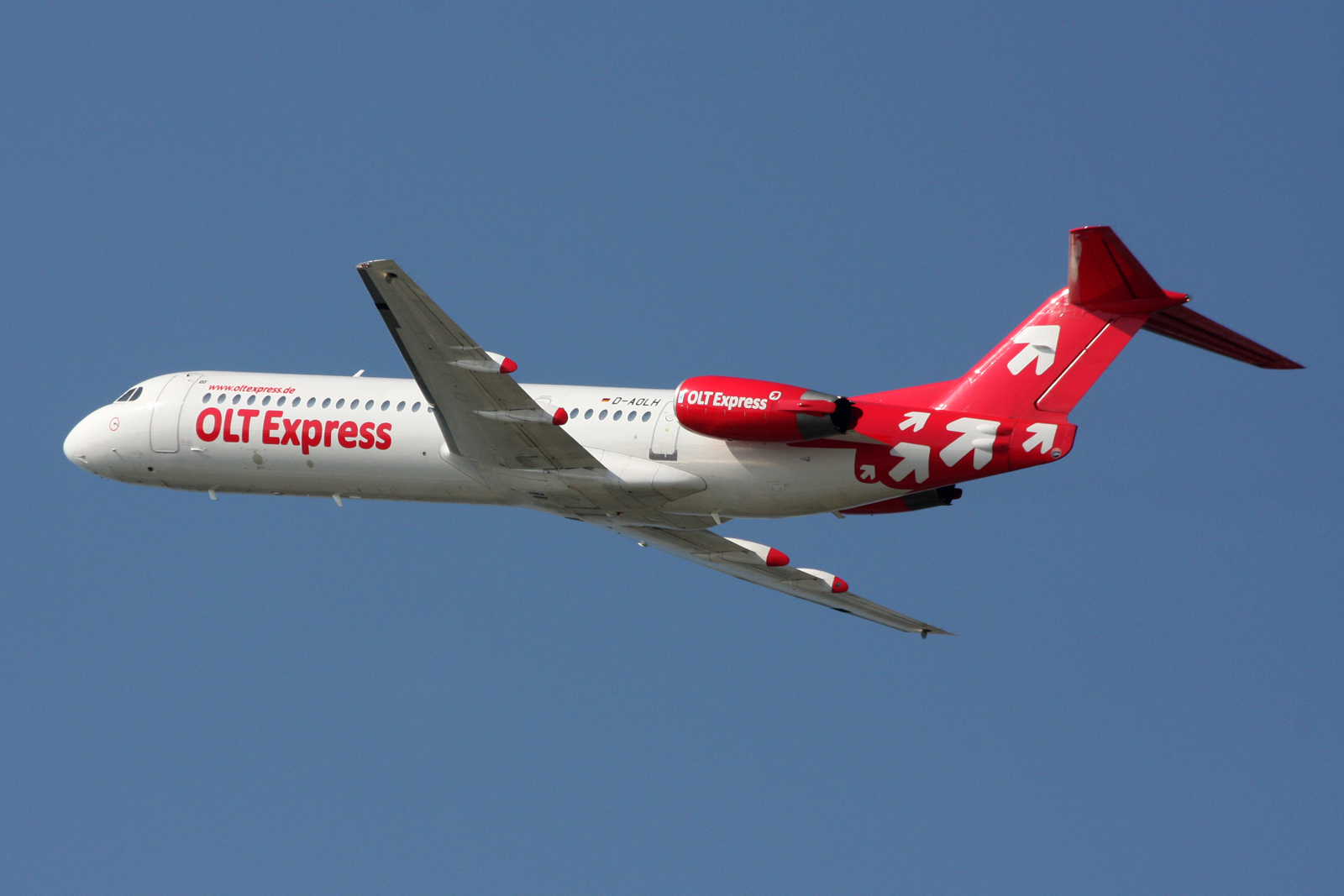
OLT Express Germany Fokker 100

As of January 2013, the OLT Express Germany fleet consisted of the following aircraft:

Aircraft	Total	Orders	Passengers	Notes
Fokker 100	10	—	100	
Saab 2000	4	—	56	
Saab 340	1	—	37	
Total	15	—		
