= Centre-Avia =

Russian airline

Centre-Avia Airlines
IATA	ICAO	Call sign
J7	CVC	AVIACENTRE
- Founded: 2000
- Ceased operations: 2010
- Hubs: Bykovo Airport
- Fleet size: 4
- Parent company: Centre-Avia Airlines Joint Stock Company
- Headquarters: Moscow, Russia
- Website: centreavia.ru

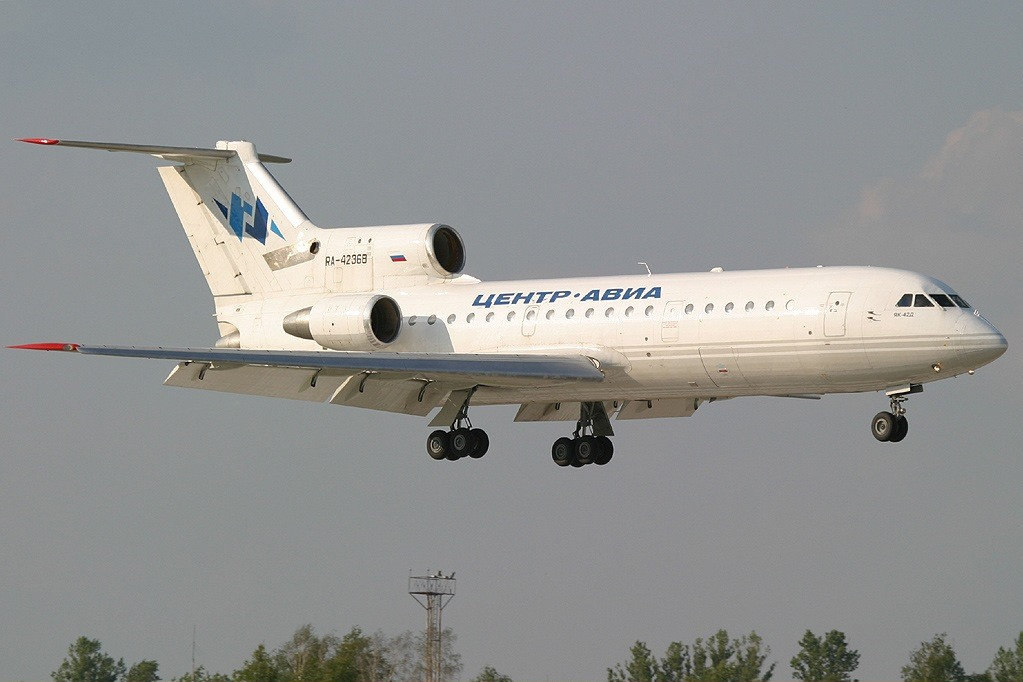
Centre-Avia Yakovlev Yak-42, Moscow, 2004

Centre-Avia Airlines (Авиакомпания "ЦЕНТР-АВИА") was an airline based in Moscow, Russia, operating domestic and international services. Its main base was Bykovo Airport, Moscow, from where it operated charter flights, plus, on working days, a scheduled flight from Moscow Domodedovo Airport to Nizhny Novgorod International Airport. In March 2007, the aircraft fleet of Centre-Avia consisted of four Yakovlev Yak-42.

== History ==
Centre-Avia was founded in 2000 and was owned by Bykovo Aircraft Repair Plant (29.4%), Bykovo Airport (20%), MRIK Investment (20%) and Resourcetrustbank (10.8%). In 2010, the company was liquidated.
