= Smolenskaerotrans =

Russian airline

Smolenskaerotrans (Смоленскаэротранс)
- Founded: November 6th, 1997
- Hubs: Tikhvinka (Airport), Smolensk
- Fleet size: 5
- Headquarters: Smolensk
- Key people: Andrey Kalugin (CEO)

Smolenskaerotrans was a charter airline based in Smolensk, Russia. It specialised in aerial work and also carried cargo.

== Fleet ==
Aircraft type	Active	Notes
Mil Mi-2	4	
LET L-410 UVP	1	
