= Zonalnoye Air Enterprise =

Zonalnoye Air Enterprise (Авиапредприятие «Зональное»)
IATA	ICAO	Call sign
—	DF	—
- Founded: January 20, 1992
- Ceased operations: 2017
- Headquarters: Tymovskoye, Sakhalin Oblast, Russia

Zonalnoye (Russian: Авиапредприятие Зональное, Aviapredprijatije Zonaljnoje) was founded on January 20, 1992 and is an airline based in Tymovskoye (Sakhalin Oblast) of Russia which specialises in the transportation and storage of petroleum and related equipment. Zonalnoye also engages in the wholesale of fuel

== Fleet ==
Aircraft	In fleet	Seats	Notes
Antonov An-2	5	12	(RA-17819, RA-40759, RA-32553, RA-82837, RA-96255)
Mil Mi-2	2	7	(RA-14088 and RA-20305)

== Criminal liability ==
On 26 March 2012, the head of Zonalnoye was subject to criminal liability (by Yegor Korczak, the Sakhalin transport prosecutor) for regularly carrying passengers in an Mi-2 helicopter in 2011 without a passenger license. The company made 75 passenger flights in that year, carrying 1007 passengers on the routes:

- Alexandrovsk-Sakhalinsky - Trambaus - Viahtu - Alexandrovsk-Sakhalinsky
- Okha - Rybnovskij - Okha

The airline was also fined 40,000 Roubles.
