= Northwest Air Base =

Airline in Karelia, Russia

NW Avia
- Founded: 2007 (company dates back to 1974)
- Ceased operations: 2014
- Hubs: Petrozavodsk, Republic of Karelia
- Fleet size: 13, 4 active
- Destinations: 2
- Headquarters: Petrozavodsk, Republic of Karelia

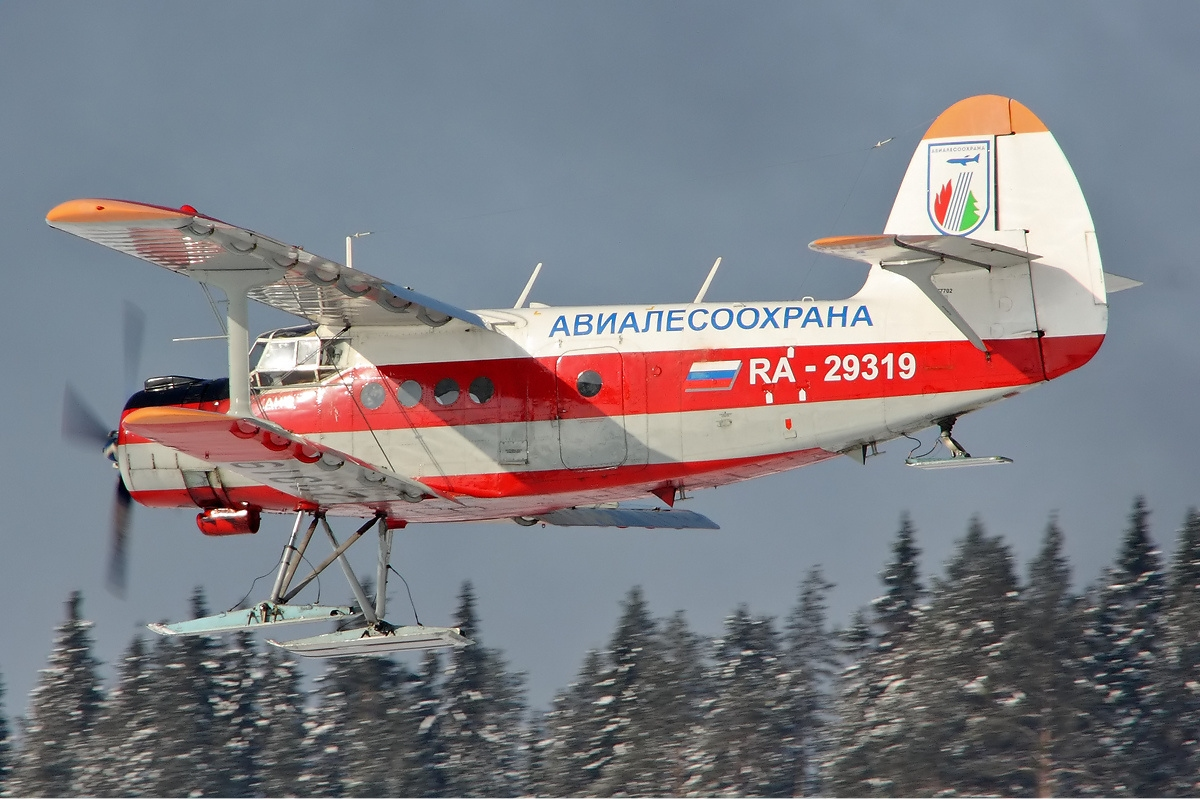
Antonov An-2

NW Avia was an airline based at Peski (airport) in Petrozavodsk. It was the only air company in the Republic of Karelia. Its main purpose was aerial fire-fighting (for which it was licensed) It was part of Avialesookhrana, although it did perform other typical aerial services (including pipeline and forest patrols, medical flights and search-and-rescue, scheduled and charter passenger flights. (commenced in 2009) and charter cargo services. NW Avia was undergoing reorganization with massive debts (~10 million rubles, it peaked at ~22 million rubles) and was the largest debtor in the Republic of Karelia. The airlines ceased to exist on July 1, 2014.

== Destinations ==
Petrozavodsk, Kizhi

== Fleet ==
| Aircraft type | Active | Notes |
|---|---|---|
| Antonov An-2 | 8 | 2 usable as of 2010, down from 4 at the end of 2009 |
| Mil Mi-8 | 5 | 2 in usable as of 2010, down from 3 at the end of 2009 |
