= Dubki =

Dubki may refer to:

== Places ==
- Dubki, Republic of Dagestan, an urban-type settlement in the Republic of Dagestan, Russia
- Dubki, Pechorsky District, Pskov Oblast, an exclave with no land connection with mainland Russia
- Dubki, Bezhanitsky District, Pskov Oblast
- Dubki, Ostrovsky District, Pskov Oblast
- Dubki, Pskovsky District, Pskov Oblast

== Other uses ==
- Dubki (drum)
- Dubki (crater), a crater on Mars
