= OLT Express =

Polish charter airline

IATA	ICAO	Call sign
—	YAP/JEA	WHITEKEKO/JETAIR
- Founded: 2009 (as Yes Airways)
- Ceased operations: 31 July 2012
- AOC #: PL-004/11
- Hubs: Warsaw Chopin Airport; Gdańsk Lech Wałęsa Airport
- Fleet size: 13
- Parent company: Amber Gold (company)
- Headquarters: Gdańsk/Warsaw, Poland
- Key people: Jarosław Frankowski (CEO)
- Website: www.oltexpress.com

OLT Express Poland (ICOA: YAP) was a Polish charter airline, formally known as Yes Airways. On 31 July 2012 it suspended all charter services, less than a week after the scheduled sister airline OLT Express Regional cancelled all its services. Stranded customers were returned home on LOT services. All leased aircraft were repossessed by lessors, and even some wet lease pilots were released back to their employer airlines. Its sister airline, OLT Express Regional (ICOA: JEA), filed for bankruptcy on 27 July 2012 after its licence was suspended by the Polish Aviation Authority.

Yes Airways was founded in 2009 and was based in Warsaw. It began operations in late April 2011. It flew from regional airports in Poland on behalf of tour operators and was the first Polish airline to have Airbus aircraft in its fleet. In early 2012, YES Airlines was rebranded as OLT Express Poland by its new owners, Amber Gold, who also controlled OLT Express Germany and OLT Express Regional. The airline's main hub was located at Warsaw Chopin Airport.

On 31 July 2012 OLT Express Poland followed its sister airline OLT Express Regional in suspending all services. All leased aircraft were returned to their owners. The third sister company, OLT Express Germany, announced they are seeking an external investor to support operations, and fund the earlier announced takeover of Contact Air.

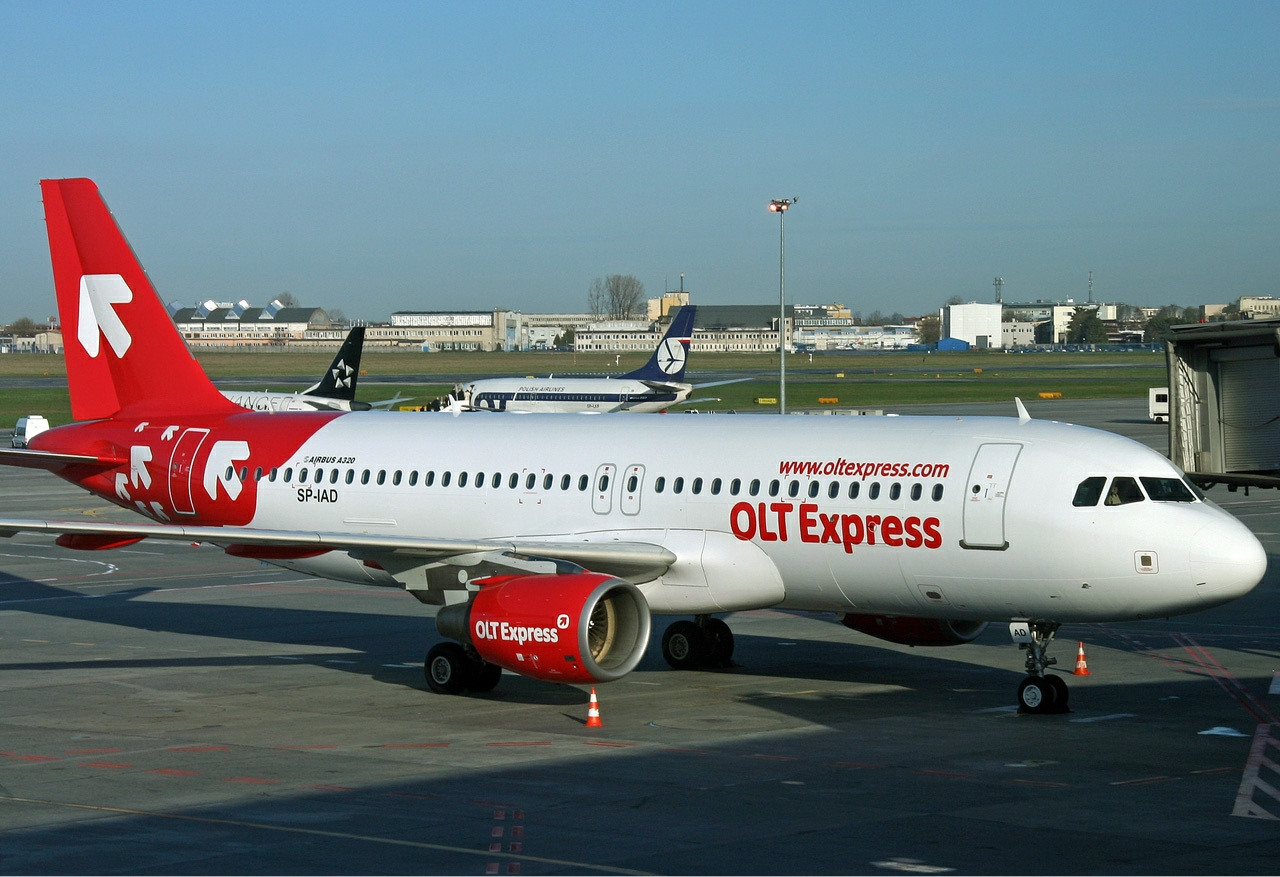
OLT Express Airbus A320 at Warsaw Chopin Airport

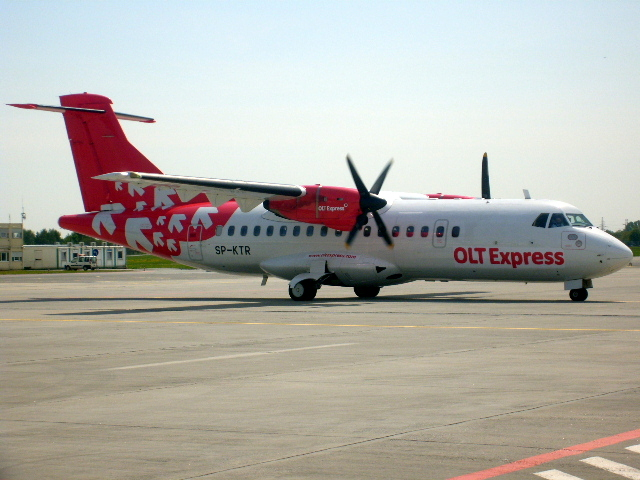
An OLT Express ATR 42

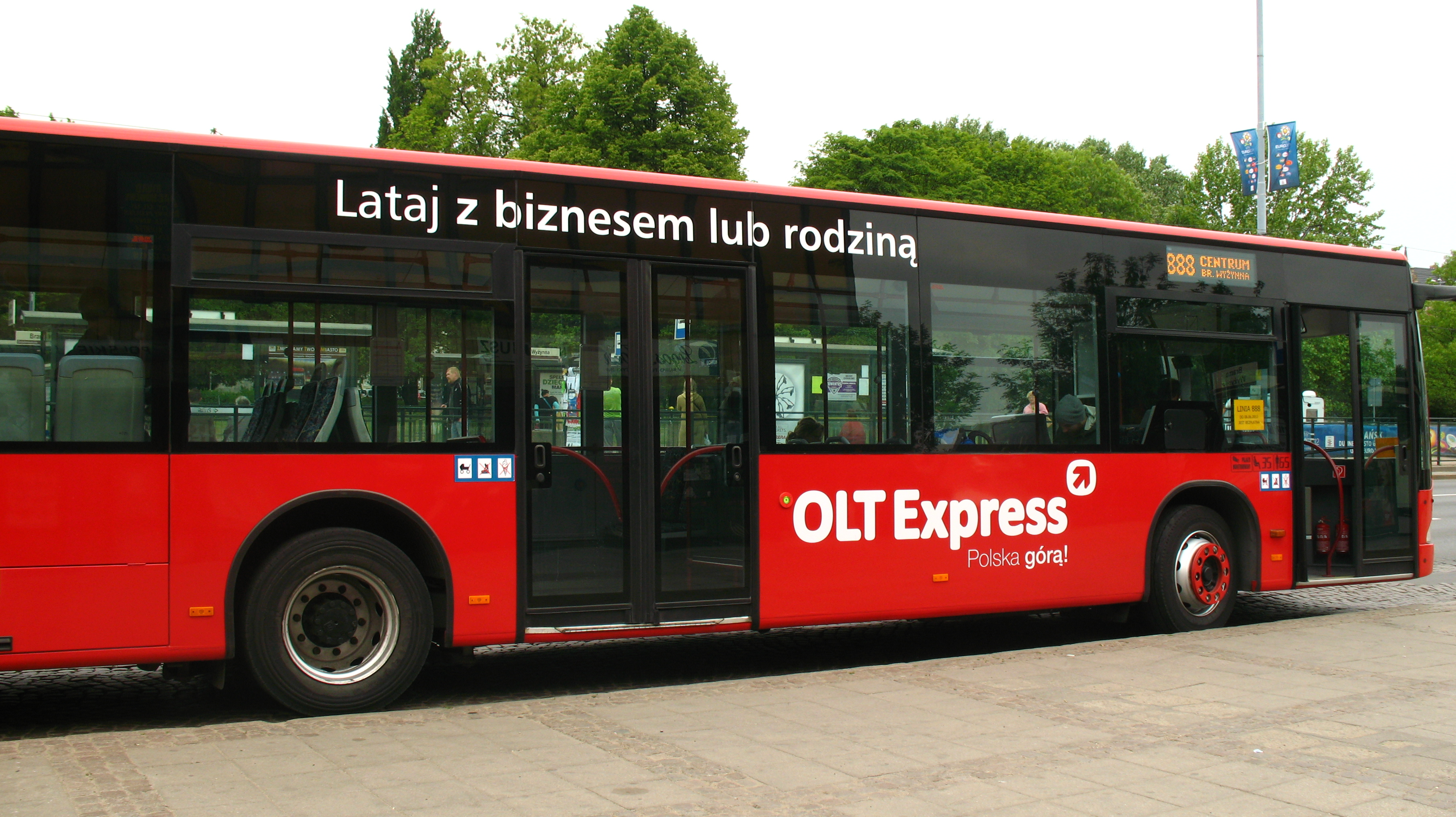
OLT Express bus line from Gdańsk Lech Wałęsa Airport to the city center

== OLT Express Regional - Scheduled services ==
OLT Express Regional began life in 2001 as Jet Air, an airline operating in the business aviation sector, providing broker rendering services (small aircraft and helicopters) to local operators and companies. Jet Air started scheduled domestic operation for LOT Polish Airlines in winter 2005/06 with three BAe Jetstream 32, flying on routes with less demand (like Zielona Góra, Bydgoszcz, and Rzeszów).

On 11 October 2007, LOT Polish Airlines announced it would cut the amount of routes Jet Air would fly, citing the lesser desirability of Jetstream aircraft as well as limited demand for the destinations served by Jet Air. In the end, this enabled Jet Air to begin its own operation as a stand-alone airline. Jet Air-branded flights began in late 2007 and since then the airline rapidly expanded the number of destinations it flew to. Starting from October 2010, Jet Air operated flights on behalf of Ostfriesische Lufttransport (OLT) from their hub at Bremen Airport to both Nuremberg Airport and Brussels Airport. These flights ceased in May 2011.

=== Amber Gold ownership ===
In February 2012, Jet Air, now called OLT Jetair, after being bought by the Amber Gold Group, restarted operations as OLT Express Regional. It began to utilise the larger jet aircraft of its new sister operator OLT Express Poland (previously known as Yes Airways, a Polish charter airline, whom Amber Gold bought 85% of shares) under the common brand OLT Express. Whilst both carriers technically retain their own operating certificates, they, along with OLT Express Germany, use a common marketing strategy, reservations system and sales structure. Despite this, OLT Express' operations are not integrated with those of OLT Express Germany and both airlines operate their own individual route networks. OLT Express Regional's inaugural flight from Warsaw Chopin Airport to Gdańsk Lech Wałęsa Airport took place on 1 April 2012.

The airline's scheduled international and domestic flights were operated under the IATA/ICAO airline codes O2/JEA, using aircraft drawn from the fleets of both OLT Express Regional and OLT Express Poland, whilst charter flights were operated solely by OLT Express Poland, under the ICAO code YAP, using their Airbus A319 and A320 aircraft.

=== Bankruptcy ===
On 25 July 2012, OLT announced it was undergoing a dramatic re-organisation. Amber Gold was not in a position to provide the funding needed to continue normal operation.

Under the re-organisation, all its ATR aircraft would be grounded. It says it intends to raise 8,000,000 PLN from their sale; however, other sources state some of the aircraft are leased from Swift Air. The load factor on these flights was 11% according to the airline; however, they claim an overall load factor of 75% in June 2012, including its Airbus aircraft. It will cancel 14 routes served by these aircraft and move some crews across to the new Airbus craft due in September. However, some will have to be laid off as they would need to be fully retrained to operate these new aircraft.

The CEO of OLT admitted the airline was running at a substantial loss, approximately 600,000 euros per month. Ticket prices are due to rise from an average of 155 PLN to 180 PLN, and the number of the cheapest fare tickets on each flight will be reduced. Unlike other low-fares airlines, OLT had provided free drinks and snacks on its flights. They will stop this practice after the re-organisation and only provide free water, still unheard of for low-fares airlines. They intend to start their own catering company and re-introduce free catering and drinks on flights at a later date.

Amber Gold claims to have invested roughly 52 million euro in the airline to date. The airline's credit card service providers, BZ WBK and Volkswagen Bank have decided to terminate their relationship with the airline after they failed to provide guarantees the banks requested in July 2012.

There was also a dispute with the Polish Aviation Authority as they have failed to submit financial reports for 2011. OLT Express claims they have submitted the reports but the PAA claim they have not. The PAA set a deadline of the end of July 2012 for the reports to be submitted, or their licence to fly might be suspended or revoked.

On 26 July, 24 hours after announcing that ATR services would continue until 10 August, OLT announced all services using ATR aircraft would cease immediately. Some domestic services using Airbus aircraft were also cancelled, casting major doubts over the airline's future. The managing director had said OLT would pay for passengers to fly with other airlines, and then reneged on this promise.

On 27 July, all flights were suspended without notice and ticket sales were stopped. The website featured a banner which translates as "Ladies and Gentlemen, please be advised that from 27 July, all regular flights are suspended until further notice. At the same time, the sale of airline tickets will be halted." The airline had been flying for less than four months at that point. The airline head, Jarosław Frankowski, claimed to be in advanced talks with another airline to sell the company entirely. After failing to find a buyer and with credit card companies demanding far bigger deposits, the airline had insufficient cash-flow to continue. On 27 July 2012, they filed for bankruptcy, less than four months after starting operations.

=== Amber Gold financial questions ===
The Chairman of Amber Gold, Marcin Plichta, is a former bankrupt and was also convicted of embezzling 174,000 PLN (approx. US$80,000) from ca. 400 customers of his previous business, Multikasa, in 2008. He was given a 10-month sentence, suspended for 2 years. After the conviction, he changed his name from Stefanski to Plichta. He was only 24 years of age at the time. His wife, Katarzyna Plichta is chairperson of the supervisory board. Amber Gold is not approved by the Financial Supervision Authority to operate as a financial institution, and the FSA has gone to court in relation to this. The FSA have also issued a public alert to make that clear to potential customers, many of whom have had to wait months to recover money in the past. Amber Gold has since claimed it is a business that trades in precious metals and simply enters into storage contracts with its customers. The company claims to have about 100 kg of gold in reserve to cover deposits. It transacts its business through brokers. Their claim to offer up to 13.9% guaranteed annual returns has come in for scrutiny. In late July 2012 clients again stated they had difficulty recovering their money from Amber Gold. It had taken the Polish FSA to court for issuing a public alert which Amber Gold says is affecting its reputation. Amber Gold announced their intention to exit the airline industry entirely after both OLT Express Regional and Poland cancelled all operations.

On 13 August 2012, Amber Gold was liquidated.

== Destinations ==
List of all served, planned, and terminated flight destinations of OLT Express (until 31 July 2012 when it ceased all operations) and its airline predecessors: Jet Air (until 31 July 2011), OLT Jetair (until 23 March 2012) and Yes Airways.

=== Charter flights destinations ===
Planned destinations (never commenced due to airline's bankruptcy)
Terminated destinations

Destinations served by charter flights designated with the ICAO code YAP in the 2012 summer season.

City	Country	IATA code	ICAO code	Airport
Aqaba	Jordan	AQJ	OJAQ	King Hussein International Airport
Antalya	Turkey	AYT	LTAI	Antalya Airport
Batumi	Georgia	BUS	UGSB	Batumi International Airport
Bodrum	Turkey	BJV	LTFE	Milas–Bodrum Airport
Bydgoszcz	Poland	BZG	EPBY	Bydgoszcz Ignacy Jan Paderewski Airport
Chania	Greece	CHQ	LGSA	Chania International Airport
Corfu	Greece	CFU	LGKR	Corfu International Airport
Dalaman	Turkey	DLM	LTBS	Dalaman Airport
Dubrovnik	Croatia	DBV	LDDU	Dubrovnik Airport
Gdańsk	Poland	GDN	EPGD	Gdańsk Lech Wałęsa Airport
Gothenburg	Sweden	GOT	ESGG	Göteborg Landvetter Airport
Heraklion	Greece	HER	LGIR	Heraklion International Airport
Hurghada	Egypt	HRG	HEGN	Hurghada International Airport
İzmir	Turkey	ADB	LTBJ	Adnan Menderes Airport
Katowice	Poland	KTW	EPKT	Katowice International Airport
Kraków	Poland	KRK	EPKK	John Paul II International Airport Kraków-Balice
Lanzarote	Spain	ACE	GCRR	Lanzarote Airport
Luleå	Sweden	LLA	ESPA	Luleå Airport
Marsa Alam	Egypt	RMF	HEMA	Marsa Alam International Airport
Mombasa	Kenya	MBA	HKMO	Moi International Airport
Monastir	Tunisia	MIR	DTMB	Habib Bourguiba International Airport
Örebro	Sweden	ORB	ESOE	Örebro Airport
Palma de Mallorca	Spain	PMI	LEPA	Palma de Mallorca Airport
Poznań	Poland	POZ	EPPO	Poznań-Ławica Airport
Rhodes	Greece	RHO	LGRP	Rhodes International Airport
Sharm el-Sheikh	Egypt	SSH	HESH	Sharm el-Sheikh International Airport
Stockholm	Sweden	ARN	ESSA	Stockholm-Arlanda Airport
Sundsvall	Sweden	SDL	ESNN	Sundsvall-Härnösand Airport
Taba	Egypt	TCP	HETB	Taba International Airport
Umeå	Sweden	UME	ESNU	Umeå Airport
Varna	Bulgaria	VAR	LBWN	Varna Airport
Warsaw	Poland	WAW	EPWA	Warsaw Chopin Airport
Wrocław	Poland	WRO	EPWR	Wrocław Airport
Zadar	Croatia	ZAD	LDZD	Zadar Airport
Zakynthos	Greece	ZTH	LGZA	Zakynthos International Airport

==== Destinations served by Yes Airways ====
Destinations served only prior to name change from Yes Airways to OLT Express.

City	Country	IATA code	ICAO code	Airport
Faro	Portugal	FAO	LPFR	Faro Airport
Fuerteventura	Spain	FUE	GCFV	Fuerteventura Airport
Gran Canaria	Spain	LPA	GCLP	Gran Canaria Airport
Oujda	Morocco	OUD	GMFO	Angads Airport
Szczecin	Poland	SZZ	EPSC	"Solidarity" Szczecin-Goleniów Airport

=== Scheduled flights destinations ===
Destinations served by scheduled passenger flights designated with airline codes O2/JEA.

City	Country	IATA code	ICAO code	Airport
Amsterdam	Netherlands	AMS	EHAM	Amsterdam Airport Schiphol
Barcelona	Spain	BCN	LEBL	Barcelona El Prat Airport
Bristol	United Kingdom	BRS	EGGD	Bristol Airport
Brussels	Belgium	BRU	EBBR	Brussels Airport
Bydgoszcz	Poland	BZG	EPBY	Bydgoszcz Ignacy Jan Paderewski Airport
Cologne	Germany	CGN	EDDK	Cologne Bonn Airport
Cork	Ireland	ORK	EICK	Cork Airport
Dortmund	Germany	DTM	EDLW	Dortmund Airport
Edinburgh	United Kingdom	EDI	EGPH	Edinburgh Airport
Frankfurt	Germany	HHN	EDFH	Frankfurt-Hahn Airport
London	United Kingdom	LGW	EGKK	Gatwick Airport
Gdańsk	Poland	GDN	EPGD	Gdańsk Lech Wałęsa Airport
Gothenburg	Sweden	GOT	ESGG	Göteborg Landvetter Airport
Hamburg	Germany	HAM	EDDH	Hamburg Airport
Katowice	Poland	KTW	EPKT	Katowice International Airport
Kraków	Poland	KRK	EPKK	John Paul II International Airport Kraków-Balice
Liverpool	United Kingdom	LPL	EGGP	Liverpool John Lennon Airport
Lyon	France	LYS	LFLL	Lyon-Saint Exupéry Airport
Łódź	Poland	LCJ	EPLL	Łódź Władysław Reymont Airport
Marseille	France	MRS	LFML	Marseille Provence Airport
Memmingen	Germany	FMM	EDJA	Memmingen Airport
Milan	Italy	BGY	LIME	Orio al Serio Airport
Münster	Germany	FMO	EDDG	Münster Osnabrück Airport
Newcastle upon Tyne	United Kingdom	NCL	EGNT	Newcastle Airport
Oslo	Norway	OSL	ENGM	Oslo Airport, Gardermoen
Paris	France	ORY	LFPO	Paris-Orly Airport
Poznań	Poland	POZ	EPPO	Poznań-Ławica Airport
Reykjavík	Iceland	KEF	BIKF	Keflavík International Airport
Rome	Italy	FCO	LIRF	Leonardo da Vinci-Fiumicino Airport
Rzeszów	Poland	RZE	EPRZ	Rzeszów-Jasionka Airport
Saarbrücken	Germany	SCN	EDDR	Saarbrücken Airport
Stuttgart	Germany	STR	EDDS	Stuttgart Airport
Szczecin	Poland	SZZ	EPSC	"Solidarity" Szczecin-Goleniów Airport
Venice	Italy	VCE	LIPZ	Venice Marco Polo Airport
Verona	Italy	VRN	LIPX	Verona Airport
Warsaw	Poland	WAW	EPWA	Warsaw Chopin Airport
Wrocław	Poland	WRO	EPWR	Wrocław Airport
Zadar	Croatia	ZAD	LDZD	Zadar Airport

==== Destinations served by Jet Air and OLT Jetair ====
Destinations served by Jet Air (until 31 July 2011) and OLT Jetair (until 23 March 2012) but not offered by OLT Express. This list does not include destinations served solely by codeshare flights.

City	Country	IATA code	ICAO code	Airport
Berlin	Germany	TXL	EDDT	Berlin Tegel Airport
Berlin	Germany	THF	EDDI	Berlin Tempelhof Airport
Bremen	Germany	BRE	EDDW	Bremen Airport
Copenhagen	Denmark	CPH	EKCH	Copenhagen Airport
Dresden	Germany	DRS	EDDC	Dresden Airport
Helsinki	Finland	HEL	EFHK	Helsinki Airport^{[A]}
Heringsdorf	Germany	HDF	EDAH	Heringsdorf Airport
Lappeenranta	Finland	LPP	EFLP	Lappeenranta Airport^{[A]}
Munich	Germany	MUC	EDDM	Munich Airport
Nuremberg	Germany	NUE	EDDN	Nuremberg Airport
Oulu	Finland	OUL	EFOU	Oulu Airport^{[A]}
Prague	Czech Republic	PRG	LKPR	Prague Ruzyně Airport
Rotterdam	Netherlands	RTM	EHRD	Rotterdam The Hague Airport
Stockholm	Sweden	BMA	ESSB	Stockholm-Bromma Airport^{[A]}
Tampere	Finland	TMP	EFTP	Tampere-Pirkkala Airport^{[A]}
Turku	Finland	TKU	EFTU	Turku Airport
Vienna	Austria	VIE	LOWW	Vienna International Airport
Zielona Góra	Poland	IEG	EPZG	Zielona Góra Airport

Note

- A Only Wingo xprs or Fly Lappeenranta flights operated by Jet Air.

== Fleet ==
The day OLT Express ceased operations, its fleet consisted of the following aircraft (as of 26 July 2012):

Aircraft	In Service	Orders	Passengers	Operator	Note
Airbus A319-100	2	—	156	OLT Express Poland (YAP)	
Airbus A320-200	9	—	180	OLT Express Poland (YAP)	
ATR 72-200	2	—	68	OLT Express Regional (JEA)	
ATR 42-300	2	—	48	OLT Express Regional (JEA)	
Total	15	—			
