= Jetclub =

Mexican charter airline

- Fleet size: 2
- Headquarters: Mexico City, Mexico

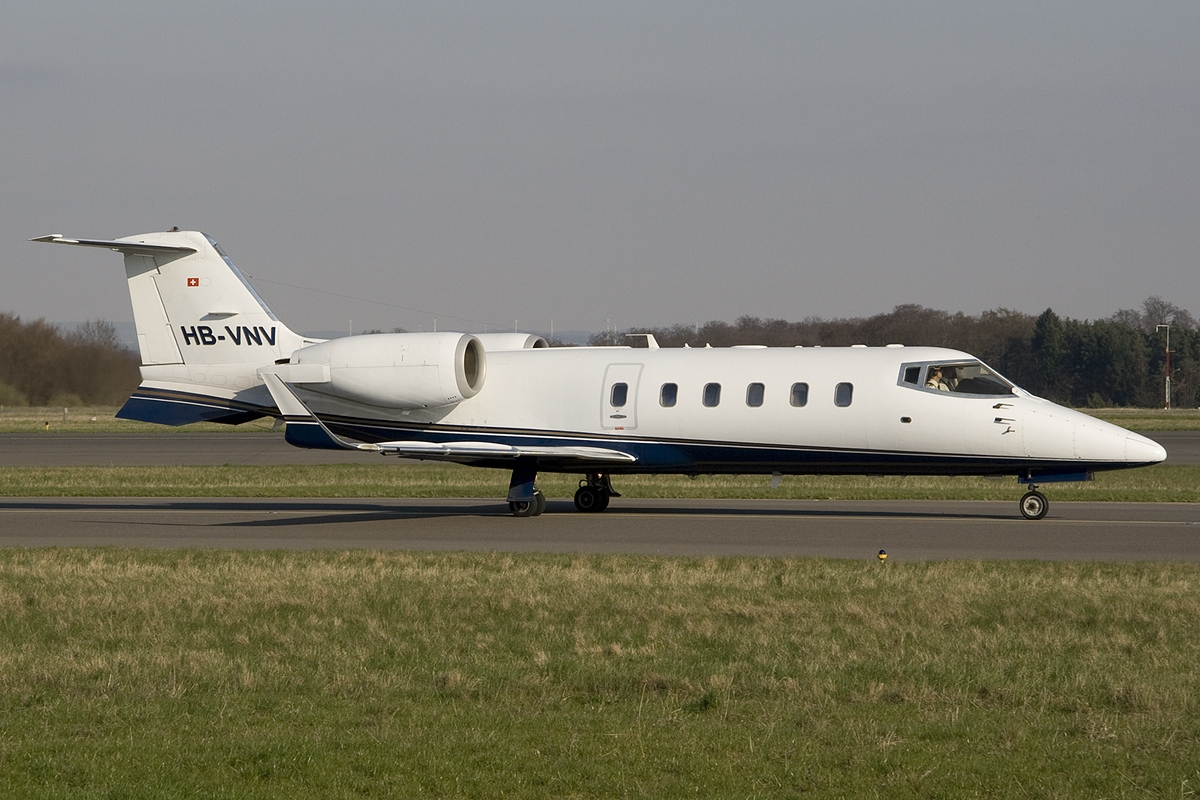
JetClub Bombardier Learjet 60

Jetclub is a charter airline based in Mexico City.

== Fleet ==
The Jetclub fleet consists of the following aircraft (as of 24 May 2008):

- 1 Airbus A320-211 (which is operated for Delta Air Lines)
- 1 Boeing 757-200 (which is operated by VIM Airlines)

The Boeing 757 was leased in 2008 May and only is suministred by VIM in the April–May season.
