= Jett8 Airlines =

Singaporean cargo airline

| IATA | ICAO | Call sign |
|---|---|---|
| JX | JEC | TAIPAN |
- Founded: 2005
- Commenced operations: 2007
- Ceased operations: 2012
- Hubs: Singapore Changi Airport
- Fleet size: 2
- Destinations: 5
- Headquarters: Singapore
- Key people: Tan H K Louis (Chairman and CEO)

Jett8 Airlines Pte Ltd was a cargo airline based in Singapore, which was incorporated on 8 March 2005. It was the second Singapore-based airline to offer all-cargo flights after Singapore Airlines Cargo. It was a privately owned airline with strategic alliance partnerships with Nippon Cargo Airlines and NYK Line. Jett8 launched its inaugural flight on 23 June 2007 to Hong Kong.

Jett8 Airlines did not get its air operator's certificate (AOC) renewed by the Civil Aviation Authority of Singapore when it expired on 31 May 2011 and has ceased operations. However, Jett8 managed to secure an AOC in August 2011, allowing it to continue to operate chartered flights for one more year.

== History ==
The airline, headed by Louis Tan, a former Singapore Airlines pilot, was targeting the cargo-charter market, to avoid head-on competition with Singapore Airlines Cargo and other scheduled cargo airlines. On May 31, 2007, Jett8 took delivery of its first aircraft, a Boeing 747-200SF previously operated by Nippon Cargo Airlines.

Jett8 Airlines was previously known as Jett8 Airlines Cargo when it was incorporated in 2005. However, on 1 April 2010, the company was renamed Jett8 Airlines.

== Destinations ==
Jett8 served the following destinations before it ceased operations:

| Hub |
| Future |
| Seasonal |
| Terminated route |

| Country | City | Airport | Notes | Refs |
|---|---|---|---|---|
| Hong Kong | Hong Kong | Hong Kong International Airport | Terminated | |
| Luxembourg | Luxembourg City | Luxembourg Airport | Terminated | |
| Netherlands | Amsterdam | Amsterdam Airport Schiphol | Terminated | |
| Singapore | Singapore | Changi Airport | Hub | |
| United Arab Emirates | Dubai | Dubai International Airport | Terminated | |
| Malaysia | Johor | Senai International Airport | Terminated | |

== Fleet ==
Prior to the company's closure in 2012, Jett8 Airlines operated 2 Boeing 747-200F with registrations 9V-JEA and 9V-JEB, from Nippon Cargo Airlines. 9V-JEA was given the name "Tai-pan", while 9V-JEB was named "Shogun". 9V-JEA was reregistered to N279SG and is currently placed in storage at Changi Airport. 9V-JEB was written off and preserved in Singapore as a firetrainer.
