= JetMagic =

Irish airline (2003–2004)

| IATA | ICAO | Call sign |
|---|---|---|
| GX | JMG | JETMAGIC |
- Founded: 2003
- Ceased operations: 2004
- Fleet size: 3

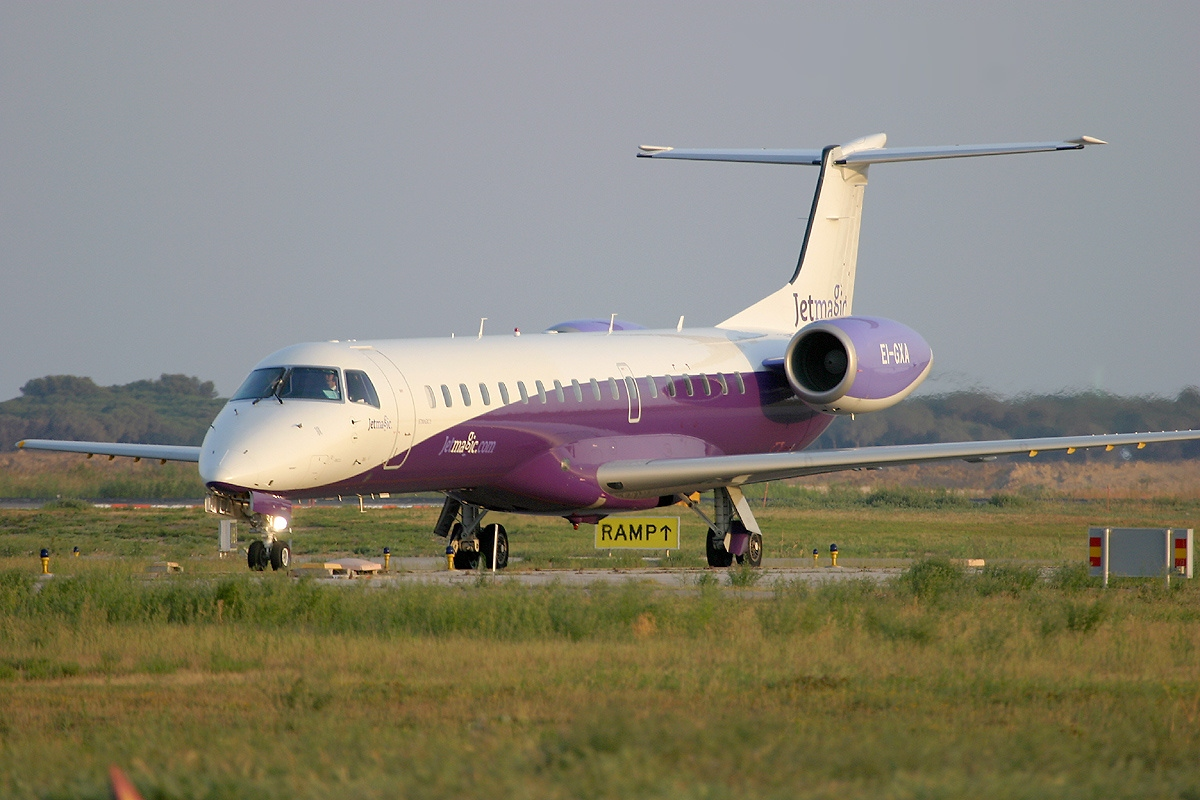
JetMagic Embraer 145

JetMagic was an Irish airline that operated between 2003 and 2004. It offered high-service flights aimed at business travelers, but at only a slight premium above the economy class rates. The average fares started at €75 and grew up to €250 based on demand. JetMagic sold itself on high quality and extra touches, like offering a free newspaper to all passengers, free catering, ice cream, etc.

JetMagic operated a fleet of 2 Embraer 145 aircraft and 1 Embraer 135 aircraft on it services to Belfast, Edinburgh and London City.

After an initial period with poor load factors, JetMagic increased its market share and offered routes that no other airline offered at the time. The airline operated a mixture of business and leisure routes from Cork Airport.

The airline offered a schedule oriented toward business travellers on a number of routes, including a double daily service to Brussels Airport on weekdays, with an additional Sunday evening service. A service to Belfast City Airport was also operated double daily on weekdays, with an additional Saturday morning service.

The most frequent service was to London City Airport, which was served three times daily on weekdays, with an additional Saturday morning and Sunday evening service, partly owing to weekend restrictions at London City Airport. However, the airline had to lease in alternate aircraft types in its first few months as the Embraer 135 was not yet certified for London City Airport operations.

Additional services to Liverpool Airport and Edinburgh Airport were later added.

JetMagic also operated several leisure routes, including Alicante, Nice and Barcelona as well as Milan and Rome, all of which were subsequently operated by Aer Lingus when JetMagic went out of business. Only Alicante and Barcelona remain in operation today. All of these services were operated either two or three times weekly during JetMagic's operation. The airline also operated shorter leisure routes, 3 times weekly to Jersey and Nantes from 24 May 2003 until 17 August.

It was noted that during its first summer that the sun routes were performing very well with 90% load factors in some cases to Nice, Alicante and Barcelona.

JetMagic unexpectedly ceased operations 28 January 2004, after one of its planes was impounded by Aer Rianta for failure to pay landing fees. The airline indefinitely suspended operations, and many passengers were left out-of-pocket for the cost of their tickets. Indeed, JetMagic had still been accepting bookings up until around 30 minutes before the news of its folding broke.

After the demise of JetMagic, the services to Belfast City Airport were taken up and subsequently cancelled by Aer Arann. The service to Liverpool Airport being operated by Ryanair and the route to Edinburgh Airport being operated by Aer Arann under the Aer Lingus regional franchise.

JetMagic's customer service desk at Cork Airport remained unoccupied since then, and is absent from the new terminal.
