= Moscow Aviation Repair Plant DOSAAF =

The Moscow Aviation Repair Plant DOSAAF or Moscow ARZ DOSAAF (Московский авиационно-ремонтный завод ДОСААФ, previously known as Moscow ARZ ROSTO) is a Russian aviation repair enterprise. It is located in the village of Ferdunovo in the Balashikhsa Urban District, Moscow Oblast, Russia. Full name - Closed Joint-Stock Company "Moscow Aviation Repair Plant DOSAAF" .

Its division is Chyornoye Airport 1 km. northeast of Ferdunovo.

It was established in 1939 as the OSOAVIAKHIM Moscow Oblast Aviation Repair Workshop basing on the Reutovo aviation club in the village Chyornoye, Moscow Oblast 55.74778°N 38.07528°E.
