= Bykovo Airport =

Defunct airport in Moscow, Russia

Bykovo Быково
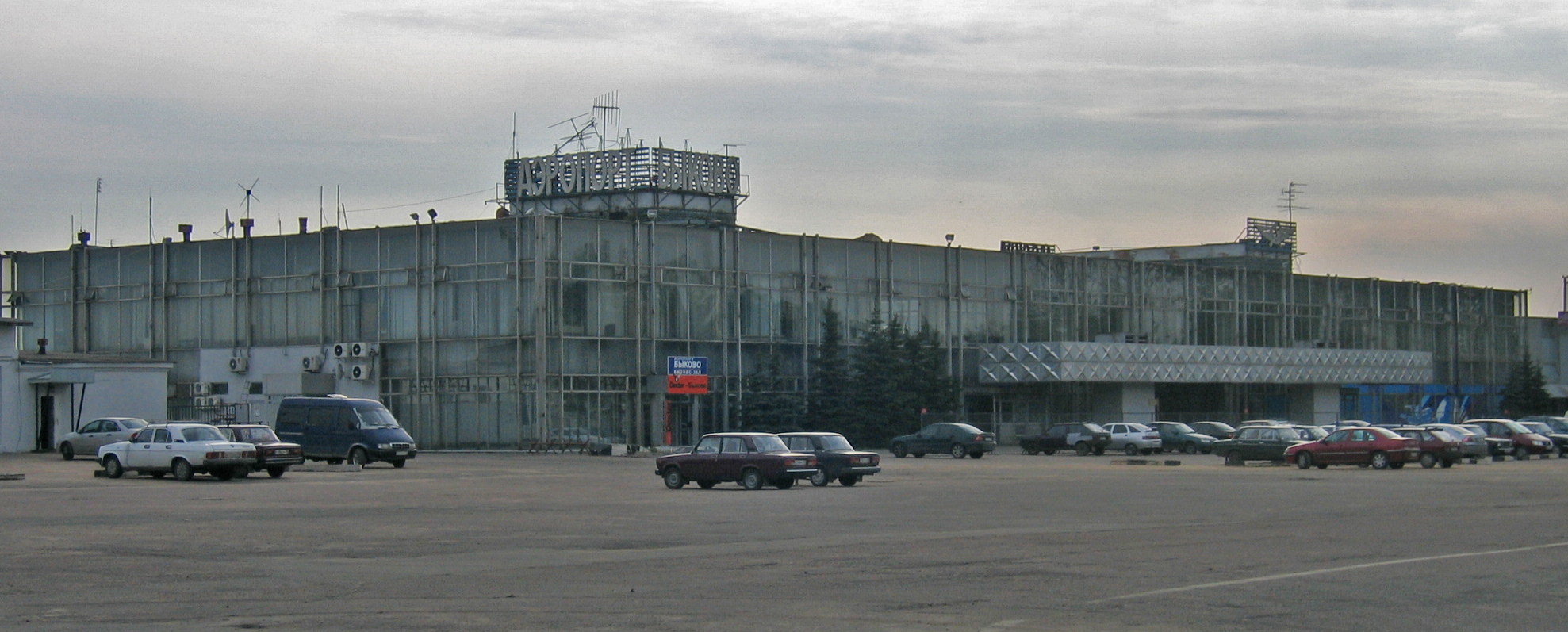
- IATA: BKA; ICAO: UUBB

Summary
- Airport type: Public
- Serves: Moscow
- Opened: 1933
- Closed: 2010
- Elevation AMSL: 432 ft / 132 m
- Coordinates: 55°37′20″N 38°03′50″E
- Interactive map of Bykovo

Runways
Direction	Length		Surface
Direction	ft	m	Surface
10/28	7,250	2,210

Statistics (2007)
- Number of passengers: 15,412
- Press release

Bykovo (Russian: Быково) (IATA: BKA, ICAO: UUBB) was a small regional airport serving Moscow, Russia, of which only the runway remains. The airport site is located about 35 kilometres (22 mi) southeast of the city along the Ryazan highway and railway close to the town of Zhukovsky. It has one 7,250 ft (2,210 m) runway. The airport served mainly short-haul domestic flights due to its short runway.

== History ==
Bykovo Airport first opened in 1933. The airport first had a grass-surfaced runway. During World War II, it was rebuilt (1000 × 80 m; brick-covered). In 1960, it was rebuilt again. In 1975, the terminal building was built (capable of serving 400 passengers per hour); in 1975, it served 1.5 million passengers. The airport was home to the charter flights department of Centre-Avia.

On 18 October 2010, passenger operations at the airport ended due to the expiration of lease terms with the management company. In 2011, the terminal building was demolished.

The airport shared its grounds with the Bykovo Aircraft Repair Facility, specializing in repairs and overhauls of Soloviev D-30 turbofans; the factory continues to use the runway for cargo delivery.

The new Zhukovsky International Airport (a.k.a. Ramenskoye) is a few kilometers southeast of Bykovo Airport.

== See also ==
- List of airports in Russia
