= Jet-2000 =

Russian airline

Jet-2000 Business Jets ООО "Авиакомпания Джет-2000"
IATA	ICAO	Call sign
-	JTT	MOSCOW JET
- Founded: 1999
- Destinations: charter
- Headquarters: Moscow, Russia
- Key people: Sergey N. Maltsev, General Director & CEO
- Website: jet2000.ru

Jet-2000 Business Jets, established in 1999, is a business aviation provider specialising in management for corporate and private aircraft in Russia and other countries of the post-Soviet area. The company holds a Russian Air Operator Certificate.

== Fleet ==
As of July 2022, the Jet-2000 fleet includes the following aircraft types:

- Antonov AN-74D
