= Air Mali (1960–1989) =

National airline of Mali (1960–1989)

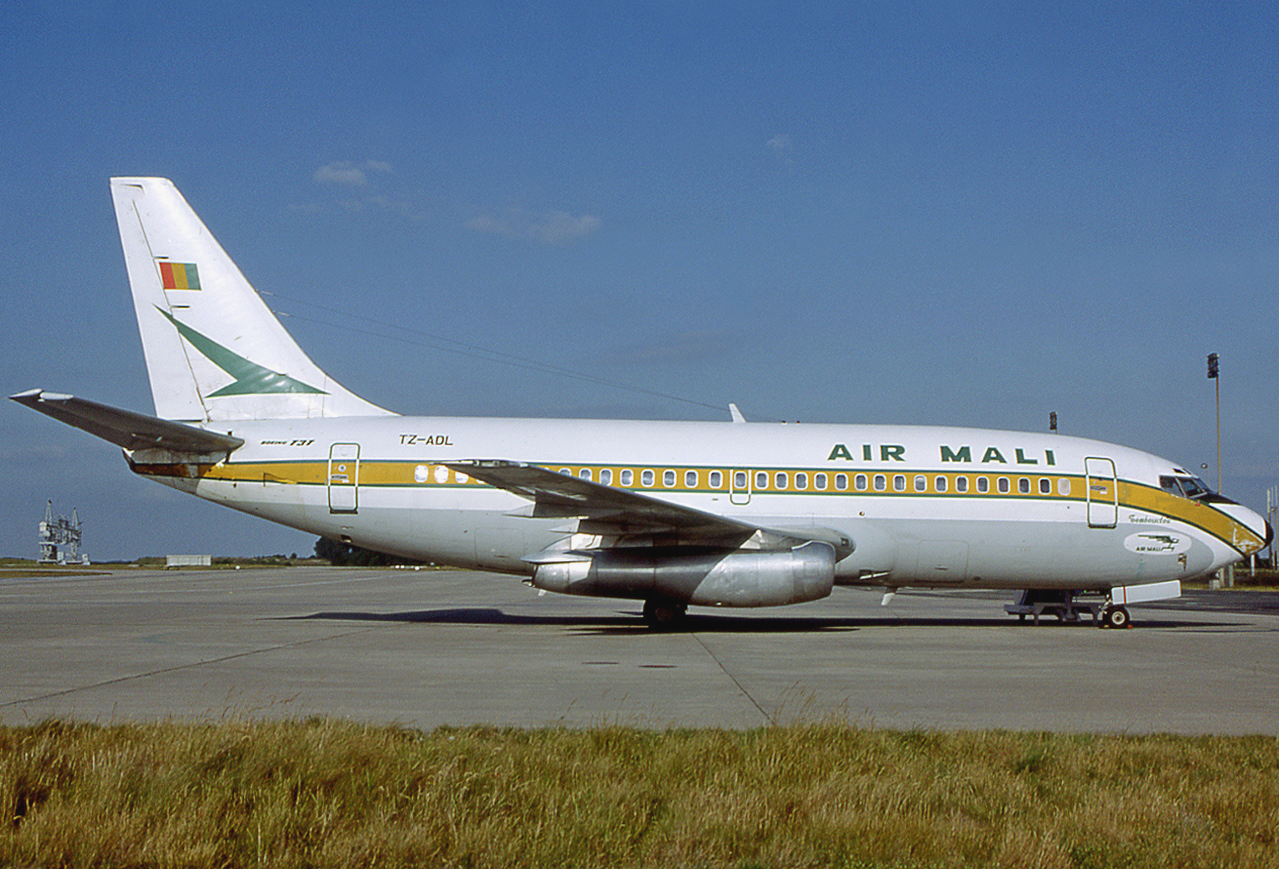
IATA	ICAO	Call sign
MY	AIM	AIR MALI
- Founded: 27 October 1960
- Commenced operations: 1961
- Ceased operations: 1988
- Headquarters: Bamako, Mali

Société Nationale Air Mali, or Air Mali as it was most commonly known, was the former national airline of the Republic of Mali. It had its head office in Bamako.

== History ==
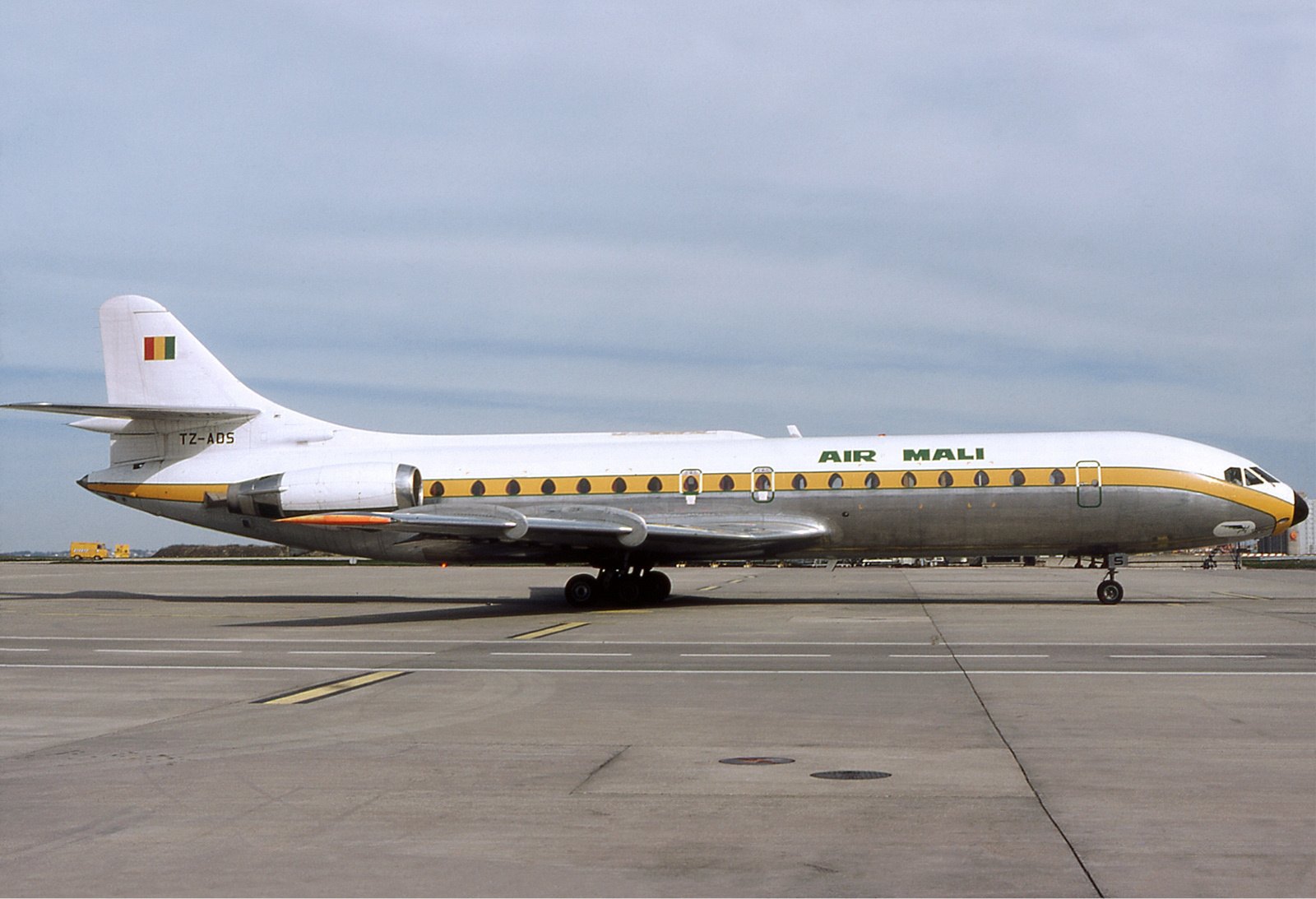
An Air Mali Sud Aviation Caravelle at Paris-Charles de Gaulle Airport. (1981)

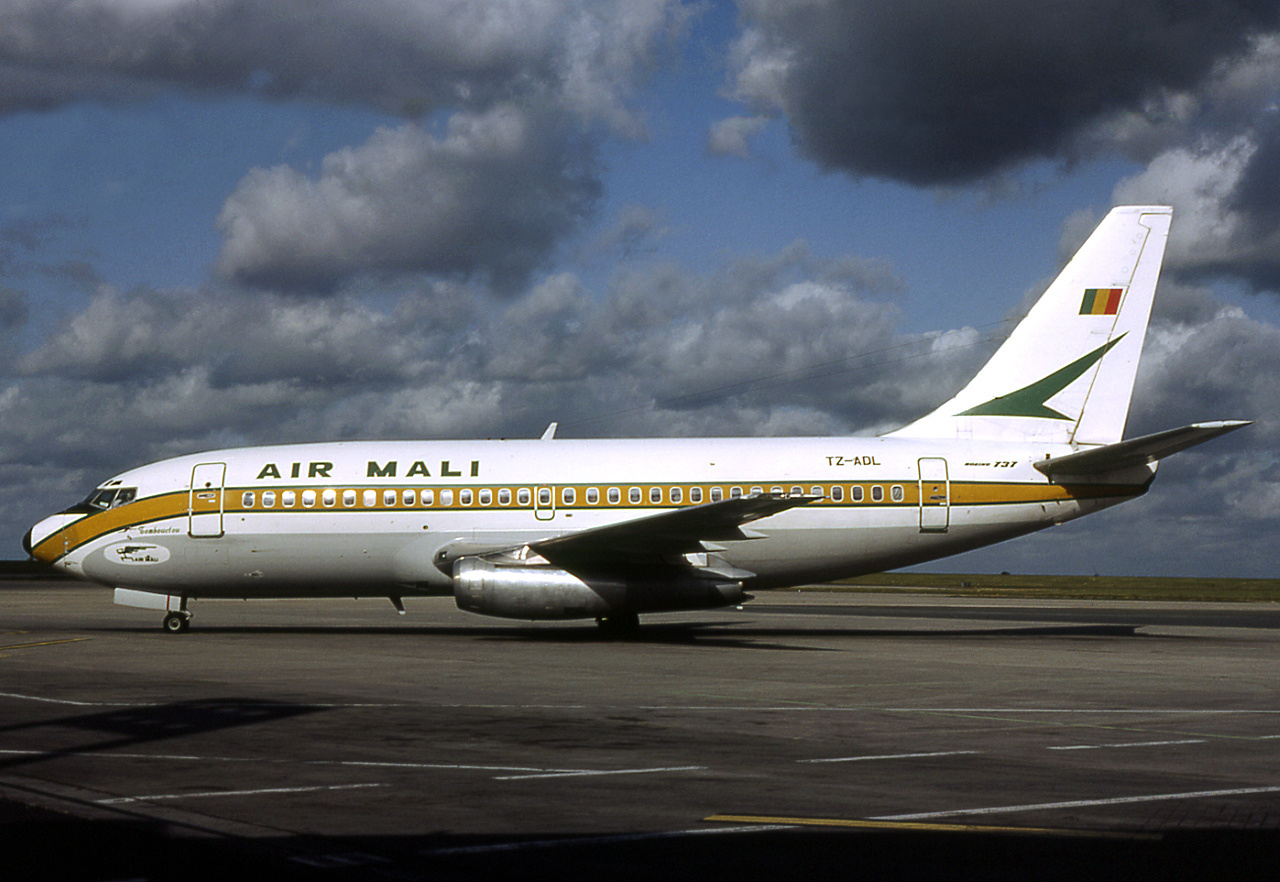
An Air Mali Boeing 737-200 Advanced at Paris-Charles de Gaulle Airport. (1983)

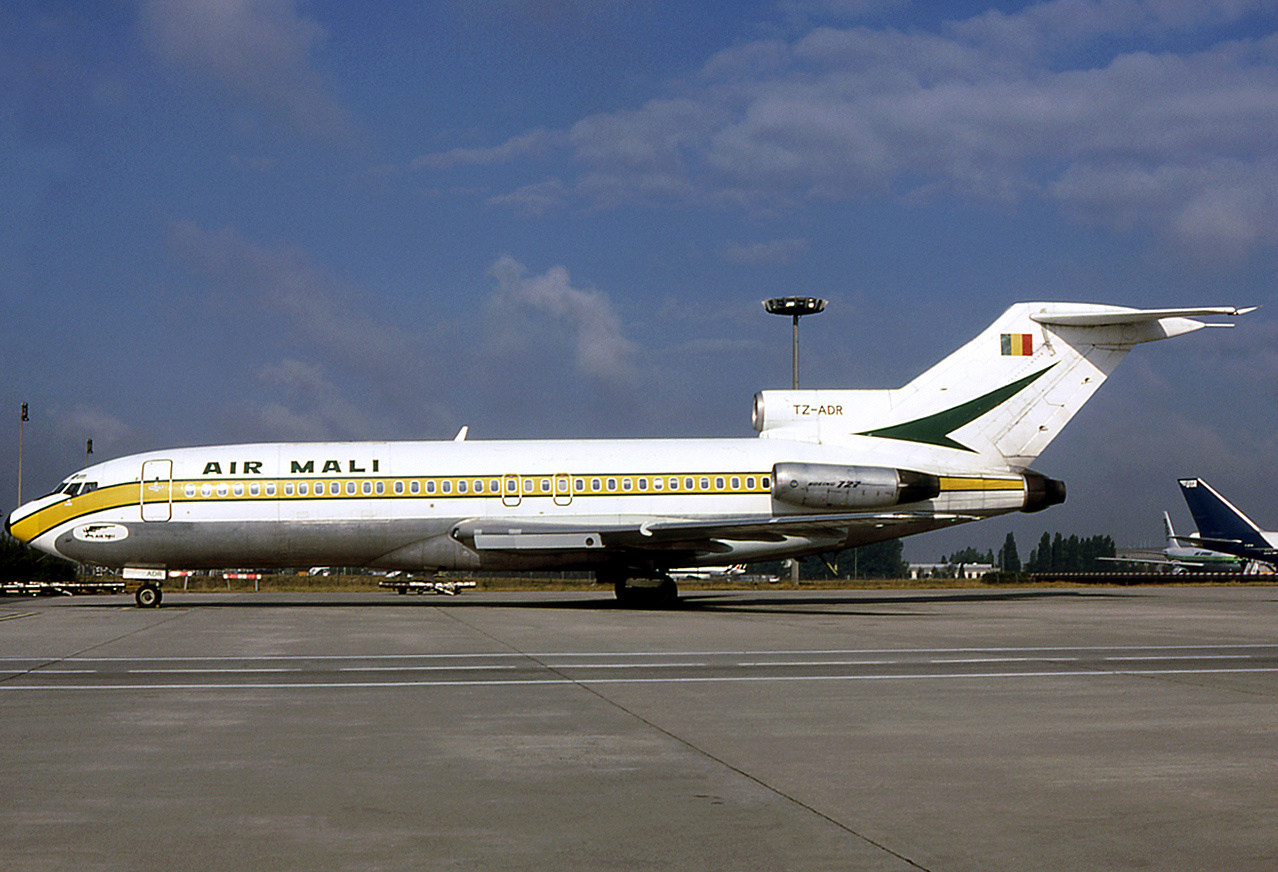
An Air Mali Boeing 727-100C at Paris-Charles de Gaulle Airport. (1984)

In June 1960, the Federal Assembly of the newly independent Mali Federation voted to set up a new national airline to be known as Air Mali. Société Nationale Air Mali was founded by the Malian government on 27 October 1960 with the intent of becoming the newly independent country's national airline. When the airline was founded, the legislation under which the airline was set up gave the airline exclusive rights on domestic flights, and international flights from the country to the outside world. The company which was founded with startup capital of CFA 50 million, was given the right to sell up to 45% of its shares to private investors; however, very few were sold.

Technical assistance was provided to the airline by the Soviet airline Aeroflot, which also provided equipment for the airline to begin operations. The British government donated three ex-British European Airways Douglas DC-3s, which the British purchased for GBP 70,000. The airline began flight operations in 1961, but initially only operated executive services for government officials from Bamako to various administratives centres on the country, and joined the International Air Transport Association in July 1961. The first domestic route which was taken over from Air France was one which linked Bamako to Gao on the River Niger, the once capital of the Songhai Empire. Prior to taking over the flight, Air France operated a weekly service with Douglas DC-4 equipment, and once flights were inaugurated by Air Mali, service was increased to twice-weekly with Douglas DC-3 equipment.

On 20 March 1961, a contract was signed in Moscow for the supply of a number of Ilyushin Il-18, Ilyushin Il-14, Antonov An-2 and Mil Mi-2 helicopters. The two Il-18s were delivered in August 1961, and with them Air Mali began and expanded its international network to include Paris, Casablanca and Marseille. The aircraft were initially flown with Soviet crews whilst African crews were trained in their operations. The airline began flights to Ghana in December 1961, and regional destinations, some inherited from Union Aéromaritime de Transport, included Monrovia, Abidjan, Accra, Douala, Brazzaville, Dakar and Conakry, utilising the Il-14s and DC-3s.

Air Mali was the first airline to provide service to many Malian cities which had previously not received air services. The airline's domestic network was for the most part unprofitable, however, this was subsidised by profits the airline made on its regional and international networks. The Bamako-Accra route which was suspended at the time of the 1966 coup in Ghana was restarted in 1967, and on 14 September of the same year Aviaexport announced the signing of a deal with Air Mali for the supply of two Antonov An-24, which when delivered were operated on domestic and regional routes, such as Bamako-Mopti-Goundam-Timbouctou-Gao-Niamey. The airline was forced to seek a replacement for the Il-18s by the end of the 1960s, as the turboprops had become too expensive to operate and maintain.

The airline's first jet aircraft, a Boeing 727-100C was acquired in 1971 to enable the airline to service longer-range international routes to Paris, Marseille and Casablanca. The 727 was joined not long after by a Boeing 737-100 for use on medium-range regional routes in Africa. By March 1980, Air Mali had 577 employees; at this time, the fleet included one Antonov An-24B, one Boeing 707-320C, one Boeing 727-100C, one Ilyushin Il-18 and two Twin Otters that flew international routes to Abidjan, Accra, Banjul, Brazzaville, Casablanca, Conakry, Douala, Freetown, Lagos, Libreville, Lome, Monrovia, Niamey and Paris, and domestic services to Gao, Goundam, Kayes, Kenieba, Mopti, Nara, Nioro, Timbuctou and Yelimane.

On 22 February 1985, the An-24 experienced an engine explosion upon take-off from Timbuktu Airport, eventually crashing before reaching the airport of departure. Following this accident, and also because of large debts the airline had incurred, the government forced the airline to close down in 1988 with its operations being taken over by Malitas in 1989.

== Destinations ==
The airline served the following destinations throughout its history.

City	Airport code		Airport name	Refs
City	IATA	ICAO	Airport name	Refs
Algeria
Algiers	ALG	DAAG	Houari Boumediene Airport	
Burkina Faso
Ouagadougou	OUA	DFFD	Ouagadougou Airport	
Ivory Coast
Abidjan	ABJ	DIAP	Port Bouet Airport	
Bouaké	BYK	DIBK	Bouaké Airport	
France
Paris	CDG	LFPG	Charles de Gaulle Airport	
Paris	LBG	LFBG	Le Bourget Airport	
Guinea
Conakry	CKY	GUCY	Conakry International Airport	
Liberia
Monrovia	ROB	GLRB	Roberts International Airport	
Mali
Bamako	BKO	GABS	Senou International Airport	
Gao	GAQ	GAGO	Gao International Airport	
Goundam	GUD	GAGM	Goundam Airport	
Kayes	KYS	GAKY	Kayes Airport	
Kenieba	KNZ	GAKA	Kenieba Airport	
Mopti	MZI	GAMB	Mopti Airport	
Nara	NIX	GANR	Keibane Airport	
Nioro	NIX	GANR	Nioro Airport	
Tomboctou	TOM	GATB	Timbuktu Airport	
Yélimané	EYL	GAYE	Yélimané Airport	
Mauritania
Aioun el Atrouss	AEO	GQNA	Aioun el Atrouss Airport	
Morocco
Casablanca	CMN	GMMN	Mohammed V International Airport	
Niger
Niamey	NIM	DRRN	Diori Hamani International Airport	
Nigeria
Lagos	BZV	FCBB	Murtala Muhammed International Airport	
Republic of the Congo
Brazzaville	LOS	DNMM	Maya-Maya Airport	
Senegal
Dakar	DKR	GOOY	Léopold Sédar Senghor International Airport	
Sierra Leone
Freetown	FNA	GFLL	Lungi International Airport	
Togo
Lomé	LFW	DXXX	Lomé-Tokoin Airport	

== Fleet ==
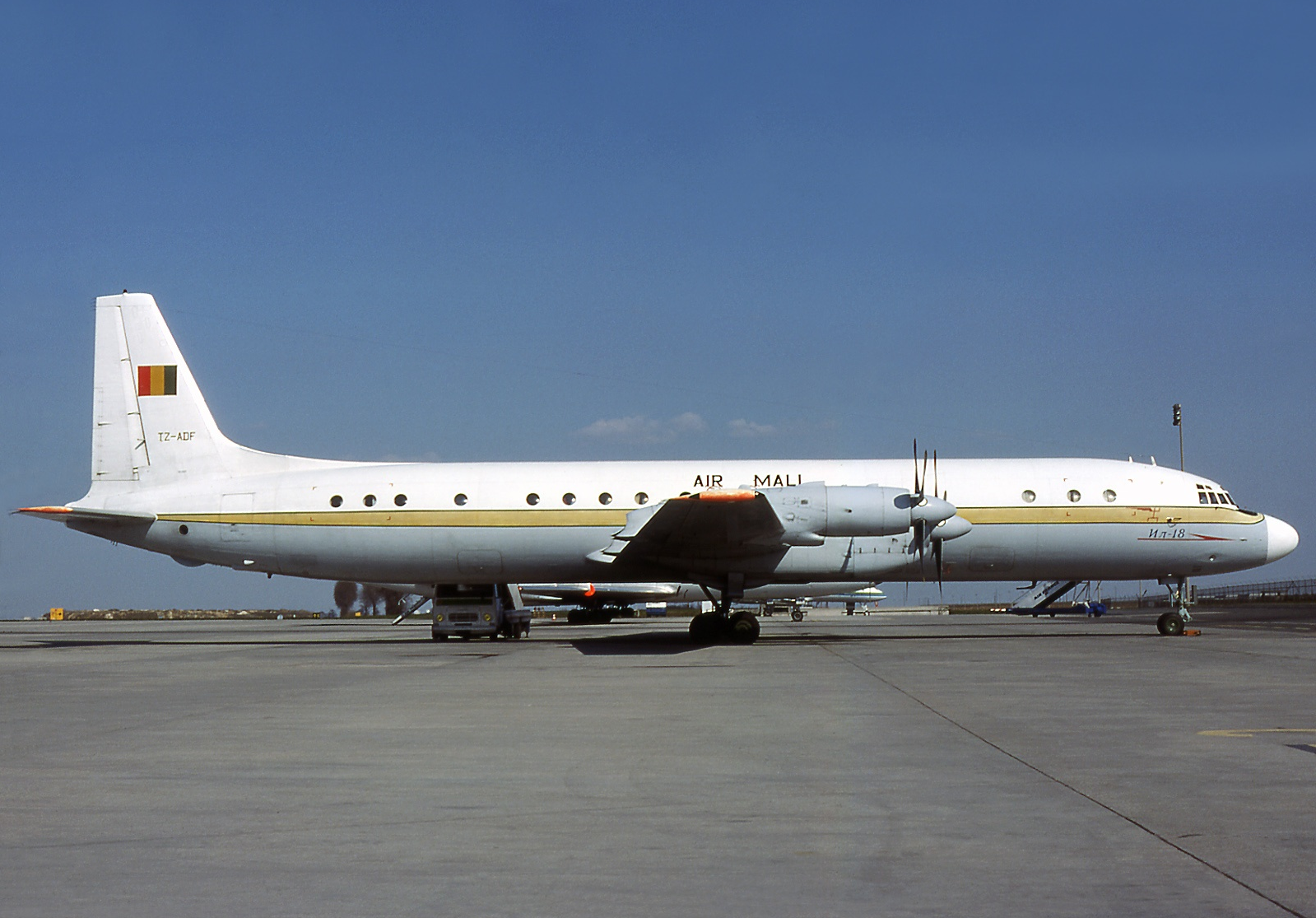
An Air Mali Ilyushin Il-18V at Paris-Charles de Gaulle Airport in 1979

The airline operated the following equipment all through its history:

- Airbus A300B4
- Antonov An-2
- Antonov An-24B
- Antonov An-24RV
- Boeing 707-320C
- Boeing 727-100C
- Boeing 737-200
- Caravellle III
- Caravelle 10B
- Douglas C-47A
- Ilyushin Il-14
- Ilyushin Il-14P
- Ilyushin Il-18D
- Ilyushin Il-18V
- Twin Otter

== Accidents and incidents ==
According to Aviation Safety Network, Air Mali experienced five hull-loss events throughout its history. Following is a list of these events; four of them were deadly, totalling 111 fatalities.

Date	Location	Aircraft	Tail number	Fate	Fatalities	Description	Refs
5 November 1966	(France) Cayolle Pass	Il-14M	TZ-ABH	W/O	7/7	Crashed in the French Alps. The aircraft was flying the second leg of a Minsk–Zagreb–Marseille–Bamako route.	
11 August 1974	(Republic of Upper Volta) Linoghin	Il-18V	TZ-ABE	W/O	47/60	The airplane was due to operate a non-scheduled international Bamako–Niamey–Kano–Mecca passenger service. On its first leg, it was diverted to Ouagadougou because of bad weather at Niamey. A forced landing was made after the aircraft ran out of fuel flying over the wrong city, apparently due to a navigational error.	
21 June 1983	(Mali) Bamako	Twin Otter 300	TZ-ACH	W/O	7/7	Crashed under unspecified circumstances.	
22 February 1985	(Mali) Timbuktu	An-24B	TZ-ACT	W/O	51/52	Experienced an engine failure just after takeoff from Timbuktu Airport bound for Bamako. The aircraft crashed before returning to the departure airport.	
May 1985	Unknown	BN-2A-9	TZ-ACS	W/O	Unknown	Unknown	

== See also ==
- Transport in Mali
