= Konaté =

Konaté or Konate is a West-African patronymic surname. Notable people with the surname include:

- Abdoulaye Konaté (born 1953), Malian artist
- Ben Konaté (born 1986), Ivorian-born Equatoguinean football player
- Cheick Oumar Konaté (born 2004), Malian football player
- Djibril Konaté (born 1980), Malian football player
- Famoudou Konaté, Malinké drummer from Guinea
- Hamadou Konaté, Malian politician
- Ibrahima Konaté, French football player
- Kadiatou Konaté, Malian director and screenwriter
- Karim Konaté (born 2004), Ivorian football player
- Losseni Konaté (born 1972), Ivorian football player
- Madiou Konate (born 1982), Senegalese football player
- Mamadou Konaté (1897–1956), Malian politician
- Mamadou Konate (footballer) (born 1985), Ivorian football player
- Moussa Konaté
  - Moussa Konaté (footballer) (born 1993), Senegalese football player
  - Moussa Konaté (kickboxer) (born 1978), French Muay Thai kickboxer
  - Moussa Konaté (writer) (1951–2013), Malian writer
- Naré Maghann Konaté (died 1218), 12th-century king of the Mandinka people, in what is today Mali
- Pa Konate, Swedish Football player of Senegalese descent
- Sagaba Konate (born 1997), Malian basketball player
- Sékouba Konaté (born 1964), officer of the Guinean army, formerly Vice President of its military junta
- Souleimane Konate (born 1984), French heavyweight kickboxer and martial artist
- Tiémoko Konaté (born 1990), Ivorian football player
- Valy Konaté (born 2006), Ivorian footballer
- Yacouba Konaté (born 1953), Ivorian curator, writer, art critic, and professor

== See also ==
- Konaty
- Kownatka
- Kownaty (disambiguation)
