= Aéroports du Mali =

- Industry: Airport Management
- Founded: 1970; 56 years ago
- Headquarters: Bamako, Mali

Aéroports du Mali (ADM; English: Airports of Mail) is a Malian company in charge of commercial exploitation, protection and development of facilities and equipment of Mali's airports open to public air traffic. Its headquarters is in the capital city Bamako. Its mission is to ensure the commercial management of airports, the coordination of activities on airport platforms, and the development and improvement of the infrastructures entrusted to it.

It runs under the auspices of the Agence Nationale de l'Aviation Civile (ANAC), which is responsible for all civil aviation in Mali and operates under the Ministère de l'Equipement et des Transportes.

Aéroports du Mali was created in 1970 as a public institution. Since January 2016, Bamako International Airport has been named after Mali's father of independence, Modibo Keïta. It includes nine airports throughout Mali: six international airports (Bamako-Senou, Kayes Dag Dag, Mopti Ambodedjo, Sikasso Dignagan, Timbuktu and Gao) and three national airports (Nioro, Yelimane and Goundam).
