= Kayes Dag-Dag Airport =

Kayes Dag Dag Airport Aéroport de Kayes Dag-Dag
- IATA: KYS; ICAO: GAKY

Summary
- Airport type: Public
- Owner: Aéroports du Mali
- Operator: Aéroports du Mali
- Serves: Kayes
- Location: Kayes, Mali
- Opened: 18 September 2011; 15 years ago
- Elevation AMSL: 164 ft (50 m)
- Coordinates: 14°28′54″N 011°24′07″W

Map
- Location of airport in Mali

Runways
| Direction | Length | | Surface |
| Direction | m | ft | Surface |
|---|---|---|---|
| 07/25 | 2,700 | 8,858 | Asphalt |

Kayes Dag-Dag Airport is an airport serving Kayes, in the Kayes Region of Mali, about 6.3 kilometres (3.9 mi) from Kayes city centre.

On September 18, 2011, the president of the republic at the time, Amadou Toumani Touré, inaugurated the rehabilitated airport.

== Facility ==
The airport was modernized by works that lasted from 2009 to 2011, with the runway being extended from 1,600 m to 2,700 m in 2009, and a new 2,000 m^{2} terminal was built.

The aircraft parking and ground handling area has been enlarged (from an initial area of 7,000 m^{2}, the tarmac now measures 11,000 m^{2}).

On September 18, 2011, the president of the republic at the time, Amadou Toumani Touré, inaugurated the rehabilitated airport.

A fuel depot was completed in May 2016, allowing commercial and private aircraft to refuel at the airport.

== Airlines and destinations ==
| Airlines | Destinations |
|---|---|
| Sky Mali | Bamako |
