= Air Algérie Flight 5017 =

2014 aviation accident in Mali

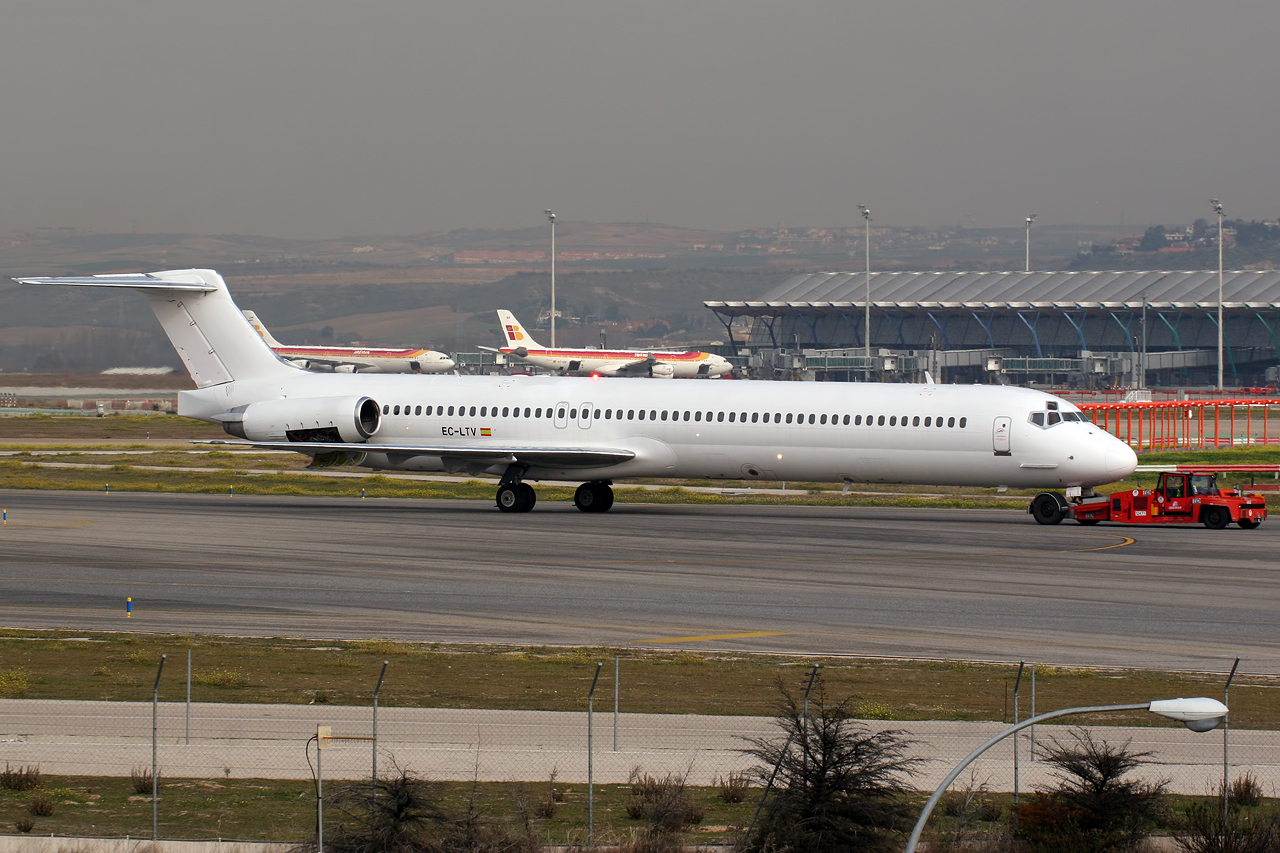
- EC-LTV, the aircraft involved in the accident, photographed in 2013

Accident
- Date: 24 July 2014
- Summary: Crashed after high-altitude stall in icing conditions
- Site: Tombouctou Region, Near Hombori, Mali; 15°08′08″N 01°04′49″W

Aircraft
- Aircraft type: McDonnell Douglas MD-83
- Operator: Swiftair on behalf of Air Algérie
- IATA flight No.: AH5017
- ICAO flight No.: DAH5017
- Call sign: AIR ALGERIE 5017
- Registration: EC-LTV
- Flight origin: Ouagadougou Airport, Burkina Faso
- Destination: Houari Boumediene Airport, Algiers, Algeria
- Occupants: 116
- Passengers: 110
- Crew: 6
- Fatalities: 116
- Survivors: 0

Air Algérie Flight 5017 was a scheduled international passenger flight from Ouagadougou, Burkina Faso, to Algiers, Algeria, which crashed near Gossi, Mali, on 24 July 2014. The McDonnell Douglas MD-83 twinjet, operated by Spanish charter airline Swiftair for Air Algérie, disappeared from radar about fifty minutes after take-off. All 110 passengers and 6 crew members on board died.

The Malian authorities, assisted by the French Bureau of Enquiry and Analysis for Civil Aviation Safety (BEA), published an investigation report in April 2016, concluding that, while the aircraft was cruising on autopilot, ice accretion on the engines caused a reduction of thrust that led to a high-altitude stall. The crew never tried to recover from the stall, and the aircraft crashed. The BEA issued several recommendations to Air Algérie, the US Federal Aviation Administration, and the Governments of Burkina Faso and Mali. Until final number of fatalities is confirmed for the 2023 Il-76 crash in Gao, the crash of Flight 5017 remains the deadliest accident in Malian aviation history. On the legal front, Swiftair was brought to trial before the Paris Criminal Court on 9 March 2026, nearly twelve years after the crash, on charges of involuntary manslaughter.

== Accident ==
The crash site in Mali with the departure airport

Flight 5017 departed from Ouagadougou Airport at 1:15 local time (UTC) on 24 July 2014. It was scheduled to land at Houari Boumediene Airport, Algiers, at 5:10 local time (4:10 UTC).

The aircraft reached cruise altitude, flight level 310 (31,000 feet (9,400 m)), 22 minutes after departure and attained its target speed of 280 knots (520 km/h; 320 mph) (IAS). About two minutes later, it began to gradually lose speed, and, though the speed did eventually drop to 200 knots (370 km/h; 230 mph), the aircraft maintained FL310. After an unspecified length of time had passed, the aircraft began to descend, and the speed dropped to about 160 knots (300 km/h; 180 mph). Afterwards, the aircraft entered a left-hand turn and began to lose altitude more rapidly, thus spiralling down. The flight data recording stopped at 1:47; at the time, the aircraft was at an altitude of 1,600 feet (490 m) and a speed of 380 knots (700 km/h; 440 mph). It crashed into the ground at 270 metres (890 ft) above sea level about a second later.

On 28 July, it was revealed that the flight crew had asked to return to Burkina Faso, after first requesting to deviate from course because of bad weather. There was a mesoscale convective system in the area at the time, and the aircraft had deviated to the left of its course to avoid it. Satellite images apparently identifying the light flare from the aircraft impact at the margins of the thunderstorm were captured.

Initially there were conflicting reports of the location of the crash. The aircraft's flight route took it over Mali, and it was reported to have disappeared between Gao and Tessalit. French forces reported detecting wreckage of the aircraft in an area between Gao and Kidal, in a desert region that is difficult to access. France sent a military unit to secure the wreckage of the Air Algérie plane. Malian President Ibrahim Boubacar Keïta said wreckage had been found in the country's northern desert, between Aguelhok and Kidal. There were also reports of wreckage being found near the town of Tilemsi in Mali, with officials from Algeria, Burkina Faso, and France having issued conflicting details.

== Aircraft ==
The aircraft involved in the accident was a McDonnell Douglas MD-83, MSN 53190, line number 2148. It was powered by two Pratt & Whitney JT8D engines and first flew in June 1996 and was 18 years old at the time of the accident.

The aircraft was acquired by Swiftair, a charter flight operator, and re-registered EC-LTV in 2012 after being used by several airlines such as Flash Airlines and Avianca since it was delivered in 1996. It was wet-leased to Air Algérie in June 2014 to provide additional capacity during the summer 2014 season.

At the time of its loss, EC-LTV had flown 32,000 cycles. (Note: A pressurisation cycle, usually equating to a flight) The director of the Directorate General for Civil Aviation (DGAC) of France, Patrick Gandil, said the plane had been checked in France "two or three days ago" and that it was "in good condition".

== Passengers and crew ==
People on board by nationality (Air Algérie count)
| Country | Persons |
|---|---|
| Algeria | 6 |
| Belgium | 1 |
| Burkina Faso | 28 |
| Cameroon | 1 |
| Canada | 5 |
| Egypt | 1 |
| France | 52 |
| Germany | 4 |
| Lebanon | 6 |
| Luxembourg | 2 |
| Mali | 1 |
| Nigeria | 1 |
| Spain | 6 |
| Switzerland | 1 |
| United Kingdom | 1 |
| Total | 116 |

There were 110 passengers on the plane; of those, 52 were French citizens, at least 33 of whom were French military personnel serving in Africa including three senior intelligence officials. A senior Hezbollah leader who had been posing as a businessman in Senegal and Burkina Faso was also on board. Others came from Burkina Faso, Lebanon, Algeria, Spain, Canada, Germany and Luxembourg. An Air Algérie representative in Burkina Faso, Kara Terki, told a news conference that all passengers were in transit to Europe, the Middle East, or Canada. The number of persons holding multiple citizenship onboard was apparently high. The Lebanese embassy in Abidjan estimated the number of Lebanese citizens on the flight, some of whom had dual nationality, was at least 20. One Chilean had French nationality. There was initial uncertainty about the exact number of French citizens and number of passengers on board.

On 25 July, French President François Hollande stated that there were no survivors. All of the victims had been identified by 19 November, nearly 4 months after the accident.

The crew members of Flight 5017 were Captain Agustín Comerón Mogio (47), First Officer Isabel Gost Caimari (42), and four flight attendants; all six were Spanish.

Captain Comerón had accumulated a total flying experience of 12,988 flying hours, including 8,689 as a captain, in which 10,007 flying hours were on the type. From 1989 to 1994, he became a co-pilot on a McDonnell Douglas MD-80 with Centennial. From 1997 to 2012, he became a co-pilot, and subsequently promoted to a captain on an MD-80 in Spanair. He finally joined Swiftair as a captain on an MD-80. He also had served for the UN mission in Africa based in Khartoum, Sudan. He had flown an aircraft to various places in Africa including to Ouagadougou. From the start of his operations with Air Algerie on 20 June 2014, Captain Comerón had carried out 45 flights and 100 flying hours.

First Officer Gost had accumulated a total flying experience of 7,016 flying hours including 6,180 flying hours as a co-pilot on MD-80. Since 20 June 2014, date of the start of operations with Air Algerie, First Officer Gost had carried out 43 flights and 93 flying hours. From 1995 to 1998, she became a dispatcher at Spanair; From 1998 to 2012, as a co-pilot on an MD-80 in Spanair, and on 1 June 2013 she joined Swiftair S.A. as a co-pilot on an MD-80. Between 1998 and 2012, as a co-pilot with Spanair, she had flown to various aerodromes in Africa, including the one at Ouagadougou.

== Aftermath ==
=== Search effort ===
The wreckage was found southeast of Gossi, Mali, and United Nations personnel moved to secure the crash site on 25 July. French television showed images of the wreckage site taken by a soldier from Burkina Faso. The brief footage showed a desolate area with scattered debris that was unrecognizable. There were bits of twisted metal but no identifiable parts such as the fuselage or tail, or victims' bodies. Scrubby vegetation could be seen scattered in the background. A French Reaper drone based in Niger spotted the wreckage after getting alerts from Burkina Faso and Malian soldiers. French soldiers were the first to reach the site. Burkina Faso's prime minister, Luc Adolphe Tiao, reviewed videos of the wreckage site and said that identifying the victims would be challenging.

=== Reactions ===
Because most of those on board were French citizens, France declared three days of national mourning following the crash. Flags flew at half mast on every public building from 28 July for three days. Algeria also declared a three-day mourning period.

Burkina Faso also began two days of mourning over the crash which killed 28 Burkina Faso citizens. During the mourning period, flags in Burkina Faso flew at half mast while all public celebrations were cancelled. The Burkinabé Minister for National Security assured the families of victims that the government would do all it can to shed light on the circumstances leading to the crash.

During October 2014, Air Algerie officially retired flight numbers AH5016 and AH5017 to honor the lives of those lost in the crash. On 24 July 2015, one year after the crash, a vigil and memorial to the victims was held in Ouagadougou. Relatives of the crash laid flowers and candles at a cemetery, and it was stated that the remains of unidentified victims of the crash would be buried in Bamako, the capital of Mali.

== Investigation ==
The Malian authorities opened an investigation, with the President of the Mali Commission of Inquiry (French: Président de la Commission d'enquête du Mali) as the director, and the French Bureau of Enquiry and Analysis for Civil Aviation Safety (BEA) provided technical assistance.

On 27 July, BEA investigators arrived at the crash site to collect evidence. Both black boxes were recovered, and data from the flight data recorder (FDR) was read out. The cockpit voice recorder (CVR) had been damaged in the impact and repaired, but "the magnetic tape recordings were unusable, apparently due to a recorder malfunction, with no link to accident damage. As a result, the investigation prioritized alternative sources, like records of air-traffic transmissions.

On 7 August, the investigation team held a press conference at BEA's headquarters in Paris. They outlined the team structure (three international working groups assigned to the "aircraft", "systems" and "operations" each) and presented an abridged timeline and a reconstruction of the aircraft's flight path. An interim report was scheduled to be published mid-September. Following the conference, Gérard Feldzer, an aviation expert, told BFMTV that the aircraft trajectory recorded by the FDR strongly suggested the plane had stalled in bad weather.

On 20 September, the BEA released an interim report into the crash. The report contained data extracted from the FDR, as well as an explanation why the CVR was mostly unusable: the CVR did record cockpit noises and conversations on the tape, but without erasing the existing content, the record was an mix of numerous hours of recording on a 32-minute tape. Parts of the radio exchanges with ATC could be made out, but it is not known whether the remainder of the cockpit conversations, for which no external recording exists, will be able to be determined.

On 2 April 2015, the BEA announced that a consensus had emerged that erratic and erroneous values of the engine pressure ratio (EPR) appeared for both engines two to three minutes after levelling off at an altitude of 31,000 feet (9,400 m). The EPR is the main parameter for engine power management, and is derived from pressure sensors at the engine inlets. The sensors had probably become clogged with ice. Icing is normally prevented by a hot-air anti-ice, which was not activated by the aircrew during climb and cruise, according to BEA "analysis of the available data". The faulty EPR values caused the engine controllers to limit the thrust to much less than required to maintain sufficient airspeed at that altitude. The autopilot maintained altitude by increasing the angle of attack until a stall occurred. Twenty seconds after the initial stall, the plane suddenly rolled sharply left to almost full inversion as the autopilot disengaged, and pitched nose down to near vertical. The BEA notes that "the recorded parameters indicate that there were no stall recovery manoeuvres by the crew", the flight control surface deflections remained those that would normally intend nose-up and right-roll. The BEA noted two previous similar incidents involving MD-82 and MD-83 aircraft, where the aircrews were alert enough to notice the loss of airspeed and intervene before loss of control. The first one was Spirit Airlines Flight 970. The aircraft involved, registered as N823NK, was an MD-82 flying at noon in June 2002 when it suffered a loss of thrust on both engines, in cruise at an altitude of 33,000 feet (10,000 m). The two pressure sensors, located on the engine nose bullets, were blocked by ice crystals, leading to incorrect indications and over-estimation of the EPR. The crew noticed the drop in speed and precursor indications of a stall just before disengagement of the autopilot and put the aeroplane into a descent. They had not activated the engine anti-ice systems. The second one involved was an MD-83 operated by Swiftair that occurred in June 2014. The crew was aware of the drop in airspeed and successfully recovered.

=== Logbook analysis ===
The French BEA revealed that there were several technical defects on the plane, several of which were on the EPR system. On 21 July 2013, BEA noted that there was intermittent failures on the autothrottle that led to the replacement of the EPR transmitter on No.2 engine. On 19 October 2013, the No.1 engine EPR indicator was faulty (no display of values) and the display was replaced. On 2 March 2014, the autothrottle actuator was replaced. During the recommissioning process, the "EPR LH" failure message was displayed. The left-hand EPR transmitter was replaced. Additionally, on 27 June 2014, an engine surge resulted in a rejected take off, at about 80 knots (150 km/h; 92 mph). Due to this, the No.1 engine was replaced.

=== Sequence of events based on flight data recorder analysis ===
The following was the sequence of events based on the FDR analysis: The crew had been prepared to fly to Algiers from Ouagadougou. Because the crew was flying to Algiers they should have known the weather condition in the area. The crew had arrived in Ouagadougou one hour earlier, and knew about the weather in the region. Therefore, they already knew the risks of turbulence and icing. After handling the ground clearance, AH5017 took off from Ouagadougou at 01:15 local time (same time as UTC). There were no incidents in the initial climb.

Thirteen minutes after takeoff, while climbing through flight level 215 (21,500 feet or 6,600 metres), outside temperature 9 °C (48 °F), AH5017 slightly deviated to the left to avoid a storm in the area, which they reported to Ouagadougou ACC. However, even though they knew of the storm, the flight crews did not activate the engine anti-icing system. The temperature in the area indicated a high risk of icing. According to procedures, the engine anti-ice system should have been activated below 10 °C (50 °F). Ice crystals may be difficult to visually detect, especially at night, and are not detectable on weather radar, plus the absence of significant turbulence, may have caused the crew to think that activating the engine anti-icing system was not necessary.

The plane levelled off at at FL310 (31,000 ft or 9,400 m) at 01:37, the temperature was −5 °C (23 °F), the autopilot and autothrottle were already engaged. Two minutes later the speed of the plane increased. The crew then selected the cruise thrust regime on the TRP (thrust rating panel).

Shortly after, the EPR (engine pressure ratio) values of the right engine became erroneous, probably due to ice crystals obstructing its pressure sensor. The autothrottle then adjusted the thrust to prevent the erroneous values from exceeding the EPR limit in cruise setting. The thrust delivered by the engines was then lower than the thrust required for level flight, and the speed of the plane continued to decrease. For about one minute, the gap between the EPR values of the left and right engines gradually increased and then stabilized between 0.2 and 0.3, and the autothrottle switched to MACH ATL mode three times. 55 seconds after the anomaly in the right engine, the left engine's EPR values also became erroneous and started to increase. Due to these incorrect readings, the crew realized that an anomaly had occurred. Five seconds later, and continuing for four seconds, this increase was interrupted by a decrease in both engines' RPM. This decrease could have resulted from the crew reducing the Mach target, or from manual decrease in engine RPM by over-riding the autothrottle. However, even though there were many anomalies in the engines, the speed of the plane was still at or near normal speed cruising, so the crew still did not activate the engine anti-icing system. They did not realize that the blockage in the pressure sensors was causing the engines to deliver insufficient thrust. The engine RPM then increased again until the erroneous left EPR values reached EPR limit. The thrust delivered by the engines remained lower than the thrust required in this phase of flight and the plane continued to decelerate. The gap between the right EPR and the left EPR became closer to the typical EPR values while in cruise. The N1 values were slightly lower than the typical cruise values (77% instead of 80 – 85%). The inconsistency between the EPR values and N1 values was therefore hardly noticeable to the crew, more so since their documentation did not have a table of correct actions between EPR and N1 and they had not been trained to observe the correct action between these two parameters. Additionally, the flight crew was busy trying to avoid a nearby storm system and trying to contact Niamey.

AH5017's speed then decreased further to 210 knots (390 km/h; 240 mph), nearly to its stall speed. The Mach indicator needle was close to vertical, and such a reading should have been noticed by the flight crew, who then should have put the plane into a descent. However, they only made an input on the thrust lever. This was the correct action when there was a problem with the EPR system, but this action alone was not the reaction expected of a crew in an approach to stall. They should have put the aircraft into a descent. They did notice that there was a problem in AH5017's EPR. The autothrottle then disengaged, at a speed of 203 knots (376 km/h; 234 mph). The "SPEED LOW" warning then appeared on the cockpit screen but the flight crew were slow to react because they were handling contact with Niamey ACC. At this point, the autopilot was still engaged.

When the speed reached 200 knots (370 km/h; 230 mph), the stick shaker triggered, followed three seconds later by the stall warning. From this time onwards, Captain Comerón's side loudspeaker only broadcast the "STALL" warning, while that on First Officer Gost's side alternated the "STALL" warning with the other warnings that were active. When a stall happens, the crew should disconnect the autopilot and execute the stall recovery procedure. Neither actions were taken by the crew, indicating that they did not know that a stall had happened in-flight. In order to maintain altitude, the autopilot then commanded a continuous nose-up movement of the trimmable horizontal stabilizer and the elevators. This resulted in an increase in the angle of attack of up to 24°, or 13° above the stall angle of attack in the event conditions, as well as the broadcast of several "STABILIZER MOTION" warnings. Both engines suffered a surge probably due to the plane's high angle of attack, their RPMs decreased to values close to idle. This surge may have been noticed by the crew. There was no sign of a reaction by the crew other than the throttle movements, until the disconnection of the autopilot which occurred 25 seconds after the triggering of the stick shaker. The speed was then 162 knots (300 km/h; 186 mph), and the altitude had decreased by about 1,150 feet (350 m). The plane was banking to the left and its pitch was decreasing. The crew applied input mainly to roll to the right to bring the wings level. At the same time they applied mainly nose up inputs, contrary to the inputs required to recover from a stall, and continued to do so until impact with the ground.

=== Conclusion ===
On 22 April 2016, the Malian Commission of Inquiry finally concluded the cause of the crash as follows: "The aeroplane speed, piloted by the autothrottle, decreased due to the obstruction of the pressure sensors located on the engine nose cones, probably caused by ice crystals. The autopilot then gradually increased the angle of attack to maintain altitude until the aeroplane stalled. The stall was not recovered. The aeroplane retained a pitch-down attitude and left bank down to the ground, while the control surfaces remained deflected pitch up and in the direction of a bank to the right. The aeroplane hit the ground at high vertical speed."

Contributing factors:

- the non-activation of the engine anti-icing systems
- the obstruction of the Pt2 pressure sensors, probably by ice crystals, generating erroneous EPR values that caused the autothrottle to limit the thrust produced by the engines to a level below that required to maintain the aeroplane at FL310.
- the crew's late reaction to the decrease in speed and to the erroneous EPR values, possibly linked to the work load associated with avoiding the convective zone and communication difficulties with air traffic control.
- the crew's lack of reaction to the appearance of buffet, the stickshaker and the stall warning.
- the lack of appropriate inputs on the flight controls to recover from a stall situation.
- The FCOM procedure relating to the activation of the anti-icing systems that was not adapted to Pt2 pressure sensor obstruction by ice crystals
- Insufficient information for operators on the consequences of a blockage of the Pt2 pressure sensor by icing
- The stickshaker and the stall warning triggering logic that led these devices to be triggered belatedly in relation to the aeroplane stall in cruise;
- the autopilot logic that enables it to continue to give pitch-up commands beyond the stall angle, thereby aggravating the stall situation and increasing the crew's difficulties in recovery.

The Malian Commission of Inquiry and the BEA jointly issued more than 20 recommendations in response to the crash, several of them noted on past aviation accidents, including West Caribbean Airways Flight 708, Air France Flight 447, and a serious incident onboard Spirit Airlines Flight 970. Some of the recommendations were based on Search and Rescue operations, CVR malfunctions, and an "urgent" recommendation to the FAA about icing on aircraft.

== Legal actions ==
Prosecutors in Paris opened a preliminary "involuntary homicide" investigation. Relatives of Canadian victims filed a lawsuit, at the Montreal Courthouse, to Air Algérie in response to the crash. The lawsuit alleges that Swiftair pilots intentionally chose a flight path that passed through the eye of a tropical storm. It also alleges the pilots failed to perform necessary measures to try to fly the plane to safety, including activating the plane's de-icing mechanisms. Victims' relatives were claiming moral, psychological and traumatic damages, as well as financial loss and the "loss of a loved one".

French newspaper Le Figaro cited a judicial probe that the crash of Flight 5017 was caused due to a series of errors, caused by the failure of the de-icing equipment on the plane. Based on the probe, the failure led to sensors on the engines becoming clogged with ice and reporting back false data to the pilots. As such, when the engine began to lose thrust, the pilots were unaware of it. The situation would have been compounded when the pilot attempted to regain altitude by pulling back on the joystick, indicating pilot error. The flight simulator system used to train the crew was not exactly the same as the actual plane, the MD-83. The pilots did not have any experience at flying in Africa's meteorological conditions. In the latter, it stated that both pilots had only one African flight experience. The crew also had outdated information on the weather conditions on the route they were flying, having received their last update 2½ hours before takeoff, while the plane's crews had trouble communicating with ground staff.

=== Referral to trial and procedural delays (2017–2025) ===
On 18 May 2021, the Paris Judicial Court ordered that Swiftair be tried in France on charges of involuntary manslaughter and negligence. The investigating judges concluded that the company had failed to provide "adequate training to the crew," which contributed to "the crew's failure to recognize the deterioration of engine parameters" and "their inadequate response to the onset of the stall."

The trial was initially scheduled from October 2 to 26, 2023, pending a favourable decision on 8 June 2023. This was due to the fact that the Spanish justice system had previously issued a provisional dismissal in favour of the company, raising the potential applicability of the legal principle of ne bis in idem, which prohibits being tried twice for the same offence.

However, in June 2023, the trial was postponed indefinitely because the Paris Criminal Court submitted preliminary questions to the Court of Justice of the European Union (CJEU). The families of the victims, frustrated by this new delay, denounced the slowness of the judicial process.

The French association of families of the victims of Flight AH5017, AH5017 Ensemble, expressed its frustration regarding the postponement of the trial against Swiftair, denouncing the slowness of the judicial procedures and continuing to demand justice for their deceased relatives.

On 3 April 2025, the CJEU issued a decision declaring inadmissible the preliminary questions submitted by the Paris Criminal Court in the proceedings against Swiftair (case C-701/23). The questions specifically concerned the applicability of the ne bis in idem principle, following the provisional dismissal Swiftair had obtained in Spain. By declaring the request inadmissible, the CJEU did not rule on the substance of the invoked principle, thus leaving open the possibility of continuing the proceedings in France.

In November 2025, the Paris Criminal Court rejected a further attempt by Swiftair to refer new preliminary questions to the CJEU, ruling there was "no concrete link" between the case and European law. Hearings were then set to run from 9 March to 2 April 2026.

=== Trial opening (March 2026) ===
The trial opened on 9 March 2026 before the Paris Criminal Court, nearly twelve years after the crash. Swiftair, a Madrid-based charter airline founded in 1986 and operating a fleet of around 50 aircraft, faces charges of involuntary manslaughter through negligence and recklessness. The defence is represented by lawyers Rachel Lindon and Louis Falgas. The victims' associations AH5017-Ensemble and Fenvac are joined as civil parties, represented by Maître Sébastien Busy.

At the opening hearing, Swiftair vice-president Fernando Llorens offered condolences to the victims' families and declared the company was "convinced that a lack of respect for regulations cannot be attributed to Swiftair." The defence raised two procedural objections: the ne bis in idem principle (on the grounds of the Spanish provisional dismissal) and the prescription of the criminal action. The court decided to examine both objections alongside the substance of the case at the conclusion of the hearings.

Swiftair argued that the accident resulted not from inadequate training but from a combination of external factors, including shortcomings in the aircraft flight manual regarding ice crystal icing, and insufficient guidance from Boeing and the European Union Aviation Safety Agency (EASA) on the type of stall that occurred.

== Tribute ==
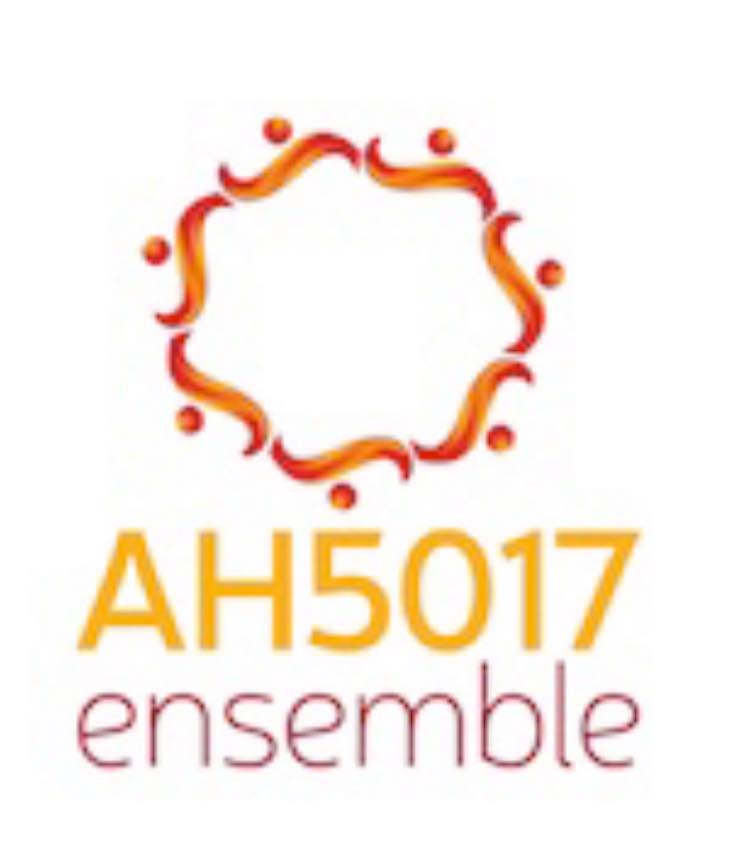
Logo of the French association AH5017-Ensemble

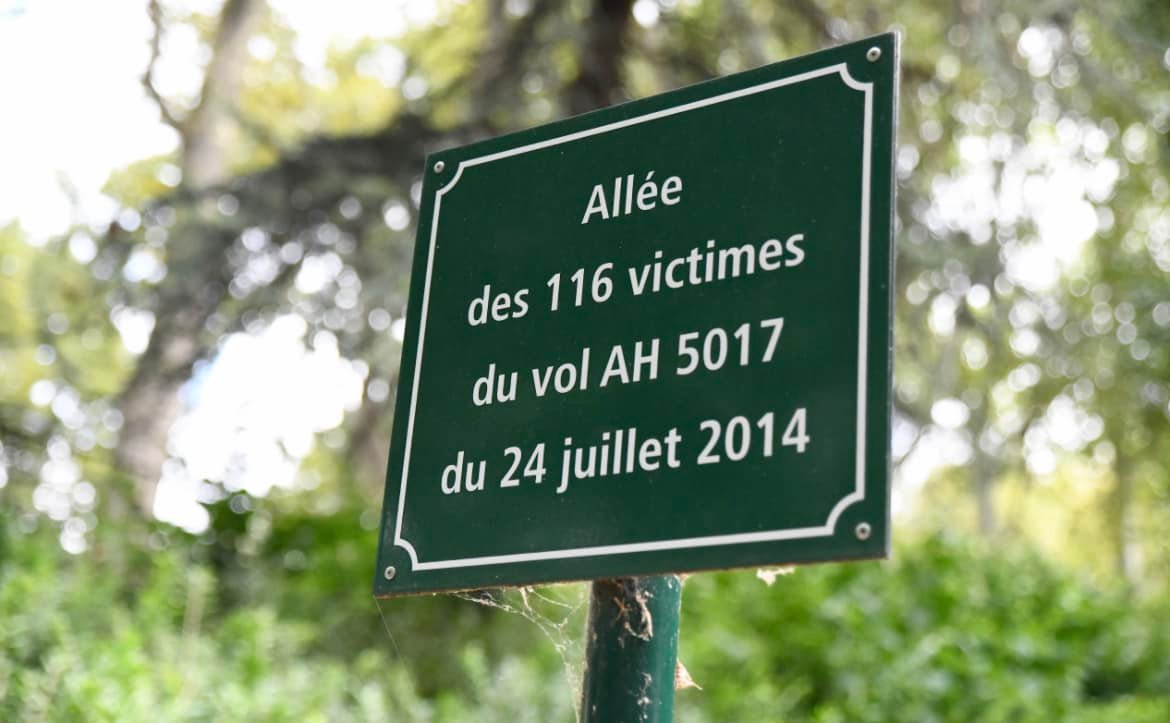
Memorial plate in Paris, France

The Mairie de Paris has paid tribute to the victims of the crash by inaugurating a memorial in the Parc de Bercy named "allée des 116 victimes du vol AH5017 du 24 juillet 2014" in 2019.

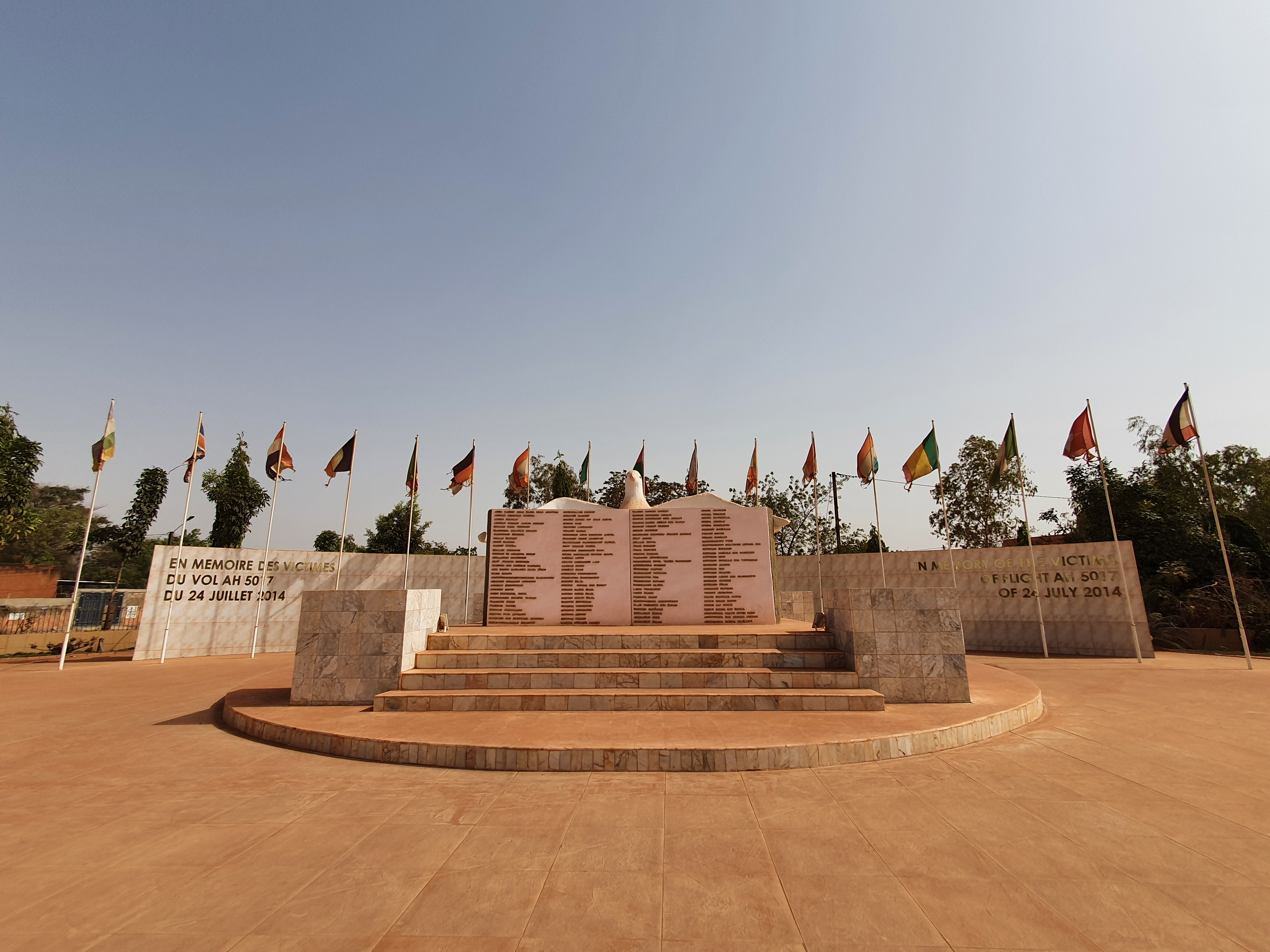
Memorial in Ouagadougou, Burkina Faso

On July 24, 2018, on the fourth anniversary of the crash of Air Algérie flight 5017, a memorial was inaugurated in Ouagadougou, Burkina Faso, in tribute to the 116 victims of the tragedy. The ceremony was attended by then President Roch Marc Christian Kaboré, and then mayor of Ouagadougou Armand Béouindé. Another was installed near the crash site in Mali.

In Burkina Faso, the Association des Familles des Victimes du Crash (AFAVIC) continues to commemorate the tragedy. In July 2023 and again in July 2024, on the tenth anniversary of the accident, AFAVIC expressed its sorrow and remembrance in a press release, although the planned commemorative activities were postponed. The association also appealed to customary and religious authorities for the eternal repose of the deceased.

=== Victims' associations ===
The French association AH5017-Ensemble groups the families of the French victims. Its president, Suzanne Aillot, stated at the opening of the trial in March 2026 that she hoped the proceedings would allow "the results of the expert reports, the investigations, and the instruction" to be presented in open court, adding that she hoped "the truth will emerge" so as to "identify the responsibilities of each party." The association maintains a documented legal case archive at the memorial website ah5017.com.

The Burkinabé association AFAVIC (Association des Familles des Victimes du Crash) represents the families of the 28 Burkinabé victims. Its president, Maître Halidou Ouédraogo, stated at the opening of the trial that "the tragedy remains intimate and painful" twelve years on, and that Burkinabé families would follow the proceedings through the press due to a lack of resources to ensure representation in Paris. He also declared: "We no longer want Africa to become a dumping ground where planes in poor condition are sent."

== See also ==
- Agence Nationale de l'Aviation Civile du Mali
- Atmospheric icing
- Ice protection system
- List of accidents and incidents involving commercial aircraft
- List of aircraft accidents and incidents resulting in at least 50 fatalities

Similar incidents

- 2000 Marsa Brega Shorts 360 crash
- Air Florida Flight 90
- Air Ontario Flight 1363
- American Eagle Flight 4184
- Comair Flight 3272
- West Caribbean Airways Flight 708
- USAir Flight 405
- Air France Flight 447
