= 1985 Air Mali Antonov An-24 crash =

1985 aviation accident in Mali

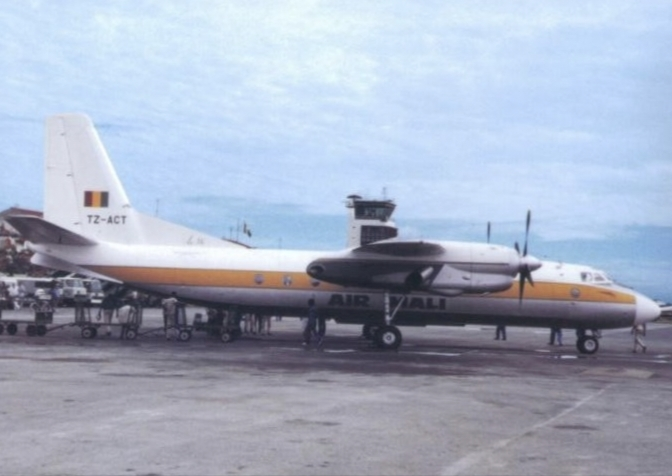
- TZ-ACT, the aircraft involved in the accident, pictured in 1972

Accident
- Date: 22 February 1985
- Summary: Crashed whilst returning to the airport following an engine failure on takeoff
- Site: Near Timbuktu Airport, Timbuktu, Mali; 16°44′32″N 2°58′56″W

Aircraft
- Aircraft type: Antonov An-24V
- Operator: Air Mali
- Registration: TZ-ACT
- Flight origin: Gao International Airport, Gao, Mali
- 1st stopover: Timbuktu Airport, Timbuktu, Mali
- Destination: Mopti Airport, Sévaré, Mali
- Occupants: 52
- Passengers: 46
- Crew: 6
- Fatalities: 51
- Injuries: 1
- Survivors: 1

On 22 February 1985, an Air Mali Antonov An-24V operating a domestic flight in Mali from to Gao International Airport, Gao, to Mopti Airport, Sévaré, crashed on takeoff from Timbuktu Airport, Timbuktu, where the flight had a stopover, after suffering from an engine failure in a sandstorm. Of the 52 occupants on board, 51 were killed, including Attaher Maïga, a former Malian member of parliament and minister, and 13 foreign nationals, most of whom of were United Nations humanitarian workers. The crash temporarily halted flights to Timbuktu.

== Aircraft ==
The aircraft involved was an Antonov An-24V registered as TZ-ACT with MSN: 87304104. It was manufactured in 1968 in the Soviet Union. It had Ivchenko AI-24 engines.

== Accident ==
The aircraft operated by Air Mali was scheduled to fly a domestic route in Mali from Gao International Airport to Mopti Airport, with an intermediate stopover at Timbuktu Airport. About two minutes after takeoff, the aircraft suffered an engine failure after the engine reportedly caught fire and exploded. The crew attempted to perform an emergency landing at the airport. However, the aircraft crashed in the Sahara about 2 kilometres (1.2 mi) east of the runway. It burned down after two hours. There were 52 people on board, including 46 passengers and 6 crew members, with 51 of the occupants being killed. The sole survivor, a Malian citizen, was hospitalized in serious condition.

== Victims ==
Nationality	Count
Algeria	1
Belgium	1
France	1
Italy	1
France	1
Mali	39
Netherlands	3
United States	3
Total (8 nationalities)	52

Of the 51 victims of the crash, 38 were Malian and 13 were from other countries. Of the 13 foreign passengers, which included three Americans, three Dutch, a Belgian, an Italian, a French and an Algerian, most were workers of United Nations humanitarian programmes active in the area, such as the United Nations Development Programme. The three Dutch people were first named to be people of the United Nations: two business people and a volunteer of the UNICEF programm.

Former Malian politician Attaher Maïga was killed in the crash. He was a member of parliament in the late 1950s and later served as finance minister and afterwards as trade minister. He served under the presidency of Modibo Keïta.

== Aftermath ==
Access and communication was hampered at the time of the accident due to violent sandstorms that had raged for 10 days in the Sahara. An embassy delegation was not able to reach the crash site soon due to the severe weather conditions.

The scheduled flight was the only commercial flight to Timbuktu. By 3 September 1985, flights had not resumed.

Following this accident the debts of Air Mali increased. It followed that the government was forced to close down the airline in 1988. The operations Air Mali was taken over by Malitas in 1989.
