= Air Dabia =

Mali airline which flew between 1996 and 1999

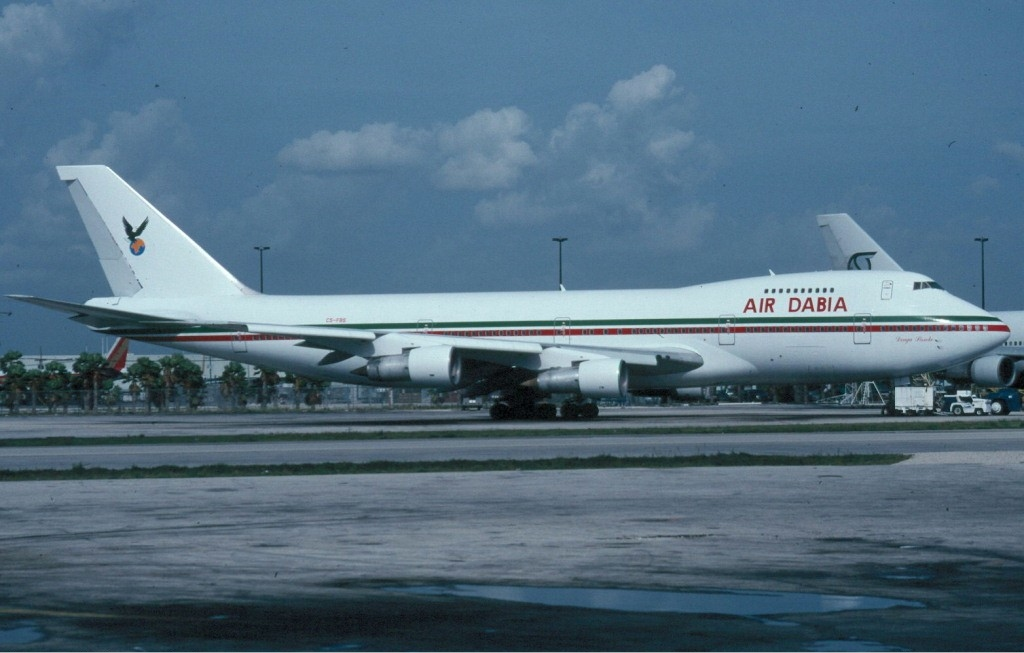
- Air Dabia 747, C5-FBS, at Miami Airport in 1999.
IATA	ICAO	Call sign
YM	DBG	—
- Founded: 1996, 30 years ago
- Ceased operations: 1998
- Focus cities: Bamako; Brazzaville; Jeddah (for Mecca)
- Fleet size: 3
- Key people: Babani Sissoko

Air Dabia was a short-lived Mali airline which flew between 1996 and 1998; it had a three-ship fleet (one Boeing 747, notable as being the airframe involved in the United Airlines Flight 811 decompression incident, and two Boeing 727 aircraft). It was run by alleged fraudster Foutanga Babani Sissoko, whose conspicuous personal wealth had suspicious origins. In its short period of operation, there were allegations from numerous employees of excessive hours, improper rest provisions for crews (being expected to sleep on aircraft between trips) and pay discrepancies.

== History ==
In 1995, an African friend introduced Zaire-born driving school instructor Rene Dubois (who was living in Upstate New York at the time) to Foutanga Babani Sissoko who was attempting to launch an airline to be called Air Dabia. Sissoko immediately hired Dubois to be manager of Air Dabia, and furnished him with lavish gifts.

From New York City, Sissoko flew back to Africa in March 1996, distributing large checks to strangers at John F. Kennedy International Airport.

In late July 1996, Serge Comminges and Moumouni Dieguimde, two Air Dabia employees, were sent to Miami to buy two helicopters. They acquired two Bell Huey helicopters from South Florida Aviation Investments in Opa-locka for $135,000 each.

Over the next several days, the two sped around South Florida trying to find a shipping company to send the helicopters to Africa immediately. According to Jim Robinson, the owner of South Florida Aviation Investments, their frantic actions caught the attention of U.S. Customs and Border Protection. He added that they behaved strangely and were "making jokes about how they were going to overthrow various governments in Africa and shit like that." Refusing to wait for the necessary export license to be issued from the U.S. Department of State, Comminges and Dieguimde loaded the helicopters onto a cargo plane at Miami International Airport.

=== Downfall ===
On the night of August 16, 1996, Customs and Border Protection agents raided the plane and seized the Bell Hueys. Dieguimde was introduced to Special Agent Jeffrey Outlaw, who was in charge of the case. Dieguimde promised (in a call secretly recorded by Customs and Border Protection) to reward Outlaw, offering him a free vacation at Sissoko's resort in the Gambia, if he would release the helicopters. On the night of August 23, three Air Dabia employees, including Comminges and Dieguimde, met with Outlaw in the parking lot of the Hilton Miami Airport Blue Lagoon hotel to deliver $5,000 as a down payment for the $30,000 they had promised Outlaw. Sissoko himself was careful never to promise the agent any money, claiming that he did not want to break the law.

By the last few days of August Sissoko was in Switzerland, preparing to fly to Washington, D.C. for a dinner party with President Bill Clinton. Sissoko had been invited by John Catsimatidis, who had sold him two jetliners and hoped Sissoko would donate to the Democratic Party. However, he was arrested in Geneva by Interpol in late August, and fought his extradition for two months, until he was extradited to Miami.

== Destinations ==
Air Dabia transported pilgrims from Mali to Mecca, and Malian refugees from Brazzaville, Republic of the Congo.

The airline's sole Boeing 747, C5-FBS, was abandoned at Plattsburgh International Airport in Upstate New York and scrapped at the airport in 2004.

== See also ==
- List of defunct airlines of Mali
- Transport in Mali
