= Foutanga Babani Sissoko =

Malian swindler, entrepreneur, and politician (died 2021)

- Born: Dabia, Mali
- Died: March 2021

Foutanga Babani Sissoko, known as Baba Sora (died March 2021) was a Malian entrepreneur and politician. Sissoko was a member of the National Assembly between 2002 and 2014.

He was born in the village of Dabia, to the west of Mali's capital, Bamako. Little is known of Sissoko's early life.

He was said to have swindled the Dubai Islamic Bank for US$242 million using claims he could perform black magic, a claim he denied saying he only went into the bank to receive a car loan. He could do it with the help of the bank manager, Mohammed Ayoub. From 1995 to 1998, Ayoub made 183 transfers into Sissoko's accounts around the world. With the money obtained from the bank, Sissoko could fulfill "his dream of opening an airline for West Africa". A used Hawker-Siddeley 125 and a pair of old Boeing 727s were the first airplanes he bought. In this way he founded Air Dabia, named after his native village.

In 1996, Sissoko was arrested for trying to buy two Huey helicopters for Gambia. Because they could "be refitted as gunships", it was necessary to obtain a special export licence. Sissoko's men tried to circumvent this and offered a $30,000 bribe to a customs officer. They were arrested and Interpol issued a warrant for Sissoko's arrest too. Sissoko was arrested in Geneva, where he tried to open a new bank account. Sissoko was quickly extradited to the US, where he mobilised influential supporters. Among his defence team was the former US Senator Birch Bayh. The US government wanted "Sissoko held in custody, but he was bailed" for US$20 million. He was prosecuted for paying an illegal gratuity and served 43 days in jail and paid a $250,000 fine.

After serving only half this sentence, he was given "early release in return for a $1 million payment to a homeless shelter," to serve the rest of his sentence under the house arrest in Mali. At this time Ayoub confessed taking money from the Dubai bank; he was arrested and sentenced to three years for fraud in jail. From 2002 to 2014 Sissoko was a member of Parliament in Mali which gave him immunity from prosecution. It is also alleged that he was ordered to undergo an exorcism to "cure him of black magic".

In the late 1990s, Sissoko made plans to construct a large hotel in Bamako, on the north bank of the Niger River. The structure was never finished, however, owing to Sissoko's financial and legal woes; the site was purchased by Libyan investors in 2007 and renamed the Afriqiyah Hotel. Following the downfall of Libyan leader Mu'amar al-Kadafi in 2011, construction was again halted. The site was subsequently purchased by Moroccan investors, but as of 2019 it remained unfinished.
