= Pressure ratio =

Pressure ratio may refer to:

- Compression ratio, for piston engines
- Engine pressure ratio, for jet engines
- Overall pressure ratio, for gas turbine engines
- Pressure ratio, the compression ratio of a gas compressor
