= Kéniéba Airport =

Airport in Mali

Kéniéba Airport Aéroport de Kéniéba
- IATA: KNZ; ICAO: GAKA

Summary
- Airport type: Public
- Serves: Kéniéba, Mali
- Elevation AMSL: 449 ft / 137 m
- Coordinates: 12°50′21″N 11°15′10″W

Map
- Location of Kéniéba Airport in Mali

Runways
Direction	Length		Surface
Direction	m	ft	Surface
	1,200	3,937

Kéniéba Airport (IATA: KNZ, ICAO: GAKA) (French: Aéroport de Kéniéba) is an airport serving Kéniéba, a city in the Kéniéba, a city and commune of the Kéniéba Cercle in the Kayes Region of Mali.

The airport is at an elevation of 449 feet (137 m) above mean sea level. It has one runway that is 900 metres (2,953 ft) long.
