= List of airlines of Mali =

This is a list of airlines currently operating in Mali:

== Scheduled airlines ==
Airline	Image	IATA	ICAO	Callsign	Commenced operations	Notes
Sahel Aviation Service						
Sky Mali		ML	FML		2020	
Tombouctou Aviation			TBA		2008	

== Defunct airlines ==
Airline	Image	IATA	ICAO	Callsign	Commenced operations	Ceased operations	Notes
Air Mali (1960–89)		MY	AIM	-	1960	1985	
Air Mali (1993)		L9	MLI	-	1993	2001	
Air Mali (2005)		I5	CMM	CAMALI	2009	2012	
Air Mali International		XG	KLB	-	2002	2003	
CAM - Compagnie Aérienne du Mali		I5	CMM	-	2005	2009	Rebranded as Air Mali
Douniah Airlines		DH	DTS	-	2012	2014	
Mali Air Express			VXP	-	2001	2020	
Mali Air Transport				-	2008	2009	
SAM Intercontinental			MMT		2008	2020	
STA Trans African Airlines		T8	SBA	-	2002	2005	
Transair Mali			TSM	-	1991	1995	

== See also ==
- List of airports in Mali
