= Attaher Maïga =

Malian politician (1924–1985)

- Attaher Maïga in 1959

1st Minister of Finance
- In office 16 April 1959 – 14 May 1964

Minister of Finance and Commerce
- In office 14 May 1964 – 16 September 1964

Minister of Finance
- In office 16 September 1964 – 15 September 1966

Minister of Commerce
- In office 15 September 1966 – 19 November 1968

Personal details
- Born: 1924 Baria, Bourem Cercle, Mali
- Died: 22 February 1985 (aged 61) Timbuktu, Mali
- Spouse: Jeannette Haïdara (m. 1948)
- Children: 11, including Suzanne Konaté and Keïta Aminata

Attaher Maïga (1924 – 22 February 1985) was a Malian politician and cabinet minister who served as the minister of finance, of finance and commerce, and of commerce from 1959 to 1968. Born in the village of Baria, he graduated in 1943 in finance. Before working in the Malian government, Maïga first worked as a civil servant in Ségou, participating in community and union-related activities. He was first arrested in 1953 and punished after taking part in a labor strike. Joining the Sudanese Union – African Democratic Rally, he became Ségou's territorial councilor in addition to being a member of French Sudan's Legislative Assembly.

From 1959, Maïga started working in the government as the Minister of Finance, then becoming the Minister of Finance and Commerce, again the Minister of Finance, and finally as the Minister of Commerce. During his time in office, he oversaw the creation of the Malian franc and contributed to the hiring of people from the country's northern communities.

Following the 1968 Malian coup d'état by the military, as president Modibo Keïta was deposed, numerous members of the government were arrested, including Maïga. Jailed for seven years, he was released in 1975 but again arrested in 1977 after attending Keïta's funeral. He was released six months later, subsequently returning to Baria. He died on 22 February 1985 in Timbuktu, Mali, in a plane crash at the age of 61.

== Biography ==
=== Early and personal life ===
Attaher Maïga was born in 1924 in Baria, Bourem Cercle, into a family of the village's Songhai chieftaincy. Following studies in Bourem, Maïga then likely joined Terrasson de Fougères Higher Primary School of Bamako, graduating in 1940 with a higher primary school diploma. He then entered the William Ponty School in Dakar, Senegal, graduating in 1943. (Note: According to Marianne Saddier in Le Maitron, Maïga graduated in 1943 from the administration section. According to Bamada.net, Maïga instead graduated from the school in finance.)

He married Jeannette Haïdara in 1948, a teacher and activist. He was the father of 11 children, including Suzanne Konaté Maïga who served as Mali's secretary of state for social action and the promotion of women, and Keïta Aminata Maiga who served as the First Lady of Mali.

=== Career ===
Maïga first worked as a civil servant. In 1944, Maïga was appointed as a Treasury accountant at the Pay Office in Ségou, a city where most of his political and professional career was spent. He then became the president of a sports association and the treasurer of a union as part of his roles in community and union-related activities. In 1953, he participated in a labor strike and was subsequently arrested; he was punished by the Governor of French Sudan for "serious breaches of discipline". As a result, after serving for 36 months at the Pay Office, he was suspended from his duties and had half his salary deducted.

In 1956, he started to work in the administrative secretariat. From March 1957, Maïga, a member of the Sudanese Union – African Democratic Rally (US–RDA), took the role of Ségou's territorial councilor. In addition, until April 1959, he was a member of French Sudan's Legislative Assembly.

Maïga started working for the Government of Mali when he served as the Minister of Finance from 16 April 1959 to 14 May 1964, becoming the first to occupy the post in post-independence Mali. During this time, he oversaw the creation of the Malian franc and its implementation, which was later put into circulation on 1 July 1962. He then became the Minister of Finance and Commerce from 14 May to 16 September 1964, and then the Minister of Finance from 16 September 1964 to 15 September 1966. Maïga leaned more towards the radical side of the US–RDA; although the party had no political presence in the Niger Bend, he was known in Bamako as a strong supporter of northern Malians, coming himself from Northern Mali, using his position in the government to help with the hirings of many of them, at a time when Mali's institutions were rapidly developing. He then served as the Minister of Commerce from 15 September 1966 until 19 November 1968, when Modibo Keïta was deposed following the 1968 Malian coup d'état.

Following the successful coup by the military, many US–RDA members and leaders of Keïta's government were jailed, with the US–RDA being banned. Despite his role in Mali's economy, Maïga was initially not arrested. However, he later turned himself in and asked to be with his comrades. He was sent to jail in Nioro, and then Kidal. (Note: According to Pascal James Imperato and Gavin H. Imperato in the Historical dictionary of Mali, he was released in 1974, only to be arrested later the same year due to "antigovernment activities" – the timing of his arrest corresponded to the promulgation of Mali's new constitution – and was later released in 1977.) He was detained for seven years and then released in June 1975, along with fourteen other political prisoners of Keïta's government. In 1977, he attended Keïta's funeral along with close associates of the latter. They were all later arrested again, with Maïga spending six months in jail at the Djicoroni paratrooper camp in Bamako. In November 1977, with the help of Amnesty International, Maïga, along with 32 other detainees were released – none of the 33 had faced a trial. After serving his time in jail, he returned to and retired at Baria and was involved in livestock farming, agriculture, and the education of girls.

=== Death and aftermath ===
On 22 February 1985, Maïga died in a plane crash in Timbuktu at the age of 61. The aircraft, an Antonov An-24 operated by Air Mali, was flying from Gao to Bamako via Timbuktu and Mopti, when it crashed after takeoff whilst attempting to return to the airport after reportedly experiencing an engine problem.

In April 2016, the Baria School celebrated its fiftieth anniversary, with the school bearing the name of Attaher Maïga.
