= 2023 Sévaré attack =

Attack in Mali which killed thirteen people

- Part of Mali War
Date	April 22, 2023
Location	Mopti Airport and MINUSMA base, Sévaré, Mopti Region, Mali
Result	Malian victory

Belligerents
Malian Army; MINUSMA	Katiba Macina

Casualties and losses
3 Malian soldiers killed	28 killed (per Mali)
- 10 civilians killed 60 injured

On April 22, 2023, jihadists from Katiba Macina launched a triple suicide bombing attack near a Malian military base in Sévaré, Mali, killing thirteen people and injuring 60 others.

== Background ==
Katiba Macina is a predominantly-Fulani jihadist militant group based in central Mali since 2015. The group is part of the al-Qaeda affiliated Jama'at Nasr al-Islam wal-Muslimin organization, which has waged an insurgency against the Malian government since the group's formation in 2017. JNIM has targeted Malian military bases in cities deep in government-controlled territory before, with attacks on MINUSMA bases in Timbuktu and Gao among other areas. In early 2023, the Malian junta ordered the withdrawal of MINUSMA, just a year after French troops left the country. JNIM used this vacancy to expand its reach.

== Bombing ==
The MINUSMA camp in Sevare is also a Malian military base, and is located right next to the Mopti Airport. Residents of Sevare said that the attack occurred around 5am, when they were going to morning prayers at the local mosque. Three car bombs went off near the airport, and MINUSMA reported that shots were fired toward the base. Senegalese soldiers from MINUSMA were involved in the clashes. The Malian government described the incident as a "complex attack", and in a statement claimed the attack had been stopped by drones. Later, they said 28 militants had been killed. Twenty buildings were damaged in the attack as well, including a gas station. Analyst Lassane Ouedraogo Wedraogo said that the perpetrators were likely targeting Wagner Group enlisted by the Malian army who were stationed at the military base in Sevare.

Ten civilians and three soldiers were killed, and over 60 others injured. The ICRC reported an increase in casualties around 8:30am at Somine Dolo Hospital. One of the dead civilians was a child.

No group claimed responsibility for the attack, but Katiba Macina operates around Sevare.
