= Kouroukoto =

- Commune and village
- Location in Mali
- Coordinates: 12°36′27″N 10°24′16″W
- Country: Mali
- Region: Kayes Region
- Cercle: Kéniéba Cercle

Population (2009 census)
  - Total: 7,980
- Time zone: UTC+0 (GMT)

Kouroukoto or Kroukoto is a village and rural commune in the Cercle of Kéniéba in the Kayes Region of south-western Mali. The commune includes 9 villages and at the time of 2009 census had a population of 7,980.
