= Suzanne Konaté Maïga =

Mariama Suzanne Konaté Maïga (born 1956) is a Mali medical doctor and public health administrator who served as Mali's secretary of state for social action and the promotion of women from 1991 to 92. She also worked for the United Nations Population Fund (c. 1993 – 2016).

== Early life, family and education ==
Suzanne Maïga was born in 1956 in Ségou, Mali, to Attaher Maïga, who served as the Malian finance minister (1959–66) and minister of commerce (1966–68). Her older sister, Keïta Aminata Maiga, was married to the former Malian president, Ibrahim Boubacar Keïta (1945–2022), and served as First Lady of Mali (2013–20).

Her medical degree is from the École Nationale de Médecine et de Pharmacie, Bamako (1979). Her other qualifications include a postgraduate diploma in public health from Pierre and Marie Curie University, Paris, and a World Health Organization certificate in epidemiology and disease control.

== Career ==
After working at Bamako's Centre for Family Health (1980–84), Maïga joined Mali's Direction Nationale de la Santé Publique (National Directorate of Public Health) in 1985, where she directed the epidemiology section (1985–87) and the family health division (1987–88). Her work there included coordinating control programmes for cholera and bilharzia, and examining the impact of the Sélingué Dam. She then directed the World Bank's operations in Burkina Faso and Togo (1988–90).

Maïga served as secretary of state for social action and the promotion of women ("l'Action sociale et à la Promotion féminine") from 27 December 1991 to 14 May 1992. After leaving office, Maïga married Hamidou Konaté, formerly the Malian minister of solidarity and humanitarian action. From around 1993 to 2016, Konaté Maïga worked for the United Nations Population Fund (UNFPA), the United Nations agency for reproductive health, as its representative in Equatorial Guinea, Cameroon, The Gambia, Senegal and Côte d'Ivoire, for example, drawing attention to the high risk of maternal mortality in Côte d'Ivoire. and the low uptake of contraception in Senegal.
