= Dombia =

- Commune and village
- Location in Mali
- Coordinates: 12°46′45″N 11°3′3″W
- Country: Mali
- Region: Kayes Region
- Cercle: Kéniéba Cercle

Population (2009 census)
  - Total: 6,178
- Time zone: UTC+0 (GMT)

Dombia is a village and rural commune in the Cercle of Kéniéba in the Kayes Region of south-western Mali. The commune includes 5 villages and in the 2009 census had a population of 6,178.
