= Timbuktu Airport =

Timbuktu Airport Aéroport de Tombouctou
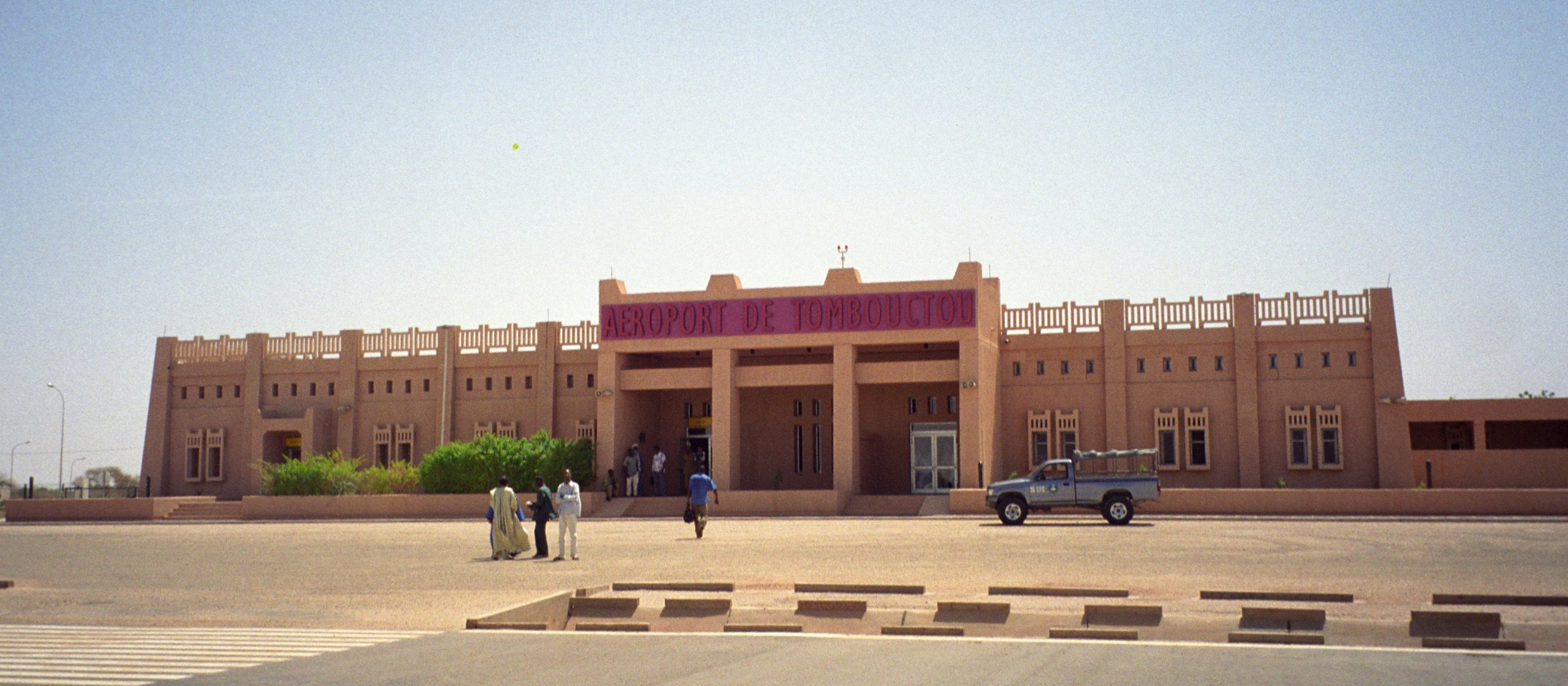
- IATA: TOM; ICAO: GATB

Summary
- Airport type: Public
- Location: Timbuktu, Mali
- Elevation AMSL: 863 ft (263 m)
- Coordinates: 16°43′50″N 003°00′27″W

Map
- Location of airport in Mali

Runways
| Direction | Length | | Surface |
| Direction | m | ft | Surface |
|---|---|---|---|
| 07/25 | 2,110 | 6,923 | Asphalt |

Timbuktu Airport (IATA: TOM, ICAO: GATB) is an airport in Timbuktu, Mali that opened on April 15, 1961.

== Airlines and destinations ==
The start of Sky Mali's service to Timbuktu in February 2021 marked the first commercial flights to the airport since the city was captured by jihadists in 2012.

| Airlines | Destinations |
|---|---|
| Sky Mali | Bamako, Mopti |

== Accidents and incidents ==
- On February 22, 1985, an Antonov An-24V (TZ-ACT) of Air Mali crashed around 3 km from here during initial climb on a flight to Mopti, killing all but 1 of the 52 occupants. The flight route was from Gao to Bamako, with Timbuktu and Mopti as stopovers. The crash was Mali's deadliest until Air Algerie Flight 5017 in 2014.
- On June 2, 2025, the airport was shelled during a coordinated attack on Timbuktu that left 60 soldiers dead and also targeted an army garrison.
