= 2023 Gao Ilyushin Il-76 crash =

Aviation accident in Mali

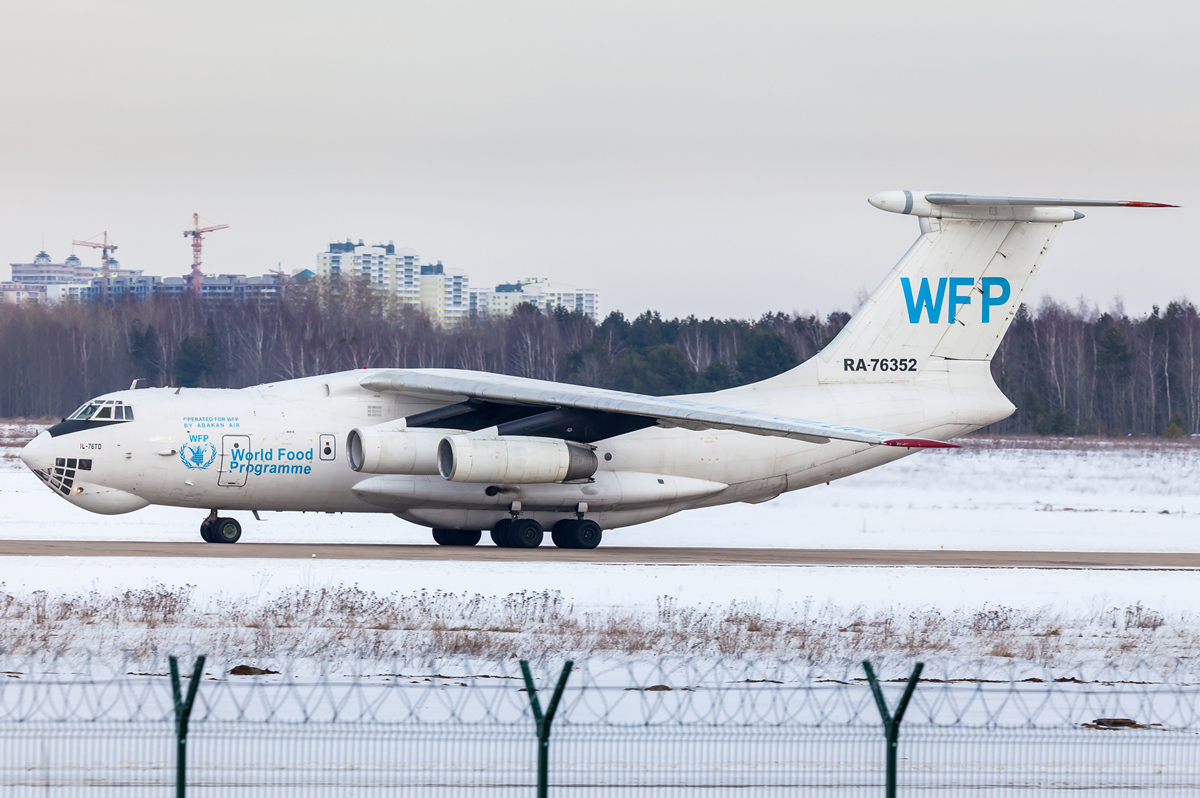
- TZ-98T, the Ilyushin Il-76TD involved in the accident, pictured under a previous registration in 2016

Accident
- Date: 23 September 2023
- Summary: Crashed after runway excursion for reasons currently unknown
- Site: Gao International Airport, Gao, Mali

Aircraft
- Aircraft type: Ilyushin Il-76TD
- Operator: Malian Air Force
- Registration: TZ-98T
- Occupants: Unknown
- Passengers: Unknown
- Crew: 7 (unofficial)
- Fatalities: Unknown
- Survivors: 0

On 23 September 2023, an Ilyushin Il-76 military transport aircraft crashed at Gao International Airport, Mali, after overrunning the runway. The crash reportedly killed an unknown number of people.

== Aircraft ==
The aircraft involved in the accident was an Ilyushin Il-76 strategic airlifter. In the immediate aftermath of the crash it was unclear by whom the aircraft was operated. Speculation that the aircraft was operating on behalf of the United Nations' MINUSMA peacekeeping mission was denied by the UN in a statement given to German newspaper Frankfurter Allgemeine Zeitung.

Local journalists initially reported that the aircraft was operated by Belarusian airline Rubystar Airways, either on behalf of the Malian Armed Forces or the Russian Wagner Group private military company, with some outlets stating that the aircraft involved in the crash was carrying the registration EW-412TH. Later reports suggested that the aircraft was operated directly by the Malian Air Force with the registration TZ-98T.

== Crash ==
The aircraft crashed on the 2,500 metres (8,200 ft) long runway 06L at Gao International Airport, after landing too far down the runway. The aircraft then broke into several parts and caught on fire.

It has not been confirmed how many passengers were on the aircraft, only 7 crew members were confirmed to be on board. Though the exact number of casualties remains unclear, it is speculated that the aircraft's Russian pilot and a Malian lieutenant colonel were amongst the fatalities of the crash.

== Affiliation with Wagner Group ==
The aircraft was reportedly affiliated with the Wagner Group(unconfirmed) and was believed to be carrying Malian soldiers and members of the PMC. The Telegram account "Grey Zone", which is affiliated with the Wagner Group, denied that there were any PMC members on board at the time of the crash. It is speculated that the aircraft was previously owned by the Wagner Group and then transferred to the Malian Air Force a week before the crash.

== See also ==
- 2023 Wagner Group plane crash
- Air Algérie Flight 5017
