= Keïta Aminata Maiga =

Malian healthcare and children's advocate

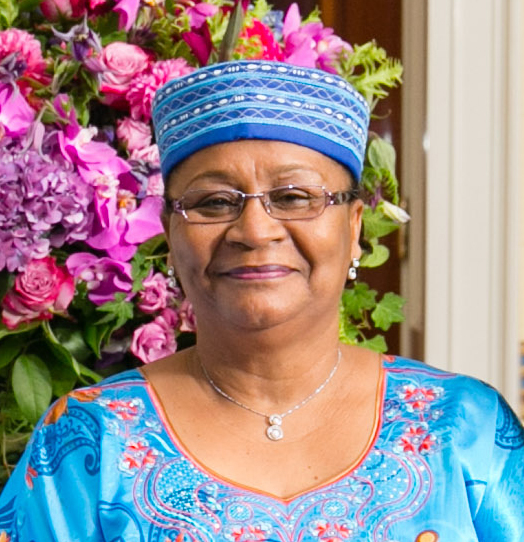

First Lady of Mali
- In office 4 September 2013 – 19 August 2020
- President: Ibrahim Boubacar Keïta
- Preceded by: Mintou Doucour
- Succeeded by: Lala Diallo

Personal details
- Born: Aminata Maiga before 1960; Bourem, French Sudan (now Mali)
- Spouse: Ibrahim Boubacar Keïta

Keïta Aminata Maiga, also known as Aminata Maïga Keïta, is a Malian healthcare, public health, and children's advocate, and the widow of former President Ibrahim Boubacar Keïta. Under this capacity, she served as the First Lady of Mali from 4 September 2013 until 19 August 2020. During her tenure as first lady, Maiga has promoted improvements in healthcare, education, the welfare of mothers and children, the environment and athletics. Maiga, an opponent of child marriage, launched a national campaign in October 2015 to end the practice in Mali.

== Biography ==
Maiga is originally from the commune of Bourem in the Gao Region of northern Mali. Her father, Attaher Maïga, served as a government minister under President Modibo Keïta during the 1960s. Her sister, Suzanne Konaté Maïga, is a public health administrator who served as secretary of state for social action and the promotion of women. Aminata Maiga studied at the University of Nantes in France.

Maiga oversaw the donation of more than 30 million CFA francs worth of sanitation equipment to the city of Ségou as part of a clean-up campaign called l'Opération Ségou Commune Propre (Operation Ségou Clean Commune). Additional sanitation equipment was also donated to the southern city of Sikasso under the first lady.

During the mid-2010s, the West African Ebola virus epidemic in neighboring Guinea and Liberia posed a major risk to public health in Mali. First Lady Aminata Maiga launched an ebola awareness campaign aimed at school children, called "Ecole contre Ebola" (School Against Ebola) to prevent the potential spread of the disease.

On October 11, 2015, First Lady Keïta Aminata Maiga launched a national campaign, called "Education for girls, a means to eliminating early child marriage," to end the practice of child marriage in Mali. Maiga unveiled the initiative, which is supported by the African Union, at an announcement in the town of Konobougou.

During the 2017 Africa–France Summit, held in Bamako, Keita Aminata Maiga hosted an event for African first ladies to promote reproductive healthcare for young people across Africa.

Maiga is the president of the Agir Association, which was founded in 1994 and became a non-governmental organization in June 2005. She has also served on the National Olympic and Sports Committee of Mali since 2000.

In August 2020, her husband was overthrown in the 2020 Malian coup d'état.
