= Kassama =

- Commune and village
- Location in Mali
- Coordinates: 13°3′23″N 11°7′0″W
- Country: Mali
- Region: Kayes Region
- Cercle: Kéniéba Cercle

Population (2009 census)
  - Total: 19,230
- Time zone: UTC+0 (GMT)

Kassama is a village and commune in the Cercle of Kéniéba in the Kayes Region of south-western Mali. The commune includes 23 villages and in the 2009 census had a population of 19,230.
