= Sagalo =

- Commune and village
- Location in Mali
- Coordinates: 12°12′2″N 10°42′1″W
- Country: Mali
- Region: Kayes Région da
- Cercle: Kéniéba Cercle

Population (2009 census)
  - Total: 15,830
- Time zone: UTC+0 (GMT)

Sagalo is a remote village and rural commune in the Cercle of Kéniéba in the Kayes Region of south-western Mali. It lies near the border with Guinea. The commune includes 17 villages and at the time of the 2009 census had a population of 15,830.
