= Dialafara =

- Commune and village
- Location in Mali
- Coordinates: 13°27′38″N 11°22′43″W
- Country: Mali
- Region: Kayes Region
- Cercle: Kéniéba Cercle

Population (2009 census)
  - Total: 17,705
- Time zone: UTC+0 (GMT)

Dialafara is a village and rural commune in the Cercle of Kéniéba in the Kayes Region of south-western Mali. The commune includes 35 villages and in the 2009 census had a population of 17,705.
