= Bayé, Kayes =

Bayé
- Commune and village
- Location in Mali
- Coordinates: 12°49′38″N 11°1′2″W
- Country: Mali
- Region: Kayes Region
- Cercle: Kéniéba Cercle
- Elevation: 341 m (1,119 ft)

Population (2009 census)
  - Total: 16,093
- Time zone: UTC+0 (GMT)

Bayé is a village and rural commune in the Cercle of Kéniéba in the Kayes Region of south-western Mali. The commune contains 17 villages and in the 2009 census had a population of 16,093.
