= Douniah Airlines =

West-African airline

IATA	ICAO	Call sign
DH	—	—
- Ceased operations: Not launched Eldridge
- Hubs: Bamako–Sénou International Airport
- Fleet size: 1
- Destinations: 7
- Headquarters: Bamako, Mali
- Website: none

Douniah Airlines is an airline based at Bamako–Sénou International Airport in Mali. As of April 28, 2014, the airline served seven airports in seven West-African countries. The airline's fleet included an ATR 72.

== Destinations ==
As of May 2014 the airline had seven destinations:

Hub
Future
Terminated destination

City	Country	Airport	Refs
Bamako	Mali	Bamako–Sénou International Airport	
Cotonou	Benin	Cadjehoun Airport	
Conakry	Republic of Guinea	Conakry International Airport	
Freetown	Sierra Leone	Lungi International Airport	
Malabo	Equatorial Guinea	Malabo International Airport	
Lagos	Nigeria	Murtala Muhammed International Airport	
Libreville	Gabon	Libreville International Airport	

== Fleet ==
As of May 2014 the Douniah Airlines fleet consists of the following aircraft:

Eagle Atlantic Airlines fleet
Aircraft	In Service	Passengers		
Aircraft	In Service	C	Y	Total
ATR 72	1			
Total	1			
