= Camp Castor =

Military base in Mali

- Kamp Castor
- Gao International Airport; Near Gao in Mali
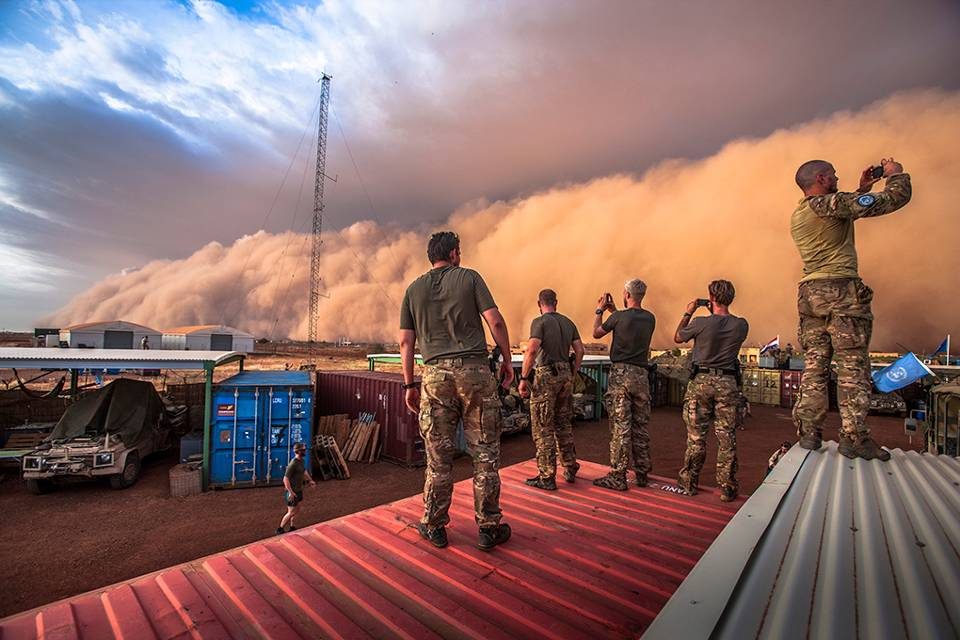
- Dutch troops at Camp Caster in 2014 watching an approaching sandstorm

Site information
- Type: forward operating base
- Operator: Bundeswehr
- Condition: abandoned

Location
- Location within Mali
- Coordinates: 16.247222°N 0.019444°W

Site history
- Built: 2014
- In use: 2014 - 2023

Camp Castor was an international peacekeeping forward operating base in the town of Gao, Mali, supporting activities of the United Nations Multidimensional Integrated Stabilization Mission in Mali (MINUSMA) from 2014 until 2023.

== History ==
After the Netherlands contributed 380 troops to MINUSMA in April 2014, these forces began building Camp Castor to accommodate special forces and helicopters among other assets. German aircraft replaced the seven departing Dutch helicopters in early 2017, as overall command of the base also transitioned to the Bundeswehr. Special forces from Denmark and the Czech Republic were also stationed at Castor.

== Location ==
Camp Castor was in between the joint civilian-military MINUSMA camp Supercamp and the southeastern edge of the Gao International Airport. The French army operates a nearby base serving Operation Barkhane. At the northeast end of the airfield is Camp Firhoun Ag Alinsar, a Malian army base. Adjoined to Castor is the UK element of MINUSMA; Camp Bagnold, housing LRRG(M) with supporting elements from the Army and RAF.

== Incidents ==
An Apache helicopter of the Dutch Army crashed in March 2015 after an attempted emergency landing near Gao.

In July 2017 a Camp Castor-based, German Eurocopter Tiger crashed at Tabankort in Bourem Cercle, killing both crewmembers.

== Media Coverage ==
The German Ministry of Defence published a 40-episode video series documenting the everyday lives of peacekeeping troops in Camp Castor.
