= Faraba, Kayes =

Faraba
- Commune and village
- Location in Mali
- Coordinates: 12°26′4″N 10°53′54″W
- Country: Mali
- Region: Kayes Region
- Cercle: Kéniéba Cercle

Area
  - Total: 1,167 km^{2} (451 sq mi)

Population (2009 census)
  - Total: 8,563
  - Density: 7.338/km^{2} (19.00/sq mi)
- Time zone: UTC+0 (GMT)

Faraba is a village and rural commune in the Cercle of Kéniéba in the Kayes Region of south-western Mali. The commune includes 12 villages and in the 2009 census had a population of 8,563.
