= Sitakilly =

- Commune and town
- Location in Mali
- Coordinates: 13°6′27″N 11°13′43″W
- Country: Mali
- Region: Kayes Region
- Cercle: Kéniéba Cercle

Population (2009 census)
  - Total: 27,501
- Time zone: UTC+0 (GMT)

Sitakilly (also Sitakily and Sitakili) is a small town and commune in the Cercle of Kéniéba in the Kayes Region of south-western Mali. The commune includes the town and 13 villages. At the time of the 2009 census the commune had a population of 27,501.
