= Faléa =

- Commune and village
- Location in Mali
- Coordinates: 12°15′53″N 11°16′30″W
- Country: Mali
- Region: Kayes Region
- Cercle: Kéniéba Cercle

Population (2009 census)
  - Total: 17,455
- Time zone: UTC+0 (GMT)

Faléa is a village and rural commune in the Cercle of Kéniéba in the Kayes Region of south-western Mali. The commune includes 20 villages and in the 2009 census had a population was 17,455.
