= Kownaty =

Kownaty may refer to the following places:

- Kownaty, Łosice County in Masovian Voivodeship (east-central Poland)
- Kownaty, Płońsk County in Masovian Voivodeship (east-central Poland)
- Kownaty, Podlaskie Voivodeship (north-east Poland)
- Kownaty, Greater Poland Voivodeship (west-central Poland)
- Kownaty, Lubusz Voivodeship (west Poland)
