= Armand Béouindé =

Burkinabé politician (born 1962)

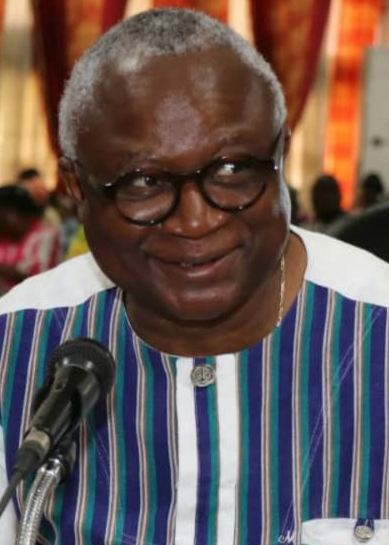
- Béouindé in 2019

Mayor of Ouagadougou
- In office June 18, 2016 – 2022

Personal details
- Born: Armand Roland Pierre Béouindé; November 11, 1962 (age 63) Kaya, Upper Volta (now Burkina Faso)
- Party: CDP (1990–2014); MPP (2014-present)

Armand Roland Pierre Béouindé is a Burkinabe politician who served as the mayor of Ouagadougou between 2016 and 2022.

== Biography ==
Béouindé was born on November 11, 1962, in Kaya, then Upper Volta. Before becoming mayor, he served as a training manager and is the director of several companies; he's the commercial director of Alpha-Press, commercial director of Graphi Service, and general director of Graphi Imprim. Béouindé also served as the vice-president for the Association for Integrity and Stable Development of Burkina Faso (A2DI), a coordinator at a managerial training group, and as the former president of ASFA Yennenga.

Politically, Béouindé was originally a part of Blaise Compaoré's political party Congress for Democracy and Progress (CDP), but left with Roch Marc Christian Kaboré and other friends of his after the 2014 Burkina Faso uprising. He co-founded the People's Movement for Progress (MPP) with Kabore later that year, and served as a campaign manager for Kabore's election campaign in 2015.

Béouindé was elected as the mayor of Ouagadougou on June 18, 2016. As mayor, his development plan for the city was dubbed Ouaga21, named for his deadline and final year in power in 2021. Ouaga21 focused mainly on security in the city, environmental issues, and mobility. He also made plans to increase water availability and other key resources to the city, earning the money by increasing tax availability and transparency. A key tenet of Béouindé's policies in the city were expanding social welfare programs and promoting diversity, although this sometimes caused financial issues.
