= Hamadou Konaté =

Malian politician

Hamadou Konaté is a Malian politician. He served as the Malian Minister of National Unity and Humanitarian Action. He is married to Suzanne Konaté Maïga, a public health administrator who served as secretary of state for social action and the promotion of women.
