= Dabia =

- Commune and village
- Location in Mali
- Coordinates: 12°40′17″N 11°8′15″W
- Country: Mali
- Region: Kayes Region
- Cercle: Kéniéba Cercle

Population (2009 census)
  - Total: 10,832
- Time zone: UTC+0 (GMT)

Dabia is a village and rural commune in the Cercle of Kéniéba in the Kayes Region of south-western Mali. It is located near the border with Guinea. The commune includes 13 villages and in the 2009 census had a population of 10,832.
