= Moussa Konaté =

Moussa Konaté may refer to:

- Moussa Konaté (writer), a Malian writer
- Moussa Konaté (kickboxer), a French Muay Thai kickboxer
- Moussa Konaté (footballer), a Senegalese footballer
