= Kéniéba Cercle =

Coordinates: 12°40′N 11°00′W

Kéniéba
- Cercle
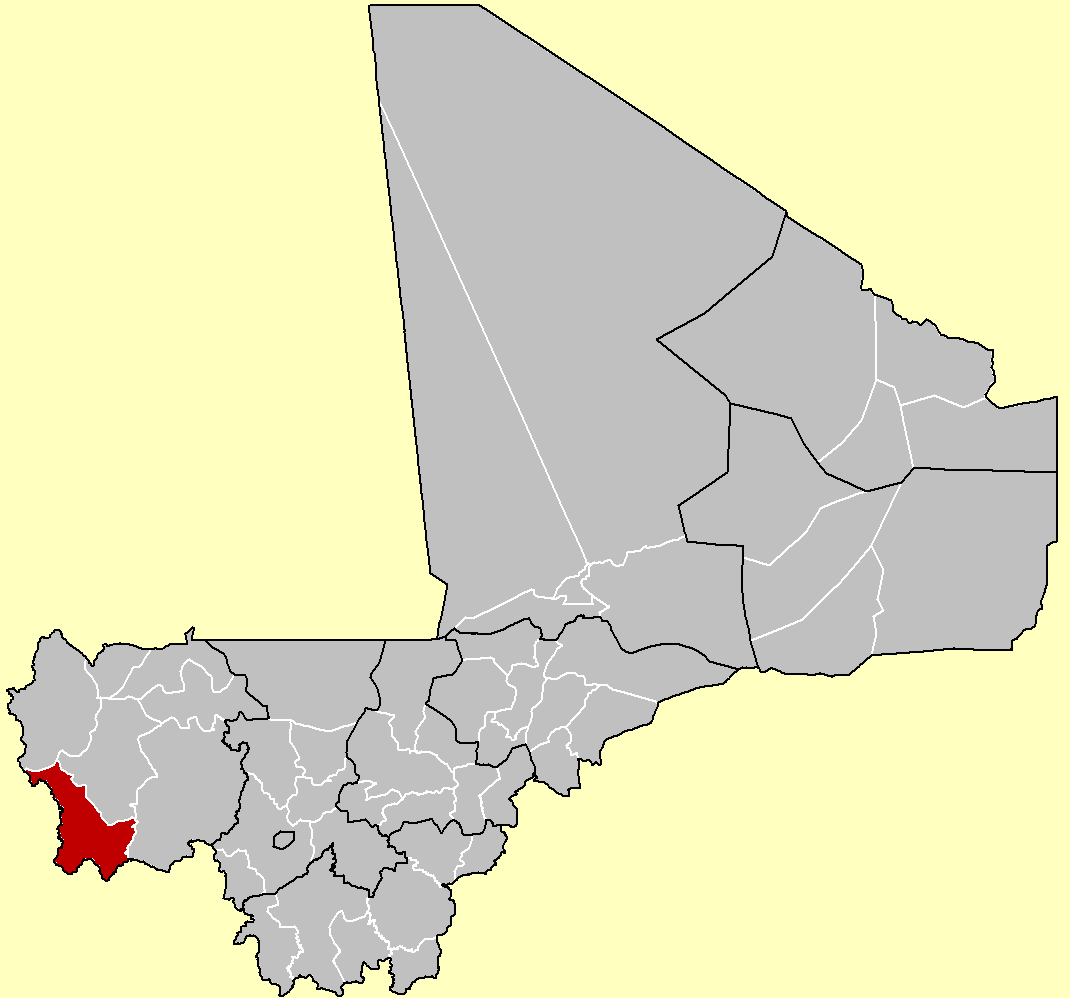
- Location of Kéniéba Cercle in the Kayes Region of Mali
- Country: Mali
- Region: Kayes Region
- Admin HQ (Chef-lieu): Kéniéba

Area
  - Total: 35,250 km^{2} (13,610 sq mi)

Population (2009)
  - Total: 194,153
  - Density: 5.508/km^{2} (14.27/sq mi)
- Time zone: UTC+0 (GMT)

Kéniéba Cercle is a subdivision of the Kayes Region of Mali. The administrative center (chef-lieu) is the town of Kéniéba.

Kéniéba Cercle contains the Malian section of the hilly Bambouk region, the historic gold mining region of the Ghana Empire and the Mali Empire. Kéniéba Cercle is divided from the Senegalese Bambouk by the valley of the Falémé River.

The cercle is subdivided into twelve communes:

- Bayé
- Dabia
- Dialafara
- Dombia
- Faléa
- Faraba
- Guénégoré
- Kassama
- Kéniéba
- Kroukoto
- Sagalo
- Sitakilly
