= Mopti Airport =

Airport in Sévaré, Mali

Mopti Airport Ambodedjo Airport Aéroport de Mopti
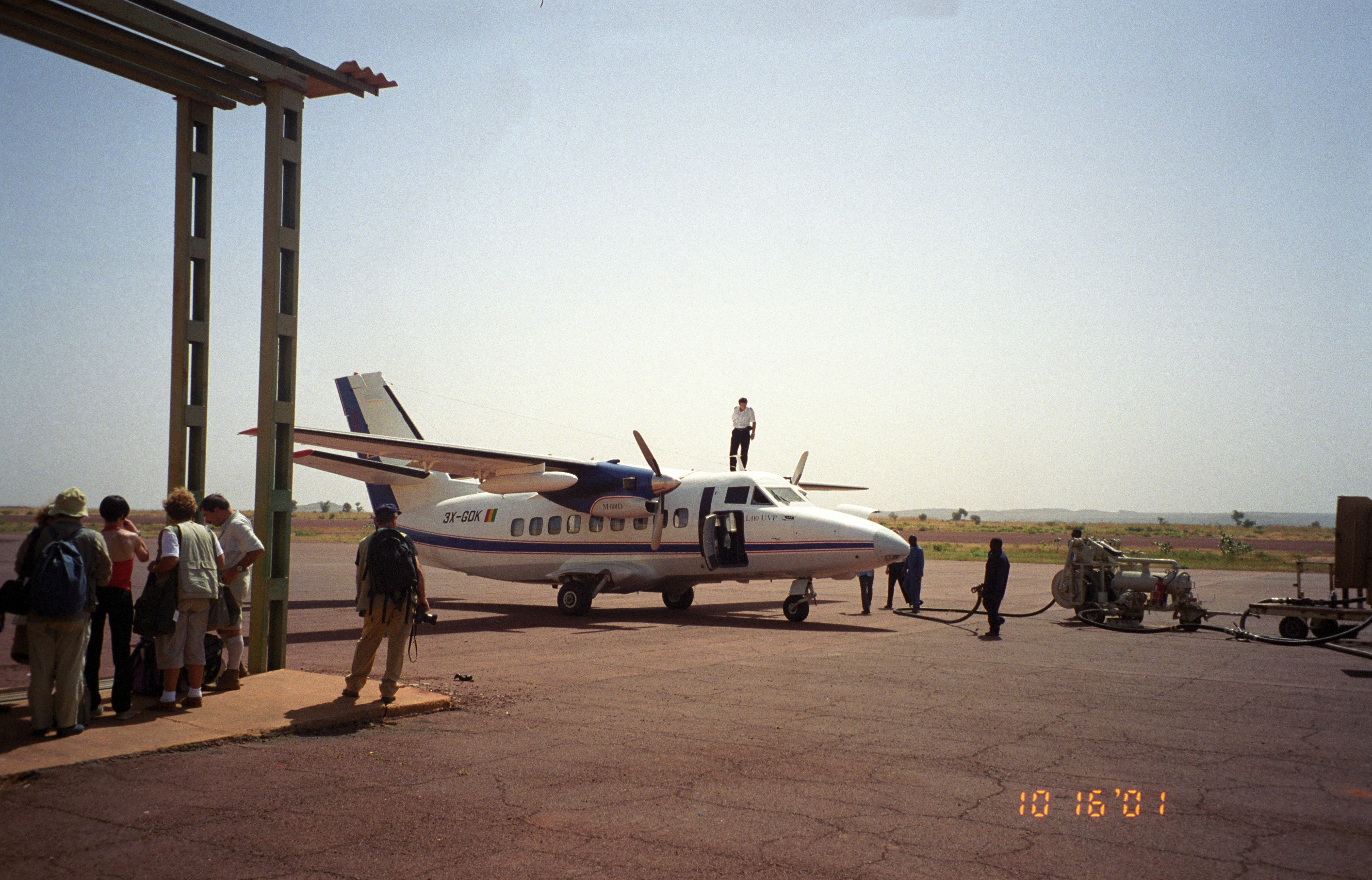
- IATA: MZI; ICAO: GAMB

Summary
- Airport type: Public / Military
- Serves: Mopti, Mali
- Location: Sévaré
- Elevation AMSL: 909 ft (277 m)
- Coordinates: 14°30′46″N 004°04′46″W

Map
- Location of airport in Mali

Runways
Direction	Length		Surface
Direction	m	ft	Surface
05/23	2,542	8,340	Asphalt
- Source: DAFIF

Mopti Airport (IATA: MZI, ICAO: GAMB), also known as Ambodedjo Airport (French: Aéroport Ambodedjo), serves the city of Mopti, in the Mopti Region in Mali. It is located near the town of Sévaré.

== Facilities ==
The airport is at an elevation of 906 feet (276 m) above mean sea level. It has one runway designated 05/23 with an asphalt surface measuring 2,542 by 29 metres (8,340 ft × 95 ft).

== Airlines and destinations ==
Airlines	Destinations
Sky Mali	Bamako, Timbuktu
