= Engine pressure ratio =

Total pressure ratio across a jet engine

The engine pressure ratio (EPR) is the total pressure ratio across a jet engine, measured as the ratio of the total pressure at the exit of the propelling nozzle divided by the total pressure at the entry to the compressor.

Jet engines use either EPR or compressor/fan RPM as an indicator of thrust. When EPR is used, the pressures are measured in front of the compressor and behind the turbine.

== Integrated engine pressure ratio ==
The integrated engine pressure ratio (IEPR) is a ratio used on some turbofans to include fan discharge total pressure and compressor inlet total pressure. If compressor inlet pressure is P0 and fan discharge total pressure is P1, then the integrated engine pressure ratio will be P1 /P0.

The IEPR is an engine indicator system unique to the Rolls-Royce RB211.

== See also ==
- Jet engine performance
- Turbofan
