= Kéniéba =

- Commune and town
- Location in Mali
- Coordinates: 13°6′N 11°24′W
- Country: Mali
- Region: Kayes Region
- Cercle: Kéniéba Cercle

Population (2009 census)
  - Total: 39,557
- Time zone: UTC+0 (GMT)

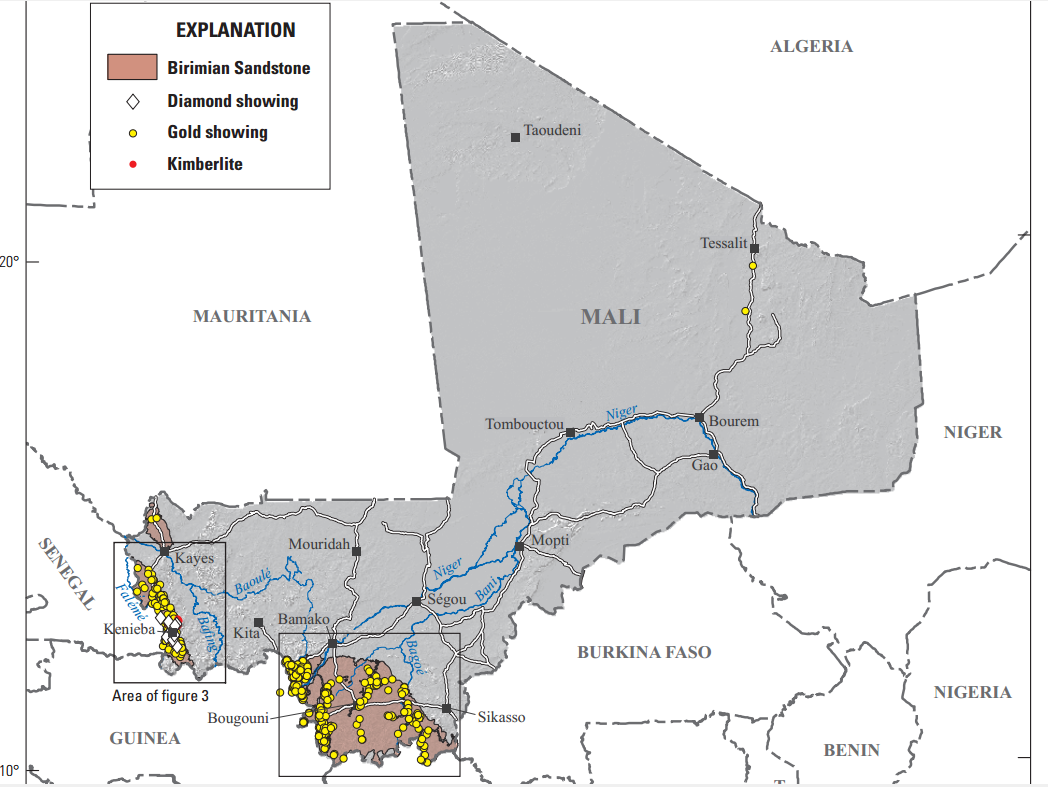
Geological map of Birimian outcrops in Mali, at Bougouni and Kenieba

Kéniéba is a rural commune, small town and seat of Kéniéba Cercle in Mali's Kayes Region, near the Mali–Senegal border. As well as the main town, the commune includes 26 other villages. In the 2009 census the commune had a population of 39,557.

Kéniéba is located in the gold-rich region of Bambouk.

== Climate ==
Climate data for Kéniéba (1961–1990)
Month	Jan	Feb	Mar	Apr	May	Jun	Jul	Aug	Sep	Oct	Nov	Dec	Year
Mean daily maximum °C (°F)	34.6 (94.3)	37.3 (99.1)	39.2 (102.6)	40.2 (104.4)	38.9 (102.0)	34.5 (94.1)	31.3 (88.3)	30.5 (86.9)	31.3 (88.3)	33.1 (91.6)	35.1 (95.2)	34.2 (93.6)	35.0 (95.0)
Daily mean °C (°F)	26.9 (80.4)	29.1 (84.4)	31.2 (88.2)	32.8 (91.0)	32.7 (90.9)	29.5 (85.1)	27.4 (81.3)	26.7 (80.1)	27.0 (80.6)	27.7 (81.9)	26.7 (80.1)	25.4 (77.7)	28.6 (83.5)
Mean daily minimum °C (°F)	18.5 (65.3)	20.8 (69.4)	23.1 (73.6)	25.5 (77.9)	26.6 (79.9)	24.5 (76.1)	23.1 (73.6)	22.7 (72.9)	22.5 (72.5)	22.1 (71.8)	18.1 (64.6)	16.2 (61.2)	22.0 (71.6)
Average precipitation mm (inches)	0.0 (0.0)	0.1 (0.00)	0.2 (0.01)	5.2 (0.20)	49.6 (1.95)	160.1 (6.30)	252.0 (9.92)	352.8 (13.89)	245.1 (9.65)	83.6 (3.29)	3.6 (0.14)	0.2 (0.01)	1,152.5 (45.37)
Average precipitation days	0.0	0.1	0.1	1.1	4.5	12.0	17.6	20.1	17.1	8.1	0.4	0.1	81.2
Mean monthly sunshine hours	261.1	256.1	278.0	262.4	267.3	230.5	189.1	170.6	197.1	222.5	253.4	255.4	2,843.5
Source: NOAA

== Twin towns ==
Kéniéba is twinned with the following towns:

- Tonopah, Nevada, United States
