= Agence Nationale de l'Aviation Civile du Mali =

Civil aviation authority of Mali

Agence Nationale de l'Aviation Civil (ANAC MALI, "National Civil Aviation Agency") is the civil aviation authority of Mali. Its head office is in Bamako. As of 2014 Issa Saley Maiga is the director general.
