= Sky Mali =

Private airline in Mali

IATA	ICAO	Call sign
ML	FML	—
- Founded: 22 July 2020; 6 years ago
- Operating bases: Bamako International Airport
- Focus cities: Bamako; Timbuktu
- Fleet size: 1
- Destinations: 5
- Parent company: Al Sayegh Group of Abu Dhabi
- Headquarters: Modibo Keita International Airport
- Key people: Lucien d’Almeida; Chairman; Baba Haïdara; General Manager and CEO
- Website: Homepage

Sky Mali, (IATA: ML, ICAO: FML), is a private airline operating in Mali. It serves local destinations, from its operations base at Modibo Keita International Airport, near Bamako, the Malian capital city.

== Location ==
The airline maintains its headquarters at Bamako International Airport, approximately 15.5 kilometres (10 mi), by road, southeast of the city of Bamako, the capital of Mali.

== History ==
Sky Mali was established in 2020. It received an Air Operator Certificate, from the National Aviation Agency of Mali, on 22 July 2020. The airline began commercial operations during the third quarter of calendar year 2020. Its inaugural flight was on 29 September 2020, from Bamako to Kayes. As of February 2021, the load factors on the Bamako–Gao and Bamako–Kayes routes were in excess of 80 percent.

In June 2021, Sky Mali announced the addition of their first international routes: Bamako-Cotonou-Libreville (launched 9 August), and Bamako-Kayes-Dakar (launched 28 July).

== Overview ==
With the cessation of service by Air Mali (2005), there had been no scheduled domestic air service inside Mali, since 2012. With backing of the Al Sayegh Group of Abu Dhabi, Sky Mali was established and began commercial operations during the second half of 2020. As of February 2021, five Malian destinations are served, including the airline's hub at Bamako International Airport.

== Ownership and associated companies ==
At its inception, Sky Mali SA, "a public limited company incorporated under Malian law", was a 100 percent subsidiary of Al Sayegh Group, a Emirati investment holding company, based in Abu Dhabi. At that time, it was expected that other private investors and possibly the Government of Mali would become investors in the business.

== Destinations ==
As of September 2025, Sky Mali serves four domestic and two international routes to Niger and Ivory Coast

- Mali
  - Bamako – Bamako International Airport (Hub)
  - Gao – Gao International Airport
  - Kayes – Kayes Airport
  - Timbuktu – Timbuktu Airport
- Niger
  - Niamey – Diori Hamani International Airport
- Ivory Coast
  - Abidjan – Félix-Houphouët-Boigny International Airport

== Fleet ==
=== Current fleet ===
As of July 2026, Sky Mali operates the following aircraft:

Sky Mali
Aircraft	In fleet	Order	Passengers	Notes
Boeing 737-500	1		114	
Total	1	0		

=== Former fleet ===
As of August 2025, Sky Mali operated 1 Boeing 737-500.

The airline also previously operated the following aircraft:

- 1 Boeing 737-400

== See also ==
- Airlines of Africa
- List of airlines of Mali
