= Gao International Airport =

Gao International Airport Aéroport international de Gao
- An Antonov An-22 lands at Gao Airport in December 2016, before the runway's paving.
- IATA: GAQ; ICAO: GAGO

Summary
- Airport type: Joint Public/Military
- Location: Gao, Mali
- Elevation AMSL: 869 ft / 265 m
- Coordinates: 16°14′54″N 000°00′20″E

Map
- Location within Mali

Runways
Direction	Length		Surface
Direction	ft	m	Surface
07/25	8,202	2,500	Asphalt [since 2018]

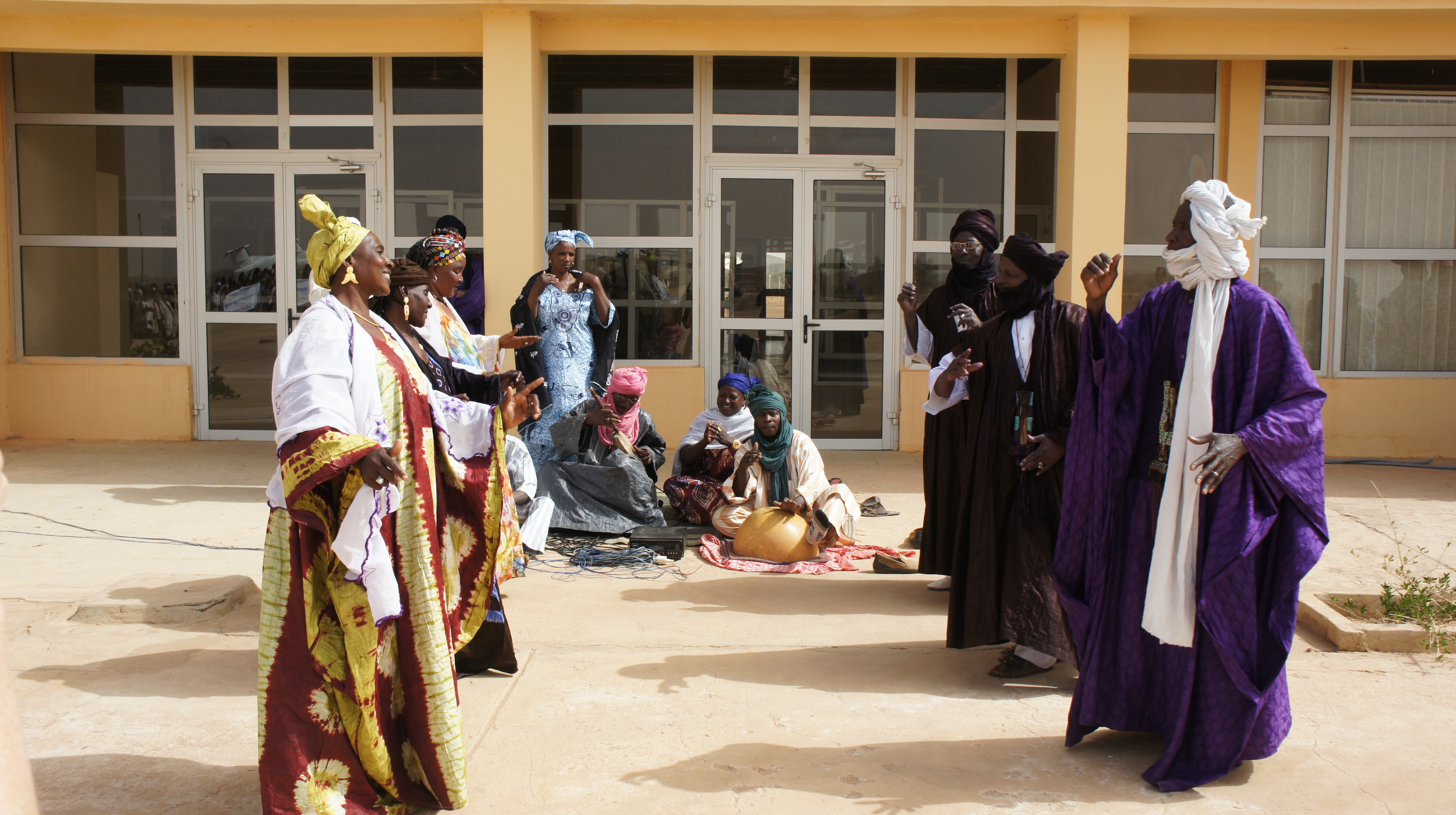
Gao Airport (2012)

Gao International Airport (IATA: GAQ, ICAO: GAGO), also known as Korogoussou Airport (French: Aéroport de Korogoussou), is an airport in Gao, Mali. The airport's runway, which was paved in asphalt in 2018, crosses through the prime meridian.

== Airlines and destinations ==
Airlines	Destinations
Sky Mali	Bamako, Niamey

In addition to civilian travel, Gao serves the adjacent Malian military base Camp Firhoun Ag Alinsar as well as the German military Camp Castor, United Nations civil-military peacekeeping Supercamp (both supporting the United Nations Multidimensional Integrated Stabilization Mission in Mali), and a French military base supporting Operation Barkhane. The Royal Air Force has also deployed Chinook helicopters to Gao.

== Accidents and incidents ==
- On July 12, 1951, a French Air Force Douglas C-47, F-RAMM, crashed and burst into flames after takeoff. Eight out of the 17 on board were killed.
- On July 24, 1951, a Sabena Douglas DC-3 registered as OO-CBA crashed shortly after departure, killing all three occupants. The probable cause was a failure of the right engine and subsequent control difficulties.
- On March 24, 1952, a Lockheed Lodestar of Société Africaine des Transports Tropicaux (SATT), F-ARTE, crashed 1.6 miles (2.5 kilometers) NE of the airport on initial climb, killing 17 of the 21 onboard. The plane was headed to Tamanrasset on the return leg of a round trip from Nice. The crash, the first fatal airliner accident in present-day Mali, was found to be caused by pilot fatigue.
- On March 17, 1956, a French Air Force Douglas C-47 was damaged beyond repair on takeoff. All 8 people on board perished.
- On March 30, 2018, UR-KDM, an Antonov An-12 of Cavok Air, was substantially damaged on landing. The flight originated at Châlons Vatry Airport and was carrying food for French troops stationed in Gao. The plane's first approach ended in a diversion to Bamako due to poor visibility. In the afternoon, the crew decided to make a second attempt at landing in Gao. With the visibility still low, the pilots requested that lights were illuminated at the runway threshold to make it easier to locate. Nonetheless, the runway was observed only on short final, leading to an unstablised approach, late flare and subsequent bounces, which collapsed the front landing gear. No one was injured. BEA, the French investigating agency, concluded that several factors contributed to the accident, including: pilot fatigue, the time sensitivity of the cargo, the limited effectiveness of the lighting put out at the runway threshold and the lack of contrast between the surroundings and dirt runway.
- On August 3, 2020, RA-74044, a UTAir Cargo Antonov An-74 operating for the United Nations as UNO052P, lost all electrical power about an hour after departure from Bamako due to the failure of both engine generators. Attempts to start the APU were unsuccessful. The crew continued the flight to Gao under VFR and put the plane down successfully without functioning flaps or thrust reverses. The aircraft came to rest nearly 400m past the runway threshold. No one was seriously injured but the aircraft was written off. An investigation by the Interstate Aviation Committee concluded that the crew had made several pre-flight shortcomings which led to the overheating of the generator oil systems and failed to adhere to standard operational procedures whilst attempting to start up the aircraft's APU.
- On September 23, 2023, a Malian Air Force Ilyushin Il-76 crashed whilst attempting to land at the airfield. Initial reports suggest the plane may have been linked to the Russian paramilitary organisation PMC Wagner. Early information suggested that between 7-149 people on board were killed, but this was never confirmed due to many reports contradicting each other and the fact that no passenger manifest was issued for the flight.
- On March 11, 2026, the Azawad Liberation Front attacked the military portion of the base with kamikaze drones and mortar fire. The Malian Army reported the next day that the attack caused minimal damage and no casualities.
