= Modibo Keita International Airport =

International Airport serving Bamako, Mali

Modibo Keita International Airport Aéroport international Modibo Keita
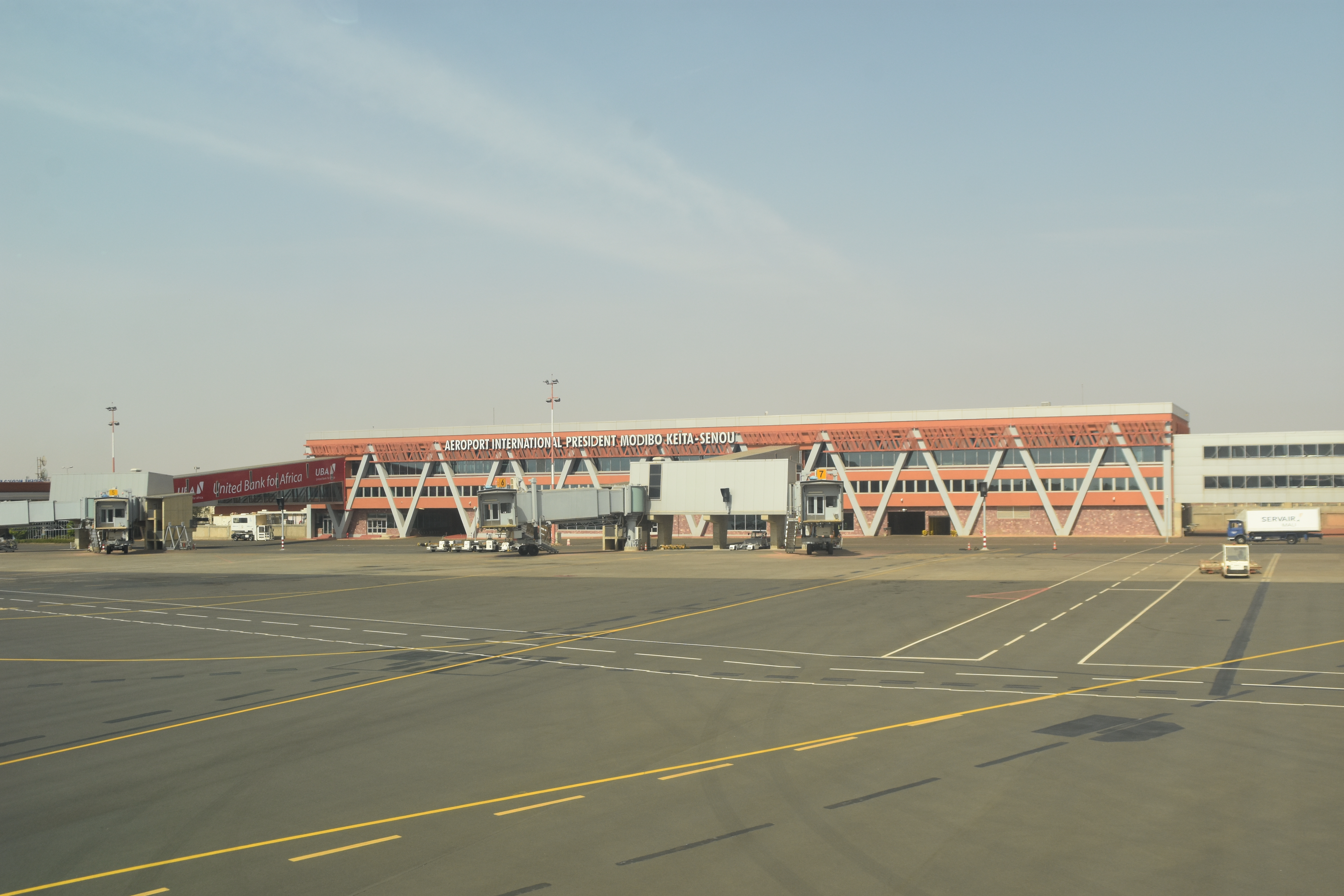
- IATA: BKO; ICAO: GABS

Summary
- Airport type: Joint (Public/Military)
- Operator: Aéroports du Mali (ADM)
- Location: Bamako, Mali
- Opened: 1974
- Elevation AMSL: 1,247 ft (380 m)
- Coordinates: 12°32′16″N 07°56′35″W
- Website: www.aeroport-bamako.com

Map
- Location of airport in Mali

Runways
Direction	Length		Surface
Direction	ft	m	Surface
06/24	8,879*	2,706*	Asphalt
- planned runway length extension to 10,444 ft. / 3,180 m complete by 9 Mar 2010 as part of Mali MCC.

Modibo Keita International Airport (IATA: BKO, ICAO: GABS) (formerly the Bamako–Sénou International Airport) is an international airport serving Bamako, the capital of Mali. It is located approximately 15 kilometres (9.3 mi) south of Bamako city centre. It is managed by Aéroports du Mali (ADM). Its operations are overseen by the Malian Ministry of Equipment and Transport.

== History ==
Bamako–Sénou Airport was opened to traffic in 1974. The airport was upgraded between 2007 and 2012 in a US$181 million project funded by the Millennium Challenge Corporation, a United States foreign aid agency.

On 17 September 2024, the airport was stormed by Jama'at Nusrat al-Islam wal Muslimin militants as part of a series of coordinated attacks across multiple locations in Bamako. The JNIM claimed to have destroyed aircraft and opened fire at the presidential hangar. An aircraft used for humanitarian work by the World Food Programme was also damaged. The airport was attacked by JNIM again on 25 April 2026 as part of a larger offensive.

== Military base ==
The airport is adjacent to Air Base 101, which is used by the Malian Air Force.

== Statistics ==
Passenger traffic steadily increased in the early 2000s. Government figures show 403,380 passengers in 1999, 423,506 in 2003, 486,526 in 2004, and 516,000 in 2005. In 2006 it was predicted to reach over 900,000 by 2015 under a low (4%) yearly growth rate scenario.

Total air traffic at BKO increased by 12.4% in 2007 and 14% in 2008. Most of this increase came in passenger transport, with the number of passengers served increasing by 20% in 2007 and 17% in 2008. Twenty-seven airline carriers operated weekly or better at BKO in the 2007–2008 period. This continued growth was offset by cargo flights' decline of 16.75% in 2007, and 3.93% in 2008.

== Airlines and destinations ==
=== Passenger ===
Airlines	Destinations
Air Algérie	Algiers
Air Burkina	Dakar–Diass, Ouagadougou
Air Côte d'Ivoire	Abidjan, Bouaké, Conakry, Dakar–Diass
Air Senegal	Dakar–Diass, Niamey
ASKY Airlines	Conakry, Dakar–Diass, Lomé, Niamey, Ouagadougou
Corsair International	Paris–Orly
Ethiopian Airlines	Addis Ababa, Dakar–Diass
Kenya Airways	Dakar–Diass, Nairobi–Jomo Kenyatta
Mauritania Airlines	Abidjan, Cotonou, Dakar–Diass, Nouakchott
Royal Air Maroc	Casablanca
Sky Mali	Abidjan, Gao, Kayes, Niamey, Timbuktu
Tunisair	Tunis
Turkish Airlines	Istanbul

=== Cargo ===
Airlines	Destinations
DHL Aviation	Lagos
Cargolux	Luxembourg

== Accidents and incidents ==
- On 24 July 1971, a Douglas C-47A (6V-AAP) of Air Ivoire crashed into a hill 67 seconds after take-off from runway 24 at night. The aircraft was operating a scheduled passenger flight. All six occupants were killed.
- On 31 May 1981, a Dassault Falcon 20C (7T-VRE) of the Algerian government crashed 8 km (5 miles) from here on approach, killing 3 of the 6 occupants. The plane was on an official state flight, carrying foreign minister Mohamed Seddick Benyahia. Benyahia survived, but was killed the following year in a shootdown.
- On 30 June 1996, a Boeing 707-369C (5X-JON) of Air Afrique leased from DAS Air Cargo became unstable shortly after landing due to a sudden burst of rain and veered off the runway, striking a bunker and detaching the right wing. All 4 occupants survived; the plane was written off.
- In October 2007 (day unknown), an Ilyushin Il-76TD (5A-DNQ) of Jamahiriya Air Transport sustained serious damage on landing when the nose gear collapsed. The plane was later repaired.
- On 14 June 2017, a Beechcraft 200 Super King Air (TZ-DDG) of Malian Aero Company suffered a landing accident after returning from a cloud-seeding operation over Mopti at 14:05. The plane came to rest on the right side of the runway with substantial propeller damage and was subsequently written off. The sole occupant survived.
