= List of unrecovered and unusable flight recorders =

This is a list of aircraft accidents and incidents for which flight data recorders (FDRs) and/or cockpit voice recorders (CVRs) were not recovered, were destroyed, or otherwise failed to provide complete and correct information.

FDRs and CVRs in commercial aircraft continuously record information and can provide key evidence in determining the causes of an aircraft loss. The greatest depth from which a flight recorder has been recovered is 16,000 feet (4,900 m), for the CVR of South African Airways Flight 295. Most flight recorders are equipped with underwater locator beacons to assist searchers in recovering them from offshore crash sites; however, these beacons run off a battery and eventually stop transmitting. A flight recorder cannot always be recovered, and some recorders that are recovered are too damaged to provide any data. Some recorders have also failed to provide adequate information for other reasons, such as poor maintenance, disconnection from power, or having relevant information recorded over by later events.

Date	Flight	Airline	Plane	Location	Type	Notes
1961-09-17	706	Northwest Airlines	Lockheed L-188 Electra	O'Hare International Airport, Illinois, United States	Accident	The FDR sustained high impact loads during crash. Parts of the FDR were found throughout the wreckage, foil containing data from the accident was fragmented and provided no useful information.
1965-08-16	389	United Airlines	Boeing 727-100	Lake Michigan, off Chicago, Illinois, United States	Accident	The FDR was fragmented by the impact; parts of the outer cover were found but the foil tape containing data was lost.
1966-03-05	911	British Overseas Airways Corporation	Boeing 707-400	Mount Fuji, Japan	Accident	The FDR was destroyed by post-crash fire; the airplane was not required to carry a CVR.
1966-04-22	280/D	American Flyers Airline	Lockheed L-188 Electra	Ardmore Municipal Airport, Oklahoma, United States	Accident	The FDR had suffered a mechanical failure unrelated to the accident and may not have been properly checked by the flight engineer before the flight; it had produced no recording for the flight. The airplane did not have a CVR and was not required to have one.
1966-08-06	250	Braniff International Airways	BAC 1-11-203AE	Richardson County, Nebraska, United States	Accident	The FDR was destroyed in the crash.
1966-10-01	956	West Coast Airlines	Douglas DC-9-14	Near Wemme, Oregon, United States	Accident	The CVR was destroyed by post-crash fire.
1966-11-15	708	Pan American World Airways	Boeing 727-100	Near Dallgow in former East Germany	Probable accident (disputed)	The plane crashed in East German territory during the Cold War; only half of the wreckage was relinquished by the Soviets. The fate of the CVR and FDR are unknown.
1969-09-21	801	Mexicana de Aviación	Boeing 727-100	Near Mexico City International Airport in Mexico City, Mexico	Accident	The plane crashed on the final approach; the FDR yielded no data as it was improperly installed two days prior. The CVR was removed by the same technicians two days prior to the crash and was not replaced.
1970-02-05	603	Dominicana de Aviación	Douglas DC-9-32	Caribbean Sea, near Santo Domingo, Dominican Republic	Accident	Neither flight recorder was ever found.
1970-05-02	980	ALM Antillean Airlines	Douglas DC-9-33CF	Caribbean Sea	Accident	Resting at a water depth of 5,000 ft (1,500 m); neither recorder was found.
1971-06-06	706	Hughes Airwest	Douglas DC-9-31	San Gabriel Mountains near Los Angeles, California, United States	Accident	The CVR was destroyed by post-crash fire.
1971-07-30	845	Pan American World Airways	Boeing 747-100	San Francisco International Airport, California, United States	Accident	The CVR recording was overwritten by other recordings.
1972-06-29	290	North Central Airlines	Convair CV-580	Lake Winnebago, near Appleton, Wisconsin, United States	Accident	One of two aircraft involved in the 1972 Lake Winnebago mid-air collision. An estimated 50% to 60% of the wreckage was recovered from the shallow, muddy water. The FDR was found in good condition, but no CVR was found.
1972-12-08	553	United Airlines	Boeing 737-200	Near Midway International Airport, Illinois, United States	Accident	The FDR was inoperative due to the mechanical malfunction of an internal gear wheel that occurred 14 minutes before the accident. The CVR recorded a cockpit discussion of the FDR fault, which may have been a distraction for the crew.
1973-01-02	3801	Pacific Western Airlines	Boeing 707-321C	Edmonton International Airport Alberta, Canada	Accident	CVR had been so severely burnt so that no information could be recovered and the FDR ceased recording 22 days before the accident due to the foil un-wounding from the supply spool.
1973-07-22	816	Pan American World Airways	Boeing 707-320B	Pacific Ocean, off Papeete, Tahiti	Accident	Resting at a water depth of 700 m (2,300 ft); neither recorder was found.
1973-08-28	742	Trans World Airlines	Boeing 707-320B	Pacific Ocean near Los Angeles, United States	Accident	CVR overwritten by other recordings.
1973-11-03	27	National Airlines	McDonnell Douglas DC-10-10	En route over New Mexico	Accident	The FDR was inoperative at the time of the accident.
1974-01-26	301	Turkish Airlines	Fokker F28-1000 Fellowship	Izmir Cumaovası Airport, Cumaovası, İzmir, Turkey	Accident	The CVR was defective and did not record any data from the accident flight.
1974-09-08	841	Trans World Airlines	Boeing 707-320B	Ionian Sea, near Greece	Bomb	Resting at a water depth of 3,164 m (10,381 ft). By the time the main wreckage was located, conclusive evidence of a bomb explosion had been found, and it was decided that whatever additional information the recorders held would not justify the cost and difficulty of recovering them. Neither of the recorders were ever found.
1974-12-04	138	Martinair	Douglas DC-8	Maskeliya, Sri Lanka	Accident	FDR completely disintegrated by impact. Small fragments of the foil tape from the unit were recovered from the crash site, but all of the fragments were from the supply spool of the recorder, and thus did not contain any flight data. The aircraft did not carry a CVR.
1975-09-30	240	Malév	Tupolev Tu-154	near the Lebanese shoreline	Unknown	Resting at a water depth between 600 and 1,000 m (2,000 and 3,300 ft); neither recorder was found.
1975-11-12	032	Overseas National Airways	McDonnell Douglas DC-10-30CF	John F. Kennedy International Airport, New York City, United States	Accident	The CVR was destroyed by post-crash fire.
1976-04-05	60	Alaska Airlines	Boeing 727-100	Ketchikan International Airport, Ketchikan, Alaska, United States	Accident	The CVR was destroyed by post-crash fire.
1976-08-15	011	SAETA	Vickers Viscount 785D	Chimborazo volcano, Ecuador	Accident	Speculation surrounding the existence of both the FDR and the CVR followed the discovery of the plane's remains in 2002, after being lost for 26 years. Civil aviation authorities claimed it didn't carry any device, but a former SAETA pilot claimed that the Viscount had carried at least an FDR. A former SAETA executive also claimed that the plane was acquired with both devices. In the end, due to the crash site's high altitude, harsh weather, and inaccessible and remote location, it was declared a holy field (de facto and de jure graveyard) and no investigation was made into the causes of the crash.
1976-10-13	N730JP	Lloyd Aéreo Boliviano	Boeing 707-130F	El Trompillo Airport, Santa Cruz de la Sierra, Bolivia	Accident	Both recorders were inoperative at the time of the accident; The tape medium in the FDR had run out and was found wrapped around the receiving reel, The CVR's cockpit area microphone was inoperative and did not record any useful information as a result.
1977-09-02	3751	Transmeridian Air Cargo	Canadair CL-44	2.5 Nautical Miles east of Waglan Island	Accident	Recovery was hampered by bad weather and poor visibility. Undersea cables in the area precluded the use of dredging equipment, making salvage operations very difficult. Only 25% of the wreckage was recovered after an extensive effort; the CVR and FDR were not found.
1977-12-18	730	SA de Transport Aérien	Sud Aviation Caravelle	4 kilometers southeast of Funchal Airport, Portugal	Accident	Aircraft was located but largely not recovered from the sea, it was not stated in the accident report which types of flight recorders were carried, only that none were recovered.
1977-12-18	2860	United Airlines	Douglas DC-8F-54	Near Kaysville, Utah, United States	Accident	The CVR had been inoperative for several days for reasons unrelated to the accident, and the preflight testing procedure failed to detect the malfunction.
1978-03-01	603	Continental Airlines	McDonnell Douglas DC-10	Los Angeles International Airport, California, United States	Accident	The CVR was inoperative due to having a broken tape. The flight captain discovered the malfunction during a preflight check and requested a repair, but no repair was performed and the captain did not recheck it. The problem was not recorded in the aircraft logbook.
1979-01-30	967	Varig	Boeing 707-323C	Pacific Ocean, around 200 kilometers East Northeast of Tokyo, Japan	Unknown	The aircraft debris was never located and thus, neither the CVR and FDR was found and the cause of the crash was never determined.
1979-05-25	191	American Airlines	McDonnell Douglas DC-10-10	Des Plaines, Illinois, United States	Accident	The separation of the left engine caused the cockpit voice recorder to cut off and lose power one second later, causing the last 31 seconds of the crash to not be recorded.
1980-03-14	007	LOT Polish Airlines	Ilyushin Il-62	Warsaw, Polish People's Republic	Accident	Both flight recorders were found, however, both devices stopped recording when their power connections were severed by flying debris or fire 26 seconds before the crash.
1980-08-19	163	Saudia	Lockheed L-1011 Tristar	Riyadh International Airport	Accident	The CVR stopped recording before the emergency landing due to fire damage.
1980-12-23	162	Saudia	Lockheed L-1011 Tristar	Over the Gulf of Bahrain	Accident	The CVR was overwritten and only contained conversations after the emergency landing. The FDR malfunctioned and recorded erroneous data.
1981-05-07	901	Austral Líneas Aéreas	BAC One-Eleven	Río de la Plata, near Buenos Aires, Argentina	Accident	Neither flight recorder was ever found.
1981-05-24	HC-BHG/FAE-723	Ecuadorian Air Force flight, on behalf of the Ecuadorian Government	Beechcraft Super King Air	Huairapungo Hill, Loja Province, Ecuador	Accident (disputed)	The existence and possible whereabouts of the CVR and/or FDR have been disputed. High-ranking Air Force officers stated to a 1992 inquiry by the Congress of Ecuador that the black box equipment wasn't acquired with the plane because it was considered optional. The acquisition records also did not show that either device was acquired, and Beechcraft said it had no record of selling or providing either device. The head of the 1992 parliamentary inquiry criticized the Ecuadorian armed forces for cordoning off the area and removing debris without any judicial process or security protocols, and no CVR or FDR were revealed to have been found.
1983-01-11	2885	United Airlines	Douglas DC-8F-54	Detroit Metropolitan Airport, Romulus, Michigan, United States	Accident	The FDR malfunctioned shortly after it was turned on, and resumed normal operation only about 15 seconds before the accident.
1982-09-13	995	Spantax	McDonnell Douglas DC-10-30CF	Málaga Airport, Málaga, Spain	Accident	The CVR was destroyed by post-crash fire.
1983-12-23	084	Korean Air	McDonnell Douglas DC-10-30CF	Anchorage International Airport, Anchorage, Alaska	Accident	The FDR was inoperative at the time of the accident, the CVR was not recovered.
1984-09-18	767-103	Aeroservicios Ecuatorianos	Douglas DC-8	Mariscal Sucre International Airport, Quito, Ecuador	Accident	The CVR tape's protective cover detached during the crash, exposing it to the post-crash fire and destroying it, even though investigators could not determine whether it was operational before the accident. The FDR was not operating at the time, and it was revealed that it was not properly maintained; the same side of its tape had been used three times, as it had not been reversed after 200 hours, according to the specifications of Sundstrand, its manufacturer. Moreover, because it had to be turned on and off manually, crews were apparently not used to turning it on.
1985-01-01	980	Eastern Air Lines	Boeing 727-225	25 nmi (46 km) from La Paz at the 19,600 ft (5,970 m) level of Andean peak Mt. Illimani.	Accident	Due to the extremely high altitude and inaccessibility of the accident location, the FDR and CVR could not be recovered. A team of three mountain climbers attempted to find the recorders in 2016, recovering part of the recorder mounting rack and a magnetic tape which they believed may have come from the CVR. The NTSB determined that the tape was not from a flight recorder.
1985-01-21	203	Galaxy Airlines	Lockheed L-188 Electra	Near Cannon International Airport, Reno, Nevada, United States	Accident	The recording tape of the FDR had run out and was found on the receiving spool sealed with a piece of transparent tape; the aircraft had been operated improperly for 117 hours after the tape had run out.
1985-02-19	006	China Airlines	Boeing 747SP-09	Pacific Ocean, near San Francisco, California, United States	Accident	The CVR was overwritten due to the aircraft being repaired and returned to service.
1985-07-10	5143	Aeroflot	Tupolev Tu-154B-2	Uchkuduk, Uzbekistan (formerly Uzbek SSR)	Accident	The CVR was completely destroyed by impact, explosion, and a post-crash fire.
1985-12-12	1285R	Arrow Air	Douglas DC-8-63CF	Gander International Airport, Gander, Newfoundland and Labrador, Canada	Accident	The CVR was unusable as its cockpit area microphone was inoperative at the time of the accident and did not record any information.
1987-05-09	5055	LOT Polish Airlines	Ilyushin Il-62	Warsaw, Polish People's Republic	Accident	Both flight recorders stopped recording, likely due to fire affecting their supply of electrical power, two minutes and 33 seconds before impact.
1987-11-28	295	South African Airways	Boeing 747-200M	Indian Ocean, near Mauritius	Accident	The CVR was located at a depth of 4,900 m (16,100 ft), but the quality of the audio was very poor and only the last 30 minutes were recorded. The tape stopped shortly after the emergency began due to the fire burning the wires to the CVR. FDR not found.
1987-11-29	858	Korean Air	Boeing 707-320C	Andaman Sea	Bomb	Neither flight recorder was ever found.
1988-07-03	655	Iran Air	Airbus A300	Persian Gulf	Shootdown	Neither flight recorder was ever found.
1989-03-10	1363	Air Ontario	Fokker F28-1000	Dryden Regional Airport, Dryden, Ontario, Canada	Accident	Both recorders were destroyed by post-crash fire.
1989-09-08	394	Partnair	Convair CV-580	Sea, near Copenhagen, Denmark	Accident	Both recorders were found but the CVR had stopped working just before takeoff due to a faulty modification of its power connection. The FDR was an antiquated model and had not been operating properly over a period of several years and especially in recent months, partly related to vibrations resulting from the use of counterfeit bolts, and it yielded distorted and incomplete data.
1990-01-25	052	Avianca	Boeing 707	Cove Neck, New York, United States	Accident	The FDR was inoperative at the time of the accident as the foil recording medium used had run out and been taped in place at some time before the flight. CVR usable
1990-09-11	OB-1303	Faucett Perú	Boeing 727-200	Atlantic Ocean, 350 miles southeast of Cape Race, Newfoundland, Canada	Accident	The plane and all sixteen aboard missing, along with the CVR and FDR. The aircraft was being returned to Peru after lease to Air Malta. The crew reported a low fuel notice and that they were preparing to ditch.
1991-05-26	004	Lauda Air	Boeing 767-300ER	Phu Toei National Park, Suphan Buri Province, Thailand	Accident	The FDR was destroyed by post-crash fire.
1991-07-11	2120	Nigeria Airways (operated by Nationair Canada)	Douglas DC-8-61	1.6 km (1 mi) from King Abdulaziz International Airport, Jeddah, Saudi Arabia	Accident	CVR ceased operating as part of the cascading failure caused by the extreme fire.
1992-01-03	4821	CommuteAir	Beechcraft 1900	Gabriels, New York, United States	Accident	The CVR was destroyed by post-crash fire; the aircraft did not carry an FDR.
1992-01-20	148	Air Inter	Airbus A320-100	Mont Sainte-Odile	Accident	The FDR was destroyed by post-crash fire.
1992-06-06	201	Copa Airlines	Boeing 737-200 Advanced	Darien Gap, near Tucuti, Panama	Accident	Both recorders were found, but the CVR tape was broken in several pieces, and the recording recovered from it was from a different flight.
1992-09-10	015	Expreso Aéreo	Fokker F27-500	Bellavista airstrip, San Martín Region, Peru	Accident	The CVR's magnetic tape was found to have been burned by the post-crash fire. The FDR was found not to be working properly at the time of the crash, as the tape was not connected.
1992-09-28	268	Pakistan International Airlines	Airbus A300B4-203	Kathmandu, Nepal	Accident	Both recorders were found, but no conversation could be heard on the CVR, rendering it unusable.
1992-10-04	1862	El Al	Boeing 747-200F	Groeneveen and Klein-Kruitberg flats in the Bijlmermeer, Amsterdam Zuidoost	Accident	The FDR was found but was severely damaged, with the tape broken in four pieces; the CVR was not found.
1992-11-24	3493	China Southern Airlines	Boeing 737-300	12.5 miles south of Guilin Airport, China	Accident	The FDR was found but was severely damaged, with the tape being exposed to the post-crash fire; the CVR was not found.
1992-12-07	012	China Airlines	McDonnell Douglas MD-11	20 miles east of Japan	Incident	The CVR was overwritten by other recordings.
1993-04-06	583	China Eastern Airlines	McDonnell Douglas MD-11	Near the Aleutian Islands, United States	Accident	The CVR, which used a continuous tape loop recording system, had a failure of its erasing function; it failed to erase previous recordings before recording new ones and instead superimposed new recordings along with the prior ones to produce a scrambled and degraded result, yielding no usable record. The nature of the failure was such that the maintenance personnel and flight crews could not detect that there was a problem by following ordinary procedures.
1994-04-06	9XR-NN	Rwanda Government	Dassault Falcon 50	1 Nautical Mile East of Kigali Airport, Kigali, Rwanda	Shootdown	The whereabouts and even the existence of the CVR and/or FDR have been disputed. Multiple independent investigations were unable to determine the location of any flight recorders the aircraft may have carried. A proper examination of the crash site was not conducted until 15 years after the shootdown, by which time a majority of the wreckage had been displaced or scavenged. The manufacturer performed maintenance on the airplane a year before the crash, during which they documented that no recorders were installed (though mounting racks were in place for the operator to install them if they later decided to). Rwandan aviation laws at the time required all airplanes used for transporting the head of state to carry both a CVR and an FDR. The possibility that recorders were installed at some point between the work performed by Dassault and the shootdown has not been ruled out.
1994-12-21	702P	Air Algérie, leased from Phoenix Aviation	Boeing 737-200	Willenhall, Coventry, United Kingdom	Accident	The FDR had been working only intermittently, and did not record any data from the accident flight. CVR usable.
1995-01-11	256	Intercontinental de Aviación	McDonnell Douglas DC-9-14	María La Baja, Colombia	Accident	The CVR was inoperative at the time of the accident and investigators could not determine how long it had been in that state.
1995-08-09	901	Aviateca	Boeing 737-200	San Vicente, El Salvador	Accident	The FDR was not found at the crash site, possibly scavenged from the site by locals.
1995-12-03	3701	Cameroon Airlines	Boeing 737-200	Near Douala International Airport, Douala, Cameroon	Accident	Both recorders were destroyed in the crash.
1995-12-20	41	Tower Air	Boeing 747-100	John F. Kennedy International Airport, New York City, United States	Accident	The FDR was inoperative during the accident due to a data acquisition unit problem.
1996-02-29	251	Faucett Perú	Boeing 737-200	Ciudad de Dios, Cerro Colorado District, near Arequipa, Peru	Accident	The FDR was usable, but the partly-burned and partly-damaged CVR had its magnetic tape broken at its beginning and only recorded isolated Spanish-language voices, possibly made during maintenance duties. Thus there was no recording of the flight crew's final moments before the crash. The airline claimed to have acquired the CVR in mid-1995, and to have done maintenance on it in two occasions immediately prior to the crash; however, the CVR's interior showed December 1989 as the date of its last opening.
1996-06-09	517	Eastwind Airlines	Boeing 737-200	Richmond International Airport, Richmond, Virginia, United States	Incident	CVR overwritten by other recordings.
1996-10-22	406	Millon Air	Boeing 707-320C	Manta, Ecuador	Accident	The FDR presented unspecified malfunctions that impeded "precise and full readouts of its data." The device was reportedly retrofitted into the aircraft and also lacked adequate documentation.
1996-11-23	961	Ethiopian Airlines	Boeing 767-200ER	Grande Comore, Comoros	Hijacking	Both recorders ceased recording before impact due to loss of electrical power.
1997-12-06	RA-82005	Ukrainian Cargo Airways	Antonov An-124-100	Mira Street, Irkutsk, Russia	Accident	The two flight recorders were in the center of the fire and were too badly damaged to provide meaningful data.
1997-12-19	185	SilkAir	Boeing 737-300	Musi River, Palembang, Indonesia	Accident	The CVR and FDR both ceased operating before the crash, possibly having been switched off by one of the pilots.
1997-12-28	826	United Airlines	Boeing 747-100	Pacific Ocean	Accident	CVR overwritten by other recordings.
1998-09-02	111	Swissair	McDonnell Douglas MD-11	Atlantic Ocean, southwest off Peggy's Cove, Nova Scotia, Canada	Accident	The CVR and FDR stopped functioning, likely due to fire affecting their supply of electrical power, 5 minutes and 37 seconds before impact.
1998-09-29	602	Lionair	Antonov An-24RV	Off the coast of Iranaitivu, Mannar District, Sri Lanka	Shootdown	No trace of either the FDR or the CVR was found among the 30% to 40% of the aircraft's wreckage that was salvaged in 2013. Only a highly corroded and damaged piece of debris was later identified as the auxiliary data recorder.
1999-04-15	6316	Korean Air Cargo	McDonnell Douglas MD-11	Xinzhuang, Shanghai	Accident	FDR completely destroyed by impact.
1999-08-07	5002	Cabo Verde Airlines	Dornier 228	Santo Antão, Cape Verde	Accident	The CVR was destroyed by post-crash fire; the airplane did not carry an FDR.
1999-10-31	990	EgyptAir	Boeing 767-300ER	Georges Bank, Atlantic Ocean	Disputed	Both recorders stopped functioning before the crash due to the engines being shut off.
1999-01-26	LZ-CAK	Hummingbird Helicopters	Mil Mi-8P	Rangali, Alif Dhaalu Atoll, Maldives	Accident	The CVR tape was contaminated by sea water and broke during the removal process. The film of the FDR was completely damaged. Neither recorder provided information.
1999-09-14	3838	Olympic Airways for the Hellenic Air Force	Dassault Falcon 900B	Over Călinești, Teleorman, Romania	Accident	No data was recorded on the CVR, which had been unserviceable and in poor technical condition long before the accident. The CVR tape was broken in two parts and showed strong abrasion, the magnetic recording heads were worn out, the maximum indication of the elapsed time (5,000 hours) was exceeded, and the cover seal was found broken. FDR data was partially available. Parameters for UTC, flight number and angle of attack were not properly recorded. The initial FDR readout had a 10–12% error rate and was refined to less than 2.5% in further analysis, but there remained several sub-frames of unreliable data in the relevant period, and at one point the data was briefly recorded as invalid shortly after upset recovery due to the reconnection of generator one and the battery, which were both accidentally disconnected during the accident. Required periodic FDR readout maintenance, which might have revealed the recording problems, was at least three years overdue.
2000-01-30	431	Kenya Airways	Airbus A310-300	Atlantic Ocean, East of Félix-Houphouët-Boigny International Airport, Abidjan, Ivory Coast	Accident	The FDR had not been operating for more than 25 flying hours due to a malfunction. The malfunction should have activated a warning light in the cockpit, and if the warning light had malfunctioned, this should have been detected by the crew during each routine pre-flight check. Operation of the plane with an FDR malfunction would not have been authorized on its previous flight, as that flight had been from an airport that had the ability to repair or replace the FDR. The technical log book was also not recovered, and copies of pages from the logbook which should have been left at the departing airport were not located.
2000-03-19	OB-1731	Aviandina	Boeing 727-100	Tacna Airport, Peru	Incident	The FDR did not record data from the flight as it was not properly connected. The CVR worked normally.
2000-05-21	N16EJ	East Coast Aviation Services d/b/a Executive Airlines	British Aerospace Jetstream	Bear Creek Township, Pennsylvania, United States	Accident	The CVR did not record data from the accident flight. Although it was concluded that the CVR was capable of recording information, it had apparently never functioned since its installation on the airplane. The investigators could not determine why it did not operate, but concluded that a cockpit functional check should have indicated to flight crews that it was not operating. The airplane did not carry an FDR (and was not required to have one).
2000-11-05	070	Cameroon Airlines	Boeing 747-200	Charles de Gaulle Airport, Paris, France	Accident	CVR overwritten by other recordings.
2001-03-03	114	Thai Airways International	Boeing 737-400	Don Mueang International Airport, Bangkok, Thailand	Accident	The FDR was not operating at the time of the explosion, which occurred on the ground before the engines were started.
2001-09-11	11	American Airlines	Boeing 767-200ER	North World Trade Center, New York City, United States	Hijack	Neither flight recorder was ever found.
2001-09-11	175	United Airlines	Boeing 767-200	South World Trade Center, New York City	Hijack	Neither flight recorder was ever found.
2001-09-11	77	American Airlines	Boeing 757-200	Pentagon, Washington D.C., United States	Hijack	The CVR was too badly damaged by fire to provide any information.
2001-10-04	1812	Siberia Airlines	Tupolev Tu-154	Black Sea	Shootdown	Resting at a water depth of 3,300 ft (1,000 m); neither recorder was found.
2002-05-04	4226	EAS Airlines	BAC One-Eleven 525FT	Mallam Aminu Kano International Airport, Kano, Nigeria	Accident	The FDR was recovered but inoperative; it had never been maintained by the airline and contained only recordings from flights carried out during its operation with previous airlines in Europe. The CVR was missing from the crash site.
2002-07-28	9560	Pulkovo Aviation Enterprise	Ilyushin Il-86	Near Sheremetyevo International Airport, Moscow, Russia	Accident	The FDR lacked information on the primary and backup stabilizer control systems, and there was a lack of crew comments on the CVR.
2002-08-30	4823	Rico Linhas Aéreas	Embraer EMB 120 Brasilia	Near Rio Branco International Airport, Rio Branco, Acre, Brazil	Accident	Both recorders were inoperative on the accident flight.
2003-05-25	N844AA	Aerospace Sales & Leasing	Boeing 727	Luanda, Angola	Unknown	Aircraft stolen, current whereabouts are unknown.
2003-05-26	4230	Ukrainian-Mediterranean Airlines	Yakovlev Yak-42	Trabzon, Turkey	Accident	The CVR was inoperative before the flight. The fuel indicator of the FDR was also not working.
2004-05-14	4815	Rico Linhas Aéreas	Embraer EMB 120 Brasilia	Eduardo Gomes International Airport	Accident	The FDR did not record any data.
2004-10-14	1602	MK Airlines	Boeing 747-200SF	Halifax Stanfield International Airport, Halifax, Nova Scotia, Canada	Accident	The CVR was exposed to extreme heat for an extended period which melted the recording tape.
2005-02-03	904	Kam Air	Boeing 737-200	Pamir Mountains, Afghanistan	Accident	The crash site was located at a near inaccessible area of the Pamir Mountains. Most of the wreckage was buried in deep snow, and specialists had to clear landmines from the area before it could be accessed. The FDR was eventually found with extreme difficulty, but it did not contain data due to a pre-existing fault in the data acquisition unit. The CVR was never found, and at least one investigator was killed during the search.
2005-09-05	091	Mandala Airlines	Boeing 737-200 Advanced	Polonia International Airport, Medan, Indonesia	Accident	Both recorders were found, and the captain and first officer's audio channels were recorded well, but the cockpit area microphone signal on the CVR was of poor quality, consistent with an intermittent electrical connection in the wiring circuit. The signal had an excessive amount of electrically induced noise or hum. Although some sounds were recorded on that channel, it was not possible to reach definitive conclusions about some important sounds that should have been recorded.
2005-10-22	210	Bellview Airlines	Boeing 737-200	Lisa Village, Ogun, Nigeria	Accident	Neither flight recorder was ever found.
2005-12-19	101	Chalk's Ocean Airways	Grumman G-73T Turbine Mallard	Miami Beach, Florida, United States	Accident	Not equipped with FDR; CVR recovered but recordings from both the accident flight and other flights were recorded and nothing audible could be recovered from it.
2006-03-31	6865	TEAM Linhas Aéreas	Let L-410 Turbolet	Pico da Pedra Bonita, Rio Bonito, Brazil	Accident	Both recorders were inoperative before the accident flight.
2006-08-13	2208	Air Algérie	Lockheed C-130 Hercules	Piacenza, Italy	Accident	The aircraft carried an older FDR which was inoperative at the time of the accident.
2007-11-30	4203	Atlasjet	McDonnell Douglas MD-83	Keçiborlu, Turkey	Accident	The CVR had been inoperative for 9 days before the crash. The FDR only recorded the first 14 minutes of the flight. No explanation was provided for why the FDR recording had stopped.
2008-08-24	6895	Iran Aseman Airlines	Boeing 737-200 Advanced	Manas International Airport, Bishkek, Kyrgyzstan	Accident	The FDR tape was damaged by fire, leading to a 13-second cut in data. The CVR was inoperative prior to the flight. It contained a recording of a previous flight on a different route with an unknown date. The CVR was also damaged by the fire.
2009-03-09	S9-SAB	Aerolift	Ilyushin Il-76T	Lake Victoria, near Entebbe International Airport, Uganda	Accident	Neither flight recorder was ever found.
2009-10-21	2241	Azza Transport	Boeing 707-330C	2 miles north of Sharjah International Airport	Accident	Both the FDR and the CVR had not been maintained in operating order and had no usable recording medium in them.
2009-10-21	188	Northwest Airlines	Airbus A320-200	Minnesota, United States	Incident	CVR overwritten by other recordings.
2010-11-11	ST-ARQ	Tarco Airlines	Antonov An-24	Zalingei Airport, Zalingei, Sudan	Accident	Both the CVR and FDR had not been maintained or checked. The FDR did not contain any data and the CVR only contained 4 minutes of a recording from a different flight.
2011-07-28	991	Asiana Airlines	Boeing 747-400F	Korea Strait	Accident	The FDR was recovered but the memory module was missing, apparently having been separated from its chassis and carried away in rough water, thus making the FDR useless. The CVR was not recovered.
2012-06-02	111	Allied Air	Boeing 727-221F Advanced	Accra International Airport, Accra, Ghana	Accident	Both recorders found but the quality of the CVR was poor, rendering it unusable.
2012-06-03	0992	Dana Air	McDonnell Douglas MD-83	Iju-Ishaga, Lagos, Nigeria	Accident	Both recorders were recovered, but the FDR was destroyed.
2012-12-09	N345MC	Private Aircraft	Learjet 25	Iturbide, Mexico	Accident	The FDR was recovered but with too much damage to yield any data. The CVR not found at crash site, and investigators could not determine whether the airplane was equipped with one at the time of the crash.
2013-01-23	C-GKBC	Kenn Borek Air	de Havilland Canada DHC-6 Twin Otter 300	Mount Elizabeth, Antarctica	Accident	The CVR was not serviceable during the flight and did not contain any information from the accident.
2013-01-29	102	National Airlines	Boeing 747-400BCF	Bagram Airfield, Parwan Province, Afghanistan	Accident	Both flight recorders were knocked off their racks by shifting cargo during takeoff, causing both of them to cease recording.
2014-03-08	370	Malaysia Airlines	Boeing 777-200ER	South Indian Ocean	Unknown	The plane and all 239 passengers and crew went missing, along with the CVR and FDR.
2014-07-24	5017	Air Algérie	McDonnell Douglas MD-83	Near Gossi, Mali	Accident	The CVR quality was poor, apparently due to a recorder malfunction prior to and unrelated to the crash, rendering it unusable.
2015-08-16	267	Trigana Air	ATR 42-300	Near Oksibil, West Papua, Indonesia	Accident	Both recorders were found, but the FDR, which had a history of maintenance problems, was inoperative at the time of accident.
2015-09-05	071	CEIBA Intercontinental	Boeing 737-800	Atlantic Ocean, east of Tambacounda, Senegal	Accident	CVR overwritten by other recordings.
2015-09-05	6V-AIM	Senegalair	Hawker-Beechcraft HS125-700A	Atlantic Ocean, west of Dakar, Senegal	Accident	Plane and all seven aboard crashed into the Atlantic Ocean after pilots fell victim to hypoxia. The CVR and the FDR were never recovered as the wreckage itself was not recovered.
2016-11-28	2933	LaMia	British Aerospace 146	Mt. Cerro Gordo, near La Unión, Antioquia, Colombia	Accident	For unknown reasons, the CVR stopped recording one hour and forty minutes before the FDR stopped recording. The FDR stopped recording before impact due to a loss of engine power.
2018-09-09	UR-TWO	South West Aviation	Let L-410UVP	Lake Yirol, near Yirol Airport, South Sudan	Accident	Both recorders were recovered but neither had their tape replaced and no data from the accident flight was recorded.
2020-01-23	N134CG	Coulson Aviation	Lockheed EC-130Q Hercules	Peak View, New South Wales, Australia	Accident	The CVR did not record any data from accident flight. Inertia switches—which were designed to cut power to the CVR when a large deceleration force is detected—activated during landing on a training flight in May 2019 and cut power to the CVR. Aircraft did not carry an FDR.
2020-05-22	8303	Pakistan International Airlines	Airbus A320-214	Model Colony, Karachi, Pakistan	Accident	The FDR stopped recording four minutes before crash due to loss of electrical power following dual engine and generator failure after belly landing and go-around. The CVR temporally stopped recording for eight seconds due to electrical failure, but started recording again after ram air turbine deployed.
2021-07-06	251	Petropavlovsk-Kamchatsky Air	Antonov An-26B-100	Palana, Russia	Accident	Both recorders were recovered, but the CVR was too badly damaged to retrieve data from it.
2023-06-04	N611VG	Private aircraft	Cessna Citation V	Mine Bank Mountain, Virginia, United States	Accident	The CVR was not recovered. The airplane was not equipped with an FDR.
2024-01-05	1282	Alaska Airlines	Boeing 737 MAX 9	Over Portland, Oregon, United States	Accident	The CVR, which had only a two-hour loop period, was not stopped after the plane landed, so the incident record was overwritten by other recordings.
2024-12-29	2216	Jeju Air	Boeing 737-800	Muan International Airport, Muan County, South Jeolla Province, South Korea	Accident	Both recorders stopped recording four minutes before the crash, presumably due to loss of electrical power.
2025-01-31	056	Jet Rescue Air Ambulance	Learjet 55	Castor Gardens, Philadelphia, Pennsylvania, U.S.	Accident	The CVR stopped recording several years before accident flight and did not record any data from it. The aircraft was not required to carry an FDR.
2025-03-17	018	Aerolínea Lanhsa	British Aerospace Jetstream 32	Near Juan Manuel Gálvez International Airport, Roatán, Honduras	Accident	The CVR has not yet been recovered. The aircraft was not required to carry an FDR.
2025-07-24	2311	Angara Airlines	Antonov An-24	Near Tynda, Amur Oblast, Russia	Accident	FDR destroyed by the post crash fire.
2026-07-07	1732	K2 Airways	Boeing 737-400SF	Arabian Sea, near Ormara, Pakistan	Accident	One of the flight recorders was recovered on 29 September 2026, while the other has not yet been found.
2026-11-01	2026 Palm Beach County Learjet 60 crash	privately owned	Learjet 60	Palm Beach County, Florida, United States	Under investigation	The flight data recorder (FDR) has not yet been found, while the cockpit voice recorder (CVR) was recovered on November 9.

== See also ==
- List of missing aircraft
- List of missing ships
