= Adeeb Youssef =

Sudanese politician and activist (born c. 1975)

Governor of Central Darfur
- In office 27 July 2020 – 25 October 2021
- Preceded by: Khalid Nural-Dayem
- Succeeded by: Saad Adam Babiker

Personal details
- Born: Adeeb Abdel Rahman Youssef c.1975 (age 50–51)
- Education: George Mason University
- Occupation: Human rights activist

Adeeb Abdel Rahman Youssef (born c. 1975) is a Sudanese human rights activist and former politician. From 2003 he documented evidence of atrocities in his native Darfur. For his activism he was imprisoned and tortured by Sudanese authorities. At one point he moved to the United States where he remained for several years and studied at George Mason University. After the Sudanese revolution he served as governor of Central Darfur from 27 July 2020 until his removal during the 2021 Sudanese coup d'état on 25 October 2021.

== Early life and humanitarian efforts ==
Youssef was born circa 1975. He is of Fur aristocratic descent. His father had two wives and Youssef had 22 siblings. Youssef grew up in Juldo in the Marrah Mountains, Darfur, Sudan. In April 2001 he was one of the co-founders of the Sudan Social Development Organization. He worked in rural areas and supported local communicaties in obtaining its rights versus the government. As a human rights activist he also planted medicinal trees and helped build schools and clinics. From 2003 onwards he visited 339 villages in Darfur to collect evidence of acts of violence and human rights abuses. He sent these photos to Amnesty International. The Sudanese security services subsequently took an interest in him. Youssef was detained at least twice in Sudan. He was imprisoned four months in a torture facility, while sharing a cell with nine others. He also spent two months in a bathroom in Kobar Prison. He also escaped assassination. At his first attempt to leave for the United States he had his passport and money seized.

In September 2008 he went to New York City, United States, for a lecture tour. He hoped to return Sudan swiftly, but by December the Sudanese government threatened his family and imprisoned a brother to question him about Adeeb. Youssef then spent time between Manhattan, Brooklyn and New Jersey. He ultimately remained in the United States for six years. Apart from his time in New York he later also spent time in San Francisco. In March 2009, after the indictment of Sudanese President Omar al-Bashir by the International Criminal Court Youssef stated "It’s a very happy day for every Darfurian”. His Sudan Social Development Organization was subsequently expelled from Sudan by al-Bashir. In June 2009 Youssef stated he had been tortured for 11 months in Darfur after revealing atrocities aimed against black Africans in the region. In 2018 Youssef obtained a PhD from the Jimmy and Rosalynn Carter School for Peace and Conflict Resolution at George Mason University.

Youssef was one of the developers of the Darfur Emergency Response Operation, which assists in programs for internally displaced persons (IDP) camps. Youssef has also served as general manager of the Darfur Reconciliation and Development Organization.

As of 2009, Youssef had lost 33 family members in the conflict in Darfur, including his grandmother whom he found burned in his home village. One of his close friends was killed by the Janjaweed.

== Political career ==
On 27 July 2020 Youssef was sworn in as Governor of Central Darfur in front of Abdel Fattah al-Burhan. His swearing-in coincided with that of 17 other governors. In August 2020 he visited mass graves of the war in Darfur. On 19 October 2020 Youssef met with Fatou Bensouda, the Prosecutor of the International Criminal Court, in the Corinthia Hotel Khartoum to discuss the International Criminal Court investigation in Darfur and especially the case of Ali Kushayb of whom the events took place in Central Darfur. Youssef stated that the location of the meeting, Sudan rather than The Hague or New York, was a victory for the victims. During November 2020 Youssef announced a campaign for disarmament of Central Darfur. On 31 December 2020 Youssef met with Anita Kiki Gbeho, the Deputy Joint Special Representative of United Nations–African Union Mission in Darfur (UNAMID), to discuss the winding down of the mission.

In January 2021 Youssef reportedly paid 170,000 Sudanese pound to avoid an attack from 200 Arabs on the Hamidiya internally displaced persons camp near Zalingei. In May 2021 Youssef criticized the appointment of Minni Minnawi as Darfur Regional Governor by Sudanese Prime Minister Abdalla Hamdok, calling it a hasty decision, which needed consultation. He feared the appointment would make peace negotiations with Abdul Wahid al Nur more difficult. The same month he accepted the handover of the UNAMID headquarters in Zalingei on behalf of the state of Sudan. In July 2021 he announced the discovery of three mass graves in Central Darfur, containing at least 76 victims. In July 2021 he also spoke with a panel of experts reporting to the United Nations Security Council, he indicated that in four locaties near the borders with Chad and the Central African Republic there were tensions which led to incursions between Sudan and Chad. At times the local population supported Chadian opposition groups. On 31 August 2021 students of the University of Zalingei protested at the former UNAMID site, as they tried to open the gates they were fired upon by security forces. The protesters then marched to the offices of Central Darfur's government where they hoped to speak to Youssef, who allegedly refused. They were once more fired upon, killing one student.

During the 2021 Sudanese coup d'état of 25 October Abdel Fattah al-Burhan sacked the governors of the states of Sudan. By November 2021 Youssef had certainly been ousted from his position. Saad Adam Babiker succeeded Youssef, he was dismissed himself in November 2023.

== Post-political career ==
In November 2021, Youssef together with Mohamed Hassan Al-Taishi, a former member of the Transitional Sovereignty Council, and the ousted Minister of Justice, Nasredeen Abdulbari spoke with European ambassadors to Sudan on steps to be taken to restore democracy.

In July 2022, commenting on the reported death of 168 individuals in Darfur, Youssef stated that: "the violence is the result of a communal conflict that was never resolved in all past peace agreements".

In May 2023, speaking with NPR, Youssef stated the victims in Darfur were being revictimized. He also feared that fighting in Sudan would lead to harmful effects on agriculture and possibly famine. In September 2023, commenting on the situation in Sudan, he stated that the departure of international organizations led to escalation in the fighting. He argued for international sanctions, against the fighting parties and the countries which supported them. Youssef left Darfur in November 2023, but vowed to return to resume giving aid. In November 2023 he stated that conflict in Sudan was more ethnical than political, with genocidal acts being committed and that the effects were worse than the previous war in Darfur with the humaniterian conditions suffering due to lack of foreign aid.
