= 2010 Tarco Air Antonov An-24 crash =

2010 aviation accident in Sudan

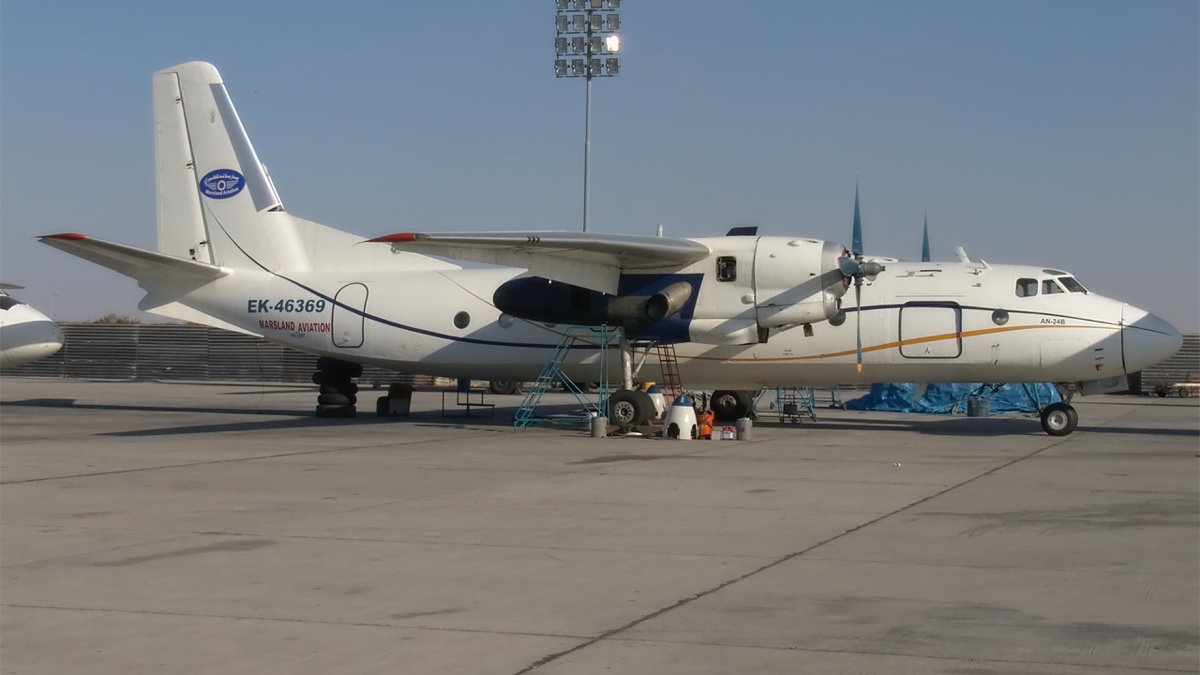
- The aircraft involved in the accident, while still in service with Marsland Aviation in 2004

Accident
- Date: 11 November 2010
- Summary: Pilot error
- Site: Zalingei Airport, Zalingei, Sudan; 12°56′40″N 23°33′47″E

Aircraft
- Aircraft type: Antonov An-24
- Operator: Tarco Air
- Registration: ST-ARQ
- Flight origin: Khartoum International Airport, Khartoum, Sudan
- Stopover: Nyala Airport, Nyala, Sudan
- Destination: Zalingei Airport, Zalingei, Sudan
- Occupants: 44
- Passengers: 38
- Crew: 6
- Fatalities: 2
- Injuries: 6
- Survivors: 42

On 11 November 2010, an Antonov An-24 passenger aircraft of Tarco Air on a domestic service from Khartoum to Zalingei, Sudan, crashed on landing at Zalingei Airport, bursting into flames on the runway. Two passengers died.

== Accident ==
The airplane had departed Khartoum International Airport at 13:27 on 11 November and, after a stopover at Nyala, arrived at Zalingei at 16:18, finding good weather conditions. The Antonov landed heavily on Zalingei's dirt runway 03, bounced and made another heavy contact with the ground, causing the landing gear and engines to shear off. Fuel from the ruptured wings ignited, and the resulting fire consumed most of the wreckage.

== Aircraft ==
The aircraft involved was a twin-turboprop Antonov An-24 with Sudanese registration ST-ARQ. It was built in 1970.

== Investigation ==
Sudan's Air Accident Investigation Central Directorate (SAAICD) conducted an investigation into the crash. It found that the flight data recorder did not contain any data, and that the cockpit voice recorder contained only four minutes of recording, of which none where from the accident flight.

The SAAICD attributed the accident to the flight crew's poor performance and co-ordination in executing the landing. Four safety recommendations were made.
