= Sudan Social Development Organization =

Logo

The Sudan Social Development Organization (SUDO) is a Sudanese non-profit organisation working in Sudan, with offices located around the country, aiding civilians affected by conflicts and internally displaced persons. The organisation describes itself as being dedicated to the promotion of human rights and international development.

== Projects and partnerships ==
As of 2006, SUDO is engaged in seven major projects, six of which are partnerships with other organisations working in the region.

=== North Darfur ===
In North Darfur, a partnership with Kids To Kids helps to provide safe drinking water to people and cattle by digging water wells and supplying pumps. With aid from the British Embassy, SUDO built a health centre to provide basic health care to residents of the Zam Zam IDP camp.

=== South and West Darfur ===
In South Darfur and West Darfur, a partnership with Norwegian Church Aid to provide basic health services, sanitation, and safe drinking water. A partnership with Trócaire helps to provide shelter to people in the Mershing IDP camp by constructing huts from locally sourced materials. Another partnership with Norwegian Church Aid, along with Caritas, Sudanaid and the Sudan Council of Churches, helps residents of the towns of Nyala and Zalingei who have been affected my militia attacks.

=== West Kurdufan ===
In West Kurdufan a partnership with Concern Worldwide with aid from the French embassy aims to reduce conflicts over water and to promote human rights.

== Sudanese government actions ==
Amnesty International has recorded a series of attack on SUDO by the Sudanese government and by armed militias operating within Sudan.

Dr Mudawi Ibrahim Adam, the organisation's director, was arrested at his home in December 2003 after a visit to Darfur. He was charged with crimes against the state, which carried the possibility of being sentenced to death, but charges were dropped in August 2004.

In September 2004 Adeeb Yousif, director the SUDO's Zalengei branch, was arrested and held, first at an unofficial detention centre near Kober Prison in Khartoum and then at Debek prison North of Khartoum, until 19 April 2005.

On 29 September 2005 the Sudan Liberation Army abducted three members of SUDO at the Zam Zam IDP camp.

In March 2003 the Sudanese government closed two of the organisation's offices and froze its bank accounts.

== Closing of SUDO and 2010 Mudawi trials ==
On 5 March 2009, the same day that President Omar al-Bashir was indicted by the International Criminal Court, the Sudanese government ordered the closure of SUDO, and its offices were taken over by state security forces. The New York Times reported that the letter closing the offices "came from the Humanitarian Affairs Commission, which is run by Ahmed Haroun, one of the people facing an arrest warrant from the International Criminal Court for mass slaughter in Darfur." Mudawi and the organization appealed their closure in court, winning the appeal in April 2010. However, according to a 2011 SUDO press release, the organization remains effectively closed: "in Sudan you can win a case but nothing changes. SUDO’s offices remained locked, its assets remained frozen, and the organization in Sudan was not allowed to resume operations."

At the same time, Mudawi faced repeated trials for "financial mismanagement" of SUDO's resources. He was initially acquitted of these charges on 5 March 2010, but the case's judge, Abdel Monim Mohammed Saleim, reversed the acquittal on 22 December, re-imprisoning Mudawi. He was sentenced to "one year imprisonment and a fine of £S.3,000 (US$1,250) for financial mismanagement" Mudawi was released on 25 January with notice that the time he had served had been sufficient; however, as of January 2011, the charges against him remain, and Amnesty International continues to name him a prisoner of conscience.
