= Flight 742 =

Flight 742 may refer to:

- Viasa Flight 742, crashed on 16 March 1969
- TWA Flight 742, crashed on 28 August 1969
- Iran Air Flight 742, made an emergency landing on 18 October 2011
