= 2013 Kenn Borek Air DHC-6 crash =

2013 aviation accident in Antarctica

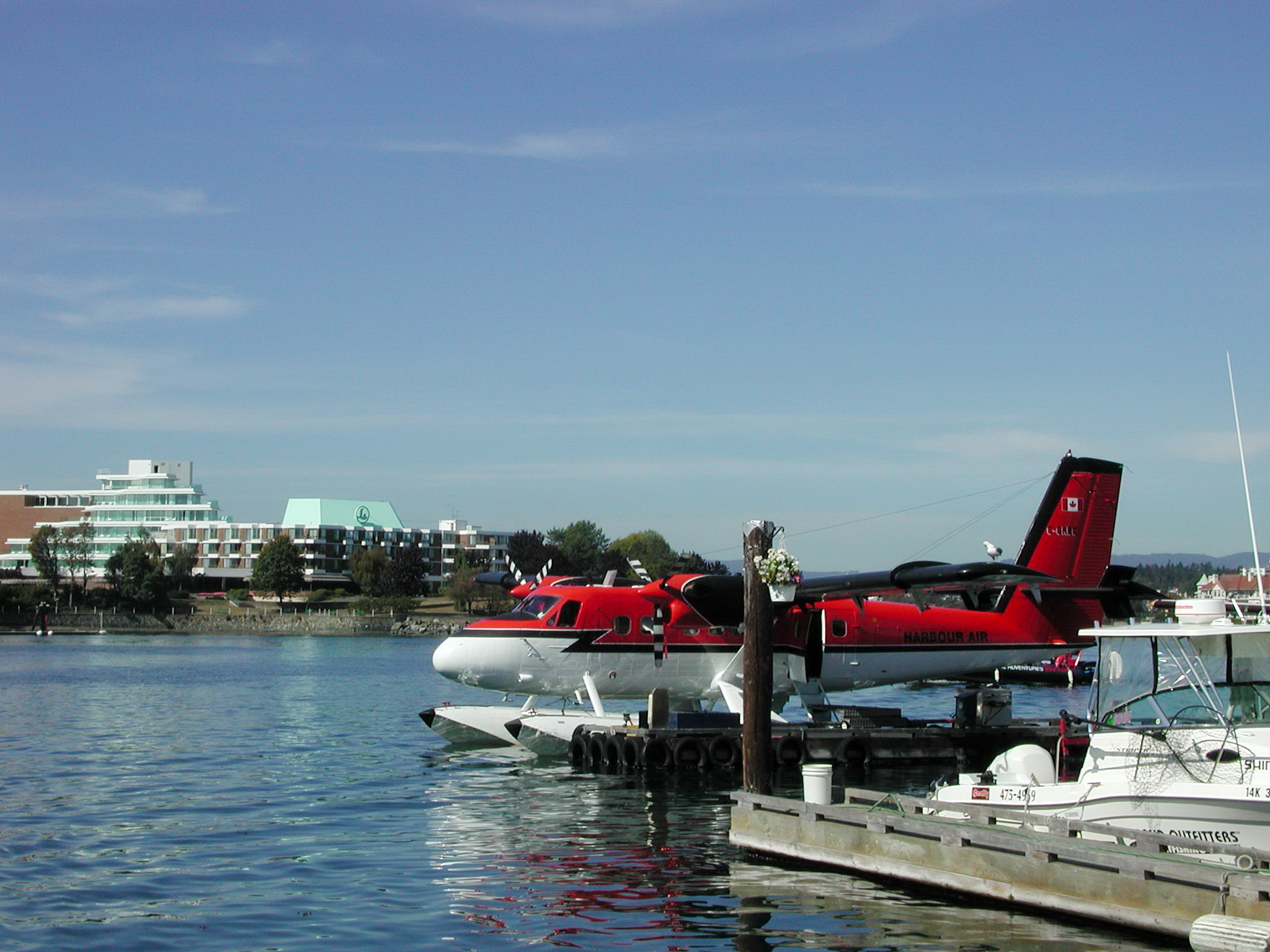
- C-GKBC, the aircraft involved in the accident, pictured in 2001

Accident
- Date: 23 January 2013
- Summary: Controlled flight into terrain, due to pilot error
- Site: Mount Elizabeth, Antarctica; 83°55′12″S 168°45′54″E

Aircraft
- Aircraft type: de Havilland Canada DHC-6 Twin Otter 300
- Operator: Kenn Borek Air
- Registration: C-GKBC
- Flight origin: Jack F. Paulus Skiway, Amundsen–Scott South Pole Station, Antarctica
- Destination: Zucchelli Station, Antarctica
- Occupants: 3
- Crew: 3
- Fatalities: 3
- Survivors: 0

On 23 January, 2013, a Kenn Borek Air de Havilland Canada DHC-6 Twin Otter 300, operating a ferry flight in Antarctica from Jack F. Paulus Skiway, at the Amundsen–Scott South Pole Station, to the Zucchelli Station, crashed into the side of Mount Elizabeth. All three crew members on board were killed. An investigation into the accident found out that the pilots turned the plane too early, entering an area of adverse weather and putting the aircraft into a collision course with the mountain.

== Background ==
=== Aircraft ===
The aircraft involved in the accident was a de Havilland Canada DHC-6 Twin Otter 300 registered as C-GKBC, and manufactured in 1979. For this flight the plane's passenger seats were removed to install a fuel system, used to improve the aircraft's range during the ferry flight.

=== Crew ===
Since it was a ferry flight there were only three crew members on board the aircraft, and no passengers. The captain was 55 years old Bob Heat, he had a total of 22300 flight hours, of which 7700 were on the Twin Otter; the first officer was 25 years old Mike Denton, he had a total of 790 flight hours, of which 450 on this aircraft type, unlike the captain this was his first season flying in Antarctica. The third crew member was the aircraft's crew chief, 36 years old Perry Andersen, who was responsible for the plane maintenance.

== Accident ==
=== Flight ===
The aircraft, which was to be used for the Italian polar research programme, was scheduled to be ferried from the Amundsen–Scott South Pole Station to the Zucchelli Station. The take off went uneventfully, then the aircraft climbed to FL110 and started heading north. The plane cruised this way for a while, until it descended to FL091 and made a 32 degrees turn at 7:25 am UTC, as the beginning of the approach procedure. About 20 minutes later the aircraft climbed again, to FL125 and, at 8:01 am, the last communication with the aircraft occurred, as it was flying over the Queen Alexandra Range; the position report scheduled for 8:27 was not received.

=== Search and rescue ===
Multiple teams were deployed for the search and rescue mission and airplanes, including an Air National Guard Lockheed C-130 Hercules, two other Kenn Borek Air aircraft, a Douglas DC-3 and a DHC-6, and helicopters, a Bell 212 and a Eurocopter AS350, were flown over the last known location of the missing flight, in an effort to locate it. Adverse weather conditions made the operation difficult, and the missing Twin Otter was located only on 26 January, by an aircraft of the Rescue Coordination Centre New Zealand. The aircraft was found crashed on Mount Elizabeth at an height of about 3960 meters. None of the three crew members on board survived. After locating the wreckage a team, made up of six rescuers, was sent to the crash site. They recovered some wreckage, some objects and the aircraft's cockpit voice recorder, but, due to the adverse weather conditions and the risk of avalanches, they weren't able to recover any victims' body. Authorities stated that a second operation to try recovering the victims could be attempted in October 2013, but in the end the mission was not done.

== Investigation ==
Since the plane was registered in Canada and owned by a canadian airline, the Transportation Safety Board of Canada started the investigation on the accident. The final report on the crash was released in 2014 and attributed the main cause of the accident to errors of the pilots, which turned left too early, leading the aircraft in an area with a higher minimum safe altitude, leading to a controlled flight into terrain. Cloudy weather in the area was also cited as a factor. Also the plane's ground proximity warning system relied on an electronic database that hadn't available data for Antarctica, making the system less effective in the area. But, given the fact that the cockpit voice recorder although recovered was unusable, the investigators couldn't determine with more precision why the pilots did the turn, and if they tried to recover the situation in some way.

== Aftermath ==
After the crash the United States National Science Foundation and Antarctic Program sent condolences to the families of the victims. The team of rescuers which located and reached the crash site was awarded with the New Zealand Search and Rescue Awards in 2014. Following the crash Kenn Borek Air improved its Antarctica navigational charts, in order to ensure more safety during risky missions in the region.

== See also ==
- Mount Erebus disaster
- List of unrecovered and unusable flight recorders
