= 2003 Ukrainian Cargo Airways Ilyushin Il-76 accident =

2003 aviation accident

Coordinates: 06°09′S 23°36′E

2003 Ukrainian Cargo Airways Il-76 accident
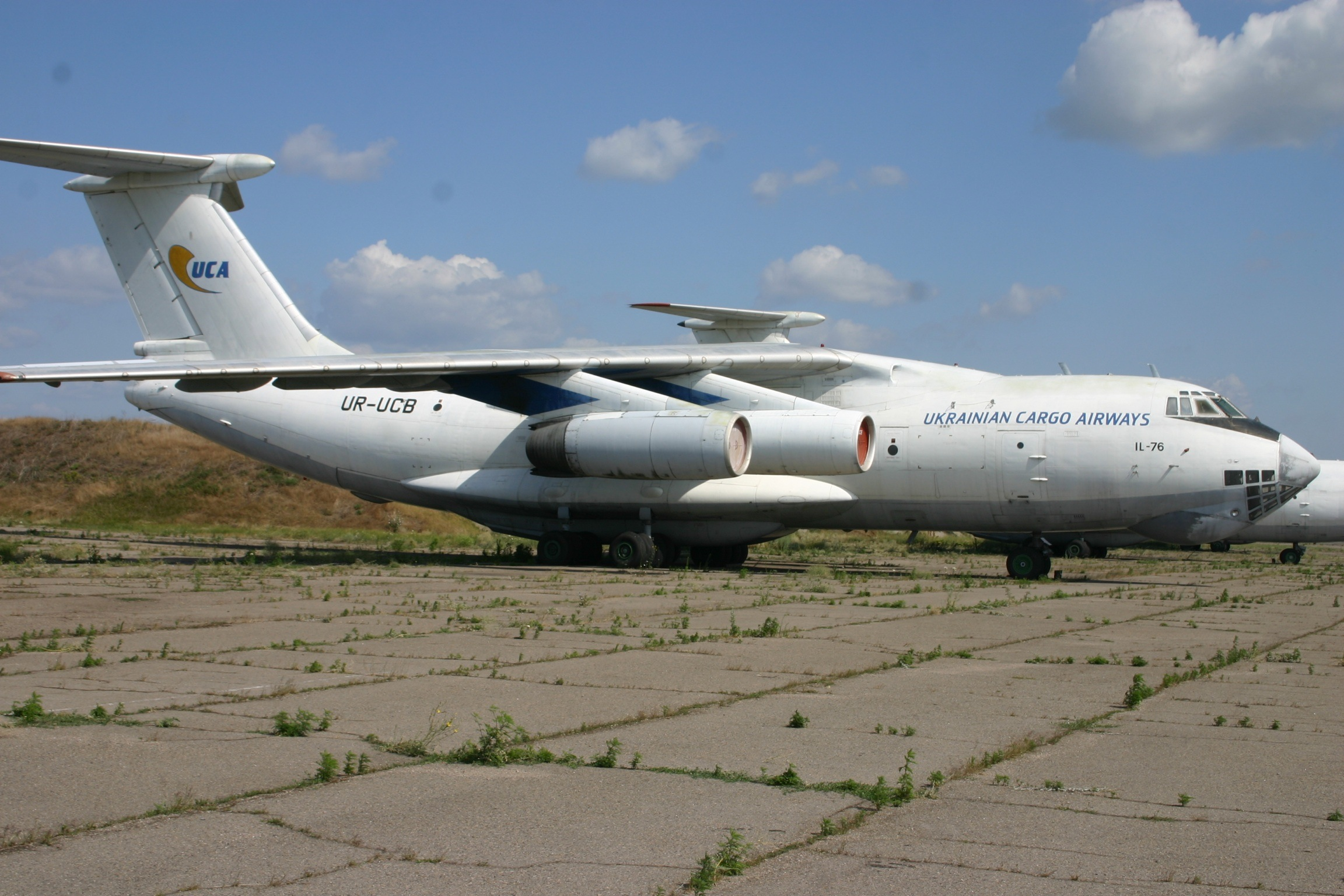
- The aircraft involved in the accident, photographed in 2007

Accident
- Date: 8 May 2003
- Summary: Explosive decompression following opening of cargo door mid-flight
- Site: Over Mbuji-Mayi, Democratic Republic of the Congo

Aircraft
- Aircraft type: Ilyushin Il-76MD
- Operator: Ukrainian Cargo Airways
- Registration: UR-UCB
- Flight origin: Kinshasa, Democratic Republic of the Congo
- Destination: Lubumbashi International Airport, Lubumbashi, Democratic Republic of the Congo
- Passengers: 160 – 350+
- Crew: 6
- Fatalities: 17 (Government officials); 60 (officials estimation); 129 (airport officials); 200 (survivors)
- Injuries: Unknown
- Survivors: At least 40

On 8 May 2003, an Ilyushin Il-76MD operated by Ukrainian Cargo Airways suffered an explosive decompression following the opening of the cargo door in mid-air while flying over Mbuji-Mayi. The aircraft was conducting a civilian transport flight from Kinshasa to Lubumbashi. Death toll estimates vary widely from 17 to 200. There were more than 160 people on board, of which, seventeen were confirmed dead by the Congolese government, while other officials estimated the deaths to be 60, 129 or 170 and some survivors claimed that as many as 200 people were killed.

== Accident ==
The incident occurred above the city of Mbuji-Mayi on the night of 8 May 2003. The aircraft was an Ilyushin Il-76 registered as UR-UCB and was operated by Ukrainian Cargo Airways, a Ukrainian state-owned charter airline company based in Kyiv. The two-hour flight was chartered by the military to transport soldiers and their families to Lubumbashi, home to a large Congolese military base and located in the south of the country in Haut-Katanga Province. The cargo compartment was full of passengers; many were sleeping in the middle section and near the cargo door. The aircraft had no proper seating, and there were only folding chairs in the cabin, with people "crammed onto benches and on the floor."

About 45 minutes after takeoff from Kinshasa, at an altitude of 10,000 feet (3,000 m), the cargo door of the Ilyushin Il-76 suddenly opened, blowing many passengers out of the aircraft. Several people were clinging to ropes, bags and netting on the interior wall of the plane. Survivors described the scene as chaotic, with passengers screaming and flying out of the open door. Several people who had been sleeping were awakened by other passengers' screams. They also claimed that the plane suddenly tilted to the left and right, causing more people to be ejected. Several people who had clung onto ropes lost their grips and were blown out to their deaths. A secured truck on the cargo hold may have saved many lives as it may have acted as a barrier.

One survivor described the commotion: "I was just next to the door and I had the chance to grab onto a ladder just before the door let loose." Another said, "I saw a soldier cradling a baby and a mother with a baby near the door suddenly just being wrenched into the darkness."

The aircraft managed to return to Kinshasa after the incident. The Congolese government ordered an immediate search for the passengers who had been blown out of the aircraft. Survivors claimed that many people had disappeared after the incident, and stated that as many as 200 people, including women and children, were killed in the incident. Ukrainian defence ministry spokesman Konstantin Khyvrenko stated that no one was hurt in the accident, but survivors stated that many were injured by flying baggage and cargo. At least two pregnant women experienced miscarriages resulting from shock. The government only confirmed the deaths of 17 people, while officials estimated that as many as 60 may have been killed and airport officials placed the number of fatalities at 129. Aviation officials and western diplomats in Congo estimated that at least 170 people were killed in the incident. Of the more than 160 passengers in the cargo compartment, only about 40% returned to the airport. Airport sources told news agencies that only the crew survived the accident.

== Investigation ==
An investigation was ordered immediately after the disaster. Information minister Kikaya Bin Karubi told Reuters that the Congolese Air Force and Army were investigating to determine whether the accident was the result of human error or a mechanical problem. Sergeant Kabmba Kashala said that the aircraft had taken off with the door improperly fastened and that the door had flung open after three failed attempts to fully shut it mid-flight. The pilot suggested that the door had opened either after one of the passengers tinkered with its controls, or because of a computer glitch. He stated that a passenger could have been "touching the button for special opening device".
