= Jack F. Paulus Skiway =

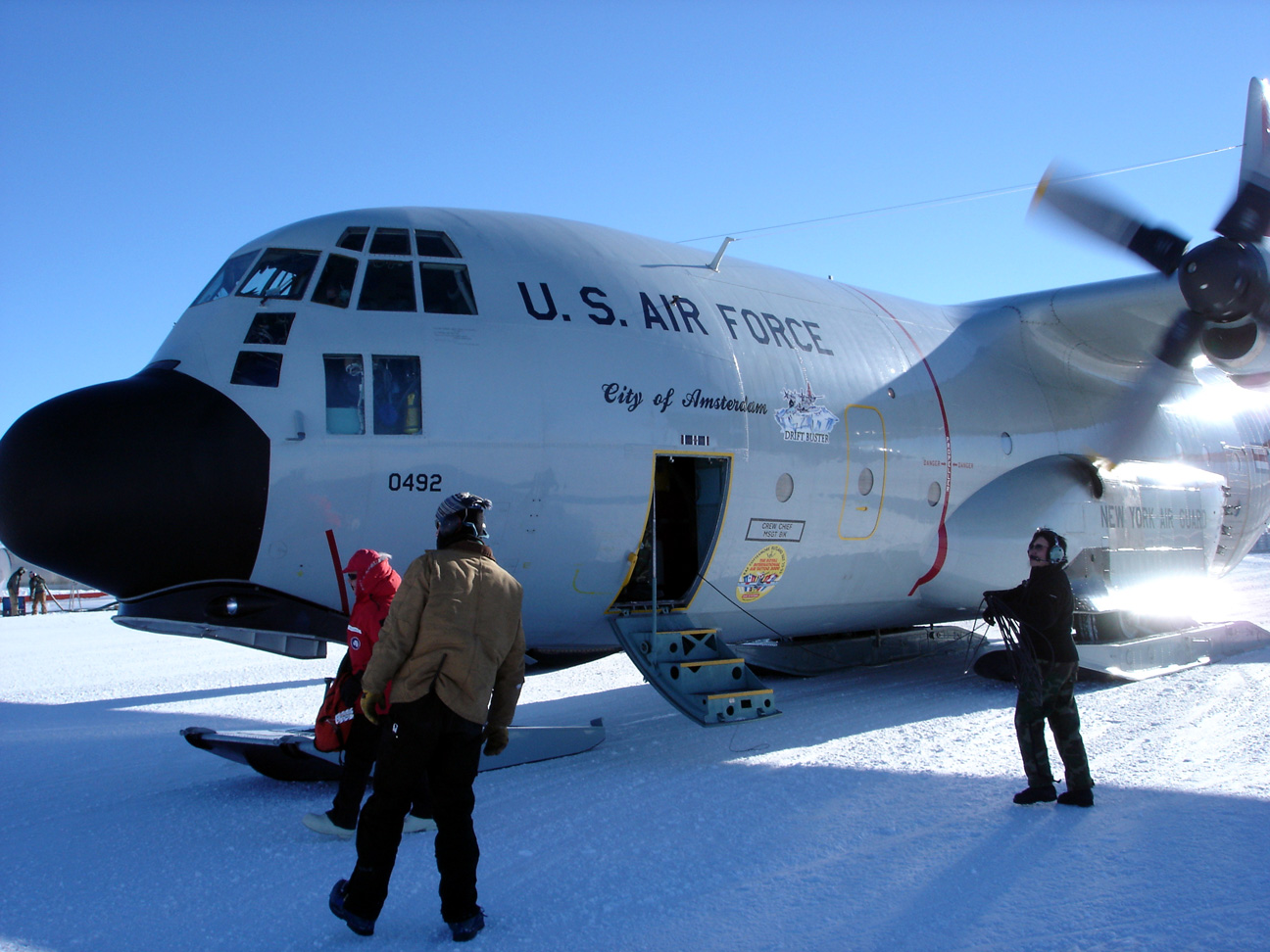
- The South Pole cargo crew unloads passengers from an LC-130. In order to prevent lubricating oil, hydraulic fluids, and fuel from freezing, the engines are kept running while the plane is on the ground.
- IATA: none; ICAO: NZSP

Summary
- Serves: Amundsen–Scott South Pole Station
- Location: South Pole, Antarctica
- Elevation AMSL: 9,300 ft / 2,835 m
- Coordinates: 89°59′22″S 1°0′0″W

Map
- Location of airfield in Antarctica

Runways
Direction	Length		Surface
Direction	ft	m	Surface
02/20	12,000	3,658	Snow

The Jack F. Paulus Skiway (ICAO: NZSP) is an airport located at Amundsen–Scott South Pole Station at the South Pole.

The station has a runway for aircraft, 3658 m / 12000 ft long. Between October and February, there are several flights per week of ski-equipped LC-130 Hercules aircraft from McMurdo Station to supply the station. Additionally, Kenn Borek Air Twin Otters and DC-3s visit the base in support of science and logistics. Resupply missions are collectively termed Operation Deep Freeze.

Dimensional cargo capacity of the Hercules aircraft must be considered for all of the station's logistical support. Large scientific experiments and structures such as the new station are broken down into modular pieces and reassembled on-site. Limitations and cost of the Hercules aircraft have been cited by the National Science Foundation as one of the main reasons for the McMurdo–South Pole traverse over-ice ground supply route.

== Etymology ==
Jack F. Paulus was a pilot who had nine deployments in Antarctica between 1969 and 1981.

== See also ==
- List of airports in Antarctica
