= Allied Air =

Cargo airline based in Lagos, Nigeria

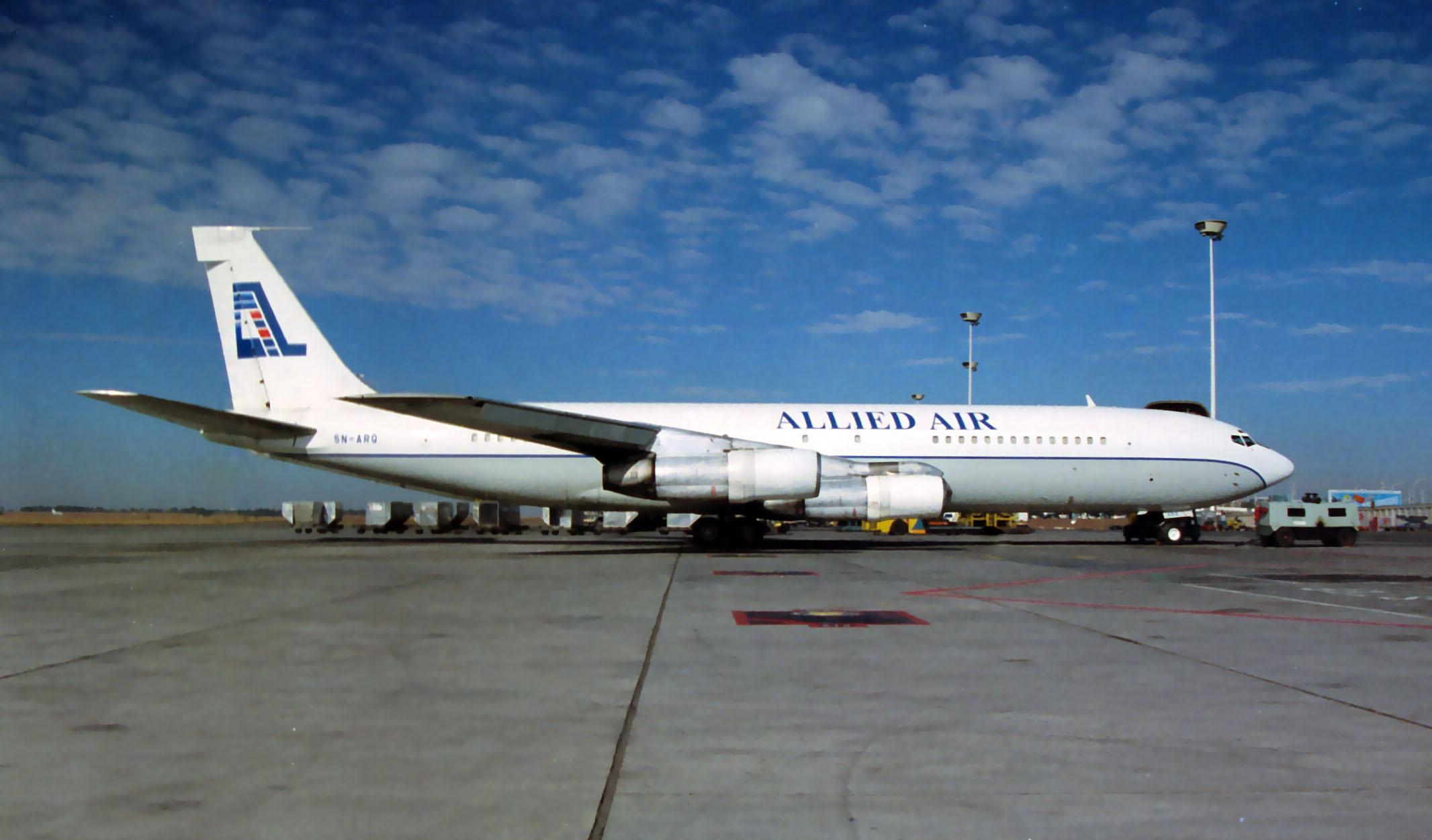
IATA	ICAO	Call sign
4W	AJK	BAMBI
- Founded: 1998
- Hubs: Murtala Mohammed International Airport
- Fleet size: 4
- Headquarters: Lagos, Nigeria
- Key people: Val Tongo (CEO)
- Website: www.alliedairng.com

Allied Air is a cargo airline based in Lagos, Nigeria. It operates scheduled and charter services in Nigeria and throughout Africa. Its main base is Murtala Mohammed International Airport, Lagos.

== History ==
The airline was established in 1998. The Nigerian Civil Aviation Authority (NCAA) set a deadline of April 30, 2007 for all airlines operating in the country to re-capitalise or be grounded. Allied Air successfully re-capitalised and was registered for operation.

== Destinations ==
Key scheduled destinations include Accra, Freetown, Monrovia, Entebbe, and Malabo. It also has regular services to Liege.

== Fleet ==
As of August 2025, Allied Air operates the following aircraft:

Allied Air Fleet
Aircraft	In Fleet	Notes
Boeing 737-400SF	3	1 operating for DHL Aviation
Boeing 737-800SF	1	
Total	4	

The airline used to operate Boeing 727-200Fs and one was written off in an accident on June 2, 2012.

== Accidents and incidents ==
- On June 2, 2012, a Boeing 727-200F, operating as Flight 111, overshot the runway as it landed at Kotoka International Airport in the Ghanaian city of Accra after flying from Lagos, Nigeria. The plane continued through the airport boundary fence and across a main road, hitting a minivan. 10 people in the minivan were killed outright. The plane's four crew suffered minor injuries.
- On December 11, 2024, a Boeing 737-400F, operating as Flight 206, suffered a runway excursion while landing at Nnamdi Azikiwe International Airport in Abuja, causing substantial damage to the aircraft but no injuries to the five crew members.
