= Ukrainian Cargo Airways =

Ukrainian airline

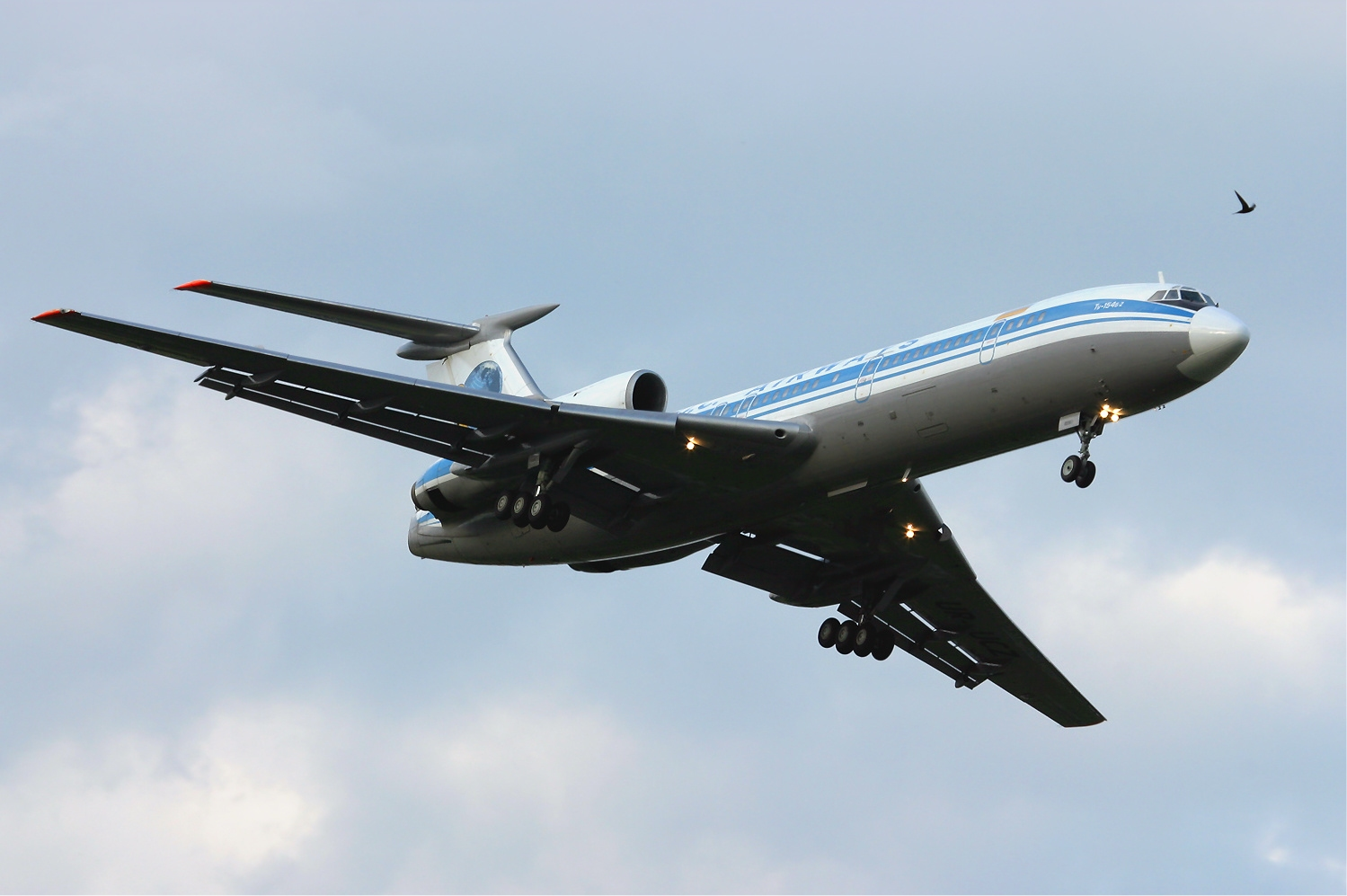
IATA	ICAO	Call sign
6Z	UKS	CARGOTRANS
- Founded: 1997
- Ceased operations: 2009
- Hubs: Boryspil International Airport; Zaporizhzhia International Airport
- Fleet size: 27
- Headquarters: Kyiv, Ukraine

Ukrainian Cargo Airways was an airline based in Kyiv, Ukraine. It was a state-owned company operating charter passenger and cargo services. It also overhauled, leased and sold aircraft, engines and aviation equipment. Its main bases were Kyiv Boryspil International Airport (KBP) and Zaporizhzhia International Airport (OZH).

== History ==
The airline was established in July 1997 and started operations in January 1998 using decommissioned aircraft of the Ukrainian air force. Since 1998, UCA have been used to fulfil UN programmes in Yugoslavia (Kosovo) and Africa (Sierra Leone, Sudan and the Democratic Republic of the Congo) to deliver relief cargo, transport peacekeeping troops and evacuate refugees. It is 100% owned by the State Property Fund of Ukraine. The airline was shut down by the Ukrainian civil aviation authority over safety concerns in 2009. The carrier had also been blacklisted by the European Union.

=== Banned Status ===
Ukrainian Cargo Airways had appeared on the list of prohibited E.U. air carriers which means that it was banned for safety reasons from operating services of any kind within the E.U. In November 2009 the European Commission removed Ukrainian Cargo Airways from this list.

== Fleet ==
The Ukrainian Cargo Airways fleet consisted of the following aircraft (at August 2006):

- 3 Antonov An-12
- 2 Antonov An-26
- 19 Ilyushin Il-76MD
- 2 Ilyushin Il-76
- 1 Tupolev Tu-154B-2

== Incidents ==
- On 8 May 2003, a chartered Ukrainian Cargo Airways Ilyushin Il-76, en route from Kinshasa to Lubumbashi carrying an unknown number of soldiers and their families suffered a violent uncontrolled decompression when the cargo door accidentally opened at altitude causing, blowing an unknown number of people to their deaths. Survivors had to cling to ropes and netting on the plane. The plane managed to return to Kinshasa with about 40 survivors. Death estimates vary from zero (Ukrainian government), 17, 60 and 129 by various officials and as many as 200 people by some survivors.
- On 4 October 2007, a Canadian Forces chartered Ukrainian Cargo Airways Ilyushin Il-76 flying from Keflavik International Airport, Iceland struck some trees while on approach to CFB Trenton. The aircraft managed to land safely, but initially, the incident was not reported by the flight crew until base officials noticed wood debris on the runway and went to inspect the aircraft. The inspection revealed marks on the belly of the aircraft from the impact, and minor damage to the main landing gear.

== In the Media ==
A Ukrainian Cargo Airways Ilyushin Il-76 was seen in the third series of Auf Wiedersehen, Pet, being used to smuggle drugs inside Lada cars.
