= United Airlines Flight 826 =

1997 aviation accident over the Pacific Ocean

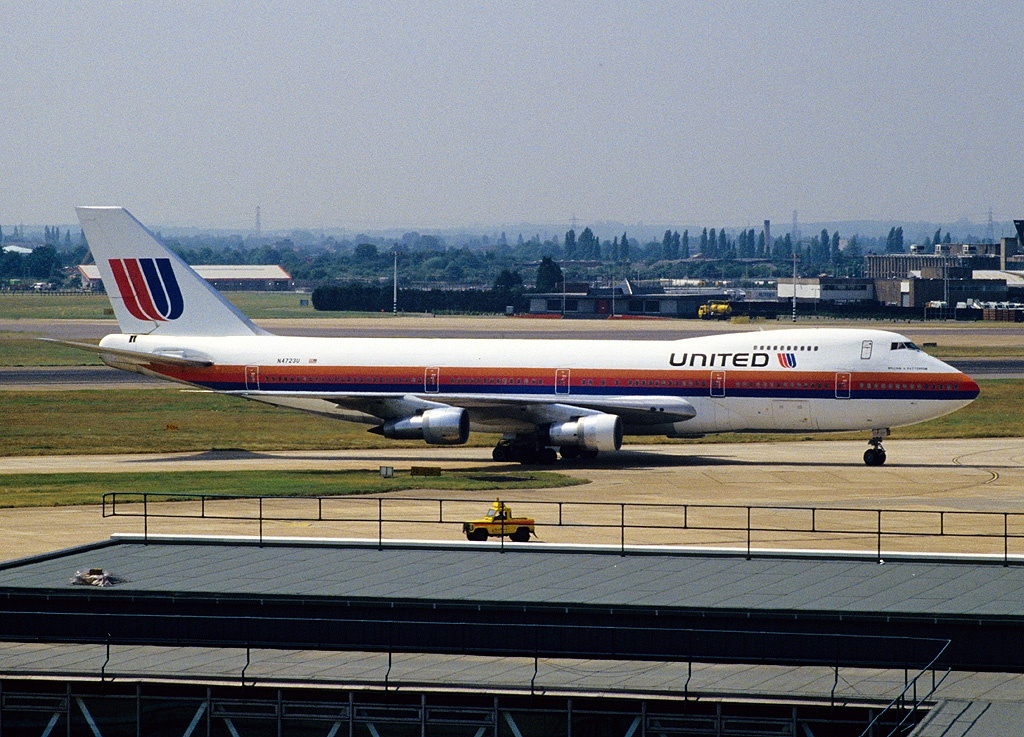
- N4723U, the aircraft involved in the accident, seen in 1992

Accident
- Date: December 28, 1997
- Summary: Clear-air turbulence
- Site: Pacific Ocean

Aircraft
- Aircraft type: Boeing 747-122
- Aircraft name: William A. Patterson
- Operator: United Airlines
- IATA flight No.: UA826
- ICAO flight No.: UAL826
- Call sign: UNITED 826
- Registration: N4723U
- Flight origin: New Tokyo International Airport (now known as Narita Airport)
- Destination: Honolulu International Airport, Hawaii
- Occupants: 393
- Passengers: 374
- Crew: 19
- Fatalities: 1
- Injuries: 102
- Survivors: 392

On December 28, 1997, United Airlines Flight 826 was operated by a Boeing 747-100 flying from New Tokyo International Airport (Narita), Japan to Honolulu International Airport, Hawaii. Two hours into the flight, at an altitude of 31,000 feet (9,400 m), the plane received reports of severe clear-air turbulence in the area and the seat belt sign was turned on. Moments later, the aircraft suddenly dropped around 100 feet (30 m), seriously injuring 15 passengers and 3 crew members. The plane turned around and landed safely back in Tokyo, but one passenger, a 32-year-old Japanese woman, died.

== Background ==
=== Aircraft ===
The aircraft involved, manufactured in 1971, was a Boeing 747-122 registered as N4723U. It was powered by four Pratt & Whitney JT9D-7A engines.

=== Crew ===
Flight 826 was piloted by an experienced cockpit crew. The captain had around 15,000 flight hours, including 1,100 hours on the Boeing 747. The first officer had around 10,000 hours, including 1,500 hours on the Boeing 747, and the flight engineer had around 3,500 hours of flight time, including 850 hours in the Boeing 747. The cabin crew ranged from 8 to 34 years in seniority.

== Flight details ==
Flight 826 departed Tokyo's Narita airport on December 28, 1997, at 20:30 local time. It reached a cruising altitude of 31,000 feet (9,400 m) just under a half-hour later. The flight was originally planned to cruise at 35,000 feet (11,000 m), but air traffic control (ATC) only cleared to cruise at the lower altitude due to air traffic. The captain chose the only authorized route at the time on which severe turbulence or thunderstorms were not forecast to occur.

At cruising altitude, the flight initially encountered enough turbulence for the captain to turn on the "fasten seat belt" sign. Fifteen minutes later, the turbulence subsided and the fasten seatbelt sign was switched off. At the time the captain announced to the passengers that turbulence was still a possibility and that the seat belts should be fastened when seated. A flight attendant made the same announcement in Japanese.

About an hour later, after calm conditions, the "fasten seat belt sign" came on again without any announcement. After about two minutes of not very strong turbulence, suddenly the 747 dropped slightly then shot back up and then back down at such a velocity that a purser, who was hanging on to a fixed countertop, found himself hanging upside down holding the countertop with his feet in the air. The airplane then pitched up and steeply climbed before heavily falling again, this occurring when the right wing dropped sharply. After another moderate climb, the flight returned to normal.

After the accident, a Japanese woman who had her belt unfastened was found lying unconscious and bleeding heavily in the aisle. Despite quick resuscitation efforts by injured flight attendants and a passenger doctor, she was soon pronounced dead.

Fifteen passengers and three flight attendants had spine and neck fractures. Another 87 other passengers had bruises, sprains and other minor injuries. While Henderson Field on Midway Atoll was the closest airport, the captain opted to return to Tokyo after assessing the aircraft was still flightworthy, and Tokyo had medical facilities judged better to handle the injuries.

Three hours later, the aircraft landed safely at Narita Airport.

== NTSB investigation and aftermath ==
The flight data recorder, as analyzed by the National Transportation Safety Board (NTSB), found that the sensors had initially recorded a peak normal acceleration of 1.814g in the first sharp ascent. Then the data showed that the aircraft had an out of control roll by 18° and then plunged to an extreme negative G of -0.824g.

The NTSB investigation found a potential issue that could have prevented the death and many injuries. Nobody could remember hearing the typical "fasten seat belt" chime when the fasten seat belt light came on about two minutes before the turbulence event and no announcements of the "fasten seat belt" light being on were made in either English or Japanese.

As a result of the accident, United Airlines released a bulletin entitled Turbulence Encounter and Passenger Fatality which went into detail on the events of Flight 826 and emphasized the importance of effective communication. The airline also took measures to enforce its policy of encouraging passengers to keep their seat belts fastened even if the seat belt sign is off.

United Airlines had previously intended to sell the aging aircraft to a salvage company in early 1998. After this accident, the airline opted to retire the aircraft soon afterwards with Flight 826 being its last revenue flight. It was ferried to Las Vegas McCarran International Airport in January 1998 and scrapped later that year.

== See also ==
- TWA Flight 742
- Singapore Airlines Flight 321
