= Zalingei Airport =

- IATA: ZLX; ICAO: HSZA

Summary
- Serves: Zalingei, Central Darfur, Sudan
- Location: Sudan
- Elevation AMSL: 2,953 ft / 900 m
- Coordinates: 12°56′40″N 023°33′47″E

Map
- Location of the airport in Sudan

Runways
Direction	Length		Surface
Direction	m	ft	Surface
04L/22R	1,600	5,249
- Sources: GCM, STV

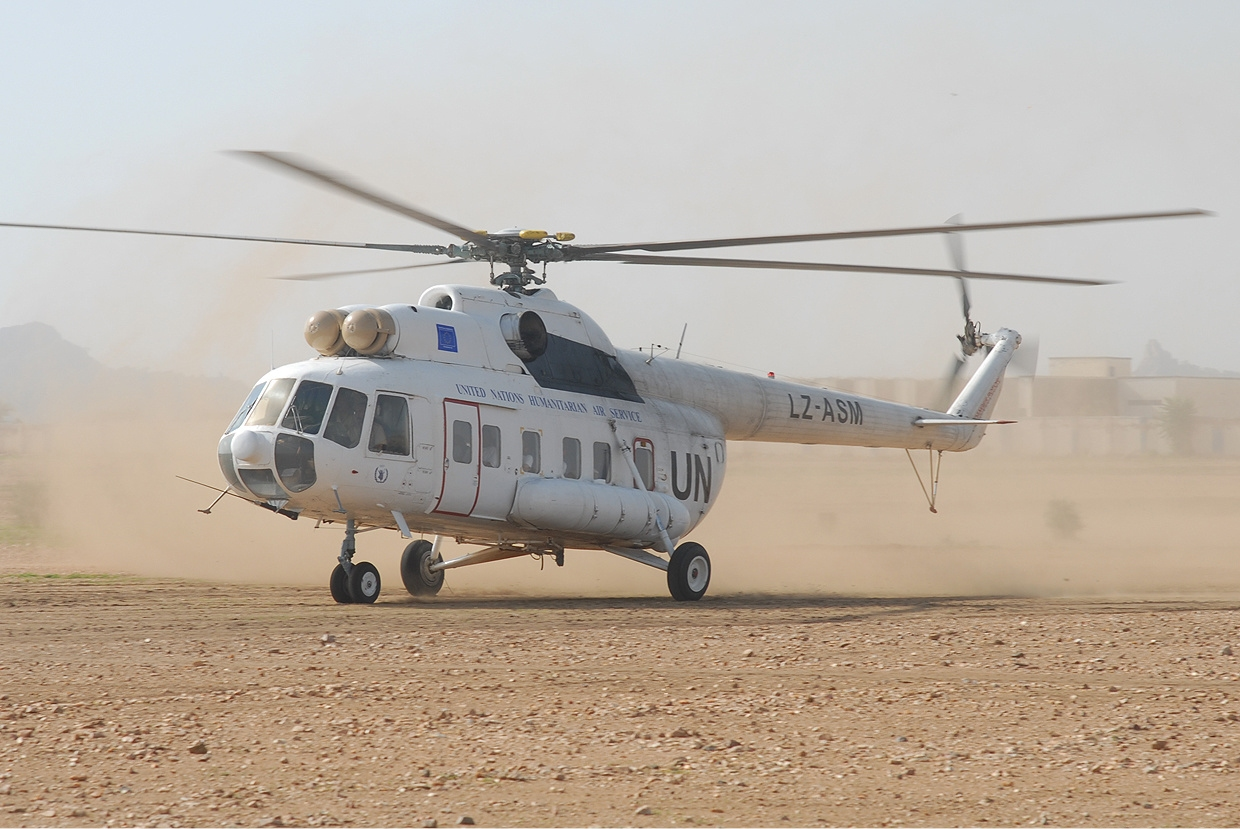
UNHAS (Heli Air Services) Mil Mi-8

Zalingei Airport (IATA: ZLX, ICAO: HSZA) is an airport serving the city of Zalingei in Central Darfur, Sudan.

== Accidents and incidents ==
- On 11 November 2010, an Antonov An-24 of Tarco Airlines on a flight from Khartoum crashed and caught fire on the runway on landing. Two of the 44 people on board were killed.
