= Sudan Civil Aviation Authority =

The Sudan Civil Aviation Authority (Arabic: الهيئة العامة للطيران المدني) is the civil aviation authority of Sudan. The head office is in Khartoum but due to the ongoing war in khartoum has been moved temporarily to Port Sudan .

The Air Accident Investigation Central Directorate, a part of the CAA, is the air accident investigation agency of Sudan.

== Air Navigation Center ==
The Air Control Center, part of the Air Navigation Center (ANC, Arabic: مركز الملاحة الجوية) department, serves as the country's air navigation building. It is located on a 25,600 square metres (276,000 sq ft) area east of Khartoum International Airport. This center includes multiple buildings: the main building, and a secondary building which houses the administration premises and the air traffic control simulator. The main building houses the equipment room, the area control centre, and the central maintenance centre.

It was established after a 1996 seminar on the future of air navigation held by the civil aviation authorities of Sudan. This seminar recommended the establishment of a new air navigation centre. On 3 May 2005 the Sudanese government signed a contract with "Fo-Hong", a Chinese company, to have the centre built.

== Investigations ==
- Sudan Airways Flight 109
