= Allied Air Flight 111 =

2012 aviation accident

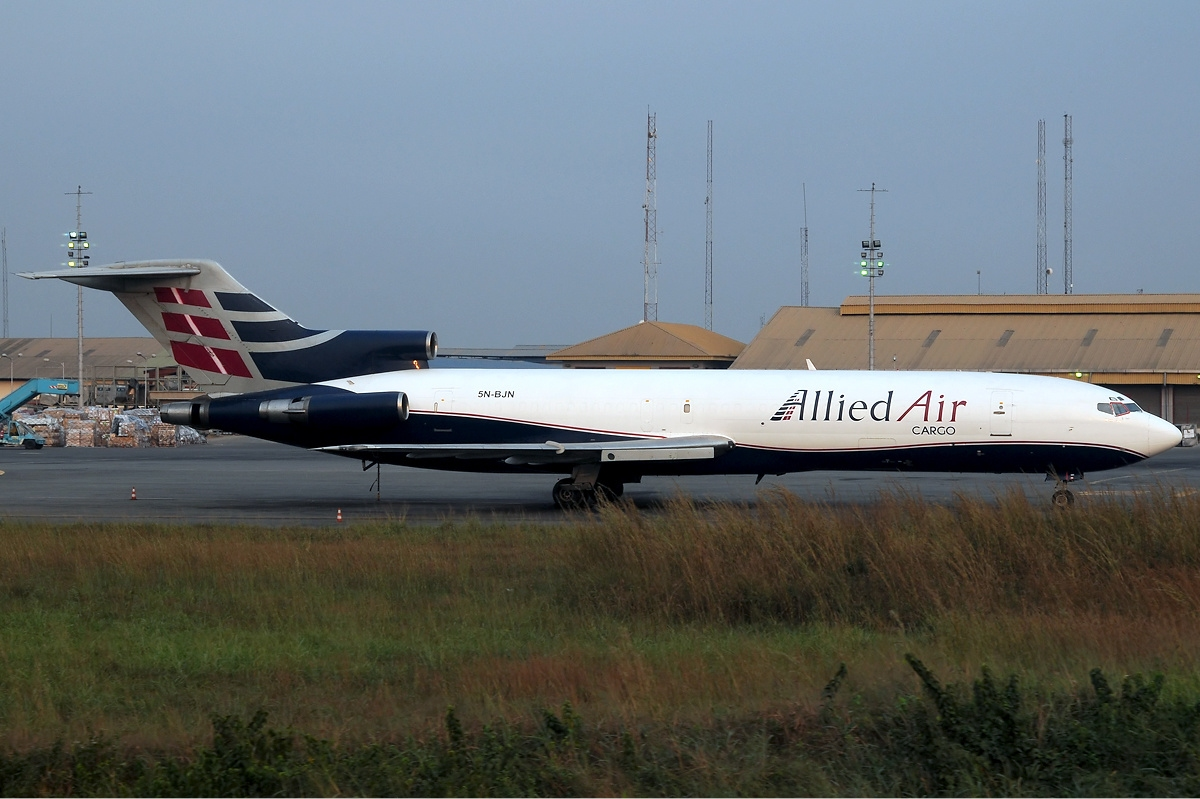
- 5N-BJN, the involved aircraft in 2011

Accident
- Date: 2 June 2012
- Summary: Runway overrun on landing due to pilot error
- Site: Accra International Airport, Accra, Ghana; 5.6047°N 0.1674°W
- Total fatalities: 12

Aircraft
- Aircraft type: Boeing 727-221F Advanced
- Operator: Allied Air
- ICAO flight No.: DHV111
- Registration: 5N-BJN
- Flight origin: Murtala Muhammed International Airport, Lagos, Nigeria
- Destination: Accra International Airport, Accra, Ghana
- Occupants: 4
- Crew: 4
- Fatalities: 0
- Injuries: 4
- Survivors: 4

Ground casualties
- Ground fatalities: 12

Allied Air Flight 111 was a cargo flight operated by Lagos-based cargo airliner Allied Air, flying from Lagos, Nigeria to Accra, Ghana. The flight was operated with a Boeing 727 cargo aircraft. On 2 June 2012, the aircraft crashed on landing at Accra International Airport, killing twelve people on the ground.

The aircraft overran the runway, broke through the airport perimeter fence, and struck a minibus and bicycle on a roadway. All four crew members on the plane survived, but all 10 aboard the minibus, a cyclist and a passenger of a taxi were killed. It was the second deadliest accident in Ghanaian aviation history.

== Aircraft ==
Just over 20 years prior, the same aircraft had performed the final flight for Pan American World Airways from Bridgetown, Barbados to Miami, Florida, USA as N368PA, being built in 1982 as a 727-221Adv.

== Flight ==
Allied Air Flight 111 was a flight from Lagos Murtala Muhammed Airport to Accra International Airport with 4 crew members aboard. It took off from Lagos at 19:04 local time and was cleared to flight level 240. The flight operated under instrument flight rules (IFR). Weather was reported to be inclement, with turbulence reportedly present.

As it was approaching Accra, the flight crew was told to descend to 2,000 feet (610 m), and then ordered to climb to 3,000 feet (910 m) due to high ground. On approach to Accra, the captain decided to fly an instrument landing system (ILS) approach. However, he later disconnected the autopilot and decided to fly manually.

During landing, the aircraft encountered instrument meteorological conditions (IMS), with rain and zero visibility. The landing became unstable, and the aircraft touched down at a speed of 167 knots (309 km/h; 192 mph). Thrust reversers and normal braking were deployed, but proved ineffective. The nose gear remained in the air, and did not touch ground until the aircraft flew into the perimeter fence.

The aircraft overran the runway and impacted the field's threshold lights and approach lights. It then destroyed the ILS localizer, the debris from which struck a passing taxi cab, causing an injury to its occupant. The aircraft then entered crowded Giffard Road, and crushed a minibus with 10 people on board. All aboard were killed. The plane then uprooted a tree, and stopped in an open area near El-Wak Stadium.

All 4 crew members survived the accident with minor injuries.

== Investigation ==
Investigation by the Ghanaian government's accident investigation commission concluded that the cause of the crash was pilot error. The pilot landed long- 4000' from the threshold of Runway 03. The remaining runway distance was insufficient to allow the plane to come to a stop. The investigation stated that both pilots might have been fixated on landing immediately, regardless of the poor conditions. The flight crew also did not deploy the speed brake, contributing to the aircraft overrunning the runway.
