= Ukrainian-Mediterranean Airlines Flight 4230 =

2003 aviation accident

Coordinates: 40.8068806°N 39.6560722°E

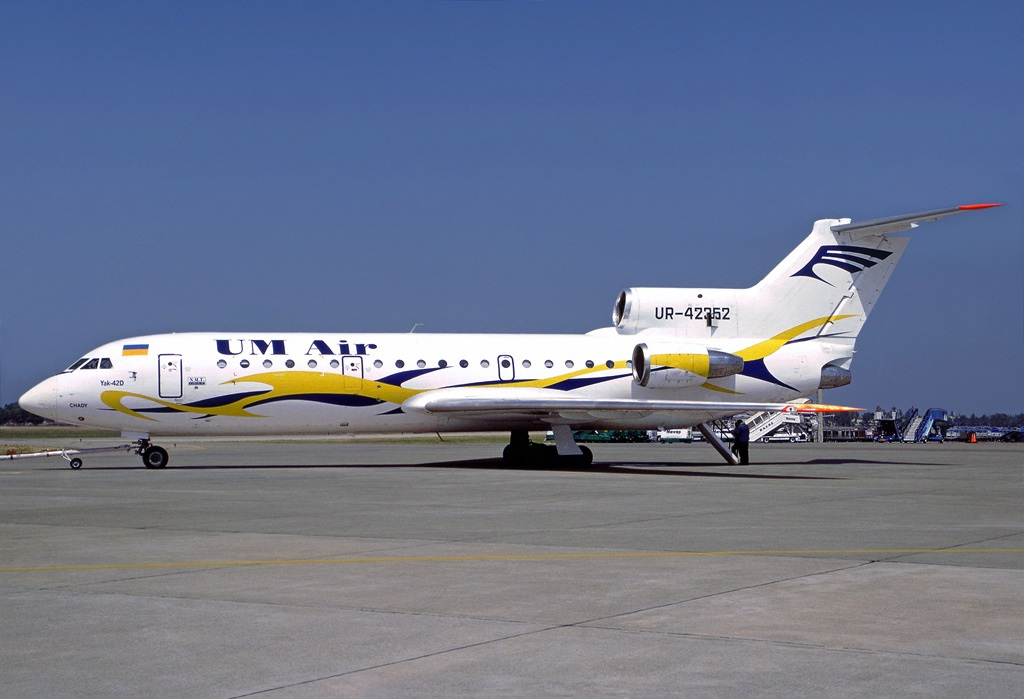
- The aircraft involved in the crash, seen here at Antalya Airport in 2001

Accident
- Date: 26 May 2003
- Summary: Controlled flight into terrain due to poor visibility
- Site: Maçka, Trabzon, Turkey

Aircraft
- Aircraft type: Yakovlev Yak-42D
- Operator: Ukrainian-Mediterranean Airlines
- IATA flight No.: UF4230
- ICAO flight No.: UKM4230
- Call sign: UKRAINE MEDITERRANEE 4230
- Registration: UR-42352
- Flight origin: Manas International Airport Bishkek, Kyrgyzstan
- Stopover: Trabzon Airport, Trabzon, Turkey
- Destination: Zaragoza Airport, Zaragoza, Spain
- Occupants: 75
- Passengers: 62
- Crew: 13
- Fatalities: 75
- Survivors: 0

Ukrainian-Mediterranean Airlines Flight 4230 was a chartered international passenger flight, a Yakovlev Yak-42D operated by Ukrainian UM Airlines, which crashed in 2003.

Flying from Manas International Airport, Bishkek, Kyrgyzstan to Zaragoza Airport, Spain, the Yak-42D tried to land at Trabzon Airport in Turkey to refuel on May 26, 2003, but, because of dense fog, it slammed into a mountain near Maçka, Trabzon. All 13 crew and 62 passengers were killed. It remains the third-worst crash in Turkish aviation history.

== Accident ==
The Ukrainian-Mediterranean Airlines Yakovlev Yak-42 was a chartered aircraft being used to transport Spanish troops after a four-month peacekeeping tour of Afghanistan. The final destination was Zaragoza Airport, but the aircraft attempted to stopover at Trabzon Airport in Turkey in order to refuel. The aircraft crashed into the side of a mountain near the town of Maçka, 15 miles (24 km) from Trabzon, on its third attempt to land in dense fog. The pilot had stated that he could not see the runway; visibility was less than 10 metres (33 ft).

All crew and passengers were killed in the impact. The troops on board comprised 41 members of the army and 21 members of the air force. The aircraft was also carrying ammunition; explosions after the crash distributed the wreckage over a large area.

== Passengers and crew ==
Country	Passengers	Crew	Total
Spain	62	0	62
Ukraine	0	12	12
Belarus	0	1	1
Total	62	13	75

== Context ==
The aircraft had been chartered from the Ukrainian Ukrainian-Mediterranean Airlines by the Spanish defence ministry to return some of the 120 Spanish troops working as International Security Assistance Force peacekeepers in Afghanistan.

== Aftermath ==
Spanish defence minister Federico Trillo stated, "the meteorological conditions and dense fog caused the drama." NATO Secretary-General George Robertson stated, "This is an appalling tragedy, given that these soldiers were serving the interest of peace in a difficult mission in Afghanistan." In 2004, the Spanish government sacked three generals after it was discovered that 22 of the victims' bodies had been misidentified and returned to the wrong families.
