= 1972 Lake Winnebago mid-air collision =

Fatal aviation accident

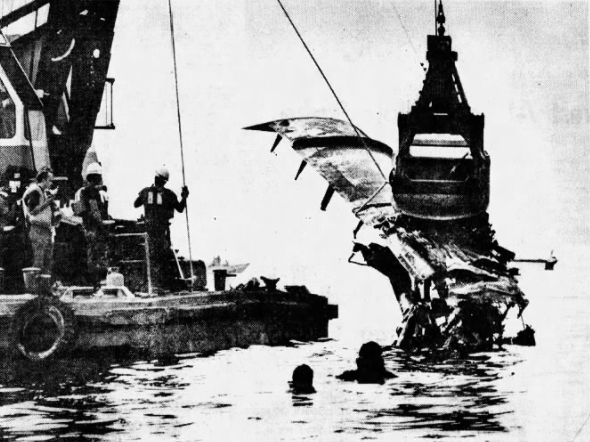
- The left wing of Air Wisconsin Flight 671 being recovered from Lake Winnebago

Accident
- Date: June 29, 1972
- Summary: Mid-air collision
- Site: Over Lake Winnebago, near Fox Crossing, Wisconsin, United States; 44°11′00″N 88°23′10″W
- Total fatalities: 13
- Total survivors: 0

First aircraft
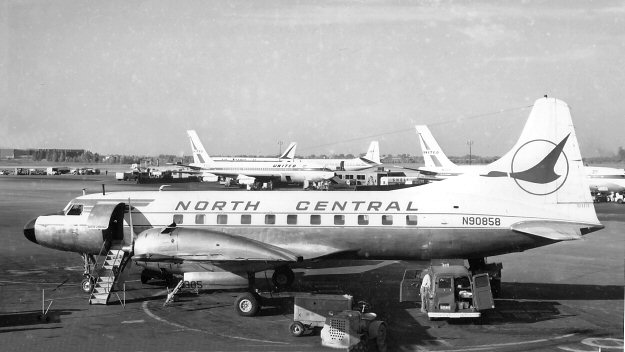
- N90858, the Convair CV-580 involved in the accident, seen in 1961
- Type: Convair CV-580
- Operator: North Central Airlines
- Registration: N90858
- Flight origin: Green Bay–Austin Straubel International Airport, United States
- Stopover: Winnebago County Airport, United States
- Destination: Milwaukee Mitchell International Airport, United States
- Passengers: 2
- Crew: 3
- Fatalities: 5
- Survivors: 0

Second aircraft
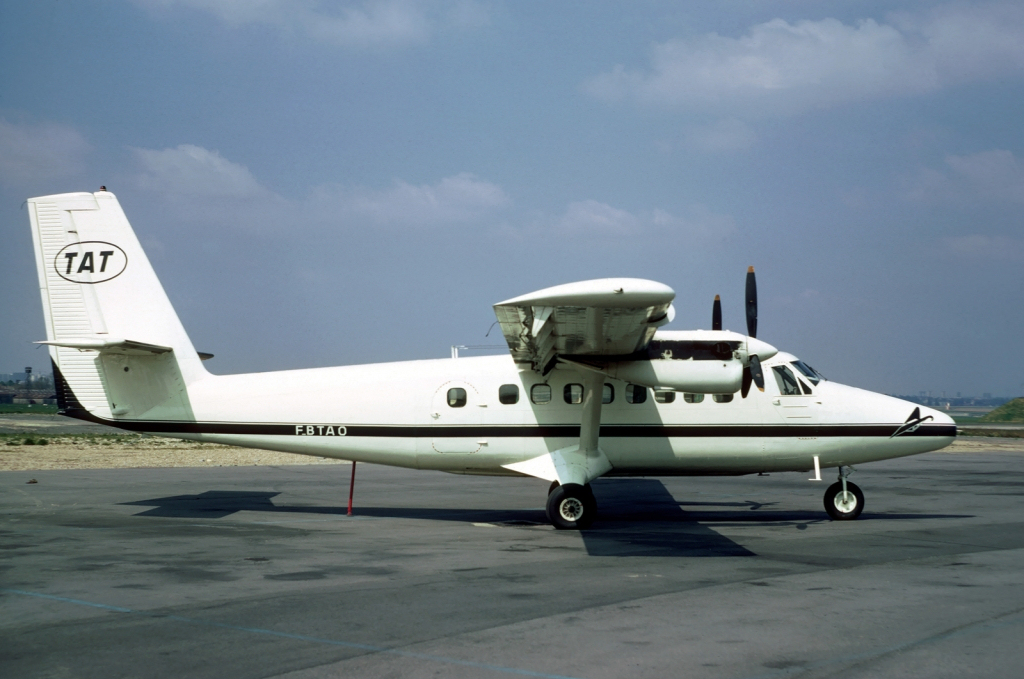
- A de Havilland Canada DHC-6 Twin Otter similar to the aircraft involved in the collision
- Type: de Havilland Canada DHC-6 Twin Otter
- Operator: Air Wisconsin
- Registration: N4043B
- Flight origin: O'Hare International Airport, United States
- Stopover: Sheboygan County Memorial Airport, United States
- Destination: Outagamie County Regional Airport, United States
- Passengers: 6
- Crew: 2
- Fatalities: 8
- Survivors: 0

On June 29, 1972, North Central Airlines Flight 290 collided in mid-air with Air Wisconsin Flight 671 over Lake Winnebago near Fox Crossing, Wisconsin, in the United States. Both aircraft crashed into the lake, killing all 13 people on board both aircraft.

== Flight history ==
=== North Central Airlines Flight 290 ===
North Central Airlines Flight 290 was a regularly scheduled flight which usually originated in Houghton, Michigan, and stopped at Ironwood, Michigan, and Green Bay, Oshkosh, and Milwaukee, Wisconsin, before terminating at Chicago, Illinois. On June 29, 1972, bad weather in northern Michigan necessitated cancellation of the Houghton-Ironwood and Ironwood-Green Bay legs, and the flight originated at Green Bay, using a replacement crew sent from Chicago to Green Bay.

The aircraft operating the flight, a Convair CV-580 registered N90858, departed Green Bay at around 10:30 a.m. CDT, proceeding to Oshkosh under visual flight rules (VFR). At 10:36:11 a.m. CDT, the air traffic controller at Oshkosh cleared Flight 290 to land. The flight crew's acknowledgment five seconds later was the last communication with North Central Flight 290.

=== Air Wisconsin Flight 671 ===
Air Wisconsin Flight 671 was a regularly scheduled flight from Chicago, Illinois, to Appleton, Wisconsin, with a stopover at Sheboygan County Memorial Airport west of Sheboygan, Wisconsin. Operated by a de Havilland Canada DHC-6 Twin Otter registered N4043B, it departed Chicago at 9:28 a.m. CDT on June 29, 1972, bound for Sheboygan under an instrument flight rules (IFR) plan; en route, the flight crew abandoned its IFR plan and completed the first leg of the flight under VFR.

Flight 671 departed Sheboygan 13 minutes late, at 10:23 a.m. CDT, bound for Appleton, operating under VFR. At about 10:30 a.m. CDT, the flight crew contacted the Air Wisconsin office in Appleton, stating that they anticipated arriving at Appleton at 10:44 a.m. CDT. This was the last communication with Air Wisconsin Flight 671.

== Collision ==
Location of the collision

Operating in bright sunshine beneath a scattered cloud layer, Flight 290 and Flight 671 collided at 10:36:47 a.m. CDT over Wisconsin's Lake Winnebago about six nautical miles (6.9 mi; 11 km) south of Appleton and 2.5 nautical miles (2.9 mi; 4.6 km) east of Neenah, Wisconsin, at an altitude of about 2,500 feet (762 m). The left wing of Flight 671 hit the left wing of Flight 290. The collision resulted in an explosion which tore off most of the Twin Otter's wing, and around a quarter of the CV-580's left wing. The collision left both aircraft uncontrollable, resulting in both crashing into Lake Winnebago around two nautical miles (3.7 km; 2.3 mi) east of Neenah Light.

The National Transportation Safety Board noted that the North Central crew would have had to look toward the sun to see the approaching Air Wisconsin plane and concluded that they took no evasive action. Some eyewitnesses believed that the Air Wisconsin Twin Otter began a turn seconds before the collision, but the NTSB did not find sufficient evidence to conclude that the Air Wisconsin crew took evasive action. The rate of closure during the final five seconds before the collision was 688 ft/s (469 mph; 755 km/h).

== Aircraft ==
The North Central aircraft involved, N90858, had been completed as a Convair CV-340/440 on May 25, 1953; it had later been converted to CV-580 standard. The Air Wisconsin Twin Otter had been completed on October 6, 1966. Both aircraft were destroyed by the collision and subsequent water impact. Their wreckage was found on the lake bottom scattered over an area roughly one mile (1.6 km) long by one-half mile (0.8 km) wide.

== Casualties ==
The North Central aircraft N90858 had two passengers and a crew of three (Captain James Cuzzort, First Officer Alton Laabs, and Flight Attendant Frances Rabb) on board. The Air Wisconsin aircraft N4043B was carrying six passengers and a crew of two (Captain David Jacobs and First Officer Michael Gaffin). All 13 people aboard the two aircraft died in the collision and subsequent crash, and the NTSB observed that the accident was not survivable.

== Investigation ==
The National Transportation Safety Board released its report on the accident on April 25, 1973. It was "unable to determine why each crew failed to see and avoid the other aircraft," and concluded that the crash resulted from "the failure of both flight crews to detect visually the other aircraft in sufficient time to initiate evasive action," and stated that it believed "that the ability of both crews to detect the other aircraft in time to avoid a collision was reduced because of the atmospheric conditions and human visual limitations." The NTSB speculated that both flight crews could have been scanning instruments in preparation for descent to their respective destinations at the time of the collision, and this could have reduced their chances of spotting one another. The report also noted that the decision by both flight crews to fly under VFR rather than IFR and the fact that neither captain requested in-flight advisories deprived both aircraft of air traffic control support, and that such support to even one of the aircraft would have ensured sufficient separation to avoid a collision.

The NTSB recommended that the Federal Aviation Administration create a standardized method for training and grading flight crews in visual search techniques and time-sharing between instrument checks and visual searches, and that the FAA expedite the development of anticollision systems.
