= Ukrainian-Mediterranean Airlines =

Ukrainian airline

| IATA | ICAO | Call sign |
|---|---|---|
| UF | UKM | UKRAINE MEDITERRANEE |
- Founded: 1998
- Ceased operations: 2018
- Hubs: Kyiv International Airport (Zhuliany)
- Frequent-flyer program: Ticket-Bonus
- Fleet size: 1
- Destinations: 4
- Headquarters: Kyiv, Ukraine
- Key people: Rodrigue Merhej (Chairman)
- Website: umair.com.ua

Ukrainian-Mediterranean Airlines (Ukrainian: Українсько-середземноморські авіалінії, Ukrayinsʹko-seredzemnomorsʹki avialiniyi), also known as UM Air, was an airline based in Kyiv, Ukraine. It ceased operations in 2018.

== History ==
The airline was established by Lebanese businessmen in 1998 and began operations in June 2000. It was founded as an open-end joint-stock company. In 2003 UM Air had over 500 employees and carried 210,000 passengers.

In 2007, the Ukrainian Air Administration refused to renew UM Air's license because of safety concerns. In September 2007 the European Commission banned Ukrainian-Mediterranean Airlines from operating in the airspace over the European Union, citing safety issues. This meant that it was banned for safety reasons from operating services of any kind within the European Union. In November 2009, the airline was allowed to resume operations with its McDonnell Douglas MD-83 aircraft by the European Commission.

In 2013, UM Air was one of two Ukrainian airlines that had sanctions imposed against them by the US government. UM Air was accused of supplying British Aerospace BAe 146 series aircraft to Iranian airline Mahan Air and of training Mahan Air pilots and maintenance technicians. Mahan Air was itself already under sanction by the US government. UM's owner and Chairman Rodrigue Merhej was also personally placed under sanction.

== Destinations ==
UM Air served the following scheduled destinations as of December 2017:

Iran

- Tehran - Tehran Imam Khomeini International Airport

Jordan

- Amman - Queen Alia International Airport

Lebanon

- Beirut - Beirut-Rafic Hariri International Airport

Ukraine

- Kyiv - Kyiv International Airport (Zhuliany) base

== Fleet ==
=== Current fleet ===
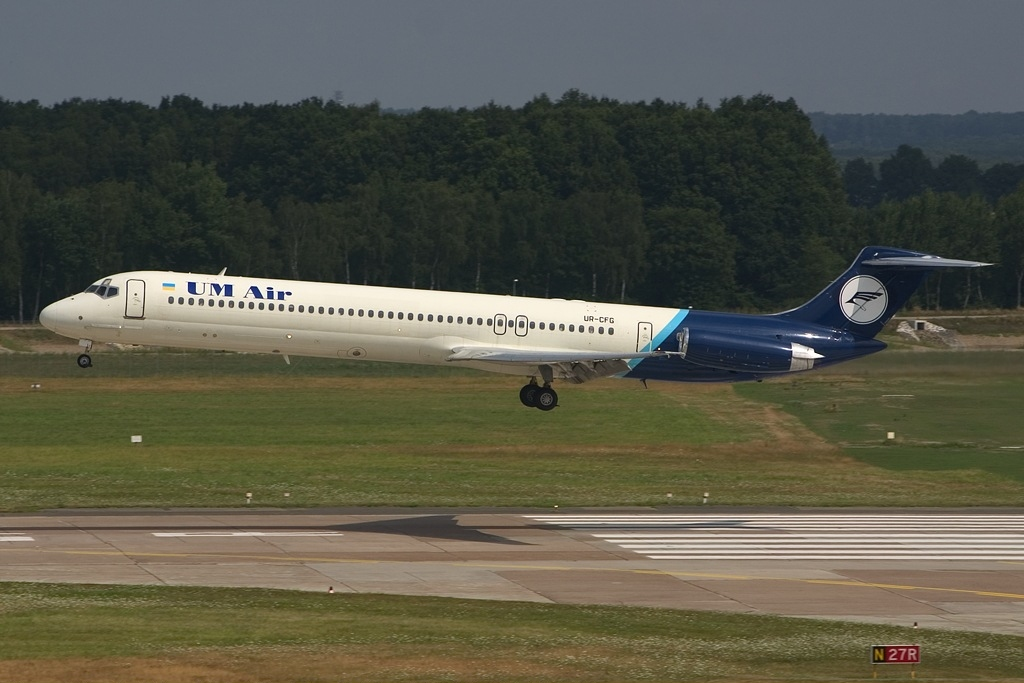
UM Air McDonnell Douglas MD-83

The UM Air fleet consisted of the following aircraft (as of September 2016):

UM Air fleet
| Aircraft | In Fleet | Orders | Passengers | Notes |
|---|---|---|---|---|
| McDonnell Douglas MD-83 | 1 | — | 172 | Stored |
| Total | 1 | — | | |

=== Previously operated ===
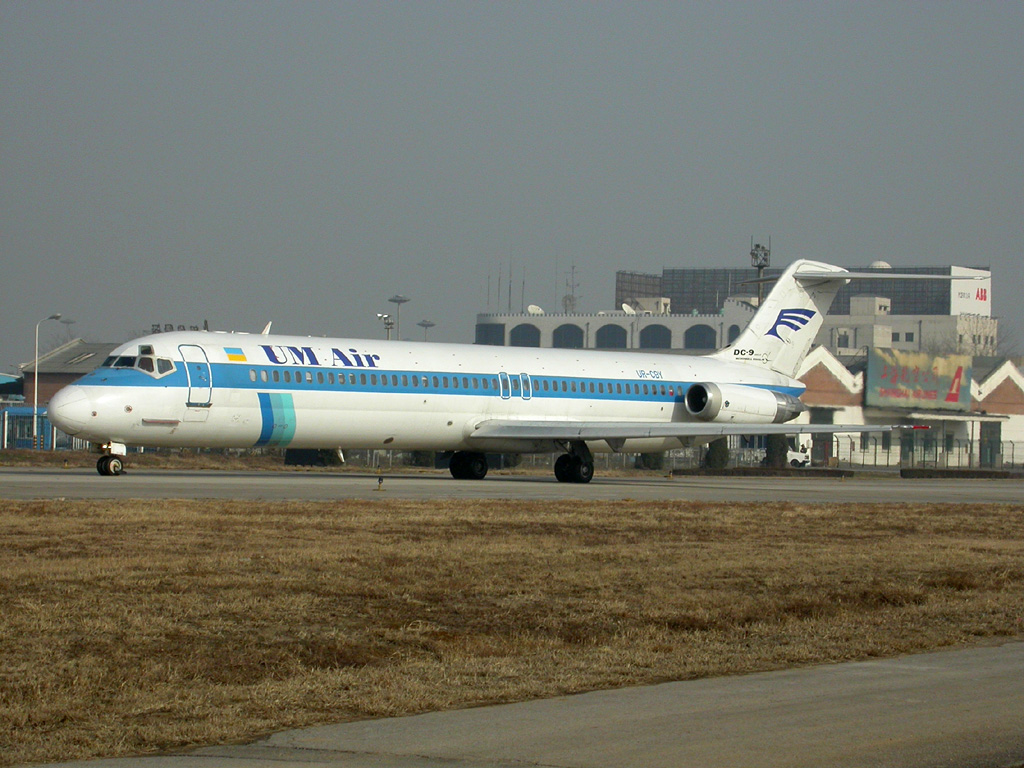
Former UM Air McDonnell Douglas DC-9 wearing hybrid colors of its previous owner Finnair

- Antonov An-24RV
- Tupolev Tu-134A
- Tupolev Tu-154B2
- Yakovlev Yak-42D

== Accidents and incidents ==
- On 26 May 2003, a UM Yakovlev Yak-42D operating as Ukrainian-Mediterranean Airlines Flight 4230 crashed near Maçka, Trabzon (Turkey) while carrying 62 Spanish troops from Afghanistan to Zaragoza Air Base. All 75 on board died.
