= TWA Flight 742 =

1973 aviation accident over the Pacific Ocean

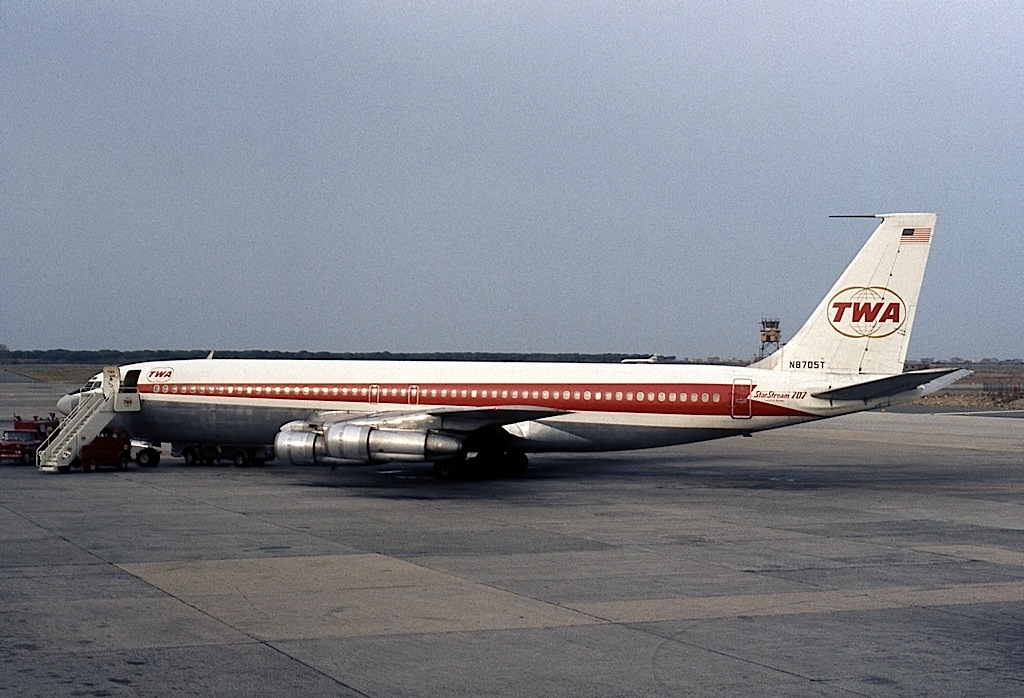
- N8705T, the aircraft involved in the accident, seen in 1971

Accident
- Date: August 28, 1973
- Summary: Pilot-induced oscillation in response to aircraft upset caused by manufacturing flaw
- Site: Pacific Ocean near Los Angeles

Aircraft
- Aircraft type: Boeing 707-331B
- Operator: Trans World Airlines
- IATA flight No.: TW742
- ICAO flight No.: TWA742
- Call sign: TWA 742
- Registration: N8705T
- Flight origin: Don Mueang International Airport, Bangkok, Thailand
- 1st stopover: Kai Tak International Airport, Hong Kong
- 2nd stopover: Taipei Songshan Airport, Taipei, Taiwan
- 3rd stopover: Naha Airport, Okinawa, Japan
- 4th stopover: Antonio B. Won Pat International Airport, Guam
- 5th stopover: Honolulu International Airport, Hawaii, United States
- Last stopover: Los Angeles International Airport, California, United States
- Destination: San Francisco International Airport, California, United States
- Passengers: 141
- Crew: 11
- Fatalities: 1
- Injuries: 4
- Survivors: 151

TWA Flight 742 was a multi-leg Trans World Airlines flight from Bangkok to San Francisco. On August 28, 1973, near the end of its penultimate leg from Honolulu to Los Angeles, during the descent over the Pacific Ocean, the Boeing 707 entered severe porpoising oscillations, resulting in injuries to two crew members and three passengers; one critically injured passenger died two days later.

== Aircraft and crew ==
The captain of Flight 742 was John Wilber Harpster, 53, with 26,171 hours of flying time. The first officer Robert Cooper Evans, 39, had 6,128 hours of flight time, while flight engineer Don Wilbur Jackson, 53, had 19,000 hours.

The aircraft was a Boeing 707-331B, manufactured in December 1965 and delivered new to the airline in 1966. Until the time of the accident, the airframe had accumulated 31,136 hours of flight time.

== Accident ==
N8705T took off from Honolulu at 17:09 (all times PDT); after an uneventful cruise at FL330 (about 33,000 feet (10,000 m)) it established control with LAX Control Center at 21:12. At 21:29, the crew were cleared to descend to FL 110 (about 11,000 feet (3,400 m)). The pilots disconnected the autopilot, reduced power and entered a descent.

As the 707 descended through 22,000 feet (6,700 m) at 350 knots (400 mph; 650 km/h) indicated airspeed (KIAS), the nose abruptly pitched up. The crew tried to level the aircraft, but the nose then rapidly pitched down. As the pilots tried to regain control, they reduced the engine power to idle, disengaged rudder power, Mach trim and yaw damper; the flight engineer also pulled the respective circuit breakers. Despite the crew's efforts, the 707 entered a violent porpoising motion, alternating abrupt pitch-up and pitch-down movement. After about two minutes, the oscillations gradually abated and the crew regained level flight at 19,500 feet (5,900 m). On checking the controls, the pilots found the 707 controllable, but noticed increased resistance of the control column to forward movement.

While continuing descent to 11,000 feet (3,400 m), the crew notified the air traffic control of an emergency and contacted the TWA maintenance center. Flight 742 continued without further incident and landed at Los Angeles at 22:43.

Two flight attendants strapped in their seats and three passengers, standing or moving in the aisles, were injured, requiring hospitalization. A number of passengers sustained minor injuries caused by items falling out of the overhead bins. One critically injured passenger died of intracranial bleeding in hospital on August 30.

== Unique aircraft, unique problem ==
The NTSB, investigating the accident, found out that N8705T experienced 50 oscillations in about 2 minutes, with peak acceleration forces of 2.4 g.

There were four possible causes for such violent pitching oscillations, three of them being quickly ruled out:

- there was no severe turbulence according to both the pilots and the meteorological reports from August 28;
- according to the flight data recorder, there was no erratic pilot action on the flight controls before the onset of the pitch-up;
- there were no known longitudinal stability problems inherent to the basic design of the Boeing 707, since other 707s in service did not experience problems similar to N8705T.

The only option left was a malfunction or out-of-tolerance condition within this particular 707's longitudinal control systems. On checking the N8705T's history, the investigators found that the aircraft experienced similar oscillating motion on July 18, 1972 while on departure from Windsor Locks, Connecticut; since the post-flight inspection did not reveal anything amiss with the aircraft, the upset was assumed to be an effect of turbulence. This confirmed to the investigators there was an issue with the N8705T's flight control system.

A series of flight tests was conducted both at Kansas City (where the TWA maintenance base was located) and in Seattle (the manufacturer's site); another 707 with no flight control issues was used in tests for comparison. The test pilots quickly noticed that there was indeed a problem with the flight controls: N8705T required significantly different forces on the control column to operate the elevators than the 707 used for comparison. On close examination of the gathered data, the investigators noticed that the left elevator deflected significantly further than the right with the same control column deflection.

A ground test was performed to check the behavior of the airflow over the N8705T's elevators. It was noted that the upper skin of both elevators experienced waviness (due to compression), an effect that was known to occur; however, in this case, the wave amplitude was excessive: 0.42 inches for the left elevator and 0.32 for the right (on the aircraft used for comparison it was 0.12 and 0.28 inches, respectively). When the entire stabilizer–elevator assembly on N8705T was replaced with one taken from another 707 with no flight control and stability issues, the aircraft did not exhibit any stability difficulties and the elevator movement was correct.

On closely examining the profile of the stabilizer–elevator assembly of the accident aircraft, a fault was noticed on the left side: the stabilizer and elevator should be aligned together (upper nose contour of an elevator with the contour extension of an upper stabilizer surface) within a certain limit of tolerance. On N8705T the left elevator, while within tolerance, was aligned below the contour extension line of the stabilizer, while the right elevator was aligned correctly.

Combining the increased waviness of the left elevator with its slight misalignment, the boundary layer of air over the elevator in flight was thicker than in other 707s, which caused its hinge moment to be much lower; in simpler terms, on N8705T the layer of air flowing over the left stabilizer was thicker than on other aircraft because two effects combined together: the increased waviness of the metal skin and the slight misalignment of the stabilizer–elevator assembly. Therefore, the amount of force needed to push or pull the left elevator to its full deflection limit was much lower than on the other 707 and much lower than the crew was accustomed to; it could be fully deflected with much less movement of the control column.

== Accident sequence ==
In flight, the balance of the 707 is constantly changing as fuel burns and weight decreases; an automatic system is designed to keep the plane in trim. However, on N8705T, this system was causing the left elevator to deflect more than on other 707s because of the unique combination of misalignment and increased waviness. With no one realizing it, when the accident 707 was expected to be properly trimmed, it was in fact flying slightly out of trim. On August 28, 1973, as the plane was descending towards Los Angeles, this out of trim situation caused an abrupt pitch-up of the aircraft. The crew tried to push the nose down, unknowingly making the situation worse: They used the amount of force and forward deflection of the control column that they were accustomed to on other 707s and which assumed to be enough to bring the plane back to level flight. On this particular aircraft, however, this amount of force was too great and deflected the elevator much more than the crew intended; instead of leveling the plane, the crew pushed it into a violent downward pitch. Trying to rectify that, they pulled the yokes back, but once again, they unknowingly used too much force, over-corrected, and caused yet another violent pitch-up instead of leveling off. This sequence is a classic case of a phenomenon known as pilot-induced oscillation.

== Aftermath ==
The investigators noted that the majority of the injuries sustained on Flight 742 were caused by presence of sharp and misplaced objects in the cabin; they called for inspection and redesign of the interiors and galleys on a commercial aircraft (padding hard surfaces, elimination of sharp edges and corners, improved locks in overhead luggage racks) to avoid accidental injuries when encountering turbulences. A US Navy surgeon was present on board and helped in first aid to the injured; he later stated that the contents of onboard first aid kit were insufficient in an emergency, and called for improvement and expansion of the kits.

N8705T was withdrawn from service on July 12, 1983. It was later scrapped at Davis–Monthan Air Force Base.

== See also ==
- Phugoid
- China Eastern Airlines Flight 583
- United Airlines Flight 826
- TWA Flight 841 (1979)
