= Zalingei =

Zalingei زالنجي
- Town
- Location in Sudan
- Coordinates: 12°53′59″N 23°28′36″E
- Country: Sudan
- State: Central Darfur
- Control: Rapid Support Forces
- Elevation: 2,952 ft (900 m)

Population (2009)
  - Total: 27,258
- Time zone: UTC+02:00 (CAT)

Zalingei or Zalinjay (Arabic: زالنجي) is a town in Western Sudan, and it is the capital of Central Darfur. In 2018, the population was approximately 28,700. Zalingei is also the name of the district in which the city lies. In 2023, the district's population was approximately 169,800.

== History ==
The market of Zalingei in 1961

Zalingei developed over centuries in an area long inhabited by the Fur and once belonging to the Sultanate of Darfur. Its precise founding date is unknown. Zalingei’s location made it an administrative centre for the region’s western territories, both under the Darfur sultans and during Anglo-Egyptian rule.

The town has experienced security instability since 2003. This is because of the rebels and armed opponents who use it as a ground to launch their attacks against the state.

In February 2003, the War in Darfur started. Zalingei was also affected. Despite a ceasefire agreed between the Sudanese government and the SLA in September 2003, Janjaweed attacks continued in the Zalingei area during September and October. By early November, escalating militia activity in West Darfur had rendered the agreement ineffective. Violence associated with the government counter-offensive intensified and spread along the El Geneina–Nyala road, including in the Zalingei area, continuing into March 2004. A retrospective mortality survey covering October 2003 to April 2004 estimated a crude mortality rate of 2.20 deaths per 10,000 people per day in Zalingei, (Note: A crude mortality rate of 2.20 deaths per 10,000 people per day corresponds to an annualised rate of about 80 deaths per 1,000 people, nearly ten times the global crude death rate at the time.) with 49% of deaths attributed to violence.

In late 2003, an MSF assessment found around 15,000 displaced people in Zalingei, with more arriving daily from surrounding villages after pro-government militias had destroyed their homes. World Food Programme aid deliveries were inconsistent and did not reach all intended recipients. In April and May 2004, the general acute malnutrition rate in Zalingei was recorded at 23.4%. By July, conditions in Zalingei had improved, aided by feeding programmes and food distributions.

By December 2004, the war had transformed Zalingei, with large IDP camps expanding around the city. Estimates of the number of IDP's were uncertain because displaced people were scattered across at least ten sites in the town and many were staying with local residents. A figure of 90,000 was reported for October that year, but this included local residents as well as displaced people. Residents of Hassa Hissa camp close to Zalingei said that insecurity prevented them from moving freely or returning to their villages, while women faced the risk of sexual violence when leaving the camp to collect firewood.

In late 2005, clashes broke out near Zalingei between two Arab groups, Hotiya-Baggara cattle herders and Newiba-Aballa camel herders. The fighting reportedly killed around 60 people and displaced about 250 families to settlements in the town. It may have begun over access to local resources and cattle, and followed earlier clashes in October that reportedly killed between 150 and 200 people. Beginning in late summer 2006, renewed fighting broke out near Zalingei between the two groups. (Note: Fadul and Tanner transcribe the name of the second group as Nawaiba.) Fadul and Tanner linked such local conflicts to rising ethnic tensions and the spread of tribal militias, weapons, lawlessness and impunity during the wider war.

In 2012, Central Darfur State was established from a part of West Darfur, with Zalingei as its capital.

By 2019, there were six IDP camps, and one refugee settlement in the vicinity of Zalingei.

In 2023, the town became under siege during the 2023 Sudan conflict and fell to the Rapid Support Forces in August 2023. During this war, trade in Zalingei was disrupted by insecurity and interruptions to major transport routes. Cash shortages led to the emergence of a local money market (souq el gurush).

== Administration ==
Central Darfur was created from West Darfur in 2012, with Zalingei as one of its eight localities. The locality comprises the administrative units of Abata, Zalingei and Rural Traije. Traditional administration operates from the locality down to the village level through a hierarchy.

== Geography and climate ==
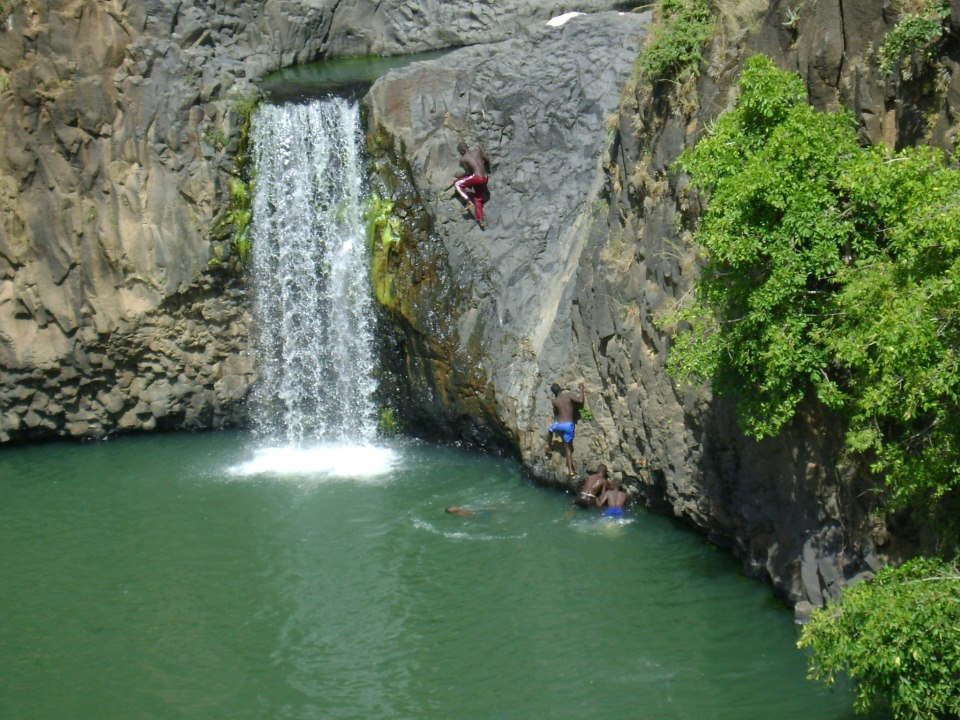
Zalingei waterfall

Zalingei lies in the fertile valley of the seasonal Wadi Azum river, near the Jebel Marra mountains, which provided access to water in the surrounding savannah. A wadi is a river valley or a riverbed that typically contains water only when heavy rain occurs.

Köppen-Geiger climate classification system classifies Zalingei’s climate as hot semi-arid (BSh). Afternoon temperatures are always hot and are hottest in March, April and May when they may reach 40 °C (104 °F). The rainy season is from June to September. At this time the diurnal temperature range is least, and afternoon temperatures are cooler but still hot, being coolest in the wettest month of August. On the other hand, morning temperatures are coolest from November to February, when diurnal temperature variation is greatest, so that morning temperatures drop to as low as 6 °C (43 °F).

Climate data for Zalingei
Month	Jan	Feb	Mar	Apr	May	Jun	Jul	Aug	Sep	Oct	Nov	Dec	Year
Mean daily maximum °C (°F)	33.8 (92.8)	34.8 (94.6)	37 (99)	37.7 (99.9)	37.4 (99.3)	34.6 (94.3)	30.4 (86.7)	28.7 (83.7)	30.8 (87.4)	34 (93)	34.2 (93.6)	33.6 (92.5)	33.9 (93.1)
Daily mean °C (°F)	20.1 (68.2)	21.4 (70.5)	25 (77)	26.4 (79.5)	27.9 (82.2)	27 (81)	24.7 (76.5)	23.6 (74.5)	24.1 (75.4)	24.1 (75.4)	21.9 (71.4)	20.3 (68.5)	23.9 (75.0)
Mean daily minimum °C (°F)	6.5 (43.7)	8.1 (46.6)	13 (55)	15.2 (59.4)	18.4 (65.1)	19.5 (67.1)	19 (66)	18.6 (65.5)	17.5 (63.5)	14.2 (57.6)	9.6 (49.3)	7 (45)	13.9 (57.0)
Average rainfall mm (inches)	0 (0)	0 (0)	1 (0.0)	5 (0.2)	26 (1.0)	70 (2.8)	177 (7.0)	198 (7.8)	97 (3.8)	16 (0.6)	0 (0)	0 (0)	590 (23.2)
Source: Climate-Data.org, altitude: 890 metres or 2,920 feet

== Demographics ==
In 2004, the Fur were the predominant ethnic group in Zalingei. In the IDP camps in 2007, about 95% was Fur.

In 2023, the median age in the district was 18.3 years, somewhat higher for females than for males.

== Education and healthcare ==
The University of Zalingei is a public university in Zalingei. It was established in 1994 as part of the expansion of public universities across Sudan.

Zalingei Teaching Hospital is the region’s main referral hospital. By 2025, the hospital provided care for around 500,000 people and was the only medical facility in Central Darfur equipped to treat both emergency cases and severe cholera infections.

In 2003, Médecins Sans Frontières started a mission in Zalingei.

== Transport ==
Zalingei Airport, also known as Zalengei or Zalinjay Airport, is a regional airport approximately five kilometres northeast of Zalingei. (IATA: ZLX, ICAO: HSZA).

In 2001, the only paved road from Zalingei led to Nyala.
