= List of accidents and incidents involving the Antonov An-24 =

The Antonov An-24 has suffered 159 accidents with a total of 2,134 fatalities.

== 1960s ==
29 July 1962
An An-24 (CCCP-46708) still owned by Antonov crashed at Ternopil Airport during a test flight while simulating a right-engine failure; all eight crew on board survived, but the aircraft was written off.

20 March 1965
An Aeroflot An-24 (CCCP-46764) landed short of the runway at Khanty-Mansiysk Airport, struck a snow drift and broke up, killing 43 of 47 on board. The cause of the crash was not determined, but pilot error was blamed.

2 February 1966
A United Arab Airlines An-24 (SU-AOB) crashed at Luxor, Egypt during a test flight.

18 March 1966
United Arab Airlines Flight 749 crashed while attempting to land at Cairo International Airport. All 30 passengers and crew on board were killed.

29 August 1966
A Cubana An-24 (CU-T875) was written off at Camaguey Airport.

30 September 1966
United Arab Airlines Flight 322 (an An-24B, SU-AOM) struck a camel while taking off from Luxor International Airport, damaging the right side landing gear. The aircraft was able to make a wheels-up landing at Cairo with no casualties to the 43 on board.

7 February 1967
A United Arab Airlines An-24 was hijacked by one person and flown to Amman, Jordan.

30 December 1967
Aeroflot Flight L-51, an An-24B (CCCP-46215), crashed near Liepāja Airport after the crew put the left engine into reverse thrust in an attempt to slow the aircraft down for landing, killing 44 of 51 on board. The crash remains the deadliest aviation accident in Latvian history.

31 December 1967
An Aeroflot An-24B (CCCP-46201) crashed short of the runway at Voronezh Airport.

6 January 1968
Aeroflot Flight 1668, an An-24B (CCCP-47733), broke apart in mid-air and crashed 93 km (58 mi) from Olekminsk, Russia, killing all 45 on board; the aircraft may have been shot down by a stray missile although a cause was never definitively identified.

18 August 1968
A United Arab Airlines An-24B (SU-AOL) crashed in the Mediterranean Sea 180 km (112 mi) off Cyprus, killing all 40 passengers and crew on board.

6 October 1968
An Aeroflot An-24B (CCCP-46552) force-landed near Mary, Turkmenistan after an engine failed at 4,200 m (13,780 ft).

24 January 1969
LOT Polish Airlines Flight 149 (SP-LTE) from Warsaw to Wrocław with 48 passengers and crew on board crashed shortly before landing at the Wrocław Airport due to crew error. There were no casualties although the aircraft was written off.

24 March 1969
Aeroflot Flight 2305, an An-24 (CCCP-46751), crashed on climbout from Alma-Ata Airport after the right side engine lost power, killing four of 31 on board.

2 April 1969
LOT Polish Airlines Flight 165 crashed into Polica, a mountain near Zawoja after the pilots became disorientated in a snowstorm, killing all 53 on board.

3 August 1969
Aeroflot Flight N-826, an An-24B (CCCP-46248), crashed at Preobrazhenka, Ukraine after a propeller blade separated and punctured the fuselage, severing the controls for the elevator and ailerons. The crew lost control of the aircraft and the aircraft crashed, killing all 55 on board.

18 August 1969
A Misrair An-24 was hijacked by six people and flown to El Wagah, Egypt.

13 October 1969
Aeroflot Flight 227, an An-24B (CCCP-47772), crashed short of the runway at Nizhnevartovsk Airport after a propeller was inadvertently feathered, killing 24 of 56 on board.

19 October 1969
A LOT Polish Airlines An-24B (SP-LTK) was hijacked by two people and flown to Tegel Airport.

20 November 1969
A LOT Polish Airlines An-24B (SP-LTB) was hijacked by two people and flown to Vienna.

== 1970s ==
1970
An Aeroflot An-24B (CCCP-46241) caught fire and burned out during refueling at Saratov Airport; the accident also could have happened in 1971, when the aircraft was cancelled from the Soviet register.

28 January 1970
An Aeroflot An-24B (CCCP-47701) struck a mountain 25 mi (40 km) from Batagay, Russia after the crew began descending too soon, killing all 34 passengers and crew on board.

30 January 1970
A United Arab Airlines An-24B (SU-AOK) crashed on landing at Luxor Airport after the undercarriage collapsed.

4 February 1970
TAROM Flight 35, an An-24B (YR-AMT), crashed in the Vladeasa mountains in poor visibility, killing 20 of 21 on board. The aircraft was leased from the Romanian government.

10 March 1970
Two passengers attempted to hijack an Interflug An-24V (DM-SBD) to flee to West Germany. Both hijackers, armed with pistols, threatened the flight attendant to open the cockpit door, but the flight attendant warned the pilot with a secret code, so the door remained locked. The hijackers attempted to break down the door while the aircraft returned to East Berlin. The flight attendant tricked the hijackers into believing that the aircraft was landing at Templehof Airport to refuel. After the aircraft landed, the hijackers realized that they had been tricked and shot and killed each other.

14 March 1970
A United Arab Airlines An-24B (SU-AOC) made a wheels-up landing at Cairo International Airport following an engine explosion; all 15 on board survived, but the aircraft was written off. The explosion was caused by a bomb that been placed in the left engine.

1 April 1970
Aeroflot Flight 1661, an An-24B (CCCP-47751), collided in mid-air with a weather balloon and crashed near Toguchin, Russia killing all 45 passengers and crew on board.

5 June 1970
A LOT Polish Airlines An-24 was hijacked by one person who demanded political asylum and diverted to Copenhagen.

19 July 1970
A United Arab Airlines An-24B (SU-ANZ) crashed at Cairo due to pilot error while on a training flight, killing the three crew.

7 August 1970
A LOT Polish Airlines An-24 was hijacked by one person who demanded to be taken to Germany and diverted to East Berlin.

26 August 1970
A LOT Polish Airlines An-24 was hijacked by three people who demanded to be taken to Austria.

16 September 1970
A person, armed with a dagger and gun, attempted to hijack a United Arab Airlines An-24 and demanded to be taken to Saudi Arabia; the hijacker was overpowered by the on-board security guard.

15 October 1970
Aeroflot Flight 244, an An-24B (CCCP-46256), was hijacked by two people who demanded to be taken to Turkey and diverted to Trabzon Airport. One person died.

31 March 1971
An Aeroflot An-24 (CCCP-46747) crashed near Moscow during a training flight.

1 June 1971
An Aeroflot An-24B (CCCP-47729) crashed on Bogodorsk Island during a training flight. The aircraft was flying with one engine shut down when the flight engineer shut down the other engine by mistake.

12 November 1971
Aeroflot Flight N-63, an An-24B (CCCP-46809), stalled and crashed short of the runway at Vinnitsa Airport during a go-around, killing all 48 passengers and crew on board.

13 November 1971
Aeroflot Flight H-639, an An-24B (CCCP-46378) struck a cable and crashed while on approach to Kerch Airport, killing six of 11 on board.

15 November 1971
A Tarom An-24RV (YR-AMA) crashed at Otopeni International Airport during an ILS approach; all 22 passengers and crew on board survived, but the aircraft was written off.

1 December 1971
Aeroflot Flight 2174, an An-24B (CCCP-46788), lost control and crashed near Saratov Airport due to icing, killing all 57 passengers and crew on board.

22 February 1972
Aeroflot Flight 25, an An-24 (CCCP-46732), lost control and crashed near Lipetsk Airport after the pilot applied reverse thrust by mistake; there were no casualties but the aircraft was written off.

27 February 1972
An Aeroflot An-24B (CCCP-46418) lost control and crashed while on approach to Mineralnye Vody Airport after the pilot applied reverse thrust by mistake; there were no casualties but the aircraft was written off.

16 May 1972
The Soviet Navy An-24T 05 struck trees and crashed into a kindergarten building at Svetlogorsk, Russian SFSR, in the Soviet Union, killing all eight on board and 25 to 27 on the ground.

4 November 1972
An Aeroflot An-24B (CCCP-46202) was on a positioning flight when it struck trees and crashed near Vostochny Airport in snow; all three crew survived, but the aircraft was written off.

21 January 1973
Aeroflot Flight 6263, an An-24B (CCCP-46276), lost control and crashed near Bolshesosnovsky District, Russian SFSR, Soviet Union, killing all 39 passengers and crew on board; the aircraft may have been shot down by a missile. Four passengers initially survived the crash, but died in the below-zero temperatures before rescue parties reached the crash site.

28 February 1973
Polish Air Force An-24B 012 crashed near Goleniow Airport, Szczecin due to wing icing. All 18 people on board were killed (including ministers of the interior of Poland and Czechoslovakia).

30 April 1973
A South Yemen Air Force aircraft, probably an An-24, crashed in Yemen, killing all 25 on board. The aircraft type has not been confirmed, with possible types being an An-24, An-12, or a Yemenia Douglas DC-3.

14 May 1973
Cubana Flight 707, an An-24V (CU-T876), crashed on landing at José Martí International Airport in bad weather due to possible pilot errors, killing three.

18 August 1973
Aeroflot Flight A-13, an An-24B (CCCP-46435), struck a cable on an oil rig at Neftyanyye Kamni oilfield (45 km (28 mi) east of Baku) and crashed while attempting to return to Bina International Airport following an uncontained engine failure, killing 56 of 64 on board.

17 September 1973
A MIAT Mongolian Airlines An-24B (BNMAU-4206) struck a mountain during descent in Hovd Province, Mongolia.

6 January 1974
Aeroflot Flight H-75, an An-24B (CCCP-46357), lost control and crashed at Mukachevo, Ukraine due to icing, killing all 24 on board.

25 January 1974
An Aeroflot An-24B (CCCP-46277) was being flown out of Rostov following maintenance when it crashed after takeoff from Rostov Airport due to artificial horizon failure, killing the four crew.

8 March 1974
A Pathet Lao Airlines An-24 (possibly XW-TCA) crashed near Hanoi, killing all 18 on board.

6 July 1974
A Soviet Air Force An-24T lost control and crashed near Sinitsyno, Saratov Oblast after suffering a bird strike on final approach; killing the five crew.

29 December 1974
A TAROM An-24RV (YR-AMD) operating on a domestic scheduled flight from Bucharest to Sibiu struck the side of the mountains (Muntii) Lotrului (22 km south of Sibiu) at 1,700 m (5,600 ft) after the aircraft drifted off course due to crew error, killing all 33 on board.

14 April 1975
Bulgarian Air Force An-24 035 crashed near Sofia.

25 April 1975
An Aeroflot An-24RV (CCCP-46476) crashed short of the runway at Poltava Airport after the pilot descended into ground fog; all 11 on board survived, but the aircraft was written off.

28 June 1975
A Balkan Bulgarian Airlines An-24 was hijacked by one person and diverted to Greece. The hijacker requested political asylum.

17 November 1975
Aeroflot Flight 6274, an An-24RV (CCCP-46467), struck Mount Apshara due to crew disorientation, killing all 38 on board.

20 November 1975
Aeroflot Flight 7950, an An-24B (CCCP-46349), struck a hill 11 mi from Kharkov Airport due to an incorrectly programmed altimeter caused by an ATC error, killing 19 of 50 on board.

22 November 1975
A Balkan Bulgarian Airlines An-24B (LZ-ANA) crashed on takeoff from Vrazhdebna Airport due to icing, killing three of 45 on board.

13 January 1976
An Aeroflot An-24B (CCCP-47280) crashed short of the runway at Smolnoye Airport after the crew descended too soon; all 44 on board survived, but the aircraft was written off.

21 January 1976
A CAAC An-24 (B-492) crashed on approach to Huanghua Airport, killing all 40 on board.

9 February 1976
A Tarom An-24RV (YR-AMC) crashed short of the runway at Bacau Airport due to fog, collapsing the nosegear; all 24 on board survived, but the aircraft was written off.

10 March 1976
An Aeroflot An-24RV (CCCP-46613) landed hard at Saratov Airport after the crew descended too soon; all 57 on board survived, but the aircraft was written off.

18 March 1976
A Cubana An-24B (CU-T879) collided in mid-air with a Cubana DC-8 (CU-T1200) near Havana; the An-24 crashed, killing the five crew; the DC-8 landed safely.

15 May 1976
Aeroflot Flight 1802, an An-24RV (CCCP-46534), crashed near Chernigov due to loss of control caused by an unexplained rudder deflection, killing all 52 on board.

13 August 1976
An Aeroflot An-24B (CCCP-47734) landed hard at Guryev Airport after the crew deviated from the glide path; all 43 on board survived, but the aircraft was written off.

9 September 1976
Aeroflot Flight 7957, an An-24RV (CCCP-46518), collided in mid-air with Aeroflot Flight S-31 (a Yakovlev Yak-40) over the Black Sea off Anapa due to ATC and crew errors, killing all 64 on board both aircraft.

17 December 1976
Aeroflot Flight N-36, an An-24 (CCCP-46722), crashed short of the runway at Zhulyany Airport due to poor visibility, killing 48 of 55 on board.

19 April 1977
A Soviet Air Force An-24 crashed in poor visibility at Moe, Estonia after a wing struck a chimney of a spirit factory, killing all 21 on board. The aircraft was carrying Sukhoi Su-9 pilots from the PVO fighter regiment at Tapa.

26 May 1977
An Aeroflot An-24B (CCCP-46806) was hijacked by one person and diverted to Sweden.

18 June 1977
A Balkan Bulgarian Airlines An-24 from Vidin Airport to Sofia was hijacked shortly after takeoff by one person requesting the plane land in London subsequently Munich, it was forced to land in Belgrade (Serbia, Yugoslavia), where the hijacker was neutralized by the authorities.

8 July 1977
An Aeroflot An-24RV (CCCP-46847) crashed in the Black Sea after takeoff from Sukhumi Airport due to possible pilot distraction, killing six of seven crew.

18 October 1977
A LOT Polish Airlines An-24B (SP-LTH) was hijacked by people who demanded to be taken to Austria.

9 December 1977
Aeroflot Flight 134, an An-24RV (CCCP-47695), crashed and burned after takeoff from Tarko-Sale Airport due to a loss of control, killing 17 of 23 on board. The pilot may have been dazzled by a red light facing the aircraft.

19 April 1978
A LOT Polish Airlines An-24B (SP-LTN) crashed near Rzeszów during a training flight.

28 August 1978
A Romanian Government An-24V (YR-AMV) burned out after landing at Kogalniceanu Airport after a fire started in the cockpit; all six crew jumped from the aircraft and survived.

23 October 1978
Aeroflot Flight 6515, an An-24B (CCCP-46327) crashed in the Gulf of Sivash off Emelyanovka, Ukraine due to loss of control caused by icing and double engine failure, killing all 26 on board.

10 November 1978
A passenger attempted to hijack an Aeroflot An-24B (CCCP-46789) to Turkey. The hijacker injured the flight engineer and fired at the armored cockpit door, but a round ricocheted off the door and hit the hijacker, killing him. The aircraft landed safely at Makhachkala, but was written off on 27 February 1979, apparently suffering some damage in the incident.

17 November 1978
A Romanian Air Force An-24V (YR-AMP) crashed at Arad Airport due to possible icing, killing the five crew.

19 December 1978
An Aeroflot An-24B (CCCP-46299) crashed near Samarkand Airport due to a loss of control while on a training flight, killing the five crew.

1978
An Aeroflot An-24B (CCCP-46350) force-landed near Budyonnovsk, Rostov Oblast, Russia after both engines failed at 6,000 m (20,000 ft) due to icing; all on board survived. The accident occurred in 1977 or 1978 but before 9 November 1978.

15 January 1979
Aeroflot Flight 7502, an An-24B (CCCP-46807), crashed near Minsk-1 International Airport due to tail icing caused by pilot error, killing 13 of 14 on board.

7 February 1979
Vietnam Civil Aviation Flight 226, an Antonov An-24 carrying 36 people, was hijacked by 6 people for asylum to Thailand. A lieutenant killed 4 of them and the other two surrendered.

1 May 1979
A MIAT Mongolian Airlines An-24B (BNMAU-1202) ran off the runway while landing at Erdenet Airport.

3 September 1979
Aeroflot Flight A-513, an An-24B (CCCP-46269) crashed near Amderma Airport due to crew error, killing 40 of 43 on board.

== 1980s ==
20 March 1980
A CAAC An-24RV (B-484) crashed and burned near Changsha Airport, killing all 26 on board.

31 March 1980
An Air Guinee An-24B (3X-GAU) overran the runway on landing at Conakry Airport; all 35 on board survived. The aircraft was probably written off.

14 April 1980
Aeroflot Flight 151, an An-24B (CCCP-47732) with 53 on board, crashed during an emergency landing at Krasnoyarsk Airport after the right main landing gear was damaged on takeoff; after touchdown, the landing gear broke off and the right wing was damaged, causing a fuel leak and fire. Two passengers left the aircraft on the right side and suffered burns; both passengers died later in a hospital.

18 April 1980
An Aeroflot An-24B (CCCP-46220) crashed on takeoff from Bykovo Airport due to crew error; all 47 on board survived, but the aircraft burned out and was written off. The crew had not selected flaps for takeoff.

24 September 1980
An Iraqi Airways An-24TV (YI-AEM) was probably written off while parked at Kirkuk Airport during the Iran–Iraq War. Heavy fighting had been reported in the area at the time.

4 December 1980
A LOT Polish Airlines An-24B (SP-LTB) was hijacked by one person. Shortly after takeoff, the hijacker, armed with what appeared to be a hand grenade, demanded to be flown to West Berlin. The aircraft landed at Templehof where the hijacker was arrested by West Berlin authorities. He requested political asylum and received a four year prison sentence for air piracy.

10 January 1981
A LOT Polish Airlines An-24B (SP-LTB) was hijacked a second time by four people. Carrying sticks of dynamite the hijackers demanded to be flown to the West. The crew convinced them that the aircraft needed to land and refuel before flying beyond Warsaw. Following negotiations, all on board except the pilot and a flight attendant were allowed to leave the aircraft. The hijackers were then convinced that it was easier to switch aircraft instead of refueling. While moving to another aircraft, Polish authorities overpowered and arrested the hijackers.

8 March 1981
An Antonov Design Bureau An-24 (CCCP-46280) struck trees and crashed at Kursk after descending below the glide scope; the aircraft burned out.

26 March 1981
LOT Polish Airlines Flight 691, an An-24B (SP-LTU) from Warsaw to Słupsk with 52 passengers and crew on board, struck a tree and crashed 2 km from Redzikowo Airport while on approach due to a misread altimeter and/or improper operation of the altimeter by the crew. One passenger was killed, 4 or 5 persons were seriously injured.

21 July 1981
A LOT Polish Airlines An-24B (SP-LTI) was hijacked by one person. The hijacker, armed with a pistol and what later turned out to be a dummy grenade, threatened a flight attendant and demanded to be flown to West Berlin. The aircraft landed at Tempelhof Airport where the hijacker was arrested by American authorities and later turned over to West German authorities. He received a five year prison sentence for air piracy.

5 August 1981
A LOT Polish Airlines An-24B (SP-LTI) was hijacked a second time by one person who threatened to blow up the aircraft. The aircraft continued to Gdansk where the hijacker was arrested.

11 August 1981
A LOT Polish Airlines An-24 (SP-LTT) operating a flight from Katowice to Gdańsk was hijacked by one person, who held a knife to a female passenger's throat and demanded to be flown to West Berlin. The pilot changed direction several times to trick the hijacker into think that the plane had landed at West Berlin, but it actually landed at Warsaw instead. Police boarded the aircraft and arrested the hijacker. The same registered plane was used in the Polish TV series "07 zgłoś się", as a hijacked plane.

22 August 1981
LOT Polish Airlines Flight 702 (SP-LTI) was hijacked by one person. Five minutes after takeoff, the hijacker removed a hand grenade from the back of a portable radio, walked to the cockpit and demanded to be flown to Templehof Airport in West Berlin. The aircraft landed at Templehof where the hijacker surrendered to American authorities. He was later turned over to West Berlin authorities and received 5.5 year prison sentence.

24 August 1981
Aeroflot Flight 811, an An-24RV (CCCP-46653), collided in mid-air with Soviet Air Force Tu-16K 07514 over the Zavitinsky District, Russia, killing 31 of 32 on board the An-24 and all six on board the Tu-16.

18 September 1981
A LOT Polish Airlines An-24B (SP-LTG) was hijacked by 12 people. Some ten minutes after takeoff, one man grabbed a female passenger and held a razor blade to her neck. Eleven others (eight men and three women) rose up, broke bottles and brandished them in a threatening manner toward the crew. The hijackers demanded to be flown to West Berlin. The aircraft continued to and landed at Templehof Airport, where the hijackers surrendered to American authorities and later turned over to West Berlin authorities. They were sentenced to one to four years in prison in 1982; four of the sentences were suspended.

22 September 1981
A LOT Polish Airlines An-24B (SP-LTK) was hijacked by four passengers en route from Warsaw to Koszalin. Brandishing sharp instruments, the hijackers threatened a flight attendant and demanded to be flown to West Berlin; the pilot agreed, but he returned to Warsaw instead. Peaceful negotiations failed and the hijackers were taken into custody by force; one hijacker was shot and wounded by police.

29 September 1981
Police boarded a LOT Polish Airlines An-24B (SP-LTP) due to too many passengers, but at this a man held a razor to a passenger's neck and demanded to be flown to West Berlin. Passengers then threatened the hijacker who then moved to the rear of the aircraft where he was arrested.

25 January 1982
A TAROM An-24RV (YR-BMD) crashed near Constanta Airport after the number one propeller feathered due to a feathering system malfunction during a training flight, killing all seven crew.

22 April 1982
An Iraqi Airways An-24B (YI-AEO) crashed in Iraq after the wing struck the ground while on final approach to an airfield.

30 April 1982
A LOT Polish Airlines An-24B (SP-LTG) was hijacked a second time by eight hijackers. The hijackers overpowered the six security personnel (two were injured) on board and flew to West Berlin. Upon landing the hijackers were taken into custody by American authorities who then turned them over to West Berlin authorities; the hijackers requested political asylum. Twenty-eight passengers remained in West Berlin, while the aircraft, its crew and remaining passengers returned to Poland. The hijackers were given two to four years in prison for endangering air traffic.

12 May 1982
Soviet Air Force An-24T 11 stalled and crashed near Petrovsk Air Base during a training flight, killing the five crew; the aircraft was simulating a number one engine failure when the aircraft descended below the glide scope and lost airspeed, causing the aircraft to stall and crash near the runway as the aircraft was too low to recover.

28 August 1982
An Iraqi Airways An-24RV (YI-ALN) crashed on takeoff from Nasiriyah Airport due to landing gear failure.

7 November 1982
An Aeroflot An-24 was hijacked by three passengers and diverted to Turkey; three on board were injured by the hijackers. The aircraft landed at Sinop and the injured were released. The hijackers requested political asylum after surrendering to Turkish authorities.

22 November 1982
A LOT Polish Airlines An-24B (SP-LTK) was hijacked a second time by a security guard and diverted to West Berlin. The hijacker jumped off the plane shortly after landing; the other security guards opened fire on the hijacker, hitting him in the right foot; he was then taken into custody by U.S. officials and turned over to West German authorities. Four passengers requested political asylum in West Berlin.

16 December 1982
Aeroflot Flight 395, an An-24B (CCCP-46567), belly-landed in a field at Sakhansky, Shyriaieve Raion, Ukraine due to smoke in the cockpit caused by an electrical fire; all 27 on board were able to escape before the aircraft burned out. The fire was caused by a short in the wiring of a switch in the heating system due to a design defect.

7 March 1983
Balkan Bulgarian Airlines Flight 013, an An-24B (LZ-AND), was hijacked by four knife-wielding hijackers who demanded to be taken to Vienna, Austria, however the pilot tricked the hijackers by circling over the Black Sea and landing at the partially-lit Varna Airport. Security personnel killed one hijacker who threatened a stewardess and arrested the three remaining hijackers.

25 June 1983
A MIAT Mongolian Airlines An-24RV (BNMAU-8401) lost control and crashed on landing at Buyant Ulaa Airport following engine problems; all 47 on board survived.

24 December 1983
Aeroflot Flight 601, an An-24RV (CCCP-46617) crashed at Leshukonskoye Airport while attempting a go-around following a stall caused by pilot error, killing 44 of 49 on board.

28 January 1984
Aeroflot Flight 928, an An-24RV (CCCP-47310) crashed on approach to Izhevsk Airport due to an elevator control failure caused by improper maintenance, killing four of 53 on board.

18 January 1985
CAAC Flight 5109, an An-24B (B-434), stalled and crashed near Jinan Airport while attempting a missed approach, killing 38 of 41 on board.

22 February 1985
An Air Mali An-24B (TZ-ACT) crashed near Tombouctou Airport while attempting to return to the airport following an engine failure, killing 51 of 52 on board.

April 1985
A MIAT Mongolian Airlines An-24RV (BNMAU-10207) was reported to have crashed while descending to an airport in Khövsgöl Province, Mongolia; the wreckage was reportedly seen at Ulan Bator Airport in 1995.

19 December 1985
Aeroflot Flight 101/435, an An-24, was hijacked by the co-pilot who demanded that the pilot change course. The aircraft ran out of fuel and landed in a pasture near Gannan, China; the hijacker was arrested by Chinese authorities and the 43 people on board were returned to the Soviet Union; the aircraft was flown back to the Soviet Union in January 1986.

2 March 1986
An Aeroflot An-24B (CCCP-46423) stalled and crashed near Bugulma Airport after a propeller feathered due to electrical failure, killing all 38 on board.

5 September 1986
A TAROM An-24RV (YR-AMF) crashed on landing at Cluj Airport after landing with the nose gear up, killing three of five crew; all 50 passengers survived.

15 December 1986
A CAAC An-24RV (B-3413) crashed at Zhongchuan Airport while attempting to return to the airport after an engine failed in icing conditions, killing six of 44 on board.

23 January 1987
A MIAT Mongolian Airlines An-24RV (BNMAU-7710) crashed on landing at Buyant Ulaa Airport.

11 March 1987
Three passengers attempted to hijack Cubana Flight 706 (an An-24RV, CU-T1262) shortly before takeoff from Havana. The hijackers, armed with hand grenades, demanded to be taken to the United States. Passengers struggled with the hijackers, during which one of the grenades exploded, injuring 13 people. One hijacker was killed by a policeman on board while the other two hijackers were arrested.

8 July 1988
An Aeroflot An-24RV (CCCP-46669) collided with buildings after overrunning the runway on takeoff from Khabarovsk Novy Airport.

2 November 1988
LOT Polish Airlines Flight 703 force-landed in a field near Rzeszów after both engines failed due to icing, killing one passenger. The other 24 passengers and four crew on board the aircraft survived, though most of them received serious injuries. In the wake of this accident, LOT removed all An-24 aircraft from service and replaced them with the ATR 42 and ATR 72.

21 January 1989
An Aeroflot An-24 was taxiing at Ivano-Frankovsk Airport when a passenger, armed with a lit torch, attempted to hijack the aircraft and demanded that the crew fly abroad. The hijacker's torch started a fire that burned the pilot and two passengers, but the crew was able to subdue the hijacker.

31 January 1989
A Democratic Republic of Afghanistan Air Force An-24, possibly on a bombing run, was shot down by a Pakistani F-16B near Bannu, Pakistan.

24 April 1989
A China Eastern Airlines Xian Y-7 was hijacked en route from Ningbo to Xiamen by one man. The hijacker, armed with a dagger and carrying dynamite in a backpack, stabbed a flight attendant. He demanded to be flown to Taiwan, but the pilot flew to Fuzhou instead. After landing in Fuzhou, the hijacker realized he had been tricked and blew himself up.

15 August 1989
China Eastern Airlines Flight 5510, an An-24RV (B-3417), crashed on takeoff from Hongqiao Airport due to engine failure, killing 34 of 40 on board.

24 August 1989
An An-24 was written off in a criminal act at Kabul, Afghanistan.

4 October 1989
An Aeroflot An-24RV (CCCP-46525) came in too high and too fast while approaching Stepnogorsk Airport and landed late as a result. The aircraft skidded off the runway and struck a concrete pillar, but the aircraft had suffered severe damage as it also had run across some holes in the ground. The pilot decided to taxi back to the apron, but while taxiing back the aircraft suffered more damage, causing the propeller blades to break off. All 52 on board survived.

21 November 1989
Aeroflot Flight 37577, an An-24B (CCCP-46335), struck trees and crashed near Sovetsky Airport, Russia, killing 34 of 42 on board.

28 December 1989
During the Romanian Revolution, a TAROM An-24RV (YR-BMJ) flying from Bucharest to Belgrade, carrying photojournalist Ian Parry, crashed in bad weather near Vişina, Dâmboviţa, Romania while on a flight to pick up humanitarian supplies, killing all seven (six crew members and the passenger) on board. The aircraft was probably shot down by a missile.

== 1990s ==
9 January 1990
A Sudanese Air Force aircraft, possibly an An-24, was shot down and crashed at Kajo Kaji, South Sudan.

26 January 1990
A MIAT Mongolian Airlines An-24RV (BNMAU-10208) crashed near Ulaangom Airport at night after the crew failed to locate the airport; all 41 on board survived.

22 April 1990
A Lao Aviation An-24RV (RDPL-34008) failed to take off from Luang Namtha Airport and overran the runway; the aircraft struck a building, killing one person on the ground; the three crew on board the aircraft survived.

2 June 1990
An Aeroflot An-24B (CCCP-46551) crashed at Kenkiyak, Kazakhstan after landing hard and overrunning the runway; all 33 passengers and crew on board survived, but the aircraft was written off.

7 October 1990
A person attempted to hijack an Aeroflot An-24 to Sweden; the hijacker threatened to detonate a bomb if the aircraft was not diverted to Stockholm. The hijacker was overpowered by the crew and passengers and was arrested when the aircraft landed in Kotlas.

14 December 1990
An Aeroflot An-24B (CCCP-47164) crashed at Shakhtersk Airport after landing hard and overrunning the runway; all 43 passengers and crew on board survived, but the aircraft was written off.

29 January 1991
An Iraqi Airways An-24V (YI-AEZ) was damaged by bombing at Balad Air Base.

4 March 1991
An Aeroflot An-24 was hijacked by a man who demanded to be flown to Sweden. The hijacker reportedly had an anti-tank grenade and threatened to blow up the aircraft if his demands were not met. The aircraft landed in Leningrad where the hijacker released the 26 passengers but refused to surrender. The grenade exploded, damaging the aircraft and injuring the hijacker, who later died.

23 March 1991
An Aeroflot An-24RV (CCCP-46472) overran the runway at Navoi Airport and struck iron-concrete slabs, killing 34 of 63 on board.

26 September 1991
An AKF Polet An-24 (CCCP-46724) crashed in the Gulf of Finland off Saint Petersburg shortly after takeoff, killing all 10 on board.

26 November 1991
A Tatarstan Airlines An-24RV (CCCP-47823) crashed near Bugulma Airport due to tail icing, killing all 41 (some sources say 42) on board.

22 February 1992
A Trans Amazon An-24RV (OB-1439) overran the runway on landing at Rodriguez Ballon Airport after landing too far down the runway; all 45 on board survived, but the aircraft was written off.

7 April 1992
An Air Bissau An-24RV (J5-GAE) force-landed near Sarra, Libya after flying into a severe sandstorm, killing three of 13 on board; Yasser Arafat was among the survivors.

28 July 1992
A Balkan Bulgarian Airlines An-24B (LZ-ANN) was written off while parked at Sofia Airport due to damage from a falling crane.

2 September 1992
An Aeroflot An-24B (CCCP-46816) landed on its belly near Guryev Airport due to a loss of speed and icing while attempting a missed approach following engine failure; all 49 on board survived, but the aircraft was written off.

21 November 1992
A Yugavia An-24B (RA-46306) bounced on landing at Krasnodar Airport, damaging the nose gear and airframe; all 20 on board survived, but the aircraft was written off.

16 January 1993
A Kazakhstan Airlines An-24RV (46478) crashed short of the runway at Kostanay, Kazakhstan due to engine failure; after hitting the ground, the aircraft slid onto the ramp and struck a parked military An-24; all 23 on board survived.

3 February 1993
A Yakutavia An-24B (47180) ran off the runway on takeoff from Ust-Kuiga due to loss of control; all 27 on board survived, but the aircraft was written off.

6 April 1993
A Latavio Latvian Airlines An-24RV (YL-LCH) overran the runway on landing at Stepanavan Airport following nosegear collapse after landing nosewheel-first; all 32 on board survived, but the aircraft was written off.

28 December 1993
A Fujian Airlines Xian Y-7 was hijacked to Taiwan by a Chinese couple accompanied by their daughter. The hijackers handed a note to a flight attendant, threatening to blow up the aircraft unless it flew to Taiwan. The male hijacker overpowered the flight attendant and demanded that the pilots open the cockpit door. When the door opened, the hijacker handed the note to the pilot. The aircraft continued to Taipei and after landing, the hijackers surrendered and handed over the device, with was nothing more than an empty vitamin bottle with four batteries, matches, wires and nails. The hijackers were detained in Taiwan on air piracy charges.

1 February 1994
A Kolyma-Avia An-24B (RA-47718) veered off the runway into a mound of packed snow while taking off from Omsukchan Airport; all 53 on board survived, but the aircraft was written off.

8 May 1994
A Cubana An-24 was hijacked by the pilot; after forcing the co-pilot out of the cockpit, the pilot locked himself inside and diverted the aircraft to Miami, Florida where he requested political asylum. The remaining six crew flew back to Cuba with the aircraft; the 16 passengers- none of which were Cuban citizens- were released to continue their vacations.

17 July 1994
Bykovo Avia Flight 86, an An-24B (RA-46575), sank back on the runway during takeoff from Kherson Airport after the flight engineer raised the landing gear too soon; the aircraft slid down the runway on its belly and stopped 1,650 m (5,410 ft) from the beginning of the runway. All 32 on board survived.

13 August 1994
An Uzbekistan Air Force An-24 was involved in an accident in Uzbekistan.

6 February 1995
An Arkhangelsk Airlines An-24B (RA-46564) ran off the side of the runway while landing at Talaghy Airport and struck a snowbank; all 38 on board survived, but the aircraft was written off.

21 September 1995
MIAT Flight 557, an An-24RV (BNMAU-10103), struck a mountain near Choho Geologoh Uul in bad weather after the crew descended too soon; of the 43 on board, only a passenger survived.

1 November 1995
A Kazakhstan Airlines An-24B (UN-47710) landed hard short of the runway at Shymkent during a training flight; while on approach the left engine was shut down and airspeed decreased. Instead of increasing power to the right engine, it too was shut down. A hard landing was performed 1,100 m (3,600 ft) short of the runway.

13 December 1995
Banat Air Flight 166, an An-24B (YR-AMR), crashed on takeoff from Verona Airport due to wing icing and overloading, killing all 49 passengers and crew on board. The aircraft was chartered from Romavia.

21 December 1995
A Kuban Airlines An-24RV (RA-46473) was written off after the nosegear collapsed on landing at Krasnodar Airport.

29 December 1995
A Saransk Flight Unit An-24B (RA-46401) crashed on approach to Saransk when the left wing touched the ground while in a steep turn; all five on board survived, but the aircraft was written off.

22 February 1996
A Romanian CAA An-24RV (YR-BMK) crashed near Baia Mare Airport after the pilot executed a turn incorrectly, killing all eight on board as well as two on the ground.

25 February 1996
A Kampuchea Airlines An-24RV (XU-314) overran the runway on landing at Ratanakiri Airport due to brake failure; several tires blew and the aircraft crashed into a building. All 42 on board survived.

3 May 1996
A Federal Airlines An-24RV (ST-FAG) crashed near Haj Yousif, Sudan while attempting a forced landing following several failed approaches, killing all 53 passengers and crew on board.

6 November 1996
Sakha Avia Flight 17, an An-24RV (RA-47356), landed on a runway that was under construction at Ust-Nera Airport. ATC warned the crew during final approach, but it was too late. The pilot attempted a go-around during landing, but the co-pilot aborted the attempt seconds later. The flight engineer then raised the landing gear and the aircraft came to rest on its belly, suffering severe damage.

18 March 1997
Stavropolskaya Aktsionernaya Avia Flight 1023, an An-24RV (RA-46516), crashed into a forest at Cherkessk, Russia due to structural failure, killing all 50 on board.

20 March 1997
A Sudanese Air Force An-24TV crashed near Juba Airport due to engine failure, killing the four crew; the aircraft was possibly shot down.

11 July 1997
Cubana Flight 787, an An-24RV (CU-T1262), crashed off Santiago, Cuba due to a loss of control, killing all 44 passengers and crew on board.

29 September 1998
Lionair Flight 602, an An-24RV (EW-46465), fell into the sea off the north-western coast of Sri Lanka under mysterious circumstances. The aircraft departed Jaffna-Palaly Air Force Base on a flight to Colombo and disappeared from radar screens just after the pilot had reported depressurization. Initial reports indicated that the plane had been shot down by Liberation Tigers of Tamil Eelam rebels. All 7 crew and 48 passengers were killed. The aircraft had been leased from Gomelavia.

== 2000s ==
15 November 2000
An ASA Pesada An-24RV (D2-FCG) crashed shortly after takeoff from Quatro de Fevereiro Airport, Luanda, Angola, due to loss of control, killing all 57 on board.

1 December 2000
An An-24 was hijacked by two people who demanded to be flown to western Congo. One hijacker was killed by a DR Congo rebel after he attempted to enter the cockpit. The second hijacker fired several rounds before being subdued, but none of the other 15 on board were injured. The surviving hijacker was held for questioning; lax security at Goma Airport was blamed for the incident.

4 April 2001
A Sudanese Air Force An-24 crashed on take-off in Adaril near Malakal.

October 2001
Three Ariana Afghan Airlines An-24s (YA-DAH, YA-DAJ and YA-DAG) were destroyed on the ground at Kabul, Afghanistan during a U.S. bombing raid.

13 July 2002
A Sakha Avia An-24RV (RA-46670) landed wheels-up at Yakutsk Airport during a training flight due to crew error; all four crew survived, but the aircraft was written off.

31 March 2003
A Cubana An-24 (CU-T1294) was hijacked by a man who was believed to have had two grenades. The aircraft then flew to Havana for refueling; after 26 passengers were released, the aircraft flew to Key West, Florida.

25 April 2003
A Sudanese Air Force An-24 (tail number 700) was destroyed on the ground at El Fasher Airport during a Sudan Liberation Army rebel attack.

14 June 2003
A Cubana An-24RV (CU-T1295) ran off the runway at Rafael Cabrera Airport due to hydraulic system failure; all 52 passengers and crew on board survived, but the aircraft was written off.

16 September 2004
A Kam Air An-24RV (EW-74808) overran the runway at Khwaja Rawash Airport after returning to the airport following engine failure.

4 March 2005
A Trans Air Congo An-24B (EY-46399) ran off the runway at Impfondo Airport.

16 March 2005
Regional Airlines Flight 9288, an An-24RV (RA-46438), stalled and crashed into a small hill near Varandey, Russia due to possible instrument failure, killing 28 of 52 on board. The aircraft was on lease from Kuzbass Aero Freight.

2 June 2005
Marsland Aviation Flight 430, an An-24B (ST-WAL), crashed on takeoff from Khartoum Civil Airport, killing seven of 42 on board. The aircraft was on lease from al-Majal Company.

16 July 2005
An Equatorial Express Airlines An-24B crashed into a jungle near Baney shortly after takeoff, killing all 60 people on board. The aircraft was overloaded; it was designed for a maximum of 48 people, not 60. The crash remains the worst air disaster in Equatorial Guinea and the worst air disaster involving the An-24.

2 November 2005
An SAT Airlines An-24 (RA-46618) landed hard at Yuzhno-Sakhalinsk Airport, collapsing the nose gear.

23 December 2005
An Aero-Service An-24RV (ER-AZX) ran off the runway at Pokola, Congo. The aircraft was on lease from Pecotox Air.

19 January 2006
Slovak Air Force An-24B 5605 with 43 persons on board (of which 28 were soldiers) crashed in Hungary, only 3 km from the Slovak border. Only one person survived, and 42 were reported dead. The plane was carrying Slovak KFOR forces that had been serving in Kosovo for half a year. The accident remains the worst in Hungary.

23 March 2006
A Valan International Cargo Charter An-24B (ER-AZZ) force-landed at Talil, Iraq due to engine failure.

25 June 2007
PMTair Flight 241 crashed in mountains 130 km south of the capital Phnom Penh. The flight was en route from Siem Reap, near the historic Angkor Wat temples, to the coastal town of Sihanoukville. All 22 on board were killed.

18 July 2007
A Malift Air aircraft, probably an An-24, crashed shortly after takeoff from Bandundu Airport due to engine failure.

July 2007
An Aquiline An-24B (EX-030) crashed in Ethiopia due to engine failure.

18 September 2008
A EuroLine An-24RV (4L-MJX) landed hard at Tbilisi Airport, breaking the nose gear.

13 January 2009
A Daallo Airlines An-24RV (S9-KAS) landed nosegear-up at Bender Qassim International Airport after the nosegear failed to come down while on approach. All 15 on board survived, but the aircraft was written off.

18 May 2009
A Phoenix Avia aircraft, probably An-24T (EK-46839), ran off the runway on takeoff from Aba Tenna D Yilma Airport in heavy fog; all four crew survived, but the aircraft was written off.

August 2009
An Uzbekistan Airways An-24RV (UK-46658) was reportedly written off after the landing gear was raised too soon during takeoff from Zarafshan Airport.

2 November 2009
Daallo Airlines Flight 774, an An-24RV (EY-46793) was hijacked en route between Bossaso and Djibouti; two passengers wielded guns and demanded to be flown to Las Qorey. The hijackers were overpowered by passengers; the aircraft returned to Bossaso where the hijackers were arrested.

== 2010s ==
4 February 2010
Yakutia Airlines Flight 425, operated by RA-47360 suffered an engine failure on take-off from Yakutsk Airport for Olekminsk Airport. During the subsequent landing, the nose and port main undercarriage were retracted, causing substantial damage to the aircraft.

17 May 2010
Pamir Airways Flight 112 crashed 100 km away from Kabul International Airport. The plane was en route from Kunduz Airport to Kabul, when it suddenly disappeared from radar. The aircraft was found two days later in the Salang Pass; all 44 on board were killed.

3 August 2010
Katekavia Flight 9357 crashed on approach to Igarka Airport, Russia. Twelve people were killed. The aircraft was on a domestic scheduled passenger flight from Krasnoyarsk Airport.

11 November 2010
A Tarco Airlines An-24 from Khartoum International Airport crashed on landing at Zalingei Airport, Sudan. There were two fatalities. One person received serious injuries and another five escaped with minor injuries The remaining 32 passengers and five crew escaped injury.

14 December 2010
Nordavia Flight 137, an An-24RV (RA-47305), overran the runway on landing at Rogachevo Air Base, collapsing the right main landing gear; all 39 on board survived, but the aircraft was written off.

2011
A Katekavia An-24RV landed hard at Chita Airport during 2011; the accident occurred between 30 March when the aircraft was seen active at Bodaybo and 29 December when it was removed from the Russian register.

11 July 2011
Angara Airlines Flight 9007, an Antonov An-24 (registration RA-47302) operating from Tomsk to Surgut, Russia, suffered an in-flight engine fire, prompting the crew to ditch the aircraft in the Ob River. Of the 37 people on board, 7 passengers were killed. The aircraft was written off.

8 August 2011
IrAero Flight 103 overran the runway on landing at Blagoveshchensk Airport, Russia. Twelve of the 36 people on board were injured.

28 April 2012
Jubba Airways flight 6J-711 blew both right main gear tires on landing, causing the aircraft to veer off the runway at Abdullahi Yusuf International Airport in Galkayo, Somalia. The wing separated from the body of the aircraft. No injuries were reported, although the aircraft was substantially damaged.

13 February 2013
South Airlines Flight 8971 stalled and crashed on landing at Donetsk International Airport while on an internal Ukrainian flight between Odessa and Donetsk following a loss of airspeed caused by pilot error, killing five of 52 on board.

9 August 2013
An Ethiopian Air Force An-24 crashed at Mogadishu International Airport while carrying ammunition, killing four of the six crew.

22 January 2014
A Pskovavia An-24RV (RA-46473) suffered serious damage while landing at Moscow's Domodedovo Airport when the aircraft touched down between the runway and the airport boundary.

27 June 2019
Angara Airlines Flight 200 overran the runway on landing at Nizhneangarsk Airport, Russia. Two of the 47 people on board were killed.

== 2020s ==
19 August 2022
An airport employee at Beloyarsk Airport died after being hit by the propeller of an An-24 aircraft of UTair Airlines.
24 July 2025
Angara Airlines Flight 2311, an An-24RV, carrying 42 passengers and 6 crew, plummeted into a hillside about 16 km (10 miles) from Tynda, in Siberia. There were no survivors.
