= Tomsk Avia =

Russian airline

Tomsk Avia, LLC (Russian: ООО Авиакомпания «Томск Авиа»)
IATA	ICAO	Call sign
-	TSK	TOMSK-AVIA
- Founded: 1992
- Ceased operations: 2015
- Hubs: Tomsk, Russia
- Fleet size: 22
- Destinations: 6
- Headquarters: Tomsk, Russia
- Website: www.tomskavia.ru

Tomsk Avia, LLC (Russian: ООО Авиакомпания «Томск Авиа») was an airline based at Bogashevo Airport in Tomsk, Russia. It operated domestic passenger and cargo services and charters until 2015.

== History ==
The airline was established in 1992 from the Aeroflot Tomsk division (established in 1932) and merged with Kolpashevo Air Enterprise in 1999. Formerly called Tomsk Production Aviation Amalgamation and Tomsk State Aviation Enterprise.

In April 2015, the airline's Air operator's certificate was suspended by Rosaviatsia as a result of the carrier's financial difficulties. Tomsk Avia's AOC was officially canceled in July 2015

The airline's debt had become a concern to Russian aviation authorities. The company's director was charged with 18 criminal offenses including failing to obey the court's orders regarding the debts. In March 2015, court officers seized two airports owned by the carrier, Strezhevoy Airport and Kargasok.

After the suspension, the fleet of Antonov An-24 and Antonov An-26 aircraft was seized and sold.

== Destinations ==
Tomskavia operated scheduled flights to the following domestic destinations:

Altai Republic

- Gorno-Altaysk - Gorno-Altaysk Airport

Altai Krai

- Barnaul - German Titov Barnaul International Airport

Kemerovo Oblast

- Kemerovo - Kemerovo International Airport
- Novokuznetsk - Spichenkovo Airport

Khakassia

- Abakan - Abakan Airport

Novosibirsk Oblast

- Novosibirsk - Tolmachevo Airport

Tomsk Oblast

- Strezhevoy - Strezhevoy Airport
- Tomsk - Bogashevo Airport

Tyumen Oblast

- (Khanty-Mansi Autonomous Okrug) Khanty-Mansi Autonomous District
  - Nizhnevartovsk - Nizhnevartovsk Airport
  - Surgut - Surgut Airport

== Fleet ==
The Tomskavia fleet included the following aircraft in July 2012):

- 6 Antonov An-24
- 2 Antonov An-26
- 1 Cessna 208B Grand Caravan
- 13 Mil Mi-8T
