= Angara Airlines Flight 2311 =

2025 aviation accident in Russia

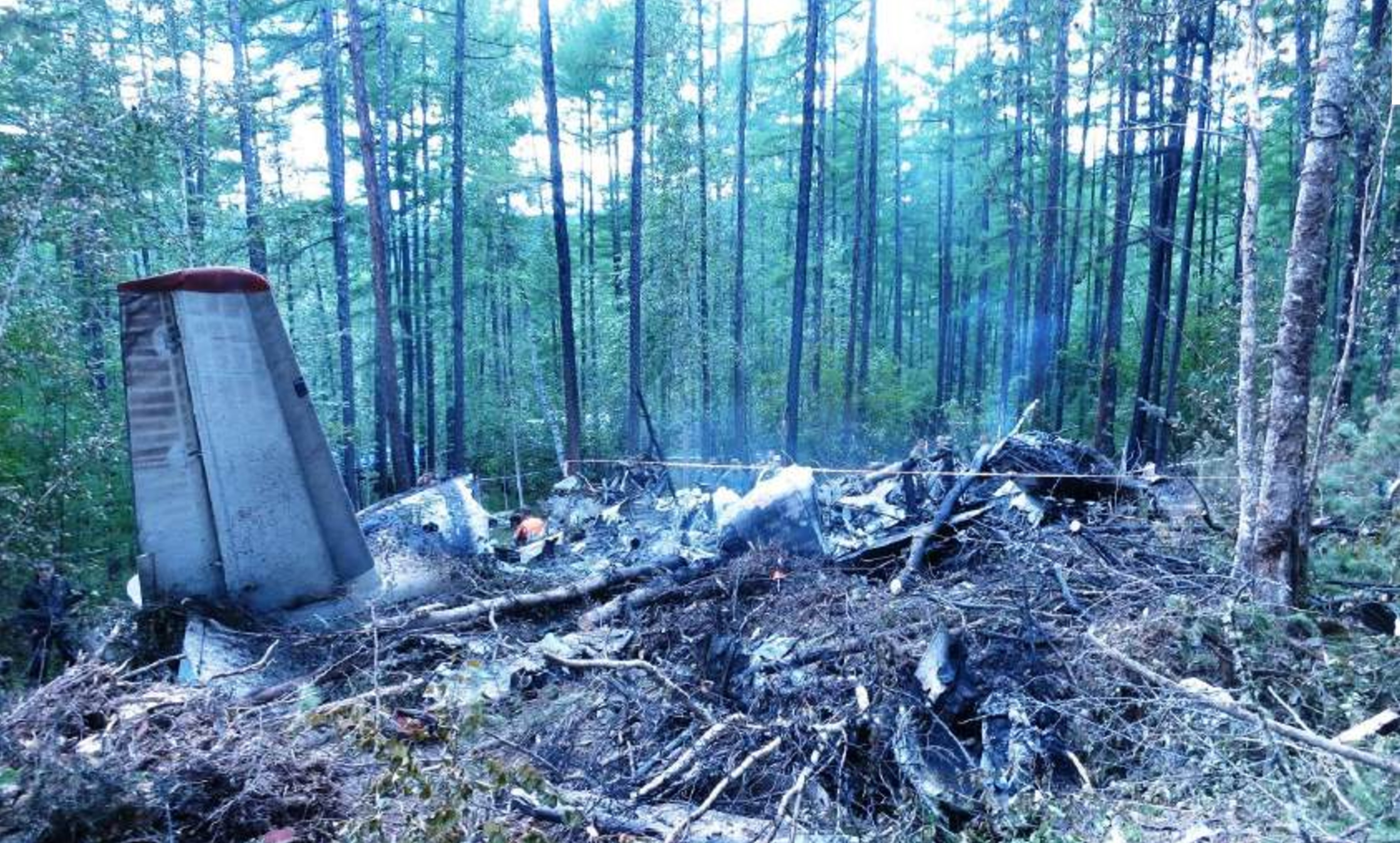
- Wreckage of the aircraft

Accident
- Date: 24 July 2025
- Summary: Controlled flight into terrain due to pilot error
- Site: Near Tynda, Amur Oblast, Russia; 55.20°N 124.57°E

Aircraft
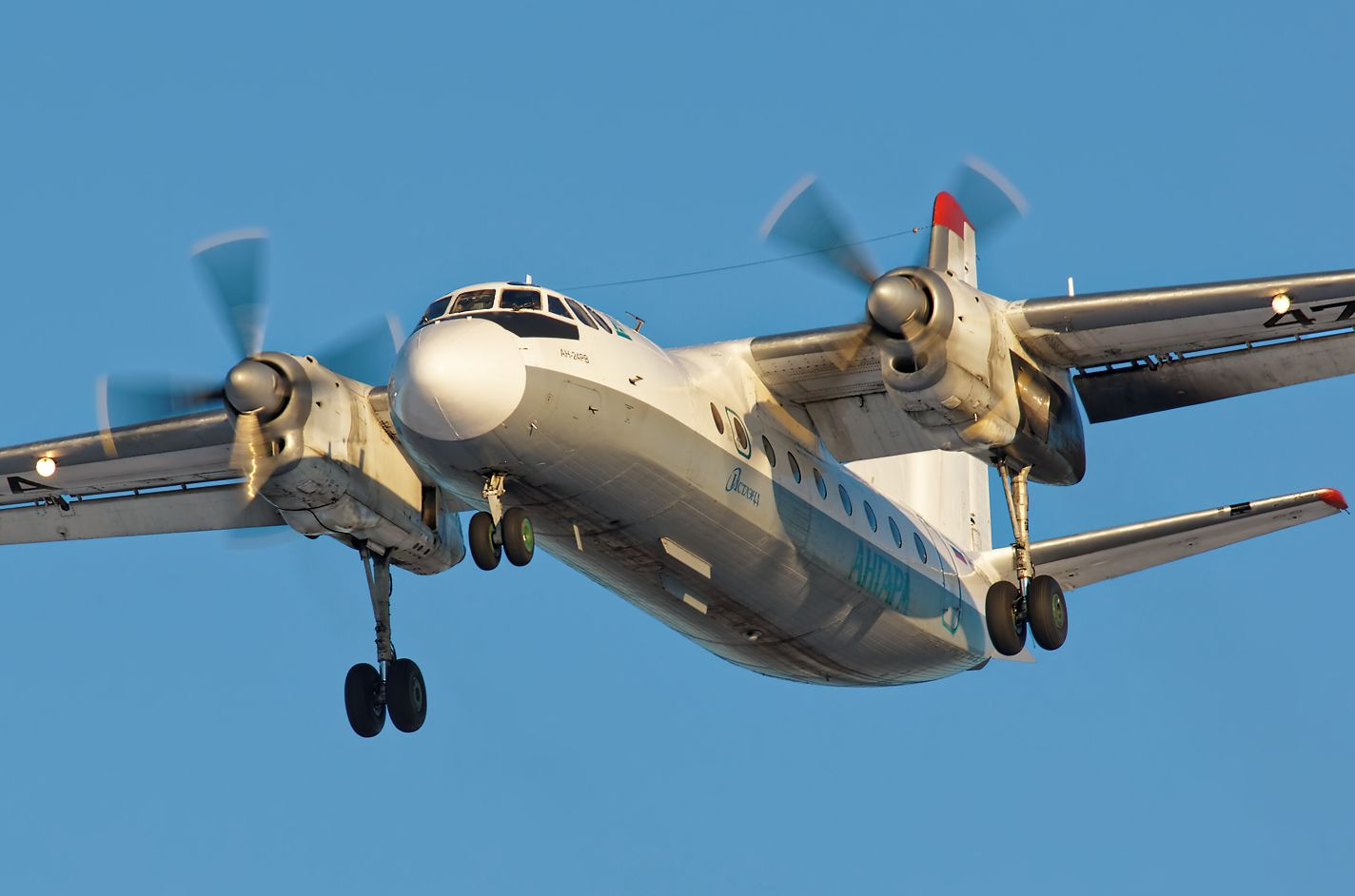
- RA-47315, the aircraft involved in the accident, seen in 2022 with a previous livery
- Aircraft type: Antonov An-24RV
- Operator: Angara Airlines
- IATA flight No.: 2G2311
- ICAO flight No.: AGU2311
- Call sign: SARMA 2311
- Registration: RA-47315
- Flight origin: Ignatyevo Airport, Blagoveshchensk, Russia
- Destination: Tynda Airport, Tynda, Russia
- Occupants: 48
- Passengers: 42
- Crew: 6
- Fatalities: 48
- Survivors: 0

Angara Airlines Flight 2311 was a scheduled domestic flight from Ignatyevo Airport to Tynda Airport, operated by Angara Airlines. On 24 July 2025, an Antonov An-24 operating that flight crashed in Amur Oblast, Russia during its second landing attempt in poor visibility. The crashed site is about 16 kilometres (10 miles) from Tynda airport into a forest near Tynda in eastern Russia. All 42 passengers and 6 crew members on board died.

== Background ==
=== Aircraft ===
The aircraft involved, manufactured on 29 January 1976, was a 49-year-old Antonov An-24RV registered as RA-47315. It first flew for Aeroflot before the Soviet Union's dissolution in 1991. The aircraft also flew for Nizhny Novgorod Airlines, Kampuchea Airlines, KurskAvia, Izhavia, Aeroservis and RusLine. At the time of the crash, Angara Airlines operated 10 Antonov An-24 aircraft, all built between 1972 and 1976. Rosaviatsia said that the aircraft had been involved in four incidents since 2018, and officials said it had passed a recent technical inspection. The aircraft's airworthiness certificate was renewed in 2021 with a validity lasting until 2036.

=== Passengers and crew ===
There were forty-two passengers and six crew members on board the aircraft. The passengers included five children. Five of the passengers were employees of the Russian Railways company. An oncologist was also on board. One of the passengers was a Chinese national.

The captain was 61-year-old Vyacheslav Logvinov, a graduate of the Talgat Bigeldinov Military Institute of the Air Defence Forces. He had previously worked for IrAero before joining Angara Airlines. Logvinov accumulated nearly 6,000 hours on An-24s and An-26s, from a total of 11,200 hours. The first officer was 37-year-old Kirill Plaksin, who logged over 1,900 hours on An-24s. The flight engineer was 30-year-old Vladimir Vokhmintsev. There was one flight attendant and two aircraft mechanics on board.

== Accident ==
The plane landed at Ignatyevo Airport at 08:20 to refuel and let new passengers board before taking off again at 11:20. The plane was originally scheduled to depart at 09:10 but there was a 1-hour and 35 minute delay due to poor weather. According to Interfax, the flight route included stops at Khabarovsk, Blagoveshchensk and Tynda. At the time of the crash, the flight was nearing its final destination of Tynda, a city in Amur Oblast, when it disappeared from radar. The aircraft had made a missed final approach in the poor visibility around Tynda airport and had to make a second attempt to land, during which it failed to report at a checkpoint. Contact with the aircraft was lost at 13:00 VLAT (UTC+10:00). No distress calls were received from the flight crew.

At the time of the accident, the winds were blowing northeast at 7 km/h (4 kn), visibility was unlimited (more than 10 km or 6 mi) with light rain, scattered cumulonimbus clouds at 210 metres (690 ft), and other broken clouds at 600 metres (2,000 ft). The temperature was 17 °C (63 °F) with a QNH pressure of 1002 hPa.

The burning wreckage of the aircraft was found at 17:30 by a Rosaviatsiya rescue helicopter, 16 kilometres (10 miles) from Tynda. Russian media reported the wreckage was located on a mountainside with no survivors. There were no roads to the crash site so a rescue team numbering more than 100 people used heavy machinery to cut a path. Rescuers reached the crash site at 23:00. Ground access to the site was hampered by the remote and swampy terrain.

== Aftermath ==
Three days of mourning were declared in Amur Oblast and Khabarovsk Krai for the victims of the crash. Transport minister Andrey Nikitin said that ₽5 million (US$63,000) each were to be given as compensation to the families of the victims. The leaders of Armenia, India, Belarus, China, Egypt and Kazakhstan sent their condolences to Russian president Vladimir Putin over the crash.

On 27 October 2025, the Russian aviation regulator Rosaviatsia ordered the revocation of Angara Airlines' operating license effective November.

== Investigation ==
An investigation was opened into the cause of the crash by the Investigative Committee of Russia and the Interstate Aviation Committee. The aircraft's flight recorders were recovered a day after the crash. Investigators were able to recover data from the cockpit voice recorder (CVR), but the flight data recorder (FDR) was destroyed by the post-crash fire. Preliminary analysis of the CVR did not reveal any problems with any of the aircraft's systems. Russian investigators have indicated that an altimeter pressure-reference error contributed to the crash. The Federal Air Transport Agency classified the accident as a controlled flight into terrain. On 9 February 2026, the IAC released their final report, which concluded that the accident had been caused by an incorrect altimeter setting. Accident report is also available in English language.

== See also ==
- 2025 in aviation
- List of accidents and incidents involving the Antonov An-24
- List of unrecovered and unusable flight recorders
- Similar accidents and incidents:
  - 1961 President Airlines Douglas DC-6 crash, a DC-6 that crashed due to faulty instrument and poor weather; 83 killed, 1961
  - 2012 Kazakhstan Antonov An-72 crash, an Antonov An-72 that crashed due to a faulty altimeter and poor visibility; 27 killed, 2012
