= Angara Airlines =

Russian airline

Angara Airlines Авиакомпания «Ангара»

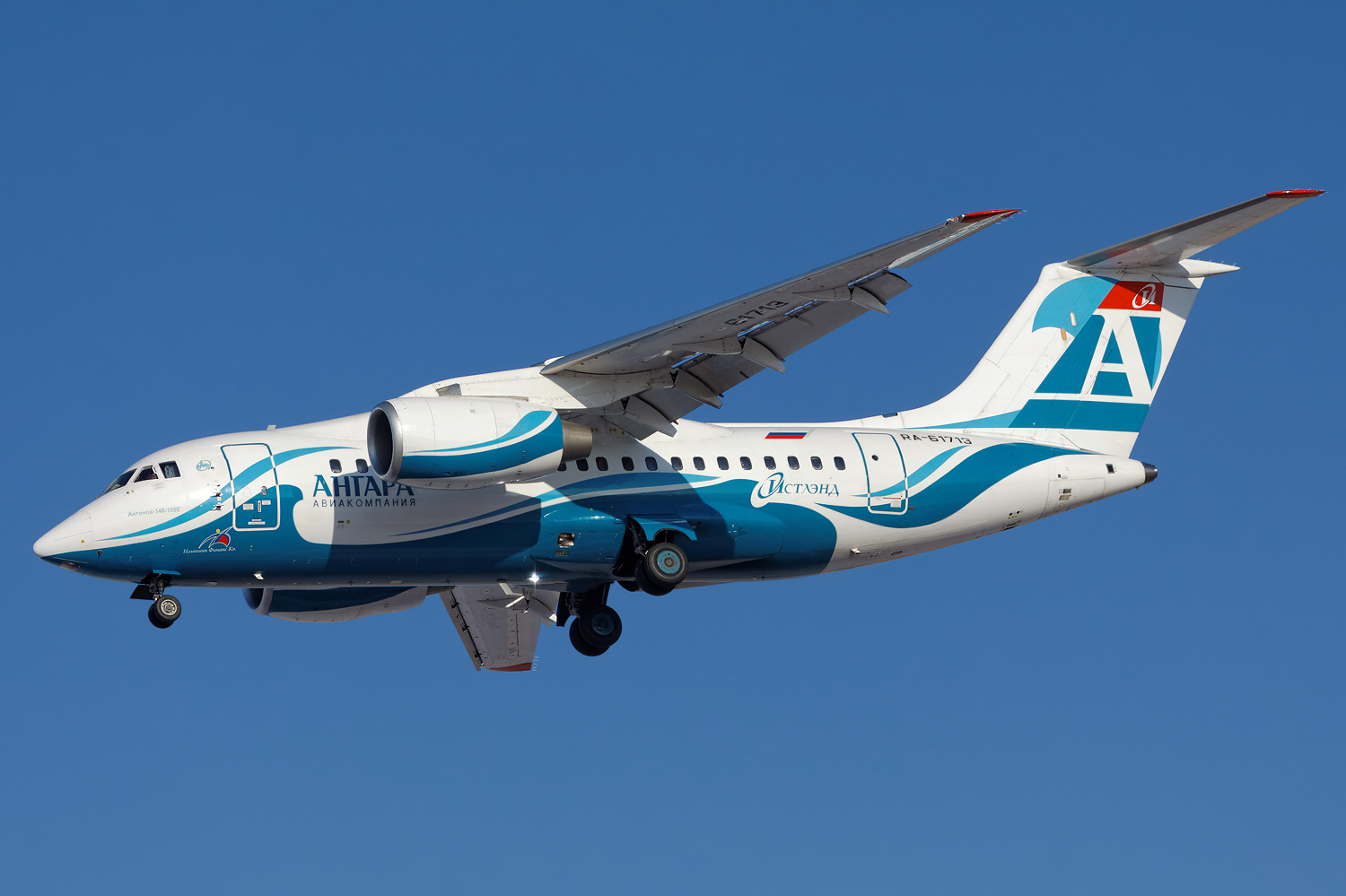
IATA	ICAO	Call sign
2G	AGU	SARMA
- Founded: 2000; 25 years ago
- Ceased operations: November 5, 2025; 45 days ago
- Hubs: Irkutsk International Airport
- Secondary hubs: Tolmachevo International Airport
- Focus cities: Baikal International Airport; Kadala Airport
- Fleet size: 21
- Destinations: 16
- Headquarters: Irkutsk, Russia
- Key people: Anatoly Fedorovich Yurtayev (CEO)
- Website: angara.aero

JSC Angara Airlines (Russian: ЗАО «Авиакомпания „Ангара“», romanized: ZAO "Aviakompaniya 'Angara'") was an airline based in Irkutsk, Russia. It was named after the Angara River.

== History ==
Established in 2000, it operated on behalf of its owner, the Irkut Corporation aircraft repair factory out of Irkutsk International Airport. With base airports in Irkutsk and Novosibirsk, Angara Airlines operated scheduled flights in the Siberian region and to other regions in the Russian Federation, as well as an international connection to Manzhouli, China. Besides the scheduled flights, Angara Airlines also offered charter transportation, VIP transportation and freight and mail services.

In July 2017, it was announced that the airline had signed a letter of intent for three Irkut MC-21-300s at the MAKS Air Show in Moscow. The airline had yet to decide which engines would be chosen for the aircraft. The aircraft, when an order is placed, were originally scheduled to be delivered from 2022 to 2025.

As with all Russian airlines since 2022, it was banned from flying into EU airspace.

On 27 October 2025, it was reported that the Russian civil aviation authority Rosaviatsiya would revoke Angara Airlines air operator's certificate on 5 November 2025, effectively grounding the airline. The decision was made over flight safety concerns following the fatal crash of Angara Airlines Flight 2311 in July 2025.

== Destinations ==
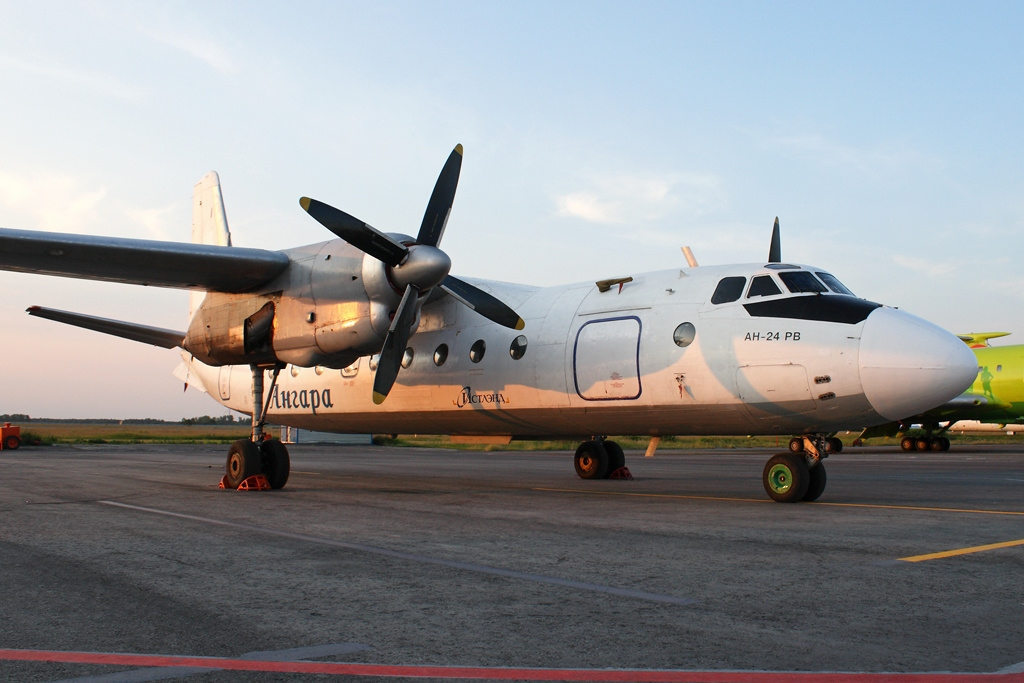
Angara Antonov An-24RV

As of May 2022, Angara Airlines served the following destinations:

Russia

- Amur Oblast
  - Blagoveschensk – Ignatyevo Airport
  - Talakan – Talakan Airport
  - Tynda – Tynda Airport
  - Zeya – Zeya Airport
- Buryatia
  - Nizhneangarsk – Nizhneangarsk Airport
  - Taksimo – Taksimo Airport
  - Ulan-Ude – Baikal International Airport
- Irkutsk Oblast
  - Bodaybo – Bodaybo Airport
  - Bratsk – Bratsk Airport
  - Yerbogachen – Erbogachen Airport
  - Irkutsk – Irkutsk International Airport
  - Kirensk – Kirensk Airport
  - Mama – Mama Airport
  - Ust-Kut – Ust-Kut Airport
- Khabarovsk Krai
  - Khabarovsk – Khabarovsk Novy Airport
- Sakha
  - Lensk – Lensk Airport
- Sakhalin
  - Nogliki – Nogliki Airport
  - Okha – Okha Airport
  - Shakhtyorsk – Shakhtyorsk Airport
- Zabaykalsky Krai
  - Chara – Chara Airport
  - Chita – Kadala Airport

== Fleet ==
The Angara Airlines fleet included the following aircraft (as of May 2022):

Aircraft	Total	Orders	Passengers	Notes
Antonov An-2	2	—	12	
Antonov An-24RV	5	—	48	Three crashed as flights AGU200 (2019), AGU9007 (2011) and AGU2311 (2025).
Antonov An-26-100	3	—	43	
Mil Mi-8	11	—	22	
Antonov An-148-100E	5	—	68	All Retired
Total	21	—		

== Accidents ==
- July 11, 2011: Angara Airlines Flight 9007, an Antonov An-24 (registration RA-47302) operating from Tomsk to Surgut, Russia, suffered an in-flight engine fire, prompting the crew to ditch the aircraft in the Ob River. Of the 37 people on board, 7 passengers were killed. The aircraft was written off.
- July 27, 2019: Angara Airlines Flight 200, an Antonov An-24 (registration RA-47366) operating a flight from Nizhneangarsk to Ulan-Ude, Russia, suffered an engine failure shortly after takeoff. The aircraft skidded off the runway after attempting to make an emergency landing, then hit a building and caught fire. Of the 47 people on board, 2 crew members were killed and 7 others were injured. The aircraft was written off.
- July 24, 2025: Angara Airlines Flight 2311, an Antonov An-24 operating a flight from Blagoveshchensk to Tynda, Russia, carrying 42 passengers, including 5 children, and 6 crew members, crashed near its destination, killing all onboard.
