= Angara Airlines Flight 9007 =

2011 aviation accident

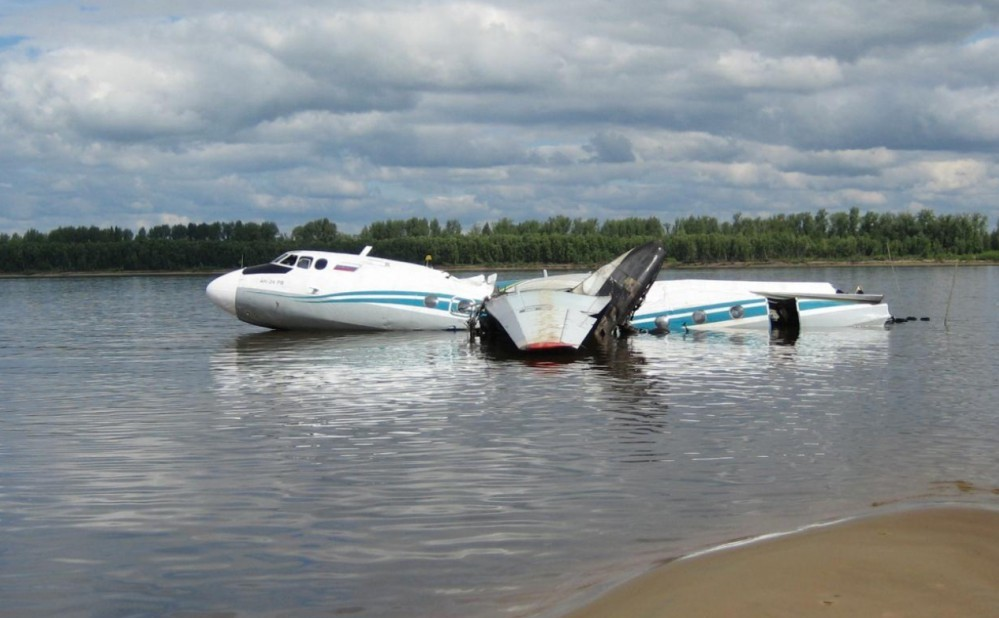
- Wreckage of the aircraft in the Ob

Accident
- Date: 11 July 2011
- Summary: Ditching following engine fire
- Site: 15 km SW of Strezhevoy, Tomsk Oblast, Russia; 60°37.237′N 77°22.735′E

Aircraft
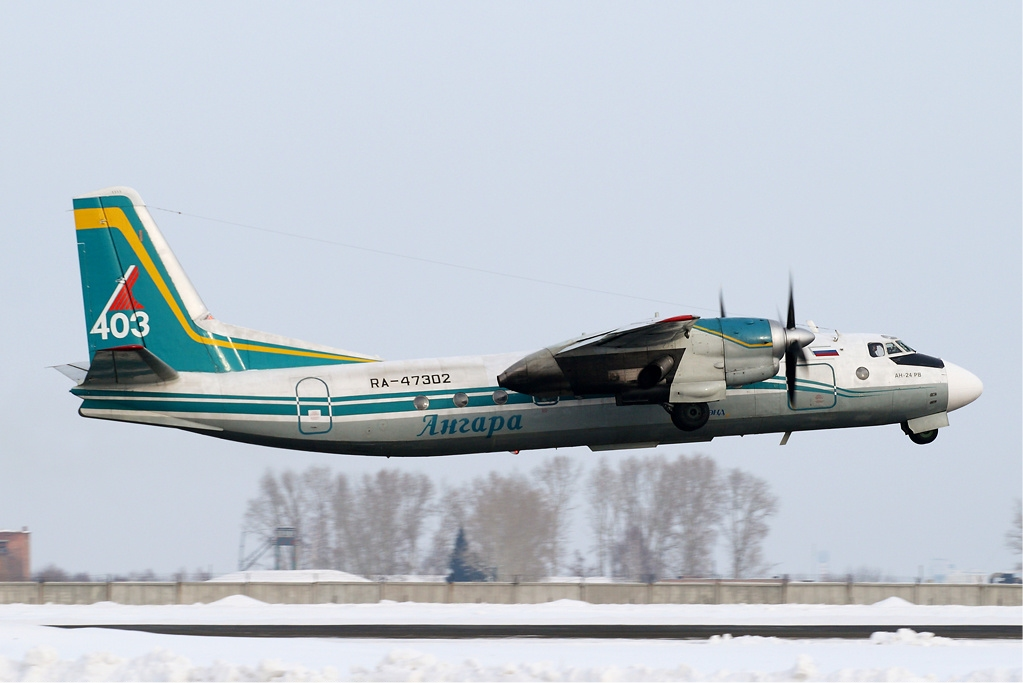
- RA-47302, the aircraft involved in the accident, seen in February 2011
- Aircraft type: Antonov An-24RV
- Operator: Angara Airlines on behalf of Tomsk Avia
- IATA flight No.: 2G9007
- ICAO flight No.: AGU9007
- Call sign: SARMA 9007
- Registration: RA-47302
- Flight origin: Bogashevo Airport, Tomsk, Russia
- Destination: Surgut International Airport, Surgut, Russia
- Occupants: 37
- Passengers: 33
- Crew: 4
- Fatalities: 7
- Injuries: 19
- Survivors: 30

On 11 July 2011, Angara Airlines Flight 9007, an Antonov An-24 turboprop passenger aircraft on a domestic service from Tomsk to Surgut, Russia, ditched into the Ob River, after suffering an engine fire. Seven of the 37 people on board died.

== Accident ==
External videos
- Amateur footage of the incident on YouTube

Angara Airlines flight IK9007 (also designated as Tomsk Avia flight SP5007), took off from Bogashevo Airport in Tomsk at 10:10 local time (UTC+7) on 11 July bound for Surgut International Airport, with 4 crew and 33 passengers on board.

At around 11:36, while the aircraft was cruising at 6,000 metres (20,000 ft), a magnetic chip detector signalled the presence of particles in the port (left) engine's oil system. The captain decided to continue the flight, but 8 minutes later a burning smell filled the cockpit and the fire alarm on the port engine briefly activated. The engine was throttled back but not shut down, and the bleed air supply was closed.

The crew initiated a diversion to Nizhnevartovsk Airport, and at 11:52, following a sudden drop in the oil pressure and the onset of severe vibrations, the crew realised that the engine was indeed on fire, at which point the engine was shut down and the fire suppression system activated. However, the fire did not extinguish, and the crew elected to ditch immediately into the nearby Ob River.

The An-24 came down at 11:56 near Strezhevoy, approximately 60 km (40 mi) south-east of Nizhnevartovsk. Due to the shallow water and the presence of undulations in the river bed, the aircraft was severely damaged in the ditching. Seven of the 37 people on board were killed. Nineteen people were treated for injuries.

== Aircraft ==
The accident aircraft was an Antonov An-24RV with registration RA-47302. Manufactured in 1975, at the time of the accident it was 36 years old and had accumulated over 48,000 flight hours. It was powered by two Ivchenko AI-24 turboprop engines.

== Investigation ==
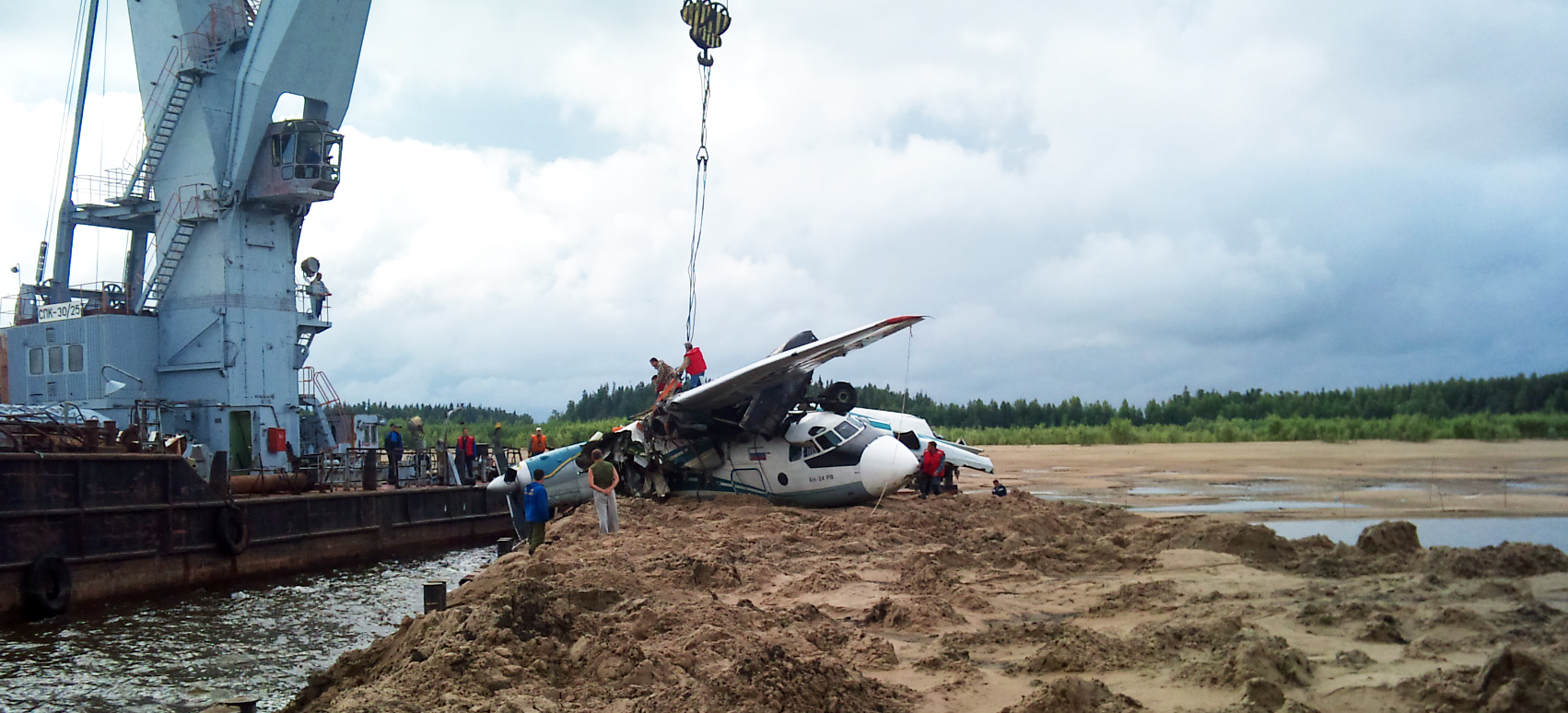
The wreckage of Flight 9007 being removed from the river bed

The Interstate Aviation Committee (IAC/МАК) of the Commonwealth of Independent States opened an investigation into the accident. Both the cockpit voice recorder and the flight data recorder were recovered and examined.

In August 2011, the West Siberian Transportation Prosecution Office announced that maintenance of the aircraft was found to be not compliant with Russian regulations, and that maintenance checks for the magnetic chip detector were noted in the aircraft's technical log but were never carried out. Two officials of Angara Airlines were charged.

In December 2013, the MAK released its final report. It found that the engine fire had originated with the failure of a support bearing of the compressor rotor, possibly due to a manufacturing defect or an incorrect reassembly of the engine after maintenance. The report also cited as contributing factor the captain's apparent reluctance to shut down the affected engine despite various abnormal indications, which allowed the fire to develop and become inextinguishable.
