= Flight 200 =

Flight 200 may refer to:

Listed chronologically

- Aeroflot Flight 200, a 1959 airliner accident in the Soviet Union
- Streamline Aviation Flight 200, involved in the 2000 Charles de Gaulle Airport runway collision
- Garuda Indonesia Flight 200, a 2007 airliner accident in Indonesia
- Angara Airlines Flight 200, a 2019 airliner accident in Russia

== See also ==
- No. 200 Flight RAAF, a Royal Australian Air Force special duties flight of World War II
