= Gagarin International Airport =

Gagarin International Airport can mean:

- Yuri Gagarin Airport, Angola
- Gagarinsky International Airport
