= Kirensk Airport =

Airport in Irkutsk Oblast, Russia

Kirensk Airport Аэропорт Киренск
- IATA: KCK; ICAO: UIKK

Summary
- Airport type: Public
- Location: Kirensk
- Elevation AMSL: 840 ft (260 m)
- Coordinates: 57°46′22″N 108°03′39″E

Map
- Location of the KCK airport

Runways
Direction	Length		Surface
Direction	ft	m	Surface
09/27	5,118	1,560	Asphalt

Kirensk Airport (Russian: Аэропорт Киренск) (IATA: KCK, ICAO: UIKK) is an airport in Irkutsk Oblast, Russia located 3 km west of Kirensk. It handles small transport aircraft. This airfield was part of the Yakutsk-Kirensk-Krasnoyarsk leg of the World War II Lend-Lease program Alaska-Siberian (ALSIB) air route. Angara Airlines serves scheduled flight to Irkutsk six times a week.

== See also ==
- List of airports in Russia
