= Strezhevoy Airport =

Airport in Russia

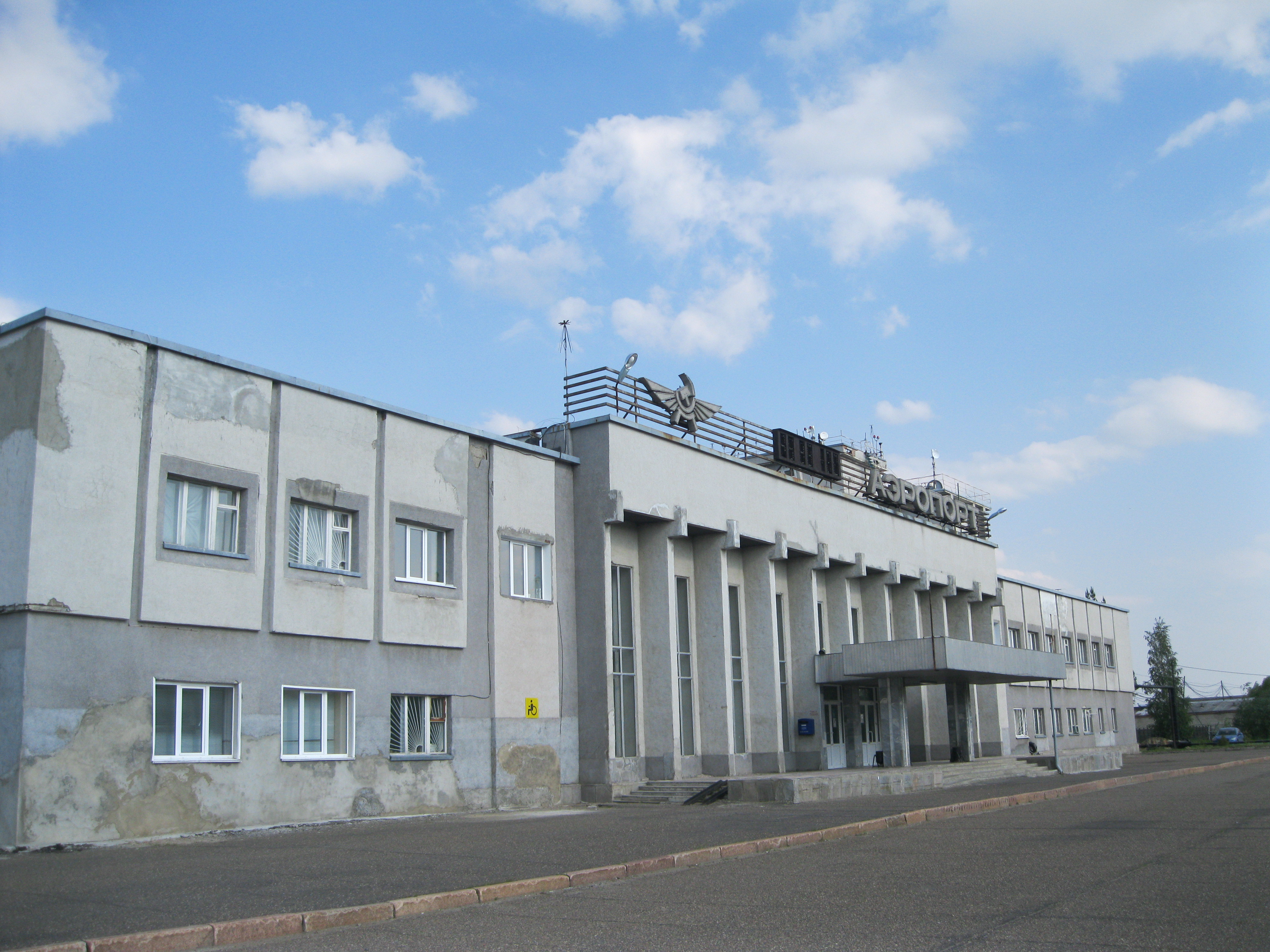
- IATA: SWT; ICAO: UNSS

Summary
- Location: Strezhevoy
- Elevation AMSL: 165 ft / 51 m
- Coordinates: 60°42′36″N 77°39′36″E
- Interactive map of Strezhevoy Airport

Runways
| Direction | Length | | Surface |
| Direction | ft | m | Surface |
|---|---|---|---|
| 16/34 | 6,555 | 1,998 | Concrete |

Strezhevoy Airport (also Strezhevoy Southeast Airport or Strezhovoy Airport) (IATA: SWT, ICAO: UNSS) is an airport in Russia located 4 km southeast of Strezhevoy. It contains a large tarmac laid out in a civilian use configuration, and services small transports. It was owned in 1970's during the development of oil fields in the north of Tomsk region.

== Airlines and destinations ==
| Airlines | Destinations |
|---|---|
| KrasAvia | Tomsk |
| Utair | Tomsk |

== See also ==
- List of airports in Russia
