= Tynda Airport =

Airport in Tynda, Russia

Tynda Sigikta Airport
- IATA: TYD; ICAO: UHBW; LID: ТЫД

Summary
- Airport type: Public
- Location: Tynda
- Elevation AMSL: 2,001 ft / 610 m
- Coordinates: 55°17′0″N 124°46′42″E
- Interactive map of Tynda Sigikta Airport

Runways
Direction	Length		Surface
Direction	ft	m	Surface
06/24	7,218	2,200	Concrete

Tynda Sigikta Airport (IATA: TYD, ICAO: UHBW) is an airport in Russia located 16 km north of Tynda. It is an intermediate class of airfield with several large buildings, probably capable of handling jet traffic.

== History ==
The airport started as a standalone runway built during the World War II years, where American planes which flown from Alaska stopped to refuel.

The airport opened in 1965 to the public. On October 26, 1974, regular flights from Komsomolsk-on-Amur over Chegdomyn to Tynda commenced. In 1974, 6,592 used the airport. From 1988 to 1992, the airport terminal was reconstructed to have a capacity of 100 people per hour, along with a ticket hall, snack bar, lounge with 500 seats, lounges, and meteorological services. the runway was then increased to 1923 meters.

In 2023, the terminal building was renovated. There are plans to extend the runway.

== Airlines and destinations ==
Airlines	Destinations
Aurora	Blagoveshchensk, Khabarovsk

== Accidents and incidents ==
On 24 July 2025, Angara Airlines Flight 2311, an Antonov An-24 arriving from Blagoveshchensk, crashed on approach to Tynda. All 48 people on board were killed.

== See also ==
- List of airports in Russia
