= 1991 Gulf of Finland Antonov An-24 crash =

1991 Antonov An-24 plane crash

- A Polet Airlines Antonov An-24 similar to the one involved.

Accident
- Date: 26 September 1991
- Summary: Crashed after takeoff for undetermined reason
- Site: Gulf of Finland, near Saint Petersburg, Russian SFSR

Aircraft
- Aircraft type: Antonov An-24
- Operator: Polet Airlines
- Registration: CCCP-46724
- Flight origin: Pulkovo Airport, Saint Petersburg, Russian SFSR
- Destination: Voronezh International Airport, Voronezh, Russian SFSR
- Occupants: 10
- Passengers: 7
- Crew: 3
- Fatalities: 10
- Survivors: 0

On 26 September 1991, an Antonov An-24 operated by Polet Airlines spiraled into the Gulf of Finland. The flight was a domestic cargo flight from Saint Petersburg to Voronezh with three crew members and seven passengers on board, all of which were killed in the crash.

== Background ==
=== Aircraft ===
The aircraft involved was an Antonov An-24 manufactured on May 31, 1963 and was delivered to the Ukrainian Civil Air Fleet Administration. In May 1980, it was given to NGO "Leninets". By May 29, 1991, it was being operated by Polet Airlines.

=== Crew members ===
- Captain: Vladimir Prokshits
- Co-pilot: Alexander Studenikin
- Flight mechanic: Stanislav Tinkov

== Accident ==
The plane took off from Pulkovo Airport at night. Reaching the altitude of 200 meters (656 feet), the crew began a right turn, climbing to 1,500 meters (4,920 feet). After turning right 90°, as they entered the Gulf of Finland, the plane suddenly shifted to the left. At an altitude of 860 meters (2,820 feet), the aircraft entered a deep dive and crashed into the water 150 meters from the shoreline on the southern outskirts of St. Petersburg. The accident occurred just five minutes after takeoff.

== Investigation ==
The investigation unable to conclude the cause of the crash. The most likely cause was that the pilot was disoriented in the night due to navigation failure as the engine were running accurately.
