= 2000 ASA Pesada Antonov An-24 crash =

Aviation accident

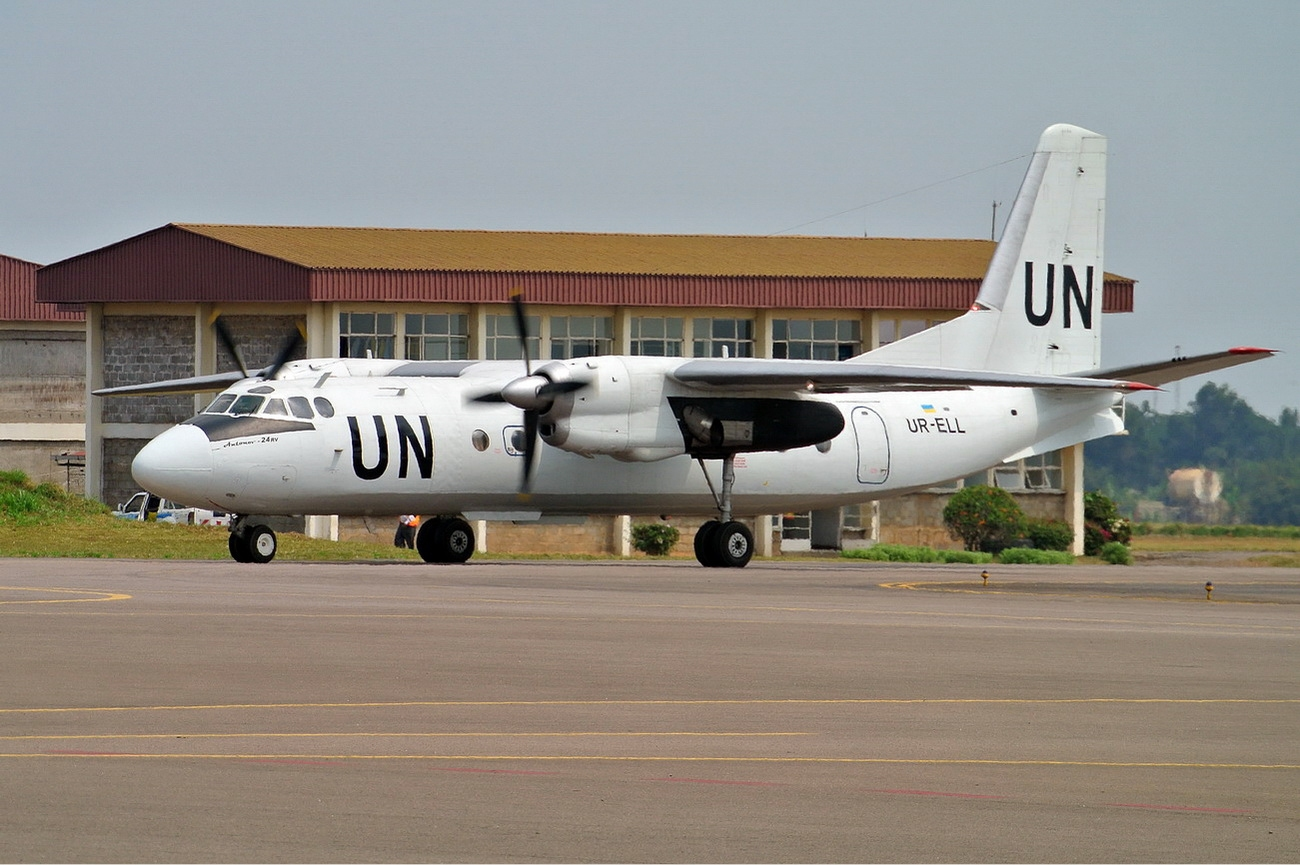
- An Antonov An-24 similar to the crashed aircraft

Accident
- Date: 15 November 2000
- Summary: Engine failure, loss of control
- Site: Near Quatro de Fevereiro Airport, Luanda, Angola; 8°53′38″S 13°12′55″E

Aircraft
- Aircraft type: Antonov An-24RV
- Operator: ASA Pesada
- Registration: D2-FCG
- Flight origin: Quatro de Fevereiro Airport, Luanda, Angola
- Destination: Namibe Airport, Namibe, Angola
- Occupants: 57
- Passengers: 52
- Crew: 5
- Fatalities: 57
- Survivors: 0

The 2000 ASA Pesada Antonov An-24 crash occurred on 15 November 2000 when an Antonov An-24 registered as D2-FCG operated by Angolan airline ASA Pesada crashed shortly after taking off from Quatro de Fevereiro Airport in Angola's capital Luanda. The aircraft was carrying 52 passengers and 5 crewmembers and was heading to Yuri Gagarin Airport in Namibe Province, Angola. All 57 people on board were killed in the crash.

The crash was the third deadliest plane crash in Angola, the second deadliest plane crash involving an Antonov An-24, and the second plane crash to occur in the country in just less than 3 weeks. On 31 October, another Antonov An-24 carrying 49 people operated by ACA-Ancargo Air crashed in the northern part of the country, killing all 49 people on board with UNITA rebels claiming to have shot down the plane.

== Flight ==
The aircraft took off from Luanda's Quatro de Fevereiro Airport to Namibe Airport, around 420 miles south from the capital. The aircraft was planning to pick up a Portuguese soccer team for a tour in the country. Shortly after takeoff, the aircraft then banked to the left and crashed onto a field in Golfe II district of Luanda. The aircraft exploded on impact. Search and rescue team did not find any survivors on the crash site. All 57 passengers and crews on board were killed. Authorities evacuated 40 badly burned bodies from the crash site, including women and children.

== Investigation ==
An investigation was opened on the crash. Many eyewitnesses stated that during the crash, the Antonov An-24 was on fire. The black boxes were recovered by investigators. Transport Minister Andre Luis Brandao stated that technical failure was the most likely cause of the crash. According to the findings of a preliminary investigation the accident was caused by engine failure; the report also accused ASA Pesada of negligence for failing to keep accurate records of the amount of fuel and number of passengers on board.

== Aftermath ==
Angolan authorities immediately grounded all Antonov An-24 in the country indefinitely due to the crash. Before the crash, Antonov aircraft had been prohibited to fly in the country as another Antonov had crashed in Angola on 31 October, which killed 49 people on the northern part of the country. Even though it was prohibited by the country, the Antonov were still permitted to fly on the coast. A statement by the National Civil Aviation Authority said none of the planes would now be allowed to fly on civilian services. The Angolan Air Force was exempted from the prohibition, but their planes cannot carry civilians.
