= Izhavia =

Russian airline

Izhavia Ижавиа
| IATA | ICAO | Call sign |
|---|---|---|
| I8 | IZA | IZHAVIA |
- Founded: 1992
- Ceased operations: 1 August 2026
- Hubs: Izhevsk Airport
- Fleet size: 8
- Destinations: 11
- Headquarters: Izhevsk, Udmurtia, Russia
- Key people: Alexander Sinelnikov (CEO) (resigned on 7 August 2026)
- Website: izhavia.su

JSC Izhavia (Russian: ОАО «Ижавиа», romanized: OAO «Ižavia») was an airline based in Izhevsk, Udmurtia, Russia. It was the national airline of the Udmurt Republic of Russia and operated domestic charter and scheduled passenger services. Its main base was Izhevsk Airport. The airline had been banned from flying into the EU. On August 1, 2026, Izhavia ceased all operations after its air operator's certificate was revoked by Rosaviatsia. The local government plans to sell the airline's shares to a private investor by the end of 2026 as part of a privatisation plan.

== History ==
The airline was formed in 1992 from the Aeroflot Izhevsk Division and was originally known as Izhevsk Air Enterprise.

On July 30, 2026, Rosaviatsia announced that it was revoking the airline's certificate. Flights scheduled after August 1 will be reallocated to the airlines S7 and Rossiya.

On August 1, 2026, Izhavia ceased all operations due to Russian authorities revoking its air operator's certificate, three months after inspections identified maintenance and crew scheduling violations.

== Destinations ==
As of September 2021, Izhavia flew to the following destinations as part of its scheduled services:

| Country | City | Airport | Notes | Refs |
|---|---|---|---|---|
| Armenia | Yerevan | Zvartnots International Airport | Terminated | |
| Azerbaijan | Baku | Heydar Aliyev International Airport | Terminated | |
Russia
| Russia | Anapa | Vityazevo Airport | Terminated | |
| Russia | Arkhangelsk | Vaskovo Airport | Terminated | |
| Russia | Chelyabinsk | Chelyabinsk Airport | | |
| Russia | Izhevsk | Izhevsk Airport | Hub | |
| Russia | Kirov | Kirov Airport | | |
| Russia | Krasnodar | Krasnodar Airport | Terminated | |
| Russia | Mineralnye Vody | Mineralnye Vody Airport | | |
| Russia | Moscow | Moscow Domodedovo Airport | | |
| Russia | Naryan-Mar | Naryan-Mar Airport | | |
| Russia | Nizhnekamsk/Naberezhnye Chelny | Begishevo Airport | Terminated | |
| Russia | Nizhnevartovsk | Nizhnevartovsk Airport | Terminated | |
| Russia | Perm | Bolshoye Savino Airport | | |
| Russia | Saint Petersburg | Pulkovo Airport | | |
| Russia | Saratov | Gagarin International Airport | | |
| Russia | Sochi | Adler-Sochi International Airport | | |
| Russia | Surgut | Surgut International Airport | | |
| Russia | Ufa | Ufa International Airport | | |
| Russia | Yekaterinburg | Koltsovo Airport | | |
| Russia / Ukraine (Note: Disputed. See Annexation of Crimea by the Russian Federation.) | Simferopol | Simferopol International Airport | Terminated | |
| Tajikistan | Khujand | Khujand Airport | Terminated | |

== Fleet ==
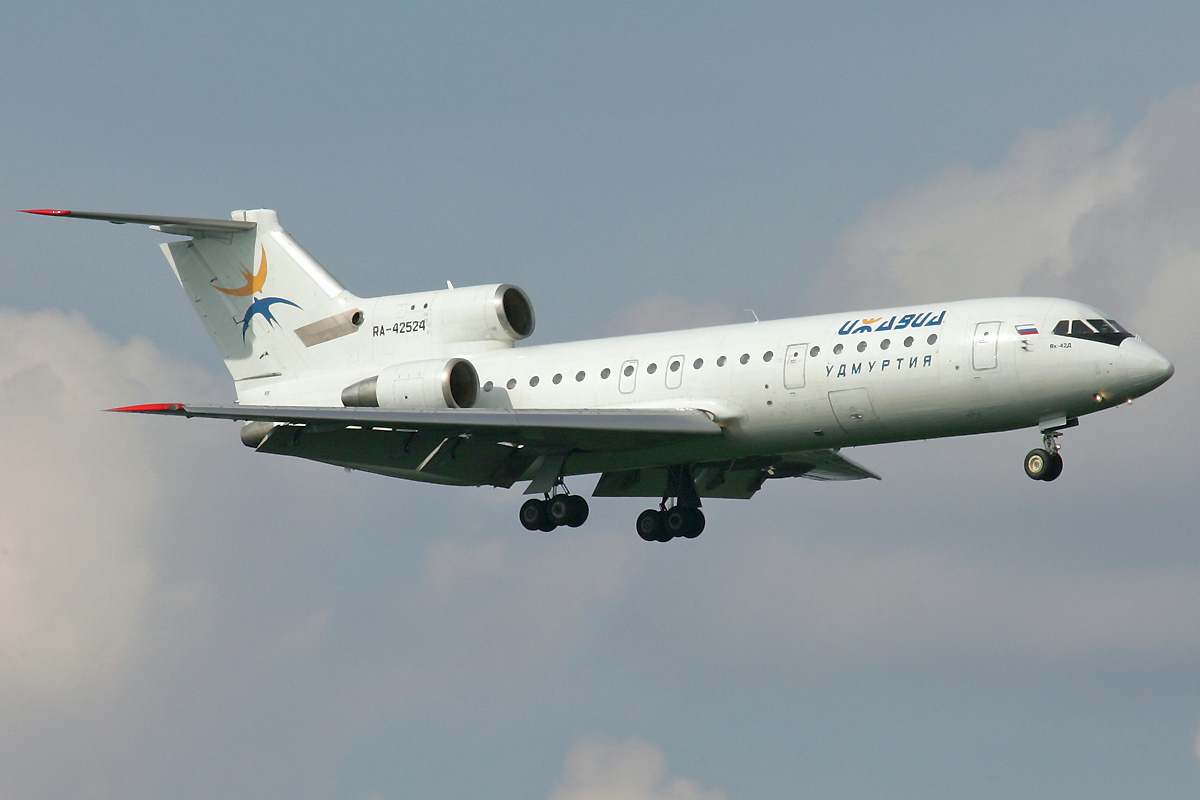
An Izhavia Yakovlev Yak-42D in 2009

=== Current fleet ===
As of August 2025, Izhavia operates the following aircraft:

| Aircraft | In fleet | Notes |
|---|---|---|
| Boeing 737-800 | 2 | |
| Yakovlev Yak-42D | 6 | |
| Total | 8 | |

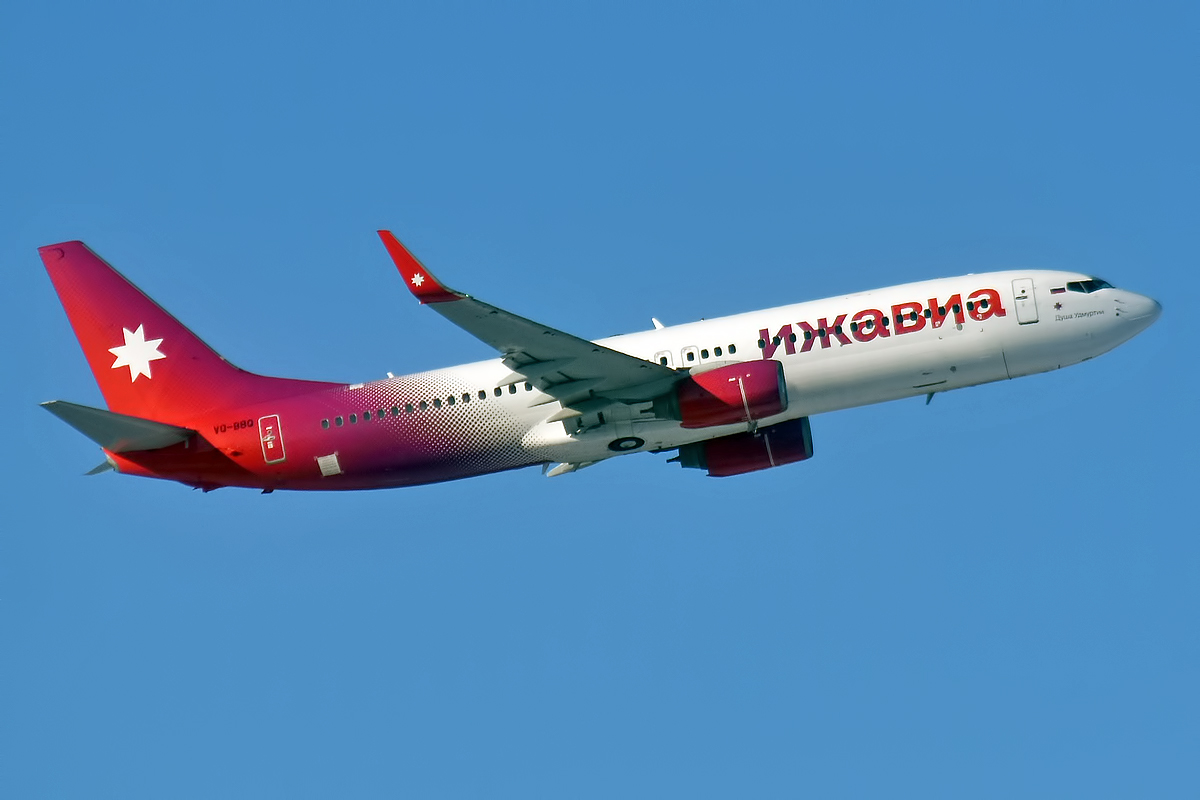
An Izhavia Boeing 737-800

=== Former fleet ===
The airline previously operated the following equipment:

- Antonov An-24B
- Antonov An-26
- Antonov An-26B
- Tupolev Tu-134A
- 1 Yakovlev Yak-42
