= Vidin Airfield =

Airport in Vidin, Bulgaria

Vidin Airport; Inovo Airport Летище Видин; Летище Иново
- IATA: VID; ICAO: LBVD

Summary
- Airport type: Public
- Owner: State-owned
- Operator: Ministry of Transport
- Serves: Vidin
- Location: Inovo, Vidin Municipality, Bulgaria
- Opened: 1973
- Closed: 1999, air traffic suspended by the Ministry of Transport
- Hub for: Balkan Bulgarian Airlines
- Elevation AMSL: 200 ft / 61 m
- Coordinates: 44°01′20″N 022°48′57″E
- Interactive map of Vidin Airport; Inovo Airport

Runways
Direction	Length		Surface
Direction	m	ft	Surface
09/27	2,080	6,824	Concrete

Vidin Airfield, also known as Vidin Airport or Inovo Airport (Bulgarian: Летище Видин / Аерогара Видин, romanized: Letishte Vidin / Aerogara Vidin; Bulgarian: Летище Иново, romanized: Letishte Inovo) (IATA: VID, ICAO: LBVD) was a civil regional airport located in Northwest Bulgaria, in the territory of the village of Inovo, Vidin Municipality, 4 km from the city of Vidin. It operated as a regional passenger airport since 1973, and since 1999 it has been closed to air traffic.

There are plans to rebuild and restore the activity of the airport. It is one of the transport infrastructure projects included in the interactive map published by the Ministry of Regional Development and Public Works. The map presents the state's plans for projects that will be implemented in the country's planning areas, as for the Vidin airport, the government's deadline is 2025. The location of the Vidin airport is unique. It can serve not only the large area around the city, but also the neighbouring areas of Romania and Serbia.

== Description ==
The area of the airport abuts the southwestern edge of Inovo village, which is 4 kilometres northwest of Vidin and the European route E79 road. It occupies an area of 153,841 square meters. It includes:

- One concrete runway (with two exits) in good condition, length 2080 m, width 38 m, runway area of 101,134 sq. m in total;
- Five buildings in poor condition – airport terminal (463 sq.m.), maintenance and repair building (467 sq.m.), other building (51 sq.m.), pavilion (86 sq.m.), sanitary facility (29 sq. m).

== History ==
Construction of Vidin airport began in 1972 and operated as a civil airport from 1973. Balkan Bulgarian Airlines operated from the airport with Antonov An-24 passenger aircraft on the following two air routes:

- year-round, daily: Vidin – Sofia (approx. 30 minutes) and vice versa;
- seasonal, weekly: Vidin – Varna – Burgas (approx. 1.5 hours) and vice versa.

Vidin Airport served an average of about 40,000 passengers per year. It was popular for serving domestic scheduled passenger services between northwest Bulgaria and the capital of Sofia and direct flights to the Black Sea region. In 1991, due to the economic crisis and reforms in Bulgaria (Bulgaria's transition to democracy and a market economy), scheduled state-run airline routes became unprofitable and were closed, but the airport continued to serve medical and private aircraft and helicopters. It was shut down without much thought in 1998-1999 due to a land compensation dispute between the Ministry of Transport and the Ministry of Agriculture as to which of them should compensate the former landowners in the area when agricultural land was nationalized during Bulgaria's socialist era.

Air traffic was suspended and closed in 1999 by the order of the Minister of Transport, and the airport was given to the management of the regional governor of Vidin Province. It is rarely used, for services outside of aviation – occasionally drag racing competitions, etc. After investors' interest had been shown, local authorities (municipal and regional) are making efforts to revive the airport through a concession of this inactive airport.

== Hijacking incident ==
The third case of a plane hijacking in Bulgaria occurred on 18 June 1977, when an Antonov An-24 aircraft of Balkan Bulgarian Airlines, flying from Vidin to Sofia with a crew of four and 44 passengers on board, made a forced landing in Belgrade. After 7 minutes into the flight, Rumen Tsankov Dimitrov–the son of a high-ranking Ministry of Interior official, who had a previous conviction for theft and was a registered psychopath, got up from his seat and aimed a gun (his father's official TT pistol) at the head of the flight attendant, and asked for a connection with the flight crew. To prove that the weapon was genuine and to frighten the passengers, he fired a shot to the starboard side, declaring that the hijackers were a whole group. Dimitrov asked for the plane to land in London subsequently Munich. Following the instructions given to Dimitrov from the ground, the commander explained that there was not enough fuel and the plane landed in Belgrade (Serbia, Yugoslavia), where Dimitrov was neutralized by the authorities.
