= Izhevsk Airport =

Airport in Izevsk, Russia

Mikhail Timofeevich Kalashnikov Izhevsk International Airport
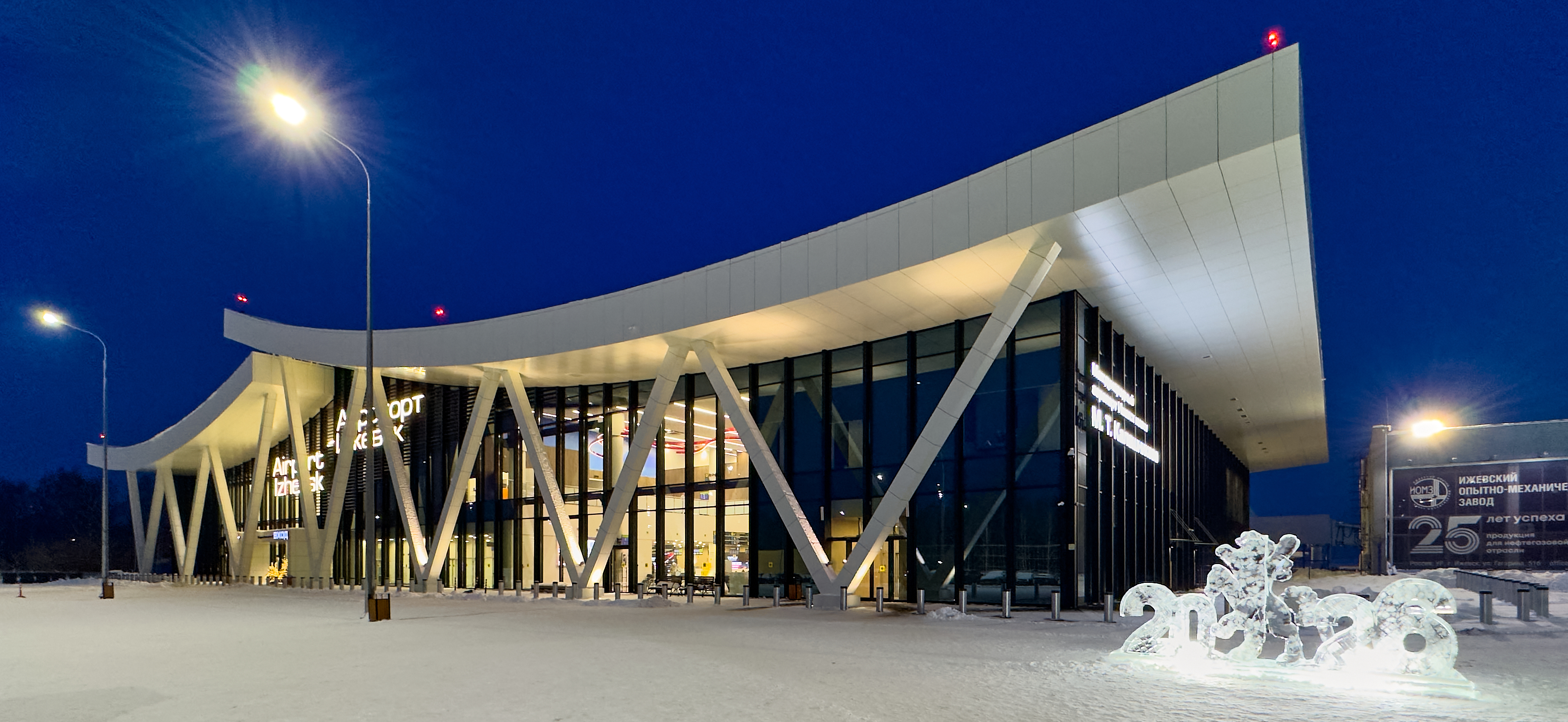
- IATA: IJK; ICAO: USII; LID: ИЖВ

Summary
- Airport type: Public
- Operator: Izhavia
- Serves: Izevsk
- Location: Izhevsk, Russia
- Opened: 1974
- Elevation AMSL: 535 ft (163 m)
- Coordinates: 56°50′0″N 53°27′24″E

Map
- Location of the airport in Udmurtia Location of the airport in Russia Location of the airport in Europe

Runways
Direction	Length		Surface
Direction	ft	m	Surface
01/19	8,202	2,500	Concrete

Mikhail Timofeevich Kalashnikov Izhevsk International Airport (Note: Currently no international flights take place from Izhevsk, but the airport has the status of an international airport of federal significance.)(Udmurt: Ижевск Аэропорт, Russian: Международный аэропорт Иже́вск имени М. Т. Калашникова) (IATA: IJK, ICAO: USII) is an airport in Udmurtia, Russia, located 15 km east of Izhevsk. It handles small airliners. The airport serves several domestic destinations, as well as cargo flights.

== History ==
On 26 August 2022, construction began on a new terminal with the ability to accommodate both domestic and potential international flights, and to accommodate increasing demand. A first for the airport, the terminal will be equipped with three jetways.

In 2023, the airport was officially granted status as an international airport of federal significance.

On 20 September 2025, the new terminal was opened, allowing the operation of both domestic and potentially international flights. The design of the terminal incorporates design features based on traditional Udmurt culture. The new terminal is capable of handling up to 400 passengers per hour, twice of the old terminal. The airport contains multilingual signage in Udmurt, Russian, Chinese and English.

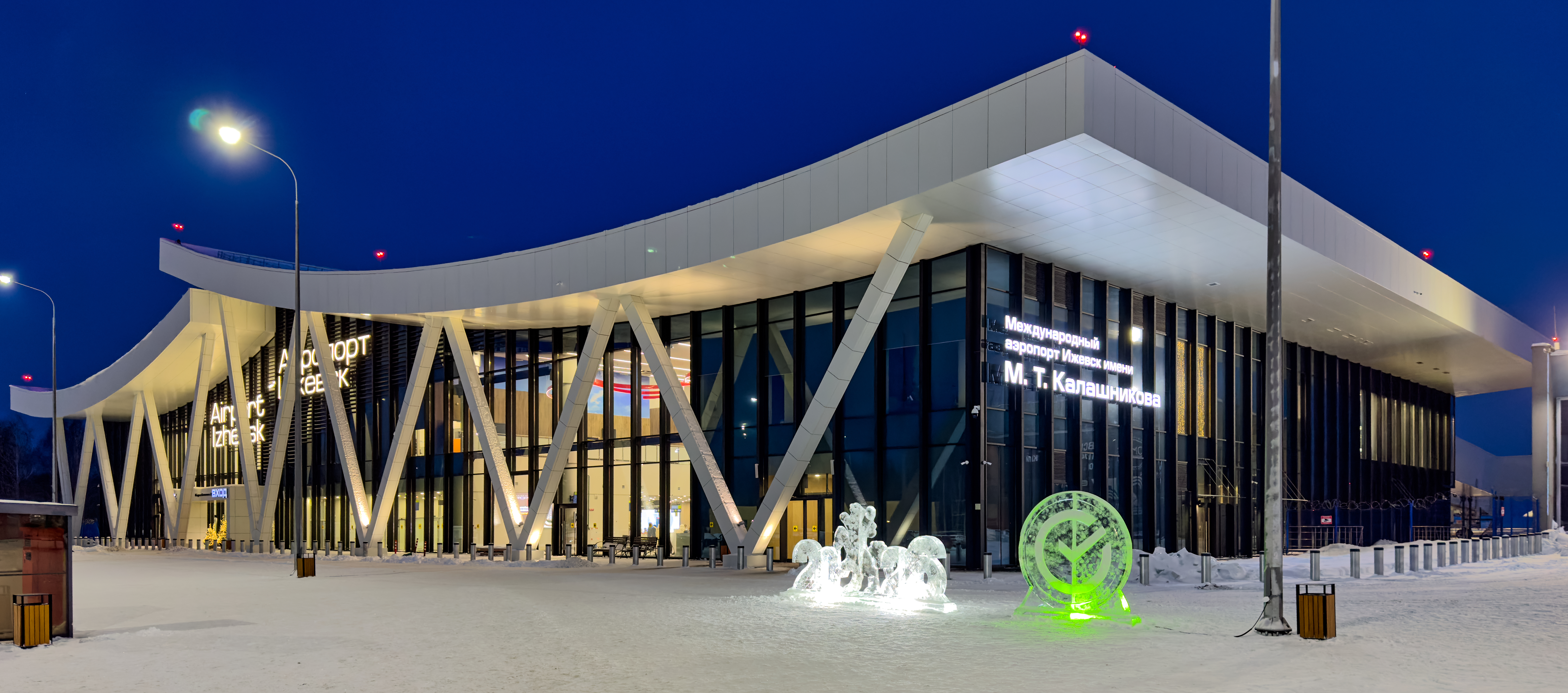
New terminal

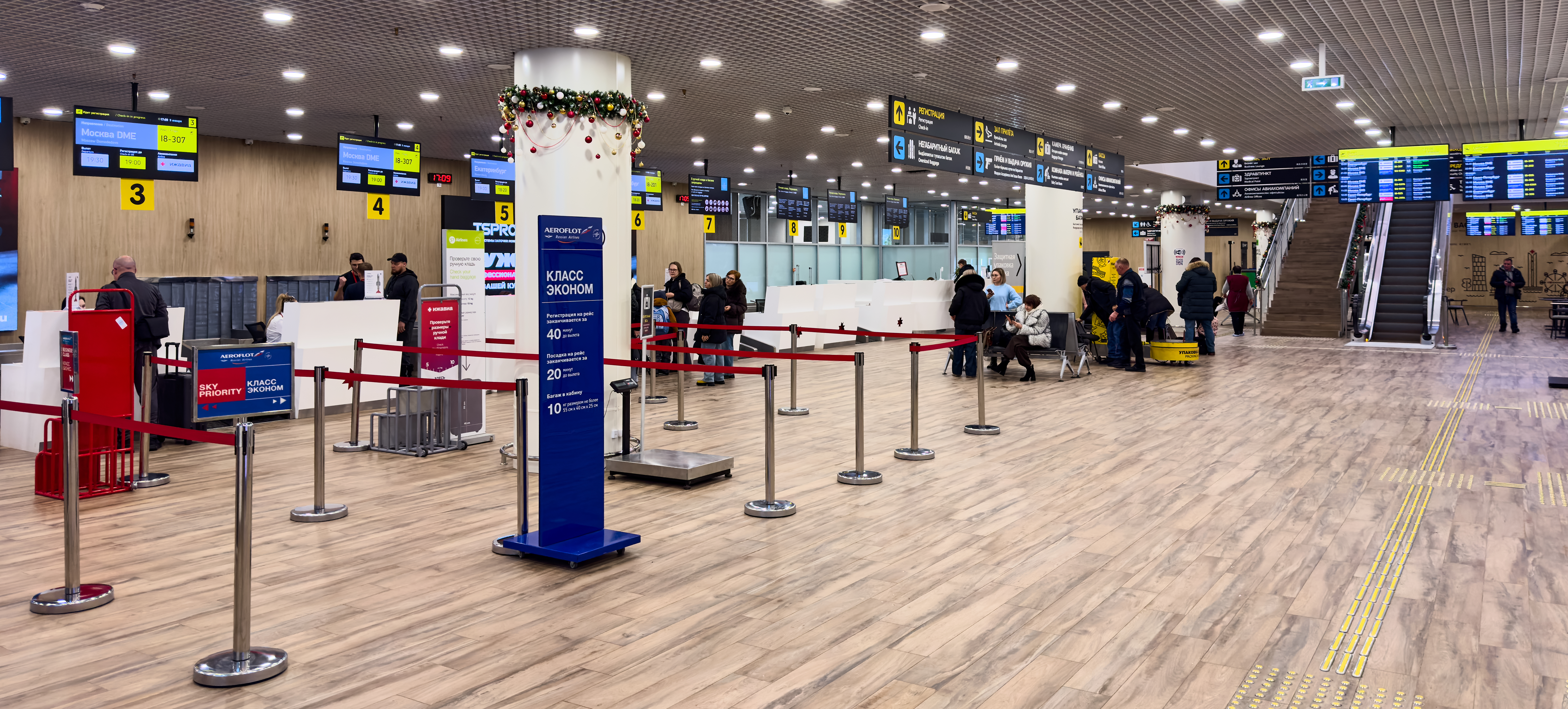
Check-in

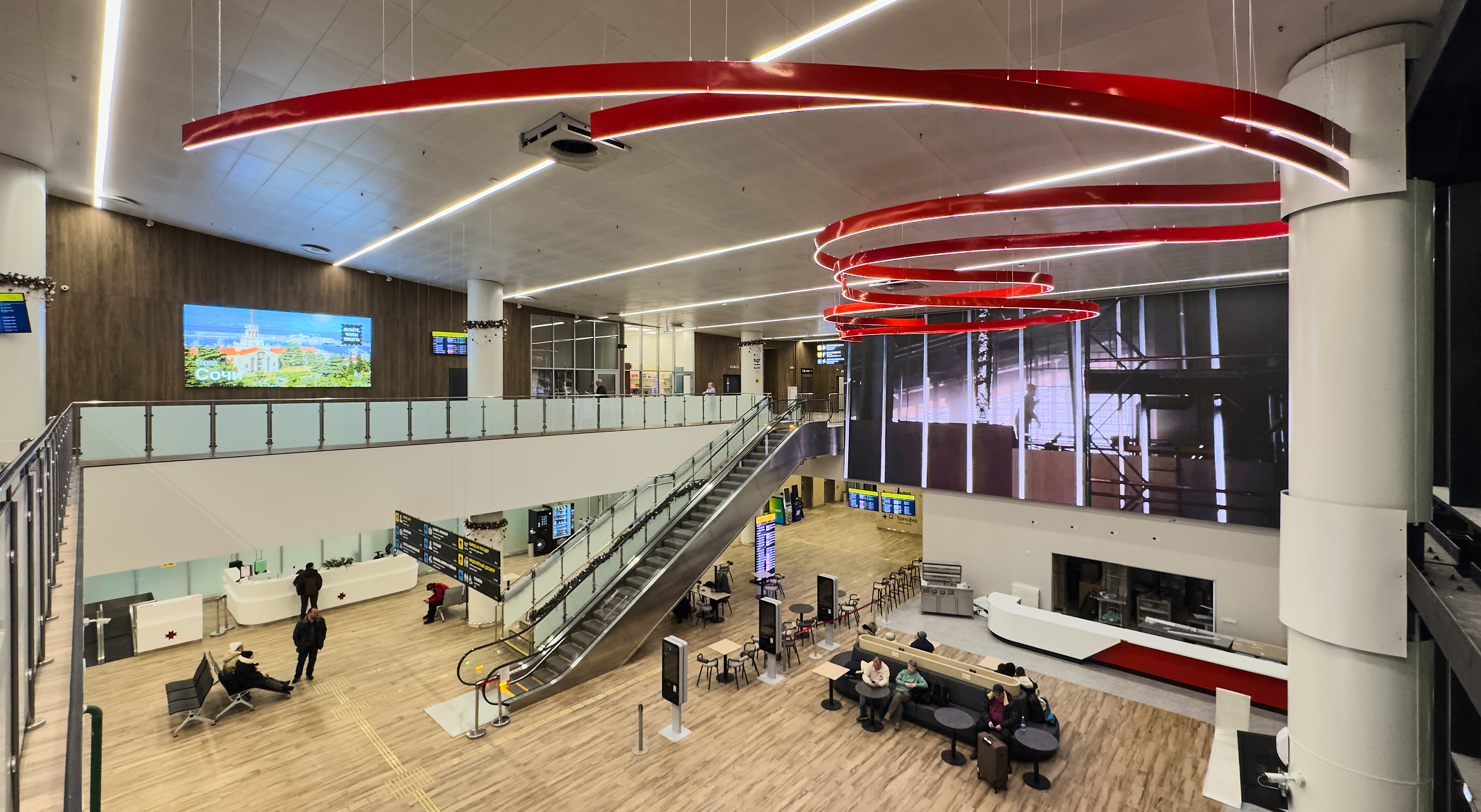
Concourse

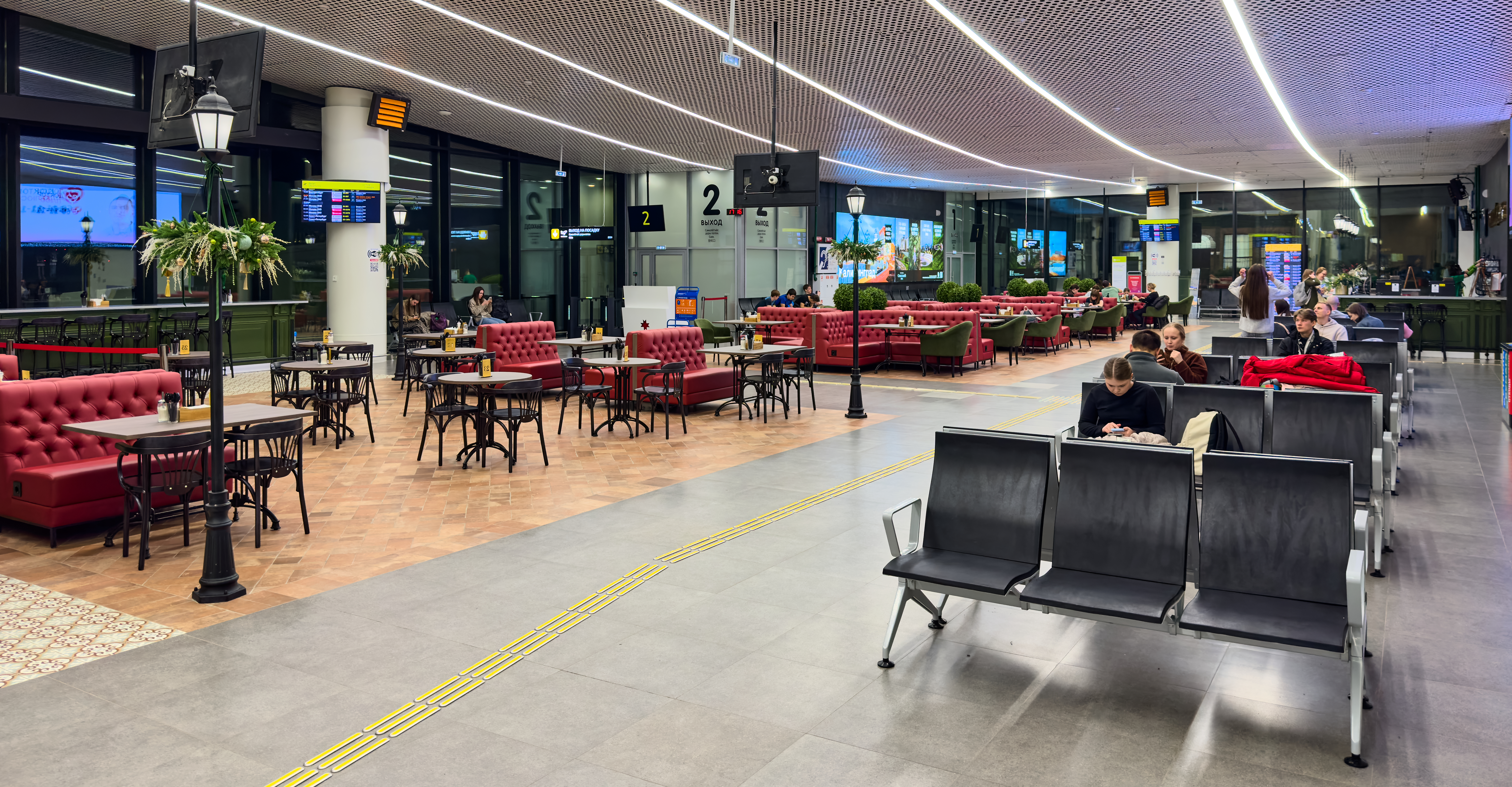
Gates

On 14 November 2025, by a Decree of the President of Russia, the airport was named after the legendary firearms designer and resident of Izhevsk, Mikhail Kalashnikov.

== Airlines and destinations ==
Airlines	Destinations
Aeroflot	Moscow–Sheremetyevo, Sochi
Ikar	Kaliningrad, Saint Petersburg; Seasonal: Makhachkala
Pobeda	Saint Petersburg
Red Wings Airlines	Yekaterinburg
Rossiya Airlines	Moscow–Sheremetyevo, Sochi
S7 Airlines	Moscow-Domodedovo, Novosibirsk

== See also ==
- List of the busiest airports in Russia
- List of the busiest airports in Europe
- List of the busiest airports in the former USSR
