= Angara Airlines Flight 200 =

2019 aviation accident in Russia

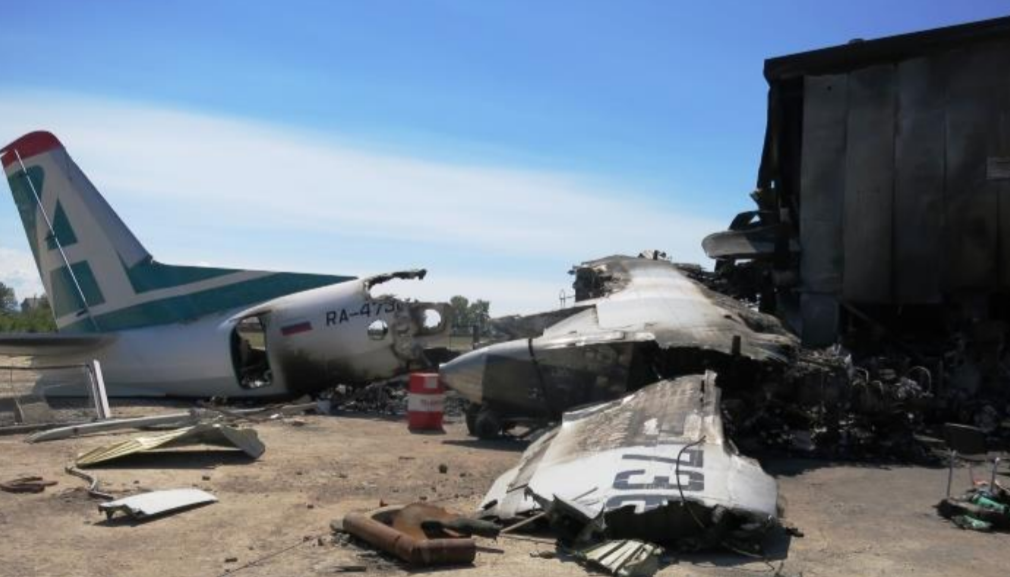
- Wreckage of the aircraft

Accident
- Date: 27 June 2019
- Summary: Runway excursion
- Site: Nizhneangarsk Airport, Russia

Aircraft
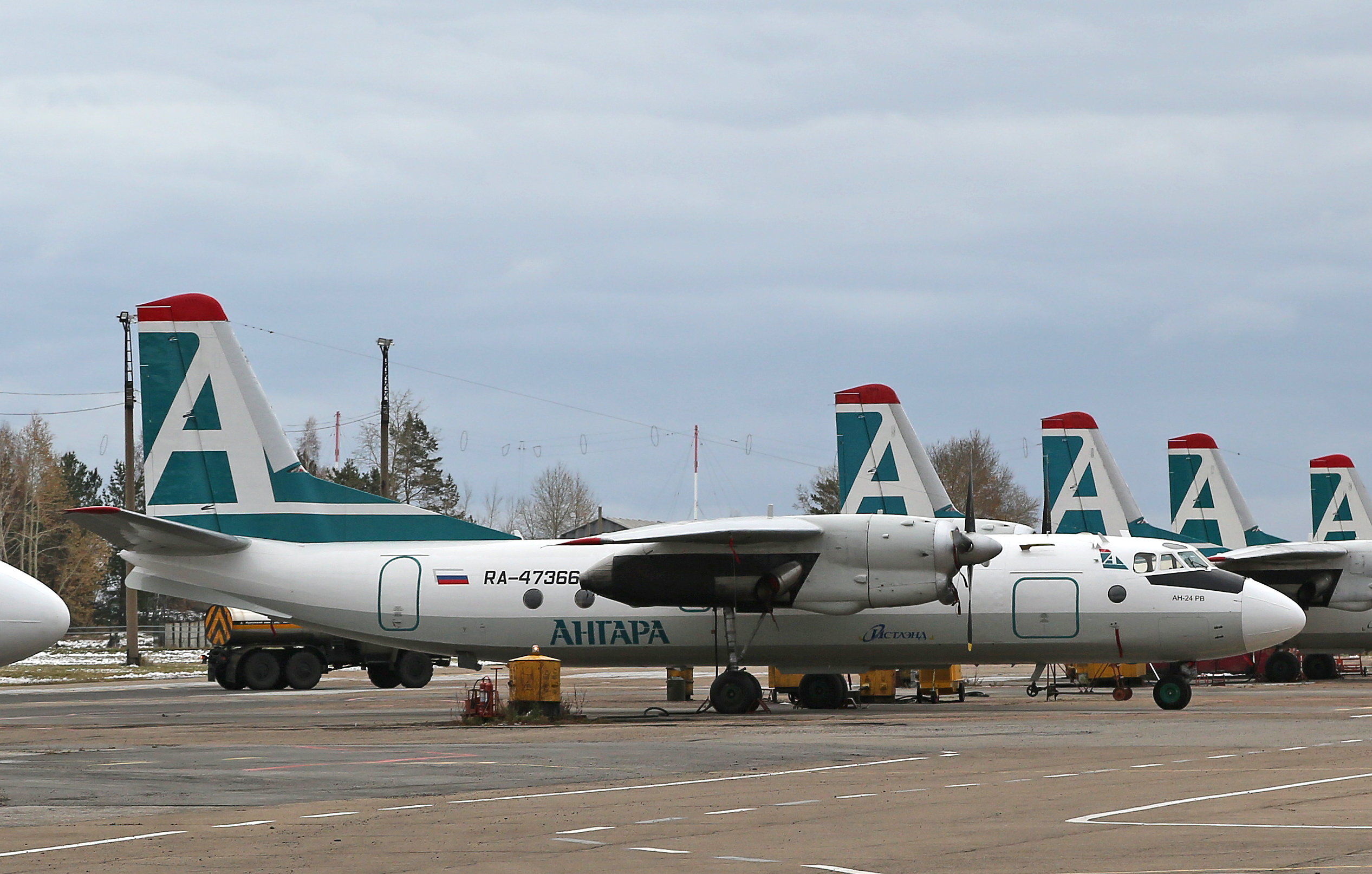
- RA-47366, the aircraft involved in the accident, seen in 2018
- Aircraft type: Antonov An-24RV
- Operator: Angara Airlines
- IATA flight No.: 2G200
- ICAO flight No.: AGU200
- Call sign: SARMA 200
- Registration: RA-47366
- Flight origin: Ulan-Ude Airport, Ulan-Ude, Russia
- Destination: Nizhneangarsk Airport, Nizhneangarsk, Russia
- Occupants: 47
- Passengers: 43
- Crew: 4
- Fatalities: 2
- Injuries: 22
- Survivors: 45

Angara Airlines Flight 200 was a domestic scheduled flight from Ulan-Ude Airport to Nizhneangarsk Airport, Russia. On 27 June 2019, the Antonov An-24RV aircraft operating the flight suffered an engine failure on take-off. On landing at Nizhneangarsk, the aircraft departed the runway and collided with a building. The captain and flight engineer were killed. Many of the 43 passengers sustained injuries.

== Aircraft and crew ==
The accident aircraft was an Antonov An-24RV, registration RA-47366, msn 77310804 and was produced on September 16, 1977 therefore the aircraft was 47 years old at the time of the accident. On April 7, 1978, it was transferred to Aeroflot; in 1991, it was transferred to Sakhalin Production Association, which on December 22, 1993 was renamed Sakhalin Air Routes (SAT). On April 23, 2013, it was transferred to Angara Airlines. On the day of the crash, it had completed 18,584 takeoff-landing cycles and flown 38,014 flight hours.

The plane was piloted by 58-year-old Captain Vladimir Ilyich Kolomin. He worked for Angara Airlines for 13 years and 8 months (since September 2005). Before becoming captain of Antonov An-24 in September 2008, he worked on An-24s as First officer. He has flown 15,167 hours, 10,667 of which were on the An-24 (3,468 of which were as PIC). He was also an An-2 pilot.

The first officer was 42-year-old Sergey Aleksandrovich Sazonov. He worked for Angara Airlines for 7 years and 1 month (since May 2012). He had been the second pilot of the An-24 since October 2016. He has flown 6,012 hours, 1,325 of which were on the An-24. He also flew An-2 and L-410 aircraft.

The flight engineer was 57-year-old Oleg Vladimirovich Bardanov. He worked for Angara Airlines for 9 years and 8 months (from October 2008 to March 2011 and from June 2013). As a flight engineer on the An-24 since October 1989. He flew 12,853 hours, 7,149 of which on the An-24. As a flight engineer, he also flew on Il-76 and Tu-154 aircraft.

The stewardess was 40-year-old Elena Viktorovna Laputskaya. She worked for Angara Airlines for 13 years and 8 months (since September 2005). She had flown 10,373 hours, 5,457 of which were on the An-24.

== Incident ==
Moments of the crash
- Footage taken by passenger during the crash on YouTube
- CCTV of the crash on YouTube

According to the schedule, the departure on the route Ulan-Ude-Nizhneangarsk was planned for 04:50 UTC on June 26, 2019, but due to weather conditions at Nizhneangarsk Airport (which were worse than the minimum), the departure of flight 200 was initially postponed every hour, and then postponed to 00:30 UTC on June 27, 2019. Before the flight, the crew rested at the Polet Hotel, located close to the airport.

At 01:03 UTC, flight 200 departed from Ulan-Ude; the PIC (pilot in command) performed takeoff. At 02:08 UTC, the crew reported the start of the descent and requested landing on a heading of 45°. The air traffic controller cleared the flight to approach runway 23 (magnetic landing heading 225°). At 02:11 UTC, engine number 1 (left) failed during the descent, the crew performed actions to feather the propeller, turned off the autopilot and reported to the control tower controller. In response to the control tower controller's request for a decision on landing, the PIC replied: We will land, approach .

After landing, the airplane unexpectedly veered to the right, left the runway, ran along the ground, broke through the airport fence, crashed into a sewage treatment plant building and stopped. Upon impact with the building, the plane was half-destroyed and caught fire.

== Investigation ==
The Interstate Aviation Committee (MAK) opened an investigation into the accident. A separate criminal investigation was also opened.

According to the interim report it was determined that while descending to 10,000 feet (3,000 m) approximately 34 nautical miles (63 km) from the airport, the left engine failed due to reduced oil pressure. The captain took control of the aircraft, disengaged the autopilot, and verified the engine's automatic feathering. The aircraft continued its approach and landed on runway 23, but began to deviate to the right after touchdown, veered off the runway, crossed the airport fence, collided with a building, and caught fire. The flight attendant evacuated the passengers through the rear exits. The first officer was unable to save the captain and flight engineer, who were trapped and showed no signs of life. The first officer exited through the left front emergency hatch.

At the same time, the IAC confirmed that because the captain of the crew became ill before the flight, the airline replaced him with an inspector pilot. The IAC also recommended that airlines conduct a one-time check of the technical condition and operability of the brake systems in accordance with the maintenance regulations on An-24 and An-26 aircraft. The committee also recommended that flight crews additionally study the process of approaching and landing with one failed engine on An-24 aircraft.
