= Tomsk Kamov Airport =

Airport in Russia

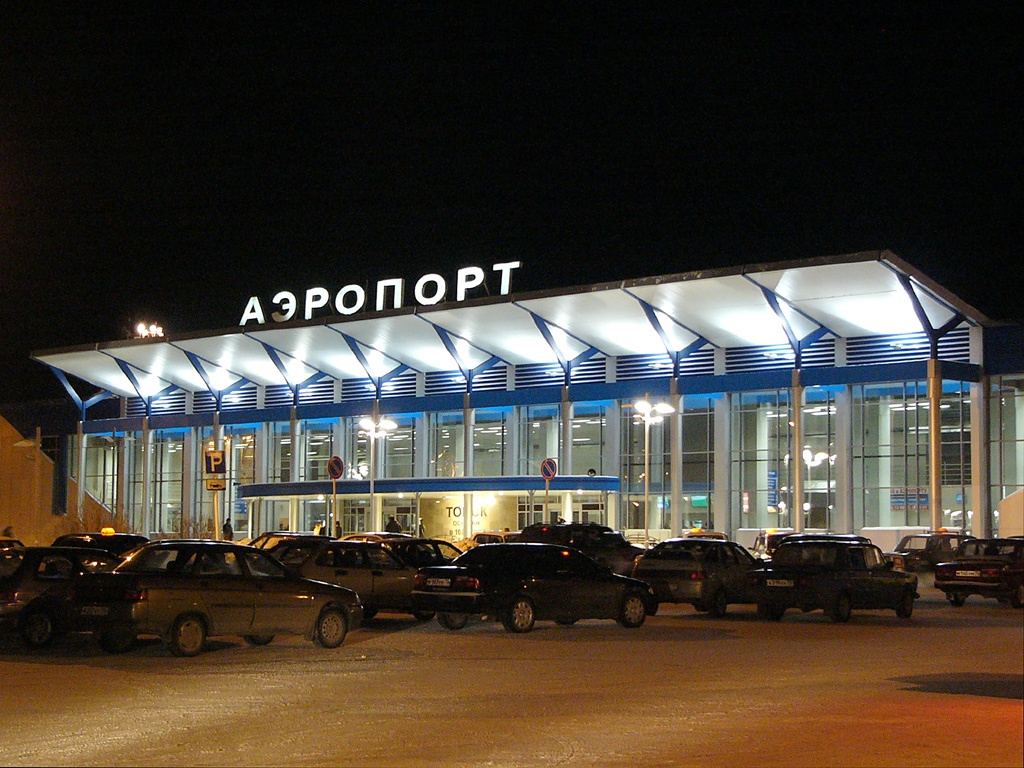
- IATA: TOF; ICAO: UNTT

Summary
- Airport type: Public
- Serves: Tomsk, Tomsk Oblast, Russia
- Location: Bogashevo
- Elevation AMSL: 182 m (597 ft)
- Coordinates: 56°23′12″N 85°12′38″E
- Website: tomskairport.ru

Maps
- Tomsk in Russia

- Location of the airport in the Tomsk oblast

Runways
Direction	Length		Surface
Direction	m	ft	Surface
03/21	2,500	8,202	Asphalt

Statistics
- Passengers: 628,932 ▲
- Cargo (tonnes): 2,316 ▲
- Source: Web site

Tomsk Kamov Airport (Russian: Аэропорт Томск Камов) (IATA: TOF, ICAO: UNTT) is an airport that serves Tomsk, Russia. It is located approximately 20 km south-east of Tomsk city center, near the village of Bogashevo in Tomsky District of Tomsk Oblast. In 2018 airport was renamed to commemorate Nikolai Kamov – the aircraft engineer, founder of the Soviet helicopter industry.

== History ==
The airport opened in November 1967 and replaced another airport within the Kashtak district in the city of Tomsk. The Kashtak site was rebuilt with multistory apartment buildings and turned into a bedroom community of Tomsk.

In 2004 and 2005, the passenger terminal and the open space in front of the airport were reconstructed at a cost of 70 million roubles.

Construction of a new runway and facilities for flights to Central Asia began in 2006. The construction budget for 2006 totaled 120 million roubles.

In the fall of 2006, construction began on a new road connecting Bogashevo to the Akademgorodok scientific research district.

In 2020, Russian politician and government critic Alexei Navalny fell ill after drinking tea in the airport cafe. He was scheduled to fly home to Moscow. It is believed the cup of tea was poisoned and he fell unconscious, with the plane diverting to Omsk instead.

In 2021, a 2.5 billion ruble contract was signed for the construction of a new domestic passenger terminal, scheduled to be completed by March 2023.

In 2019, passenger traffic totaled 750 thousand people, with traffic expecting to double by 2025.

== Airlines and destinations ==
Airlines	Destinations
Aeroflot	Moscow–Sheremetyevo
Azur Air	Seasonal charter: Nha Trang, Phuket, Pattaya
KrasAvia	Krasnoyarsk–International, Strezhevoy
Nordwind Airlines	Kazan, Saint Petersburg, Sochi
Red Wings Airlines	Yekaterinburg
Rossiya Airlines	Seasonal: Sochi
RusLine	Nizhnevartovsk, Yekaterinburg
S7 Airlines	Moscow–Domodedovo, Novosibirsk
Utair	Irkutsk, Strezhevoy, Surgut, Tyumen
UVT Aero	Kazan
VietJet Air	Seasonal charter: Nha Trang

== Accidents ==
On 16 July 2021, on SiLA Airlines Flight 42, a failure of both engines of the turboprop plane An-28 occurred while en route from Kedrovy to Tomsk. At an emergency landing in a swamp, the plane was severely damaged — but all the passengers and crew members survived with minimal injures.

== See also ==
- Kemerovo Airport
- List of airports in Russia
