= Gorno-Chuysky =

Gorno-Chuysky Горно-Чуйский
- Urban-type settlement
- Interactive map of Gorno-Chuysky
- Location of Gorno-Chuysky Gorno-Chuysky (Irkutsk Oblast)
- Coordinates: 57.6432°N 111.7565°E
- Country: Russia
- Federal subject: Irkutsk Oblast
- Administrative district: Mamsko-Chuysky District
- Elevation: 224 m (735 ft)

Population (2010 Census)
  - Total: 276
  - Estimate (2020): 0 (−100%)
- Time zone: UTC+8 (MSK+5)
- Postal code: 666821
- OKTMO ID: 25624160051

Gorno-Chuysky (Russian: Горно-Чуйский) is an urban locality (an urban-type settlement) in Mamsko-Chuysky District of Irkutsk Oblast, Russia. Population: 276 (2010 census); 621 (2002 census); 2,114 (1989 Soviet census).

== Geography ==
It is located in the North Baikal Highlands, on the right bank of the Chuya River, 150 km (93 mi) southwest of the working village of Mama.

== History ==
Gorno-Chuysky had had over 4,000 inhabitants in 1970, but lost population following the collapse of the USSR and only a residual population remained. Finally it was abolished in 2019.
