= North Baikal Highlands =

Mountainous area in Russia

- Северо-Байкальское нагорье / Хойто-Байгалай хадалиг газар
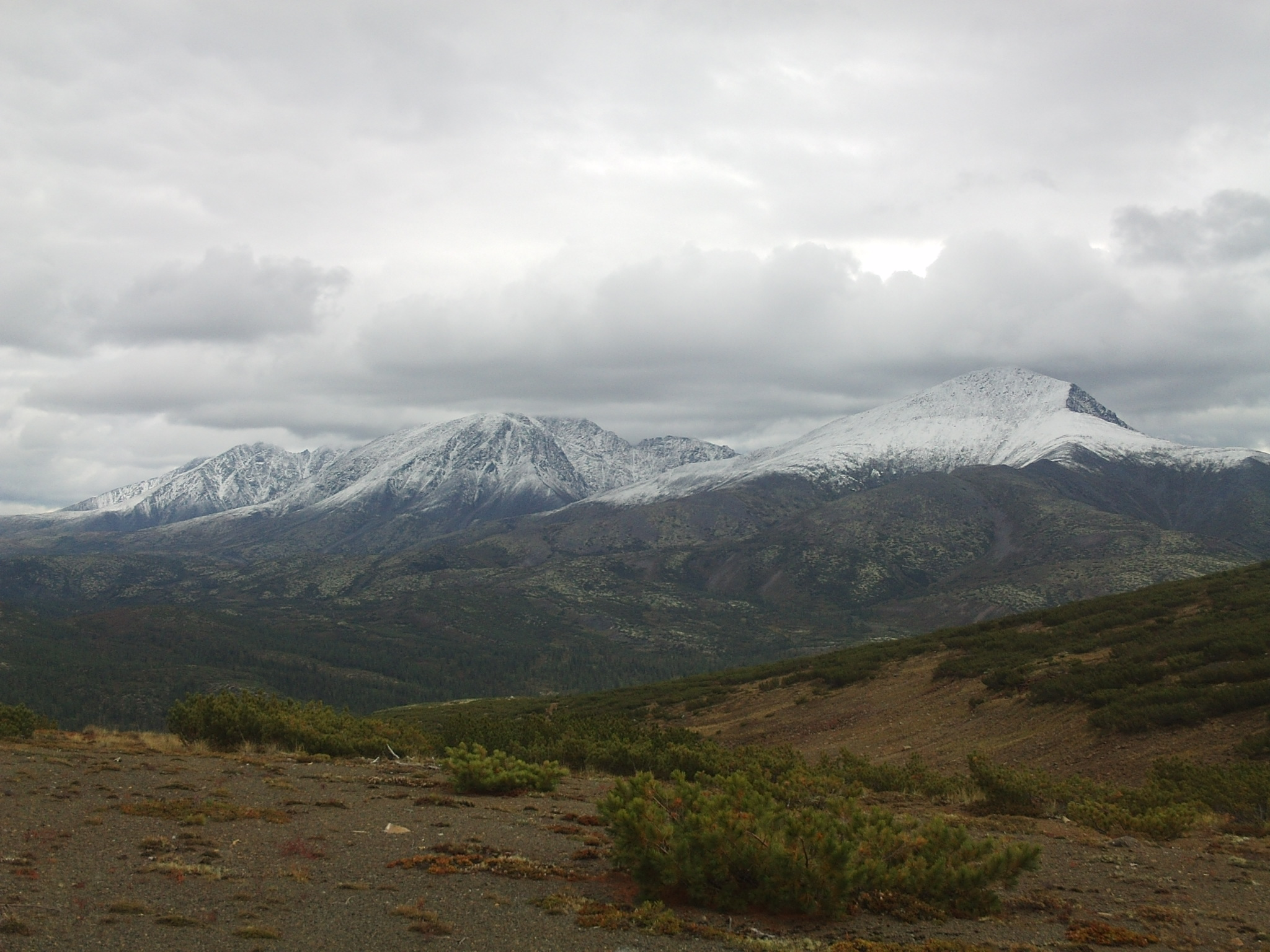
- View of the highest area of the highlands

Highest point
- Peak: Inyaptuk Golets
- Elevation: 2,514 m (8,248 ft)
- Coordinates: 56°24′14″N 111°5′7″E

Dimensions
- Length: 400 km (250 mi)
- Width: 150 km (93 mi)

Geography
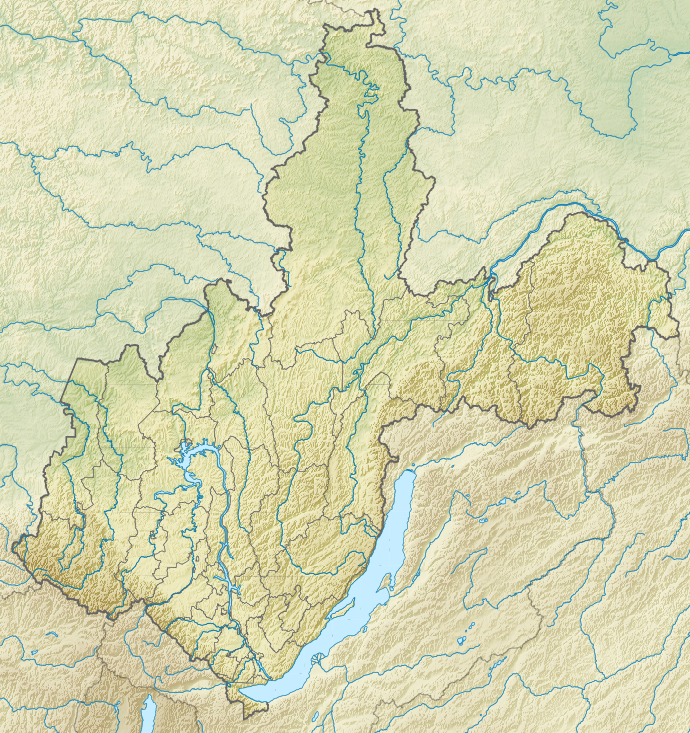
- Location within Republic of Buryatia Location within Irkutsk Oblast
- Country: Russia
- Federal subject: Irkutsk Oblast/ Buryatia
- Range coordinates: 57°0′N 111°0′E
- Parent range: South Siberian System

Geology
- Orogeny: Alpine orogeny
- Rock ages: Early Proterozoic and Late Riphean
- Rock type(s): Metamorphic rocks, granite intrusions

Climbing
- Easiest route: From Mama

The North Baikal Highlands (Russian: Северо-Байкальское нагорье; Buryat: Хойто-Байгалай хадалиг газар) are a mountainous area in Eastern Siberia, Russia. Administratively the territory of the uplands is part of Buryatia and Irkutsk Oblast.

The nearest airport is Mama Airport.

== History ==
Between 1855 and 1858 Ivan Kryzhin (d. 1884) took part in the Eastern Siberian expedition led by Russian astronomer and traveler Ludwig Schwarz. In 1857 he mapped the Kirenga River and, while exploring its right tributary, the Cherepanikha, Kryzhin discovered the formerly unknown Akitkan Range rising above the area of its source.

Between 1909 and 1911 the North Baikal Highlands were explored by Russian geologist Pavel Preobrazhensky (1874 - 1944). He surveyed the river valleys of the area, all of them tributaries of the Lena basin, including the Chechuy, Chaya, the Chuya, Kirenga and its right tributaries, as well as the Mama.

Preobrazhensky's trip very nearly ended in tragedy when his boat crashed and capsized while navigating down the Chaya River. Badly injured and shaken, Pavel and his team almost lost their lives and their valuable equipment sank. Despite the difficulties, Preobrazhensky managed to map the area cutting across several places and outlining the entire North Baikal Highlands. His data revealed that it was a complex system of distinct high massifs, gathered either in small irregular groups or in short ridges, that were separated from each other by deep and narrow valleys. In the western part of the North Baikal mountainous land he mapped for the first time a 175 kilometers (109 mi) stretch of the Akitkan Range.

== Geography ==
The North Baikal Highlands are separated from the Patom Highlands to the northeast by river Vitim, a tributary of the Lena. The highlands stretch southwards to the Upper Angara Range and southeastwards to the Delyun-Uran Range. To the northwest begins the Central Siberian Plateau and to the east the Delyun-Uran Range of the Stanovoy Highlands. The average altitudes range between 1,000 meters (3,300 ft) and 1,600 meters (5,200 ft) with narrow valleys in between that coincide with tectonic faults across the highlands.

The highest point is 2,514 metres (8,248 ft) high Golets Inyaptuk in the southern part, located at 56°24′14″N 111°5′7″E in the Buryatian zone of the highlands. There are clear traces of ancient glaciation in the uppermost parts of the ranges.

The main subranges are:

- Synnyr Massif (Сынныр), highest point 2,578 metres (8,458 ft)
- Akitkan Range (хребет Акиткан), highest point 2,067 metres (6,781 ft)
- Ungdar Range (хребет Унгдар), highest point 2,293 metres (7,523 ft)
- Upper Angara Range (Верхнеангарский хребет), highest point 2,641 metres (8,665 ft)

=== Hydrography ===
The rivers of the North Baikal Highlands belong to the Baikal and Lena basins. Their valleys are deep. The main ones are the 512 kilometers (318 mi) long Chuya, the 353 kilometers (219 mi) long Chaya, the 231 kilometers (144 mi) long Chechuy, the 176 kilometers (109 mi) long Minya, the 162 kilometers (101 mi) long Mogol, the 155 kilometers (96 mi) long Okunayka, the 141 kilometers (88 mi) long Kutima, the 125 kilometers (78 mi) long Tyya, the 115 kilometers (71 mi) long Domugda and the 97 kilometers (60 mi) long Cherepakhina. The highland area is marked by permafrost.

== Flora ==
There are taiga forests of conifers, mostly larch, in the slopes of the mountains. At higher altitudes there is mountain tundra. Further up the mountaintops are either flat or topped by golets-type bare rocky summits.

== See also ==
- List of mountains and hills of Russia
