= Synnyr Massif =

Mountain range in Buryatia

Synnyr Сынныр
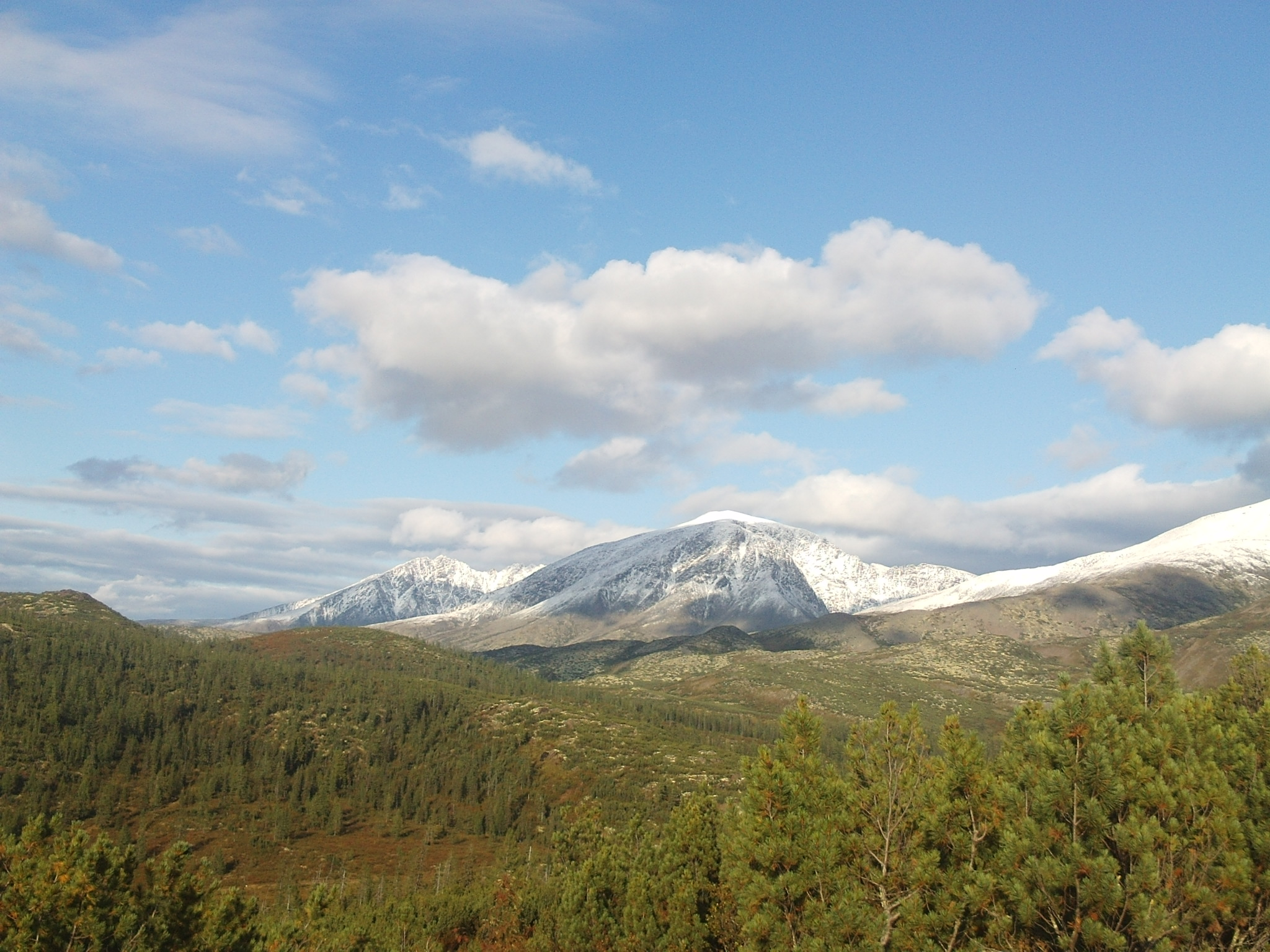
- View of the Inyaptuk Golets.

Highest point
- Peak: Inyaptuk Golets
- Elevation: 2,514 m (8,248 ft)
- Coordinates: 56°24′14″N 111°5′7″E

Dimensions
- Length: 200 km (120 mi) SW / NE
- Width: 50 km (31 mi)

Geography
- Location within Republic of Buryatia
- Country: Russia
- Federal subject: Buryatia / Irkutsk Oblast
- Range coordinates: 56°45′N 111°0′E
- Parent range: North Baikal Highlands; South Siberian System

Geology
- Rock age: Late Riphean
- Rock type(s): Gneiss, crystalline schist, volcanic rock

Climbing
- Easiest route: From Chara Airport

Synnyr (Russian: Сынныр) is a mountain massif in Irkutsk Oblast and Buryatia, Russian Federation. The range is part of the Baikal Rift Zone.

There is potash mining in the range at the Synnyr mine.

== Geography ==
The Synnyr stretches from SW to NE for roughly 200 kilometres (120 mi) between the Akitkan Range and the Upper Angara Range, west of the northwestern end of the Stanovoy Highlands, with the Patom Highlands to the north. It is limited by the valleys of the Chaya and Mama rivers. The Chuya, Kholodnaya, Tyya and Olokit have their sources in the range.

The heights of the range summits decrease from 2,500 metres (8,200 ft) in the southwest to 1,300 metres (4,300 ft)in the northeast. The highest peak is 2,514 metres (8,248 ft) high Inyaptuk Golets, a ‘’golets’’-type of mountain with a bald peak.

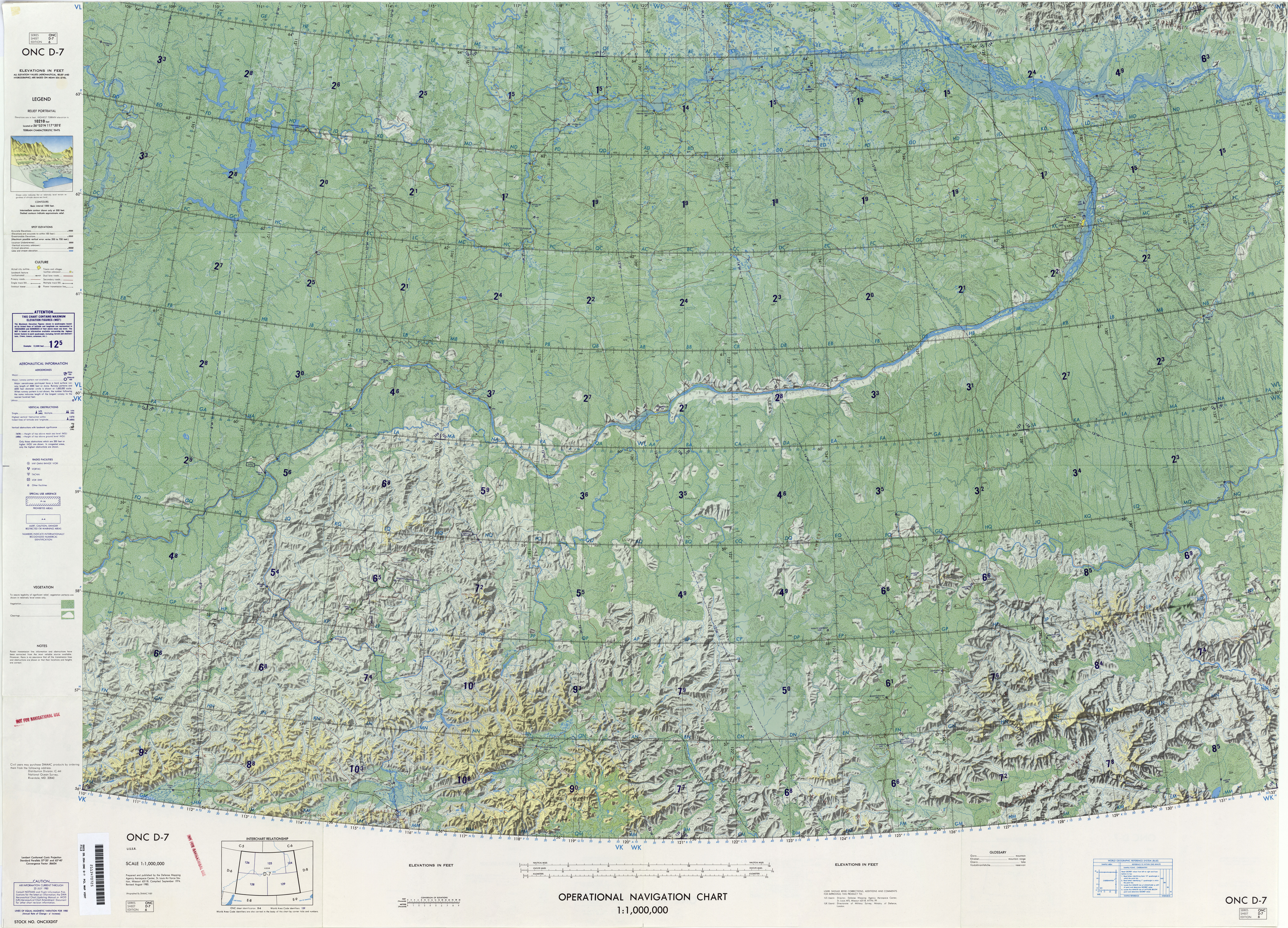
Defense Mapping Agency topographical map showing part of the Synnyr in the lower left part.

== Flora ==
The lower slopes of the range are mainly covered by larch taiga, with mountain tundra and bare rocky summits (golets) at higher elevations.

== See also ==
- Baikal Rift Zone
- List of mountains and hills of Russia
