= Ichera (disambiguation) =

Ichera may refer to:

- Ichera, a river of the Lena basin, Russia
- Ichera, Bulgaria, a village in Sliven Municipality, Bulgaria
- Ichera (rural locality), a settlement in Kirensky District, Irkutsk Oblast, Russian Far East
- Ichera Peak, a mountain in Antarctica
