= Kirensky =

Kirensky (masculine), Kirenskaya (feminine), or Kirenskoye (neuter) may refer to:

- Kirensky District, a district of Irkutsk Oblast, Russia
- Kirenskoye Urban Settlement, a municipal formation which the town of Kirensk and nine rural localities in Kirensky District of Irkutsk Oblast, Russia are incorporated as
