= Inyaptuk Golets =

Mountain in Russia

- Голец Иняптук
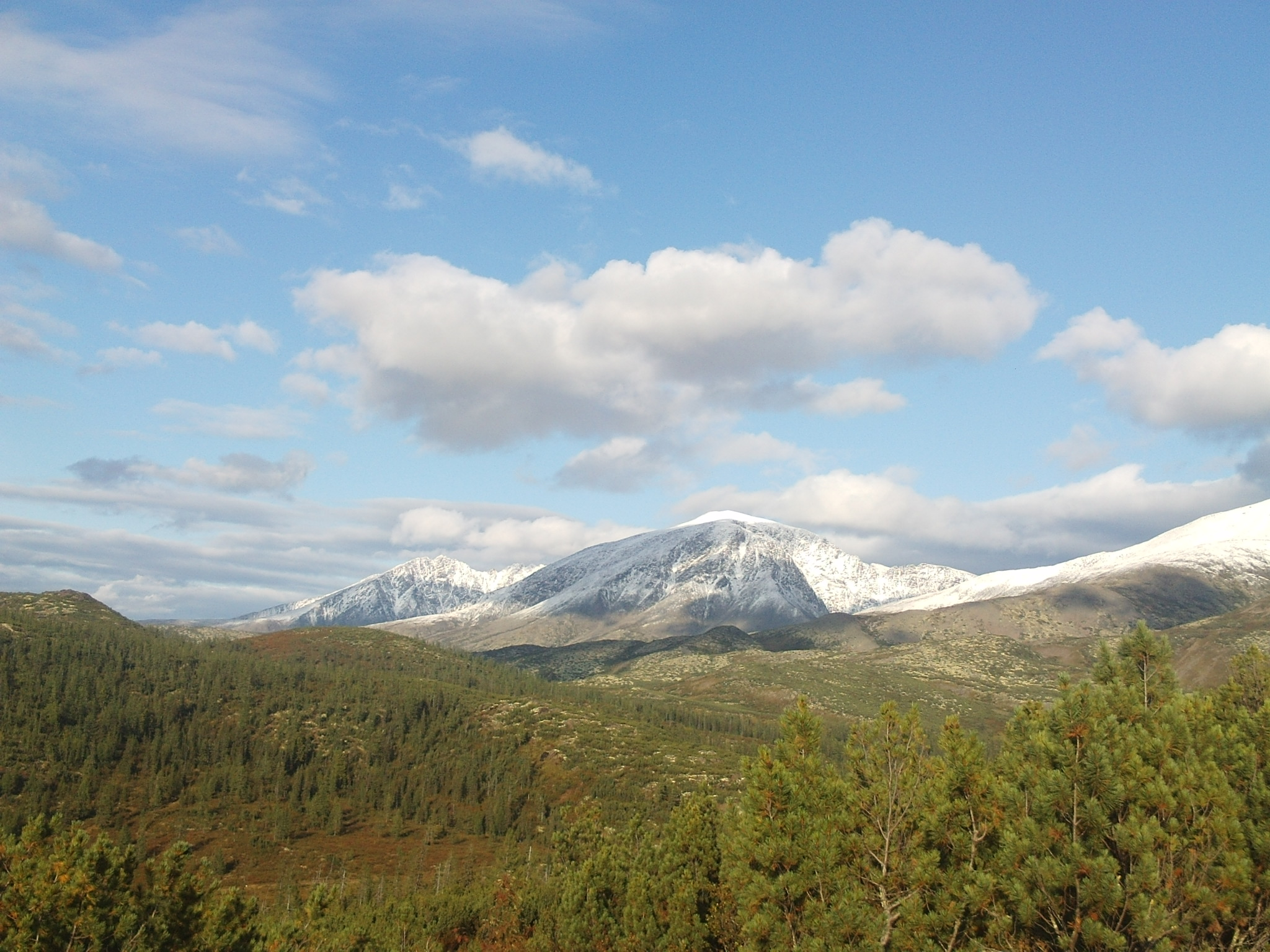
- Panoramic view of the mountain

Highest point
- Elevation: 2,514 m (8,248 ft)
- Prominence: 1,286 m (4,219 ft)
- Listing: Ribu
- Coordinates: 56°22′38″N 110°04′25″E

Geography
- Location within Republic of Buryatia
- Location: Buryatia, Russian Far East
- Parent range: Synnyr, North Baikal Highlands

Climbing
- Easiest route: From Mama

Inyaptuk Golets (Russian: Иняптук Голец) is a peak in the North Baikal Highlands. Administratively it is part of Buryatia, Russian Federation.

== Geography ==
This 1,908 m (6,260 ft) high mountain is the highest point of the North Baikal Highlands, part of the South Siberian System of ranges. It is located in the southern part of the highland area, to the north of the northern end of Lake Baikal, in Severo-Baykalsky District. River Chuya has its sources in the northern slopes of the mountain.

Inyaptuk is a ‘’golets’’-type of mountain with a bald peak belonging to the Synnyr Massif, one of the subranges of the North Baikal Highlands mountain system.

== See also ==
- List of mountains in Russia
