= Akitkan Range =

Mountain range in Buryatia

Akitkan
- Акиткан
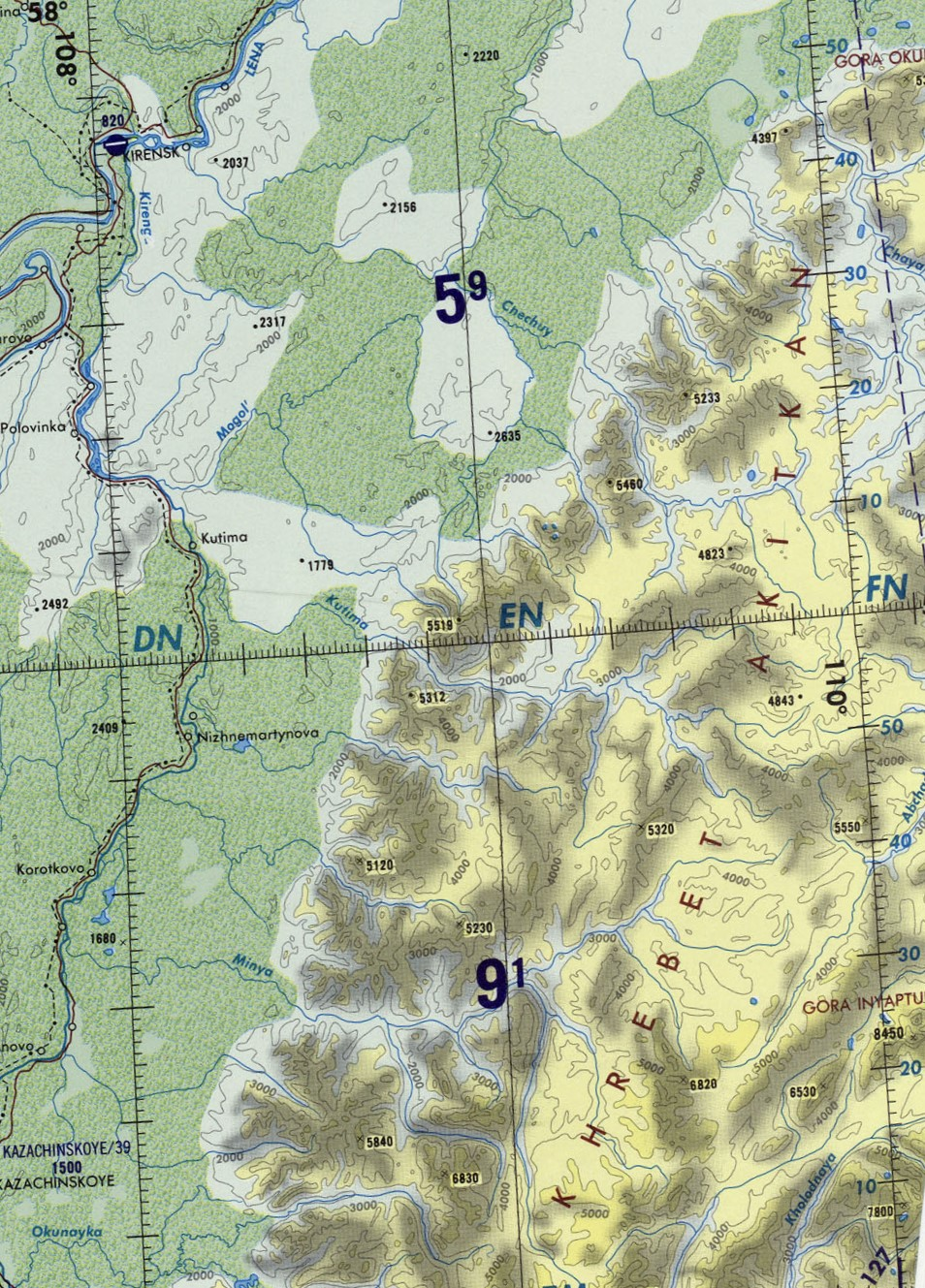
- Akitkan Range ONC map section

Highest point
- Peak: Unnamed
- Elevation: 2,067 m (6,781 ft)
- Coordinates: 56°14′N 108°49′E

Dimensions
- Length: 200 km (120 mi) SSW / NNE
- Width: 60 km (37 mi)

Geography
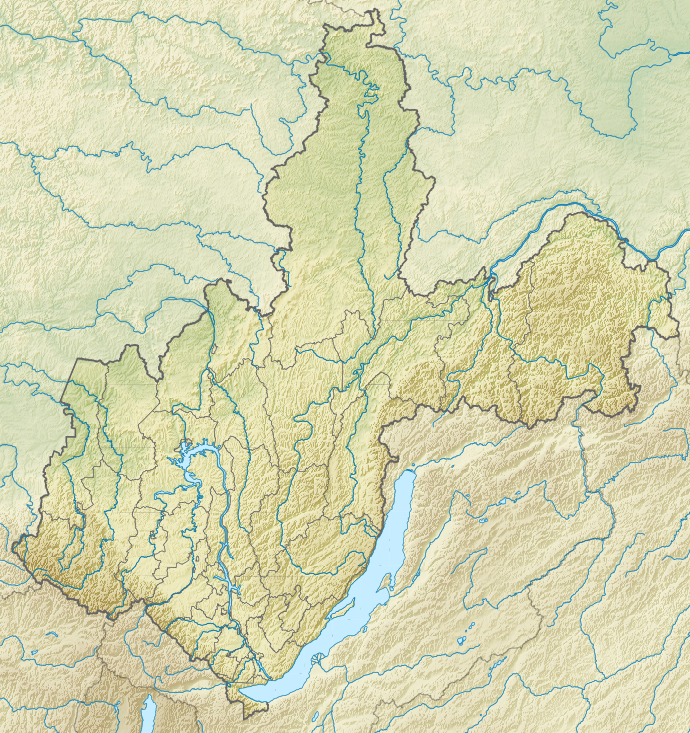
- Location within Irkutsk Oblast Location within Republic of Buryatia
- Country: Russia
- Federal subject: Buryatia / Irkutsk Oblast
- Range coordinates: 56°50′N 109°0′E
- Parent range: North Baikal Highlands; South Siberian System

Geology
- Rock type(s): Granite, volcanic rock

Climbing
- Easiest route: From Mama Airport

The Akitkan Range (Russian: хребет Акиткан; Chinese: 阿基特坎山) is a mountain range in Irkutsk Oblast and Buryatia, Russian Federation.

The Paleoproterozoic Akitkan Orogen is named after the range.

== History ==
Between 1855 and 1858 Ivan Kryzhin (d. 1884) took part in the Eastern Siberian expedition led by Russian astronomer and traveler Ludwig Schwarz. In 1857 he mapped the Kirenga River and, while exploring its right tributary, the Cherepanikha, Kryzhin discovered the formerly unknown Akitkan Range rising above the area of its source.

The North Baikal Highlands, where the range rises, were explored between 1909 and 1911 by Russian geologist Pavel Preobrazhensky (1874 - 1944). He surveyed the river valley of the Chechuy, a right tributary of the Lena with its sources in the Akitkan. Overcoming numerous difficulties, Preobrazhensky managed to map for the first time a 175 kilometers (109 mi) stretch of the Akitkan Range.

== Geography ==
The Akitkan stretches roughly northwards for over 200 kilometres (120 mi) from the northern end of the Baikal Range, northwest of Lake Baikal. It is limited by the Cis-Baikal Depression (предбайкальская впадина) to the west, the Lena to the north and the Chaya river valley to the east. To the southeast rises the Synnyr. The highest summit is a 2,067 metres (6,781 ft) high unnamed peak located at the southern end, west of the Ungdar Range. The heights of the range summits decrease from circa 2,000 metres (6,600 ft) in the southern section to 1,600 metres (5,200 ft) in the northern.

=== Hydrography ===
The Chechuy, a Lena tributary, as well as numerous tributaries of the Kirenga, such as the Minya, Okunayka and Kutima, have their sources in the range.

== Akitkan Orogen ==
The Akitkan Orogen forms a suture between the Anabar Shield to the northwest and the Aldan Shield to the southeast. It is a feature of the Siberian Craton known only from geophysical data along most of its extent because it is covered by younger rocks.

== See also ==
- List of mountains and hills of Russia
