= Lena Cheeks =

Lena Cheeks Ленские щёки
- Canyon
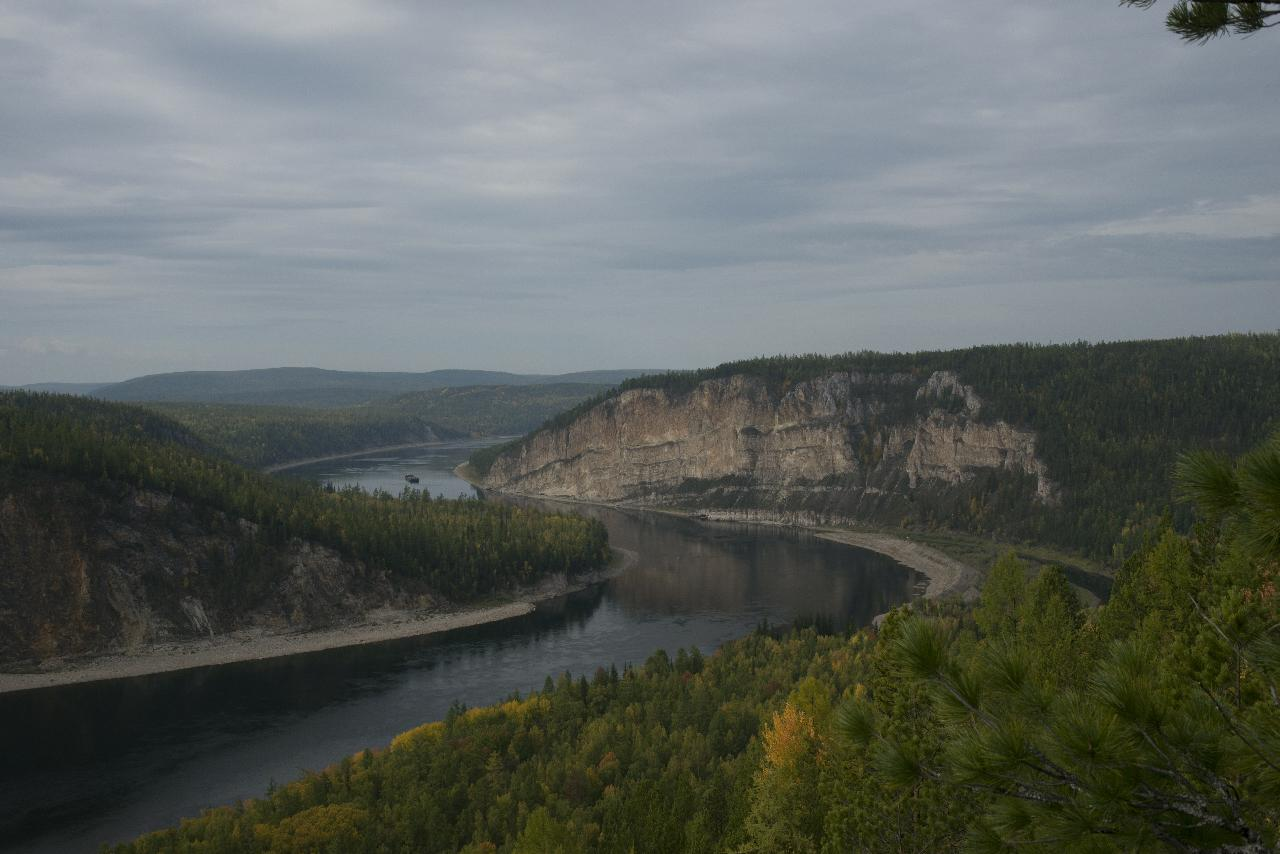
- View of the Lena Cheeks

- Location within Russia Location within Irkutsk Oblast
- Interactive map of Lena Cheeks
- Coordinates: 58°42′38″N 110°53′45″E
- Location: Irkutsk Oblast, Russia
- Part of: Lena basin
- Water bodies: Lena (river)

Dimensions
  - Length: 3 kilometres (1.9 mi)

The Lena Cheeks (Russian: Ленские щёки) is the name of a stretch of the Lena with peculiar rock formations in Kirensky District, Irkutsk Oblast, Russia.

This feature of the Lena basin is a tourist attraction regularly visited by river cruiser Mikhail Svetlov from Yakutsk.

== Description ==
The Lena Cheeks area is a roughly 3 kilometres (1.9 mi) canyon bound by cliffs where there are three characteristic rock formations known as "Cheeks". They are located between the mouths of the Ichera and the Chuya, 172 kilometres (107 mi) upstream from the mouth of the Vitim and 6 kilometres (3.7 mi) downstream from the abandoned village of Chastykh.

The rocks are called First, Second and Third cheek, the latter being the furthest downstream. The First and Third cheeks rise above the right bank, and the Second above the left bank.

== Quotes ==
The Cheeks of the Lena were described by 19th century travelers:

The days were passed in the most dreary and monotonous manner; even the celebrated Cheeks of the Lena afforded no interest at this season. These are cliffs upon each side of the Lena, between Kirenga and Vittim, which seem to have been severed from each other by some convulsion of nature, and present a remarkable appearance. (John Dundas Cochrane)

We passed some perpendicular rocks, known as the “Cheeks of the Lena,” which contracted the stream to about a quarter of a verst in width, with a current of four knots. (Sir George Simpson)

== See also ==
- Lena Pillars
- List of rock formations
