= Lugovsky =

Lugovsky Луговский
- Urban-type settlement
- Interactive map of Lugovsky
- Location of Lugovsky Lugovsky (Irkutsk Oblast)
- Coordinates: 58.0642°N 112.8808°E
- Country: Russia
- Federal subject: Irkutsk Oblast
- Administrative district: Mamsko-Chuysky District
- Elevation: 286 m (938 ft)

Population (2010 Census)
  - Total: 503
  - Estimate (2025): 362 (−28%)
- Time zone: UTC+8 (MSK+5)
- Postal code: 666801
- OKTMO ID: 25624170051

Lugovsky (Russian: Луговский) is an urban locality (an urban-type settlement) in Mamsko-Chuysky District of Irkutsk Oblast, Russia. Population: 503 (2010 census); 633 (2002 census); 2,939 (1989 Soviet census).

== Geography ==
It is located by the Mama river.
