= Design 414N tankers =

- Tanker general view

Class overview
- Name: 414N Russian: 414Н

General characteristics
- Class & type: Oil tanker
- Capacity: 600 tons of oil
- Notes: River tank ship

414N Russian: 414Н is a river tank ship class, developed in Russia in 1962. The class 414 is one of the classes of the SPN ship project. These tankers have capacity of 600 tons and are used for oil transportation on the superficial rivers of Siberia (basically Lena River).

== SPN-673 ==
This tanker belonged to the Kirenskaya repair-operational base in Kirensk and was equipped for oil transportation. The captain of the vessel at the moment of incident was Bulgakov Victor Vasilevich. On October 13, 2009, the tanker, carrying a cargo of 496 tons of diesel fuel, was close to Ichera settlement on the Lena River when the steering refused to respond, causing the ship to run into a flooded barge.

There were no injuries, after the cargo was swapped to the "Capitan Verkhoturov" tanker and sent to its destination, 18 people and 3 other vessels took part in refloating the ship. Initially it was believed the ship was not damaged, but after surveying the refloated ship it was found that the bottom of the ship and the empty storage tanks 11 and 12 were damaged. The ship was removed from the bank at 2:00 on October 16 and towed off for survey in Kirensk by steam-ship "Zcuya".

As a result of the investigation into the circumstances of the incident it was found that a failure to report a danger by the steam-ship "Captain Ineshin" meant that the tanker hit the barge. The investigation determined three guilty parties:

- The captain of tanker SPN-673 had withdrawn from management of the vessel and had not transferred command of a vessel to the senior assistant.
- The senior assistant SPN-673 did not promptly report the accident to the ship-owner and the emergency services.
- The captain of the steam-ship "Captain Ineshin", had not given necessary warning about a dangerous area, and after the incident did not stop to provide assistance.

All of them received fines, the money was spent by the Osetrovsky transport public prosecutor.

== SPN-705 ==
This tanker belonged to the Yakut river shipping company and had been equipped to transport natural gasoline traversing Indigirka and Moma River to deliver fuel from Belaya Gora to Moma Airport. On June 28, 1996, at 11:00 there was an explosion on the ship, causing a large fire. At 12:00 fire boats and auxiliary vessels from port Belaya Gora arrived along with fire-engines on the coast although the fire was not fully extinguished till 17.30. The explosion created a large hole in the tanker which sank shortly after the fire was put out. The fire caused the death of ship mechanic Victor Firstov, and captain of the tanker Jury Grabkin was severely wounded. The other five crew members were uninjured.
