= Synnyr mine =

Potash mine in Russia

- Location: Synnyr Massif, Sakha Republic, Russia
- Products: Potash

The Synnyr mine is a large potash mine located in eastern Russia in Sakha Republic. Synnyr represents one of the largest potash reserves in Russia having estimated reserves of 500 million tonnes of ore grading 19% potassium chloride metal.

== See also ==
- List of mines in Russia
