= Chechuy =

River in Irkutsk Oblast, Russia

Chechuy Чечуй
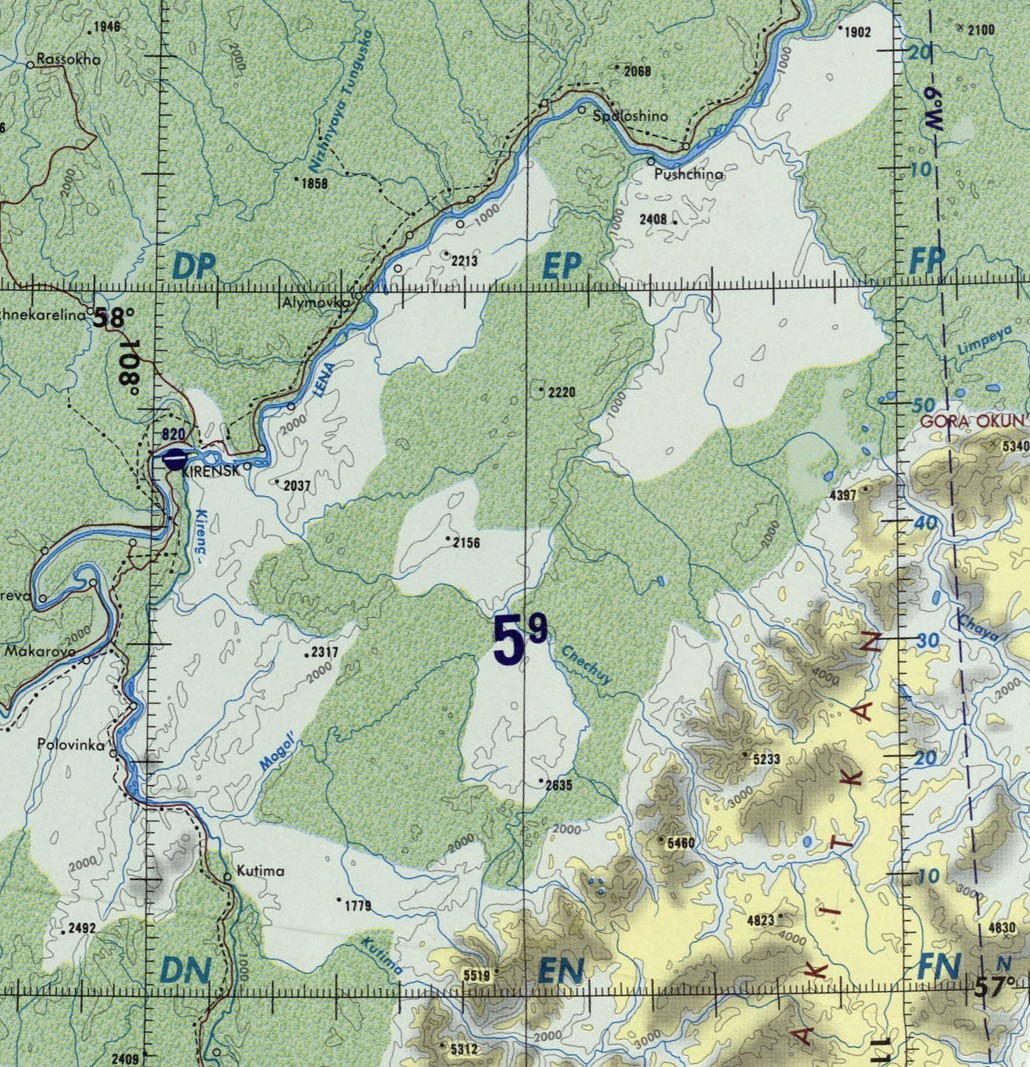
- Chechuy river course ONC map section

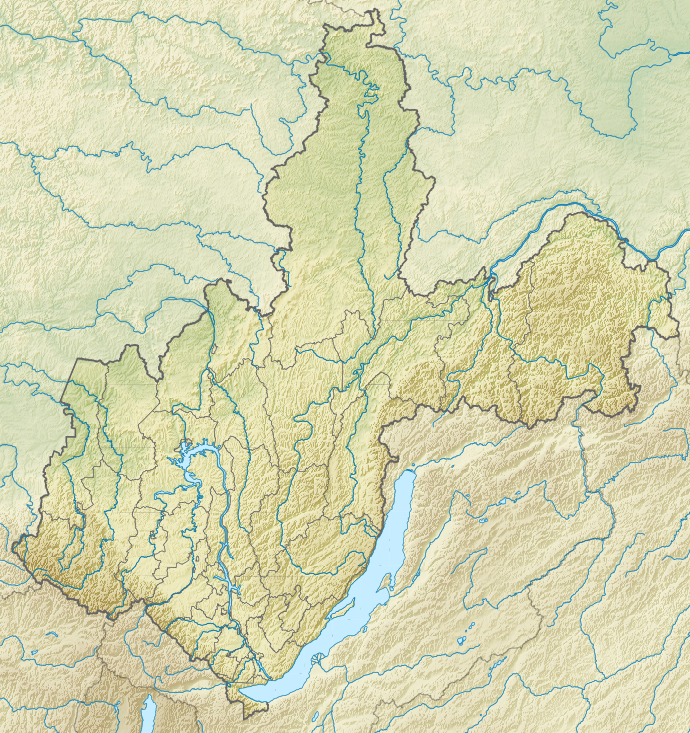
- Mouth location in Irkutsk Oblast, Russia

Location
- Country: Russia

Physical characteristics
- Source
  - location: Akitkan Range
  - coordinates: 56°59′33″N 109°51′53″E
- Mouth: Lena
  - location: Near Pushchino
  - coordinates: 58°11′52″N 109°19′11″E
  - elevation: 230 m (750 ft)
- Length: 231 km (144 mi)
- Basin size: 6,290 km^{2} (2,430 sq mi)
- Discharge
  - average: 114.55 m^{3}/s (4,045 cu ft/s)

Basin features
- Progression: Lena→ Laptev Sea

The Chechuy (Russian: Чечуй) is a river in Irkutsk Oblast, Russia. It is a tributary of the Lena with a length of 231 kilometres (144 mi) and a drainage basin area of 6,290 square kilometres (2,430 mi^{2}).

The river flows across an uninhabited area of the Kirensky District. Puschino village is located by the right bank, near the confluence with the Lena and there are other villages in the area, close to the Lena's shore.

== History ==
Between 1909 and 1911 the North Baikal Highlands were explored by Russian geologist Pavel Preobrazhensky (1874 - 1944). He surveyed the river valleys of the area, all of them tributaries of the Lena basin, including the Chechuy.

== Course ==
The Chechuy is a right tributary of the Lena. It has its sources in the Akitkan Range of the North Baikal Highlands. It heads first northwestwards across the mountain area. Approximately in mid course, the river turns to the NNE and flows roughly in that direction until it reaches the Lena. Finally it meets the right bank of the Lena 3,034 kilometres (1,885 mi) from its mouth, near Puschino, a little downstream from Zolotoy, and 16 kilometres (9.9 mi) downstream from the mouth of the Pilyuda.

=== Tributaries ===
The largest tributaries of the Chechuy are the 117 kilometres (73 mi) long Lower Rassokha (Нижняя Рассоха) and the 81 kilometres (50 mi) long Middle Rassokha (Средняя Рассоха) that join it from the right. The river freezes yearly between October and May.

== See also ==
- List of rivers of Russia
