= Pilyuda =

River in Irkutsk Oblast, Russia

Pilyuda Пилюда
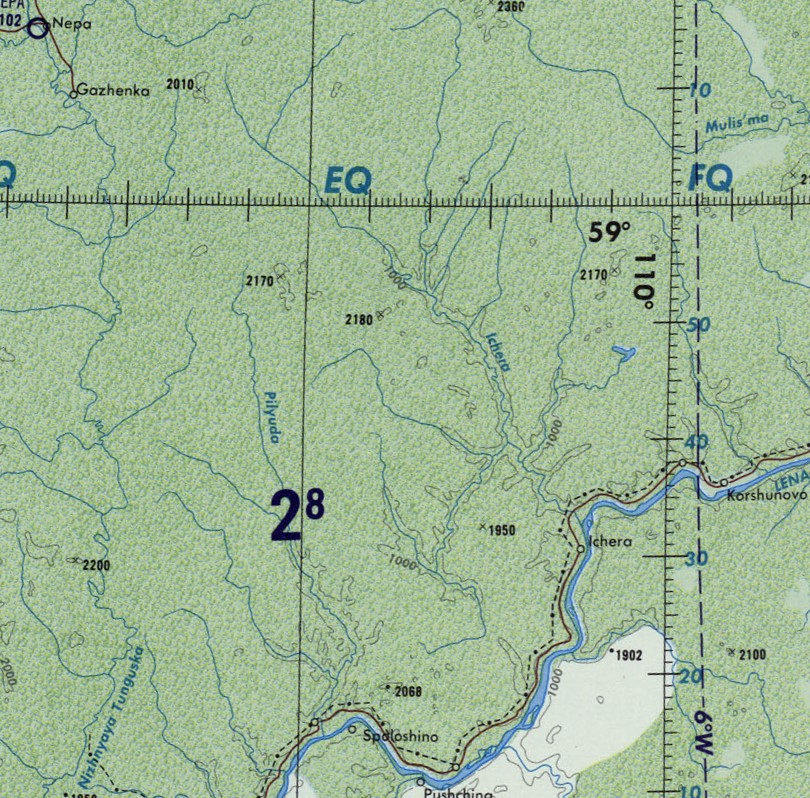
- Pilyuda and Ichera basins ONC map section

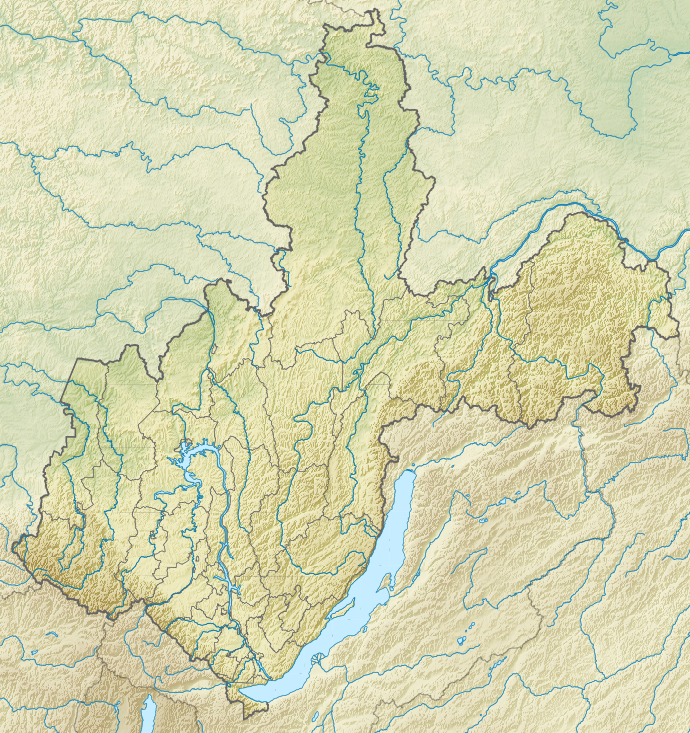
- Mouth location in Irkutsk Oblast, Russia

Location
- Country: Russia

Physical characteristics
- Source
  - location: Lena Plateau
  - coordinates: 58°55′09″N 108°49′42″E
  - elevation: 404 m (1,325 ft)
- Mouth: Lena
  - location: Near Orlova
  - coordinates: 58°16′33″N 109°07′06″E
  - elevation: 232 m (761 ft)
- Length: 105 km (65 mi)
- Basin size: 1,760 km^{2} (680 sq mi)
- Discharge
  - average: 10.17 m^{3}/s (359 cu ft/s)

Basin features
- Progression: Lena→ Laptev Sea

The Pilyuda (Russian: Пилюда) is a river in Irkutsk Oblast, Russia. It is a tributary of the Lena with a length of 105 kilometres (65 mi) and a drainage basin area of 1,760 square kilometres (680 mi^{2}).

The river flows across an uninhabited area of the Kirensky District. Orlova village is located by the left bank, near the confluence with the Lena.

== Course ==
The Pilyuda is a left tributary of the Lena. It has its sources in the Lena Plateau and flows at its southwestern limit. To the west of its basin the Lower Tunguska of the Yenisey basin, flows northwards. The Pilyuda heads in a roughly southern direction across a taiga area of low, smooth hills. Finally, it meets the Lena 3,050 kilometres (1,900 mi) from its mouth, opposite Spoloshino, 16 kilometres (9.9 mi) upstream from the mouth of the Chechuy.

The largest tributary of the Pilyuda is the 70 kilometres (43 mi) long Rassokha that joins it from the right. The river freezes yearly between October and May.

== See also ==
- List of rivers of Russia
