= Ichera (rural locality) =

Village in Irkutsk Oblast, Russia

Ichera Ичера
- Selo
- Interactive map of Ichera
- Location of Ichera Ichera (Irkutsk Oblast)
- Coordinates: 58°30′54″N 109°46′29″E
- Country: Russia
- Federal subject: Irkutsk Oblast

Population (2010 Census)
  - Total: 1,965
  - Estimate (2012): 5 (−99.7%)

Municipal status
  - Municipal district: Kirensky District
- Time zone: UTC+8 (MSK+5)
- Postal code: 666745
- OKTMO ID: 25620419105

Ichera (Russian: Ичера or Ичёра) is a rural locality (rural-type settlement) in Kirensky District of Irkutsk Oblast, Russia. Population: 6 (2010 census); 12 (2002 census);

== Geography ==
The village is located on the left bank of the Lena, a little upstream from the mouth of the Ichera.

== See also ==
- SPN-673 incident
