= Magistralny =

Magistralny Магистральный
- Urban-type settlement
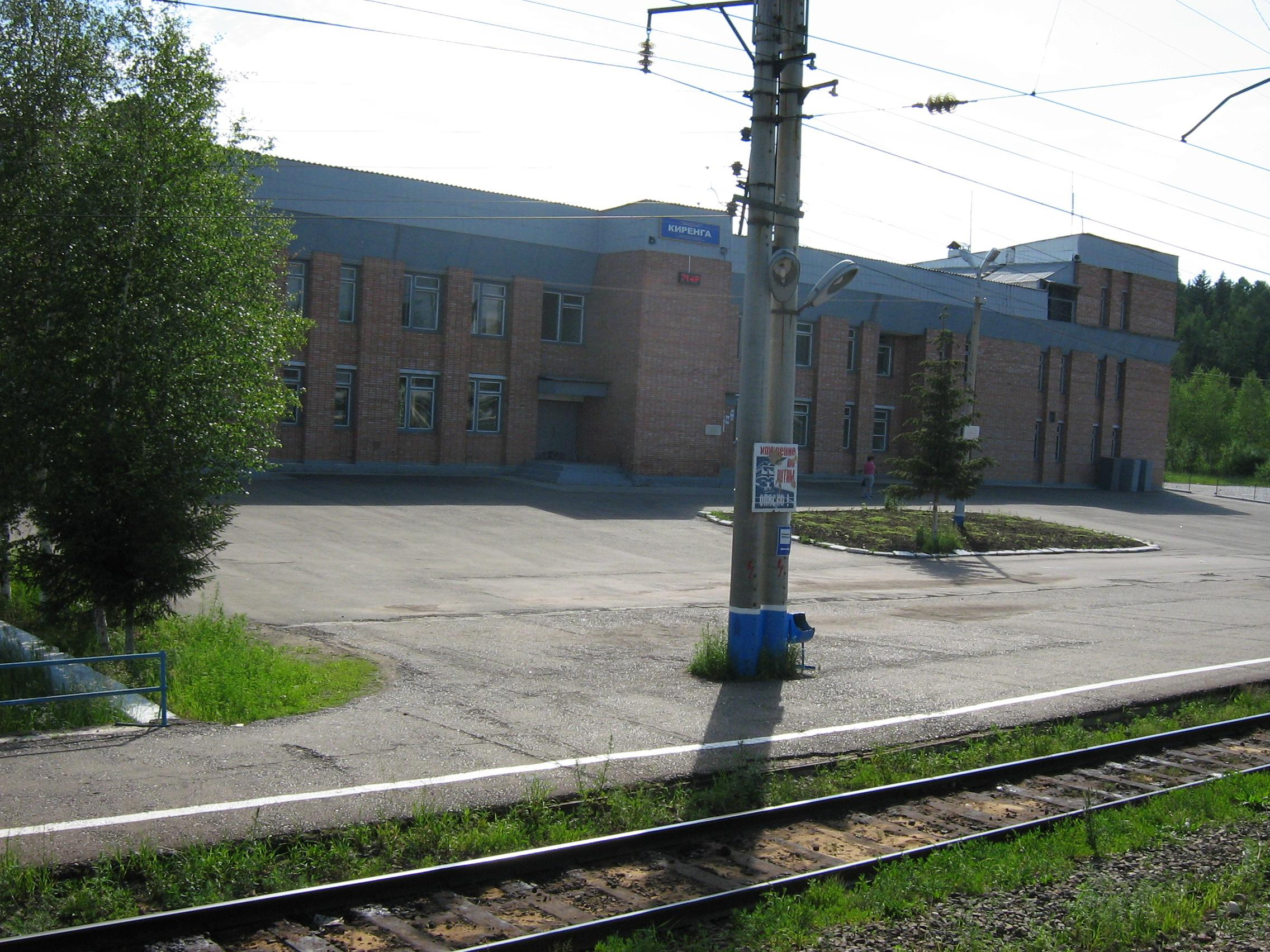
- Kirenga BAM station at Magistralny

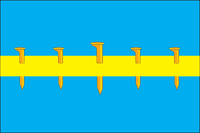
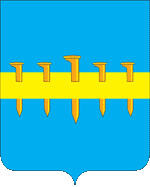
- Flag Coat of arms
- Interactive map of Magistralny
- Location of Magistralny Magistralny (Irkutsk Oblast)
- Coordinates: 56.1769°N 107.4548°E
- Country: Russia
- Federal subject: Irkutsk Oblast
- Administrative district: Kazachinsko-Lensky District
- Founded: 1974
- Elevation: 462 m (1,516 ft)

Population (2010 Census)
  - Total: 7,067
  - Estimate (2025): 5,632 (−20.3%)
- Time zone: UTC+8 (MSK+5)
- Postal code: 666505
- OKTMO ID: 25614154051

Magistralny (Russian: Магистральный) is an urban locality (an urban-type settlement) in Kazachinsko-Lensky District of Irkutsk Oblast, Russia. Population: 7,067 (2010 census); 7,627 (2002 census); 8,716 (1989 Soviet census).

== Geography ==
Magistralny is located by the Kirenga river. It lies on the route of the Ust-Kut - Severobaikalsk highway and the Baikal-Amur Mainline.
