= Chaya (Lena) =

River in Russia

Chaya Чая
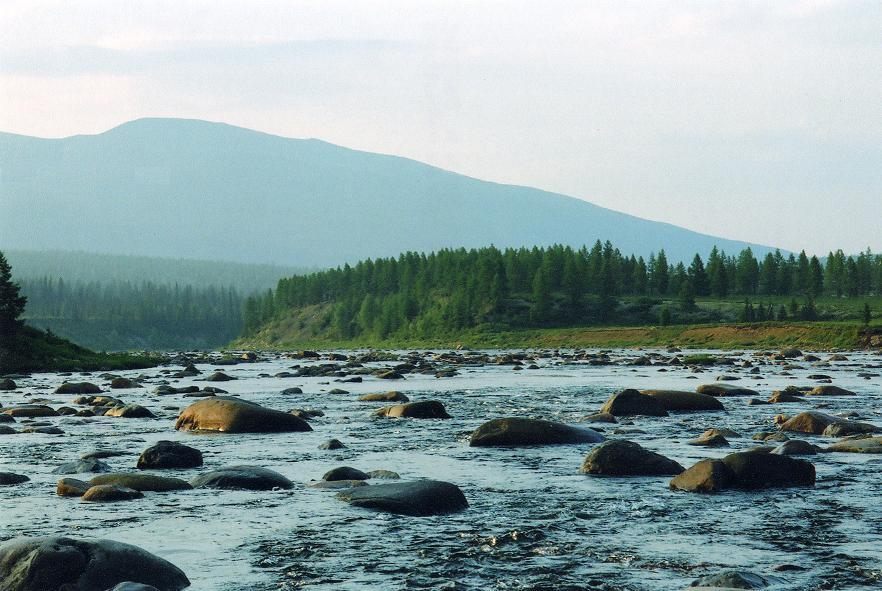
- View of the river

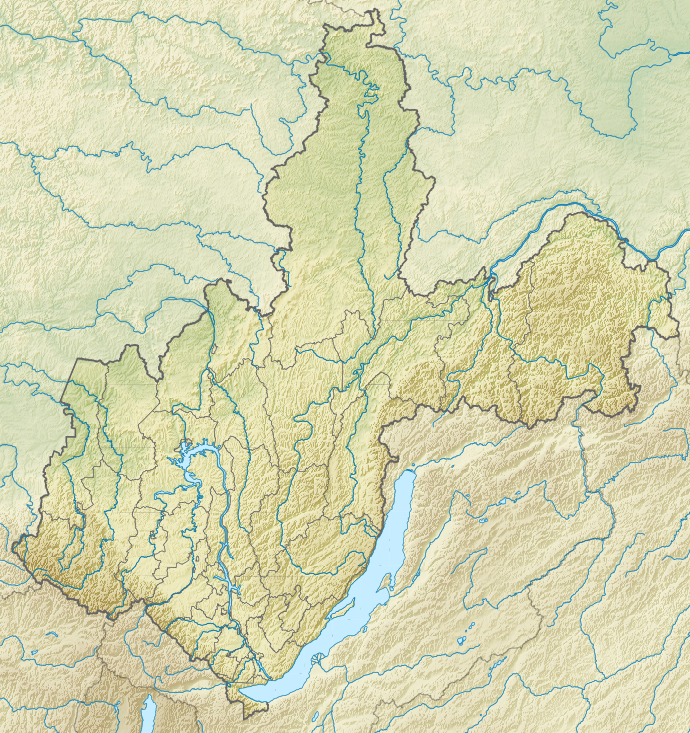
- Mouth location in Irkutsk Oblast, Russia

Location
- Country: Russia

Physical characteristics
- Source
  - location: Upper Angara Range, Buryatia
  - coordinates: 56°17′06″N 110°37′30″E
  - elevation: 1,775 m (5,823 ft)
- Mouth: Lena
  - location: Irkutsk Oblast
  - coordinates: 58°14′11″N 109°33′26″E
  - elevation: 228 m (748 ft)
- Length: 353 km (219 mi)
- Basin size: 11,400 km^{2} (4,400 sq mi)
- Discharge
  - average: 180 m^{3}/s (6,400 cu ft/s)

Basin features
- Progression: Lena→ Laptev Sea

The Chaya (Russian: Чая) is a river in Buryatia and Irkutsk Oblast, Russia. It is the 26th longest tributary of the Lena, with a length of 353 kilometres (219 mi) and a drainage basin area of 11,400 square kilometres (4,400 mi^{2}). The Chaya flows across Kirensky District, there are no settlements on the banks of the river.

In the International scale of river difficulty the Chaya is a Class IV-V destination for rafting and kayaking.

== Course ==
The Chaya is a right tributary of the Lena. It has its sources in an alpine lake of the Upper Angara Range. It flows mainly northwards at the bottom of a glacial valley in its upper course. Then it flows across the North Baikal Highlands within a narrow valley, with the Akitkan Range to the west, easing into the Prebaikal Depression in a roughly NNW direction, where its channel divides into branches. The riverbed is very rocky all along. Finally the Chaya meets the right bank of the Lena, about 100 kilometres (62 mi) downstream from Kirensk, 3,017 kilometres (1,875 mi) from the Lena's mouth in the Laptev Sea.

The main tributaries of the Chaya are the Magdana, Nalimda and Limpeya from the right, and the Olokit, Abchada and Kilyakta from the left. Snow falls usually from November to March in the area of the river.

Basin of the Lena

== Flora and fauna ==
There are larch forests all along the banks of the Chaya, with Siberian spruce in its lower course. Grayling, whitefish and lenok are among the fish species found in the waters of the river.

== See also ==
- List of rivers of Russia
