= Upper Angara Range =

Mountain range in Russia

Upper Angara Range Верхнеангарский хребет
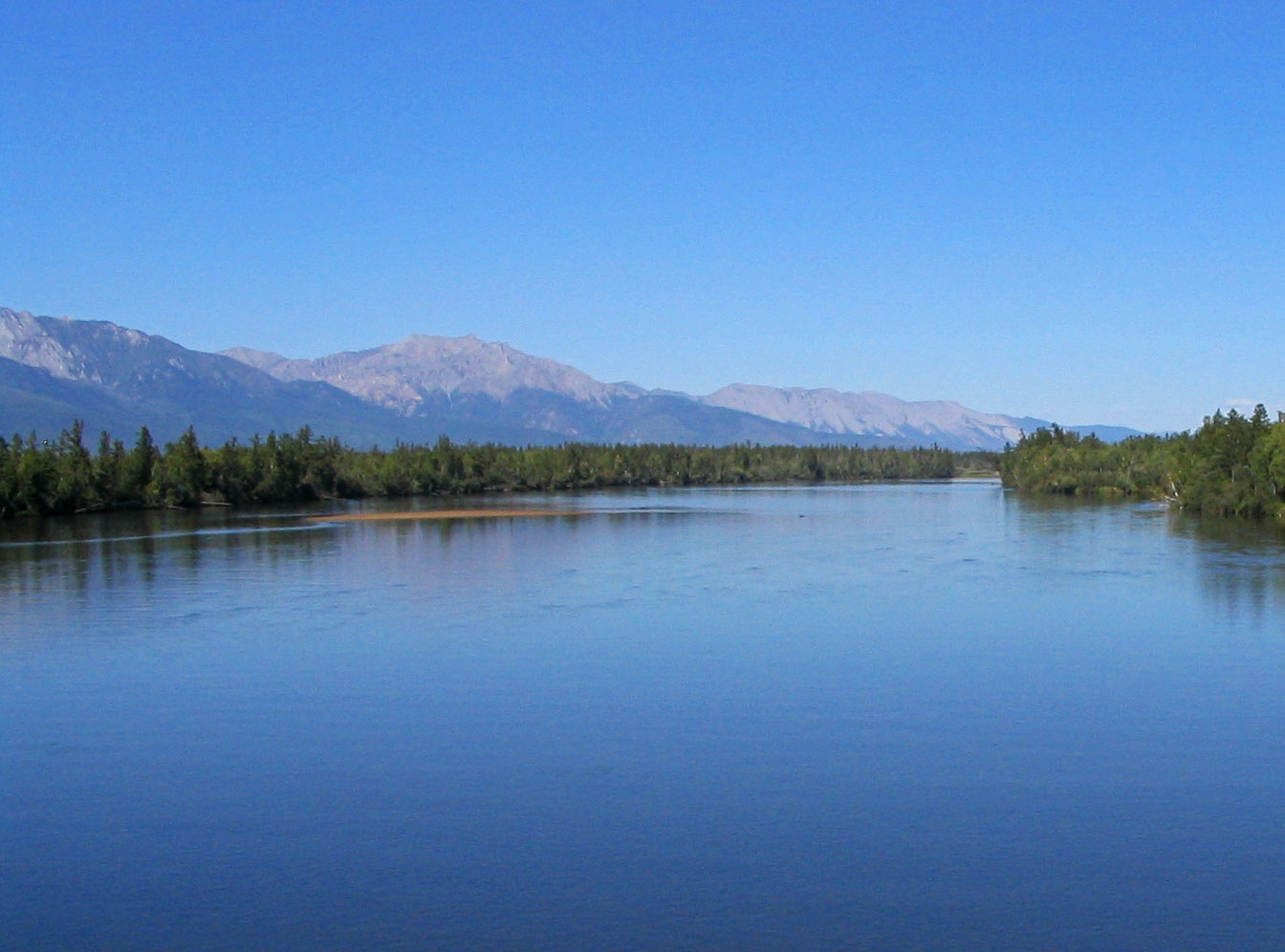
- View of the range above the Upper Angara River.

Highest point
- Peak: Unnamed
- Elevation: 2,641 m (8,665 ft)
- Coordinates: 56°21′23″N 111°38′48″E

Dimensions
- Length: 200 km (120 mi) NE-SW
- Width: 40 km (25 mi)

Geography
- Location within Republic of Buryatia
- Country: Russia
- Federal subject: Buryatia / Irkutsk Oblast
- Range coordinates: 56°20′N 111°30′E
- Parent range: North Baikal Highlands; South Siberian System

Geology
- Rock type: Crystalline rocks with granite intrusions

The Upper Angara Range (Russian: Верхнеангарский хребет) is a mountain range in Buryatia and Irkutsk Oblast, Russia, part of the Stanovoy Highlands.

The Baikal–Amur Mainline passes at the foot of the southern side of the range.

== Geography ==
The range stretches from southwest to northeast for about 200 kilometres (120 mi), from the northern end of Lake Baikal to the sources of the Mamakan river, a left tributary of the Vitim. It forms the northern limit of the Upper Angara Depression, rising above the right bank of the Upper Angara River which flows into Lake Baikal. To the east rises the Delyun-Uran, the northernmost range of the Stanovoy Highlands. The main ridge is relatively narrow, with sharp peaks, cirques and glacial troughs. The highest summit is a 2,641 metres (8,665 ft) high unnamed ultra prominent peak.

=== Hydrography ===
The range forms a watershed that separates the Mama River basin to the north from the right tributaries of the Upper Angara to the south. The Kichera, one of the rivers flowing into Baikal, originates at the southwestern end of the ridge. Rivers Left Mama and Right Mama, which form the Mama River, a tributary of the Vitim, as well as the Chaya, have their sources in the northern side of the range.

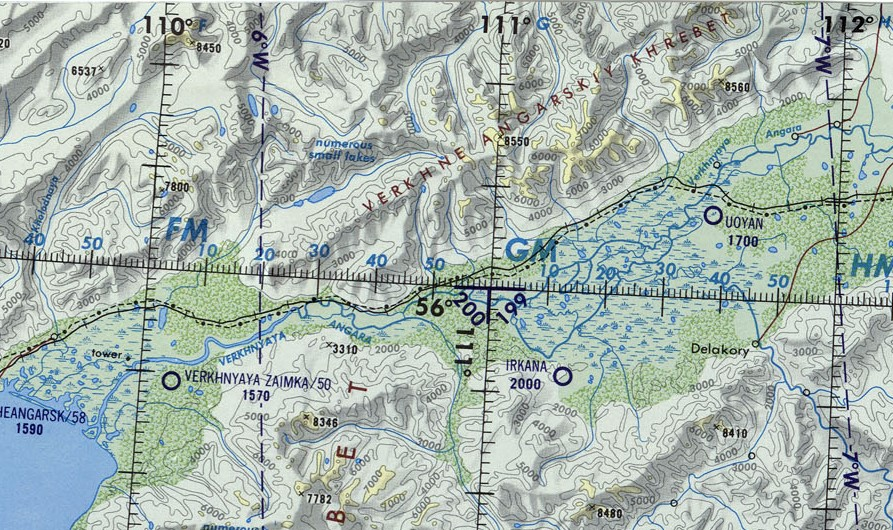
Upper Angara Range and Upper Angara River.

== Flora ==
The slopes of the range are mainly covered with larch taiga, with mountain tundra and bare summits (golets) at higher elevations.

== See also ==
- List of mountains and hills of Russia
- List of ultras of Northeast Asia
