= Ichera =

River in Irkutsk Oblast, Russia

Ichera Ичера
- Lena basin with the Ichera on the left

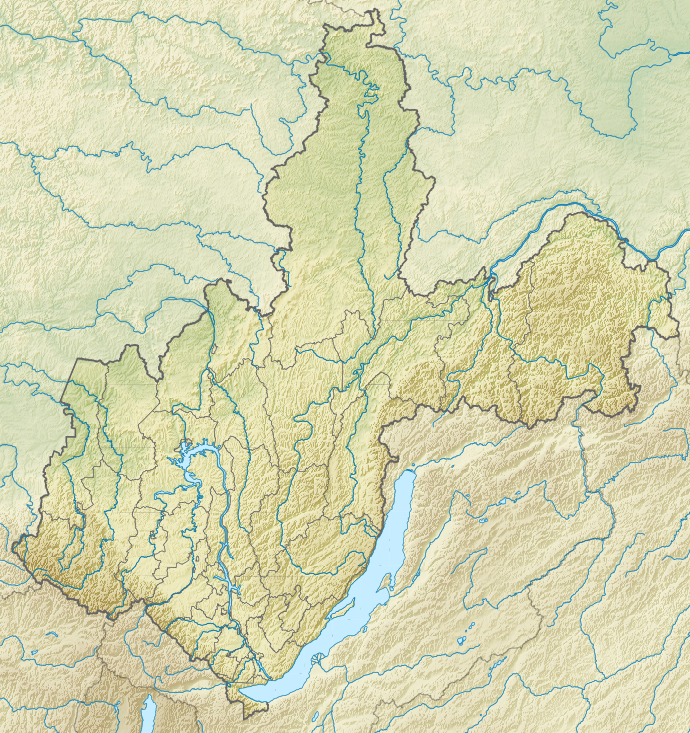
- Mouth location in Irkutsk Oblast, Russia

Location
- Country: Russia

Physical characteristics
- Source
  - location: Lena Plateau
- Mouth: Lena
  - location: Near Ichera village
  - coordinates: 58°33′02″N 109°46′02″E
- Length: 138 km (86 mi)
- Basin size: 4,501 km^{2} (1,738 sq mi)

Basin features
- Progression: Lena→ Laptev Sea

The Ichera (Russian: Ичера or Ичёра) is a river in Irkutsk Oblast, Russia. It is a tributary of the Lena with a length of 138 kilometres (86 mi) and a drainage basin area of 4,501 square kilometres (1,738 mi^{2}).

The river flows across an uninhabited area of the Kirensky District. Ichera village is located by the left bank of the Lena, a little upstream from the confluence.

== Course ==
The Ichera is a left tributary of the Lena. It is formed in the western part of the Lena Plateau. The river heads in a roughly southeastern direction across a taiga area. Finally it meets the Lena 2,973 kilometres (1,847 mi) from its mouth, 77 kilometres (48 mi) downstream from the mouth of the Pilyuda.

The largest tributaries of the Ichera are the 78 kilometres (48 mi) long Maly Rassokha, the 66 kilometres (41 mi) long Demyanka and the 48 kilometres (30 mi) long Turpa that join it from the left, as well as the 72 kilometres (45 mi) long Levaya Rassokha from the right. The river freezes yearly between October and May.

== See also ==
- Lena Cheeks
- List of rivers of Russia
