= Kirensky District =

Kirensky District Киренский район (Russian)
- District
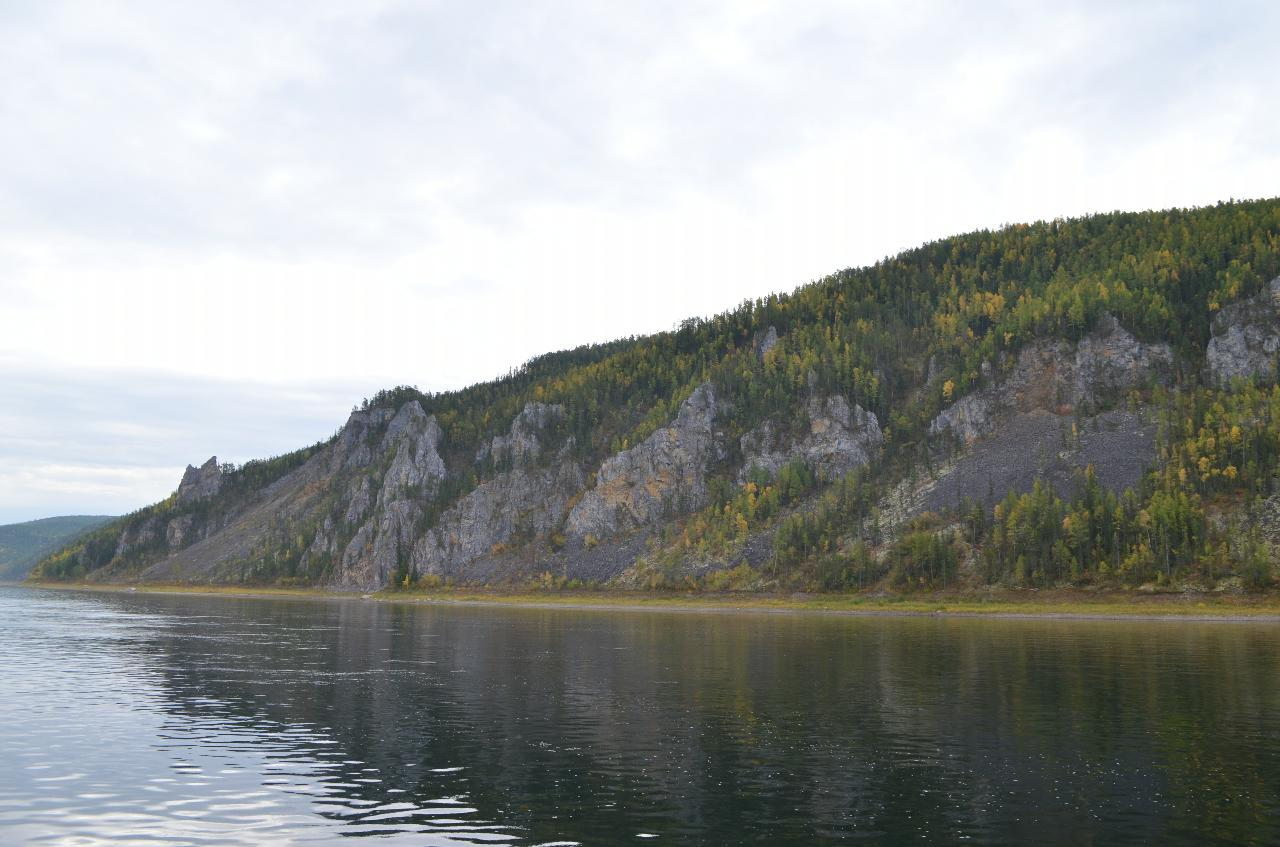
- Lena Cheeks on the Lena River, Kirensky District

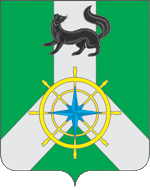
- Flag Coat of arms
- Location of Kirensky District in Irkutsk Oblast
- Coordinates: 57°47′N 108°06′E
- Country: Russia
- Federal subject: Irkutsk Oblast
- Established: 1929
- Administrative center: Kirensk

Area
  - Total: 43,904.69 km^{2} (16,951.70 sq mi)

Population (2010 Census)
  - Total: 20,322
  - Density: 0.46287/km^{2} (1.1988/sq mi)
  - Urban: 74.6%
  - Rural: 25.4%

Administrative structure
  - Inhabited localities: 1 cities/towns, 1 urban-type settlements, 43 rural localities

Municipal structure
  - Municipally incorporated as: Kirensky Municipal District
  - Municipal divisions: 2 urban settlements, 9 rural settlements
- Time zone: UTC+8 (MSK+5)
- OKTMO ID: 25620000
- Website: http://kirenskrn.irkobl.ru

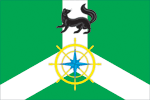

Population of Kirensky District
- 2010 Census: 20,322
- 2002 Census: 23,830
- 1989 Census: 29,280
- 1979 Census: 29,219

Kirensky District (Russian: Ки́ренский райо́н) is an administrative district, one of the thirty-three in Irkutsk Oblast, Russia. Municipally, it is incorporated as Kirensky Municipal District. It is located in the northeast of the oblast. The area of the district is 43,904.69 square kilometers (16,951.70 sq mi). Its administrative center is the town of Kirensk. As of the 2010 Census, the total population of the district was 20,322, with the population of Kirensk accounting for 62.2% of that number.

== Geography ==
Kirensky district is located in the northeastern area of Irkutsk Oblast. It borders to the north with the Sakha Republic (Yakutia) and to the southeast with the Republic of Buryatia.

The Lena flows across the district. Its main tributaries in the region are the Kirenga, Chechuy, Chaya, Pilyuda and Ichera.

== History ==
The district was established in 1929.

== Administrative and municipal status ==
Within the framework of administrative divisions, Kirensky District is one of the thirty-three in the oblast. The town of Kirensk serves as its administrative center.

As a municipal division, the district is incorporated as Kirensky Municipal District.
