= Mama Airport =

- IATA: none; ICAO: UIKM

Summary
- Airport type: Public
- Operator: FGUP "Airport Mama"
- Location: Mama, Russia
- Elevation AMSL: 659 ft / 201 m
- Coordinates: 58°18′48″N 112°53′24″E

Map
- Location of the airport in Irkutsk Oblast Mama Airport (Russia)

Runways
Direction	Length		Surface
Direction	ft	m	Surface
15/33	5,453	1,662	Concrete

Mama Airport (Russian: Аэропорт Мама) (ICAO: UIKM) is an airport in Irkutsk Oblast, Russia, located 1 kilometer (0.62 mi) northwest of Mama on the Vitim River. It is a small airfield near the town center. Angara Airlines serves scheduled flights to Irkutsk (Irkutsk International Airport) three times a week.

== See also ==
- List of airports in Russia
