= Kirenga =

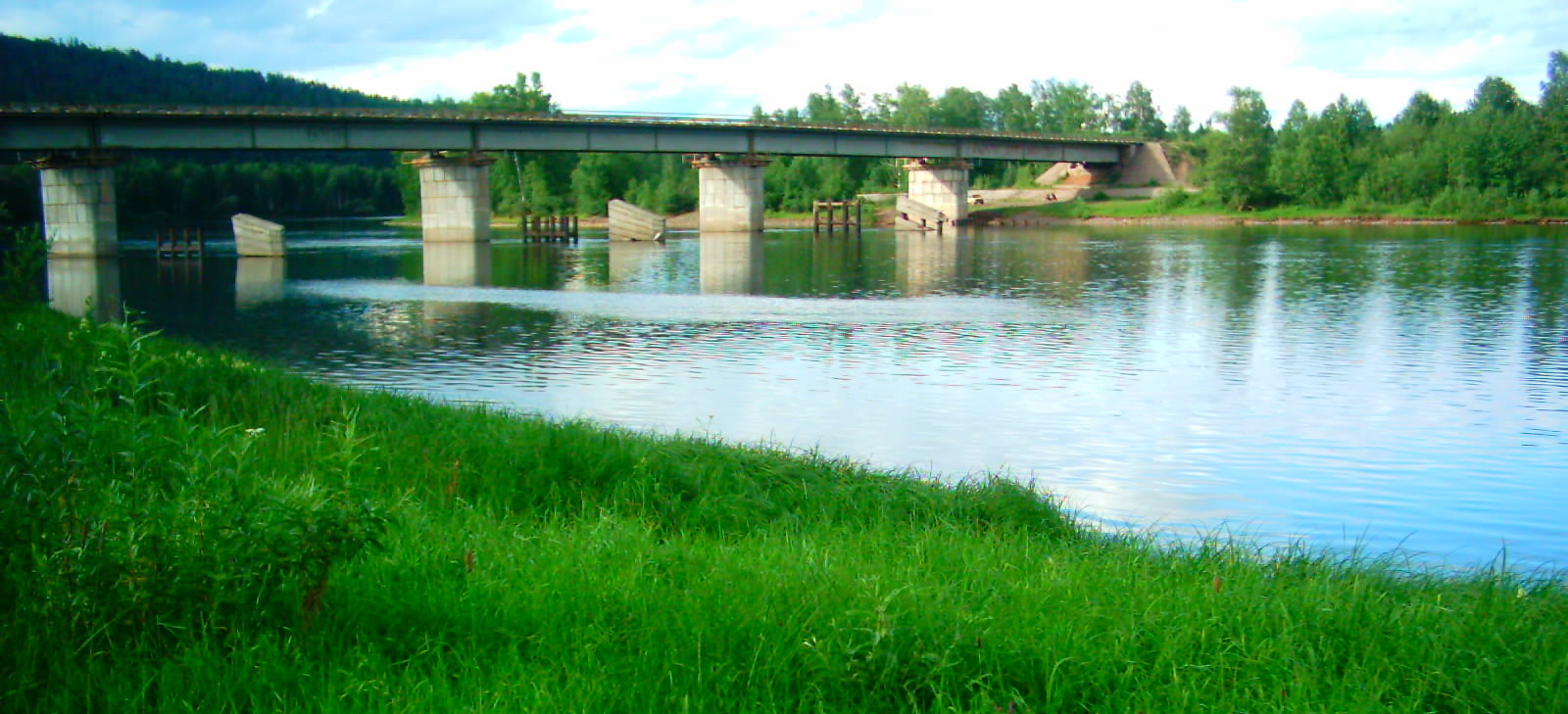
- The Kirenga at Magistralny

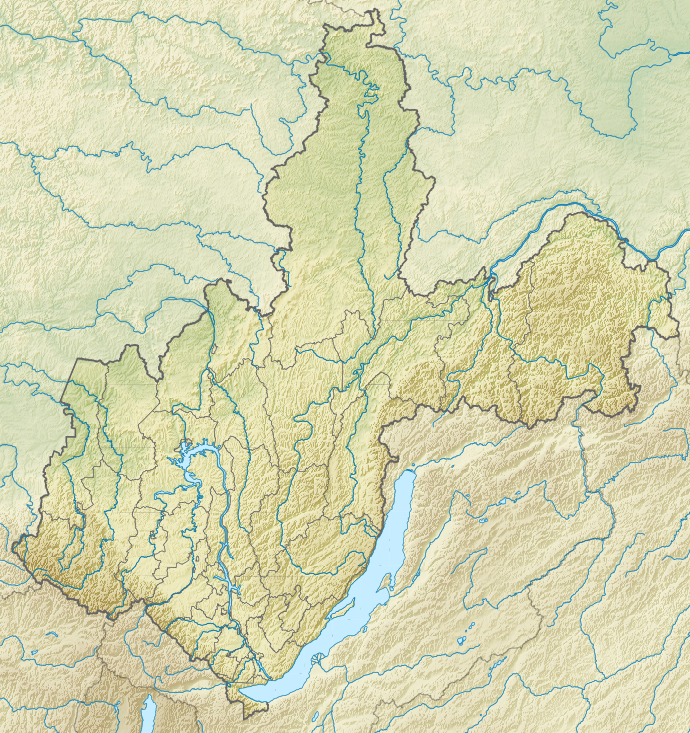
- Mouth location in Irkutsk Oblast, Russia

Location
- Country: Russia

Physical characteristics
- Source: Baikal Mountains
  - elevation: ca 1,500 m (4,900 ft)
- Mouth: Lena
  - coordinates: 57°46′08″N 108°07′48″E
  - elevation: 250 m (820 ft)
- Length: 746 km (464 mi)
- Basin size: 46,600 km^{2} (18,000 sq mi)
- Discharge
  - average: 658 m^{3}/s (23,200 cu ft/s)

Basin features
- Progression: Lena→ Laptev Sea

The Kirenga (Russian: Киренга) is a river in Irkutsk Oblast in Russia. The name originated in an Evenki word. The length of the river is 746 kilometres (464 mi). The area of its basin is 46,600 square kilometres (18,000 mi^{2}).

There are many settlements in the river valley. The Baikal Amur Mainline follows and crosses the Kirenga between Magistralny and Ulkan.

== Course ==
It is a right tributary of the Lena which flows north between the upper Lena and Lake Baikal. The Kirenga begins in the Baikal Mountains 6 kilometres (4 mi) west of Lake Baikal, a few dozen kilometres north of the source of the Lena. The Kirenga marks the eastern limit of the Lena-Angara Plateau. The river flows along the Cis-Baikal Depression, limited by the Akitkan Range to the east. Finally it joins the Lena at the town of Kirensk.

The Kirenga is fed mainly by rain. It freezes up in late October to early November and stays under the ice until late April to May.

=== Tributaries ===
Its main tributaries are the Ulkan, Minya, Okunayka and Kutima from the right, as well as the Khanda from the left.

== See also ==
- List of rivers of Russia
