= Chuya (Lena) =

Chuya Чуя
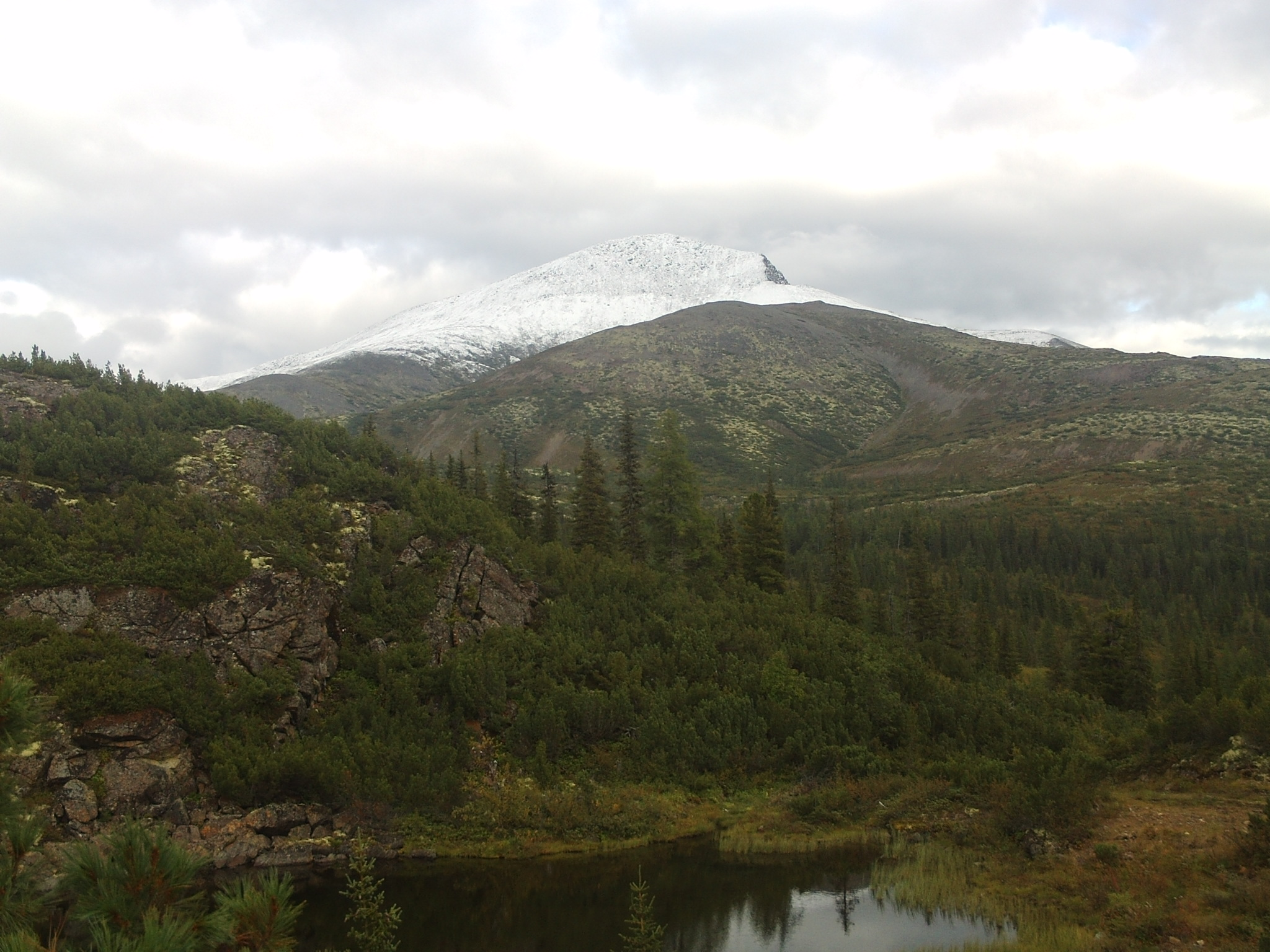
- View of the Synnyr, where the sources of the Chuya are located

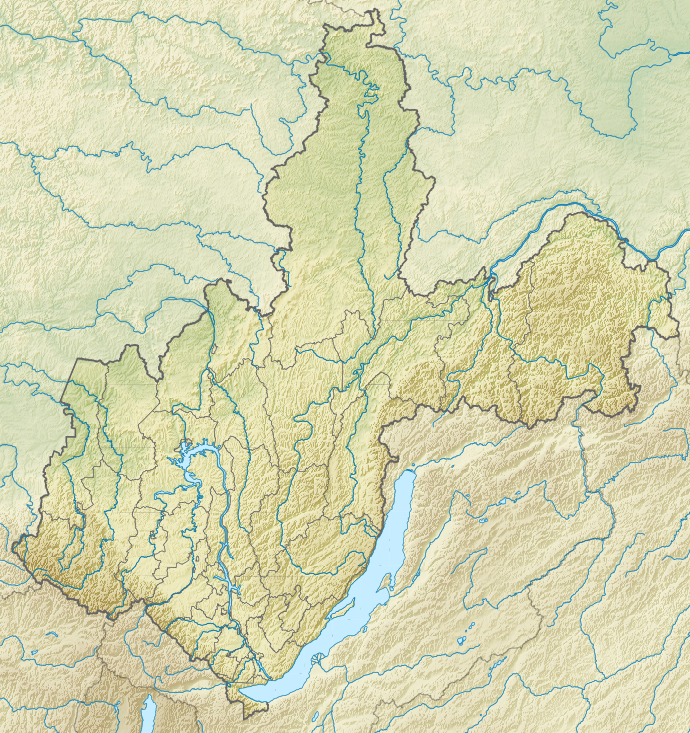
- Mouth location in Irkutsk Oblast, Russia

Location
- Country: Russia

Physical characteristics
- Source
  - location: Synnyr Massif, Buryatia
  - coordinates: 56°33′51″N 110°33′10″E
  - elevation: 1,775 m (5,823 ft)
- Mouth: Lena
  - location: Chuya (Irkutsk Oblast)
  - coordinates: 59°16′37″N 112°27′16″E
  - elevation: 228 m (748 ft)
- Length: 512 km (318 mi)
- Basin size: 18,400 km^{2} (7,100 sq mi)
- Discharge
  - average: 206 m^{3}/s (7,300 cu ft/s)

Basin features
- Progression: Lena→ Laptev Sea

The Chuya (Russian: Чуя), also known as Big Chuya (Russian: Большая Чуя, romanized: Bolshaya Chuya) in its last 52 km (32 mi) stretch, is a river in Buryatia and Irkutsk Oblast, Russia. It is the 13th longest tributary of the Lena and the 191st longest river in Russia, with a length of 512 kilometres (318 mi) and a drainage basin area of 18,400 square kilometres (7,100 mi^{2}).

The Mamsko-Chuysky District of Irkutsk Oblast is named after rivers Mama and Chuya. The abolished district's settlement of Chuya is located on the right bank of the Lena River at the confluence with the Chuya.

== History ==
In the 20th century there were mica mining operations in the upper basin of the Chuya. Gorno-Chuysky was a settlement of workers on the right bank of the river. It had had over 4,000 inhabitants in 1970, but lost population following the collapse of the USSR and only a residual population remained. Finally it was abolished in 2019.

Currently tourists visit the Chuya mainly for angling and watersports. The main fish species in the river are dace, lenok, whitefish, grayling and taimen.

== Course ==
The Chuya is a right tributary of the Lena, its 13th longest tributary. It has its sources in a small mountain lake of the Synnyr Massif of the North Baikal Highlands and flows in a roughly NNE direction across the highland area within the North Baikal District of Buryatia. Its channel is very stony and often divides into branches, with willows growing in the banks and in the islands. As it flows roughly northwards past the confluence of its Tukulakh tributary there is a long, tumultuous stretch with rapids and cascades. Downstream from the Gorno-Chuysky ghost town zone the river proceeds along a narrow valley with riffles in the current. Further north there is another area of strong rapids.

After it leaves the mountain area the Chuya river slows down, the river channel widens and it is joined by the Malaya Chuya on its left bank. In its last 52 km (32 mi) stretch the Chuya flows northwards across a floodplain as the Bolshaya Chuya. Finally the Chuya meets the right bank of the Lena by Chuya village, at the border of the Sakha Republic (Yakutia), 2,740 kilometres (1,700 mi) from its mouth. The town of Vitim lies just a few miles downstream from the confluence.

The largest tributary of the Chuya is the 257 kilometres (160 mi) long Malaya Chuya (Small Chuya) that joins it from the left and has a drainage basin area of 6,000 square kilometres (2,300 mi^{2}). The river freezes between October and May. Permafrost is distributed in the river basin in an uneven, discontinuous pattern.

Basin of the Lena

== See also ==
- List of rivers of Russia
