= Mamsko-Chuysky District =

Mamsko-Chuysky District Мамско-Чуйский район (Russian)
- District
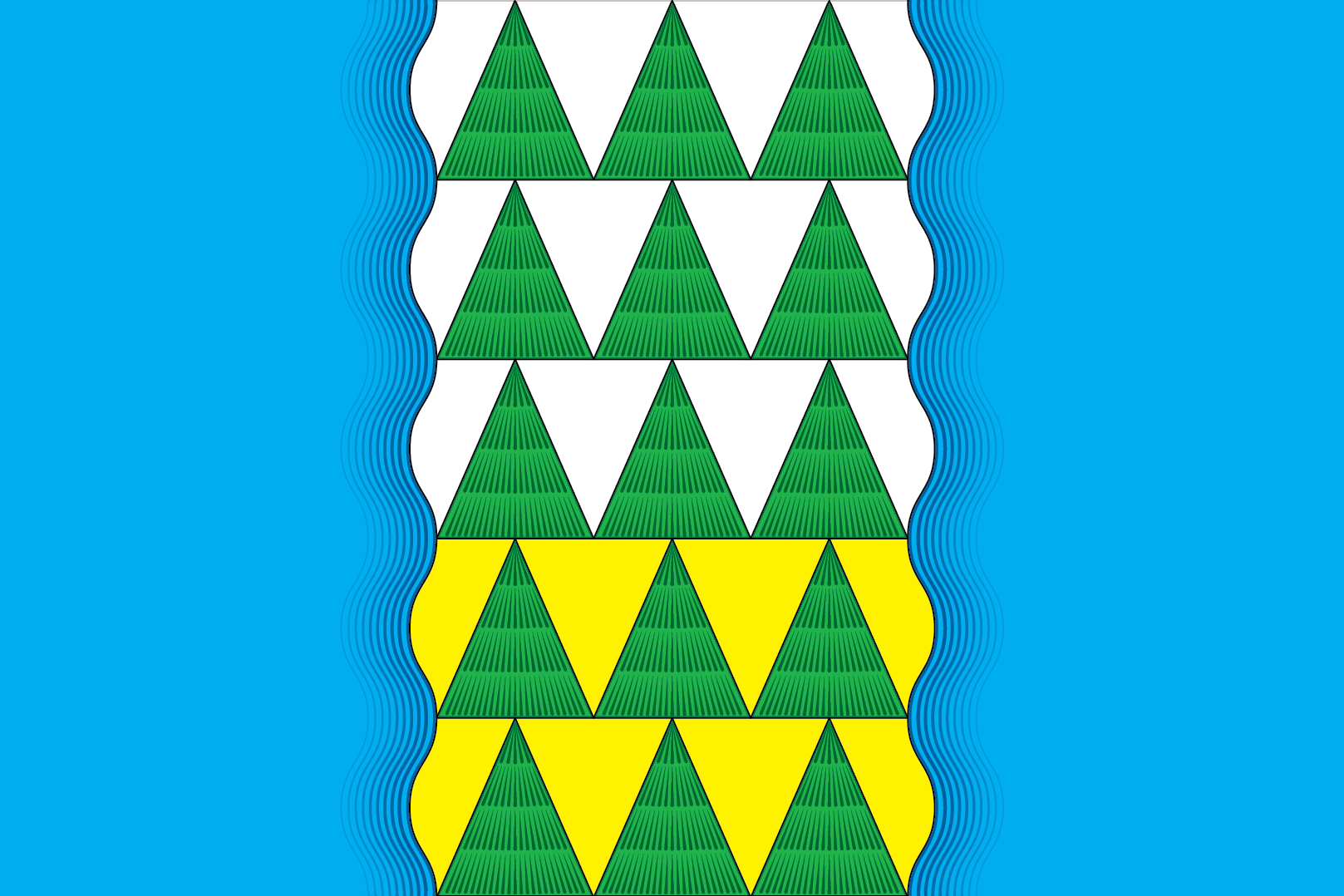
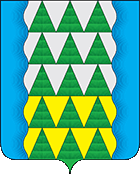
- Flag Coat of arms
- Location of Mamsko-Chuysky District (#17) in northeast of Irkutsk Oblast
- Coordinates: 58°18′29″N 112°54′11″E
- Country: Russia
- Federal subject: Irkutsk Oblast
- Established: 1951
- Administrative center: Mama

Area
  - Total: 43,396 km^{2} (16,755 sq mi)

Population (2010 Census)
  - Total: 5,501
  - Density: 0.1268/km^{2} (0.3283/sq mi)
  - Urban: 93.5%
  - Rural: 6.5%

Administrative structure
  - Inhabited localities: 5 urban-type settlements, 11 rural localities

Municipal structure
  - Municipally incorporated as: Mamsko-Chuysky Municipal District
  - Municipal divisions: 5 urban settlements, 0 rural settlements
- Time zone: UTC+8 (MSK+5)
- OKTMO ID: 25624000
- Website: http://mchr.irkobl.ru/

Mamsko-Chuysky District (Russian: Ма́мско-Чу́йский райо́н) is an administrative district, one of the thirty-three in Irkutsk Oblast, Russia. Municipally, it is incorporated as Mamsko-Chuysky Municipal District. The area of the district is 43,396 square kilometers (16,755 sq mi). Its administrative center is the urban locality (a work settlement) of Mama. Population: 5,501 (2010 census); 7,990 (2002 Census); 18,895 (1989 Soviet census). The population of Mama accounts for 66.0% of the district's total population.

== Geography ==
The district borders the Sakha Republic and the Lena River in the north. It includes parts of the basins of the Vitim, Mama and Chuya rivers, as well as several of their tributaries.
