= Mama (river) =

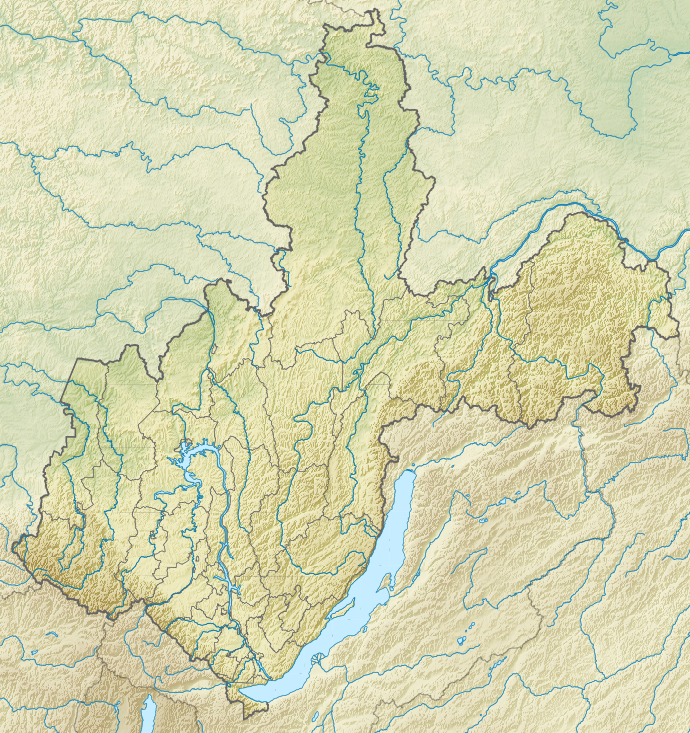
- Mouth location in Irkutsk Oblast, Russia

Location
- Country: Russia

Physical characteristics
- Source: Confluence of Left Mama and Right Mama
  - coordinates: 57°11′05″N 111°23′29″E
  - elevation: 439 m (1,440 ft)
- Mouth: Vitim
  - coordinates: 58°18′27″N 112°55′19″E
  - elevation: 209 m (686 ft)
- Length: 211 km (131 mi)
- Basin size: 18,900 km^{2} (7,300 sq mi)
- Discharge
  - average: 350 m^{3}/s (12,000 cu ft/s)

Basin features
- Progression: Vitim→ Lena→ Laptev Sea

The Mama (Russian: Мама) is a river in Irkutsk Oblast and Buryatia, Russia. It is a left tributary of the Vitim, the second largest in basin area after the Tsipa. The river has a length of 211 kilometres (131 mi) and a drainage basin of 18,900 square kilometres (7,300 sq mi). The total length of the river including the Left Mama is 406 kilometres (252 mi).

The Mamsko-Chuysky District of Irkutsk Oblast is named after rivers Mama and Chuya. The settlements of Bramya, Slyudyanka, Lugovsky, Zarya and Mama are located by the river.

== Course ==
The river basin is located on the slopes and foothills of the Upper Angara Range. Rivers Left Mama (Levaya Mama) and Right Mama (Pravaya Mama), which form the Mama river, have their sources in the heights of the range, at 1,720 m (5,640 ft) the first and at about 1,900 m (6,200 ft) the second. They are fast-flowing mountain rivers, with rapids and waterfalls. After the confluence the Mama flows roughly northeastwards across a fragmented floodplain slightly meandering among rocky banks. The river is navigable downstream from the confluence of the Bramya, a small tributary. Finally the Mama meets the lower course of the Vitim 171 km (106 mi) from its mouth in the Lena.

The river is located in an area marked by permafrost. Most of the territory adjacent to the river is covered by larch taiga and Siberian pine in the upper reaches, crowned by golets bare summits. The main tributaries of the Mama are the 153 kilometres (95 mi) long Konkudera, the 48 kilometres (30 mi) long Kaverga and the 40 kilometres (25 mi) long Bolshoi Ugli.

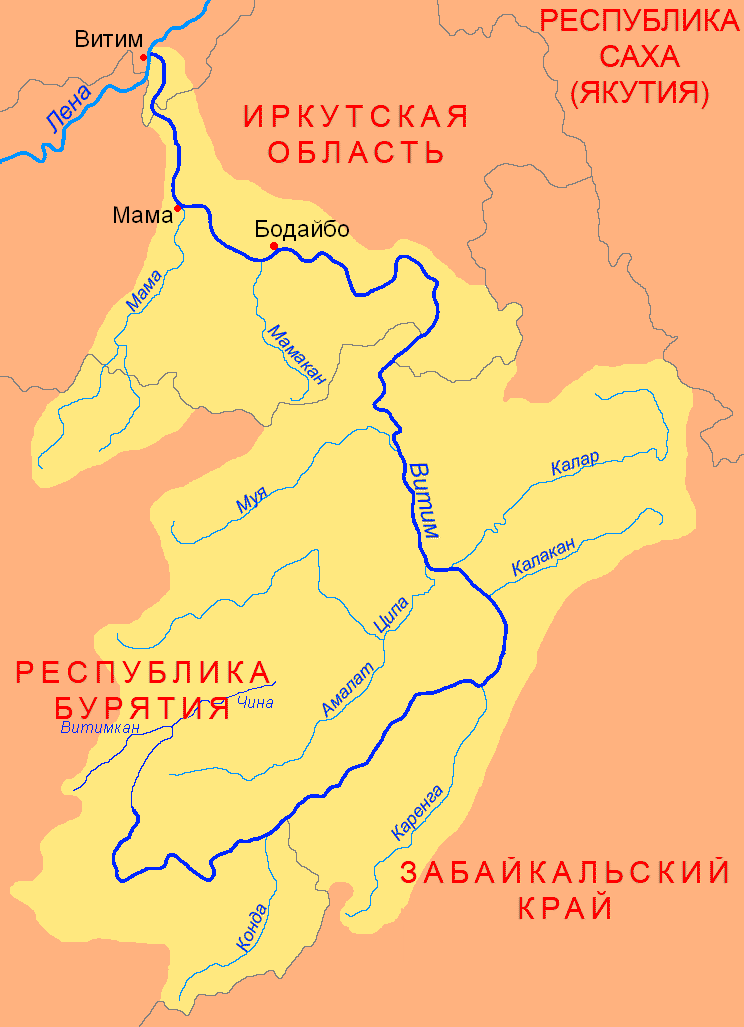
Basin of the Vitim with the Mama in the upper part.
