= Mama, Russia =

Mama Мама
- Urban-type settlement
- Interactive map of Mama
- Location of Mama Mama (Irkutsk Oblast)
- Coordinates: 58°19′N 112°54′E
- Country: Russia
- Federal subject: Irkutsk Oblast
- Administrative district: Mamsko-Chuysky District
- Founded: 1928
- Elevation: 224 m (735 ft)

Population (2010 Census)
  - Total: 3,630
  - Estimate (2025): 2,401 (−33.9%)
- Time zone: UTC+8 (MSK+5)
- Postal code: 666811
- OKTMO ID: 25624151051

Mama (Russian: Мама) is an urban locality (a work settlement) and the administrative center of Mamsko-Chuysky District of Irkutsk Oblast, Russia. Population: 3,630 (2010 census); 4,352 (2002 census); 6,918 (1989 Soviet census).

The Mama Airport is located 1 kilometer (0.62 mi) from the settlement.

== Geography ==
Mama is located in the area of the Patom Highlands, at the confluence of the Mama and Vitim Rivers.
