= Kirensk =

Town in Irkutsk Oblast, Russia

Kirensk Киренск
- Town
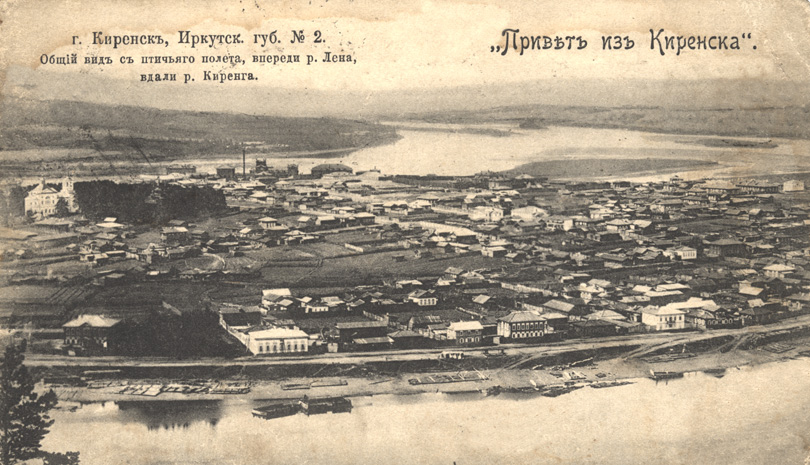

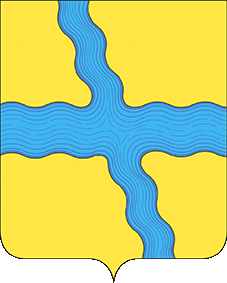
- Flag Coat of arms
- Interactive map of Kirensk
- Location of Kirensk Kirensk (Irkutsk Oblast)
- Coordinates: 57°47′N 108°05′E
- Country: Russia
- Federal subject: Irkutsk Oblast
- Administrative district: Kirensky District
- Founded: 1630
- Town status since: 1775
- Elevation: 260 m (850 ft)

Population (2010 Census)
  - Total: 12,640
  - Estimate (2021): 10,998 (−13%)

Administrative status
  - Capital of: Kirensky District

Municipal status
  - Municipal district: Kirensky Municipal District
  - Urban settlement: Kirenskoye Urban Settlement
  - Capital of: Kirensky Municipal District, Kirenskoye Urban Settlement
- Time zone: UTC+8 (MSK+5)
- Postal codes: 666700–666703, 666705
- Dialing code: +7 39568
- OKTMO ID: 25620101001
- Website: gorod-kirensk.ru

Kirensk (Russian: Киренск, IPA: [ˈkʲirʲɪnsk]) is a town and the administrative center of Kirensky District in Irkutsk Oblast, Russia, located at the confluence of the Kirenga and Lena Rivers, 950 kilometers (590 mi) north of Irkutsk, the administrative center of the oblast. Population: 12,640 (2010 census); 13,712 (2002 census); 16,137 (1989 Soviet census).

== Geography ==
The town is located in the Lena-Angara Plateau.

== History ==
It was founded in 1630 by the Cossacks under Vasily Bugor as a winter settlement called Nikolsky pogost. Along with Ust-Kut, it was one of the two main portages between the Yenisei and Lena basins. In the 1630s, Yerofey Khabarov ran a salt works here. In 1665, it was renamed Kirensky Ostrog. In 1775, it was granted town status. In the 19th century, a large number of political prisoners were forcibly resettled here, among whom was Józef Piłsudski.

Under Stalin there was a Gulag transit camp in the town. In 1991, over eighty bodies were found buried in the basement of the former NKVD building. All were said to have been killed on a single day in 1938 and all were killed by blows on the head, apparently to hide the noise. That same year they were reburied in the town (Khabarovskoe) cemetery.

During the construction of the Baikal–Amur Mainline, goods were shipped up the Kirenga to Magistralny. In the 1970s, a dam was built across one mouth of the Kirenga (the place was originally an island) to reduce flooding and ice jams. In 2001, there was a major flood.

== Administrative and municipal status ==
Within the framework of administrative divisions, Kirensk serves as the administrative center of Kirensky District, to which it is directly subordinated. As a municipal division, the town of Kirensk, together with nine rural localities in Kirensky District, is incorporated within Kirensky Municipal District as Kirenskoye Urban Settlement.

== Economy ==
=== Transportation ===
There is ship transport along the Lena in summer and an airport, but no railroad, and no proper road link to the rest of Russia. The port is used to transfer goods to smaller ships going further up the Lena.

The town is served by the Kirensk Airport. During World War II, it was a staging point for American aircraft transferred to Russia via Alaska.

== Climate ==
Kirensk has a subarctic climate (Köppen climate classification Dfc). Winters are severely cold with average temperatures from −31.3 °C (−24.3 °F) to −20.3 °C (−4.5 °F) in January, while summers are warm with average temperatures from +12.4 °C (54.3 °F) to +25.8 °C (78.4 °F). Precipitation is quite low and is significantly higher in summer than at other times of the year.

Climate data for Kirensk (1991-2020, extremes 1892–present)
Month	Jan	Feb	Mar	Apr	May	Jun	Jul	Aug	Sep	Oct	Nov	Dec	Year
Record high °C (°F)	1.4 (34.5)	7.0 (44.6)	16.1 (61.0)	24.5 (76.1)	33.6 (92.5)	36.8 (98.2)	36.6 (97.9)	36.5 (97.7)	29.3 (84.7)	24.0 (75.2)	10.6 (51.1)	4.1 (39.4)	36.8 (98.2)
Mean daily maximum °C (°F)	−20.3 (−4.5)	−13.7 (7.3)	−2.7 (27.1)	6.5 (43.7)	15.6 (60.1)	23.7 (74.7)	25.8 (78.4)	22.6 (72.7)	13.1 (55.6)	2.9 (37.2)	−10.6 (12.9)	−20.0 (−4.0)	3.6 (38.4)
Daily mean °C (°F)	−25.8 (−14.4)	−21.1 (−6.0)	−11.4 (11.5)	−0.5 (31.1)	8.1 (46.6)	16.0 (60.8)	18.7 (65.7)	15.4 (59.7)	7.0 (44.6)	−1.9 (28.6)	−15.6 (3.9)	−25.0 (−13.0)	−3.0 (26.6)
Mean daily minimum °C (°F)	−31.3 (−24.3)	−27.8 (−18.0)	−19.5 (−3.1)	−7.0 (19.4)	1.2 (34.2)	9.0 (48.2)	12.4 (54.3)	9.6 (49.3)	2.4 (36.3)	−5.8 (21.6)	−20.5 (−4.9)	−30.1 (−22.2)	−8.9 (15.9)
Record low °C (°F)	−57.8 (−72.0)	−56.2 (−69.2)	−47.7 (−53.9)	−36.8 (−34.2)	−15.4 (4.3)	−4.3 (24.3)	0.1 (32.2)	−5.3 (22.5)	−11.3 (11.7)	−37.6 (−35.7)	−49.6 (−57.3)	−57 (−71)	−57.8 (−72.0)
Average precipitation mm (inches)	20 (0.8)	15 (0.6)	11 (0.4)	14 (0.6)	34 (1.3)	53 (2.1)	62 (2.4)	55 (2.2)	41 (1.6)	30 (1.2)	27 (1.1)	26 (1.0)	388 (15.3)
Average extreme snow depth cm (inches)	37 (15)	42 (17)	42 (17)	18 (7.1)	0 (0)	0 (0)	0 (0)	0 (0)	0 (0)	2 (0.8)	14 (5.5)	28 (11)	42 (17)
Average rainy days	0	0.3	1	8	16	18	17	16	18	10	1	0	105
Average snowy days	26	24	19	15	6	0.3	0	0.1	3	20	26	27	166
Average relative humidity (%)	78	77	70	62	59	67	74	78	79	77	79	79	73
Mean monthly sunshine hours	62.0	108.4	187.3	229.1	256.9	283.9	284.9	229.9	136.9	84.5	69.3	41.7	1,974.8
Source 1: pogoda.ru.net
Source 2: NOAA

== Notable people ==
- Daniel Broido (1903-1990), computer engineer
